= Osage Township, Missouri =

Osage Township, Missouri may refer to one of the following 11 places in the State of Missouri:

- Osage Township, Bates County, Missouri
- Osage Township, Camden County, Missouri
- Osage Township, Cole County, Missouri
- Osage Township, Crawford County, Missouri
- Osage Township, Dent County, Missouri
- Osage Township, Henry County, Missouri
- Osage Township, Laclede County, Missouri
- Osage Township, Miller County, Missouri
- Osage Township, Morgan County, Missouri
- Osage Township, St. Clair County, Missouri
- Osage Township, Vernon County, Missouri

== See also ==
- Osage Township (disambiguation)
