= Osage Township =

Osage Township may refer to the following places in the United States:

== Arkansas ==
- Osage Township, Carroll County, Arkansas

== Illinois ==
- Osage Township, LaSalle County, Illinois

== Iowa ==
- Osage Township, Mitchell County, Iowa

== Kansas ==
- Osage Township, Allen County, Kansas
- Osage Township, Bourbon County, Kansas
- Osage Township, Crawford County, Kansas

== Minnesota ==
- Osage Township, Becker County, Minnesota

== Missouri ==
- Osage Township, Bates County, Missouri
- Osage Township, Camden County, Missouri
- Osage Township, Cole County, Missouri
- Osage Township, Crawford County, Missouri
- Osage Township, Dent County, Missouri
- Osage Township, Henry County, Missouri
- Osage Township, Laclede County, Missouri
- Osage Township, Miller County, Missouri
- Osage Township, Morgan County, Missouri
- Osage Township, St. Clair County, Missouri
- Osage Township, Vernon County, Missouri
