= Fields Creek (Missouri) =

Stream in the American state of Missouri

Fields Creek is a stream in Henry County in the U.S. state of Missouri. It is a tributary of the South Grand River.

The stream headwaters arise just west of Missouri Route 13 between Quarles and Shawnee Mound. The stream flows southwest and passes under Missouri Route 7 and Missouri Route 18 northwest of Clinton. The stream confluence with the South Grand is about three miles west of Clinton.

The headwaters are at 38°30′17″N 93°45′46″W and the confluence is at 38°20′59″N 93°49′37″W.

Fields Creek has the name of Joseph Fields, an early county sheriff.

== See also ==
- List of rivers of Missouri
