= Cottonwood Branch =

Stream in the American state of Missouri

Cottonwood Branch or Cottonwood Creek is a stream in Henry County in the U.S. state of Missouri. It is a tributary of Honey Creek.

The stream headwaters arise at 38°30′24″N 93°46′06″W just west of Missouri Route 13 north of Quarles and it flows west-southwest crossing under Missouri Route N north of Huntingdale to its confluence with Honey Creek in an old mined area at 38°28′06″N 93°51′43″W at an elevation of 732 ft (223 m).

Cottonwood Branch was so named due to the presence of cottonwood timber along its banks.

== See also ==
- List of rivers of Missouri
