= Pretty Bob Creek =

Stream in the American state of Missouri

Pretty Bob Creek is a stream in eastern Henry County in the U.S. state of Missouri. It is a tributary to the South Grand River within Truman Reservoir.

The stream headwaters arise at 38°20′20″N 93°38′21″W west of the community of Coal on Missouri Route 7 and the stream flows generally south passing east of the community of Gaines to enter the Truman Reservoir west of the Missouri Route U crossing at 38°15′38″N 93°38′08″W.

Pretty Bob Creek has the name of Bob "Pretty Bob" Lawler.

== See also ==
- List of rivers of Missouri
