= Bethlehem Township, Henry County, Missouri =

Township in Henry County, Missouri, U.S.

Coordinates: 38.3219°N 93.6828°W

Bethlehem Township is a township in Henry County, in the U.S. state of Missouri.

Bethlehem Township was established in 1873, taking its name from a Baptist church of the same name within its borders.

The township is located on Harry S. Truman Reservoir. Various creeks, such as Dillion Creek, Pretty Bob Creek, Dumpling Creek, also flow through the township.
