= Harding Creek =

Harding Creek may refer to:

- Harding Creek (Missouri)
- Harding Creek (South Dakota)
