= Coal, Missouri =

Unincorporated community in the US state of Missouri

Coordinates: 38°19′33″N 93°36′55″W

Coal is an unincorporated community in Henry County, in the U.S. state of Missouri. The community is located on Missouri Route 7 approximately 10 miles east of Clinton. The Harry S Truman Reservoir on the South Grand River is about four miles to the south.

== History ==
Coal was originally called Coale's Store, and under the latter name was laid out in 1859, and named after Stephen Coale, an early settler. Other variant names were "Coale", "Coalesburg", "Colesburg", and "Galbreath".
