= Urich =

Urich may refer to

- Urich, Missouri, a town in the United States
- Urich (surname)
- Urich's tyrannulet, a bird endemic to Venezuela
