= Fields Creek =

Fields Creek may refer to:

- Fields Creek (Missouri), a stream in Missouri
- Fields Creek (Kanawha River tributary), a stream in West Virginia
