= Maurine =

Maurine may refer to:

Places:

- Maurine (stream), Mecklenburg-Vorpommern, Germany
- Maurine, Missouri, a community in the United States
- Maurine, South Dakota, a community in the United States

People:

- Maurine (footballer) (born 1986), a Brazilian footballer
- Maurine Karagianis (born 1950), Canadian politician
- Maurine Brown Neuberger (1907–2000), US senator from Oregon
- Maurine Dallas Watkins (1896–1969), American journalist and playwright
- Maurine Whipple (1903–1992), American writer

== See also ==
- Maurines, a commune in the Cantal department of France
- Maureen
