= Maureen =

Maureen /mɔːˈriːn/ is a female name. In Gaelic, it is Máirín, a pet form of Máire (the Irish cognate of Mary), which is derived from the Hebrew Miriam.

Some notable bearers of the name are:

== People ==
- Maureen Anderman (born 1946), American actress
- Maureen Arthur (1934–2022), American actress
- Maureen Murphy Baronian (1934–2001), American politician
- Maureen Beattie (born 1953), Scottish actress
- Dame Maureen Brennan (born 1954), British educator
- Maureen Chadwick, British screenwriter, dramatist and television producer
- Maureen Charuni (born 1963), Sri Lankan actress
- Maureen Child (born 1951), American writer
- Maureen Colquhoun (1928–2021), British politician
- Maureen Connolly (1934–1969), American tennis player
- Maureen Connor (born 1947), American artist
- Maureen Corrigan (born 1955), American author, scholar, and literary critic
- Maureen Cummins (born 1963), American artist
- Maureen Daly (1921–2006), Irish American author and journalist
- Maureen Dowd (born 1952), American journalist
- Maureen Drake (born 1971), Canadian tennis player
- Maureen Duffy (1933–2026), British poet, writer, and activist
- Maureen Fitzgerald Terry, American politician
- Maureen Forrester (1930–2010), Canadian opera singer
- Maureen Googoo, Mi'kmaq journalist
- Maureen Guy (1932–2015), Welsh mezzo-soprano singer
- Maureen Hanson, American molecular biologist and professor
- Maureen Hemphill (born 1937), Canadian politician
- Maureen Herman (born 1966), American rock musician
- Maureen Hingert (1937–2025), Sri Lankan dancer, model, and actress
- Maureen Howard (1930–2022), American writer and editor
- Maureen Hunter (born 1948), Canadian playwright
- Maureen Irwin (1934–2002), Canadian activist
- Maureen Johnson (born 1973), American writer
- Maureen Kearney (born 1956), Irish syndicalist and whistleblower
- Maureen Larrazabal (born 1979), Filipina actress, singer and commercial model
- Maureen Lehane (1932–2010), English mezzo-soprano singer
- Dame Maureen Lipman (born 1946), British actress
- Maureen Louys (born 1978), Belgian television presenter
- Maureen Magarity (born 1981), American basketball coach
- Maureen Maher (born 1967), American television reporter
- Maureen Mann (1944–2023), American politician
- Maureen McCormick (born 1956), American actress
- Maureen McGovern (born 1949), American singer
- Maureen McQuillan, American contemporary artist
- Maureen Medved, Canadian playwright
- Maureen Molloy (1925–2011), Australian pioneer of clinical neuropsychology, cognitive rehabilitation therapy and forensic neuropsychology
- Maureen Molloy (anthropologist), Canadian–New Zealand anthropologist
- Maureen Morris, New Zealand nurse
- Maureen Murphy (born 1999), American ice hockey player
- Maureen O'Boyle (born 1963), American television reporter and news anchor
- Maureen O'Brien (born 1943), English actress
- Maureen O'Hara (1920–2015), Irish actress
- Maureen Orth (born 1943), American journalist
- Maureen O'Sullivan (1911–1998), American actress
- Maureen Paley (born 1953), American owner of an art gallery
- Maureen Phillips, Trinidadian cricketer
- Maureen Pugh (born 1958), New Zealand politician
- Maureen Raymo (born 1959), American paleoclimatologist and marine geologist
- Maureen Reagan (1941–2001), American political activist and child of Ronald Reagan
- Maureen Riscoe (1921–2003), British actress and casting director
- Maureen Stapleton (1925–2006), American actress
- Maureen Starkey Tigrett (1946–1994), first wife of musician Ringo Starr
- Maureen Swanson (1932–2011), British actress
- Maureen Thompson, Saint Helenian politician
- Maureen Tucker (born 1944), American drummer
- Maureen Watson (1931–2009), Aboriginal Australian rights activist
- Maureen Thelma Watson (1925–1994), Rhodesian politician
- Maureen Wroblewitz (born 1998), Filipino-German fashion model
- Maureen White, Canadian theatre actor, director, and playwright

== Maurene ==
- Maurene Comey (born 1988), American lawyer
- Maurene Goo, American author
- Maurene Horder (born 1950), Australian politician

== Fictional characters ==
- Maureen Bullock, a character in the British sitcom Please Sir!
- Maureen Clinton, aka Mo, a character in the British children's series Sooty & Co.
- Maureen Connor, aka Permafrost, a character from Static Shock
- Maureen Corley, a character in Full Throttle
- Maureen Holdsworth, a character in Coronation Street
- Maureen Johnson, a character in the musical and film Rent
- Maureen Johnson, a character in novels by Robert Heinlein
- Maureen Murphy, a character in the Netflix series F is for Family
- Maureen Prescott, Sidney Prescott’s mother in the Scream saga
- Maureen Robinson, mother of the Robinson family in Lost in Space

== See also ==
- Maureen (disambiguation)
- Maurine (disambiguation)
