= Missouri Route 7 =

State highway in Missouri, U.S.

Route 7

Route information
- Maintained by MoDOT
- Length: 186.476 mi (300.104 km)
- Existed: 1959–present

Major junctions
- South end: I-44 / Route P north of Laquey
- Route 5 from southeast of Camdenton to Greenview; US 54 in Camdenton; US 65 from Dell Junction to Warsaw; Route 13 / Route 18 / Route 52 in Clinton; I-49 / US 71 / Route 2 in Harrisonville; US 50 near Lee's Summit; I-70 / US 40 in Blue Springs
- North end: US 24 in northeast Independence

Location
- Country: United States
- State: Missouri
- Counties: Pulaski, Camden, Benton, Henry Cass Jackson

Highway system
- Missouri State Highway System; Interstate; US; State; Supplemental
← Route 6	→ Route 8

Route 7 is a north/south state highway with its northern terminus at U.S. Route 24 in northeast Independence and its southern terminus at Interstate 44 southeast of Richland (near the town of Laquey which it doesn't quite reach). The section between Harrisonville (at a junction with Interstate 49/U.S. Route 71) and Clinton (at a junction with Route 13) provides an important link for traffic between Springfield and Kansas City.

== Route description ==
The route begins at Interstate 44, exit 150, as a two-lane highway. It then heads northwest into Richland, intersecting with Route 133. From there, it continues northwest to a concurrency with Route 5, starting three miles south of Camdenton. In Camdenton, it crosses U.S. 54, and continues northwest, crossing the Lake of the Ozarks. After crossing the lake, Route 5 enters Greenville, and the highway diverges north, and Route 7 heads west, pass through Climax Springs and Edwards then continues west to another concurrency with US 65. The combined route crosses Harry S. Truman Reservoir and the Osage River and then enters Warsaw, where the concurrency ends; Route 7 heads west and crosses more arms of the Truman Reservoir. At Clinton, it intersects Route 13 and Route 52, and then becomes a four-lane highway, running northwest to Interstate 49/US 71 in Harrisonville. The four-lane expressway portion is part of the Springfield-Kansas City expressway. After a brief concurrency with I-49/U.S. 71, Route 7 heads north as a two-lane highway, crossing Route 58 in Pleasant Hill, Route 150, and US 50. In Blue Springs, it crosses US 40 and I-70. Continuing north, Route 7 is the eastern terminus of Route 78, before itself terminating at US 24 in Independence.

== History ==
Missouri Route 7 links the Kansas City area to the Ozarks, however it was not always called Route 7. Starting in 1926-27 it connected US 71 to US 50 only, by 1937 it had been extended to US 40. The section that runs east from US 71 - US 65 (1935), to US 54, and later on to US 66 (1953) was once called State Route 35. This was changed to Route 7 in 1959. In the early 1970s with the creation of Truman Lake, the Osage River Bridge was bypassed with a new mile long span.

== Business route ==
Route 7 Business
- Location: Pleasant Hill
- Length: 0.83 mi (1,340 m)

A one-mile business route of MO 7 exists in Pleasant Hill, which can take you to two churches, and the school district office.

== Major intersections ==
County	Location	mi	km	Destinations	Notes
Pulaski	Liberty Township	0.000	0.000	I-44 / Route P east – Springfield, Rolla	I-44 exit 150
Pulaski	Richland	7.829	12.600	Route 133 north – Swedeborg	Southern terminus of Route 133 overlap
Pulaski	Richland	8.967	14.431	Route 133 south to I-44 – Hazelgreen, Business District	Northern terminus of Route 133 overlap
Camden	Osage Township	31.390	50.517	Route 5 south / Route 5 Bus. north – Camdenton, Lebanon	Interchange; southern terminus of Route 5 overlap
Camden	Camdenton	33.673	54.191	US 54 – Camdenton, Nevada, Osage Beach	Interchange
Camden	Camdenton	36.139	58.160	Route 5 Bus. south / Pier 31 Road – Camdenton	Interchange
Camden	Greenview	41.573	66.905	Route 5 north – Hurricane Deck, Sunrise Beach	Northern terminus of Route 5 overlap
Benton	Dell Junction	72.700	116.999	US 65 south – Fristoe, Springfield	Southern terminus of US 65 overlap
Benton	Tom Township	77.575	124.845	Route 83 south – White Branch	Interchange
Benton	Warsaw	78.344	126.082	Warsaw	Interchange; no northbound entrance
Benton	Warsaw	79.195	127.452	US 65 north – Sedalia	Interchange; northern terminus of US 65 overlap
Henry	Clinton	107.485	172.980	Route 13 south / Route 18 west / Route 52 west – Clinton, Springfield	Eastern terminus of Route 18; southern terminus of Route 13/52 overlap
Henry	Clinton	108.927	175.301	Route 52 east – Windsor	Interchange; northern terminus of Route 52 overlap
Henry	Clinton	109.825	176.746	Route 13 north / Route 13 Bus. south – Clinton, Warrensburg	Northern terminus of Route 13 overlap
Henry	Bogard Township	124.325	200.082	Route K / Route B – Urich	Interchange
Cass	Creighton	128.733	207.176	Route B – Creighton	Interchange
Cass	Index–Camp Branch township line	137.498	221.282	Route F / Route Z / Route N – Garden City, Blairstown	Interchange
Cass	Harrisonville	146.750	236.171	I-49 south / US 71 south – Joplin, Nevada	Southern terminus of I-49/US 71 overlap; Route 7 south follows exit 157
Cass	Harrisonville	147.997	238.178	Route 2 east (Commercial Street)	Southern terminus of Route 2 overlap; I-49 exit 158
Cass	Harrisonville	148.979	239.758	I-49 north / US 71 north / Route 2 west – Kansas City, Freeman	Northern terminus of I-49/US 71/Route 2 overlap; Route 7 north follows exit 159
Cass	Pleasant Hill	160.992	259.092	Route 58	Interchange
Jackson		166.498	267.953	Route 150 west – Greenwood	Southern terminus of Route 150 overlap
Jackson		166.998	268.757	Route 150 east – Lone Jack	Northern terminus of Route 150 overlap
Jackson		169.004	271.986	US 50 – Kansas City, Warrensburg	Interchange
Jackson	Blue Springs	177.238	285.237	US 40 – Independence, Kansas City, Grain Valley	
Jackson	Blue Springs	178.690	287.574	I-70 – Kansas City, Columbia	I-70 exit 20
Jackson	Independence	184.002	296.123	Route 78 west / Lake City-Buckner Road – Independence, Lake City	Traffic circle; eastern terminus of Route 78
Jackson	Independence	186.476	300.104	US 24 / Lewis and Clark Trail – Independence, Buckner	Interchange
1.000 mi = 1.609 km; 1.000 km = 0.621 mi: Concurrency terminus
