= Deer Creek (South Grand River tributary) =

Stream in Henry County, Missouri, United States

Coordinates: 38.3333558°N 93.7507679°W

Deer Creek is a stream in Henry County in the U.S. state of Missouri. It is a tributary of the South Grand River.

Deer Creek was named for the fact deer were hunted there.

== See also ==
- List of rivers of Missouri
