= Finey =

Finey may refer to:

- Finey, Missouri, a community in the United States
- Finey (Haa Dhaalu Atoll), an atoll in the Maldives
- George Finey (1895–1987), Australian illustrator, cartoonist and caricaturist

== See also ==
- Finney (disambiguation)
