= Sand Creek (Tebo Creek tributary) =

Stream in the US state of Missouri

Sand Creek is a stream in Henry County in the U.S. state of Missouri. It is a tributary of Tebo Creek.

The stream headwaters are just east of Missouri Route 13 about two miles south of Shawnee Mound (at 38°31′05″N 93°45′39″W) and the stream flows southeast to cross Missouri Route 52 just west of Calhoun. The stream is impounded as a small lake west of Calhoun. From there the stream flows south then east to its confluence with Tebo Creek (at 38°25′48″N 93°36′58″W).

The stream was originally named Little Tebo Creek, but was renamed Sand Creek to avoid confusion. The name was chosen due to the presence of a large sand dune or sand bar along its course.

== See also ==
- List of rivers of Missouri
