= Bear Creek Township, Henry County, Missouri =

Township in Henry County, Missouri, U.S.

Coordinates: 38.2539°N 93.9077°W

Bear Creek Township is a township in Henry County, in the U.S. state of Missouri.

Bear Creek Township was established in 1873, taking its name from Bear Creek.

Other creeks are Marshall Creek and Trap Branch.
