= Honey Creek Township, Henry County, Missouri =

Township in Henry County, Missouri, U.S.

Coordinates: 38.423325°N 93.899955°W

Honey Creek Township is a township in Henry County, in the U.S. state of Missouri.

Honey Creek Township was established in 1873, taking its name from Honey Creek.
