= Dumpling Creek =

Stream in Missouri, United States

Coordinates: 38°18′33″N 93°43′10″W

Dumpling Creek is a stream in Henry County in the U.S. state of Missouri. It is a tributary of the South Grand River within Harry S Truman Reservoir.

The origin of the name Dumpling Creek is obscure, though it has been suggested to be so named "because it runs so fast".

== See also ==
- List of rivers of Missouri
