= Deer Creek Township, Henry County, Missouri =

Township in Henry County, Missouri, U.S.

Coordinates: 38.4186793°N 93.6800706°W

Deer Creek Township is a township in Henry County, in the U.S. state of Missouri.

Deer Creek Township was established in 1873, taking its name from Deer Creek.
