= Dumpling (disambiguation) =

A dumpling is a cooked ball of dough.

Dumpling, dumplin', or dumplings may also refer to:

- Dumplin' (2015), a young adult novel
- Dumplin' (film), a 2018 film adaptation of the novel
- Dumplings (film), a 2004 Hong Kong film
- "Dumplings" (song), by Pink Guy
- The Dumplings (TV series), 1976
- The Dumplings (duo), Polish electronic music duo
- OnePlus 5T, a smartphone codenamed "dumpling"
- Dumpling Creek, a stream in Missouri, USA
- Fort Dumpling, American Revolutionary War site
- Sweet dumpling squash, a cultivar of cucurbita pepo
