= Tightwad =

A tightwad may refer to a miser but may also refer to:

- Jorah Tightwad, a character in Nexo Knights
- Tightwad Hill, California
- Tightwad, Missouri
