= Huntingdale =

Huntingdale may refer to:

== Places ==
- Huntingdale, Missouri, a community in the United States
- Huntingdale, Victoria, a suburb of Melbourne, Australia
  - Huntingdale railway station
- Huntingdale, Western Australia, a south eastern suburb of Perth, Australia
- Huntingdale, Westleigh, New South Wales, Australia

== Facilities and structures ==
- Huntingdale Primary School, Oakleigh South, Melbourne, Victoria, Australia
- Huntingdale Golf Club, Oakleigh South, Melbourne, Victoria, Australia; venue for the Australian Masters golf tournament

== Other uses ==
- Huntingdale (horse), a Thoroughbred racehorse

== See also ==
- Hunting (disambiguation)
- Dale (disambiguation)
