= Leesville Township, Henry County, Missouri =

Township in the US state of Missouri

Coordinates: 38.318934°N 93.575241°W

Leesville Township is a township in Henry County, in the U.S. state of Missouri.

Leesville Township was established in 1873, taking its name from the community of Leesville, Missouri.
