= Tightwad, Missouri =

- Village
- Location of Tightwad, Missouri
- Coordinates: 38°18′35″N 93°32′48″W
- Country: United States
- State: Missouri
- County: Henry

Government
  - Mayor: Bill Collins

Area
  - Total: 1.01 sq mi (2.61 km^{2})
  - Land: 1.00 sq mi (2.58 km^{2})
  - Water: 0.012 sq mi (0.03 km^{2})
- Elevation: 876 ft (267 m)

Population (2020)
  - Total: 58
  - Density: 58.1/sq mi (22.45/km^{2})
- Time zone: UTC-6 (Central (CST))
  - Summer (DST): UTC-5 (CDT)
- ZIP code: 64735
- Area code: 660
- FIPS code: 29-73240
- GNIS feature ID: 2399980

Tightwad is a village in Henry County, Missouri, United States. As of the 2020 census, Tightwad had a population of 58. Tightwad is located along Missouri Route 7.

== History and name ==
Tightwad was originally called Edgewood, for the woods near the original town site.

The village's unusual name is said to stem from an episode in which a store owner cheated a customer, who was a postman, by charging him an extra 50 cents for a better watermelon. Some sources claim the transaction involved a rooster rather than a watermelon. Due to its proximity to Truman Reservoir, Tightwad saw some limited growth starting in the mid-1980s. As of 2010, the village's business district included a bank (see below), café, tavern, and convenience store. As of April 2019, the bank is now closed and is being used for personal use.

== Geography ==
According to the United States Census Bureau, the village has a total area of 1.01 square miles (2.62 km^{2}), of which 1.00 square mile (2.59 km^{2}) is land and 0.01 square miles (0.03 km^{2}) is water.

== Demographics ==
Historical population
Census	Pop.	Note	%±
1990	50		—
2000	63		26.0%
2010	69		9.5%
2020	58		−15.9%
U.S. Decennial Census

The median income for a household in the village was $24,375, and the median income for a family was $51,250. Males had a median income of $35,417 versus $30,625 for females. The per capita income for the village was $18,981. There were no families and 16.7% of the population living below the poverty line, including no under eighteens and 21.4% of those over 64.

=== 2010 census ===
As of the census of 2010, there were 69 people, 31 households, and 18 families residing in the village. The population density was 69.0 inhabitants per square mile (26.6/km^{2}). There were 36 housing units at an average density of 36.0 per square mile (13.9/km^{2}). The racial makeup of the village was 98.6% White and 1.4% from two or more races, although it's unclear whether everyone was accounted for in this Census.

There were 31 households, of which 19.4% had children under the age of 18 living with them, 48.4% were married couples living together, 3.2% had a female householder with no husband present, 6.5% had a male householder with no wife present, and 41.9% were non-families. 32.3% of all households were made up of individuals, and 9.7% had someone living alone who was 65 years of age or older. The average household size was 2.23 and the average family size was 2.72.

The median age in the village was 53.5 years. 21.7% of residents were under the age of 18; 2.8% were between the ages of 18 and 24; 15.8% were from 25 to 44; 30.4% were from 45 to 64; and 29% were 65 years of age or older. The gender makeup of the village was 50.7% male and 49.3% female.

=== 2020 census ===
As of the census of 2020, there were 58 people, and 35 households, 13 of which were married couple households, 13 were cohabiting, 6 were male, no spouse/partner with 5 of those being 65 or older, 3 were female, no spouse/partner, of which 1 was over 65. 3 households had people 18 years, 22 had people 65 or older. 4 children enrolled in school, 3 in elementary schools, one in college or graduate school.

== Tightwad Bank ==
The first Tightwad Bank opened in 1984 as a branch of the Citizens Bank of Windsor (Windsor, Missouri) at first housed in a portable trailer then eventually a one-story brick building still in use today.(Now currently out of business) Publicity over the unusual name eventually led to deposits totalling over $2 million. However an expected business boom from nearby Truman Reservoir never materialized and the bank fell victim to armed robbery twice in the 1990s. Thus in November 2006, UMB, the bank's owner at the time, announced that the Tightwad branch bank would close, and accounts would be shuffled to UMB locations in Warsaw and Clinton, Missouri.
In May 2008, Tightwad Bank was reopened under new ownership, as an FDIC insured institution. The bank was a full-service branch of the former Reading State Bank, Reading, Kansas. To capitalize on the notoriety of the unusual name, the Reading location's name was changed to Tightwad Bank as well. "We're seeking the customers with a sense of humor", admitted bank co-owner Donald Higdon in a 2008 interview with The Washington Post. In 2010 the two locations of Tightwad Bank reported combined deposits of over $20 million (US). As of July 2018 Tightwad Bank in Tightwad Missouri is closed.
