= Mount Zion, Missouri =

Unincorporated community in Missouri, U.S.

Coordinates: 38.217525°N 93.637987°W

Mount Zion is an unincorporated community in Henry County, in the U.S. state of Missouri.

== History ==
A post office called Mount Zion was established in 1873, and remained in operation until 1910. The community took its name from a nearby Methodist Episcopal church of the same name.
