= Lucas, Missouri =

Unincorporated community in Missouri, U.S.

Coordinates: 38°24′59″N 94°01′44″W

Lucas is an unincorporated community in Henry County, in the U.S. state of Missouri.

== History ==
A post office called Lucas was established in 1852, and remained in operation until 1901. The community bears the name of a local merchant.
