= Finey, Missouri =

Unincorporated community in Missouri, U.S.

Coordinates: 38°14′02″N 93°32′45″W

Finey is an unincorporated community in southeastern Henry County, in the U.S. state of Missouri. The community is on Missouri Route Z just over one mile from the Henry-Benton county line. The Osage arm of the Truman Reservoir and the Henry-St Clair county line is approximately one mile to the south. The Grand River arm of the reservoir is about two miles to the north of the community.

== History ==
A post office called Finey was established in 1884, and remained in operation until 1911. An early settler named the community after his nephew, Finey West.
