= Tebo Township, Henry County, Missouri =

Township in Henry County, Missouri, U.S.

Coordinates: 38.50°N 93.64°W

Tebo Township is a township in Henry County, in the U.S. state of Missouri.

Tebo Township takes its name from Tebo Creek.
