= Ladies Branch =

Stream in the American state of Missouri

Coordinates: 38.034754°N 94.194391°W

Ladies Branch is a stream in Vernon County in the U.S. state of Missouri. It is a tributary of the Osage River.

Ladies Branch, historically called Lady Branch, has the name of Wilton Lady, a pioneer citizen.

== See also ==
- List of rivers of Missouri
