= Fairview Township, Henry County, Missouri =

Township in Henry County, Missouri, U.S.

Coordinates: 38.2473974°N 93.7991578°W

Fairview Township is a township in Henry County, in the U.S. state of Missouri.

Fairview Township was established in 1873, taking its name from a local schoolhouse of the same name.
