= Dell Junction, Missouri =

- Unincorporated community
- Location within Missouri Location within the United States
- Coordinates: 38°10′28″N 93°19′06″W
- Country: United States
- State: Missouri
- County: Benton
- Elevation: 896 ft (273 m)
- Time zone: UTC-6 (Central (CST))
  - Summer (DST): UTC-5 (CDT)
- Area code: 660
- GNIS feature ID: 716830

Dell Junction is an unincorporated community in Benton County, Missouri, United States. Dell Junction is located at the junction of U.S. Route 65 and Missouri Route 7, 5.9 miles (9.5 km) southeast of Warsaw.
