= State Line Road =

Road in Kansas City, Missouri–Kansas, United States

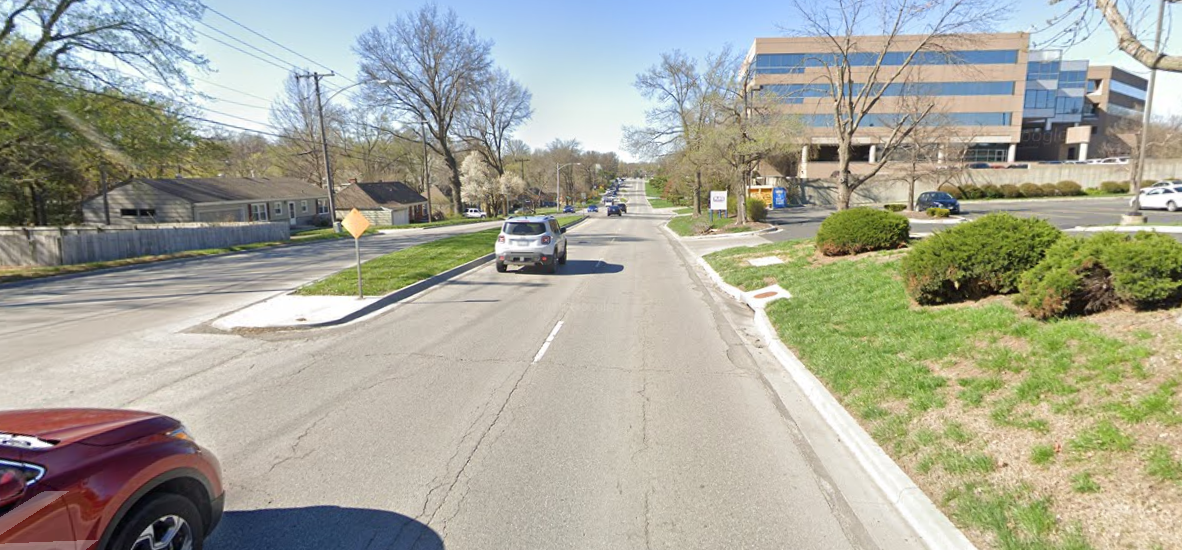
- Namesake: Boundary between the states of Kansas and Missouri
- Length: 12.5 mi (20.1 km)
- South end: Route 150 / 135th Street at the Leawood, KS–Kansas City, MO line
- Major junctions: I-435 at the Leawood, KS–Kansas City, MO line; US 54 at the Mission Woods, KS–Kansas City, MO line; Chester Avenue / Eaton Street in Kansas City, MO-KS; 25 Street in Kansas City, MO-KS; Genesee Street in Kansas City, MO-KS; American Royal Drive in Kansas City, MO; Butler Way in Kansas City, MO; St. Louis Avenue in Kansas City, MO-KS
- North end: Central Avenue in Kansas City, MO-KS

State Line Road is a major north–south street in the Kansas City metropolitan area that runs along the Kansas–Missouri state line. For much of its length, northbound traffic is in Missouri and southbound traffic is in Kansas.

The major portion of the road is 12.5 miles (20.1 km) south from Chester Avenue to 135th Street / Missouri Route 150. It continues as Eaton Street into Kansas City, Kansas at its northern terminus and as Kenneth Road into Leawood at its southern terminus. Its northernmost point is roughly 0.75 miles (1.21 km) south of Interstate 35.

Three noncontinuous minor stubs, all within the West Bottoms district of Kansas City, Missouri, are also designated as State Line Road. From north to south, they are:

- 0.3 miles (0.48 km) from Central Avenue to Pacific Avenue.
- 0.2 miles (0.32 km) from Butler Way to American Royal Drive.
- 0.4 miles (0.64 km) from American Royal Drive to 25th Street.

It is the dividing line between Kansas and Missouri for most of the Kansas City metropolitan area south of the Kaw Point confluence of the Kansas and Missouri rivers. Most of the road divides the Jackson County portion of Kansas City, Missouri, to the east from the Johnson County, suburbs to the west. State Line Road also services, from north to south, Westwood, Kansas; Westwood Hills, Kansas; Mission Woods, Kansas; Mission Hills, Kansas; Prairie Village, Kansas; and Leawood, Kansas. Leawood in 2001 promoted State Line Road as "The State Line Link" between the two states and many communities touched by the road.

Intermittent sections of rural road extend south of the Kansas City metropolitan area to Drexel (separating Miami County, Kansas, from Cass County, Missouri) though they are not considered part of State Line Road in local lexicon. This includes a 12.2-mile (19.6 km) section from 175th Street to 271st Street, roughly connecting Stilwell, Kansas to Cleveland, Missouri.

== Points of interest ==
- Hy-Vee Arena and American Royal Center, located in the West Bottoms
- KU Med, located along State Line Road between W 38th Street and W 41st Street.
- The Pembroke Hill School Ward Parkway Campus, located at 5121 State Line Road.
- The Carriage Club and Mission Hills Country Club, located along State Line Road between Shawnee Mission Parkway and Mission Road.
- Alexander Majors Historic Museum and Barn, a building on the National Register of Historic Places, located at 8145 State Line Road.
- Ward Parkway Center, located at 8600 Ward Parkway along State Line Road between W 85th Terrace and W 89th Street.
- Rockhurst High School, located at 9301 State Line Road.
- St. Joseph Medical Center, located at 1000 Carondelet Drive along State Line Road.
- The Barstow School, located at 11511 State Line Road.
