= Lewis, Missouri =

Unincorporated community in Missouri, U.S.

Coordinates: 38°26′07″N 93°41′30″W

Lewis is an unincorporated community in Henry County, in the U.S. state of Missouri.

== History ==
Lewis was originally called "Lewis Station", and under the latter name was platted in 1876, and named after Howell Lewis, the original owner of the town site. A post office called Lewis Station was established in 1871, and remained in operation until 1944.
