= Maureen (disambiguation) =

Maureen is a feminine given name.

Maureen may also refer to:

- Maureen (album), a 2011 album by Joy Denalane
- "Maureen", a song from Eddie Money's 1979 album, Life for the Taking
- "Maureen", a song from Nick Lowe and His Cowboy Outfit, 1984
- "Maureen", a song from Sade's 1985 album, Promise
- "Maureen", a song from Fountains of Wayne's 2005 compilation album, Out-of-State Plates
- "Maureen", a song from Young Knives' 2013 album, Sick Octave

== See also ==
- "Maureen, Maureen", a song from John Prine's 1984 album, Aimless Love
