= Roseland, Missouri =

Unincorporated community in Missouri, U.S.

Coordinates: 38°23′36″N 93°32′33″W

Roseland is an unincorporated community in Henry County, in the U.S. state of Missouri.

== History ==
A post office called Roseland was established in 1894, and remained in operation until 1921. The community was named for the wild roses at a nearby schoolyard.
