= Shawnee Mound, Missouri =

Shawnee Mound
- Unincorporated community
- Location in Missouri Location in the contiguous United States Location in North America
- Coordinates: 38°31′47″N 93°45′43″W
- Country: United States
- U.S. state: Missouri
- County: Henry

Shawnee Mound is an unincorporated community in northeastern Henry County, in the U.S. state of Missouri. The community is on Missouri Route 13 ten miles north of Clinton. Post Oak is three miles north in southern Johnson County. The Shawnee Mound church and cemetery are approximately one half mile to the southwest on a county road. The community is on a ridge between the headwaters of Sand Creek to the east and Honey Creek to the west.

== History ==
A post office was in service at Shawnee Mound from 1855 through 1901. The community was named for its location within Shawnee Township, and for a mound near the original town site.
