= Cadet Creek =

Stream in the U.S. state of Missouri

Coordinates: 38°32′05″N 92°01′38″W

Cadet Creek is a stream in northwestern Osage County in the U.S. state of Missouri. It is a tributary of the Osage River.

The stream headwaters arise in northwest Osage County at and an elevation of about 690 ft (210 m). The stream flows southwest and west to its confluence with the Osage at at an elevation of 518 ft (158 m). The confluence is about 1.5 miles south of Osage City.

Cadet Creek has the name of the local Cadet family.

== See also ==
- List of rivers of Missouri
