= Garland, Missouri =

Unincorporated community in the U.S. state of Missouri

Coordinates: 38°26′36″N 93°51′15″W

Garland (also known as Harvey) is an unincorporated community in Henry County, in the U.S. state of Missouri. The community is on an abandoned railroad line in an old coal mining area, approximately six miles northwest of Clinton, just east of Missouri Route O.

== History ==
Garland was platted ca. 1890 when the railroad was extended to that point. A post office called Garland was established in 1886, and remained in operation until 1927. The community was named after Garland Covington, the son of the original owner of the town site.
