= Fields Creek Township, Henry County, Missouri =

Township in Henry County, Missouri, U.S.

Coordinates: 38.4211034°N 93.7904854°W

Fields Creek Township is a township in Henry County, in the U.S. state of Missouri.

Fields Creek Township was established in 1873, taking its name from Joseph Fields, a pioneer citizen.
