= South Grand River =

Stream in the US state of Missouri

The South Grand River is a stream in Bates, Cass, Henry and Benton counties of west central Missouri, United States. It is a tributary of the Osage River.

The stream headwaters are in Cass County at the confluence of Massey Creek and East Creek at 38°40′03″N 94°31′56″W three miles east of Cleveland and five miles southwest of Peculiar. The stream flows southeast crossing under Missouri Route 2 near Freeman and US Route 71 near Archie. Just to the southeast of Archie the stream turns to the east and becomes the boundary between Cass and Bates counties. The stream flows east through the Settles Ford Conservation Area and enters Henry County and passes south of Urich and Missouri Route 7. The stream course turns again to the southeast passing under Missouri Route 18 west of Clinton and enters the waters of Truman Reservoir south of Clinton. The stream course continues as part of the lake passing under Missouri Route 13 south of Clinton and east into Benton County to its confluence with the Osage River one mile north of the Harry S Truman Dam at 38°16′35″N 93°24′42″W. At Brownington, the river has a mean annual discharge of 1,045 cubic feet per second.
