= Davis Township, Henry County, Missouri =

Township in Missouri, U.S.

Coordinates: 38°20′27″N 93°54′13″W

Davis Township is a township in Henry County, in the U.S. state of Missouri.

Davis Township was established in 1873, taking its name from William Davis, a pioneer citizen.
