= Hartwell, Missouri =

Census-designated place in Missouri, US

- Census-designated place
- Location of Hartwell, Missouri
- Coordinates: 38°25′59″N 93°56′03″W
- Country: United States
- State: Missouri
- County: Henry

Area
  - Total: 0.47 sq mi (1.23 km^{2})
  - Land: 0.47 sq mi (1.23 km^{2})
  - Water: 0 sq mi (0.00 km^{2})
- Elevation: 758 ft (231 m)

Population (2020)
  - Total: 15
  - Density: 32/sq mi (12.2/km^{2})
- Time zone: UTC-6 (Central (CST))
  - Summer (DST): UTC-5 (CDT)
- ZIP code: 64788
- Area code: 660
- FIPS code: 29-30772
- GNIS feature ID: 2587077

Hartwell is a former village and census-designated place in Henry County, Missouri, United States. The population was 15 at the 2020 census.

== History ==
A post office called Hartwell was established in 1887, and remained in operation until 1968. The village was named after a railroad official. Hartwell disincorporated in 1995.

== Geography ==
According to the United States Census Bureau, the CDP has a total area of 0.48 square miles (1.24 km^{2}), all land.

== Demographics ==
Historical population
| Census | Pop. | Note | %± |
|---|---|---|---|
| 2020 | 15 | | — |
U.S. Decennial Census

=== 2010 census ===
As of the census of 2010, there were 16 people, 4 households, and 4 families living in the CDP. The population density was 33.3 inhabitants per square mile (12.9/km^{2}). There were 5 housing units at an average density of 10.4 per square mile (4.0/km^{2}). The racial makeup of the CDP was 100.0% White.

There were 4 households, of which 50.0% had children under the age of 18 living with them, 75.0% were married couples living together, and 25.0% had a female householder with no husband present. 0.0% of all households were made up of individuals. The average household size was 4.00 and the average family size was 4.00.

The median age in the CDP was 34 years. 25% of residents were under the age of 18; 18.8% were between the ages of 18 and 24; 12.6% were from 25 to 44; 37.6% were from 45 to 64; and 6.3% were 65 years of age or older. The gender makeup of the CDP was 50.0% male and 50.0% female.

=== 2000 census ===
As of the census of 2000, there were 16 people, 5 households, and 3 families living in the village. The population density was 33.6 inhabitants per square mile (13.0/km^{2}). There were 5 housing units at an average density of 10.5 per square mile (4.1/km^{2}). The racial makeup of the village was 93.75% White, 6.25% from other races. Hispanic or Latino of any race were 6.25% of the population.

There were 5 households, out of which 60.0% had children under the age of 18 living with them, 60.0% were married couples living together, and 40.0% were non-families. 40.0% of all households were made up of individuals, and 20.0% had someone living alone who was 65 years of age or older. The average household size was 3.20 and the average family size was 4.67.

In the village, the population was spread out, with 50.0% under the age of 18, 6.3% from 18 to 24, 31.3% from 25 to 44, 6.3% from 45 to 64, and 6.3% who were 65 years of age or older. The median age was 18 years. For every 100 females, there were 100.0 males. For every 100 females age 18 and over, there were 100.0 males.

The median income for a household in the village was $9,375, and the median income for a family was $30,417. Males had a median income of $21,250 versus $8,750 for females. The per capita income for the village was $4,216. There are 40.0% of families living below the poverty line and 44.0% of the population, including 40.0% of those under 18 and none of those over 64.
