= Shawnee Township, Henry County, Missouri =

Township in Henry County, Missouri, U.S.

Coordinates: 38.49°N 93.77°W

Shawnee Township is a township in Henry County, in the U.S. state of Missouri.

The township is named after the Shawnee tribe of Native Americans.
