= Greenwood, Missouri =

- City
- Location of Greenwood, Missouri in Jackson County
- Coordinates: 38°51′03″N 94°20′17″W
- Country: United States
- State: Missouri
- Counties: Jackson; Cass
- Founded: 1867
- Incorporated: 1963

Government
  - Mayor: Dustin Young

Area
  - Total: 5.23 sq mi (13.54 km^{2})
  - Land: 5.22 sq mi (13.51 km^{2})
  - Water: 0.012 sq mi (0.03 km^{2})
- Elevation: 915 ft (279 m)

Population (2020)
  - Total: 6,021
  - Density: 1,154.0/sq mi (445.56/km^{2})
- Time zone: UTC-6 (Central (CST))
  - Summer (DST): UTC-5 (CDT)
- ZIP code: 64034
- Area codes: 816, 975
- FIPS code: 29-29494
- GNIS feature ID: 2394246
- Website: www.greenwoodmo.com

Greenwood is a city in Jackson and Cass counties in the U.S. state of Missouri. As of the 2020 census, Greenwood had a population of 6,021. It is part of the Kansas City metropolitan area.

== History ==
Greenwood was laid out in 1867. A post office called Greenwood has been in operation since 1866. The city was incorporated in 1963.

== Geography ==
According to the United States Census Bureau, the city has a total area of 3.97 square miles (10.28 km^{2}), all land. The town has a small creek running through it in the southwest. The area that constitutes Greenwood is mainly lightly wooded and open fields northeast of its rail line, along with several small ponds. The area southwest of the rail line is mostly suburban, featuring housing along with a small downtown area.

== Demographics ==
Historical population
Census	Pop.	Note	%±
1880	234		—
1890	296		26.5%
1960	488		—
1970	925		89.5%
1980	1,315		42.2%
1990	1,505		14.4%
2000	3,952		162.6%
2010	5,221		32.1%
2020	6,021		15.3%
U.S. Decennial Census

=== Racial and ethnic composition ===
Greenwood city, Missouri – Racial and ethnic composition Note: the US Census treats Hispanic/Latino as an ethnic category. This table excludes Latinos from the racial categories and assigns them to a separate category. Hispanics/Latinos may be of any race.
Race / Ethnicity (NH = Non-Hispanic)	Pop 2000	Pop 2010	Pop 2020	% 2000	% 2010	% 2020
White alone (NH)	3,700	4,669	5,043	93.62%	89.43%	83.76%
Black or African American alone (NH)	88	257	282	2.23%	4.92%	4.68%
Native American or Alaska Native alone (NH)	12	18	11	0.30%	0.34%	0.18%
Asian alone (NH)	17	27	31	0.43%	0.52%	0.51%
Native Hawaiian or Pacific Islander alone (NH)	2	0	5	0.05%	0.00%	0.08%
Other race alone (NH)	0	1	7	0.00%	0.02%	0.12%
Mixed race or Multiracial (NH)	50	74	351	1.27%	1.42%	5.83%
Hispanic or Latino (any race)	83	175	291	2.10%	3.35%	4.83%
Total	3,952	5,221	6,021	100.00%	100.00%	100.00%

=== 2020 census ===
As of the 2020 census, Greenwood had a population of 6,021. The median age was 34.1 years. 29.3% of residents were under the age of 18 and 8.3% of residents were 65 years of age or older. For every 100 females there were 97.2 males, and for every 100 females age 18 and over there were 95.5 males age 18 and over.

88.2% of residents lived in urban areas, while 11.8% lived in rural areas.

There were 2,047 households in Greenwood, of which 48.2% had children under the age of 18 living in them. Of all households, 63.8% were married-couple households, 11.5% were households with a male householder and no spouse or partner present, and 18.5% were households with a female householder and no spouse or partner present. About 14.1% of all households were made up of individuals and 4.5% had someone living alone who was 65 years of age or older.

There were 2,103 housing units, of which 2.7% were vacant. The homeowner vacancy rate was 0.9% and the rental vacancy rate was 8.0%.

Racial composition as of the 2020 census
Race	Number	Percent
White	5,137	85.3%
Black or African American	289	4.8%
American Indian and Alaska Native	18	0.3%
Asian	35	0.6%
Native Hawaiian and Other Pacific Islander	6	0.1%
Some other race	73	1.2%
Two or more races	463	7.7%

=== 2010 census ===
As of the census of 2010, there were 5,221 people, 1,769 households, and 1,412 families living in the city. The population density was 1,315.1 inhabitants per square mile (507.8/km^{2}). There were 1,838 housing units at an average density of 463.0 per square mile (178.8/km^{2}). The racial makeup of the city was 91.7% White, 5.1% African American, 0.3% Native American, 0.5% Asian, 0.7% from other races, and 1.7% from two or more races. Hispanic or Latino of any race were 3.4% of the population.

There were 1,769 households, of which 51.0% had children under the age of 18 living with them, 66.2% were married couples living together, 8.9% had a female householder with no husband present, 4.7% had a male householder with no wife present, and 20.2% were non-families. 15.1% of all households were made up of individuals, and 2.6% had someone living alone who was 65 years of age or older. The average household size was 2.95 and the average family size was 3.30.

The median age in the city was 32.2 years. 32.6% of residents were under the age of 18; 6.7% were between the ages of 18 and 24; 34% were from 25 to 44; 20.6% were from 45 to 64; and 6.2% were 65 years of age or older. The gender makeup of the city was 49.9% male and 50.1% female.

=== 2000 census ===
As of the census of 2000, there were 3,952 people, 1,352 households, and 1,122 families living in the city. The population density was 978.3 inhabitants per square mile (377.7/km^{2}). There were 1,407 housing units at an average density of 348.3 per square mile (134.5/km^{2}). The racial makeup of the city was 95.07% White, 2.25% African American, 0.30% Native American, 0.46% Asian, 0.05% Pacific Islander, 0.56% from other races, and 1.32% from two or more races. Hispanic or Latino of any race were 2.10% of the population.

There were 1,352 households, out of which 49.8% had children under the age of 18 living with them, 71.6% were married couples living together, 7.8% had a female householder with no husband present, and 17.0% were non-families. 13.2% of all households were made up of individuals, and 2.1% had someone living alone who was 65 years of age or older. The average household size was 2.92 and the average family size was 3.21.

In the city the population was spread out, with 32.6% under the age of 18, 6.0% from 18 to 24, 43.5% from 25 to 44, 12.9% from 45 to 64, and 4.9% who were 65 years of age or older. The median age was 30 years. For every 100 females, there were 101.0 males. For every 100 females age 18 and over, there were 98.8 males.

The median income for a household in the city was $62,574, and the median income for a family was $65,313. Males had a median income of $42,173 versus $28,750 for females. The per capita income for the city was $21,586. About 2.9% of families and 3.9% of the population were below the poverty line, including 5.7% of those under age 18 and 9.4% of those age 65 or over.

== Education ==
All of Greenwood in Jackson County, making up the vast majority of the municipality, is within the Lee's Summit R-VII School District. The very small Cass County portion is split between the Lee's Summit district and the Pleasant Hill R-III School District.

The Lee's Summit district elementary schools that serve the parts of Greenwood include Greenwood Elementary (in Greenwood), Sunset Valley (Lee's Summit), and Woodland (Lee's Summit). The areas of Greenwood Elementary are in the boundaries of Summit Lakes Middle School, while the boundaries of Sunset Valley and Woodland are zoned to East Trails Middle School. In the areas of Greenwood for high school, all of Summit Lakes and a small portion of East Trails go to Lee's Summit West High School, located in southern Lee's Summit, and the rest of East Trails area that serve Greenwood are zoned to Lee's Summit High School, located near downtown Lee's Summit.

Metropolitan Community College has the Lee's Summit school district in its in-district taxation area. The community college district has the Pleasant Hill school district area in its service area, but not its in-district taxation area.

== Transportation ==
Route 150 is a highway linking Greenwood to Southern Lee's Summit, Grandview, and to Overland Park at State Line Road.
