= Miller Branch =

Stream in Vernon County, Missouri

Coordinates: 38.0351625°N 94.0886677°W

Miller Branch is a stream in Vernon County in the U.S. state of Missouri. It is a tributary of the Osage River.

Miller Branch has the name of a pioneer citizen.

== See also ==
- List of rivers of Missouri
