= Greenview, Missouri =

Greenview
- Unincorporated Community
- Location within Missouri Location within the United States
- Coordinates: 38°5′52.45″N 92°49′15.96″W
- Country: United States
- State: Missouri
- ZIP code: 65020

Greenview is an unincorporated community near the Lake of the Ozarks in Camden County, Missouri. It is located on the intersection of Missouri Route 5 and Route 7. The zip code is 65020.
