= Clinton Township, Henry County, Missouri =

Township in Henry County, Missouri, U.S.

Coordinates: 38.3369°N 93.7872°W

Clinton Township is a township in Henry County, in the U.S. state of Missouri.

Clinton Township takes its name from the community of Clinton, Missouri.
