= Trap Branch =

Stream in the American state of Missouri

Coordinates: 38.227525°N 93.873549°W

Trap Branch is a stream in Henry County in the U.S. state of Missouri.

Trap Branch was named for the fact a large portion of the early settlers were trappers.

== See also ==
- List of rivers of Missouri
