= Big Creek Township, Henry County, Missouri =

Township in Henry County, Missouri, U.S.

Coordinates: 38.513009°N 93.8999403°W

Big Creek Township is a township in Henry County, in the U.S. state of Missouri.

Big Creek Township takes its name from Big Creek.
