= Springfield Township, Henry County, Missouri =

Township in Henry County, Missouri, U.S.

Coordinates: 38.4172°N 93.5719°W

Springfield Township is a township in Henry County, in the U.S. state of Missouri.

The township's name is a transfer from Springfield, Ohio.
