= Harding Creek (Missouri) =

River in Missouri, United States

Coordinates: 38°33′14″N 94°32′18″W

Harding Creek (also known as Hardin Creek) is a stream in Cass County in the U.S. state of Missouri. It is a tributary of the South Fork of the South Grand River.

Harding Creek was named after the local Hardin family.

== See also ==
- List of rivers of Missouri
