= Missouri Route 150 =

State highway in Missouri, U.S.

Route 150
- MO 150 highlighted in red

Route information
- Maintained by MoDOT
- Length: 25.662 mi (41.299 km)
- Existed: 1949–present

Major junctions
- West end: State Line Road / 135th Street at the Kansas state line in Martin City
- I-49 / US 71 near Grandview; Route 291 near Greenwood; Route 7 near Greenwood
- East end: US 50 in Lone Jack

Location
- Country: United States
- State: Missouri

Highway system
- Missouri State Highway System; Interstate; US; State; Supplemental
← Route 149	→ Route 151

Route 150 is a highway on the south side of the Kansas City, Missouri Metro Area. It runs east from the Kansas–Missouri state border to US 50 in Lone Jack, its length totaling to around 25.6 miles.

== Route description ==
In the west, Route 150 begins as it crosses from Kansas into Missouri. The highway initially heads southeastward, but soon turns towards the east and passes along the northern boundary of the former Richards-Gebaur Air Force Base. It has an interchange with I-49/US 71 and takes on the name East 147th Street. Continuing east, it then transitions into East Outer Belt Road before meeting an interchange with Route 291. Route 150 bypasses the James A. Reed Memorial Wildlife Area to the south, and its local name changes several times. East of Greenwood, it has a short concurrency with Route 7. The roughly half-mile south–north concurrency ends when Route 150 bears east through rural land. It turns due north on South Bynum Road once in Lone Jack and eventually terminates at US 50.

== History ==
Modern-day Route 150 was once a Missouri supplemental route. The current designation was assigned in its entirety by 1949.

Until the 1990s, Route 150 continued into Kansas as K-150.

Route 150 underwent an improvement project, including reconstruction of the I-49/US 71 interchange and widening. The three-phase project began in the summer of 2010 and was completed in 2012.

== Junction list ==
The entire route is in Jackson County.

Location	mi	km	Destinations	Notes
Kansas City	0.000	0.000	State Line Road / Kenneth Parkway	Kansas–Missouri state line; road continues into Leawood, Kansas as 135th Street
Kansas City	2.285	3.677	Route D (Holmes Road)	Interchange
Kansas City	3.730	6.003	Thunderbird Road	Interchange; westbound exit and eastbound entrance only, converted from existing intersection on December 5, 2012.
Kansas City	4.387– 4.396	7.060– 7.075	Botts Road	Diverging diamond interchange, converted from existing intersection on December 5, 2012.
Kansas City	5.401	8.692	I-49 / US 71 – Kansas City, Joplin	I-49 exit 177
Lee's Summit	13.626	21.929	Route 291 – Harrisonville, Lee's Summit	Interchange
Greenwood	19.786	31.842	Route 7 south – Pleasant Hill	Western end of concurrency
Greenwood	20.286	32.647	Route 7 north – Blue Springs	Eastern end of concurrency
Lone Jack	25.558– 25.571	41.132– 41.153	US 50 – Warrensburg, Lee's Summit	Interchange; road continues north as Bynum Road
Lone Jack	25.662	41.299	Old U.S. Route 50	Eastern terminus
1.000 mi = 1.609 km; 1.000 km = 0.621 mi
