= Maurine, Missouri =

Unincorporated community in Missouri, U.S.

Coordinates: 38°29′27″N 93°54′45″W

Maurine is an unincorporated community in Henry County, in the U.S. state of Missouri.

== History ==
Maurine was platted in 1885, and named by a first settler in memory of his child who had died in infancy. A post office called Maurine was established in 1885, and remained in operation until 1909.
