= Harding Creek (South Dakota) =

Stream in South Dakota, US

Coordinates: 44°34′06″N 101°43′20″W

Harding Creek is a stream in the U.S. state of South Dakota.

Harding Creek has the name of William Harding, an early settler.

== See also ==
- List of rivers of South Dakota
