= Osage Township, Morgan County, Missouri =

Township in the U.S. state of Missouri

Coordinates: 38.2786°N 92.7883°W

Osage Township is a township in Morgan County, in the U.S. state of Missouri.

Osage Township, like the Osage River, derives its name from the Osage Nation.
