= Missouri Route 18 =

State highway in Missouri, U.S.

Route 18

Route information
- Maintained by MoDOT
- Length: 55.88 mi (89.93 km)

Major junctions
- West end: 359th Street / State Line Road at the Kansas state line in Drexel
- I-49 / US 71 in Adrian
- East end: Route 7 / Route 13 / Route 52 in Clinton

Location
- Country: United States
- State: Missouri

Highway system
- Missouri State Highway System; Interstate; US; State; Supplemental
← Route 17	→ Route 19

Route 18 is a highway in western Missouri. Its eastern terminus is at the intersection of Route 13/Route 52 and Route 7 in Clinton. Its western terminus is at the Kansas state line near Drexel. It continues into Kansas as a county road.

== Route description ==
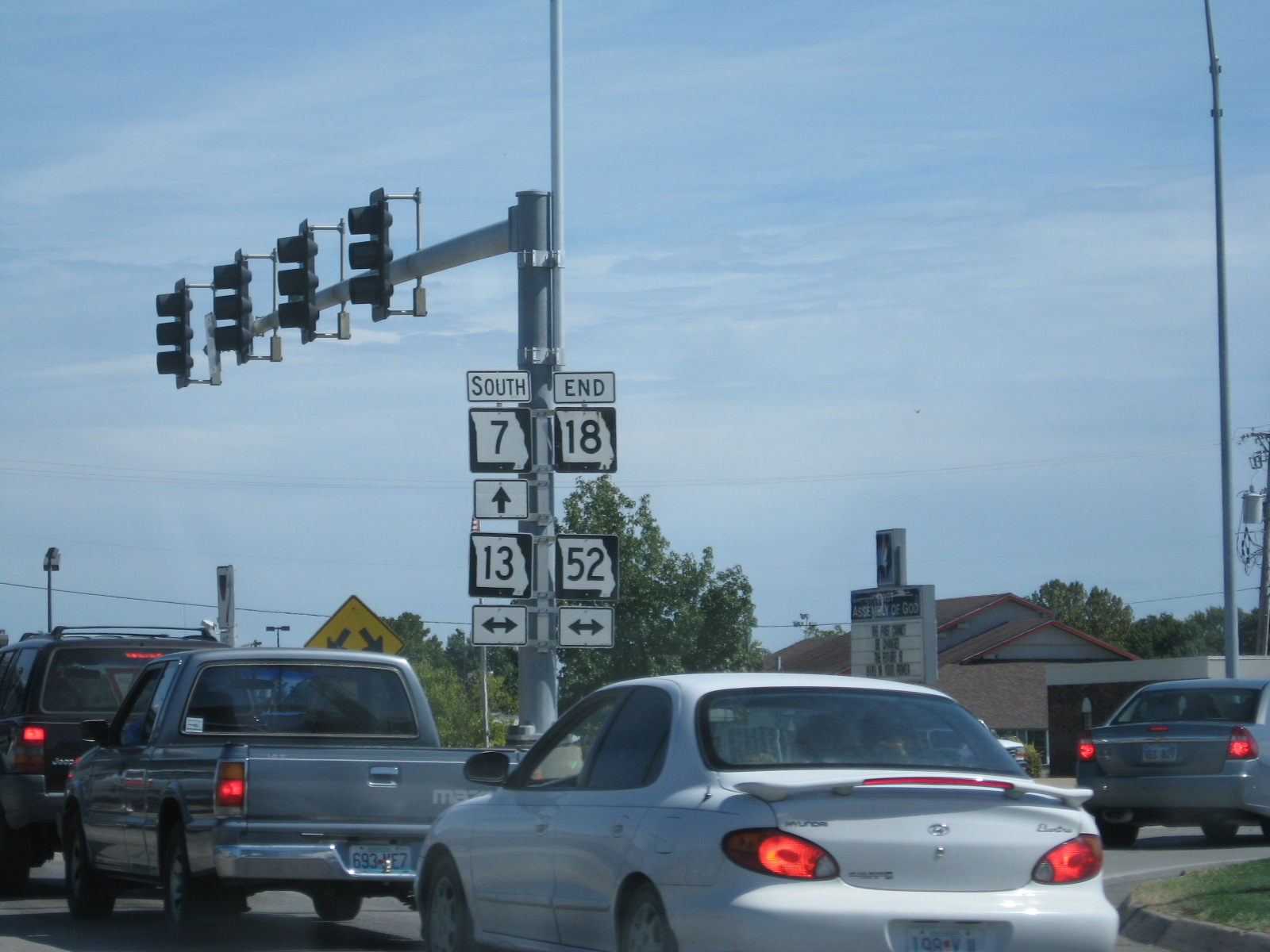
Route 18's eastern terminus at Route 7/13/52 in Clinton.

Route 18 begins at the Kansas state line just west of Drexel. It runs for three miles (5 km) along the Cass/Bates County line. Route 18 then turns south to Merwin, where it turns back east. It then runs through Adrian, before having a diamond interchange with the Interstate 49/U.S. Route 71 freeway. Route 18 then runs south of Altona and through Ballard. It then runs through Clinton. Route 18 then ends at Routes 7, 13, and 52.

== Major intersections ==
County	Location	mi	km	Destinations	Notes
Bates	Drexel	0.00	0.00	359th Street / State Line Road	Western terminus; Kansas state line
Bates	Adrian	20.84	33.54	I-49 / US 71	I-49 exit 141; diamond interchange
Henry	Clinton	54.69	88.02	Route 13 Bus. (2nd Street)	
Henry	Clinton	55.88	89.93	Route 7 / Route 13 / Route 52	Eastern terminus
1.000 mi = 1.609 km; 1.000 km = 0.621 mi

== See also ==
- List of state highways in Missouri
