= Fields Creek (Kanawha River tributary) =

Stream in the American state of West Virginia

Coordinates: 38°12′52″N 81°31′24″W

Fields Creek is a stream in the U.S. state of West Virginia. It is a tributary of the Kanawha River and flows entirely within Kanawha County, West Virginia. It has a watershed area of approximately 12 square miles (31 km^{2}).

Fields Creek was named after Colonel John Fields, a pioneer soldier.

Fields Creek was the site of a February 2014 coal slurry spill from a Patriot Coal facility.

== See also ==
- List of rivers of West Virginia
