= Leesville, Missouri =

Unincorporated community in the US state of Missouri

Coordinates: 38°20′55″N 93°32′41″W

Leesville is an unincorporated community in Henry County, in the U.S. state of Missouri.

== History ==
Leesville was originally called "Tebo", and under the latter name was platted in 1854. A post office called Leesville was established in 1857, and remained in operation until 1918. The present name is after Andrew Jackson Lee, an early settler.
