= Brownington, Missouri =

- Town
- Location of Brownington, Missouri
- Coordinates: 38°14′43″N 93°43′22″W
- Country: United States
- State: Missouri
- County: Henry
- Incorporated: 1870

Area
  - Total: 0.12 sq mi (0.31 km^{2})
  - Land: 0.12 sq mi (0.31 km^{2})
  - Water: 0 sq mi (0.00 km^{2})
- Elevation: 748 ft (228 m)

Population (2020)
  - Total: 71
  - Density: 585.7/sq mi (226.14/km^{2})
- Time zone: UTC-6 (Central (CST))
  - Summer (DST): UTC-5 (CDT)
- FIPS code: 29-08902
- GNIS feature ID: 2396610
- Website: no website

Brownington is a town in Henry County, Missouri, United States. As of the 2020 census, Brownington had a population of 71.

== History ==
The town of Brownington was first located in the year 1869, and joined that of Consville and was laid out by William N. Doyle. Consville, however, was founded in 1867, but the two communities have since merged.

== Geography ==
According to the United States Census Bureau, the city has a total area of 0.12 square miles (0.31 km^{2}), all land.

== Demographics ==
Historical population
Census	Pop.	Note	%±
1880	251		—
1890	329		31.1%
1900	407		23.7%
1910	348		−14.5%
1920	333		−4.3%
1930	266		−20.1%
1940	261		−1.9%
1950	179		−31.4%
1960	130		−27.4%
1970	95		−26.9%
1980	112		17.9%
1990	84		−25.0%
2000	119		41.7%
2010	107		−10.1%
2020	71		−33.6%
U.S. Decennial Census

=== 2010 census ===
As of the census of 2010, there were 107 people, 45 households, and 32 families living in the city. The population density was 891.7 inhabitants per square mile (344.3/km^{2}). There were 50 housing units at an average density of 416.7 per square mile (160.9/km^{2}). The racial makeup of the city was 95.3% White, 2.8% Native American, and 1.9% from two or more races.

There were 45 households, of which 24.4% had children under the age of 18 living with them, 46.7% were married couples living together, 17.8% had a female householder with no husband present, 6.7% had a male householder with no wife present, and 28.9% were non-families. 24.4% of all households were made up of individuals, and 4.4% had someone living alone who was 65 years of age or older. The average household size was 2.38 and the average family size was 2.84.

The median age in the city was 46.8 years. 22.4% of residents were under the age of 18; 5.6% were between the ages of 18 and 24; 20.5% were from 25 to 44; 33.6% were from 45 to 64; and 17.8% were 65 years of age or older. The gender makeup of the city was 49.5% male and 50.5% female.

=== 2000 census ===
As of the census of 2000, there were 119 people, 45 households, and 32 families living in the town. The population density was 811.1 inhabitants per square mile (313.2/km^{2}). There were 68 housing units at an average density of 463.5 per square mile (179.0/km^{2}). The racial makeup of the town was 95.80% White, 1.68% African American and 2.52% Native American.

There were 45 households, out of which 28.9% had children under the age of 18 living with them, 64.4% were married couples living together, 4.4% had a female householder with no husband present, and 26.7% were non-families. 15.6% of all households were made up of individuals, and 11.1% had someone living alone who was 65 years of age or older. The average household size was 2.64 and the average family size was 3.00.

In the town the population was spread out, with 24.4% under the age of 18, 5.9% from 18 to 24, 21.0% from 25 to 44, 31.9% from 45 to 64, and 16.8% who were 65 years of age or older. The median age was 42 years. For every 100 females, there were 98.3 males. For every 100 females age 18 and over, there were 109.3 males.

The median income for a household in the town was $17,250, and the median income for a family was $27,750. Males had a median income of $18,750 versus $15,500 for females. The per capita income for the town was $8,174. There were 16.1% of families and 21.1% of the population living below the poverty line, including 20.6% of under eighteens and 32.1% of those over 64.
