= La Due, Henry County, Missouri =

La Due, Missouri
- Inactive Village
- Coordinates: 38°18′45″N 93°52′40″W
- Country: United States
- State: Missouri
- County: Henry
- Incorporated: January 1, 1936

Area
  - Total: 0.081 sq mi (0.21 km^{2})
  - Land: 0.081 sq mi (0.21 km^{2})
  - Water: 0 sq mi (0.00 km^{2})
- Elevation: 748 ft (228 m)

Population (2020)
  - Total: 27
  - Density: 335.8/sq mi (129.65/km^{2})
- Time zone: UTC-6 (Central (CST))
  - Summer (DST): UTC-5 (CST)
- ZIP code: 64735
- Area code: 660
- FIPS code: 29-39638
- GNIS feature ID: 2398363

La Due is an inactive village in Henry County, Missouri, United States. The population was 28 at the 2010 census.

== History ==
La Due was platted in 1870, and named after A. D. Ladue, a railroad official. A post office called La Due was established in 1872, and remained in operation until 1973.

== Geography ==
According to the United States Census Bureau, the village has a total area of 0.08 square miles (0.21 km^{2}), all land.

== Demographics ==
Historical population
| Census | Pop. | Note | %± |
|---|---|---|---|
| 1990 | 20 | | — |
| 2000 | 39 | | 95.0% |
| 2010 | 28 | | −28.2% |
| 2020 | 27 | | −3.6% |
U.S. Decennial Census

=== 2010 census ===
As of the census of 2010, there were 28 people, 15 households, and 6 families living in the village. The population density was 350.0 inhabitants per square mile (135.1/km^{2}). There were 24 housing units at an average density of 300.0 per square mile (115.8/km^{2}). The racial makeup of the village was 85.7% White, 3.6% Asian, and 10.7% from two or more races.

There were 15 households, of which 6.7% had children under the age of 18 living with them, 33.3% were married couples living together, 6.7% had a female householder with no husband present, and 60.0% were non-families. 40.0% of all households were made up of individuals, and 20% had someone living alone who was 65 years of age or older. The average household size was 1.87 and the average family size was 2.50.

The median age in the village was 56.3 years. 7.1% of residents were under the age of 18; 3.6% were between the ages of 18 and 24; 7.2% were from 25 to 44; 53.6% were from 45 to 64; and 28.6% were 65 years of age or older. The gender makeup of the village was 42.9% male and 57.1% female.

=== 2000 census ===
As of the census of 2000, there were 39 people, 15 households, and 10 families living in the village. The population density was 483.5 inhabitants per square mile (186.7/km^{2}). There were 18 housing units at an average density of 223.1 per square mile (86.1/km^{2}). The racial makeup of the village was 94.87% White, 2.56% Native American, and 2.56% from two or more races.

There were 15 households, out of which 33.3% had children under the age of 18 living with them, 53.3% were married couples living together, 13.3% had a female householder with no husband present, and 26.7% were non-families. 20.0% of all households were made up of individuals, and none had someone living alone who was 65 years of age or older. The average household size was 2.60 and the average family size was 3.00.

In the village, the population was spread out, with 28.2% under the age of 18, 12.8% from 18 to 24, 23.1% from 25 to 44, 12.8% from 45 to 64, and 23.1% who were 65 years of age or older. The median age was 34 years. For every 100 females, there were 116.7 males. For every 100 females age 18 and over, there were 115.4 males.

The median income for a household in the village was $23,750, and the median income for a family was $10,417. Males had a median income of $28,750 versus $11,250 for females. The per capita income for the village was $9,120. There were 46.2% of families and 45.7% of the population living below the poverty line, including 78.6% of under eighteens and 20.0% of those over 64.
