= Osage Township, Cole County, Missouri =

Inactive township in the American state of Missouri

Coordinates: 38.4350°N 92.2078°W

Osage Township is an inactive township in Cole County, in the U.S. state of Missouri.

Osage Township was named after the Osage River.
