= Bogard Township, Henry County, Missouri =

Township in the American state of Missouri

Coordinates: 38.5154813°N 94.0106256°W

Bogard Township is a township in Henry County, in the U.S. state of Missouri.

Bogard Township was established in 1857, taking its name from a creek of the same name.
