= Maureen Cummins =

American artist

Maureen Cummins (born 1963) is an American artist specializing in artists' books. In 1991, she founded Inanna Press (pronounced "ee-na-na" and named after the Mesopotamian goddess of the same name). She remains the proprietor and continues to produce fine, limited-edition artists' books. Since 1993, when she created her own studio in Park Slope, Brooklyn, Cummins has produced over twenty-five limited-edition artists' books. Her work is held in over one hundred public and institutional collections around the world. She has been featured in shows with Kiki Smith, Fred Tomaselli, and Kara Walker. One of her books, Ghost Diary, held by the Arthur and Mata Jaffe Center for Book Arts at Florida Atlantic University, is made of glass.

== Early life and education ==
Born in New York City, Cummins studied printmaking and book arts at the Cooper Union School of Art, graduating in 1985 with a BFA. She lives in High Falls, New York.

== Themes ==
Cummins works mainly with printed matter, such as newspapers, letters, and checks. While initially she focused on everyday ephemera (self-described "dumpster diving" in Brooklyn), her later work turns to institutional collections, working to get readers to question their assumptions about the nature of historical authority while focusing on historical events such as the Salem Witch Trials or disasters like the Triangle Shirtwaist Factory fire. This work focuses particularly on "social issues like women’s rights, race relations, human oppression and torture, poverty, identity, and mental illness," and Cummins hopes to "snare" viewers by showing them familiar images before surprising them with new information.

== Awards ==
- Pollock-Krasner Award, 2009
- "Anatomy of Insanity": Pyramid Atlantic Book Fair Critic’s Award, 2008
- Puffin Foundation Individual Artist Grant, 2003
- New York State Council of the Arts, 2002
- New Art Forum Book Award for “creative excellence” in an artist’s book, 2000.
