= Blairstown, Missouri =

- City
- Location of Blairstown, Missouri
- Coordinates: 38°33′29″N 93°57′28″W
- Country: United States
- State: Missouri
- County: Henry

Area
  - Total: 0.25 sq mi (0.64 km^{2})
  - Land: 0.25 sq mi (0.64 km^{2})
  - Water: 0 sq mi (0.00 km^{2})
- Elevation: 784 ft (239 m)

Population (2020)
  - Total: 95
  - Density: 381.8/sq mi (147.42/km^{2})
- Time zone: UTC-6 (Central (CST))
  - Summer (DST): UTC-5 (CDT)
- ZIP code: 64726
- Area code: 660
- FIPS code: 29-06238
- GNIS feature ID: 2394187

Blairstown is a city in Henry County, Missouri, United States. As of the 2020 census, Blairstown had a population of 95.

== History ==
Blairstown got its start when the railroad was extended to that point. A post office called Blairstown has been in operation since 1886. The city was named after railroad magnate John Insley Blair.

== Geography ==
According to the United States Census Bureau, the city has a total area of 0.25 square miles (0.65 km^{2}), all land.

== Demographics ==
Historical population
Census	Pop.	Note	%±
1900	291		—
1910	288		−1.0%
1920	280		−2.8%
1930	237		−15.4%
1940	214		−9.7%
1950	199		−7.0%
1960	177		−11.1%
1970	161		−9.0%
1980	144		−10.6%
1990	185		28.5%
2000	141		−23.8%
2010	97		−31.2%
2020	95		−2.1%
U.S. Decennial Census

=== 2010 census ===
As of the census of 2010, there were 97 people, 41 households, and 25 families living in the city. The population density was 388.0 inhabitants per square mile (149.8/km^{2}). There were 60 housing units at an average density of 240.0 per square mile (92.7/km^{2}). The racial makeup of the city was 89.7% White and 10.3% from two or more races. Hispanic or Latino of any race were 2.1% of the population.

There were 41 households, of which 31.7% had children under the age of 18 living with them, 34.1% were married couples living together, 22.0% had a female householder with no husband present, 4.9% had a male householder with no wife present, and 39.0% were non-families. 29.3% of all households were made up of individuals, and 2.4% had someone living alone who was 65 years of age or older. The average household size was 2.37 and the average family size was 3.00.

The median age in the city was 38.8 years. 21.6% of residents were under the age of 18; 10.4% were between the ages of 18 and 24; 31.9% were from 25 to 44; 26.8% were from 45 to 64; and 9.3% were 65 years of age or older. The gender makeup of the city was 49.5% male and 50.5% female.

=== 2000 census ===
As of the census of 2000, there were 141 people, 56 households, and 38 families living in the city. The population density was 569.7 inhabitants per square mile (220.0/km^{2}). There were 69 housing units at an average density of 278.8 per square mile (107.6/km^{2}). The racial makeup of the city was 95.74% White, 0.71% African American, 1.42% Native American, 2.13% from other races. Hispanic or Latino of any race were 3.55% of the population.

There were 56 households, out of which 33.9% had children under the age of 18 living with them, 46.4% were married couples living together, 14.3% had a female householder with no husband present, and 30.4% were non-families. 30.4% of all households were made up of individuals, and 12.5% had someone living alone who was 65 years of age or older. The average household size was 2.52 and the average family size was 3.10.

In the city the population was spread out, with 29.1% under the age of 18, 11.3% from 18 to 24, 26.2% from 25 to 44, 21.3% from 45 to 64, and 12.1% who were 65 years of age or older. The median age was 30 years. For every 100 females, there were 98.6 males. For every 100 females age 18 and over, there were 96.1 males.

The median income for a household in the city was $21,250, and the median income for a family was $21,500. Males had a median income of $25,833 versus $20,500 for females. The per capita income for the city was $9,613. There were 13.6% of families and 21.2% of the population living below the poverty line, including 28.8% of under eighteens and 10.5% of those over 64.
