= Osage Township, Laclede County, Missouri =

Township in Laclede County, Missouri, U.S.

Coordinates: 37.6542°N 92.4864°W

Osage Township is an inactive township in Laclede County, in the U.S. state of Missouri.

Osage Township was erected in 1849, taking its name from the Osage River.
