= Urich (surname) =

Urich is the surname of the following people

- Doc Urich (1928–1997), American football player and coach
- Robert Urich (1946–2002), American film, television and stage actor and television producer
- Ben Urich, fictional uncle of Phil Urich, reporter in works of Marvel Comics
- Phil Urich, fictional nephew of Ben Urich, former Green Goblin, and current Hobgoblin in works of Marvel Comics
