= Osage Township, St. Clair County, Missouri =

Inactive township in the American state of Missouri

Coordinates: 38.0497°N 93.8944°W

Osage Township is an inactive township in St. Clair County, in the U.S. state of Missouri.

Osage Township was erected in ca. 1890, taking its name from the Osage River.
