= Osage Township, Miller County, Missouri =

Inactive township in the U.S. state of Missouri

Coordinates: 38.2414°N 92.2922°W

Osage Township is an inactive township in Miller County, in the U.S. state of Missouri.

Osage Township took its name from the Osage River.
