= Deepwater, Missouri =

City in Henry County, Missouri, United States

- City
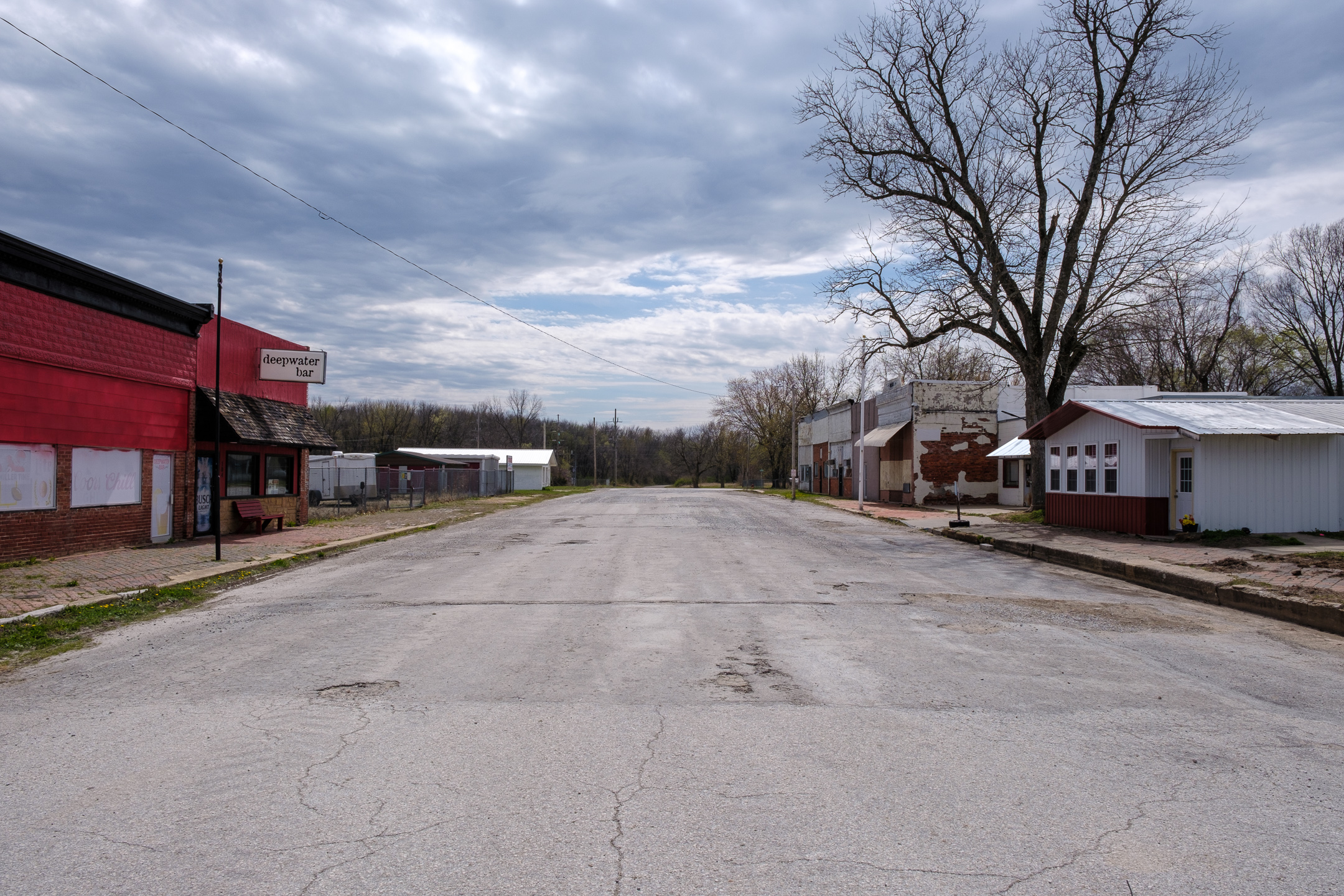

- Location of Deepwater, Missouri
- Coordinates: 38°15′33″N 93°46′29″W
- Country: United States
- State: Missouri
- County: Henry
- Incorporated: 1885

Area
  - Total: 0.86 sq mi (2.22 km^{2})
  - Land: 0.85 sq mi (2.20 km^{2})
  - Water: 0.012 sq mi (0.03 km^{2})
- Elevation: 748 ft (228 m)

Population (2020)
  - Total: 355
  - Density: 418.5/sq mi (161.58/km^{2})
- Time zone: UTC-6 (Central (CST))
  - Summer (DST): UTC-5 (CDT)
- ZIP code: 64740
- Area code: 660
- FIPS code: 29-18730
- GNIS feature ID: 2394487

Deepwater is a city in Henry County, Missouri, United States. As of the 2020 census, Deepwater had a population of 355.

== History ==
Deepwater was laid out in 1885, taking its name from nearby Deepwater Creek. A post office called Deepwater has been in operation since 1885.

== Geography ==
Deepwater is located at 38°15′37″N 93°46′31″W.

According to the United States Census Bureau, the city has a total area of 0.86 square miles (2.23 km^{2}), of which 0.85 square miles (2.20 km^{2}) is land and 0.01 square miles (0.03 km^{2}) is water.

== Demographics ==
Historical population
Census	Pop.	Note	%±
1890	1,102		—
1900	1,201		9.0%
1910	1,398		16.4%
1920	1,391		−0.5%
1930	1,093		−21.4%
1940	956		−12.5%
1950	885		−7.4%
1960	712		−19.5%
1970	565		−20.6%
1980	475		−15.9%
1990	441		−7.2%
2000	507		15.0%
2010	433		−14.6%
2020	355		−18.0%
U.S. Decennial Census

=== 2010 census ===
As of the census of 2010, there were 433 people, 188 households, and 125 families living in the city. The population density was 509.4 inhabitants per square mile (196.7/km^{2}). There were 240 housing units at an average density of 282.4 per square mile (109.0/km^{2}). The racial makeup of the city was 98.8% White, 0.5% Native American, and 0.7% from two or more races. Hispanic or Latino of any race were 1.6% of the population.

There were 188 households, of which 25.0% had children under the age of 18 living with them, 42.0% were married couples living together, 17.6% had a female householder with no husband present, 6.9% had a male householder with no wife present, and 33.5% were non-families. 25.0% of all households were made up of individuals, and 11.7% had someone living alone who was 65 years of age or older. The average household size was 2.30 and the average family size was 2.70.

The median age in the city was 45.1 years. 18% of residents were under the age of 18; 7.8% were between the ages of 18 and 24; 24% were from 25 to 44; 29.1% were from 45 to 64; and 21% were 65 years of age or older. The gender makeup of the city was 49.0% male and 51.0% female.

=== 2000 census ===
As of the census of 2000, there were 507 people, 212 households, and 143 families living in the city. The population density was 593.9 inhabitants per square mile (229.3/km^{2}). There were 248 housing units at an average density of 290.5 per square mile (112.2/km^{2}). The racial makeup of the city was 97.63% White, 1.58% African American and 0.79% Native American. Hispanic or Latino of any race were 1.58% of the population.

There were 212 households, out of which 25.0% had children under the age of 18 living with them, 49.5% were married couples living together, 12.7% had a female householder with no husband present, and 32.1% were non-families. 27.4% of all households were made up of individuals, and 13.7% had someone living alone who was 65 years of age or older. The average household size was 2.39 and the average family size was 2.79.

In the city the population was spread out, with 24.7% under the age of 18, 7.3% from 18 to 24, 25.2% from 25 to 44, 24.9% from 45 to 64, and 17.9% who were 65 years of age or older. The median age was 38 years. For every 100 females, there were 101.2 males. For every 100 females age 18 and over, there were 97.9 males.

The median income for a household in the city was $24,722, and the median income for a family was $29,423. Males had a median income of $26,000 versus $13,875 for females. The per capita income for the city was $11,721. About 17.1% of families and 20.9% of the population were below the poverty line, including 23.1% of those under age 18 and 15.9% of those age 65 or over.

== Notable people ==
- Eugene McCown - jazz pianist and painter (raised in Deepwater)
- Gladys Swarthout- opera singer
- Pearce Chiles- American Professional Baseball Player
- Herbert Sorrell - American labor leader and Hollywood union organizer

== See also ==
- List of cities in Missouri
