= Huntingdale, Missouri =

Unincorporated community in Missouri, US

Coordinates: 38°28′36″N 93°49′02″W

Huntingdale is an unincorporated community in Henry County, in the U.S. state of Missouri.

== History ==
A post office called Huntingdale was established in 1856, and remained in operation until 1907. The community was named for a hunting ground near the original town site.
