= Osage Township, Crawford County, Missouri =

Inactive township in the US state of Missouri

Coordinates: 37.78°N 91.20°W

Osage Township is an inactive township in Crawford County, in the U.S. state of Missouri.

Osage Township was established in 1847, deriving its name from the Osage Nation.
