= Honey Creek (Big Creek tributary) =

Stream in the American state of Missouri

Honey Creek is a stream in Henry and Johnson counties of Missouri. It is a tributary of Big Creek.

The stream headwaters are at 38°34′21″N 93°47′58″W and the confluence with Big Creek is at 38°26′44″N 93°53′53″W.

Honey Creek was named for the honey bees near its course.

== See also ==
- List of rivers of Missouri
