= Osage Township, Henry County, Missouri =

Township in Henry County, Missouri, U.S.

Coordinates: 38.24°N 93.65°W

Osage Township is a township in Henry County, in the U.S. state of Missouri.

Osage Township takes its name from the Osage River.
