= Drexel, Missouri =

- City
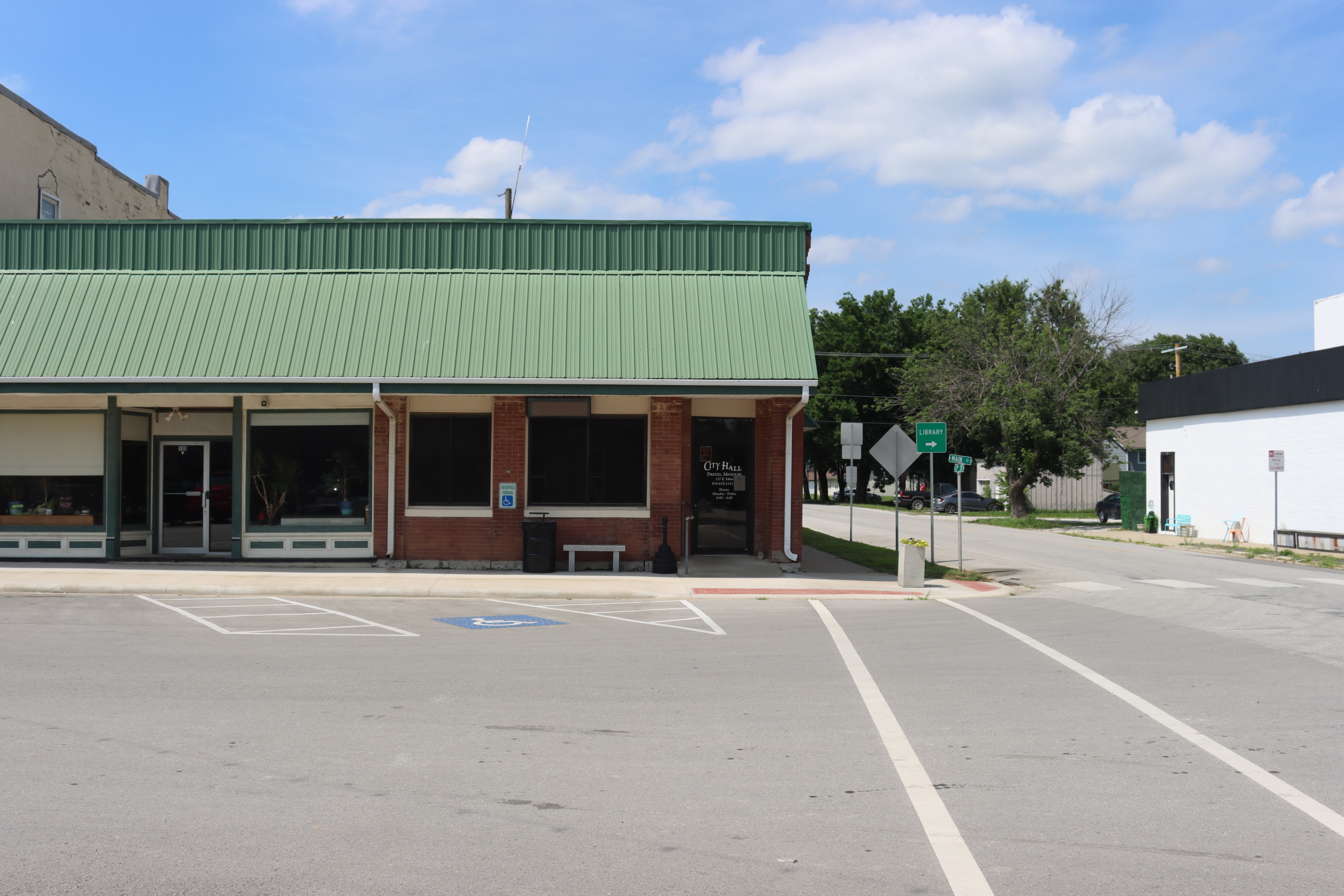
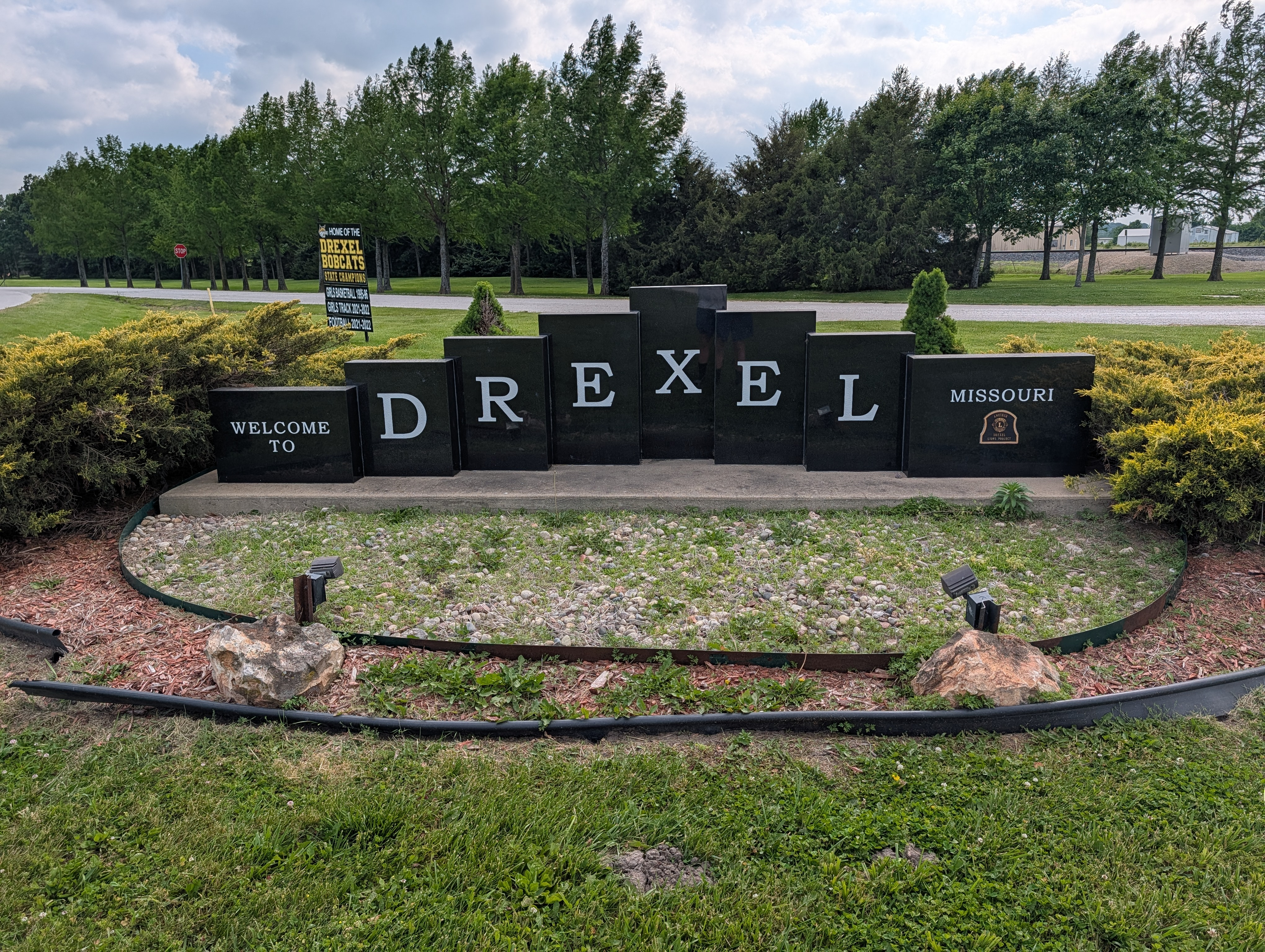
- City Hall A welcome sign north of Drexel

- Location of Drexel, Missouri
- Coordinates: 38°29′14″N 94°36′17″W
- Country: United States
- State: Missouri
- Counties: Cass, Bates

Area
  - Total: 2.76 sq mi (7.15 km^{2})
  - Land: 2.73 sq mi (7.06 km^{2})
  - Water: 0.035 sq mi (0.09 km^{2})
- Elevation: 1,007 ft (307 m)

Population (2020)
  - Total: 968
  - Density: 355.0/sq mi (137.07/km^{2})
- Time zone: UTC-6 (Central (CST))
  - Summer (DST): UTC-5 (CDT)
- ZIP code: 64742
- Area code: 816
- FIPS code: 29-20134
- GNIS feature ID: 2394563

Drexel is a city in northwest Bates and southwest Cass counties in the U.S. state of Missouri. The population was 968 at the 2020 census.

== History ==
Drexel was originally called Stuart City, and under the latter name was platted in 1890. The present name of Drexel was the name of a local store owner. A post office called Drexel has been in operation since 1891.

In June 2010, the Missouri Department of Natural Resources warned of a spike of 31.2 parts herbicide atrazine per billion in Drexel's public water supply. The maximum contaminant level set by the U.S. Environmental Protection Agency for long term exposure is 3 parts per billion. The Missouri Department of Health and Senior Services recommended "neither using the water for drinking nor using it to cook, wash dishes or to make ice."

== Geography ==
Drexel is located in the extreme southwest corner of Cass county and extends into the northwest corner of Bates County. The Missouri-Kansas state line lies adjacent to the west side of the community. Missouri Route A passes through the town as does the old Kansas City Southern Railway line. Archie is 13 miles to the east and Merwin lies five miles to the south.

According to the United States Census Bureau, the city has a total area of 2.77 square miles (7.17 km^{2}), of which 2.73 square miles (7.07 km^{2}) is land and 0.04 square miles (0.10 km^{2}) is water.

== Demographics ==
Historical population
Census	Pop.	Note	%±
1900	453		—
1910	512		13.0%
1920	543		6.1%
1930	553		1.8%
1940	450		−18.6%
1950	456		1.3%
1960	651		42.8%
1970	723		11.1%
1980	908		25.6%
1990	936		3.1%
2000	1,090		16.5%
2010	965		−11.5%
2020	968		0.3%
U.S. Decennial Census

=== Racial and ethnic composition ===
Drexel city, Missouri – Racial and ethnic composition Note: the US Census treats Hispanic/Latino as an ethnic category. This table excludes Latinos from the racial categories and assigns them to a separate category. Hispanics/Latinos may be of any race.
Race / Ethnicity (NH = Non-Hispanic)	Pop 2000	Pop 2010	Pop 2020	% 2000	% 2010	% 2020
White alone (NH)	1,067	933	900	97.89%	96.68%	92.98%
Black or African American alone (NH)	5	9	4	0.46%	0.93%	0.41%
Native American or Alaska Native alone (NH)	5	2	4	0.46%	0.21%	0.41%
Asian alone (NH)	2	1	3	0.18%	0.10%	0.31%
Native Hawaiian or Pacific Islander alone (NH)	0	0	0	0.00%	0.00%	0.00%
Other race alone (NH)	0	0	7	0.00%	0.00%	0.72%
Mixed race or Multiracial (NH)	4	13	29	0.37%	1.35%	3.00%
Hispanic or Latino (any race)	7	7	21	0.64%	0.73%	2.17%
Total	1,090	965	968	100.00%	100.00%	100.00%

=== 2010 census ===
As of the census of 2010, there were 965 people, 404 households, and 264 families living in the city. The population density was 353.5 inhabitants per square mile (136.5/km^{2}). There were 450 housing units at an average density of 164.8 per square mile (63.6/km^{2}). The racial makeup of the city was 97.3% White, 0.9% African American, 0.3% Native American, 0.1% Asian, and 1.3% from two or more races. Hispanic or Latino of any race were 0.7% of the population.

There were 404 households, of which 32.4% had children under the age of 18 living with them, 52.2% were married couples living together, 6.9% had a female householder with no husband present, 6.2% had a male householder with no wife present, and 34.7% were non-families. 31.9% of all households were made up of individuals, and 15.1% had someone living alone who was 65 years of age or older. The average household size was 2.39 and the average family size was 3.00.

The median age in the city was 39.4 years. 26.2% of residents were under the age of 18; 9.2% were between the ages of 18 and 24; 20.5% were from 25 to 44; 25.9% were from 45 to 64; and 18.2% were 65 years of age or older. The gender makeup of the city was 49.6% male and 50.4% female.

=== 2000 census ===
As of the census of 2000, there were 1,090 people, 439 households, and 303 families living in the city. The population density was 1,454.6 inhabitants per square mile (561.6/km^{2}). There were 458 housing units at an average density of 611.2 per square mile (236.0/km^{2}). The racial makeup of the city was 98.44% White, 0.46% African American, 0.46% Native American, 0.18% Asian, 0.09% from other races, and 0.37% from two or more races. Hispanic or Latino of any race were 0.64% of the population.

There were 439 households, out of which 36.4% had children under the age of 18 living with them, 58.5% were married couples living together, 7.7% had a female householder with no husband present, and 30.8% were non-families. 28.7% of all households were made up of individuals, and 14.1% had someone living alone who was 65 years of age or older. The average household size was 2.48 and the average family size was 3.07.

In the city, the population was spread out, with 29.1% under the age of 18, 7.0% from 18 to 24, 28.5% from 25 to 44, 22.0% from 45 to 64, and 13.4% who were 65 years of age or older. The median age was 36 years. For every 100 females, there were 97.1 males. For every 100 females age 18 and over, there were 91.8 males.

The median income for a household in the city was $39,219, and the median income for a family was $44,659. Males had a median income of $37,404 versus $22,404 for females. The per capita income for the city was $17,207. About 4.9% of families and 7.1% of the population were below the poverty line, including 7.5% of those under age 18 and 10.1% of those age 65 or over.

== Education ==
Drexel R-IV School District, which covers all portions of the municipality, operates one elementary school and Drexel High School.

Drexel has a public library, a branch of the Cass County Public Library.

Metropolitan Community College has the Drexel school district area in its service area, but not its in-district taxation area.
