= Osage Township, Dent County, Missouri =

Inactive township in the US state of Missouri

Coordinates: 37.63°N 91.24°W

Osage Township is an inactive township in Dent County, in the U.S. state of Missouri.

Osage Township was established in 1866, taking its name from the Osage people.
