= Quarles, Missouri =

Unincorporated community in Missouri, U.S.

- Interactive map of Quarles, Missouri
- Coordinates: 38°28′15″N 93°45′14″W
- Country: United States
- State: Missouri
- Named after: Benjamin L. Quarles

Quarles is an unincorporated community in Henry County, in the U.S. state of Missouri. The community is located at the intersection of Missouri routes 13 and N, approximately six miles north of Clinton.

== History ==
A post office called Quarles was established in 1886, and remained in operation until 1901. The community has the name of Benjamin L. Quarles, the original owner of the town site.
