= Truman Reservoir =

Lake in Missouri, United States

Harry S. Truman Reservoir
- Truman Lake, Truman Reservoir, Harry S Truman Lake
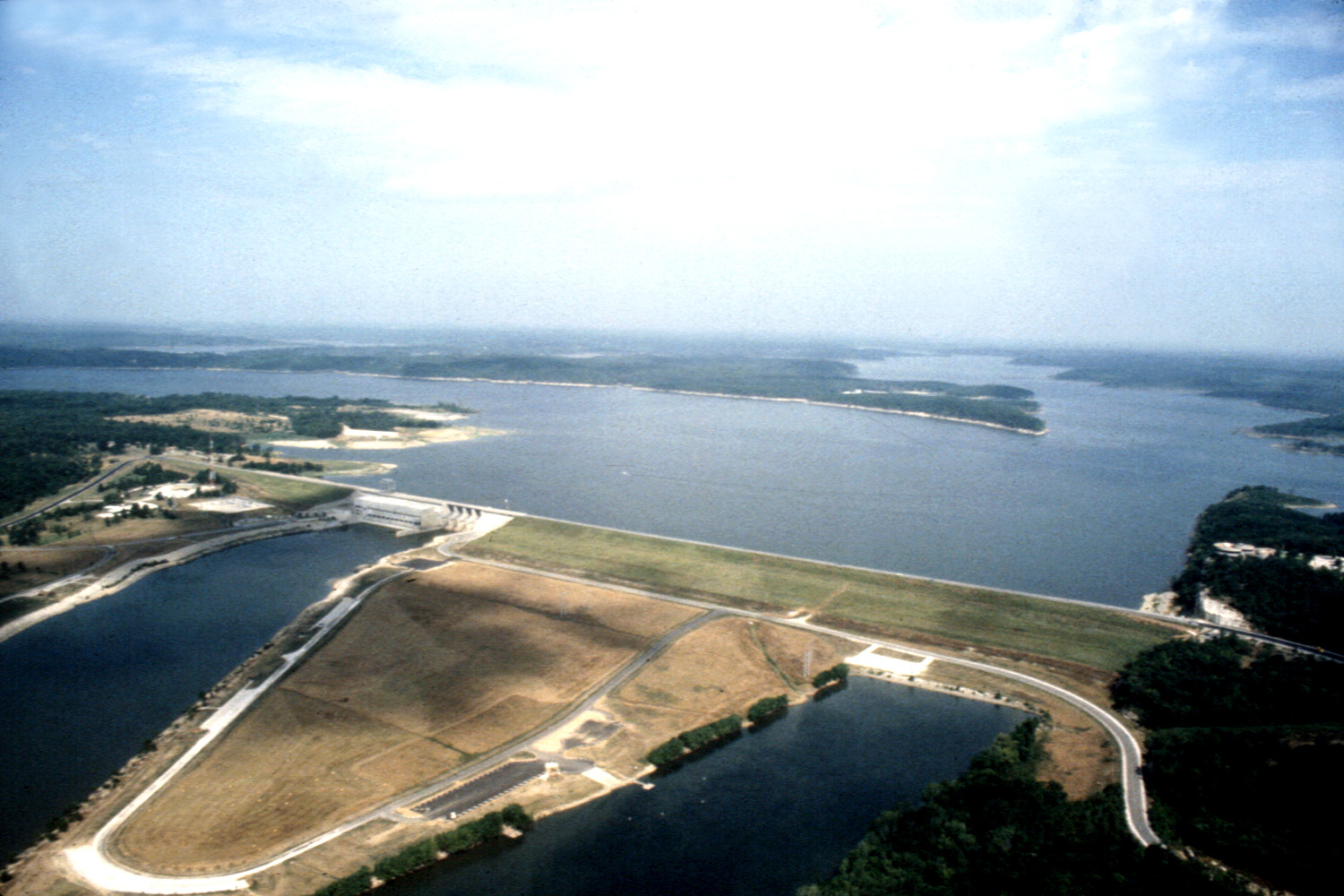
- Harry S. Truman Dam and Reservoir

- Location within Missouri Location within the United States
- Location: Benton, Henry, Hickory, and St. Clair counties, Missouri, U.S.
- Coordinates: 38°15′47″N 93°24′17″W
- Type: Reservoir
- Etymology: U.S. President Harry S. Truman
- Primary inflows: Osage River
- Primary outflows: Osage River
- Basin countries: United States
- Managing agency: U.S. Army Corps of Engineers
- Surface area: 55,600 acres (225 km^{2}), or 200,000 acres (810 km^{2}) at flood stage
- Average depth: 20 feet (6.1 m)
- Max. depth: 80 feet (24 m)
- Water volume: 5,000,000 acre⋅ft (6.2 km^{3})
- Shore length^{1}: 958 miles (1,542 km)
- Surface elevation: 706 feet (215 m) above sea level.
- Settlements: Clinton; Warsaw; Osceola
- ^{1} Shore length is not a well-defined measure.

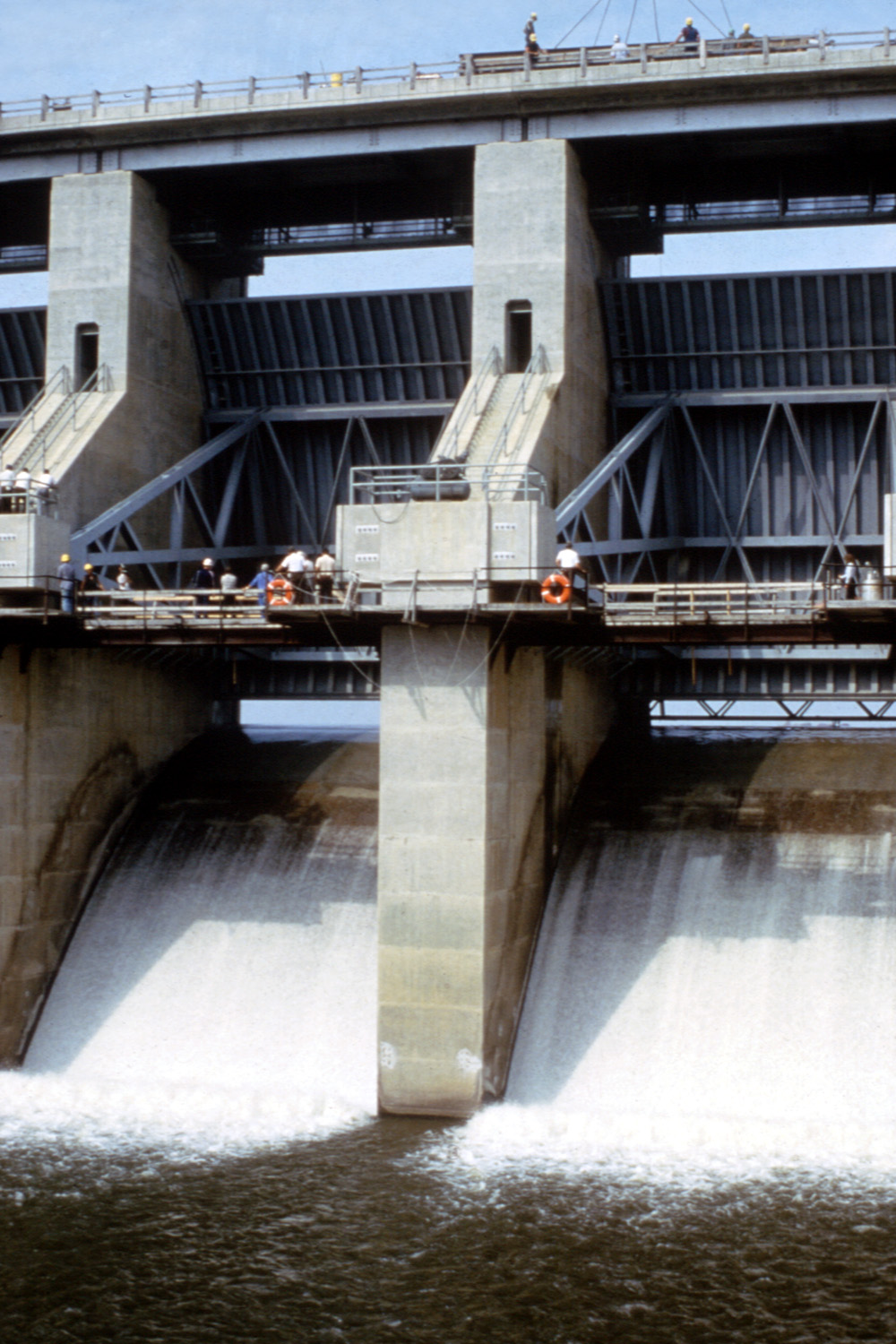
Two of the four large tainter gates at Harry S. Truman Dam

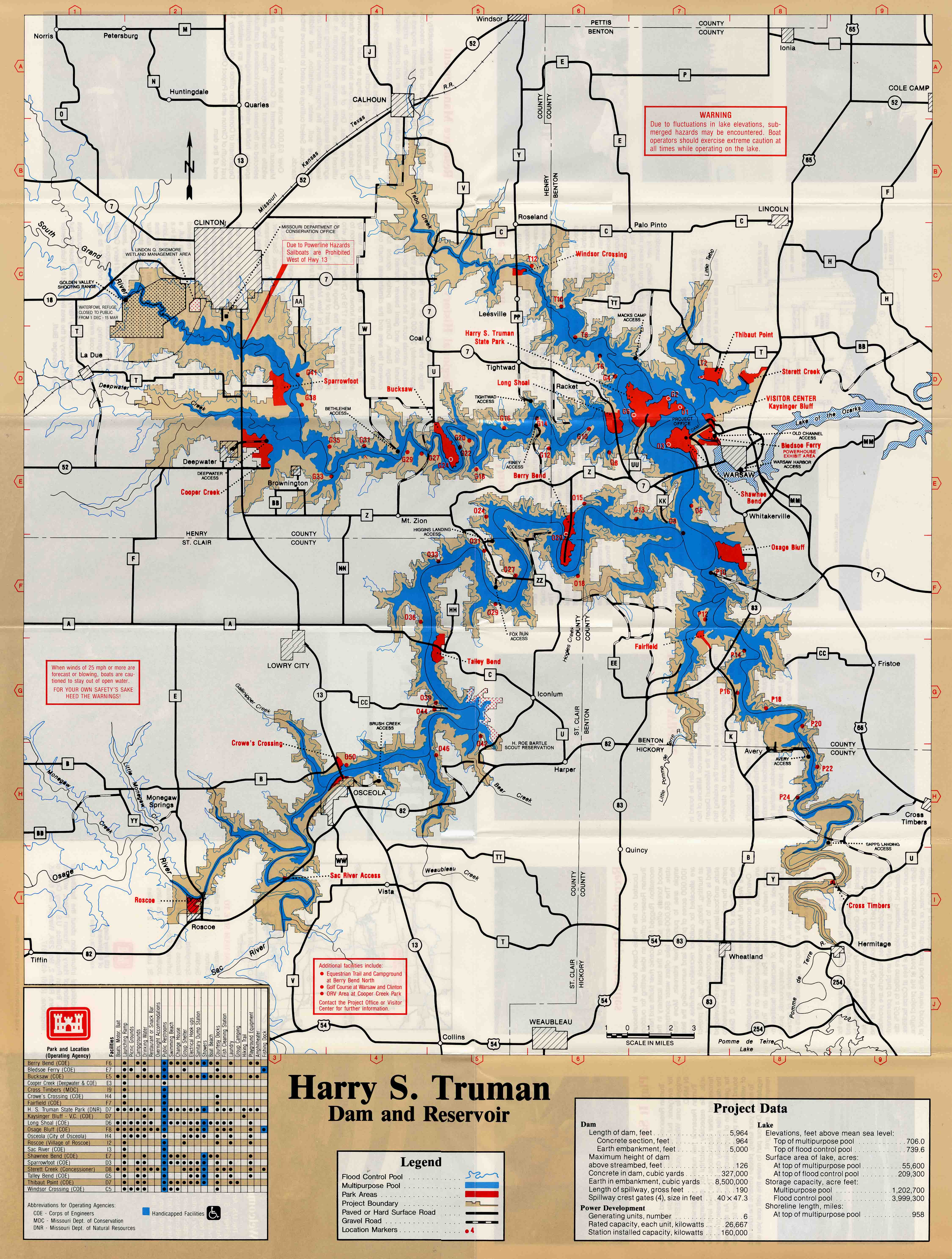
A map and brochure showing the shape and location of the lake

The Harry S. Truman Dam and Reservoir, also known as Truman Lake, is located in the state of Missouri, United States. It is located between Clinton and Warsaw, on the Osage River and extends south to Osceola. The dam is located in Benton County, but the reservoir also extends into parts of Henry, St. Clair, and Hickory counties.

== History ==
The U.S. Army Corps of Engineers built and manages the lake and dam. It is used primarily for flood control. Other uses include power generation, recreation, and wildlife management.

Originally named Kaysinger Bluff Dam and Reservoir in 1954, when construction was authorized, construction began in August 1964. It was renamed the Harry S. Truman Dam and Reservoir, in honor of the former president from Missouri, by Congress in 1970. Construction was completed in 1979. The Kaysinger name refers to the bluff immediately north next to where the dam was eventually constructed. The bluff or cliff, a popular landmark even before the dam, overlooked the confluence of the South Grand River, Tebo Creek and the Osage River. The visitor center now sits on the bluff.

Completing the Truman Project took many years of planning, land acquisition, constructing new bridges and demolishing old ones. Several roads, towns, and cemeteries had to be relocated. The first construction project completed on the project was relocating Route 13 so it would be above maximum pool level.

The creation of the lake forced the closure of the Frisco Railroad's "Highline". Rising water levels severed the railroad tracks near Osceola and Deepwater and railroad officials declined to spend millions of dollars to reroute the lightly used tracks. The Missouri-Kansas-Texas Railroad, however, did relocate its main line between La Due and Clinton; the project included five miles of new track and a causeway/bridge combination over the lake.

== Harry S Truman Regional Visitor Center ==
The Harry S. Truman Visitor Center contains exhibits about the cultural and natural history of Truman Lake, environmental activities, the construction of the dam, the operation of the powerhouse, and the US Army Corps of Engineers. A 67-seat theater shows wildlife, history and water safety videos by request. The observation deck offers views of Truman Lake and part of the Lake of the Ozarks, as well as the dam.

== Harry S Truman State Park ==
Harry S Truman State Park is located in Benton County, Missouri on a peninsula that juts out into the reservoir.

== Weaubleau-Osceola structure ==
The south-west portion of the lake makes up part of the circumference of the Weaubleau-Osceola structure, a 330-335 million year old impact crater.

== Harry S. Truman Dam ==
Dam type:	Concrete gravity and earth embankment in two sections
Length (total):	5,964 feet (1,817.8 m)
Length (concrete section):	964 feet (293.8 m)
Length (earth section):	5,000 feet (1,524.0 m)
Height above river bed:	126 feet (38.4 m)
Concrete volume:	327,000 yd^{3} (250,011 m^{3})
Earth volume:	8,500,000 yd^{3} (6,498,755 m^{3})
Spillway length:	190 feet (57.9 m) in four sections
Tainter gates:	4
Six turbines	Rated at 160 megawatts
