= Osage River =

River in Missouri, United States

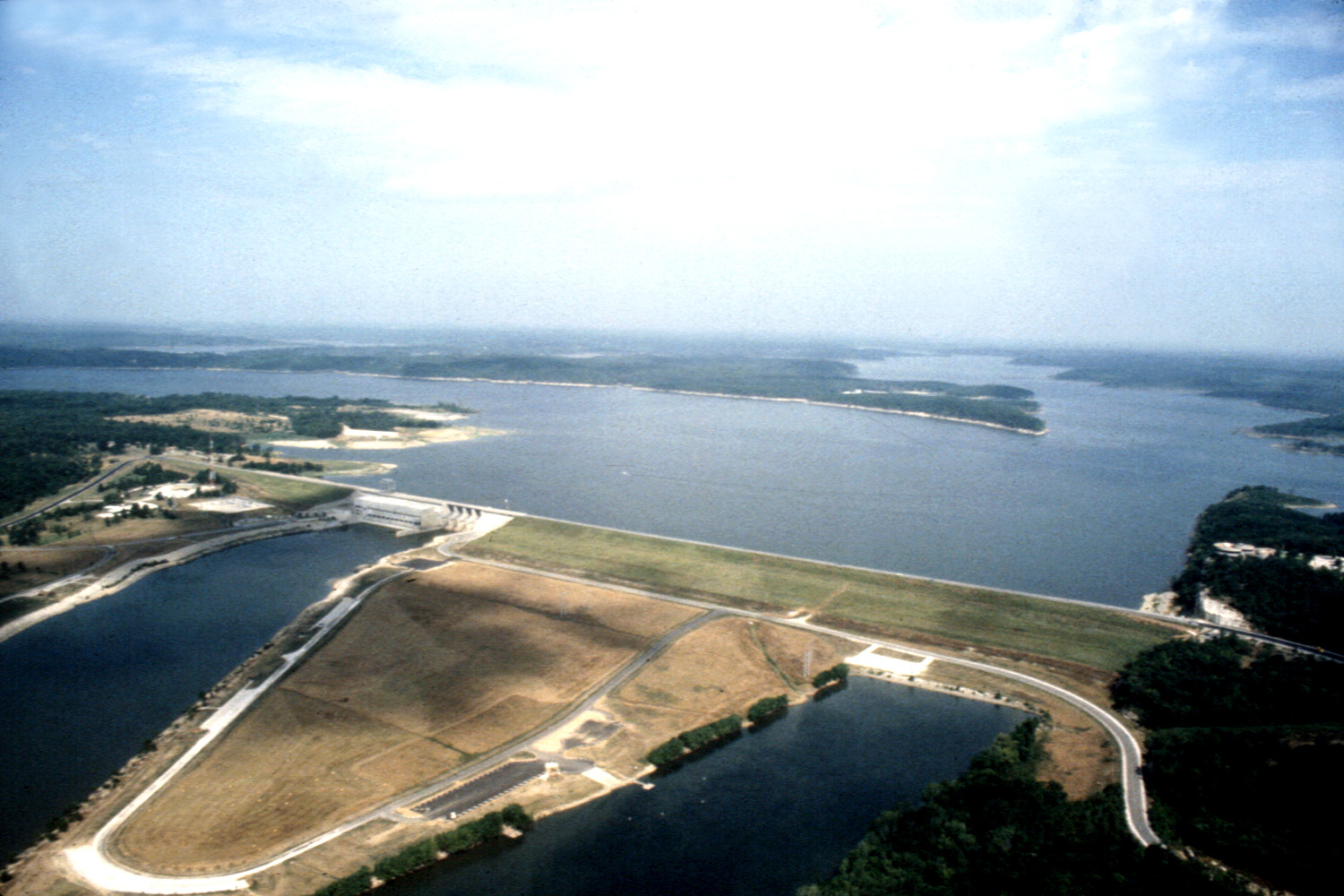

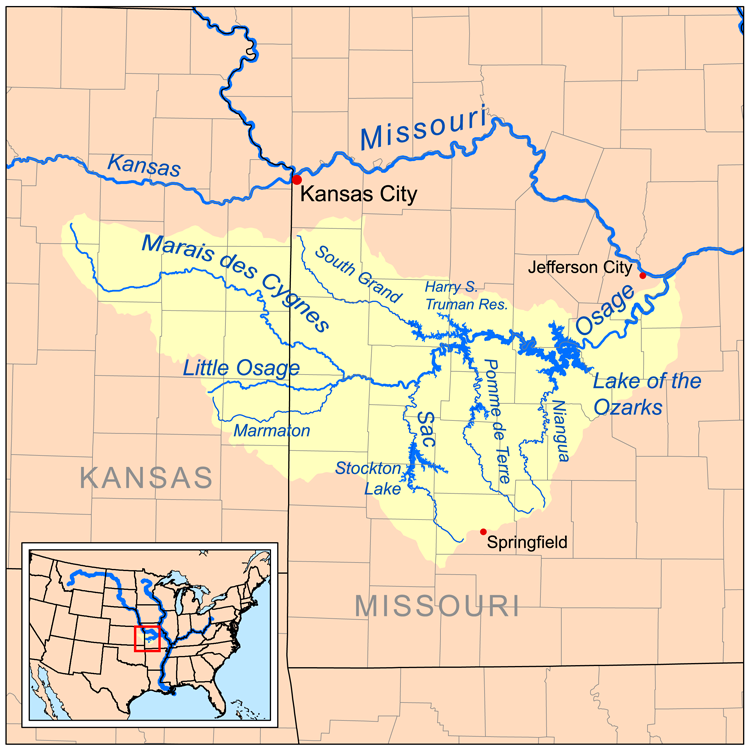
- Map of the Osage River watershed

Location
- Country: United States
- State: Missouri; Kansas
- Region: Osage Plains, Ozarks
- City: Warsaw, Lake Ozark, Tuscumbia, St. Thomas

Physical characteristics
- Source confluence
  - location: Vernon County, Missouri
  - coordinates: 38°01′39″N 94°14′39″W
  - elevation: 722 ft (220 m)
- Mouth: Missouri River
  - location: Bonnots Mill, Missouri
  - coordinates: 38°35′49″N 91°56′43″W
  - elevation: 518 ft (158 m)
- Length: 276 mi (444 km)
- Basin size: 15,300 sq mi (40,000 km^{2})
- Discharge
  - location: near St. Thomas, MO
  - average: 10,879 cu ft/s (308.1 m^{3}/s)
  - minimum: 640 cu ft/s (18 m^{3}/s)
  - maximum: 216,000 cu ft/s (6,100 m^{3}/s)

Basin features
- Tributaries
  - left: Marais des Cygnes River, South Grand River
  - right: Little Osage River, Ladies Branch, Miller Branch, Clear Creek, Sac River, Pomme de Terre River, Niangua River
- Watersheds: Osage-Missouri-Mississippi

The Osage River (/ˈoʊseɪdʒ/ OH-sayj) is a 276-mile-long (444 km) tributary of the Missouri River in central Missouri in the United States. The eighth-largest river in the state, it drains a mostly rural area of 15,300 square miles (40,000 km^{2}). The watershed includes an area of east-central Kansas and a large portion of west-central and central Missouri, where it drains northwest areas of the Ozark Plateau.

The river flows generally easterly, then northeasterly for the final 80 miles (130 km) where it joins the Missouri River. It is impounded in two major locations. Most of the river has been converted into a chain of two reservoirs, the Harry S. Truman Reservoir and the Lake of the Ozarks.

== Description ==
The Osage is formed in southwestern Missouri, approximately 14 miles (23 km) northeast of Nevada on the Bates–Vernon County line, by the confluence of the Marais des Cygnes and Little Osage Rivers; the Marais des Cygnes is sometimes counted as part of the river, placing its headwaters in eastern Kansas and bringing its total length to over 500 miles (800 km). The combined stream flows east past the Schell-Osage Wildlife Area into St. Clair County, widening into a long meandering arm of the Harry S. Truman Reservoir, approximately 40 miles (64 km) long. The lake receives the South Grand River as a second arm of the reservoir from the northwest, as well as the Pomme de Terre River from the south. The two arms of the reservoir join near the Harry S. Truman Dam in central Benton County.

Downstream from the Truman Dam, the river becomes the serpentine Lake of the Ozarks, stretching eastward for nearly 92 miles (148 km) to Bagnell Dam in Camden County and southwestern Miller County. Constructed in 1931, the dam collects the Niangua River. Downstream from the dam, the Osage flows freely for around 80 miles to the northeast in broad oxbow meanders through forested bluffs, joining the Missouri approximately 15 miles (24 km) east and downstream of Jefferson City.

== History ==
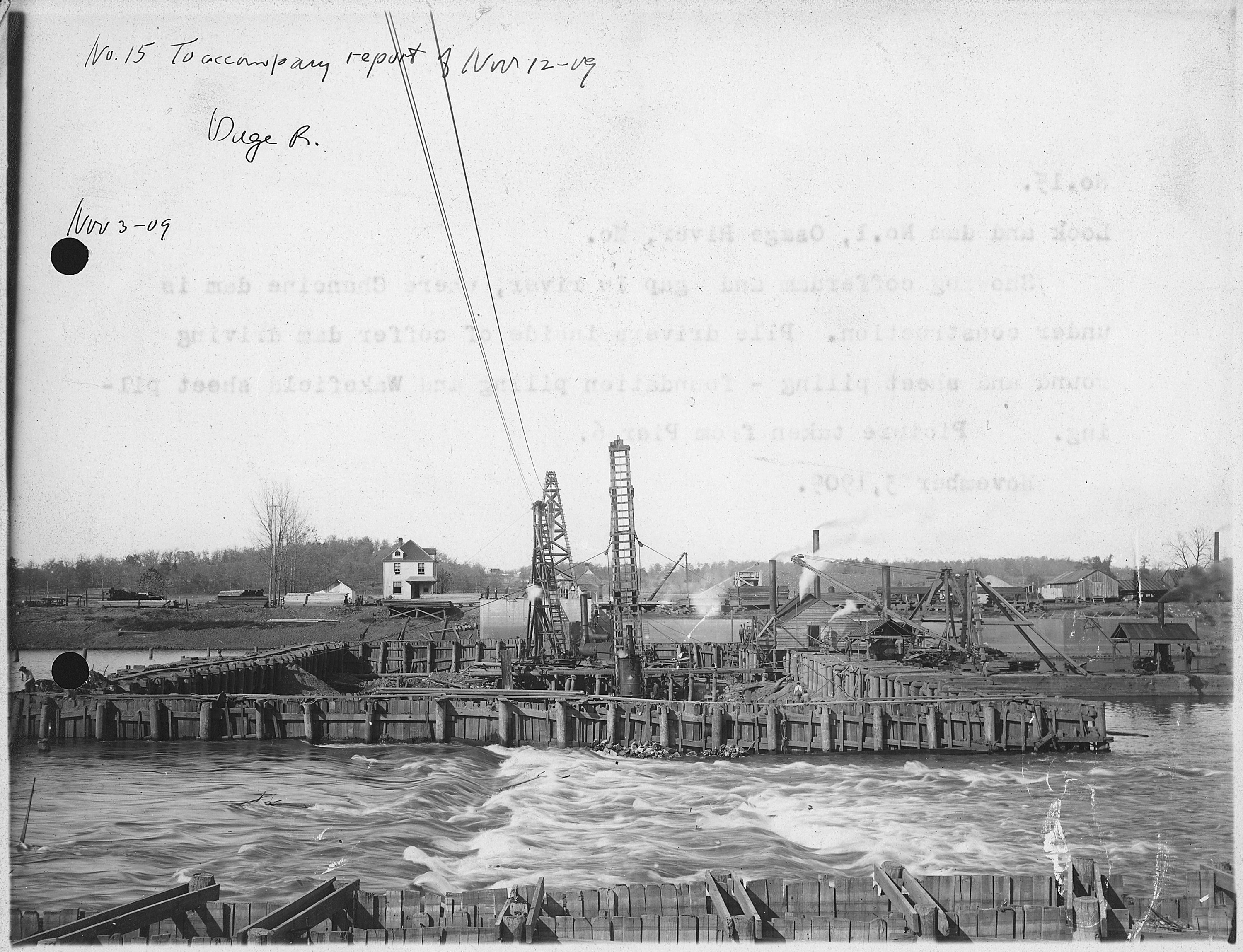
Views of cofferdam, where new Chanoine Dam is under construction, November 3, 1909

The river is named from the French "eau sage", for the Osage Nation, the historic indigenous people who dominated this region at the time when the first European settlers arrived. The river presented significant navigation difficulties for early settlers because of its fluctuating water levels, as well as the presence of shallow pools and sand bars caused by its tight meandering course through the hills.

The Missouri Legislature attempted as early as 1839 to deepen the channel of the river. Early attempts failed because of lack of funding for the immense task. Commercial navigation on the river in the 19th century was confined mostly to smaller craft that could navigate the tight bends and shoals of the river. Improvements in the channel by the last two decades of the century led to greater commercial traffic. These changes made the lower reaches of the river navigable for steamboat commerce for a period of six to nine months out of the year.

=== Transportation ===
Prior to the construction of the Bagnell Dam, the main method of crossing the river was the Bagnell Ferry, which began operation in 1882, speared by Samuel Umpsted as the contractor. Several ferry accidents, including sinking, resulted in the deaths of several customers. The ferry declined in operation towards 1940, years after the dam had finished.

=== Hydroelectricity ===
In the 20th century, private construction of the Bagnell Dam, primarily to generate hydroelectricity, began in 1922 and was completed after nine years. It effectively ended commercial navigation on the river. The federally constructed Truman Dam was authorized by the federal Flood Control Act of 1954 and was completed in 1979.

The two dams on the river generate power for the St. Louis metropolitan area. The large reservoirs have become popular tourist destinations and recreation areas in the region.

== See also ==
- List of Kansas rivers
- List of Missouri rivers
- Cadet Creek
