= Henry County, Missouri =

County in Missouri, United States

- County
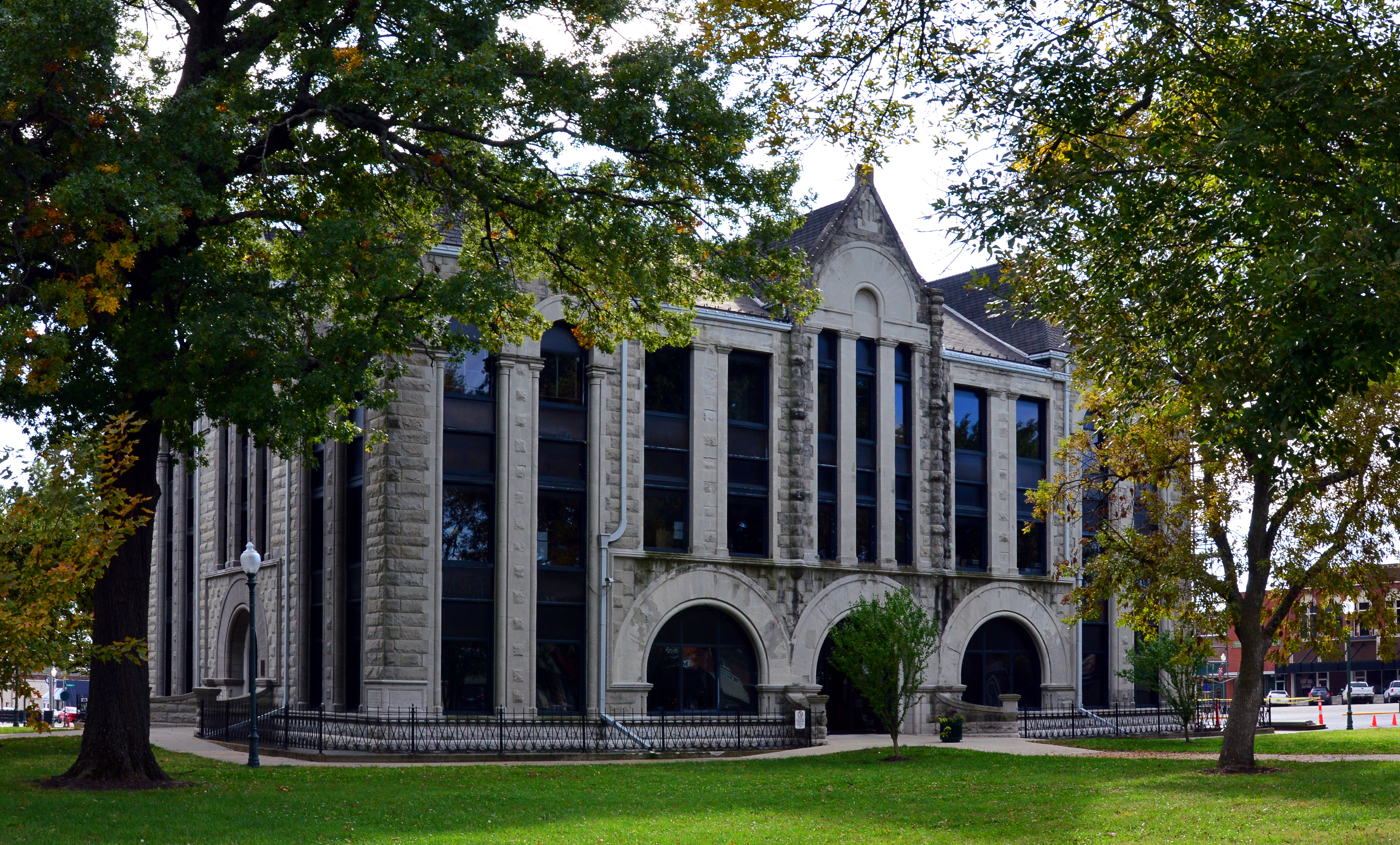
- Henry County Courthouse in Clinton

- Location within the U.S. state of Missouri
- Coordinates: 38°23′N 93°47′W
- Country: United States
- State: Missouri
- Founded: December 13, 1834
- Named for: Patrick Henry
- Seat: Clinton
- Largest city: Clinton

Area
  - Total: 732 sq mi (1,900 km^{2})
  - Land: 697 sq mi (1,810 km^{2})
  - Water: 35 sq mi (91 km^{2}) 4.8%

Population (2020)
  - Total: 21,946
  - Estimate (2025): 22,671 ▲
  - Density: 31.5/sq mi (12.2/km^{2})
- Time zone: UTC−6 (Central)
  - Summer (DST): UTC−5 (CDT)
- Congressional district: 4th
- Website: www.henrycomo.com

Henry County is a county located in the western portion of the U.S. state of Missouri. As of the 2020 census, the population was 21,946. Its county seat is Clinton. The county was organized December 13, 1834, as Rives County but was renamed in 1841 for Revolutionary War patriot Patrick Henry. The county originally had been named after William Cabell Rives, who was then serving as a U.S. Senator from Virginia. However, Rives lost popularity in Missouri after he joined the Whig Party.

== Geography ==
According to the U.S. Census Bureau, the county has a total area of 732 square miles (1,900 km^{2}), of which 697 square miles (1,810 km^{2}) is land and 35 square miles (91 km^{2}) (4.8%) is water.

=== Adjacent counties ===
- Johnson County (north)
- Pettis County (northeast)
- Benton County (east)
- St. Clair County (south)
- Bates County (west)
- Cass County (northwest)

=== Major highways ===
- Route 7
- Route 13
- Route 18
- Route 52

=== Transit ===
- Jefferson Lines

== Demographics ==
Historical population
Census	Pop.	Note	%±
1840	4,726		—
1850	4,052		−14.3%
1860	9,866		143.5%
1870	17,401		76.4%
1880	23,906		37.4%
1890	28,235		18.1%
1900	28,054		−0.6%
1910	27,242		−2.9%
1920	25,116		−7.8%
1930	22,931		−8.7%
1940	22,313		−2.7%
1950	20,043		−10.2%
1960	19,226		−4.1%
1970	18,451		−4.0%
1980	19,672		6.6%
1990	20,044		1.9%
2000	21,997		9.7%
2010	22,272		1.3%
2020	21,946		−1.5%
2025 (est.)	22,671	▲	3.3%
U.S. Decennial Census; 1790-1960 1900-1990; 1990-2000 2010

=== 2020 census ===
As of the 2020 census, the county had a population of 21,946. The median age was 44.7 years. 22.1% of residents were under the age of 18 and 22.9% of residents were 65 years of age or older. For every 100 females there were 96.0 males, and for every 100 females age 18 and over there were 93.8 males age 18 and over.

The racial makeup of the county was 91.2% White, 0.9% Black or African American, 0.5% American Indian and Alaska Native, 0.4% Asian, 0.0% Native Hawaiian and Pacific Islander, 0.9% from some other race, and 6.1% from two or more races. Hispanic or Latino residents of any race comprised 2.6% of the population.

40.4% of residents lived in urban areas, while 59.6% lived in rural areas.

There were 9,253 households in the county, of which 26.4% had children under the age of 18 living with them and 26.6% had a female householder with no spouse or partner present. About 31.7% of all households were made up of individuals and 15.4% had someone living alone who was 65 years of age or older.

There were 10,693 housing units, of which 13.5% were vacant. Among occupied housing units, 70.2% were owner-occupied and 29.8% were renter-occupied. The homeowner vacancy rate was 2.2% and the rental vacancy rate was 8.5%.

=== 2000 census ===
As of the census of 2000, there were 21,997 people, 9,133 households, and 6,246 families residing in the county. The population density was 31 people per square mile (12 people/km^{2}). There were 10,261 housing units at an average density of 15 units per square mile (5.8/km^{2}). The racial makeup of the county was 96.61% White, 1.02% Black or African American, 0.70% Native American, 0.25% Asian, 0.02% Pacific Islander, 0.34% from other races, and 1.05% from two or more races. Approximately 0.91% of the population were Hispanic or Latino of any race.

There were 9,133 households, out of which 28.40% had children under the age of 18 living with them, 55.30% were married couples living together, 9.30% had a female householder with no husband present, and 31.60% were non-families. 27.70% of all households were made up of individuals, and 13.30% had someone living alone who was 65 years of age or older. The average household size was 2.37 and the average family size was 2.86.

In the county, the population was spread out, with 23.70% under the age of 18, 7.80% from 18 to 24, 25.80% from 25 to 44, 24.40% from 45 to 64, and 18.30% who were 65 years of age or older. The median age was 40 years. For every 100 females there were 95.50 males. For every 100 females age 18 and over, there were 91.30 males.

The median income for a household in the county was $30,949, and the median income for a family was $36,328. Males had a median income of $27,932 versus $19,201 for females. The per capita income for the county was $16,468. About 11.40% of families and 14.30% of the population were below the poverty line, including 19.40% of those under age 18 and 13.90% of those age 65 or over.

=== Racial and ethnic composition ===
Henry County, Missouri – Racial and ethnic composition Note: the US Census treats Hispanic/Latino as an ethnic category. This table excludes Latinos from the racial categories and assigns them to a separate category. Hispanics/Latinos may be of any race.
Race / Ethnicity (NH = Non-Hispanic)	Pop 1980	Pop 1990	Pop 2000	Pop 2010	Pop 2020	% 1980	% 1990	% 2000	% 2010	% 2020
White alone (NH)	19,267	19,545	21,157	21,230	19,800	97.94%	97.51%	96.18%	95.32%	90.22%
Black or African American alone (NH)	227	227	212	219	177	1.15%	1.13%	0.96%	0.98%	0.81%
Native American or Alaska Native alone (NH)	57	81	150	101	89	0.29%	0.40%	0.68%	0.45%	0.41%
Asian alone (NH)	16	46	50	52	91	0.08%	0.23%	0.23%	0.23%	0.41%
Native Hawaiian or Pacific Islander alone (NH)	x	x	5	13	6	x	x	0.02%	0.06%	0.03%
Other race alone (NH)	12	1	9	8	67	0.06%	0.00%	0.04%	0.04%	0.31%
Mixed race or Multiracial (NH)	x	x	213	280	1,143	x	x	0.97%	1.26%	5.21%
Hispanic or Latino (any race)	93	144	201	369	573	0.47%	0.72%	0.91%	1.66%	2.61%
Total	19,672	20,044	21,997	22,272	21,946	100.00%	100.00%	100.00%	100.00%	100.00%

== Education ==
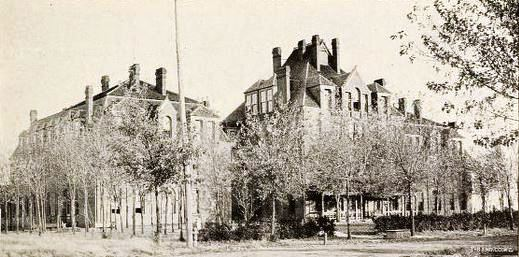
Historic photo of Baird College in Clinton

=== Public schools ===
- Calhoun R-VIII School District– Calhoun
  - Calhoun Elementary School (K-06)
  - Calhoun High School (07–12)
- Clinton School District – Clinton
  - Clinton Early Childhood Center (PK)
  - Henry Elementary School (K-02)
  - Clinton Intermediate School (03–05)
  - Clinton Middle School (06–08)
  - Clinton High School (09–12)
- Davis R-XII School District – Clinton
  - Davis Elementary School (K-08)
- Henry County R-1 School District – Windsor
  - Windsor Elementary School (PK-06)
  - Windsor High School (07–12)
- Lakeland R-III School District – Deepwater/Lowry City
  - Actually located in St. Clair County
  - Lakeland Elementary School (PK-06)
  - Lakeland High School (07–12)
- Leesville R-IX School District – Clinton
  - Leesville Elementary School (K-08)
- Montrose R-XIV School District – Montrose
  - Montrose Elementary School (K-08)
  - Montrose High School (09–12)
- Shawnee R-III School District – Chilhowee
  - Shawnee Elementary School (K-08)

=== Private schools ===
- Windsor Amish Schools – Windsor (01–08) – Amish
- St. Mary's School – Montrose (01–08) – Roman Catholic
- Holy Rosary Catholic School – Clinton (PK-08) – Roman Catholic
- Clinton Christian Academy – Clinton (K4-12) – Nondenominational Christian

=== Public libraries ===
- Henry County Library
- Lenora Blackmore Branch of Henry County Library

== Politics ==
=== Local ===
The Democratic Party historically controls politics at the local level in Henry County. However, recent gains by Republicans have made Henry County a decidedly Republican stronghold, holding almost all positions in the county.

Henry County, Missouri

Elected countywide officials
Assessor	Scott Largent	Republican
Circuit Clerk	Wendi McGhee	Republican
County Clerk	Rick Watson	Republican
Collector	Ann Julian	Republican
Commissioner (presiding)	Jim Stone	Republican
Commissioner (district 1)	Rick Fosnow	Republican
Commissioner (district 2)	Dale Lawler	Republican
Coroner	Dain Sisk	Republican
Prosecuting Attorney	LaChrisha Gray	Republican
Public Administrator	Allen Huff	Republican
Recorder	Gail Perrymann	Republican
Sheriff	J. Kent Oberkrom	Republican
Surveyor	Jacob Hann	Democratic
Treasurer	Ann Julian	Republican

=== State ===
Past Gubernatorial Elections Results
Year	Republican	Democratic	Third Parties
2024	74.17% 7,957	23.56% 2,527	2.28% 244
2020	74.00% 7,928	24.02% 2,574	1.98% 212
2016	59.40% 5,582	37.51% 3,695	3.09% 304
2012	42.14% 4,277	53.85% 5,430	3.74% 377
2008	35.70% 3,935	61.79% 6,810	2.51% 277
2004	50.47% 5,471	48.29% 5,235	1.23% 134
2000	45.63% 4,420	52.36% 5,072	2.01% 194
1996	34.41% 3,135	62.70% 5,712	2.89% 263

All of Henry County is a part of Missouri's 57th District in the Missouri House of Representatives and is represented by Rodger Reedy (R-Windsor), who was elected in 2018.

Missouri House of Representatives — District 57 — Henry County (2016)
Party	Candidate	Votes	%	±%
Republican	Wanda Brown	6,237	64.30%	+1.92
Democratic	William A. Grimes	3,463	35.70%	+2.03

Missouri House of Representatives — District 57 — Henry County (2014)
Party	Candidate	Votes	%	±%
Republican	Wanda Brown	3,348	62.38%	+10.58
Democratic	William A. Grimes	1,807	33.67%	−14.53
Constitution	Butch Page	212	3.95%	+3.95

Missouri House of Representatives — District 57 — Henry County (2012)
Party	Candidate	Votes	%	±%
Republican	Wanda Brown	5,012	51.80%	
Democratic	Don Bullock	4,664	48.20%	

All of Henry County is a part of Missouri's 31st District in the Missouri Senate and is currently represented by Ed Emery (R-Lamar).

Missouri Senate — District 31 — Henry County (2016)
Party	Candidate	Votes	%	±%
Republican	Ed Emery	6,916	73.97%	+14.28
Libertarian	Lora Young	1,132	12.11%	+12.11
Independent	Tim Wells	1,302	13.92%	+13.92

Missouri Senate — District 31 — Henry County (2012)
Party	Candidate	Votes	%	±%
Republican	Ed Emery	5,812	59.69%	
Constitution	Charles A. Burton	3,925	40.31%	

=== Federal ===
U.S. Senate — Missouri — Henry County (2016)
Party	Candidate	Votes	%	±%
Republican	Roy Blunt	5,500	55.82%	+15.28
Democratic	Jason Kander	3,785	38.41%	−12.63
Libertarian	Jonathan Dine	310	3.15%	−5.27
Green	Johnathan McFarland	144	1.46%	+1.46
Constitution	Fred Ryman	114	1.16%	+1.16

U.S. Senate — Missouri — Henry County (2012)
Party	Candidate	Votes	%	±%
Republican	Todd Akin	4,066	40.54%	
Democratic	Claire McCaskill	5,119	51.04%	
Libertarian	Jonathan Dine	844	8.42%	

All of Henry County is included in Missouri's 4th Congressional District and is currently represented by Vicky Hartzler (R-Harrisonville) in the U.S. House of Representatives.

U.S. House of Representatives — Missouri's 4th Congressional District — Henry County (2016)
Party	Candidate	Votes	%	±%
Republican	Vicky Hartzler	6,927	71.30%	+3.40
Democratic	Gordon Christensen	2,399	24.69%	−2.47
Libertarian	Mark Bliss	389	4.00%	−0.94

U.S. House of Representatives — Missouri's 4th Congressional District — Henry County (2014)
Party	Candidate	Votes	%	±%
Republican	Vicky Hartzler	3,630	67.90%	+7.82
Democratic	Nate Irvin	1,452	27.16%	−8.39
Libertarian	Herschel L. Young	264	4.94%	+1.77

U.S. House of Representatives — Missouri’s 4th Congressional District — Henry County (2012)
Party	Candidate	Votes	%	±%
Republican	Vicky Hartzler	5,970	60.08%	
Democratic	Teresa Hensley	3,532	35.55%	
Libertarian	Thomas Holbrook	315	3.17%	
Constitution	Greg Cowan	119	1.20%	

=== Political culture ===
United States presidential election results for Henry County, Missouri
Year	Republican		Democratic		Third party(ies)	
Year	No.	%	No.	%	No.	%
1888	2,634	42.44%	3,289	52.99%	284	4.58%
1892	2,563	39.19%	3,475	53.13%	502	7.68%
1896	3,234	41.79%	4,442	57.41%	62	0.80%
1900	2,626	39.49%	3,777	56.81%	246	3.70%
1904	2,799	44.49%	3,222	51.22%	270	4.29%
1908	2,854	43.30%	3,577	54.27%	160	2.43%
1912	1,162	18.40%	3,396	53.78%	1,757	27.82%
1916	2,727	41.90%	3,653	56.12%	129	1.98%
1920	5,313	49.14%	5,367	49.63%	133	1.23%
1924	4,616	46.76%	4,706	47.68%	549	5.56%
1928	6,263	59.07%	4,319	40.73%	21	0.20%
1932	3,631	34.58%	6,809	64.85%	60	0.57%
1936	4,927	40.68%	7,145	59.00%	39	0.32%
1940	6,332	50.97%	6,069	48.85%	22	0.18%
1944	5,564	54.69%	4,587	45.09%	23	0.23%
1948	4,619	45.40%	5,551	54.56%	4	0.04%
1952	6,628	59.07%	4,576	40.78%	16	0.14%
1956	5,789	54.16%	4,900	45.84%	0	0.00%
1960	6,012	56.65%	4,601	43.35%	0	0.00%
1964	3,083	34.86%	5,761	65.14%	0	0.00%
1968	3,824	47.68%	3,514	43.82%	682	8.50%
1972	5,802	64.99%	3,125	35.01%	0	0.00%
1976	4,168	43.89%	5,282	55.62%	47	0.49%
1980	4,807	49.19%	4,648	47.56%	317	3.24%
1984	5,419	59.16%	3,741	40.84%	0	0.00%
1988	4,167	50.04%	4,135	49.65%	26	0.31%
1992	2,681	27.53%	4,232	43.45%	2,827	29.02%
1996	3,260	35.68%	4,579	50.11%	1,298	14.21%
2000	5,120	52.36%	4,459	45.60%	199	2.04%
2004	6,361	58.48%	4,461	41.01%	55	0.51%
2008	6,095	54.62%	4,869	43.63%	195	1.75%
2012	6,229	61.18%	3,606	35.42%	347	3.41%
2016	7,075	71.38%	2,357	23.78%	480	4.84%
2020	8,027	74.41%	2,619	24.28%	142	1.32%
2024	8,286	75.80%	2,535	23.19%	111	1.02%

== Communities ==
=== Cities ===
- Blairstown
- Brownington
- Calhoun
- Clinton (county seat)
- Deepwater
- Montrose
- Urich
- Windsor

=== Villages ===
- La Due
- Tightwad

=== Census-designated place ===
- Hartwell

=== Unincorporated communities ===
- Bowen
- Coal
- Finey
- Garland
- Germantown
- Huntingdale
- Leesville
- Lewis
- Lucas
- Maurine
- Mount Zion
- Petersburg
- Piper
- Quarles
- Roseland
- Shawnee Mound

=== Townships ===
- Bear Creek
- Bethlehem
- Big Creek
- Bogard
- Clinton
- Davis
- Deepwater
- Deer Creek
- Fairview
- Fields Creek
- Honey Creek
- Leesville
- Osage
- Shawnee
- Springfield
- Tebo
- Walker
- White Oak
- Windsor

== See also ==
- National Register of Historic Places listings in Henry County, Missouri
