= Mingo Township, Bates County, Missouri =

Township in the US state of Missouri

Mingo Township
- Township
- Location in Bates County
- Coordinates: 38°25′08″N 94°07′06″W
- Country: United States
- State: Missouri
- County: Bates

Area
  - Total: 25.86 sq mi (66.99 km^{2})
  - Land: 25.82 sq mi (66.87 km^{2})
  - Water: 0.046 sq mi (0.12 km^{2}) 0.18%
- Elevation: 866 ft (264 m)

Population (2000)
  - Total: 235
  - Density: 9.1/sq mi (3.5/km^{2})
- Time zone: UTC-6 (CST)
  - Summer (DST): UTC-5 (CDT)
- ZIP codes: 64720, 64747, 64788
- GNIS feature ID: 0766299

Mingo Township is one of twenty-four townships in Bates County, Missouri, and is part of the Kansas City metropolitan area within the USA. As of the 2000 census, its population was 235.

The township takes its name from Mingo Creek.

== Geography ==
According to the United States Census Bureau, Mingo Township covers an area of 25.86 square miles (66.99 square kilometres); of this, 25.82 square miles (66.87 square kilometres, 99.82 percent) is land and 0.04 square miles (0.12 square kilometres, 0.18 percent) is water.

=== Unincorporated towns ===
- Mayesburg at 38.402519°N 94.086054°W

(This list is based on USGS data and may include former settlements.)

=== Adjacent townships ===
- Sherman Township, Cass County (north)
- White Oak Township, Henry County (east)
- Walker Township, Henry County (southeast)
- Spruce Township (south)
- Shawnee Township (southwest)
- Grand River Township (west)
- Dayton Township, Cass County (northwest)

=== Cemeteries ===
The township contains these four cemeteries: Cove Creek, Earheart, Gragg and Peter Creek.

=== Rivers ===
- South Grand River

=== Lakes ===
- Clear Lake
- Sprig Lake

== School districts ==
- Adrian R-III School District
- Ballard R-II

== Political districts ==
- Missouri's 4th congressional district
- State House District 120
- State Senate District 31
