= Deer Creek Township, Bates County, Missouri =

Township in the US state of Missouri

Deer Creek Township
- Township
- Location in Bates County
- Coordinates: 38°24′16″N 94°20′49″W
- Country: United States
- State: Missouri
- County: Bates

Area
  - Total: 31.71 sq mi (82.12 km^{2})
  - Land: 31.67 sq mi (82.03 km^{2})
  - Water: 0.031 sq mi (0.08 km^{2}) 0.1%
- Elevation: 846 ft (258 m)

Population (2000)
  - Total: 2,162
  - Density: 68/sq mi (26.4/km^{2})
- Time zone: UTC-6 (CST)
  - Summer (DST): UTC-5 (CDT)
- ZIP codes: 64720, 64725
- GNIS feature ID: 0766291

Deer Creek Township is one of twenty-four townships in Bates County, Missouri, and is part of the Kansas City metropolitan area within the USA. As of the 2000 census, its population was 2,162.

The township was named for a nearby creek of the same name where deer were abundant.

== Geography ==
According to the United States Census Bureau, Deer Creek Township covers an area of 31.71 square miles (82.12 square kilometers); of this, 31.67 square miles (82.03 square kilometers, 99.89 percent) is land and 0.03 square miles (0.08 square kilometers, 0.1 percent) is water.

=== Cities, towns, villages ===
- Adrian (partial)

=== Unincorporated towns ===
- Coleville at 38.415573°N 94.30217°W
- Crescent Hill at 38.432239°N 94.347449°W

(This list is based on USGS data and may include former settlements.)

=== Adjacent townships ===
- Austin Township, Cass County (north)
- Grand River Township (east)
- Shawnee Township (southeast)
- Mound Township (south)
- Elkhart Township (southwest)
- East Boone Township (west)

=== Cemeteries ===
The township contains Crescent Hill Cemetery.

=== Major highways ===
- U.S. Route 71

=== Rivers ===
- South Grand River

== School districts ==
- Adrian R-III School District
- Cass County R-V

== Political districts ==
- Missouri's 4th congressional district
- State House District 120
- State House District 125
- State Senate District 31
