= Spruce Township, Bates County, Missouri =

Spruce Township
- Township
- Location in Bates County
- Coordinates: 38°20′48″N 94°07′27″W
- Country: United States
- State: Missouri
- County: Bates

Area
  - Total: 36.12 sq mi (93.56 km^{2})
  - Land: 36.12 sq mi (93.56 km^{2})
  - Water: 0 sq mi (0 km^{2}) 0%
- Elevation: 860 ft (262 m)

Population (2000)
  - Total: 288
  - Density: 8.0/sq mi (3.1/km^{2})
- Time zone: UTC-6 (CST)
  - Summer (DST): UTC-5 (CDT)
- ZIP codes: 64720, 64730, 64770, 64788
- GNIS feature ID: 0766308

Spruce Township is one of twenty-four townships in Bates County, Missouri, and is part of the Kansas City metropolitan area within the USA. As of the 2000 census, its population was 288.

== Geography ==
According to the United States Census Bureau, Spruce Township covers an area of 36.13 square miles (93.56 square kilometers).

=== Unincorporated towns ===
- Ballard at 38.361409°N 94.143278°W
- Johnstown at 38.310022°N 94.082444°W

(This list is based on USGS data and may include former settlements.)

=== Adjacent townships ===
- Mingo Township (north)
- White Oak Township, Henry County (northeast)
- Walker Township, Henry County (east)
- Deepwater Township, Henry County (southeast)
- Deepwater Township (south)
- Summit Township (southwest)
- Shawnee Township (west)
- Grand River Township (northwest)

=== Cemeteries ===
The township contains these three cemeteries: Antioch, Poage and Walnut Grove.

== School districts ==
- Ballard R-II

== Political districts ==
- Missouri's 4th congressional district
- State House District 120
- State Senate District 31
