= Grand River Township, Bates County, Missouri =

Grand River Township
- Township
- Location in Bates County
- Coordinates: 38°25′41″N 94°13′03″W
- Country: United States
- State: Missouri
- County: Bates

Area
  - Total: 25.1 sq mi (64.9 km^{2})
  - Land: 25.1 sq mi (64.9 km^{2})
  - Water: 0 sq mi (0 km^{2}) 0%
- Elevation: 856 ft (261 m)

Population (2000)
  - Total: 251
  - Density: 10/sq mi (3.9/km^{2})
- Time zone: UTC-6 (CST)
  - Summer (DST): UTC-5 (CDT)
- ZIP codes: 64720, 64725, 64747
- GNIS feature ID: 0766294

Grand River Township is one of twenty-four townships in Bates County, Missouri, and is part of the Kansas City metropolitan area within the USA. As of the 2000 census, its population was 251.

Grand River Township was established in 1870, and named after the Grand River.

== Geography ==
According to the United States Census Bureau, Grand River Township covers an area of 25.06 square miles (64.9 square kilometers).

=== Unincorporated towns ===
- Altona at 38.399741°N 94.234946°W

(This list is based on USGS data and may include former settlements.)

=== Adjacent townships ===
- Dayton Township, Cass County (north)
- Mingo Township (east)
- Spruce Township (southeast)
- Shawnee Township (south)
- Mound Township (southwest)
- Deer Creek Township (west)
- Austin Township, Cass County (northwest)

== School districts ==
- Adrian R-III School District
- Ballard R-II
- Cass County R-V

== Political districts ==
- Missouri's 4th congressional district
- State House District 120
- State Senate District 31
