= Rockville Township, Bates County, Missouri =

Rockville Township
- Township
- Location in Bates County
- Coordinates: 38°04′22″N 94°05′16″W
- Country: United States
- State: Missouri
- County: Bates

Area
  - Total: 25.17 sq mi (65.19 km^{2})
  - Land: 24.67 sq mi (63.89 km^{2})
  - Water: 0.50 sq mi (1.3 km^{2}) 1.99%
- Elevation: 751 ft (229 m)

Population (2000)
  - Total: 271
  - Density: 11/sq mi (4.2/km^{2})
- Time zone: UTC-6 (CST)
  - Summer (DST): UTC-5 (CDT)
- ZIP codes: 64724, 64780
- GNIS feature ID: 0766306

Rockville Township is one of twenty-four townships in Bates County, Missouri, and is part of the Kansas City metropolitan area within the USA. As of the 2000 census, its population was 271.

Rockville Township was established in 1872, taking its name from Rockville, Missouri.

== Geography ==
According to the United States Census Bureau, Rockville Township covers an area of 25.17 square miles (65.19 square kilometers); of this, 24.67 square miles (63.89 square kilometers, 98.01 percent) is land and 0.5 square miles (1.3 square kilometers, 1.99 percent) is water.

=== Cities, towns, villages ===
- Rockville

=== Adjacent townships ===
- Hudson Township (north)
- Appleton Township, St. Clair County (northeast)
- Taber Township, St. Clair County (east)
- Speedwell Township, St. Clair County (southeast)
- Bacon Township, Vernon County (south)
- Blue Mound Township, Vernon County (southwest)
- Prairie Township (west)
- Pleasant Gap Township (northwest)

=== Cemeteries ===
The township contains Rockville Cemetery.

=== Airports and landing strips ===
- Heiman Field

=== Lakes ===
- Horseshoe Lake
- Jones Lake

== School districts ==
- Appleton City R-II
- Rich Hill R-IV

== Political districts ==
- Missouri's 4th congressional district
- State House District 120
- State Senate District 31
