= Hudson Township, Bates County, Missouri =

Hudson Township
- Township
- Location in Bates County
- Coordinates: 38°09′50″N 94°05′45″W
- Country: United States
- State: Missouri
- County: Bates

Area
  - Total: 45.99 sq mi (119.11 km^{2})
  - Land: 45.92 sq mi (118.93 km^{2})
  - Water: 0.069 sq mi (0.18 km^{2}) 0.15%
- Elevation: 791 ft (241 m)

Population (2000)
  - Total: 229
  - Density: 4.9/sq mi (1.9/km^{2})
- Time zone: UTC-6 (CST)
  - Summer (DST): UTC-5 (CDT)
- ZIP codes: 64724, 64730, 64780
- GNIS feature ID: 0766297

Hudson Township is one of twenty-four townships in Bates County, Missouri, and is part of the Kansas City metropolitan area within the USA. As of the 2000 census, its population was 229. As of the 2010 census, the town's population was 252. Its population was estimated to be 226 in 2018.

== History ==
Hudson was named for the explorer Henry Hudson.

== Geography ==
According to the United States Census Bureau, Hudson Township covers an area of 45.99 square miles (119.11 square kilometers); of this, 45.92 square miles (118.93 square kilometers, 99.85 percent) is land and 0.07 square miles (0.18 square kilometers, 0.15 percent) is water.

=== Unincorporated towns ===
- Hudson at 38.203637°N 94.090222°W

(This list is based on USGS data and may include former settlements.)

=== Adjacent townships ===
- Deepwater Township (north)
- Deepwater Township, Henry County (northeast)
- Appleton Township, St. Clair County (east)
- Taber Township, St. Clair County (southeast)
- Rockville Township (south)
- Prairie Township (southwest)
- Pleasant Gap Township (west)

=== Cemeteries ===
The township contains these four cemeteries: Blackwell, Meyer, Myers and Round Prairie.

=== Major highways ===
- Missouri Route 52

=== Lakes ===
- Appleton City Lake

== School districts ==
Hudson R-IX School District, an elementary school district, covers almost all of the township. A small piece is within the Rich Hill R-IV School District.

Both school districts are in the service area of Metropolitan Community College, but not its in-district taxation area.

== Political districts ==
- Missouri's 4th congressional district
- State House District 120
- State Senate District 31

== Notable people ==
- Daniel C. Jackling, mining tycoon, was born here
