= Mound Township, Bates County, Missouri =

Mound Township
- Township
- Location in Bates County
- Coordinates: 38°21′28″N 94°20′25″W
- Country: United States
- State: Missouri
- County: Bates

Area
  - Total: 36.22 sq mi (93.82 km^{2})
  - Land: 36.14 sq mi (93.59 km^{2})
  - Water: 0.089 sq mi (0.23 km^{2}) 0.25%
- Elevation: 869 ft (265 m)

Population (2000)
  - Total: 819
  - Density: 23/sq mi (8.8/km^{2})
- Time zone: UTC-6 (CST)
  - Summer (DST): UTC-5 (CDT)
- ZIP codes: 64720, 64730
- GNIS feature ID: 0766300

Mound Township is one of twenty-four townships in Bates County, Missouri, and is part of the Kansas City metropolitan area within the USA. As of the 2000 census, its population was 819.

Mound Township was named for the mounds within its borders.

== Geography ==
According to the United States Census Bureau, Mound Township covers an area of 36.23 square miles (93.82 square kilometers); of this, 36.13 square miles (93.59 square kilometers, 99.75 percent) is land and 0.09 square miles (0.23 square kilometers, 0.25 percent) is water.

=== Cities, towns, villages ===
- Adrian (partial)
- Passaic

=== Adjacent townships ===
- Deer Creek Township (north)
- Grand River Township (northeast)
- Shawnee Township (east)
- Summit Township (southeast)
- Mount Pleasant Township (south)
- Charlotte Township (southwest)
- Elkhart Township (west)
- East Boone Township (northwest)

=== Major highways ===
- U.S. Route 71

=== Landmarks ===
- City Park
- Grove Street

== School districts ==
- Adrian R-III School District
- Butler R-V School District

== Political districts ==
- Missouri's 4th congressional district
- State House District 125
- State Senate District 31
