= Knob Creek (Miami Creek tributary) =

Stream in the US state of Missouri

Knob Creek is a stream in west central Bates County in the U.S. state of Missouri. It is a tributary of Miami Creek.

The stream headwaters arise about 1.5 miles southwest of the community of Burdett and the stream flows south crossing Missouri Route 18 one-half mile west of Lacyville. The stream continues to the south to south-southeast passing under Missouri Route F to its confluence with Miami Creek about three miles northeast of Virginia on Missouri Route 52 and seven miles west-northwest of Butler and US Route 71.

The stream source area is at 38°25′02″N 94°29′52″W and the confluence is at 38°18′17″N 94°27′38″W.

The name Knob is a corruption of Knabb, the surname of a settler.

== See also ==
- List of rivers of Missouri
