= East Boone Township, Bates County, Missouri =

East Boone Township
- Township
- Location in Bates County
- Coordinates: 38°24′33″N 94°25′08″W
- Country: United States
- State: Missouri
- County: Bates

Area
  - Total: 31.88 sq mi (82.56 km^{2})
  - Land: 31.84 sq mi (82.46 km^{2})
  - Water: 0.035 sq mi (0.09 km^{2}) 0.11%
- Elevation: 850 ft (260 m)

Population (2000)
  - Total: 482
  - Density: 15/sq mi (5.8/km^{2})
- Time zone: UTC-6 (CST)
  - Summer (DST): UTC-5 (CDT)
- ZIP codes: 64720, 64742
- GNIS feature ID: 0766292

East Boone Township is one of twenty-four townships in Bates County, Missouri, and is part of the Kansas City metropolitan area within the USA. As of the 2000 census, its population was 482.

East Boone Township derives its name from the pioneer Daniel Boone.

== Geography ==
According to the United States Census Bureau, East Boone Township covers an area of 31.87 square miles (82.56 square kilometers); of this, 31.84 square miles (82.46 square kilometers, 99.88 percent) is land and 0.04 square miles (0.09 square kilometers, 0.11 percent) is water.

=== Unincorporated towns ===
- Burdett at 38.433627°N 94.482730°W
- Lacyville at 38.39724°N 94.482453°W

(This list is based on USGS data and may include former settlements.)

=== Adjacent townships ===
- Everett Township, Cass County (north)
- Austin Township, Cass County (northeast)
- Deer Creek Township (east)
- Mound Township (southeast)
- Elkhart Township (south)
- West Point Township (southwest)
- West Boone Township (west)

=== Cemeteries ===
The township contains Burdett Cemetery.

== School districts ==
- Adrian R-III School District

== Political districts ==
- Missouri's 4th congressional district
- State House District 125
- State Senate District 31
