= Prairie Township, Bates County, Missouri =

Prairie Township
- Township
- Location in Bates County
- Coordinates: 38°04′55″N 94°13′25″W
- Country: United States
- State: Missouri
- County: Bates

Area
  - Total: 26.17 sq mi (67.77 km^{2})
  - Land: 25.88 sq mi (67.04 km^{2})
  - Water: 0.28 sq mi (0.73 km^{2}) 1.08%
- Elevation: 771 ft (235 m)

Population (2000)
  - Total: 153
  - Density: 6.0/sq mi (2.3/km^{2})
- Time zone: UTC-6 (CST)
  - Summer (DST): UTC-5 (CDT)
- ZIP codes: 64779, 64780
- GNIS feature ID: 0766305

Prairie Township is one of twenty-four townships in Bates County, Missouri, and is part of the Kansas City metropolitan area within the USA. As of the 2000 census, its population was 153.

The township derives its name from the community of Prairie City, Missouri.

== Geography ==
According to the United States Census Bureau, Prairie Township covers an area of 26.16 square miles (67.77 square kilometers); of this, 25.88 square miles (67.04 square kilometers, 98.92 percent) is land and 0.28 square miles (0.73 square kilometers, 1.08 percent) is water.

=== Unincorporated towns ===
- Papinville at 38.067253°N 94.226892°W
- Prairie City at 38.078919°N 94.174668°W

(This list is based on USGS data and may include former settlements.)

=== Adjacent townships ===
- Pleasant Gap Township (north)
- Hudson Township (northeast)
- Rockville Township (east)
- Bacon Township, Vernon County (southeast)
- Blue Mound Township, Vernon County (south)
- Osage Township, Vernon County (southwest)
- Osage Township (west)
- Lone Oak Township (northwest)

=== Lakes ===
- Carrico Lake
- Helem Lake
- Kineberger Lake
- Prairie Lake

== School districts ==
- Rich Hill R-IV

== Political districts ==
- Missouri's 4th congressional district
- State House District 120
- State House District 125
- State Senate District 31
