= Deepwater Township, Bates County, Missouri =

Township in the US state of Missouri

Deepwater Township
- Township
- Location in Bates County
- Coordinates: 38°15′18″N 94°07′53″W
- Country: United States
- State: Missouri
- County: Bates

Area
  - Total: 35.92 sq mi (93.03 km^{2})
  - Land: 36 sq mi (93 km^{2})
  - Water: 0.012 sq mi (0.03 km^{2}) 0.03%
- Elevation: 902 ft (275 m)

Population (2000)
  - Total: 247
  - Density: 7.0/sq mi (2.7/km^{2})
- Time zone: UTC-6 (CST)
  - Summer (DST): UTC-5 (CDT)
- ZIP codes: 64730, 64770
- GNIS feature ID: 0766290

Deepwater Township is one of twenty-four townships in Bates County, Missouri, and is part of the Kansas City metropolitan area within the USA. As of the 2000 census, its population was 247.

Deepwater Township took its name from a nearby creek.

== Geography ==
According to the United States Census Bureau, Deepwater Township covers an area of 35.92 square miles (93.03 square kilometers); of this, 35.91 square miles (93 square kilometers, 99.97 percent) is land and 0.01 square miles (0.03 square kilometers, 0.03 percent) is water.

=== Unincorporated towns ===
- Spruce at 38.266413°N 94.133279°W

(This list is based on USGS data and may include former settlements.)

=== Adjacent townships ===
- Spruce Township (north)
- Walker Township, Henry County (northeast)
- Hudson Township (south)
- Pleasant Gap Township (southwest)
- Summit Township (west)
- Shawnee Township (northwest)

=== Cemeteries ===
The township contains these four cemeteries: Radford, Smith, Snodgrass Union and White.

== School districts ==
The northern half of the township is in the Ballard R-II School District. The southern half of the township is in Hudson R-IX School District, an elementary school district.

== Political districts ==
- Missouri's 4th congressional district
- State House District 120
- State Senate District 31
