= Pleasant Gap =

Pleasant Gap may refer to:

- Pleasant Gap, Alabama
- Pleasant Gap, Missouri
- Pleasant Gap Township, Bates County, Missouri
- Pleasant Gap, Pennsylvania
- Pleasant Gap, Virginia
