= Lone Oak Township, Bates County, Missouri =

Township in the US state of Missouri

Lone Oak Township
- Township
- Location in Bates County
- Coordinates: 38°10′20″N 94°18′40″W
- Country: United States
- State: Missouri
- County: Bates

Area
  - Total: 35.97 sq mi (93.15 km^{2})
  - Land: 35.94 sq mi (93.08 km^{2})
  - Water: 0.027 sq mi (0.07 km^{2}) 0.08%
- Elevation: 817 ft (249 m)

Population (2000)
  - Total: 293
  - Density: 8.0/sq mi (3.1/km^{2})
- Time zone: UTC-6 (CST)
  - Summer (DST): UTC-5 (CDT)
- ZIP codes: 64730, 64779
- GNIS feature ID: 0766298

Lone Oak Township is one of twenty-four townships in Bates County, Missouri, and is part of the Kansas City metropolitan area within the USA. As of the 2000 census, its population was 293.

The township takes its name from Lone Oak Branch creek.

== Geography ==
According to the United States Census Bureau, Lone Oak Township covers an area of 35.96 square miles (93.15 square kilometers); of this, 35.94 square miles (93.08 square kilometers, 99.92 percent) is land and 0.03 square miles (0.07 square kilometers, 0.08 percent) is water.

=== Unincorporated towns ===
- Athol at 38.172527°N 94.37884°W
- Monteith Junction at 38.214192°N 94.366896°W
- Peru at 38.182527°N 94.291894°W

(This list is based on USGS data and may include former settlements.)

=== Adjacent townships ===
- Mount Pleasant Township (north)
- Summit Township (northeast)
- Pleasant Gap Township (east)
- Prairie Township (southeast)
- Osage Township (southwest)
- New Home Township (west)

=== Cemeteries ===
The township contains Fairview Cemetery.

=== Major highways ===
- U.S. Route 71
- Missouri Route 52

== School districts ==
- Butler R-V School District
- Rich Hill R-IV

== Political districts ==
- Missouri's 4th congressional district
- State House District 125
- State Senate District 31
