= Howard Township, Bates County, Missouri =

Howard Township
- Township
- Location in Bates County
- Coordinates: 38°05′32″N 94°33′41″W
- Country: United States
- State: Missouri
- County: Bates

Area
  - Total: 37.17 sq mi (96.28 km^{2})
  - Land: 36.90 sq mi (95.57 km^{2})
  - Water: 0.27 sq mi (0.71 km^{2}) 0.74%
- Elevation: 892 ft (272 m)

Population (2000)
  - Total: 552
  - Density: 15/sq mi (5.8/km^{2})
- Time zone: UTC-6 (CST)
  - Summer (DST): UTC-5 (CDT)
- ZIP codes: 64752, 64779
- GNIS feature ID: 0766296

Howard Township is one of twenty-four townships in Bates County, Missouri, and is part of the Kansas City metropolitan area within the USA. As of the 2000 census, its population was 552.

Howard Township has the name of territorial governor Benjamin Howard.

== Geography ==
According to the United States Census Bureau, Howard Township covers an area of 37.17 square miles (96.28 square kilometers); of this, 36.9 square miles (95.57 square kilometers, 99.26 percent) is land and 0.27 square miles (0.71 square kilometers, 0.74 percent) is water.

=== Cities, towns, villages ===
- Hume

=== Unincorporated towns ===
- Sprague at 38.095586°N 94.459675°W

(This list is based on USGS data and may include former settlements.)

=== Adjacent townships ===
- Walnut Township (north)
- New Home Township (northeast)
- Osage Township (east)
- Metz Township, Vernon County (southeast)
- Henry Township, Vernon County (south)
- Sheridan Township, Linn County, Kansas (west)

== School districts ==
- Hume R-VIII
- Rich Hill R-IV

== Political districts ==
- Missouri's 4th congressional district
- State House District 125
- State Senate District 31
