= Amsterdam, Missouri =

- City
- Location of Amsterdam, Missouri
- Coordinates: 38°20′58″N 94°35′21″W
- Country: United States
- State: Missouri
- County: Bates
- Incorporated: 1971

Area
  - Total: 0.58 sq mi (1.49 km^{2})
  - Land: 0.57 sq mi (1.48 km^{2})
  - Water: 0.0039 sq mi (0.01 km^{2})
- Elevation: 886 ft (270 m)

Population (2020)
  - Total: 218
  - Density: 381.7/sq mi (147.37/km^{2})
- Time zone: UTC-6 (Central (CST))
  - Summer (DST): UTC-5 (CDT)
- ZIP code: 64723
- Area code: 660
- FIPS code: 29-01090
- GNIS feature ID: 2393949

Amsterdam is a city in western Bates County, Missouri, and is part of the Kansas City metropolitan area within the United States. The population was 218 at the 2020 census.

== History ==
Amsterdam was platted in 1891. The city was named after Amsterdam, capital of the Netherlands. Arthur Stilwell, an early-20th-century railroad executive, chose it because the Dutch capital was where the firm of an important railway financier, Jan de Goeijen, was located. A post office has been in operation at Amsterdam since 1892.

== Geography ==
Amsterdam is located on Missouri Route Y three miles south of Merwin, six miles north of Amoret and 14 miles northwest of Butler. The Missouri-Kansas border is about one mile to the west.

According to the United States Census Bureau, the city has a total area of 0.57 square miles (1.48 km^{2}), all land.

== Demographics ==
Historical population
Census	Pop.	Note	%±
1900	142		—
1910	162		14.1%
1920	188		16.0%
1930	179		−4.8%
1940	172		−3.9%
1950	160		−7.0%
1960	118		−26.2%
1970	120		1.7%
1980	231		92.5%
1990	237		2.6%
2000	281		18.6%
2010	242		−13.9%
2020	218		−9.9%
U.S. Decennial Census

=== 2010 census ===
As of the census of 2010, there were 242 people, 95 households, and 62 families living in the city. The population density was 424.6 inhabitants per square mile (163.9/km^{2}). There were 106 housing units at an average density of 186.0 per square mile (71.8/km^{2}). The racial makeup of the city was 96.3% White, 0.4% African American, 1.7% Native American, and 1.7% from two or more races. Hispanic or Latino of any race were 1.2% of the population.

There were 95 households, of which 34.7% had children under the age of 18 living with them, 48.4% were married couples living together, 9.5% had a female householder with no husband present, 7.4% had a male householder with no wife present, and 34.7% were non-families. 26.3% of all households were made up of individuals, and 13.7% had someone living alone who was 65 years of age or older. The average household size was 2.55 and the average family size was 3.06.

The median age in the city was 38 years. 26.9% of residents were under the age of 18; 8.7% were between the ages of 18 and 24; 23.6% were from 25 to 44; 28% were from 45 to 64; and 12.8% were 65 years of age or older. The gender makeup of the city was 49.6% male and 50.4% female.

=== 2000 census ===
As of the census of 2000, there were 281 people, 102 households, and 69 families living in the city. The population density was 480.9 inhabitants per square mile (185.7/km^{2}). There were 109 housing units at an average density of 186.6 per square mile (72.0/km^{2}). The racial makeup of the city was 98.22% White, 0.71% Native American, and 1.07% from two or more races.

There were 102 households, out of which 36.3% had children under the age of 18 living with them, 56.9% were married couples living together, 6.9% had a female householder with no husband present, and 31.4% were non-families. 23.5% of all households were made up of individuals, and 6.9% had someone living alone who was 65 years of age or older. The average household size was 2.75 and the average family size was 3.30.

In the city the population was spread out, with 29.9% under the age of 18, 8.5% from 18 to 24, 31.0% from 25 to 44, 19.6% from 45 to 64, and 11.0% who were 65 years of age or older. The median age was 34 years. For every 100 females, there were 100.7 males. For every 100 females age 18 and over, there were 105.2 males.

The median income for a household in the city was $29,821, and the median income for a family was $34,545. Males had a median income of $23,333 versus $21,625 for females. The per capita income for the city was $11,670. About 15.0% of families and 16.0% of the population were below the poverty line, including 25.0% of those under the age of eighteen and 5.0% of those over the age of sixty five.

== Education ==
It is in the Miami R-I School District.

Metropolitan Community College has the Miami school district area in its service area, but not its in-district taxation area.
