= Walnut Township, Bates County, Missouri =

Township in the US state of Missouri

Walnut Township
- Township
- Location in Bates County
- Coordinates: 38°09′09″N 94°32′25″W
- Country: United States
- State: Missouri
- County: Bates

Area
  - Total: 45.88 sq mi (118.84 km^{2})
  - Land: 45.65 sq mi (118.24 km^{2})
  - Water: 0.23 sq mi (0.6 km^{2}) 0.5%
- Elevation: 830 ft (253 m)

Population (2000)
  - Total: 419
  - Density: 9.1/sq mi (3.5/km^{2})
- Time zone: UTC-6 (CST)
  - Summer (DST): UTC-5 (CDT)
- ZIP codes: 64722, 64730, 64745, 64752, 64779
- GNIS feature ID: 0766310

Walnut Township is one of twenty-four townships in Bates County, Missouri, and is part of the Kansas City metropolitan area within the USA. As of the 2000 census, its population was 419.

== Geography ==
According to the United States Census Bureau, Walnut Township covers an area of 45.88 square miles (118.84 square kilometers); of this, 45.65 square miles (118.24 square kilometers, 99.5 percent) is land and 0.23 square miles (0.6 square kilometers, 0.5 percent) is water.

=== Cities, towns, villages ===
- Foster

=== Unincorporated towns ===
- Worland at 38.187805°N 94.5919°W

(This list is based on USGS data and may include former settlements.)

=== Adjacent townships ===
- Homer Township (north)
- Charlotte Township (northeast)
- New Home Township (east)
- Howard Township (south)
- Sheridan Township, Linn County, Kansas (southwest)
- Potosi Township, Linn County, Kansas (west)
- Valley Township, Linn County, Kansas (northwest)

=== Cemeteries ===
The township contains these two cemeteries: Salem and Woodfin.

=== Airports and landing strips ===
- Oerke Enterprises Airport

== School districts ==
- Hume R-VIII
- Miami R-I
- Rich Hill R-IV

== Political districts ==
- Missouri's 4th congressional district
- State House District 125
- State Senate District 31
