= Mount Pleasant Township, Bates County, Missouri =

Mount Pleasant Township
- Township
- Location in Bates County
- Coordinates: 38°15′26″N 94°20′39″W
- Country: United States
- State: Missouri
- County: Bates

Area
  - Total: 35.95 sq mi (93.11 km^{2})
  - Land: 35.80 sq mi (92.71 km^{2})
  - Water: 0.16 sq mi (0.41 km^{2}) 0.44%
- Elevation: 837 ft (255 m)

Population (2000)
  - Total: 5,060
  - Density: 141/sq mi (54.6/km^{2})
- Time zone: UTC-6 (CST)
  - Summer (DST): UTC-5 (CDT)
- ZIP code: 64730
- GNIS feature ID: 0766301

Mount Pleasant Township is one of twenty-four townships in Bates County, Missouri, and is part of the Kansas City metropolitan area within the USA. As of the 2000 census, its population was 5,060.

The township was descriptively named.

== Geography ==
According to the United States Census Bureau, Mount Pleasant Township covers an area of 35.95 square miles (93.11 square kilometers); of this, 35.79 square miles (92.71 square kilometers, 99.57 percent) is land and 0.16 square miles (0.41 square kilometers, 0.44 percent) is water.

=== Cities, towns, villages ===
- Butler

=== Adjacent townships ===
- Mound Township (north)
- Shawnee Township (northeast)
- Summit Township (east)
- Lone Oak Township (south)
- New Home Township (southwest)
- Charlotte Township (west)
- Elkhart Township (northwest)

=== Cemeteries ===
The township contains these two cemeteries: Morris and Oak Hill.

=== Major highways ===
- U.S. Route 71
- Missouri Route 52

=== Airports and landing strips ===
- Bates County Hospital Heliport
- Butler Memorial Airport

=== Lakes ===
- Butler Recreational Lake
- Kennedy Lake

=== Landmarks ===
- Butler Country Club Golf Course
- Butler Golf Course

=== Streams ===
- Miami Creek
- Mound Branch

== School districts ==
- Butler R-V School District

== Political districts ==
- Missouri's 4th congressional district
- State House District 125
- State Senate District 31
