= Mingo Creek (South Grand River tributary) =

Stream in Bates County, Missouri, U.S.

Mingo Creek is a stream in Bates County in the U.S. state of Missouri. It is a tributary of the South Grand River.

The headwaters arise at 38°21′15″N 94°15′52″W at an elevation of 880 ft (270 m). The stream flows generally north passing under Missouri Route 18 one mile southwest of the community of Altona. The stream turns to the northeast and flows approximately four miles to its confluence with the old South Grand River channel at 38°26′54″N 94°13′22″W at an elevation of 768 ft (234 m).

Mingo Creek has the name of the Mingo Native Americans.

== See also ==
- List of rivers of Missouri
