= Pleasant Gap Township, Bates County, Missouri =

Township in the US state of Missouri

Pleasant Gap Township
- Township
- Location in Bates County
- Coordinates: 38°09′28″N 94°13′09″W
- Country: United States
- State: Missouri
- County: Bates

Area
  - Total: 45.64 sq mi (118.22 km^{2})
  - Land: 45.61 sq mi (118.12 km^{2})
  - Water: 0.039 sq mi (0.1 km^{2}) 0.08%
- Elevation: 820 ft (250 m)

Population (2000)
  - Total: 264
  - Density: 5.7/sq mi (2.2/km^{2})
- Time zone: UTC-6 (CST)
  - Summer (DST): UTC-5 (CDT)
- ZIP codes: 64724, 64730, 64779
- GNIS feature ID: 0766304

Pleasant Gap Township is one of twenty-four townships in Bates County, Missouri, and is part of the Kansas City metropolitan area within the USA. As of the 2000 census, its population was 264.

The township took its name from the community of Pleasant Gap, Missouri.

== Geography ==
According to the United States Census Bureau, Pleasant Gap Township covers an area of 45.64 square miles (118.22 square kilometers); of this, 45.61 square miles (118.12 square kilometers, 99.92 percent) is land and 0.04 square miles (0.1 square kilometers, 0.08 percent) is water.

=== Unincorporated towns ===
- Pleasant Gap at 38.172805°N 94.182169°W

(This list is based on USGS data and may include former settlements.)

=== Adjacent townships ===
- Summit Township (north)
- Deepwater Township (northeast)
- Hudson Township (east)
- Rockville Township (southeast)
- Prairie Township (south)
- Lone Oak Township (west)

=== Cemeteries ===
The township contains Rogers Cemetery.

=== Major highways ===
- Missouri Route 52

=== Airports and landing strips ===
- Bauer PGI Airport

== School districts ==
School districts covering portions of the township include:

- Butler R-V School District
- Rich Hill R-IV School District
- Hudson R-IX School District (elementary school district)

All three school districts are in the service area of Metropolitan Community College, but not its in-district taxation area.

== Political districts ==
- Missouri's 4th congressional district
- State House District 120
- State House District 125
- State Senate District 31
