= New Home Township =

New Home Township may refer to:

- New Home Township, Bates County, Missouri
- New Home Township, Williams County, North Dakota, in Williams County, North Dakota
