= Lone Oak Branch =

Stream in Bates County, Missouri, U.S.

Coordinates: 38°08′39″N 94°17′24″W

Lone Oak Branch is a stream in Bates County in the U.S. state of Missouri. It is a tributary to Double Branch.

Lone Oak Branch was named for an individual oak tree which tradition states was once used as a hanging tree.

== See also ==
- List of rivers of Missouri
