= New Home Township, Bates County, Missouri =

Township in the US state of Missouri

New Home Township
- Township
- Location in Bates County
- Coordinates: 38°09′30″N 94°27′20″W
- Country: United States
- State: Missouri
- County: Bates

Area
  - Total: 44.6 sq mi (115.6 km^{2})
  - Land: 44.53 sq mi (115.32 km^{2})
  - Water: 0.11 sq mi (0.28 km^{2}) 0.24%
- Elevation: 768 ft (234 m)

Population (2000)
  - Total: 222
  - Density: 4.9/sq mi (1.9/km^{2})
- Time zone: UTC-6 (CST)
  - Summer (DST): UTC-5 (CDT)
- ZIP codes: 64730, 64779
- GNIS feature ID: 0766302

New Home Township is one of twenty-four townships in Bates County, Missouri, and is part of the Kansas City metropolitan area within the USA. As of the 2000 census, its population was 222.

== History ==
The township takes its name from the community of New Home, Missouri.

== Geography ==
According to the United States Census Bureau, New Home Township covers an area of 44.63 square miles (115.6 square kilometers); of this, 44.53 square miles (115.32 square kilometers, 99.76 percent) is land and 0.11 square miles (0.28 square kilometers, 0.24 percent) is water.

=== Unincorporated towns ===
- New Home at 38.14364°N 94.472453°W
- Nyhart at 38.204193°N 94.433563°W

(This list is based on USGS data and may include former settlements.)

=== Adjacent townships ===
- Charlotte Township (north)
- Mount Pleasant Township (northeast)
- Lone Oak Township (east)
- Osage Township (southeast)
- Howard Township (southwest)
- Walnut Township (west)

=== Cemeteries ===
The township contains Thomas Cemetery.

=== Rivers ===
- Marias des Cygnes River

=== Lakes ===
- Brushy Mound Lake

== School districts ==
- Butler R-V School District
- Hume R-VIII
- Rich Hill R-IV

== Political districts ==
- Missouri's 4th congressional district
- State House District 125
- State Senate District 31
