= Shawnee Township, Bates County, Missouri =

Township in the US state of Missouri

Shawnee Township
- Township
- Location in Bates County
- Coordinates: 38°20′55″N 94°14′07″W
- Country: United States
- State: Missouri
- County: Bates

Area
  - Total: 35.81 sq mi (92.76 km^{2})
  - Land: 35.76 sq mi (92.61 km^{2})
  - Water: 0.058 sq mi (0.15 km^{2}) 0.16%
- Elevation: 846 ft (258 m)

Population (2000)
  - Total: 277
  - Density: 7.8/sq mi (3/km^{2})
- Time zone: UTC-6 (CST)
  - Summer (DST): UTC-5 (CDT)
- ZIP codes: 64720, 64730
- GNIS feature ID: 0766307

Shawnee Township is one of twenty-four townships in Bates County, Missouri, and is part of the Kansas City metropolitan area within the USA. As of the 2000 census, its population was 277.

Shawnee Township has the name of the Shawnee Indians.

== Geography ==
According to the United States Census Bureau, Shawnee Township covers an area of 35.82 square miles (92.76 square kilometers); of this, 35.76 square miles (92.61 square kilometers, 99.84 percent) is land and 0.06 square miles (0.15 square kilometers, 0.16 percent) is water.

=== Adjacent townships ===
- Grand River Township (north)
- Mingo Township (northeast)
- Spruce Township (east)
- Deepwater Township (southeast)
- Summit Township (south)
- Mount Pleasant Township (southwest)
- Mound Township (west)
- Deer Creek Township (northwest)

=== Cemeteries ===
The township contains these three cemeteries: Cloud, France and Nichols.

== School districts ==
- Adrian R-III School District
- Ballard R-II
- Butler R-V School District

== Political districts ==
- Missouri's 4th congressional district
- State House District 120
- State Senate District 31
