= Osage Township, Bates County, Missouri =

Township in the US state of Missouri

Osage Township
- Township
- Location in Bates County
- Coordinates: 38°05′30″N 94°21′25″W
- Country: United States
- State: Missouri
- County: Bates

Area
  - Total: 44.85 sq mi (116.17 km^{2})
  - Land: 44.73 sq mi (115.84 km^{2})
  - Water: 0.13 sq mi (0.33 km^{2}) 0.28%
- Elevation: 781 ft (238 m)

Population (2000)
  - Total: 1,837
  - Density: 41/sq mi (15.9/km^{2})
- Time zone: UTC-6 (CST)
  - Summer (DST): UTC-5 (CDT)
- ZIP codes: 64730, 64779
- GNIS feature ID: 0766303

Osage Township is one of twenty-four townships in Bates County, Missouri, and is part of the Kansas City metropolitan area within the USA. As of the 2000 census, its population was 1,837.

The township takes its name from the Osage River.

== Geography ==
According to the United States Census Bureau, Osage Township covers an area of 44.86 square miles (116.17 square kilometers); of this, 44.73 square miles (115.84 square kilometers, 99.72 percent) is land and 0.13 square miles (0.33 square kilometers, 0.28 percent) is water.

=== Cities, towns, villages ===
- Rich Hill

=== Adjacent townships ===
- Lone Oak Township (northeast)
- Prairie Township (east)
- Blue Mound Township, Vernon County (southeast)
- Metz Township, Vernon County (southwest)
- Howard Township (west)
- New Home Township (northwest)

=== Cemeteries ===
The township contains these two cemeteries: Fairview Rider and Greenlawn.

=== Major highways ===
- U.S. Route 71

=== Airports and landing strips ===
- Schooley Airport

== School districts ==
- Rich Hill R-IV

== Political districts ==
- Missouri's 4th congressional district
- State House District 125
- State Senate District 31
