= Charlotte Township, Bates County, Missouri =

Charlotte Township
- Township
- Location in Bates County
- Coordinates: 38°15′54″N 94°27′29″W
- Country: United States
- State: Missouri
- County: Bates

Area
  - Total: 35.97 sq mi (93.15 km^{2})
  - Land: 35.87 sq mi (92.91 km^{2})
  - Water: 0.093 sq mi (0.24 km^{2}) 0.26%
- Elevation: 869 ft (265 m)

Population (2000)
  - Total: 367
  - Density: 10/sq mi (4/km^{2})
- Time zone: UTC-6 (CST)
  - Summer (DST): UTC-5 (CDT)
- ZIP codes: 64722, 64730
- GNIS feature ID: 0766289

Charlotte Township is one of twenty-four townships in Bates County, Missouri, and is part of the Kansas City metropolitan area within the USA. As of the 2000 census, its population was 367.

== Geography ==
According to the United States Census Bureau, Charlotte Township covers an area of 35.97 square miles (93.15 square kilometers); of this, 35.87 square miles (92.91 square kilometers, 99.74 percent) is land and 0.09 square miles (0.24 square kilometers, 0.26 percent) is water.

=== Unincorporated towns ===
- Virginia at 38.266968°N 94.495787°W

(This list is based on USGS data and may include former settlements.)

=== Adjacent townships ===
- Elkhart Township (north)
- Mound Township (northeast)
- Mount Pleasant Township (east)
- New Home Township (south)
- Walnut Township (southwest)
- Homer Township (west)
- West Point Township (northwest)

=== Cemeteries ===
The township contains these two cemeteries: Park and Virginia.

=== Major highways ===
- Missouri Route 52

=== Lakes ===
- Butler Lake

=== Landmarks ===
- Park Cemetery
- Virginia Cemetery

== School districts ==
- Butler R-V School District
- Miami R-I

== Political districts ==
- Missouri's 4th congressional district
- State House District 125
- State Senate District 31
