= Nyhart =

Nyhart may refer to:

- Lynn K. Nyhart, American historian of science
- Nyhart, Missouri, an unincorporated community in Bates County, Missouri, US
