= Shobe, Missouri =

Extinct hamlet in Missouri, U.S.

Coordinates: 38.128°N 94.386°W

Shobe is an extinct town in Bates County, in the U.S. state of Missouri.

A post office called Shobe was established in 1881, and remained in operation until 1899. The community has the name of Haley Shobe, an early citizen.
