= Knob Creek =

Knob Creek can refer to:

Several streams in the US, including:

- Knob Creek, in Izard County, Arkansas
- Knob Creek, in Bullitt County, Kentucky
- Knob Creek, in Graves County, Kentucky
- Knob Creek (Miami Creek), a stream in Missouri
- Knob Creek (South Grand River), a stream in west central Missouri
- Knob Creek (Stouts Creek), a stream in Missouri
- Knob Creek, in Cleveland County, North Carolina
- Knob Creek, in Lauderdale County, Tennessee
- Knob Creek, in Lawrence County, Tennessee
- Knob Creek, in Sevier County, Tennessee
- Knob Creek, in Washington County, Tennessee

Other

- Knob Creek Farm, boyhood home of Abraham Lincoln, in LaRue County, US
- Knob Creek (bourbon), a brand of bourbon whiskey made by Beam Suntory
