= Bertha M. Wilson =

American dramatist

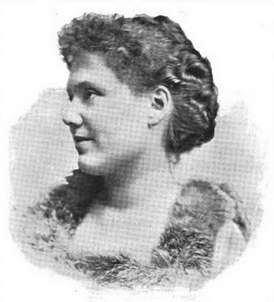
- Photo in Werner's Magazine, 1894
- Born: Bertha May Wilson; August 14, 1874; Altona, Missouri, U.S.
- Died: 1936 (aged 61–62)
- Education: State University of Iowa
- Occupations: Dramatist, critic, actress
- Spouse: Herbert Francis Allen (m. 1899)
- Writing career
- Pen name: B. M. Wilson
- Language: English
- Genres: monologues, sketches, drills, plays, dramatic, pathetic, comedy, farce, pantomime
- Notable works: Wilson's Book of Drills and Marches for Young People and Small Children

Bertha M. Wilson (pen name, B. M. Wilson; August 14, 1874 – 1936) was an American dramatist, critic, and dramatic actress, who earned a reputation throughout the Central United States. She leased some of her monologues, sketches, drills, and plays to educators and professionals. Her own work was of three kinds: home talent entertainments, including original drills, tableaux, and pantomimes; plays and farces; and costume monologues for platform and stage. Wilson's Book of Drills and Marches for Young People and Small Children was published in 1895.

== Early life and education ==
Bertha May Wilson was born in Altona, Missouri, August 14, 1874. Her father, Isaac Wilson was born in Maryland, April 24, 1824, while the mother's birth occurred in Canada on August 15, 1834. They came to Hamilton County, Iowa when Allen, the youngest in a family of nine, was a month old. In order of birth the other children were as follows: Elizabeth Jane (1854-1863), Jeanette Lamont (1855-1876), Lucy Agnes Hogan-Hohlwegler (1857-?), David Carlton (1859-1863), Joseph Lincoln (1860-?), Lillie Daugherty (1863-?), Minty May (1870-1872), and George Sears (1871-1873). The first five were natives of Illinois and the last named of Missouri. The father, who was a farmer, was for many years identified with the agricultural interests of Hamilton county, but he was living in Blairsburg, Iowa at the time of his death, which occurred January 20. 1905. The mother died on March 12, 1900.

Wilson was awarded a Bachelor of Arts degree from State University of Iowa in 1892. She also received a degree of Master of Arts. As a student she excelled in languages and literature, and won many prizes in those branches. Indeed, it was the study of classic drama in the original Greek and Latin that first interested her in this phase of literature. She was the special pupil of Helen Potter.

== Career ==
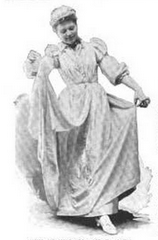
Bertha M. Wilson in "The Snow Song and Dance"

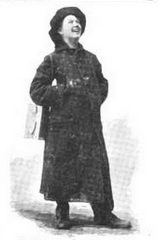
Bertha M. Wilson in "Ye're a Dandy, Ain't Yer!" (from "At Buffalo Bill's.")

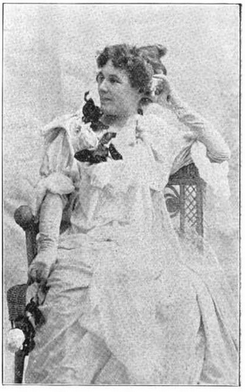
Bertha M. Wilson

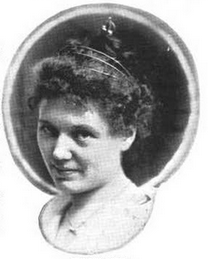
Bertha M. Wilson, in The Girl Queen

For her own amusement, Wilson began analyzing the writings of various dramatists, from the classics to the modern French and English schools, studying plot, style, treatment, and dramatic situation. Later, she tried paraphrasing and rearranging, and finally drifted into original production. Her own work was of three kinds: home talent entertainments, including original drills, tableaux, and pantomimes; plays and farces; and costume monologues for platform and stage, which was her specialty. Wilson's work was distinguished for its dramatic conception, its vividness, originality and unaffectedness. While artistic, it was written with vigor and directness. Most of it had the test of public presentation, either in home talent entertainments under her own supervision for the purpose of studying effects and gaining experiences in stage management, or in her own programs.

Wilson's experiences and painstaking study fitted her for the role of dramatic critic as well as writer. She wrote for many popular magazines and papers under different pseudonyms, and many publishers offered to handle her dramatic work.

=== Manuscripts ===
Wilson's manuscripts included monologues, sketches, drills and plays. In the 1894 season, she leased her various manuscripts to readers, actors, societies, and companies. For several years, Wilson successfully superintended in person the leasing of her manuscripts, her leasing plan fitting a special demand for those seeking something new. By keeping a sketch in manuscript form and leasing it at a price higher than the printed sketch and yet at a price not beyond the means of the average teacher or entertainer, kept it from being over-used. Entertainers preferred to "lease by the season," or have sketches written specially for them. Teachers and students favored the plan of leasing five or six different manuscripts for a single performance making a full evening's program. The manuscripts were open to examination before leasing on the payment of a US$.25 examination fee which was deducted from the regular leasing fee in case the manuscript was accepted. The list of manuscripts included the dramatic, pathetic, comedy, farce, pantomime, and the spectacular. Wilson oversaw all correspondence and was ready to offer suggestions or aid in selecting a sketch suited to someone's special purpose.

== Personal life ==
On November 8, 1899, she married Herbert Francis Allen (1864–1951). They were Congregationalists in religious faith, and assisted in the work of the various organizations of the local church of that denomination.

Bertha Wilson Allen died in 1936.

== Style ==
"A Chinese Wedding" was arranged as a costume pantomime in seven scenes, for ten male and ten female characters, with as many additional ones as desired. This pantomime could be easily produced and had a duration of twenty-five minutes. The scenes gave a vivid and faithful picture of everything pertaining to the wedding ceremony in China in that period.

"The Christmas Star" was a monologue for a young lady, lasting twenty minutes, with easy scenery and costumes. It was a story of a country maid whose musical talent is discovered bv an unexpected visitor who comes on a Christmas Eve. Through his influence, she is brought before the public, develops into a musical wonder, and later, marries him.

== Selected works ==
=== By Bertha M. Wilson ===
- Indian Sketches. An Entertainment for Home Talent, 1894
- A Chinese wedding : a representation of the wedding ceremony in China, arranged as a costume pantomime in seven scenes, 1895
- John Brown's ten little Injuns; a tomahawk march and drill for the male characters,, 1895
- Maud Muller drill; a pantomime drill for male and female characters,, 1895
- Seniors. A Three-Act Play Written for the Class of '95 of the South Dakota State Normal School, 1895
- The show at Wilkins' Hall, or, A leaf from the life of Maria Jane, 1895
- Mr. Spriggs' little trip to Europe, a comedy in one act, 1912
- Raggles' Corner, a farce in one scene ..., 1913

=== By B. M. Wilson ===
- Playing the society belle; or, The tragedy of a slipper. Comedy monologue for a woman. Time, 15 minutes., 1894
- Wilson's book of drills and marches for young people and small children of both sexes, 1895
- Spring garlands; a "pose"-y drill and march for maids and gallants of ye olden tyme., 1895
- Preciosa, the Spanish dancer., 1911

=== Drills ===
- "The bootblack drill, a novelty drill for small boys or girls"
- "The Turk-ey drill, a nonsense comedy-song drill for male characters", 1895
- "The witches' march and broom drill, a fantastic drill and march for female characters.", 1895
- "The vestal virgins : a spectacular taper drill for ten or more female characters", 1895
- "The march of the Chinese lanterns, a spectacular novelty drill for girls.", 1912

=== Monologues ===
- Nigger baby : a monologue, 1895
- The tragedy of blind Margaret; an adaptation from Longfellow's Blind girl of Castèl-Cuillè. A monologue in three scenes., 1900
- The Christmas star; a monologue in two scenes,, 1911
