= Hume, Missouri =

- City
- Location of Hume, Missouri
- Coordinates: 38°5′26″N 94°34′58″W
- Country: United States
- State: Missouri
- County: Bates
- Incorporated: 1881

Area
  - Total: 0.68 sq mi (1.76 km^{2})
  - Land: 0.66 sq mi (1.71 km^{2})
  - Water: 0.019 sq mi (0.05 km^{2})
- Elevation: 896 ft (273 m)

Population (2020)
  - Total: 283
  - Density: 427.7/sq mi (165.12/km^{2})
- Time zone: UTC-6 (Central (CST))
  - Summer (DST): UTC-5 (CDT)
- ZIP code: 64752
- Area code: 660
- FIPS code: 29-33724
- GNIS feature ID: 2397002
- Website: cityofhume.com

Hume is a city in southwest Bates County, Missouri. The population was 283 at the 2020 census.

== Geography ==
According to the United States Census Bureau, the city has a total area of 0.68 square miles (1.76 km^{2}), of which 0.66 square miles (1.71 km^{2}) is land and 0.02 square miles (0.05 km^{2}) is water.

The community lies on Missouri Route A in the southwest corner of the county. Rich Hill is approximately eleven miles to the east and the Missouri-Kansas border is 1.5 miles to the west. The headwaters of Duncan Creek arise adjacent to the southwest and Walnut Creek flows past the north of the community.

== Demographics ==
Historical population
Census	Pop.	Note	%±
1890	486		—
1900	540		11.1%
1910	514		−4.8%
1920	542		5.4%
1930	595		9.8%
1940	487		−18.2%
1950	474		−2.7%
1960	369		−22.2%
1970	350		−5.1%
1980	315		−10.0%
1990	287		−8.9%
2000	337		17.4%
2010	336		−0.3%
2020	283		−15.8%
U.S. Decennial Census

=== 2010 census ===
As of the census of 2010, there were 336 people, 122 households, and 89 families residing in the city. The population density was 509.1 inhabitants per square mile (196.6/km^{2}). There were 141 housing units at an average density of 213.6 per square mile (82.5/km^{2}). The racial makeup of the city was 95.8% White, 0.3% African American, 0.9% Asian, 0.6% from other races, and 2.4% from two or more races. Hispanic or Latino of any race were 4.5% of the population.

There were 122 households, of which 41.0% had children under the age of 18 living with them, 59.8% were married couples living together, 9.0% had a female householder with no husband present, 4.1% had a male householder with no wife present, and 27.0% were non-families. 23.8% of all households were made up of individuals, and 6.5% had someone living alone who was 65 years of age or older. The average household size was 2.75 and the average family size was 3.33.

The median age in the city was 33 years. 31.2% of residents were under the age of 18; 8.5% were between the ages of 18 and 24; 22.7% were from 25 to 44; 27.4% were from 45 to 64; and 10.1% were 65 years of age or older. The gender makeup of the city was 51.2% male and 48.8% female.

=== 2000 census ===
As of the census of 2000, there were 337 people, 122 households, and 92 families residing in the town. The population density was 494.2 inhabitants per square mile (190.8/km^{2}). There were 141 housing units at an average density of 206.8 per square mile (79.8/km^{2}). The racial makeup of the town was 92.28% White, 4.15% Native American, 0.30% Asian, 1.78% from other races, and 1.48% from two or more races. Hispanic or Latino of any race were 2.37% of the population.

There were 122 households, out of which 41.8% had children under the age of 18 living with them, 68.0% were married couples living together, 8.2% had a female householder with no husband present, and 23.8% were non-families. 21.3% of all households were made up of individuals, and 9.0% had someone living alone who was 65 years of age or older. The average household size was 2.76 and the average family size was 3.23.

In the town the population was spread out, with 30.6% under the age of 18, 8.3% from 18 to 24, 30.0% from 25 to 44, 21.7% from 45 to 64, and 9.5% who were 65 years of age or older. The median age was 34 years. For every 100 females, there were 99.4 males. For every 100 females age 18 and over, there were 90.2 males.

The median income for a household in the town was $25,250, and the median income for a family was $33,750. Males had a median income of $28,125 versus $17,292 for females. The per capita income for the town was $11,176. About 8.9% of families and 12.6% of the population were below the poverty line, including 15.1% of those under age 18 and 10.0% of those age 65 or over.

== Education ==
It is in the Hume R-VIII School District. Hume has a preschool, elementary school, and a high school. The mascot for Hume is the Hornets, with red and white as school colors. The elementary school and the high school are accredited by the Missouri Department of Education. In 2023, Hume R-VIII School District was one of 27 schools nationwide to be recognized as an ACAC School of Excellence.

Metropolitan Community College has the Hume school district area in its service area, but not its in-district taxation area.

== History ==
=== Hume area history prior to founding ===
The Hume area prior to the founding of the town was an area bathed in the beauty of nature and heinous Border Wars. Native Americans are thought to have buried their dead in a mound structure approximately one mile north of Hume, although there is no evidence to support this claim. The first known Euro-American settler in the Hume area was Peter Duncan in 1835. The Bleeding Kansas affair and the upcoming Civil War brought John Brown to this area with an attack on the Lawrence farm, five miles south of Hume, in which slaves were freed. Border warfare fighting began soon after, which cost many lives. The Civil War began in 1861, and within a 40-mile radius of Hume, two battles took place: the Battle of Mine Creek and the Battle of Dry Wood Creek. The war came to a head when Order No. 11 was signed by Gen. Thomas Ewing and led to a burning of settlements in the Hume area.

=== Hume's early period 1880-1930 ===
It took many years after Order 11 for the Hume area to recover. A plat was drawn up by Leroy Taylor in 1880 for the town of Howard. Howard was not meant to be, due to the Post Office which had a town of Howard Mills, MO registered, and fearful of confusion, Howard had to change its name. The name, even today, is still debated upon. Tradition is that Hume got its name from a whiskey bottle falling off a train; however on Taylor's original plat, he had a Hume Street drawn on it. The population was about 1,000 at the beginning. Noah Little had to redraw Taylor's Plat and designed the town of Hume. Hume has many catalpa trees, due to a nurseryman in trouble for public intoxication who had to plant the trees as part of his punishment. Two railroads lines used to run through, now only one of these exists to this day. As for celebrations, the Hume Stock Show began in 1905, eventually the Hume Stock Show morphs into the Hume Fair, which exists today. Hume was known for being the White City on the Border due to local journalist Lewis Moore who advocated painting fences white in Hume. Many people did paint their fences white after this campaign.

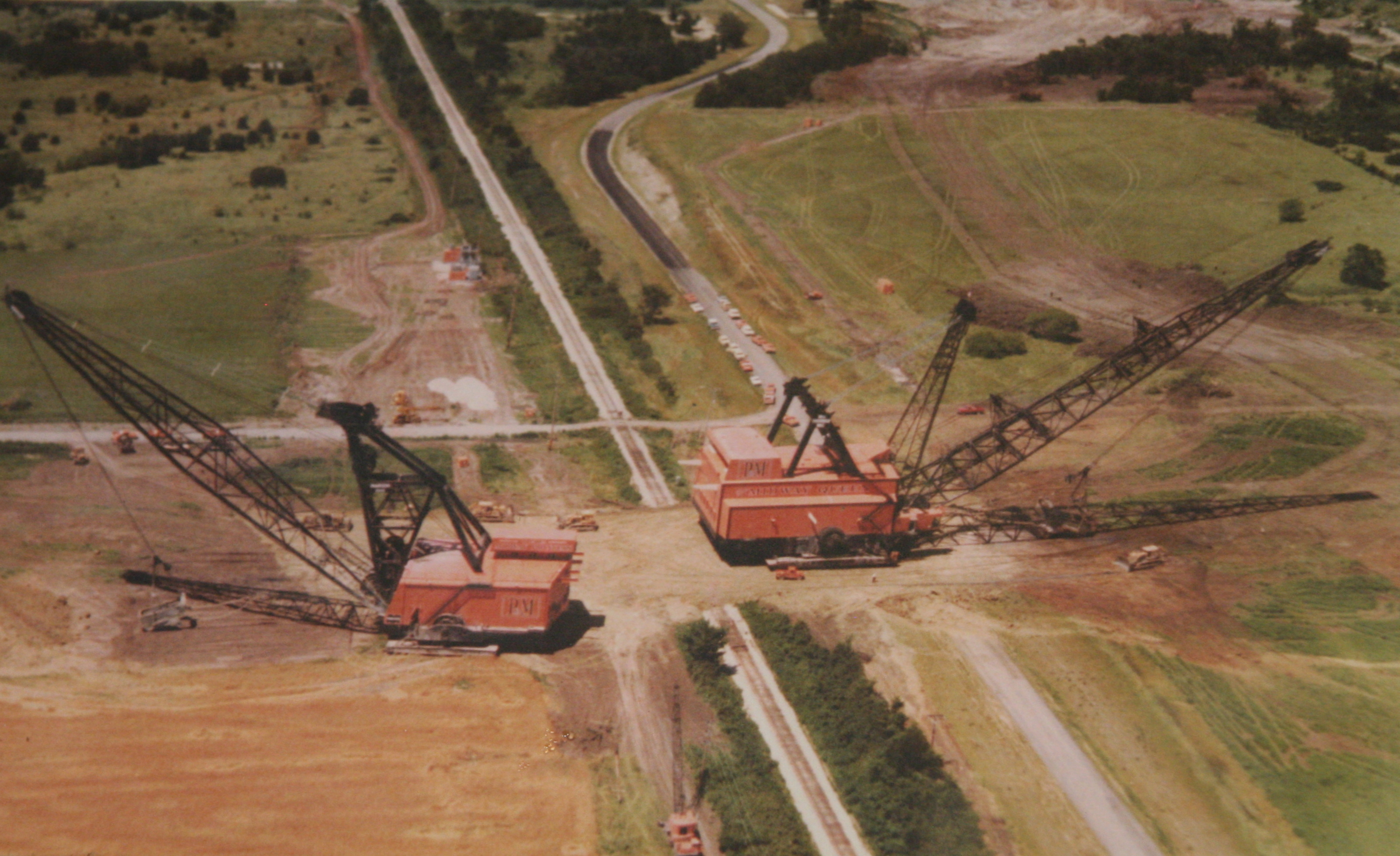
Some of the large equipment used to mine near Hume.

=== Hume peak coal mining period 1930-1950 ===
Hume grew immensely due to the coal mining industry and the population peaked at nearly two thousand or more at the height of coal production. The most prominent coal company in the area was the Hume Sinclair Coal Company. The first public water system was developed in the 1950s. Coal mining did not last past the 1950s and with the closing of coal mines, businesses vanished and people left.

=== Hume after coal, Hume bank scandal ===
The population of Hume reduced to under 200 by the early 1990s. The old Hume high school was demolished in May 1989 and a new high school wing added to the elementary was completed in 1991.

In 2008 nearly one hundred FBI agents and agents of other US departments seized control of the Hume Bank following several reports of embezzlement. Over the course of three days the agents seized banking documents and closed operations of the Hume bank. Soon afterwards Security Bank of neighboring town Rich Hill, Missouri assumed the insured deposits and re-opened the bank as a branch of Security Bank.

The bank scandal in 2008 was completely caused by fiscal mismanagement and embezzlement. In 2009, previous Hume Bank president, Jeffrey W. Thompson, 40, of Hume, Mo., pleaded guilty before U.S. Magistrate Judge Sarah W. Hays to the charges of making false statements to the FDIC as part of a bank fraud scheme that caused such significant losses that the bank was pushed into insolvency. FDIC losses totalled $5,168,580 and total losses were over 6.6 million US dollars.

In 2011 Jeff Thompson was sentenced to six years, six months in Federal prison without the possibility of parole.
