= Crescent Hill =

Crescent Hill may refer to the following:

- Crescent Hill, Louisville - a neighborhood in Louisville, Kentucky
- Crescent Hill (Springfield) - a neighborhood and historic district in Springfield, Massachusetts
- Crescent Hill, Missouri, an unincorporated community
