= Peru, Missouri =

Extinct hamlet in Missouri, U.S.

Peru
- Extinct town
- Interactive map of Peru
- Coordinates: 38.182526°N 94.292172°W
- Country: United States
- State: Missouri
- County: Bates
- Post office established: 1892
- Post office closed: 1901

Peru is an extinct town in Bates County, in the U.S. state of Missouri.

A post office called Peru was established in 1892, and remained in operation until 1901. The community's name may be a transfer from Peru in South America.
