= Miami Creek =

Stream in the US state of Missouri

Miami Creek is a stream in Bates County, Missouri. It is a tributary of the Marais des Cygnes River.

The stream headwaters are a 38°27′56″N 94°35′07″W and the confluence is at 38°08′44″N 94°20′02″W. The source area for the stream lies in the northwest corner of Bates County southeast of Drexel. the stream flows southeast passing under Missouri Route 18 north and east of Merwin. It continues southeast passing southwest of Butler and under U.S. Route 71. It enters the Marais des Cygnes River just north of Missouri Route B about four miles east of Rich Hill.

Miami Creek has the name of the Miami Native American nation.

== See also ==
- List of rivers of Missouri
