= Ballard, Missouri =

Unincorporated community in Missouri, U.S.

Coordinates: 38°21′41″N 94°08′36″W

Ballard is an unincorporated community in northeast Bates County, in the U.S. state of Missouri and is part of the Kansas City metropolitan area.

The community is located on Missouri Route 18 approximately four miles west of the Bates-Henry county line. Adrian on U.S. Route 71 is about ten miles to the west. Tributaries of North Deepwater Creek drain the area to the south.

== History ==
Ballard was named for Hon. J. N. Ballard, a county judge and afterward state senator. A post office was briefly located in Ballard before it was replaced by Rural Free Delivery routes. A 1918 Bates County history reported that the mercantile store in Ballard had a "nice, clean stock of merchandise".

Ballard R-2 School District provides education for the community.
