= Walnut Creek (Marais des Cygnes River tributary) =

River in Missouri, United States

Coordinates: 38°11′41″N 94°28′52″W

Walnut Creek is a stream in Linn County, Kansas and Bates County, Missouri in the United States. It is a tributary of the Marais des Cygnes River.

Walnut Creek was named for the black walnut timber along its course.

== See also ==
- List of rivers of Missouri
