= Coleville, Missouri =

Extinct town in Missouri, United States

Coordinates: 38°24′56″N 94°18′08″W

Coleville is an extinct town in Bates County, in the U.S. state of Missouri. The GNIS classifies it as a populated place.

Coleville was platted in 1859 by Samuel Cole, who gave the community his last name. A post office called Coleville was established in 1871, and remained in operation until 1879.
