= Mound Branch =

Stream in Bates County, Missouri, U.S.

Coordinates: 38.195304°N 94.365784°W

Mound Branch is a stream in Bates County in the U.S. state of Missouri.

Mound Creek owes its name to mounds along its course.

== See also ==
- List of rivers of Missouri
