= Passaic, Missouri =

- Town
- Location of Passaic, Missouri
- Coordinates: 38°19′18″N 94°20′53″W
- Country: United States
- State: Missouri
- County: Bates
- Incorporated: 1965

Area
  - Total: 0.069 sq mi (0.18 km^{2})
  - Land: 0.069 sq mi (0.18 km^{2})
  - Water: 0 sq mi (0.00 km^{2})
- Elevation: 869 ft (265 m)

Population (2020)
  - Total: 26
  - Density: 366.4/sq mi (141.48/km^{2})
- Time zone: UTC-6 (Central (CST))
  - Summer (DST): UTC-5 (CDT)
- ZIP code: 64730
- Area code: 660
- FIPS code: 29-56468
- GNIS feature ID: 2396849

Passaic (/pəˈseɪɪk/ pə-SAY-ik) is a town in Bates County, Missouri, with a population of 26 according to the 2020 census. It is part of the Kansas City metropolitan area within the United States.

== History ==
Passaic was founded in 1891. The city was named after Passaic, New Jersey. A post office called Passaic was established in 1889, and remained in operation until 1983.

== Geography ==
Passaic is located at 38°19′18″N 94°20′53″W (38.321573, -94.348112).

According to the United States Census Bureau, the village has a total area of 0.07 square miles (0.18 km^{2}), all land.

== Demographics ==
Historical population
Census	Pop.	Note	%±
1960	84		—
1970	56		−33.3%
1980	53		−5.4%
1990	40		−24.5%
2000	40		0.0%
2010	34		−15.0%
2020	26		−23.5%
U.S. Decennial Census

=== 2010 census ===
As of the census of 2010, there were 34 people, 12 households, and 8 families living in the village. The population density was 485.7 inhabitants per square mile (187.5/km^{2}). There were 14 housing units at an average density of 200.0 per square mile (77.2/km^{2}). The racial makeup of the village was 100.0% White. Hispanic or Latino of any race were 2.9% of the population.

There were 12 households, of which 25.0% had children under the age of 18 living with them, 50.0% were married couples living together, 16.7% had a male householder with no wife present, and 33.3% were non-families. 33.3% of all households were made up of individuals. The average household size was 2.83 and the average family size was 3.50.

The median age in the village was 41.5 years. 17.6% of residents were under the age of 18; 17.7% were between the ages of 18 and 24; 20.5% were from 25 to 44; 41.2% were from 45 to 64; and 2.9% were 65 years of age or older. The gender makeup of the village was 52.9% male and 47.1% female.

=== 2000 census ===
As of the census of 2000, there were 40 people, 14 households, and 9 families living in the town. The population density was 562.5 inhabitants per square mile (217.2/km^{2}). There were 16 housing units at an average density of 225.0 per square mile (86.9/km^{2}). The racial makeup of the town was 97.50% White and 2.50% Native American. Hispanic or Latino of any race were 7.50% of the population.

There were 14 households, out of which 28.6% had children under the age of 18 living with them, 42.9% were married couples living together, 14.3% had a female householder with no husband present, and 28.6% were non-families. 28.6% of all households were made up of individuals, and 14.3% had someone living alone who was 65 years of age or older. The average household size was 2.86 and the average family size was 3.40.

In the town the population was spread out, with 32.5% under the age of 18, 5.0% from 18 to 24, 27.5% from 25 to 44, 17.5% from 45 to 64, and 17.5% who were 65 years of age or older. The median age was 31 years. For every 100 females there were 90.5 males. For every 100 females age 18 and over, there were 125.0 males.

The median income for a household in the town was $36,250, and the median income for a family was $33,750. Males had a median income of $51,667 versus $11,250 for females. The per capita income for the town was $17,024. There were 30.0% of families and 29.6% of the population living below the poverty line, including 28.0% of under eighteens and none of those over 64.

== Education ==
It is in the Butler R-V School District.

Metropolitan Community College has the Butler school district area in its service area, but not its in-district taxation area.
