= Summit Township, Bates County, Missouri =

Township in the US state of Missouri

Summit Township
- Township
- Location in Bates County
- Coordinates: 38°15′37″N 94°14′21″W
- Country: United States
- State: Missouri
- County: Bates

Area
  - Total: 35.90 sq mi (92.97 km^{2})
  - Land: 35.84 sq mi (92.83 km^{2})
  - Water: 0.054 sq mi (0.14 km^{2}) 0.15%
- Elevation: 935 ft (285 m)

Population (2000)
  - Total: 317
  - Density: 8.8/sq mi (3.4/km^{2})
- Time zone: UTC-6 (CST)
  - Summer (DST): UTC-5 (CDT)
- ZIP code: 64730
- GNIS feature ID: 0766309

Summit Township is one of twenty-four townships in Bates County, Missouri, and is part of the Kansas City metropolitan area within the USA. As of the 2000 census, its population was 317.

Summit Township was so named on account of the relatively elevated prairies within its borders.

== Geography ==
According to the United States Census Bureau, Summit Township covers an area of 35.89 square miles (92.97 square kilometers); of this, 35.84 square miles (92.83 square kilometers, 99.85 percent) is land and 0.05 square miles (0.14 square kilometers, 0.15 percent) is water.

=== Adjacent townships ===
- Shawnee Township (north)
- Spruce Township (northeast)
- Deepwater Township (east)
- Pleasant Gap Township (south)
- Lone Oak Township (southwest)
- Mount Pleasant Township (west)
- Mound Township (northwest)

=== Cemeteries ===
The township contains these two cemeteries: Elizabeth Chapel and Glass.

== School districts ==
- Ballard R-II
- Butler R-V School District

== Political districts ==
- Missouri's 4th congressional district
- State House District 120
- State House District 125
- State Senate District 31
