= Foster, Missouri =

- Village
- Location of Foster, Missouri
- Coordinates: 38°9′56″N 94°30′25″W
- Country: United States
- State: Missouri
- County: Bates
- Incorporated: 1885

Area
  - Total: 0.48 sq mi (1.24 km^{2})
  - Land: 0.47 sq mi (1.23 km^{2})
  - Water: 0.0039 sq mi (0.01 km^{2})
- Elevation: 843 ft (257 m)

Population (2020)
  - Total: 76
  - Density: 160.1/sq mi (61.82/km^{2})
- Time zone: UTC-6 (Central (CST))
  - Summer (DST): UTC-5 (CDT)
- ZIP code: 64745
- Area code: 660
- FIPS code: 29-25372
- GNIS feature ID: 2398906

Foster is a village in Bates County, Missouri, and part of the Kansas City metropolitan area within the United States. The population was 76 at the 2020 census.

== History ==
A post office called Foster has been in operation since 1883. The village was named after Charles Foster, governor of Ohio.

== Geography ==
Foster is located at 38°9′56″N 94°30′25″W (38.165674, -94.507017).

According to the United States Census Bureau, the village has a total area of 0.49 square miles (1.27 km^{2}), all land.

== Demographics ==
Historical population
Census	Pop.	Note	%±
1890	513		—
1900	347		−32.4%
1910	318		−8.4%
1920	344		8.2%
1930	382		11.0%
1940	293		−23.3%
1950	225		−23.2%
1960	153		−32.0%
1970	178		16.3%
1980	175		−1.7%
1990	161		−8.0%
2000	130		−19.3%
2010	117		−10.0%
2020	76		−35.0%
U.S. Decennial Census

=== 2010 census ===
As of the census of 2010, there were 117 people, 46 households, and 35 families living in the village. The population density was 238.8 inhabitants per square mile (92.2/km^{2}). There were 60 housing units at an average density of 122.4 per square mile (47.3/km^{2}). The racial makeup of the village was 98.3% White, 0.9% African American, and 0.9% from two or more races. Hispanic or Latino of any race were 3.4% of the population.

There were 46 households, of which 32.6% had children under the age of 18 living with them, 56.5% were married couples living together, 17.4% had a female householder with no husband present, 2.2% had a male householder with no wife present, and 23.9% were non-families. 21.7% of all households were made up of individuals, and 4.4% had someone living alone who was 65 years of age or older. The average household size was 2.54 and the average family size was 2.89.

The median age in the village was 44.5 years. 24.8% of residents were under the age of 18; 8.5% were between the ages of 18 and 24; 17.9% were from 25 to 44; 35.9% were from 45 to 64; and 12.8% were 65 years of age or older. The gender makeup of the village was 48.7% male and 51.3% female.

=== 2000 census ===
As of the census of 2000, there were 130 people, 52 households, and 34 families living in the village. The population density was 277.5 inhabitants per square mile (107.1/km^{2}). There were 63 housing units at an average density of 134.5 per square mile (51.9/km^{2}). The racial makeup of the village was 96.92% White, 2.31% Native American, and 0.77% from two or more races.

There were 52 households, out of which 42.3% had children under the age of 18 living with them, 61.5% were married couples living together, 1.9% had a female householder with no husband present, and 32.7% were non-families. 32.7% of all households were made up of individuals, and 19.2% had someone living alone who was 65 years of age or older. The average household size was 2.50 and the average family size was 3.23.

In the village, the population was spread out, with 31.5% under the age of 18, 5.4% from 18 to 24, 30.8% from 25 to 44, 20.0% from 45 to 64, and 12.3% who were 65 years of age or older. The median age was 35 years. For every 100 females, there were 120.3 males. For every 100 females age 18 and over, there were 128.2 males.

The median income for a household in the village was $28,750, and the median income for a family was $46,875. Males had a median income of $27,000 versus $17,188 for females. The per capita income for the village was $15,631. There were 6.5% of families and 12.5% of the population living below the poverty line, including 5.2% of under eighteens and 27.3% of those over 64.

== Education ==
It is in the Rich Hill R-IV School District.

Metropolitan Community College has the Rich Hill school district area in its service area, but not its in-district taxation area.
