= Double Branch =

Stream in the US state of Missouri

Double Branch is a stream in Bates County in the U.S. state of Missouri. It is a tributary to the Marais des Cygnes River.

The stream headwaters arise just north of Missouri Route 52 about six miles east-southeast of Butler and the stream flows under Route 52 to the south-southwest. The stream joins the Marais des Cygnes River at the He Bend four miles northeast of Rich Hill.

The headwaters are at 38°12′47″N 94°12′13″W and the confluence is at 38°06′59″N 94°17′40″W.

Double Branch was named for the fact its watercourse has two branches.

== See also ==
- List of rivers of Missouri
