= Spruce, Missouri =

Unincorporated community in Missouri, U.S.

Coordinates: 38°15′59″N 94°08′00″W

Spruce is an unincorporated community in northeast Bates County, in the U.S. state of Missouri. The community is on Missouri Route H approximately ten miles east of Butler. The headwaters of South Deepwater Creek flow past the south side of the community.

Spruce was laid out in 1881, and named after a nearby post office of the same name. The Spruce post office closed in 1957.
