= Burdett, Missouri =

Unincorporated community in Missouri, U.S.

Coordinates: 38°26′01″N 94°28′58″W

Burdett is an unincorporated community in northwest Bates County, in the U.S. state of Missouri. The community is on Missouri Route FF approximately seven miles west northwest of Adrian.

== History ==
Burdett was platted in 1870, and named after Samuel Swinfin Burdett, a state legislator. A post office called Burdett was established in 1870, and remained in operation until 1904.
