= Rockville, Missouri =

- City
- Location of Rockville, Missouri
- Coordinates: 38°4′14″N 94°4′49″W
- Country: United States
- State: Missouri
- County: Bates
- Incorporated: 1884

Area
  - Total: 0.33 sq mi (0.85 km^{2})
  - Land: 0.33 sq mi (0.85 km^{2})
  - Water: 0 sq mi (0.00 km^{2})
- Elevation: 771 ft (235 m)

Population (2020)
  - Total: 135
  - Density: 409.9/sq mi (158.26/km^{2})
- Time zone: UTC-6 (Central (CST))
  - Summer (DST): UTC-5 (CDT)
- ZIP code: 64780
- Area code: 660
- FIPS code: 29-62786
- GNIS feature ID: 2396410

Rockville is a city in Bates County, Missouri, and is part of the Kansas City metropolitan area within the United States. The population was 135 at the 2020 census.

== History ==
Rockville was laid out in 1868. The city was named from local white sandstone quarries. A post office called Rockville has been in operation since 1871.

== Geography ==
Rockville is located at 38°4′14″N 94°4′49″W (38.070435, -94.080404).

According to the United States Census Bureau, the city has a total area of 0.33 square miles (0.85 km^{2}), all land.

The community is in the southeast corner of Bates County approximately 18 miles southeast of Butler and on the north shore of the Harry S Truman Reservoir. Schell City is across the lake and four miles to the southwest in adjacent Vernon County.

== Demographics ==
Historical population
Census	Pop.	Note	%±
1880	315		—
1890	554		75.9%
1900	580		4.7%
1910	566		−2.4%
1920	486		−14.1%
1930	408		−16.0%
1940	336		−17.6%
1950	372		10.7%
1960	255		−31.5%
1970	203		−20.4%
1980	281		38.4%
1990	193		−31.3%
2000	162		−16.1%
2010	166		2.5%
2020	135		−18.7%
U.S. Decennial Census

=== 2010 census ===
As of the census of 2010, there were 166 people, 72 households, and 38 families living in the city. The population density was 503.0 inhabitants per square mile (194.2/km^{2}). There were 103 housing units at an average density of 312.1 per square mile (120.5/km^{2}). The racial makeup of the city was 95.8% White, 0.6% African American, 0.6% Asian, and 3.0% from two or more races. Hispanic or Latino of any race were 2.4% of the population.

There were 72 households, of which 27.8% had children under the age of 18 living with them, 40.3% were married couples living together, 8.3% had a female householder with no husband present, 4.2% had a male householder with no wife present, and 47.2% were non-families. 38.9% of all households were made up of individuals, and 20.8% had someone living alone who was 65 years of age or older. The average household size was 2.31 and the average family size was 3.21.

The median age in the city was 45 years. 23.5% of residents were under the age of 18; 7.1% were between the ages of 18 and 24; 19.2% were from 25 to 44; 33.6% were from 45 to 64; and 16.3% were 65 years of age or older. The gender makeup of the city was 48.8% male and 51.2% female.

=== 2000 census ===
As of the census of 2000, there were 162 people, 77 households, and 39 families living in the city. The population density was 504.8 inhabitants per square mile (194.9/km^{2}). There were 103 housing units at an average density of 320.9 per square mile (123.9/km^{2}). The racial makeup of the city was 97.53% White, 0.62% African American, and 1.85% from two or more races. Hispanic or Latino of any race were 1.85% of the population.

There were 77 households, out of which 20.8% had children under the age of 18 living with them, 37.7% were married couples living together, 7.8% had a female householder with no husband present, and 48.1% were non-families. 41.6% of all households were made up of individuals, and 23.4% had someone living alone who was 65 years of age or older. The average household size was 2.10 and the average family size was 2.83.

In the city the population was spread out, with 19.8% under the age of 18, 5.6% from 18 to 24, 24.1% from 25 to 44, 27.2% from 45 to 64, and 23.5% who were 65 years of age or older. The median age was 46 years. For every 100 females, there were 100.0 males. For every 100 females age 18 and over, there were 106.3 males.

The median income for a household in the city was $19,219, and the median income for a family was $21,250. Males had a median income of $29,583 versus $11,786 for females. The per capita income for the city was $12,730. About 33.3% of families and 32.1% of the population were below the poverty line, including 59.3% of those under the age of eighteen and 16.7% of those 65 or over.

== Education ==
It is in the Appleton City R-II School District.
