= Mayesburg, Missouri =

Unincorporated community in Missouri, U.S.

Coordinates: 38°24′09″N 94°05′10″W

Mayesburg is an unincorporated community in Bates County, in the U.S. state of Missouri.

== History ==
Mayesburg was laid out in 1878, and most likely was named in honor of J. M. Mayes, a local merchant. A post office called Mayesburgh was established in 1879, and remained in operation until 1902.
