= New Home, Missouri =

Unincorporated community in Missouri, U.S.

Coordinates: 38°08′37″N 94°28′21″W

New Home is an unincorporated community in Bates County, in the U.S. state of Missouri.

== History ==
New Home was platted in 1869, and named after a local estate of the same name. A post office called New Home was established in 1872, and remained in operation until 1902.
