= Sprague, Missouri =

Unincorporated community in Missouri, U.S.

Coordinates: 38°05′44″N 94°27′35″W

Sprague is an unincorporated community in southwest Bates County, in the U.S. state of Missouri. The community is five miles west of Rich Hill via Missouri route A and WW. The Harmony Mission Lake Conservation Area lies within one mile to the southeast.

== History ==
A post office called Sprague was established in 1880, and remained in operation until 1926. Some say the community was named after Charles Sprague, a local storekeeper, while others believe the name honors H. C. Sprague, a railroad official.

== Demographics ==
Historical population
Census	Pop.	Note	%±
1900	156		—
1910	156		0.0%
1920	140		−10.3%
1930	57		−59.3%
1940	42		−26.3%
1950	29		−31.0%
Missouri Census Data Center
