= Merwin, Missouri =

- Village
- Location of Merwin, Missouri
- Coordinates: 38°24′18″N 94°35′24″W
- Country: United States
- State: Missouri
- County: Bates
- Incorporated: 1894

Area
  - Total: 0.15 sq mi (0.38 km^{2})
  - Land: 0.15 sq mi (0.38 km^{2})
  - Water: 0 sq mi (0.00 km^{2})
- Elevation: 899 ft (274 m)

Population (2020)
  - Total: 69
  - Density: 469.4/sq mi (181.25/km^{2})
- Time zone: UTC-6 (Central (CST))
  - Summer (DST): UTC-5 (CDT)
- FIPS code: 29-47540
- GNIS feature ID: 2399322

Merwin is a village in Bates County, Missouri, and is part of the Kansas City metropolitan area within the United States. The population was 69 at the 2020 census.

== History ==
Merwin was platted in 1891. The village was named for James G. Merwin, a railroad man. A post office was established at Merwin in 1891, and remained in operation until 1969.

== Geography ==
Merwin is located at 38°24′18″N 94°35′24″W (38.404972, -94.590084).

According to the United States Census Bureau, the village has a total area of 0.15 square miles (0.39 km^{2}), all land.

== Demographics ==
Historical population
| Census | Pop. | Note | %± |
|---|---|---|---|
| 1900 | 250 | | — |
| 1910 | 195 | | −22.0% |
| 1920 | 171 | | −12.3% |
| 1930 | 154 | | −9.9% |
| 1940 | 75 | | −51.3% |
| 1950 | 66 | | −12.0% |
| 1960 | 76 | | 15.2% |
| 1970 | 64 | | −15.8% |
| 1980 | 85 | | 32.8% |
| 1990 | 75 | | −11.8% |
| 2000 | 83 | | 10.7% |
| 2010 | 58 | | −30.1% |
| 2020 | 69 | | 19.0% |
U.S. Decennial Census

=== 2010 census ===
As of the census of 2010, there were 58 people, 25 households, and 16 families living in the village. The population density was 386.7 inhabitants per square mile (149.3/km^{2}). There were 31 housing units at an average density of 206.7 per square mile (79.8/km^{2}). The racial makeup of the village was 96.6% White, 1.7% from other races, and 1.7% from two or more races. Hispanic or Latino of any race were 1.7% of the population.

There were 25 households, of which 28.0% had children under the age of 18 living with them, 40.0% were married couples living together, 12.0% had a female householder with no husband present, 12.0% had a male householder with no wife present, and 36.0% were non-families. 32.0% of all households were made up of individuals, and 8% had someone living alone who was 65 years of age or older. The average household size was 2.32 and the average family size was 2.69.

The median age in the village was 45 years. 24.1% of residents were under the age of 18; 6.8% were between the ages of 18 and 24; 18.9% were from 25 to 44; 29.3% were from 45 to 64; and 20.7% were 65 years of age or older. The gender makeup of the village was 53.4% male and 46.6% female.

=== 2000 census ===
As of the census of 2000, there were 83 people, 32 households, and 22 families living in the village. The population density was 572.7 inhabitants per square mile (221.1/km^{2}). There were 33 housing units at an average density of 227.7 per square mile (87.9/km^{2}). The racial makeup of the village was 87.95% White, and 12.05% from two or more races.

There were 32 households, out of which 43.8% had children under the age of 18 living with them, 56.3% were married couples living together, 9.4% had a female householder with no husband present, and 31.3% were non-families. 28.1% of all households were made up of individuals, and 15.6% had someone living alone who was 65 years of age or older. The average household size was 2.59 and the average family size was 3.14.

In the village, the population was spread out, with 32.5% under the age of 18, 3.6% from 18 to 24, 34.9% from 25 to 44, 19.3% from 45 to 64, and 9.6% who were 65 years of age or older. The median age was 36 years. For every 100 females, there were 112.8 males. For every 100 females age 18 and over, there were 86.7 males.

The median income for a household in the village was $23,125, and the median income for a family was $26,250. Males had a median income of $28,750 versus $23,750 for females. The per capita income for the village was $10,038. There were 23.3% of families and 27.4% of the population living below the poverty line, including 29.2% of under eighteens and 57.1% of those over 64.

== Education ==
It is in the Miami R-I School District.

Metropolitan Community College has the Miami school district area in its service area, but not its in-district taxation area.
