= Worland, Missouri =

Unincorporated community in Missouri, U.S.

Worland
- Unincorporated community
- Interactive map of Worland
- Coordinates: 38°11′16″N 94°35′31″W
- Country: United States
- State: Missouri
- County: Bates County
- Platted: 1888

Worland is an unincorporated community in western Bates County, in the U.S. state of Missouri. The community is on Missouri Route U one mile from the Missouri-Kansas border. Butler is 14 miles to the northeast.

== History ==
Worland was platted in 1888, and named after Harry Worland, who ran a local pharmacy. A post office called Worland was established in 1887, and remained in operation until 1952.

== Demographics ==
Historical population
Census	Pop.	Note	%±
1900	113		—
1910	159		40.7%
1920	132		−17.0%
1930	152		15.2%
1940	115		−24.3%
1950	40		−65.2%
1960	57		42.5%
Missouri Census Data Center
