= Prairie City, Missouri =

Unincorporated community in Missouri, U.S.

Coordinates: 38°04′44″N 94°10′29″W

Prairie City is an unincorporated community in southeast Bates County, in the U.S. state of Missouri. The community is approximately 11.5 miles east of Rich Hill via Missouri routes B and D. The Harry S Truman Reservoir is adjacent to the south.

== History ==
Prairie City was laid out in 1858. The community was named from its scenic setting upon a prairie. A post office was established at Prairie City in 1858, and remained in operation until 1903.
