= Hudson, Missouri =

Unincorporated community in Missouri, U.S.

Coordinates: 38°12′13″N 94°05′25″W

Hudson is an unincorporated community in eastern Bates County, in the U.S. state of Missouri. The community is on a county road just north of Missouri Route 52. The southwest corner of Henry County is one mile to the northeast of the community. Butler is approximately 13 miles to the west-northwest.

== History ==
Hudson was platted in 1867, and named after Henry Hudson. The Hudson post office closed in 1890.
