= Altona, Missouri =

Unincorporated community in Missouri

Coordinates: 38°23′59″N 94°14′06″W

Altona is an unincorporated community in northern Bates County, in the U.S. state of Missouri. The community is on Missouri Route Z just north of Missouri route 18 and approximately 5.5 miles east of Adrian.

== History ==
Altona was platted in 1860, and named after Altoona, Pennsylvania, the native home of a first settler. A post office called Altona was established in 1868, and remained in operation until 1920.

== Demographics ==
Altona was incorporated until the 1950s.

Historical population
Census	Pop.	Note	%±
1900	24		—
1910	67		179.2%
1920	11		−83.6%
1930	21		90.9%
1940	24		14.3%
1950	13		−45.8%
Missouri Census Data Center
