= Dayton Township, Cass County, Missouri =

Township in Cass County, Missouri, U.S.

Coordinates: 38.5056°N 94.2047°W

Dayton Township is an inactive township in Cass County, in the U.S. state of Missouri.

Dayton Township was originally called Page Township; the present name is after the community of Dayton, Missouri.
