= Bacon Township, Vernon County, Missouri =

Inactive township in the U.S. state of Missouri

Coordinates: 37°59′19″N 94°07′08″W

Bacon Township is a township in Vernon County, in the U.S. state of Missouri.

Bacon Township was erected in 1856, taking its name from James Bacon, a pioneer citizen.
