= Nyhart, Missouri =

Unincorporated community in Missouri, U.S.

Coordinates: 38°12′15″N 94°26′01″W

Nyhart is an unincorporated community in Bates County, in the U.S. state of Missouri.

== History ==
A post office was established at Nyhart in 1886, and remained in operation until 1908. The community has the name of Noah Nyhart, an early settler.
