= Deepwater Township, Henry County, Missouri =

Township in the American state of Missouri

Coordinates: 38.2568252°N 94.0182521°W

Deepwater Township is a township in Henry County, in the U.S. state of Missouri.

Deepwater Township was established in 1840, taking its name from Deepwater Creek.
