= Appleton Township, St. Clair County, Missouri =

Inactive township in the US state of Missouri

Coordinates: 38.1533°N 94.0067°W

Appleton Township is an inactive township in St. Clair County, in the U.S. state of Missouri.

Appleton Township was erected in 1880, taking its name from the community of Appleton City, Missouri.
