= Crescent Hill, Missouri =

Unincorporated community in Missouri, U.S.

Coordinates: 38°25′56″N 94°20′51″W

Crescent Hill is an unincorporated community in Bates County, in the U.S. state of Missouri.

== History ==
A post office called Crescent Hill was established in 1858 and remained in operation until 1880. The community was named for its lofty elevation atop Crescent Hill.
