= Pleasant Gap, Missouri =

Unincorporated community in Missouri, U.S.

Coordinates: 38°10′22″N 94°10′56″W

Pleasant Gap is an unincorporated community in southeastern Bates County, in the U.S. state of Missouri. The community is on Missouri Route 0 approximately ten miles southeast of Butler.

== History ==
Pleasant Gap was laid out in about 1840. It was so named from its scenic setting in a gap. A post office called Pleasant Gap was established in 1840, and remained in operation until 1918.
