= White Oak Township, Henry County, Missouri =

Township in the American state of Missouri

Coordinates: 38.4257°N 94.0000°W

White Oak Township is a township in Henry County, in the U.S. state of Missouri.

White Oak Township was established in 1868, taking its name from White Oak Creek.
