= Virginia, Missouri =

Unincorporated Community in Bates County, Missouri

Coordinates: 38°16′01″N 94°29′45″W

Virginia is an unincorporated community in Bates County, in the U.S. state of Missouri.

== History ==
Virginia was platted in 1871, and named after Virginia, the native home of a share of the first settlers. A post office was established at Virginia in 1871, and remained in operation until 1906.
