= Blue Mound Township, Vernon County, Missouri =

Township in the US state of Missouri

Coordinates: 37.9892°N 94.2214°W

Blue Mound Township is a township in Vernon County, in the U.S. state of Missouri.

Blue Mound Township takes its name from the summit of the same name within its borders.
