= Walker Township, Henry County, Missouri =

Township in Henry County, Missouri, U.S.

Coordinates: 38.36°N 94.00°W

Walker Township is a township in Henry County, in the U.S. state of Missouri.

Walker Township was established in 1873, taking its name from Calvin Edward Walker, a pioneer citizen.
