= Austin Township, Cass County, Missouri =

Inactive township in the US state of Missouri

Coordinates: 38.5156°N 94.3206°W

Austin Township is an inactive township in Cass County, in the U.S. state of Missouri.

Austin Township was established in 1872, taking its name from the community of Austin, Missouri.
