= Adrian, Missouri =

- City
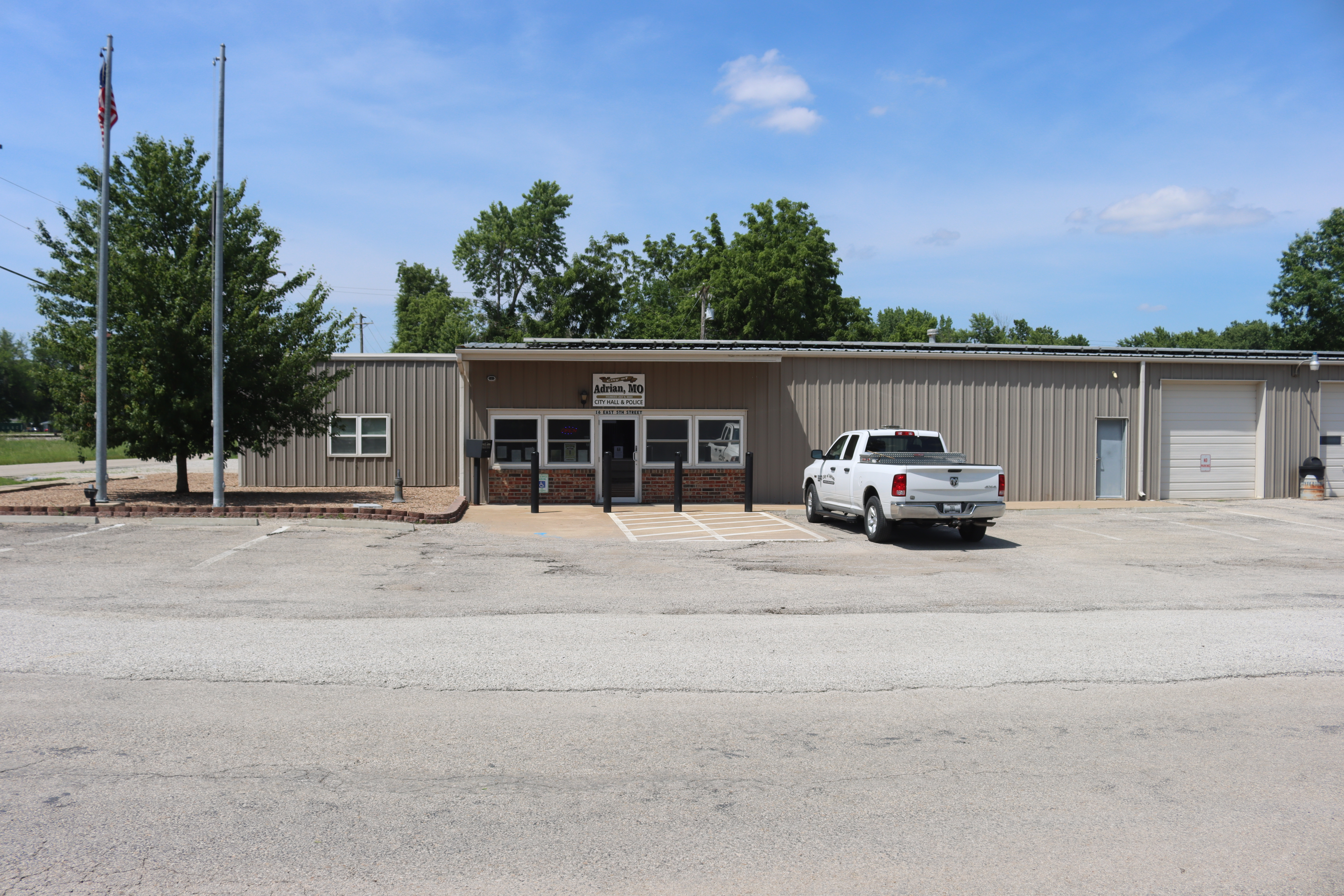
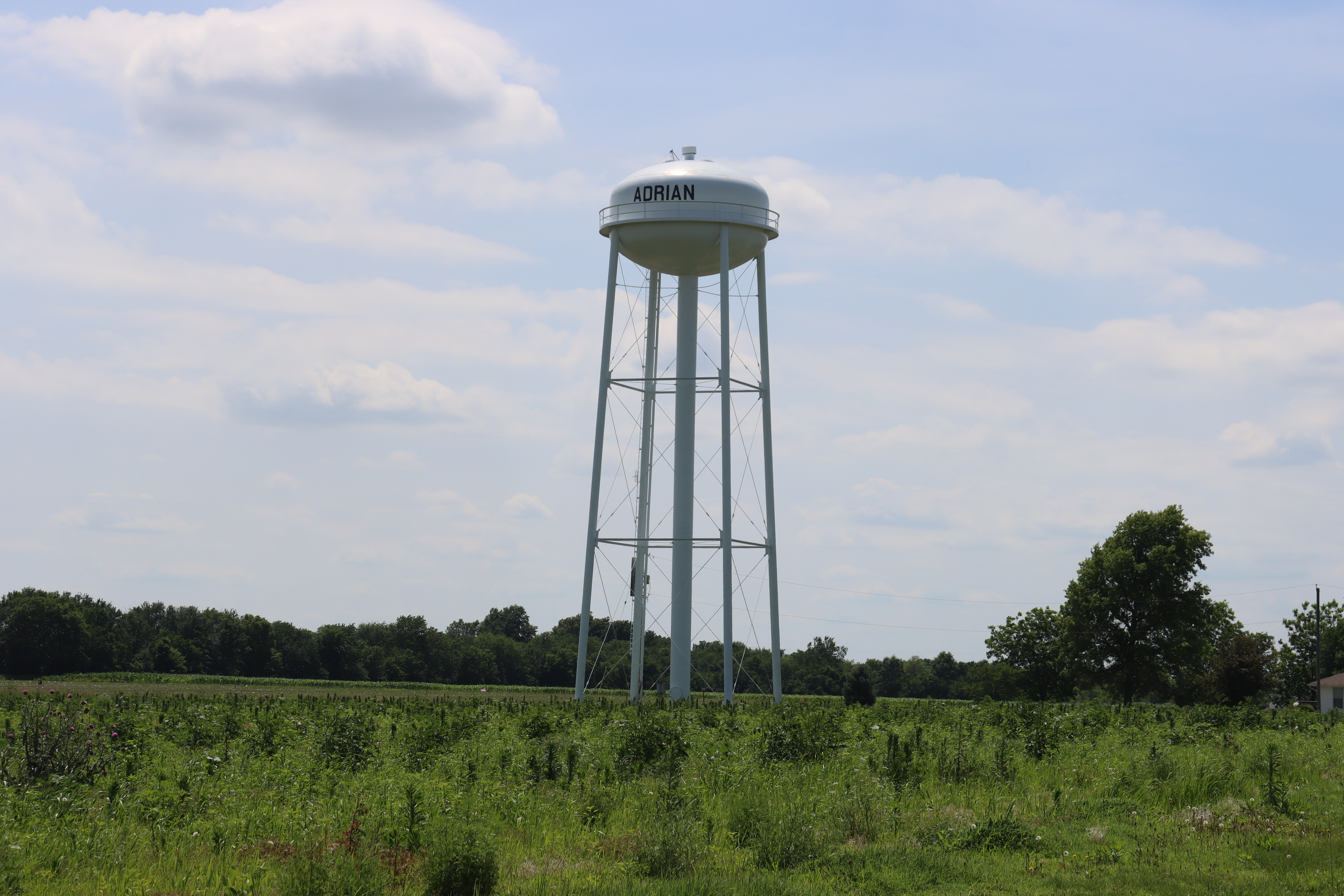
- City Hall Adrian Water Tower

- Logo
- Nickname: Purple martin capital of the state of Missouri
- Motto(s): "Strong Roots, Growing Branches"
- Location of Adrian, Missouri
- Coordinates: 38°23′40″N 94°20′36″W
- Country: United States
- State: Missouri
- County: Bates
- Incorporated: 1880

Area
  - Total: 1.76 sq mi (4.55 km^{2})
  - Land: 1.67 sq mi (4.33 km^{2})
  - Water: 0.081 sq mi (0.21 km^{2})
- Elevation: 846 ft (258 m)

Population (2020)
  - Total: 1,730
  - Density: 1,033.7/sq mi (399.12/km^{2})
- Time zone: UTC-6 (Central (CST))
  - Summer (DST): UTC-5 (CDT)
- ZIP code: 64720
- Area code: 816
- FIPS code: 29-00244
- GNIS feature ID: 2393885
- Website: cityofadrianmo.org

Adrian is a city in northern Bates County, Missouri, United States. It is part of the Kansas City metropolitan area. Its population was 1,730 at the 2020 census.

== History ==
Adrian was platted in 1880 when the Missouri Pacific Railroad was extended to that point. Some say the city was named by settlers who hailed from Adrian, Michigan, while others believe the city was named after Adrian Talmadge, the son of a railroad official. A post office has been in operation at Adrian since 1880.

== Geography ==
Adrian is located on Missouri Route 18 adjacent to the west side of US Route 71. Butler is about 9 mi (14 km) to the south. The community of Archie in southern Cass County is 5.5 mi to the north.

According to the United States Census Bureau, the city has a total area of 2.18 square miles (5.65 km^{2}), of which 0.09 sq mi (0.23 km^{2}) is covered by water.

== Demographics ==
Historical population
Census	Pop.	Note	%±
1890	613		—
1900	629		2.6%
1910	929		47.7%
1920	955		2.8%
1930	934		−2.2%
1940	868		−7.1%
1950	905		4.3%
1960	1,082		19.6%
1970	1,259		16.4%
1980	1,484		17.9%
1990	1,582		6.6%
2000	1,780		12.5%
2010	1,677		−5.8%
2020	1,730		3.2%
U.S. Decennial Census

=== 2020 census ===
As of the 2020 census, Adrian had a population of 1,730. The median age was 42.3 years. 20.8% of residents were under the age of 18 and 22.4% of residents were 65 years of age or older. For every 100 females there were 84.8 males, and for every 100 females age 18 and over there were 80.0 males age 18 and over.

0.0% of residents lived in urban areas, while 100.0% lived in rural areas.

There were 710 households in Adrian, of which 26.9% had children under the age of 18 living in them. Of all households, 43.7% were married-couple households, 16.6% were households with a male householder and no spouse or partner present, and 32.5% were households with a female householder and no spouse or partner present. About 32.3% of all households were made up of individuals and 16.6% had someone living alone who was 65 years of age or older.

There were 785 housing units, of which 9.6% were vacant. The homeowner vacancy rate was 1.9% and the rental vacancy rate was 8.5%.

Racial composition as of the 2020 census
Race	Number	Percent
White	1,662	96.1%
Black or African American	8	0.5%
American Indian and Alaska Native	4	0.2%
Asian	2	0.1%
Native Hawaiian and Other Pacific Islander	0	0.0%
Some other race	9	0.5%
Two or more races	45	2.6%
Hispanic or Latino (of any race)	20	1.2%

=== 2010 census ===
As of the census of 2010, 1,677 people, 685 households, and 430 families were living in the city. The population density was 802.4 inhabitants per square mile (309.8/km^{2}). The 782 housing units had an average density of 374.2 per square mile (144.5/km^{2}). The racial makeup of the city was 98.2% White, 0.2% African American, 0.5% Native American, 0.2% from other races, and 1.0% from two or more races. Hispanics or Latinos of any race were 0.7% of the population.

Of the 685 households, 33.9% had children under 18 living with them, 47.9% were married couples living together, 10.2% had a female householder with no husband present, 4.7% had a male householder with no wife present, and 37.2% were not families. About 32.7% of all households were made up of individuals, and 19.1% had someone living alone who was 65or older. The average household size was 2.34 and the average family size was 2.99.

The median age in the city was 40.3 years. The age distribution was 25.6% under 18, 6.7% from 18 and 24, 22.9% from 25 to 44; 25% from 45 to 64, and 19.8% were 65 or older. The gender makeup of the city was 46.3% male and 53.7% female.

=== 2000 census ===
As of the census of 2000, 1,780 people, 682 households, and 469 families resided in the city. The population density was 953.6 inhabitants per square mile (368.2/km^{2}). The 734 housing units had an average density of 393.2 per square mile (151.8/km^{2}). The racial makeup of the city was 98.65% White, 0.39% Native American, 0.17% Asian, 0.06% Pacific Islander, 0.11% from other races, and 0.62% from two or more races. Hispanics or Latinos of any race were 1.01% of the population.

Of the 682 households, 34.8% had children under 18 living with them, 57.6% were married couples living together, 9.1% had a female householder with no husband present, and 31.1% were not families. About 28.4% of all households were made up of individuals, and 17.3% had someone living alone who was 65 or older. The average household size was 2.51 and the average family size was 3.07.

In the city, the age distribution was 26.6% under 18, 8.7% from 18 to 24, 26.9% from 25 to 44, 17.3% from 45 to 64, and 20.5% who were 65 or older. The median age was 37 years. For every 100 females, there were 90.2 males. For every 100 females 18 and over, there were 80.6 males.

The median income for a household in the city was $31,436, and for a family was $39,125. Males had a median income of $32,798 versus $22,727 for females. The per capita income for the city was $15,856. About 10.7% of families and 12.8% of the population were below the poverty line, including 19.8% of those under 18 and 10.0% of those 65 or over.

== Attractions ==
Adrian's Frontier Village is the site of the annual Western Missouri Antique Tractor and Machinery Association Gas and Steam Engine Show.

== Education ==
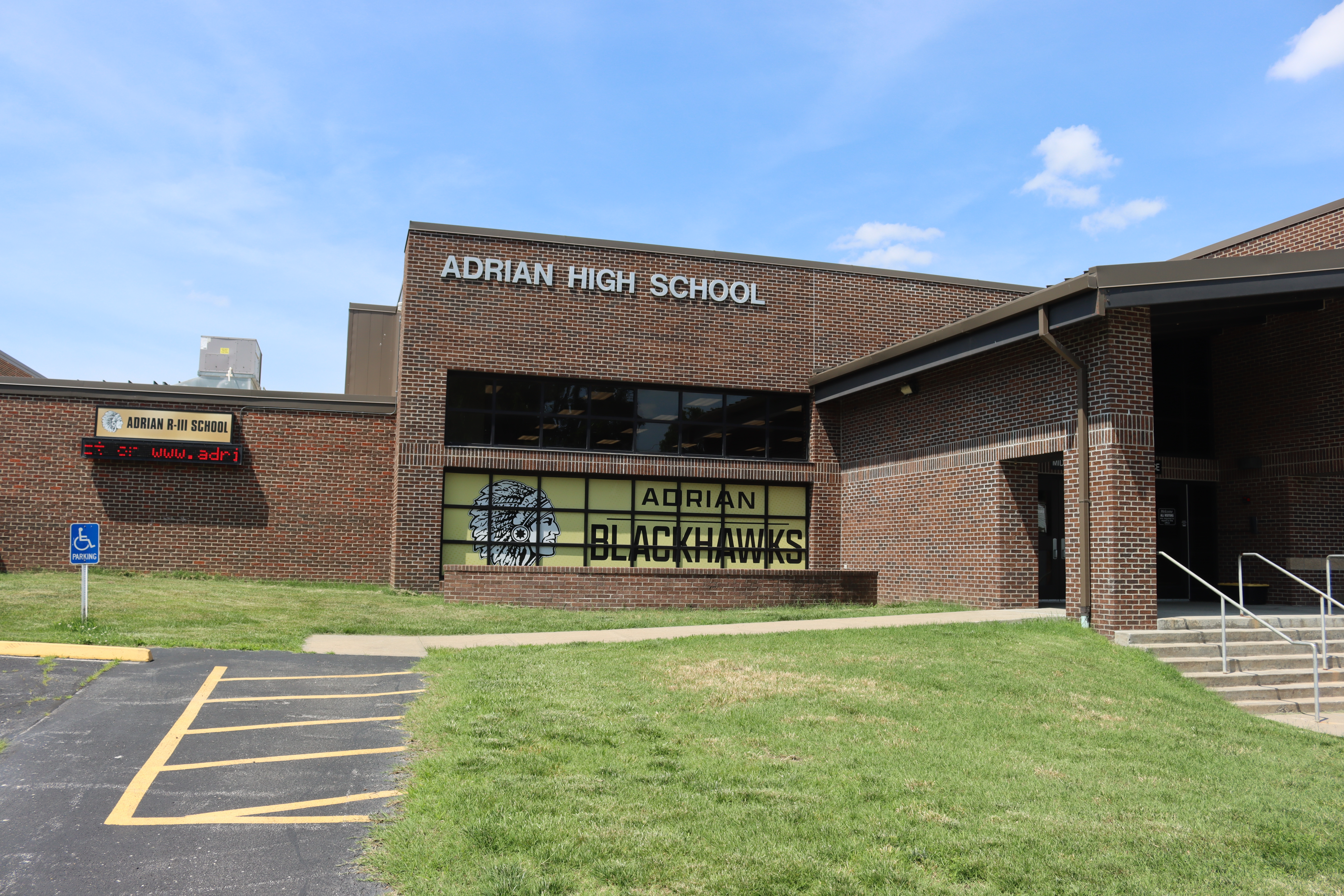
Adrian High School

Adrian public schools are part of the Adrian R-III School District. Schools in the district include Adrian Elementary School, prekindergarten through fifth grade, and Adrian Jr./Sr. High School, grades 6 through 12. Don Lile is the superintendent of schools.

The school mascot is the Blackhawk. The 2002 and 2024 Blackhawk football teams won Missouri's Class One championship. In 1984 and 1992, Adrian won the Boys' Missouri Class 1A championship in track and field. The Blackhawks also won the 1994 Girls Class 2A championship in track and field. In 2016, the varsity girls' basketball finished second in the state.

Metropolitan Community College has the Adrian school district area in its service area, but not its in-district taxation area.

== Media ==
Newspapers

The Adrian Journal was published from 1889 to February 2015.

== Notable people ==
- John Cowdery, Alaska politician
- Howard Maple, professional baseball athlete
- Randy Pike, former Missouri state legislator
