= Adrian R-III School District =

School district in Missouri, U.S.

Address
- 601 N Houston Adrian, Bates County, Missouri, 64720; United States

District information
- Grades: PreK-12
- Superintendent: Mr. Don Lile

Students and staff
- Enrollment: 767
- Faculty: -
- District mascot: Adrian Blackhawks
- Colors: Black & Gold

Other information
- Website: Adrian R-III School District

The Adrian R-III School District is a public school district in Bates County, Missouri, United States, based in Adrian, Missouri.

== Schools ==
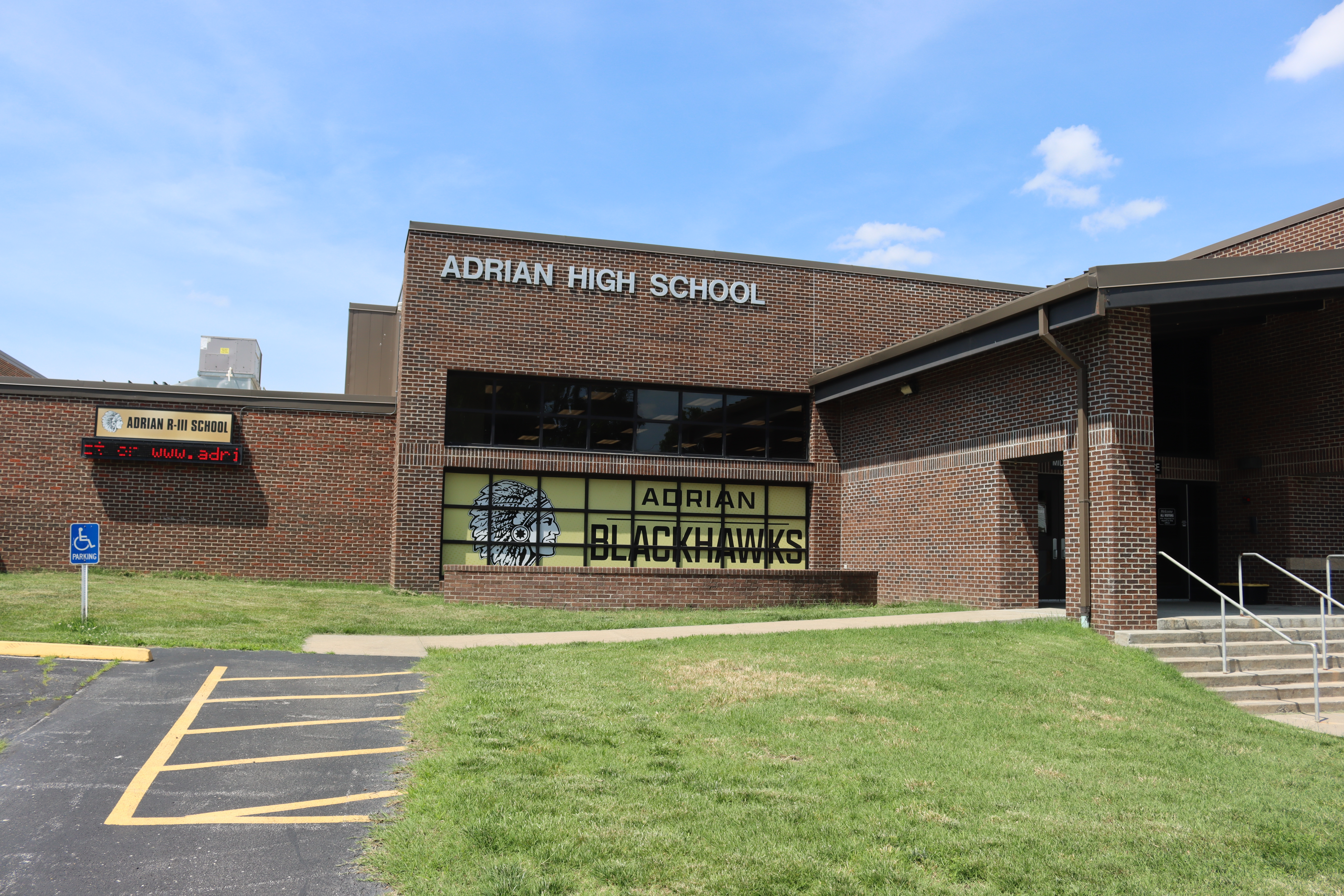
Adrian High School

The Adrian R-III School District has one elementary school and one middle school/high school.

=== Adrian Elementary School ===
- Serves Grades PK-5

=== Adrian Jr./Sr. High School ===
- Serves Grades 6-12
