= Metropolitan Community College (Missouri) =

Public college system in Missouri, US

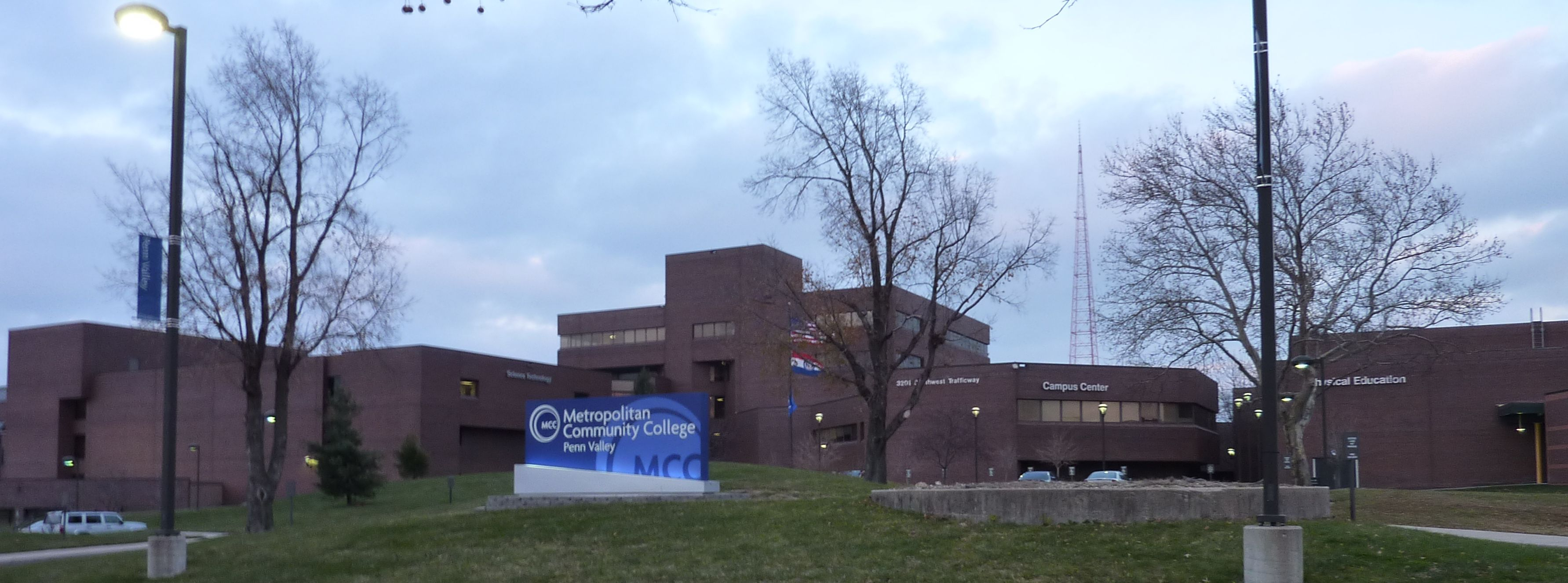
- Penn Valley campus
- Former names: Kansas City Polytechnic Institute; Junior College of Kansas City; Blue River Community College; Longview Community College; Maple Woods Community College; Penn Valley Community College
- Type: Public community college
- Established: 1915 (as Kansas City Polytechnic Institute)
- Accreditation: Higher Learning Commission
- Endowment: $10.25 million (2024)
- Budget: $123.1 million (2023-24)
- Chancellor: Kimberly Beatty
- Vice-Chancellor: John M. Chawana
- Total staff: 1,000
- Students: 13,178 (2023)
- Location: Missouri, United States
- Campus: 550 acres (220 ha) (total)
- Language: English
- Colors: Royal blue and white
- Nickname: Wolves
- Website: mcckc.edu

Metropolitan Community College (MCC or MCCKC) is a public community college system in the U.S. state of Missouri. The system consists of four physical campuses in Kansas City, Independence, and Lee's Summit, as well as the MCC-Online campus. The campuses had a total enrollment of 14,507 for the fall semester of 2025. The college's athletic teams are known as the Wolves. It is not affiliated with Metropolitan Community College in Omaha, Nebraska.

== History ==
MCC is the oldest public college in Kansas City, Missouri, and the first community college established in the state of Missouri. It was founded in 1915 as Kansas City Polytechnic Institute, with its campus at 11th and Locust streets initially offering a junior college program, a teacher training school, a high school, a mechanic arts school, a trade school, and a business training school. As a junior college, it was one of the first institutions in the country to issue two-year associate degrees, and it was the third school in the country to be accredited by the North Central Association of Colleges and Schools, in 1918. It changed its name to Junior College of Kansas City in 1919.

In 1964 the suburban school districts of Belton, Center, Grandview, Hickman Mills, Lee's Summit, North Kansas City, and Raytown joined the Kansas City district to form the Metropolitan Community College District. A Board of Trustees was publicly elected to take over fiduciary responsibility for the college from the Kansas City School District. Patrons of the Blue Springs, Park Hill, Independence, and Fort Osage school districts voted to join the college district in the 1980s and 1990s. In 2021, three more school districts voted to "attach" to the MCC district: Grain Valley, Liberty, and Oak Grove. That brought the number of K-12 school systems that are "in district" with MCC to 15.

The Longview, Maple Woods, and Penn Valley campuses opened for the 1969-70 academic year, although campus construction would continue for years afterward. Some Maple Woods classes, for instance, met in a church that first year. The Blue River campus in eastern Jackson County opened in 1997, and the Business & Technology campus near Interstate 435 and Front Street opened in 2002. The entire institution became known as Metropolitan Community College, instead of the plural Metropolitan Community Colleges, in 2005. The Business & Technology campus closed at the end of 2021, with its skilled trades programs relocating to three new facilities: the Engineering Technology building and Advanced Technical Skills Institute, both part of MCC-Penn Valley, and the Blue River East building east of the main MCC-Blue River campus in Independence.

== Campuses ==
MCC campus locations in Missouri

Prior to the consolidation of the Metropolitan name the campuses had their own local names (e.g., Longview Community College, Maple Woods Community College, Penn Valley Community College). Today, each campus is recognized by the college's moniker MCC and the campus name:

- MCC-Blue River campus is in Independence, Missouri. The campus opened in 1997. As of fall 2025, the campus serves about 2,154 students per semester. In addition to a host of general education programs, MCC-Blue River is home to a well-regarded cybersecurity program. The Metropolitan Chorale of Kansas City is based at Blue River. Each spring, families descend on the campus for the annual All for the Children healthy families resource fair, which includes a massive candy egg hunt. The campus' Public Safety Institute trains peace officers, firefighters, and EMT-paramedics. MCC-Blue River is also home base for MCC's men's and women's soccer teams.
- MCC-Longview is located in Lee's Summit, Missouri. It opened in 1969. In 2001, MCC-Longview was selected as a TIME magazine/The Princeton Review "College of the Year" in recognition of its Writing Across the Curriculum program. Jackson County (Missouri) Executive and former Kansas City Royals great Frank White is a notable campus alumnus. In the fall of 2025, the campus served about 3,390 students. The campus includes a nationally known automotive technology program and the MCC-Longview Cultural Arts Center. Each spring since 2006, MCC-Longview invites the community to take part in its popular Flights of Fancy Mega Kite Festival. MCC-Longview's baseball team won the 2007 NJCAA Division II Baseball Championship. MCC Wolves sports programs based at Longview: men's and women's golf and cross country, and women's volleyball.
- MCC-Maple Woods was founded in 1969. Located in Kansas City's Northland, the campus is known for its veterinary technology, geographic information systems and foreign language interpreting programs. A new building, the Agriculture Annex, was slated to break ground in April 2024, with completion by end of the year. This northernmost MCC campus served about 4,123 students in Fall 2025. MCC Wolves sports teams based at Maple Woods are baseball and softball. Albert Pujols played baseball for Maple Woods (when its sports teams were known as the Monarchs) before being drafted by the St. Louis Cardinals in 1999. Maple Woods' Sports Training Center was recently expanded and is now home to the campus Fitness Center.
- MCC-Penn Valley, near Penn Valley Park, was founded in 1969. Located in midtown Kansas City, the campus is known for its Health Science Institute at 3444 Broadway, home to nursing and allied health programs and the Virtual Hospital; the English as a Second Language program; and the new Advanced Technical Skills Institute at 2944 Troost Ave. The campus is also home to the Francis Child Development Institute and the Carter Art Center. About 3,914 students were enrolled at MCC-Penn Valley in Fall 2025. Each September, MCC-Penn Valley welcomes the community to its free Jazz in the Valley festival. MCC-Penn Valley is home base for MCC's men's and women's basketball programs. The men's basketball team, then known as the Scouts, won the 1996 NJCAA Men's Division II Basketball Championship and was runner-up in 1997 and 2002. In 1991, Penn Valley hosted the seventh Science Olympiad National Tournament.

== Notable alumni ==
- Edward F. Arn, Kansas governor
- William M. Boyle, Democratic National Committee chairman
- George H. Clay, president of Kansas City Federal Reserve
- Blevins Davis, theatrical producer
- David F. Duncan, drug policy advisor to President Bill Clinton; professor at Brown University
- S. George Ellsworth, LDS historian
- Jack Gentry (entrepreneur), founder of Positronic
- Robert A. Heinlein, science fiction author (1925)
- Clay Johnson, basketball player
- Ewing Marion Kauffman, founder of Marion Laboratories, original owner of the Kansas City Royals, and philanthropist
- Brent Lasater, Republican member of the Missouri House of Representatives
- Robert L. J. Long, four-star admiral
- Logan Morrison, baseball player
- Dale D. Myers, NASA administrator
- Irene C. Peden, engineer who was the first woman to live and work in interior Antarctica
- Albert Pujols, baseball player
- Casey Stengel, baseball player and manager
- Maxwell D. Taylor, United States Army officer and diplomat
- Mort Walker, creator of Beetle Bailey cartoon (1942)
- Charles Wheeler (politician), Kansas City mayor
- Frank White, baseball player and coach
- Brian C. Wimes, federal judge
- Ann Woodward, socialite, showgirl, radio actress
