= Bates County, Missouri =

County in Missouri, United States

- County
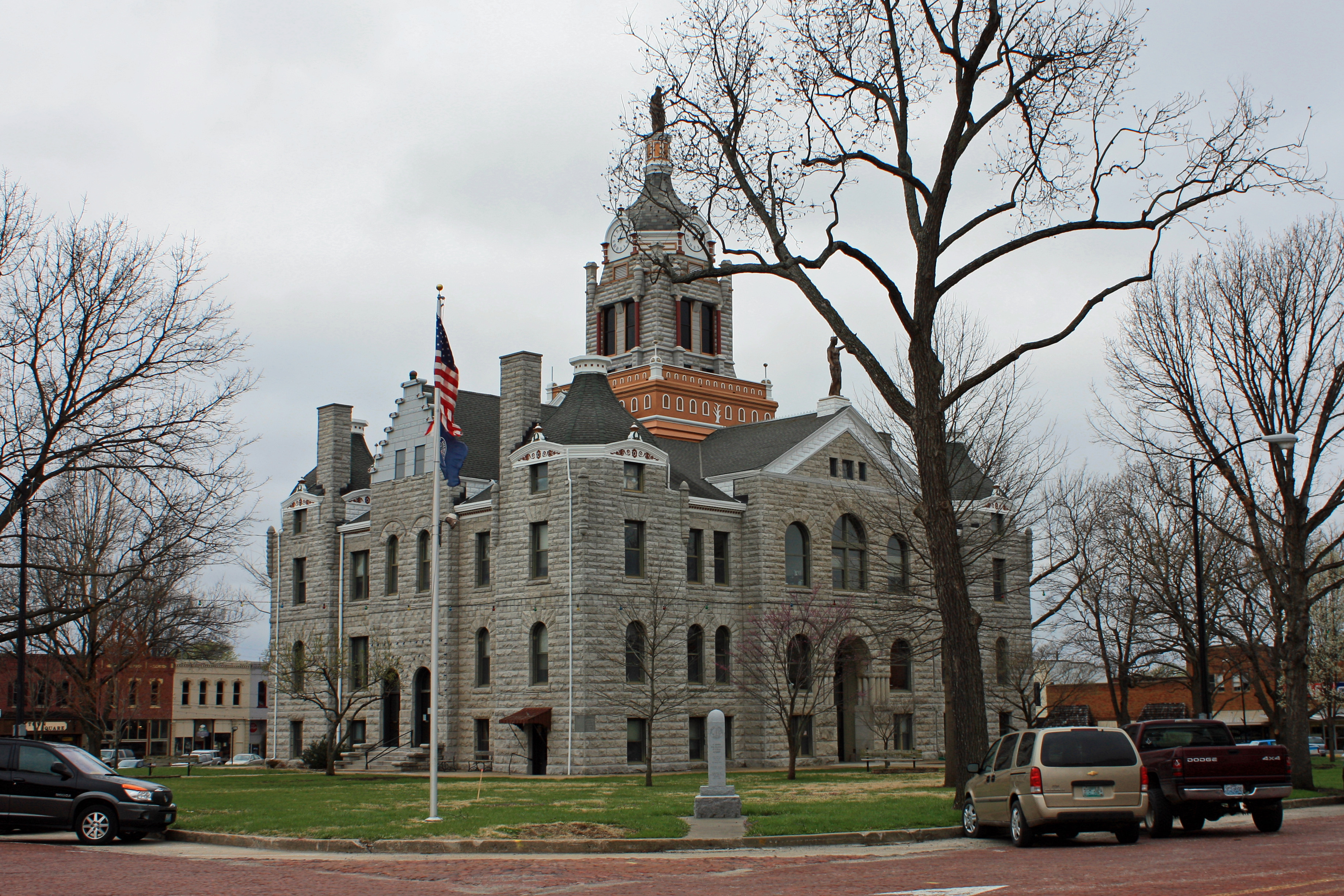
- Bates County Courthouse in Butler

- Location within the U.S. state of Missouri
- Coordinates: 38°16′N 94°20′W
- Country: United States
- State: Missouri
- Founded: January 29, 1841
- Named for: Frederick Bates
- Seat: Butler
- Largest city: Butler

Area
  - Total: 851 sq mi (2,200 km^{2})
  - Land: 837 sq mi (2,170 km^{2})
  - Water: 15 sq mi (39 km^{2}) 1.7%

Population (2020)
  - Total: 16,042
  - Estimate (2025): 16,512 ▲
  - Density: 19.2/sq mi (7.40/km^{2})
- Time zone: UTC−6 (Central)
  - Summer (DST): UTC−5 (CDT)
- Congressional district: 4th
- Website: www.batescounty.net

Bates County is a county located in the west central part of the U.S. state of Missouri, two counties south of the Missouri River and is part of the Kansas City metropolitan area. As of the 2020 census, the population was 16,042. Its county seat is Butler. The county was organized in 1841 and named after Frederick Bates, the second Governor of Missouri.

This mostly rural county has an overwhelmingly ethnic European-American population, which has declined in number since the early 20th century as people have moved to cities.

== History ==
The borderlands of Kansas and Missouri were battlegrounds for insurgents during the American Civil War, with raids going back and forth across the border. Bates County is noted as the site for the first combat engagement during the war of African-American soldiers serving with the Union and against Confederate forces, which occurred on October 28–29, 1862. The First Kansas Colored Division (part of the state militia) fought Confederate guerrillas at the Battle of Island Mound four miles north of present-day Rich Hill, Missouri, and the Union forces won.

The Kansas soldiers were badly outnumbered but stood their ground, fighting valiantly. The skirmish was covered by The New York Times, which noted the men's bravery at a time when many people questioned whether former slaves could make good soldiers. Their heroic action preceded President Abraham Lincoln's announcement of the Emancipation Proclamation in January 1863 and establishment of the United States Colored Troops.

Following a massacre of men and boys and the burning of Lawrence, Kansas, by Confederate bushwhackers in the summer of 1863, the United States General Ewing ordered the evacuation of the civilian population from rural areas of Bates and nearby counties except for within a mile of certain Union-controlled cities, in order to cut off sources of support for Confederate insurgents. This was done under Order No. 11. The county had been a base of Confederate guerrillas. But, Ewing's order generated outrage and added to support of guerrillas in some areas.

This mostly rural county continued to support agriculture in the decades after the Civil War. Since the early 20th century, population has declined as people have moved to cities for work.

== Legacy and honors ==
- A statue commemorating the Battle of Island Mound was installed on the north lawn of the county courthouse in Butler, seven miles from the skirmish site.
- The skirmish area has been preserved since 2012 as the Battle of Island Mound State Historic Site, and its historic prairie is being restored.
- The Battle of Island Mound (2014) is a short documentary film made in cooperation with the Missouri Department of Natural Resources; it won two Emmy Awards in 2015 for historic documentary and cinematography.

== Geography ==
According to the U.S. Census Bureau, the county has a total area of 851 square miles (2,200 km^{2}), of which 837 square miles (2,170 km^{2}) is land and 15 square miles (39 km^{2}) (1.7%) is water.

=== Adjacent counties ===
- Cass County (north)
- Henry County (northeast)
- St. Clair County (southeast)
- Vernon County (south)
- Linn County, Kansas (west)
- Miami County, Kansas (northwest)

=== Major highways ===
- Interstate 49
- U.S. Route 71
- Route 18
- Route 52

=== Transit ===
- Jefferson Lines

== Demographics ==
Historical population
Census	Pop.	Note	%±
1850	3,669		—
1860	7,215		96.6%
1870	15,960		121.2%
1880	25,381		59.0%
1890	32,223		27.0%
1900	30,141		−6.5%
1910	25,869		−14.2%
1920	23,933		−7.5%
1930	22,068		−7.8%
1940	19,531		−11.5%
1950	17,534		−10.2%
1960	15,905		−9.3%
1970	15,468		−2.7%
1980	15,873		2.6%
1990	15,025		−5.3%
2000	16,653		10.8%
2010	17,049		2.4%
2020	16,042		−5.9%
2025 (est.)	16,512	▲	2.9%
U.S. Decennial Census; 1790-1960 1900-1990; 1990-2000 2010-2020

=== 2020 census ===
Bates County, Missouri – Racial and ethnic composition Note: the US Census treats Hispanic/Latino as an ethnic category. This table excludes Latinos from the racial categories and assigns them to a separate category. Hispanics/Latinos may be of any race.
Race / Ethnicity (NH = Non-Hispanic)	Pop 1980	Pop 1990	Pop 2000	Pop 2010	Pop 2020	% 1980	% 1990	% 2000	% 2010	% 2020
White alone (NH)	15,611	14,756	16,114	16,296	14,799	98.35%	98.21%	96.76%	95.58%	92.25%
Black or African American alone (NH)	121	107	101	143	155	0.76%	0.71%	0.61%	0.84%	0.97%
Native American or Alaska Native alone (NH)	43	69	89	94	92	0.27%	0.46%	0.53%	0.55%	0.57%
Asian alone (NH)	18	8	22	27	48	0.11%	0.05%	0.13%	0.16%	0.30%
Native Hawaiian or Pacific Islander alone (NH)	x	x	2	2	9	x	x	0.01%	0.01%	0.06%
Other race alone (NH)	11	3	5	5	21	0.07%	0.02%	0.03%	0.03%	0.13%
Mixed race or Multiracial (NH)	x	x	141	207	583	x	x	0.85%	1.21%	3.63%
Hispanic or Latino (any race)	69	82	179	275	335	0.43%	0.55%	1.07%	1.61%	2.09%
Total	15,873	15,025	16,653	17,049	16,042	100.00%	100.00%	100.00%	100.00%	100.00%

As of the 2020 census, the county had a population of 16,042. The median age was 42.3 years. 22.9% of residents were under the age of 18 and 20.6% of residents were 65 years of age or older. For every 100 females there were 98.4 males, and for every 100 females age 18 and over there were 96.6 males age 18 and over. 0.0% of residents lived in urban areas, while 100.0% lived in rural areas.

The racial makeup of the county was 92.3% White (non-Hispanic alone), 1.0% Black or African American (non-Hispanic alone), 0.6% Native American (non-Hispanic alone), 0.3% Asian (non-Hispanic alone), 0.06% Pacific Islander (non-Hispanic alone), and 3.81% from other or multiple races (non-Hispanic). Hispanic or Latino residents of any race comprised 2.1% of the population.

There were 6,391 households in the county, of which 29.4% had children under the age of 18 living with them and 24.2% had a female householder with no spouse or partner present. About 28.5% of all households were made up of individuals and 14.5% had someone living alone who was 65 years of age or older.

There were 7,189 housing units, of which 11.1% were vacant. Among occupied housing units, 74.3% were owner-occupied and 25.7% were renter-occupied. The homeowner vacancy rate was 2.1% and the rental vacancy rate was 9.0%.

=== 2000 census ===
As of the census of 2000, there were 16,653 people, 6,511 households, and 4,557 families residing in the county. The population density was 20 people per square mile (7.7 people/km^{2}). There were 7,247 housing units at an average density of 8 units per square mile (3.1/km^{2}). The racial makeup of the county was 97.33% White, 0.61% Black or African American, 0.59% Native American, 0.15% Asian, 0.01% Pacific Islander, 0.39% from other races, and 0.92% from two or more races. Approximately 1.07% of the population were Hispanic or Latino of any race.

There were 6,511 households, out of which 32.30% had children under the age of 18 living with them, 58.80% were married couples living together, 7.60% had a female householder with no husband present, and 30.00% were non-families. 26.10% of all households were made up of individuals, and 13.90% had someone living alone who was 65 years of age or older. The average household size was 2.51 and the average family size was 3.02.

In the county, the population was spread out, with 26.50% under the age of 18, 7.50% from 18 to 24, 26.00% from 25 to 44, 22.60% from 45 to 64, and 17.40% who were 65 years of age or older. The median age was 38 years. For every 100 females there were 95.20 males. For every 100 females age 18 and over, there were 91.50 males.

The median income for a household in the county was $30,731, and the median income for a family was $36,470. Males had a median income of $30,298 versus $19,772 for females. The per capita income for the county was $15,477. About 11.50% of families and 14.50% of the population were below the poverty line, including 18.30% of those under age 18 and 14.10% of those age 65 or over.

=== Religion ===
According to the Association of Religion Data Archives County Membership Report (2010), Bates County is regarded as being a part of the Bible Belt, with evangelical Protestantism being the most predominant religion. The most predominant denominations among residents in Bates County who adhere to a religion are Southern Baptists (34.21%), United Methodists (15.78%), and Christian Churches and Churches of Christ (14.48%).

== Education ==
K-12 school districts covering any part of the county, no matter how slight, include:

- Adrian R-III School District
- Appleton City R-II School District
- Archie R-V School District
- Ballard R-II School District
- Butler R-V School District
- Drexel R-IV School District
- Hume R-VIII School District
- Miami R-I School District
- Rich Hill R-IV School District

There is one elementary school district, Hudson R-IX School District.

=== Public schools ===
- Adrian R-III School District – Adrian
  - Adrian Elementary School (PK-05)
  - Adrian High School (06-12)
- Ballard R-II School District – Butler
  - Ballard Elementary School (PK-06)
  - Ballard High School (07-12)
- Butler R-V School District – Butler
  - Butler Elementary School (K-06)
  - Butler High School (07-12)
- Hume R-VIII School District – Hume
  - Hume Elementary School (PK-05)
  - Hume High School (06-12)
- Miami R-I School District – Amoret
  - Miami Elementary School (K-06)
  - Miami High School (07-12)
- Rich Hill R-IV School District – Rich Hill
  - Rich Hill Elementary School (K-05)
  - Rich Hill High School (06-12)
- Hudson R-IX School District – Appleton City postal address (the district is not in the Appleton City limits)
  - Hudson Elementary School (PK–8)

=== Private schools ===
- Zion Lutheran School – Rockville (02-09) – Lutheran

=== Public libraries ===
- Butler Public Library
- Rich Hill Memorial Library

=== Community colleges ===
Metropolitan Community College has all parts of the county (except those in the Appleton City R-II School District) in its out of district service area, but not its in-district taxation area.

== Politics ==
=== Local ===
Politics are divided at the local level in Bates County. Republicans hold a majority of the elected positions in the county.

Bates County, Missouri

Elected countywide officials
Assessor	Carl Bettels	Republican
Circuit Clerk	Shelli White	Republican
County Clerk	Jami Page	Republican
Commissioner (presiding)	Jim Wheatley	Republican
Commissioner (northern district)	Ken Mooney	Republican
Commissioner (southern district)	Trent Nelson	Republican
Coroner	Greg Mullinax	Republican
Prosecuting Attorney	Hugh C. Jenkins	Republican
Public Administrator	Brenda Doody	Democratic
Recorder	Danyelle Baker	Republican
Sheriff	Chad Anderson	Republican
Surveyor	W.C. “Bill” Lethcho	Democratic
Treasurer/Collector	Jimmy Platt	Democratic

=== State ===
Past Gubernatorial Elections Results
Year	Republican	Democratic	Third Parties
2024	78.50% 6,402	19.67% 1,604	1.83% 149
2020	76.70% 6,410	21.08% 1,762	2.21% 185
2016	59.64% 4,772	37.36% 2,989	3.00% 240
2012	45.46% 3,513	51.40% 3,972	3.14% 243
2008	41.75% 3,431	55.43% 4,555	2.82% 232
2004	53.22% 4,479	45.09% 3,795	1.69% 142
2000	48.88% 3,783	49.02% 3,794	2.10% 162
1996	34.70% 2,483	63.33% 4,531	1.97% 141
1992	42.06% 3,204	57.94% 4,414	0.00% 0

Bates County is split between three legislative districts in the Missouri House of Representatives, all of which are held by Republicans.

- District 56 — Michael Davis (R-Kansas City). Consists of unincorporated areas in the northwestern quadrant of the county south of Drexel.

Missouri House of Representatives — District 56 — Bates County (2020)
Party	Candidate	Votes	%	±%
Republican	Michael Davis	244	71.98%	−28.02
Democratic	Neal Barnes	95	28.02%	+28.02

Missouri House of Representatives — District 56 — Bates County (2018)
Party	Candidate	Votes	%	±%
Republican	Jack Bondon	200	100.00%	+25.33

- District 57 — Rodger Reedy (R-Windsor). Consists of unincorporated areas in the northern part of the county south of Archie and Creighton.

Missouri House of Representatives — District 57 — Bates County (2020)
Party	Candidate	Votes	%	±%
Republican	Rodger Reedy	438	100.00%	+29.83

Missouri House of Representatives — District 57 — Bates County (2018)
Party	Candidate	Votes	%	±%
Republican	Rodger Reedy	254	70.17%	−1.80
Democratic	Joan Shores	108	29.83%	+1.80

- District 126 — Patricia Pike (R-Adrian). Consists of most of the entire county.

Missouri House of Representatives — District 126 — Bates County (2020)
Party	Candidate	Votes	%	±%
Republican	Patricia Pike	5,850	78.42%	+6.72
Democratic	Jim Hogan	1,610	21.58%	−4.87

Missouri House of Representatives — District 126 — Bates County (2018)
Party	Candidate	Votes	%	±%
Republican	Patricia Pike	4,332	71.70%	−28.30
Democratic	Jim Hogan	1,598	26.45%	+26.45
Constitution	Stephen Biles	112	1.85%	+1.85

All of Bates County is a part of Missouri's 31st Senatorial District in the Missouri Senate and is currently represented by Rick Brattin (R-Harrisonville).

Missouri Senate — District 31 — Bates County (2020)
Party	Candidate	Votes	%	±%
Republican	Rick Brattin	6.323	77.76%	+6.74
Democratic	Raymond Kinney	1,808	22.24%	+22.24

Missouri Senate — District 31 — Bates County (2016)
Party	Candidate	Votes	%	±%
Republican	Ed Emery	5,373	71.02%	+9.57
Independent	Tim Wells	1,459	19.29%	
Libertarian	Lora Young	733	9.69%	+9.69

=== Federal ===
All of Bates County is included in Missouri's 4th Congressional District and as of 2022 was represented by Vicky Hartzler (R-Harrisonville) in the U.S. House of Representatives. Hartzler was elected to a sixth term in 2020 over Democratic challenger Lindsey Simmons.

U.S. House of Representatives — Missouri's 4th Congressional District — Bates County (2020)
Party	Candidate	Votes	%	±%
Republican	Vicky Hartzler	6,539	78.88%	+5.43
Democratic	Lindsey Simmons	1,556	18.77%	−5.11
Libertarian	Steven K. Koonse	195	2.35%	−0.32

U.S. House of Representatives — Missouri’s 4th Congressional District — Bates County (2018)
Party	Candidate	Votes	%	±%
Republican	Vicky Hartzler	4,893	73.45%	−0.24
Democratic	Renee Hoagenson	1,591	23.88%	+1.83
Libertarian	Mark Bliss	178	2.67%	−1.59

Bates County, along with the rest of the state of Missouri, is represented in the U.S. Senate by Josh Hawley (R-Columbia) and Roy Blunt (R-Strafford).

U.S. Senate – Class I – Bates County (2018)
Party	Candidate	Votes	%	±%
Republican	Josh Hawley	4,467	66.82%	+23.37
Democratic	Claire McCaskill	1,906	28.51%	−19.76
Independent	Craig O'Dear	183	2.74%	
Libertarian	Japheth Campbell	89	1.33%	−6.95
Green	Jo Crain	40	0.60%	+0.60

Blunt was elected to a second term in 2016 over then-Missouri Secretary of State Jason Kander.

U.S. Senate — Class III — Bates County (2016)
Party	Candidate	Votes	%	±%
Republican	Roy Blunt	4,630	58.06%	+14.61
Democratic	Jason Kander	2,866	35.94%	−12.33
Libertarian	Jonathan Dine	259	3.25%	−5.02
Green	Johnathan McFarland	126	1.58%	+1.58
Constitution	Fred Ryman	94	1.18%	+1.18

==== Political culture ====
United States presidential election results for Bates County, Missouri
Year	Republican		Democratic		Third party(ies)	
Year	No.	%	No.	%	No.	%
1888	2,674	38.07%	3,556	50.63%	794	11.30%
1892	1,928	27.65%	3,007	43.12%	2,039	29.24%
1896	2,522	32.63%	5,073	65.64%	133	1.72%
1900	2,731	39.26%	3,591	51.62%	634	9.11%
1904	2,956	47.11%	2,967	47.28%	352	5.61%
1908	2,754	44.07%	3,248	51.98%	247	3.95%
1912	1,383	22.95%	3,057	50.72%	1,587	26.33%
1916	2,597	42.88%	3,255	53.75%	204	3.37%
1920	5,039	51.91%	4,433	45.66%	236	2.43%
1924	4,552	47.11%	4,722	48.87%	389	4.03%
1928	6,133	62.70%	3,594	36.74%	54	0.55%
1932	3,395	35.02%	6,220	64.16%	79	0.81%
1936	5,022	46.60%	5,681	52.71%	74	0.69%
1940	5,727	53.33%	4,978	46.36%	33	0.31%
1944	5,122	55.46%	4,096	44.35%	18	0.19%
1948	4,156	48.71%	4,371	51.22%	6	0.07%
1952	6,002	60.03%	3,995	39.95%	2	0.02%
1956	5,467	55.97%	4,300	44.03%	0	0.00%
1960	5,429	58.16%	3,906	41.84%	0	0.00%
1964	3,514	40.50%	5,162	59.50%	0	0.00%
1968	4,087	49.49%	3,370	40.81%	801	9.70%
1972	5,314	63.76%	3,020	36.24%	0	0.00%
1976	3,350	43.60%	4,288	55.80%	46	0.60%
1980	4,061	54.00%	3,297	43.84%	163	2.17%
1984	4,223	59.38%	2,889	40.62%	0	0.00%
1988	3,574	51.57%	3,332	48.08%	24	0.35%
1992	2,499	32.33%	2,993	38.72%	2,238	28.95%
1996	2,904	40.69%	3,224	45.17%	1,009	14.14%
2000	4,245	54.48%	3,386	43.45%	161	2.07%
2004	5,004	59.11%	3,398	40.14%	64	0.76%
2008	4,833	58.35%	3,271	39.49%	179	2.16%
2012	5,020	64.60%	2,557	32.90%	194	2.50%
2016	6,001	74.24%	1,618	20.02%	464	5.74%
2020	6,597	78.39%	1,672	19.87%	147	1.75%
2024	6,702	80.32%	1,563	18.73%	79	0.95%

At the presidential level, Bates County has become solidly Republican in recent years. Bates County strongly favored Donald Trump in both 2016 and 2020. Bill Clinton was the last Democratic presidential nominee to carry Bates County in 1996 with a plurality of the vote, and a Democrat hasn't won majority support from the county's voters in a presidential election since Jimmy Carter in 1976.

Like most rural areas throughout Missouri, voters in Bates County generally adhere to socially and culturally conservative principles which tend to influence their Republican leanings, at least on the state and national levels. Despite Bates County's longstanding tradition of supporting socially conservative platforms, voters in the county have a penchant for advancing populist causes. In 2018, Missourians voted on a proposition (Proposition A) concerning right to work, the outcome of which ultimately reversed the right to work legislation passed in the state the previous year. 75.43% of Bates County voters cast their ballots to overturn the law.

=== Missouri presidential preference primaries ===
==== 2020 ====
The 2020 presidential primaries for both the Democratic and Republican parties were held in Missouri on March 10. On the Democratic side, former Vice President Joe Biden (D-Delaware) both won statewide and carried Bates County by a wide margin. Biden went on to defeat President Donald Trump in the general election.

Missouri Democratic Presidential Primary – Bates County (2020)
Party	Candidate	Votes	%	±%
Democratic	Joe Biden	602	63.77	
Democratic	Bernie Sanders	273	28.92	
Democratic	Tulsi Gabbard	18	1.91	
Democratic	Others/Uncommitted	51	5.40	

Incumbent President Donald Trump (R-Florida) faced a primary challenge from former Massachusetts Governor Bill Weld, but won both Bates County and statewide by overwhelming margins.

Missouri Republican Presidential Primary – Bates County (2020)
Party	Candidate	Votes	%	±%
Republican	Donald Trump	947	97.83	
Republican	Bill Weld	2	0.21	
Republican	Others/Uncommitted	19	1.96	

==== 2016 ====
The 2016 presidential primaries for both the Republican and Democratic parties were held in Missouri on March 15. Businessman Donald Trump (R-New York) narrowly won the state overall and carried a plurality of the vote in Bates County. He went on to win the presidency.

Missouri Republican Presidential Primary – Bates County (2016)
Party	Candidate	Votes	%	±%
Republican	Donald Trump	1,306	46.04	
Republican	Ted Cruz	1,080	38.07	
Republican	John Kasich	199	7.01	
Republican	Marco Rubio	143	5.04	
Republican	Others/Uncommitted	109	3.84	

On the Democratic side, former Secretary of State Hillary Clinton (D-New York) narrowly won statewide, but Senator Bernie Sanders (I-Vermont) won a majority of the vote in Bates County.

Missouri Democratic Presidential Primary – Bates County (2016)
Party	Candidate	Votes	%	±%
Democratic	Bernie Sanders	632	53.12	
Democratic	Hillary Clinton	518	43.53	
Democratic	Others/Uncommitted	40	3.36	

==== 2012 ====
The 2012 Missouri Republican Presidential Primary's results were nonbinding on the state's national convention delegates. Voters in Bates County supported former U.S. Senator Rick Santorum (R-Pennsylvania), who finished first in the state at large, but eventually lost the nomination to former Governor Mitt Romney (R-Massachusetts). Delegates to the congressional district and state conventions were chosen at a county caucus, which selected a delegation favoring Santorum. Incumbent President Barack Obama easily won the Missouri Democratic Primary and renomination. He defeated Romney in the general election.

==== 2008 ====
In 2008, the Missouri Republican Presidential Primary was closely contested, with Senator John McCain (R-Arizona) prevailing and eventually winning the nomination.

Missouri Republican Presidential Primary – Bates County (2008)
Party	Candidate	Votes	%	±%
Republican	John McCain	594	37.71	
Republican	Mike Huckabee	503	31.94	
Republican	Mitt Romney	368	23.37	
Republican	Ron Paul	71	4.51	
Republican	Others/Uncommitted	39	2.48	

Then-Senator Hillary Clinton (D-New York) received more votes than any candidate from either party in Bates County during the 2008 presidential primary. Despite initial reports that Clinton had won Missouri, Barack Obama (D-Illinois), also a Senator at the time, narrowly defeated her statewide and later became that year's Democratic nominee, going on to win the presidency.

Missouri Democratic Presidential Primary – Bates County (2008)
Party	Candidate	Votes	%	±%
Democratic	Hillary Clinton	1,427	63.51	
Democratic	Barack Obama	676	30.08	
Democratic	Others/Uncommitted	144	6.41	

== Communities ==
=== Cities ===
- Adrian
- Amoret
- Amsterdam
- Butler (county seat)
- Drexel
- Rich Hill
- Rockville
- Hume

=== Villages ===
- Foster
- Merwin
- Passaic

=== Unincorporated communities ===
- Altona
- Ballard
- Burdett
- Crescent Hill
- Hudson
- Johnstown
- Mayesburg
- New Home
- Nyhart
- Papinville
- Pleasant Gap
- Prairie City
- Sprague
- Spruce
- Virginia
- Worland

=== Townships ===
Bates County is divided into 24 townships:

- Charlotte
- Deepwater
- Deer Creek
- East Boone
- Elkhart
- Grand River
- Homer
- Howard
- Hudson
- Lone Oak
- Mingo
- Mound
- Mount Pleasant
- New Home
- Osage
- Pleasant Gap
- Prairie
- Rockville
- Shawnee
- Spruce
- Summit
- Walnut
- West Boone
- West Point

== Notable people ==
- Robert Heinlein, science fiction author who was born and lived in Butler, mentioned the town and county in his short story "Requiem" and the novel To Sail Beyond the Sunset
- Howard Maple, professional athlete in American football and baseball
- Charles O'Rear, photographer and author best known for his photo Bliss, the default wallpaper of Windows XP
- Stan Wall, former Major League Baseball pitcher for the Los Angeles Dodgers
- Warren Welliver, Missouri Supreme Court Justice (1979–1989)

== See also ==
- National Register of Historic Places listings in Bates County, Missouri
