= Tornado outbreak sequence of April 19–21, 1973 =

Weather event in the United States

Meteorological history
- Formed: April 19, 1973
- Dissipated: April 21, 1973

Tornado outbreak
- Tornadoes: 68 confirmed
- Max. rating: F4 tornado
- Duration: 2 days, 13 hours, 25 minutes
- Highest winds: 70 kn (81 mph; 130 km/h) in South Dakota on April 19
- Largest hail: 4 inches (10 cm) in diameter in Iowa on April 21

Overall effects
- Fatalities: 2
- Injuries: 106
- Damage: $31,355,000 (1973 USD) (Note: All losses are in 1973 USD unless otherwise noted.) $359 million (2025 USD)
- Areas affected: Southern and Midwestern United States, primarily Arkansas, Missouri, and Oklahoma
- Part of the tornadoes and tornado outbreaks of 1973

On April 19–21, 1973, a significant tornado outbreak sequence affected portions of the Southern and Midwestern United States, primarily in the states of Arkansas, Missouri, and Oklahoma. The severe weather event generated at least 68 tornadoes, 12 of which were rated as intense events on the Fujita scale. A destructive F3 tornado struck Batesville, Arkansas, injuring 18 people. An F4 tornado killed one person and injured three others near Atlanta, Missouri, though its rating is disputed among tornado specialists. Additionally, destructive F3 tornadoes occurred near Ada, Oklahoma, and Harrison, Arkansas, respectively, killing one person and injuring 40 others. (Note: An outbreak is generally defined as a group of at least six tornadoes (the number sometimes varies slightly according to local climatology) with no more than a six-hour gap between individual tornadoes. An outbreak sequence, prior to (after) the start of modern records in 1950, is defined as a period of no more than two (one) consecutive days without at least one significant (F2 or stronger) tornado.) (Note: The Fujita scale was devised under the aegis of scientist T. Theodore Fujita in the early 1970s. Prior to the advent of the scale in 1971, tornadoes in the United States were officially unrated. While the Fujita scale has been superseded by the Enhanced Fujita scale in the U.S. since February 1, 2007, Canada used the old scale until April 1, 2013; nations elsewhere, like the United Kingdom, apply other classifications such as the TORRO scale.) (Note: Historically, the number of tornadoes globally and in the United States was and is likely underrepresented: research by Grazulis on annual tornado activity suggests that, as of 2001, only 53% of yearly U.S. tornadoes were officially recorded. Documentation of tornadoes outside the United States was historically less exhaustive, owing to the lack of monitors in many nations and, in some cases, to internal political controls on public information. Most countries only recorded tornadoes that produced severe damage or loss of life. Significant low biases in U.S. tornado counts likely occurred through the early 1990s, when advanced NEXRAD was first installed and the National Weather Service began comprehensively verifying tornado occurrences.)

== Outbreak statistics ==
Confirmed tornadoes by Fujita rating
FU	F0	F1	F2	F3	F4	F5	Total
0	4	26	26	9	3	0	≥ 68*
"FU" denotes unclassified but confirmed tornadoes.

- At least four other tornadoes were reported by either Storm Data or Grazulis, but are not listed in the official records maintained by the Storm Prediction Center. They are as follows:

•Benton County, Missouri (west of Lincoln) – Possible F2 tornado razed a barn and a trailer.
•Andrew County, Missouri (Savannah) – Tornado reported.
•DeKalb County, Missouri – Tornado reported.
•Harrison County, Missouri (Eagleville) – Tornado reported.

Impacts by region
Region	Locale	Deaths	Injuries	Damages	Source
United States	Arizona	0	0	Unknown	
United States	Arkansas	1	39	$5,533,000	
United States	Illinois	0	2	$8,300,000	
United States	Iowa	0	6	$2,703,000	
United States	Kansas	0	0	$2,530	
United States	Kentucky	0	0	$75,000	
United States	Missouri	1	29	$9,490,000	
United States	Oklahoma	0	27	$5,050,000	
United States	North Dakota	0	0	$25,000	
United States	South Dakota	0	2	$102,500	
United States	Tennessee	0	1	$75,000	
Total		2	106	$31,355,000	

== Confirmed tornadoes ==
=== April 19 event ===
Confirmed tornadoes – Thursday, April 19, 1973 (Note: All dates are based on the local time zone where the tornado touched down; however, all times are in Coordinated Universal Time and dates are split at midnight CST/CDT for consistency.) (Note: Prior to 1994, only the average widths of tornado paths were officially listed.)
F#	Location	County / Parish	State	Start coord.	Time (UTC)	Path length	Max. width	Summary
F1	Nashville	Sevier	AR	33.95°N 93.85°W	15:45–?	0.1 miles (0.16 km)	33 yards (30 m)	A brief, narrow tornado produced minimal damage, accompanied by 1-inch-diameter (2.5 cm) hail. Losses only totaled $30.
F1	E of Millington	Shelby	TN	35.33°N 89.83°W	16:15–?	1 mile (1.6 km)	100 yards (91 m)	This short-lived tornado struck a number of mobile homes, six of which were damaged significantly. Nearby, 13 others sustained minor damage. Losses totaled $25,000. The tornado occurred near present-day Naval Support Activity Mid-South.
F2	N of Kensington	Smith	KS	39.87°N 99.03°W	16:31–?	4.6 miles (7.4 km)	100 yards (91 m)	A tornado affected farmland in northern Kansas, wrecking farm equipment and several outbuildings. Losses totaled $2,500. Tornado researcher Thomas P. Grazulis did not list the tornado as an F2 or stronger.
F1	E of Mountain Valley	Garland	AR	34.63°N 93.05°W	16:55–?	0.1 miles (0.16 km)	33 yards (30 m)	Another short-lived tornado downed trees and electrical lines. Nearby, it leveled a barn as well. Losses totaled $2,500. The actual touchdown location may have been south of Hot Springs.
F3	Southern Batesville	Independence	AR	35.75°N 91.63°W	17:15–?	1 mile (1.6 km)	500 yards (460 m)	See section on this tornado – A total of 18 people were injured.
F2	Northeastern North Little Rock	Pulaski	AR	34.8°N 92.25°W	17:17–?	1 mile (1.6 km)	100 yards (91 m)	This tornado occurred near present-day Lakewood Park and caused general tree damage as it skipped along. Losses totaled $250,000. Grazulis did not list the tornado as an F2 or stronger.
F1	N of Olive Branch	Lauderdale	TN	35.75°N 89.67°W	17:30–?	0.1 miles (0.16 km)	100 yards (91 m)	A store received minimal damage to its roof and one of its walls. A home in the area slid off its foundation, and several trees were downed. Losses totaled $25,000.
F1	WSW of Tylersville	Dyer	TN	36°N 89.58°W	18:35–?	0.1 miles (0.16 km)	50 yards (46 m)	A very brief tornado inflicted damage to several structures, including a mobile home that was flattened, as well as an electrical wire. One person was injured and losses totaled $25,000.
F2	N of Covington	Pemiscot	MO	36.13°N 89.87°W	19:00–?	2.5 miles (4.0 km)	33 yards (30 m)	This tornado occurred near Gibson and Hayti. Losses totaled $25,000. Grazulis did not list the tornado as an F2 or stronger.
F2	S of Hickman to WNW of Farmington	Fulton, Hickman, Graves	KY	36.55°N 89.18°W	19:30–?	35.4 miles (57.0 km)	33 yards (30 m)	A long-tracked, skipping tornado or tornado family produced three intermittent areas of damage. It first caused minimal damage to a cemetery near Hickman. Later, it leveled several barns and felled trees in its path near Pryorsburg and Mayfield. Losses totaled $25,000.
F2	ESE of Artesian to ENE of Alpena	Sanborn	SD	44°N 97.9°W	20:15–?	20.1 miles (32.3 km)	200 yards (180 m)	A tornado tracked northwest across Sanborn County, tearing the roof off a business and leveling a barn. Some other barns sustained damage as well. The time of occurrence may have been 23:15 UTC. Two people were injured and losses totaled $25,000.
F2	S of England	Lonoke	AR	34.5°N 91.97°W	20:15–?	0.1 miles (0.16 km)	33 yards (30 m)	A short-lived tornado caused damage to four mobile homes, trees, electrical wires, and farm equipment. Losses totaled $250,000. Grazulis did not list the tornado as an F2 or stronger.
F2	SSE of Hendron to NW of Little Cypress	McCracken, Marshall	KY	37.03°N 88.62°W	21:30–?	9.1 miles (14.6 km)	33 yards (30 m)	A skipping tornado or series of tornadoes first appeared south of Paducah and struck the edge of the Little Cypress settlement, where it leveled a few trailers and caused marginal F2-level damage. Power lines were blown down as well, and nearby structures sustained some damage. Losses totaled $25,000.
F1	WNW of Oak Level	Marshall	KY	36.87°N 88.47°W	22:00–?	0.1 miles (0.16 km)	33 yards (30 m)	A short-lived tornado occurred near Kaler and struck a rural area, producing minimal damage to trees and structures. Losses were unknown.
F1	S of Alvord	Lyon	IA	43.3°N 96.3°W	22:00–?	1 mile (1.6 km)	50 yards (46 m)	Losses totaled $25,000.
F1	SSE of Goodwin	Lee	AR	34.88°N 91°W	22:15–?	0.1 miles (0.16 km)	33 yards (30 m)	A tornado struck a home, causing minor damage, and leveled outbuildings before dissipating. Nearby trees were prostrated as well. Losses totaled $2,500.
F2	ENE of Harding	Union	KY	37.65°N 87.97°W	22:30–?	0.5 miles (0.80 km)	33 yards (30 m)	A low-end F2 tornado near Grove Center killed cattle on a farm and damaged or destroyed several structures. Losses totaled $25,000.
F2	ENE of King City to NE of Gentryville	Gentry	MO	40.08°N 94.4°W	23:00–?	5.9 miles (9.5 km)	50 yards (46 m)	A strong tornado caused $2,500 in damage. Grazulis did not list the tornado as an F2 or stronger.
F1	ENE of Kiron	Crawford	IA	42.2°N 95.3°W	23:00–?	1 mile (1.6 km)	300 yards (270 m)	This tornado caused $25,000 in damage.
F1	NW of Volin	Turner	SD	43°N 97.23°W	23:07–?	1 mile (1.6 km)	33 yards (30 m)	This tornado caused $25,000 in damage.
F2	WNW of Rockham to SW of Miranda	Faulk	SD	44.92°N 98.9°W	23:30–?	4.9 miles (7.9 km)	27 yards (25 m)	This tornado caused $2,500 in damage. Grazulis did not list the tornado as an F2 or stronger.
F1	NE of Spencer	McCook	SD	43.78°N 97.5°W	23:30–?	2 miles (3.2 km)	27 yards (25 m)	This tornado caused $25,000 in damage.
F2	N of Carbon Hill	Grundy	IL	41.3°N 88.3°W	23:45–?	0.1 miles (0.16 km)	33 yards (30 m)	Losses totaled $250,000. Grazulis did not list the tornado as an F2 or stronger.
F1	NE of Miranda to WNW of Devoe	Edmunds	SD	45°N 98.93°W	00:00–?	6.4 miles (10.3 km)	20 yards (18 m)	Losses totaled $25,000.
F2	SE of Cameron	Clinton, Caldwell	MO	39.7°N 94.2°W	00:00–?	1 mile (1.6 km)	50 yards (46 m)	Losses totaled $2,500. Grazulis did not list the tornado as an F2 or stronger.
F1	SW of Beaconsfield	Ringgold	IA	40.77°N 94.1°W	00:15–?	2.7 miles (4.3 km)	300 yards (270 m)	Losses totaled $25,000.
F1	Southeastern Creston	Union	IA	41.05°N 94.35°W	00:20–?	1 mile (1.6 km)	200 yards (180 m)	Losses totaled $25,000.
F4	Western Windsor	Henry	MO	38.53°N 93.53°W	01:30–?	10 miles (16 km)	880 yards (800 m)	A large tornado, reportedly up to 1 1/2 mi (2.4 km) wide at times, struck the Windsor area, resulting in five injuries. Losses totaled $25,000. Grazulis did not list the tornado as an F2 or stronger.
F2	NW of Osceola	Clarke	IA	41.1°N 93.83°W	02:00–?	2 miles (3.2 km)	400 yards (370 m)	This tornado passed a short distance west-southwest of Jamison. Losses totaled $25,000. Grazulis did not list the tornado as an F2 or stronger.
F0	W of Wishek	McIntosh	ND	46.25°N 99.77°W	02:00–?	0.1 miles (0.16 km)	33 yards (30 m)	A brief, very weak tornado demolished some structures on a couple of farms, including granaries. Losses totaled $25,000.

=== April 20 event ===
Confirmed tornadoes – Friday, April 20, 1973
F#	Location	County / Parish	State	Start coord.	Time (UTC)	Path length	Max. width	Summary
F2	N of Velma	Stephens	OK	34.5°N 97.67°W	05:00–?	2 miles (3.2 km)	83 yards (76 m)	This tornado destroyed or damaged several homes. Four minor injuries were reported. Losses totaled $25,000.
F2	NE of Hiawatha	Brown	KS	39.88°N 95.47°W	05:30–?	0.2 miles (0.32 km)	100 yards (91 m)	Losses totaled only $30. Grazulis did not list the tornado as an F2 or stronger. The tornado may have occurred earlier than officially listed, at around 17:00 UTC.
F2	SW of Pauls Valley to W of Byars	Garvin, McClain	OK	34.7°N 97.3°W	05:45–?	16.8 miles (27.0 km)	250 yards (230 m)	Outbuildings and a school were destroyed or extensively damaged. Two people were injured. Losses totaled $2.5 million.
F3	Ada to WNW of Francis	Pontotoc	OK	34.78°N 96.68°W	06:15–?	7.9 miles (12.7 km)	100 yards (91 m)	A large and intense tornado, attended by downbursts, destroyed numerous homes and a trailer park as it moved through parts of Ada. At the Ada Municipal Airport, the tornado flattened a hangar and destroyed many airplanes. A phonograph record became lodged in a utility pole. The tornado attained a peak width of up to 1 1/2 mi (2.4 km) at times. 21 people were injured and losses totaled $2.5 million.
F1	SSE of Subiaco	Logan	AR	35.25°N 93.62°W	13:30–?	0.1 miles (0.16 km)	33 yards (30 m)	A very short-lived tornado touched down north-northeast of Corley. A barn and a chicken coop sustained minor damage. Losses totaled $2,500. The tornado may have first affected Cove Lake.
F2	E of Morrison Bluff	Logan	AR	35.38°N 93.5°W	13:50–?	1.5 miles (2.4 km)	500 yards (460 m)	11 homes and barns were damaged. Two people were injured and losses totaled $25,000. Grazulis did not list the tornado as an F2 or stronger.
F3	ENE of Gaither to NE of Harrison	Boone	AR	36.15°N 93.15°W	16:15–?	7.8 miles (12.6 km)	500 yards (460 m)	1 death – About 200 structures were destroyed or damaged. Several homes shifted on their foundations and partly disintegrated, large fragments of which careened through the air. A woman was thrown 100 yards (91 m) from her home and killed. 19 people were injured and losses totaled $2.5 million. This tornado may have first touched down near Mount Sherman in Newton County.
F1	N of Kalona	Washington	IA	41.5°N 91.7°W	18:15–?	2 miles (3.2 km)	350 yards (320 m)	Losses totaled $25,000.
F0	NW of Osceola to ENE of Lowry City	St. Clair	MO	38.08°N 93.75°W	19:00–?	5.7 miles (9.2 km)	17 yards (16 m)	Losses totaled $2,500.
F1	E of Crooks Springs	St. Clair	MO	37.92°N 93.83°W	19:08–?	13 miles (21 km)	17 yards (16 m)	This tornado, which touched down south-southwest of Roscoe, leveled barns and cabins in its path. Losses totaled $250,000. The tornado may have continued as far as Osceola, as homes sustained damage or had their roofs torn off there. Grazulis classified the tornado as an F2.
F2	W of Roscoe to WSW of Osceola	St. Clair	MO	37.97°N 93.85°W	19:10–?	5.7 miles (9.2 km)	17 yards (16 m)	Losses totaled $25,000. Grazulis did not list the tornado as an F2 or stronger.
F1	ESE of Billingsville	Cooper	MO	38.9°N 92.78°W	19:50–?	0.1 miles (0.16 km)	10 yards (9.1 m)	Losses totaled $2,500.
F3	SW of Crisp	Cedar, Dade	MO	37.57°N 93.8°W	20:30–?	1 mile (1.6 km)	50 yards (46 m)	This tornado developed east-northeast of Arcola. Losses totaled $25,000. Grazulis did not list the tornado as an F2 or stronger.
F3	ESE of Santiago	Pettis, Benton	MO	38.42°N 93.4°W	20:30–?	5 miles (8.0 km)	50 yards (46 m)	Losses totaled $2,500. Grazulis did not list the tornado as an F2 or stronger.
F0	SW of Holbrook	Navajo	AZ	34.83°N 110.23°W	20:55–?	0.1 miles (0.16 km)	33 yards (30 m)	A brief tornado was reported by aircraft flying in the vicinity. Losses were unknown.
F0	WNW of Pulaski	Davis	IA	40.7°N 92.3°W	22:00–?	2 miles (3.2 km)	150 yards (140 m)	Losses totaled $2,500.
F2	S of Carrollton	Carroll	MO	39.32°N 93.5°W	22:55–?	5 miles (8.0 km)	33 yards (30 m)	Losses totaled $25,000. Grazulis did not list the tornado as an F2 or stronger.
F1	NE of Vista to ENE of Iconium	St. Clair, Benton	MO	38.02°N 93.63°W	23:05–?	9.8 miles (15.8 km)	33 yards (30 m)	Losses totaled $25,000.
F3	NE of Warsaw to Western Cole Camp to W of Bahner	Benton, Pettis	MO	38.3°N 93.28°W	23:15–?	19.4 miles (31.2 km)	100 yards (91 m)	This intense tornado leveled numerous structures, including both small and large homes in its path. The tornado tore off the roof of a farmhouse and dispersed debris more than 2 mi (3.2 km) from foundations. Four injuries (possibly three) occurred, two of which were inside a barn. Losses totaled $250,000. Grazulis classified the tornado as an F4. The tornado may have occurred at 23:45 UTC.
F4	N of Atlanta to SE of La Plata	Macon	MO	39.93°N 92.48°W	23:30–?	3.8 miles (6.1 km)	440 yards (400 m)	1 death – A violent tornado leveled a couple of homes, 12 barns, and several garages. A woman died in a home that crumpled and disintegrated. Three injuries occurred. Losses totaled $25,000. Grazulis classified the tornado as an F3.
F2	Mora	Benton	MO	38.53°N 93.22°W	00:00–?	2 miles (3.2 km)	33 yards (30 m)	Losses totaled $250,000. Grazulis did not list the tornado as an F2 or stronger.
F3	NNW of Santiago to NNW of Manila	Benton, Pettis	MO	38.45°N 93.47°W	00:25–?	10.1 miles (16.3 km)	100 yards (91 m)	This tornado severely damaged a home near Brandon and caused significant damage to farm equipment. Other homes and barns had their roofs ripped off and sustained general damage. Losses totaled $250,000. The tornado ended southeast of Green Ridge.
F3	SW of Arbela to NE of Prospect Grove	Scotland	MO	40.43°N 92.05°W	00:35–?	9.5 miles (15.3 km)	440 yards (400 m)	This tornado destroyed or damaged at least nine homes, one of which it unroofed. Only the kitchen of one home remained. A gas station was destroyed as well, and a car was thrown and tumbled for 100 yd (91 m). Losses totaled $250,000. Grazulis classified the tornado as an F2.
F2	SSW of Hoffman	Cooper	MO	38.83°N 92.95°W	00:35–?	2.3 miles (3.7 km)	50 yards (46 m)	This tornado occurred outside Pilot Grove. It struck and leveled a pair of large barns. A nearby home lost its roof as well. Losses totaled $25,000.
F2	E of Sedalia	Pettis	MO	38.7°N 93.18°W	01:25–?	2 miles (3.2 km)	50 yards (46 m)	This tornado, which struck near the Sedalia Memorial Airport, injured eight (possibly 13) people as it leveled numerous mobile homes and barns in its path. Airborne 2-by-4-inch (51 by 102 mm) boards reportedly pierced vehicles, and debris was strewn for a few miles. Losses totaled $2.5 million.
F3	WSW of Lockwood to N of Greenfield	Dade	MO	37.38°N 93.97°W	04:40–?	7.8 miles (12.6 km)	100 yards (91 m)	An intense tornado wrecked 15 homes as it passed through Lockwood, injuring six (possibly 12) people. A few of the homes were reportedly leveled. The tornado also damaged or destroyed half a dozen mobile homes and 31 other residences. Winds lofted and dispersed debris for 35 mi (56 km). Grazulis classified the tornado as an F4.

=== April 21 event ===
Confirmed tornadoes – Saturday, April 21, 1973
F#	Location	County / Parish	State	Start coord.	Time (UTC)	Path length	Max. width	Summary
F4	NE of Mill Grove to WNW of Lucerne	Mercer, Putnam	MO	40.33°N 93.55°W	20:00–?	14.6 miles (23.5 km)	440 yards (400 m)	A violent tornado leveled all structures on a few farms, including four homes and one mobile home. Several cattle were killed, and about 20 barns sustained at least some damage. The tornado lofted a car for up to 150 yd (140 m) from its original location and caused a pickup truck to disintegrate; portions of the truck were transported for 1/2 mi (0.80 km). One injury (possibly two) occurred inside a barn. Losses totaled $2.5 million.
F2	S of Holbrook to NE of Oxford	Iowa, Johnson	IA	41.58°N 91.92°W	21:40–?	13.2 miles (21.2 km)	33 yards (30 m)	This tornado hit 25 farms in its path, tearing off roofs, leveling several barns, and causing one home to slide and buckle. Six injuries (possibly only one) occurred. Losses totaled $2.5 million. The tornado dissipated west-southwest of Green Castle Airport.
F2	NNW of Millersburg to ENE of Green River	Mercer, Rock Island, Henry	IL	41.27°N 90.83°W	23:43–?	30.2 miles (48.6 km)	33 yards (30 m)	A long-tracked, erratic tornado or tornado family extensively damaged farm buildings in its path and killed livestock. Mobile homes and barns were leveled as well, resulting in two injuries. Losses totaled $2.5 million (possibly only $500,000).
F1	E of Houghton	Lee, Henry	IA	40.78°N 91.58°W	00:10–?	4.1 miles (6.6 km)	250 yards (230 m)	Losses totaled $25,000.
F1	SSW of Success	Craig	OK	36.6°N 95.03°W	02:00–?	0.1 miles (0.16 km)	120 yards (110 m)	Trees and power lines were downed as a tornado passed near Ketchum and Cleora. Losses totaled $25,000.
F1	NNE of Success to SSE of Afton	Craig, Delaware, Ottawa	OK	36.63°N 95.02°W	02:40–?	5.1 miles (8.2 km)	40 yards (37 m)	A tornado only damaged power lines in its path. Losses were unknown.
F2	Southern Wheaton	Cook	IL	41.85°N 88.1°W	03:00–?	0.2 miles (0.32 km)	33 yards (30 m)	A brief tornado caused damage to approximately 10 residences. Losses totaled $25,000. Grazulis did not list the tornado as an F2 or stronger.
F1	Western Wheaton	Cook	IL	41.87°N 88.12°W	03:15–?	0.2 miles (0.32 km)	33 yards (30 m)	A weak tornado flattened a home and lightly damaged several others nearby. Losses totaled $25,000.
F1	W of Winfield	Henry	IA	41.13°N 91.45°W	03:20–?	1 mile (1.6 km)	150 yards (140 m)	Losses totaled $25,000.
F2	SSW of Maxville	Jasper	MO	37.18°N 94.28°W	03:35–?	5 miles (8.0 km)	100 yards (91 m)	Losses totaled $25,000. Grazulis did not list the tornado as an F2 or stronger. The tornado developed east of Carthage.
F1	ENE of Langley to SSE of Walnut	Bureau	IL	41.37°N 89.68°W	04:15–?	11.6 miles (18.7 km)	33 yards (30 m)	This tornado and the following event badly damaged farms and killed livestock near Sheffield and Wyanet. Losses totaled $250,000.
F1	S of Manlius to W of Princeton	Bureau	IL	41.45°N 89.67°W	04:20–?	8.6 miles (13.8 km)	60 yards (55 m)	This tornado, the companion of the preceding event, produced an intermittent swath of damage. Losses totaled $250,000.

=== Batesville, Arkansas ===
Batesville, Arkansas
F3 tornado
- on the Fujita scale

Overall effects
- Injuries: 18
- Damage: $2.5 million (1973 USD) $28.7 million (2025 USD)

An intense tornado struck the town of Batesville and caused widespread destruction in its path. The tornado passed over the campus of Lyon College, which was called Arkansas College at the time. The tornado tore roofs from buildings on campus. The tornado also dislodged homes and other structures from their foundations, some of which sustained collapse of their walls or lost their roofs. At least one home was completely swept from its foundation but remained intact, suggesting little or no anchoring. 18 people were injured and losses totaled $2.5 million. Prolific rains attended the parent supercell, further damaging structures in town, and severe damage occurred to trees as well. The tornado is officially rated F3, but Thomas P. Grazulis assigned an F2 rating because structures were unattached to their foundations.

== Non-tornadic effects ==
Numerous reports of strong winds and hail came out of this outbreak sequence, including an 80-mile-per-hour (130 km/h) wind gust in Huron, South Dakota, on April 19 and 4-inch-diameter (10 cm) hail in New London, Iowa, on April 21. Overall, there were 101 reports of hail and strong winds.

== See also ==
- List of North American tornadoes and tornado outbreaks

== Sources ==
- Brooks, Harold E. (April 2004). "On the Relationship of Tornado Path Length and Width to Intensity". Weather and Forecasting. 19 (2). Boston: American Meteorological Society: 310–19. Bibcode:2004WtFor..19..310B. doi:10.1175/1520-0434(2004)019<0310:OTROTP>2.0.CO;2.
- Cook, A. R.; Schaefer, J. T. (August 2008). Written at Norman, Oklahoma. "The Relation of El Niño–Southern Oscillation (ENSO) to Winter Tornado Outbreaks". Monthly Weather Review. 136 (8). Boston: American Meteorological Society: 3135. Bibcode:2008MWRv..136.3121C. doi:10.1175/2007MWR2171.1.
- Grazulis, Thomas P. (July 1993). Significant Tornadoes 1680–1991: A Chronology and Analysis of Events. St. Johnsbury, Vermont: The Tornado Project of Environmental Films. ISBN 1-879362-03-1.
- Grazulis, Thomas P. (2001a). The Tornado: Nature's Ultimate Windstorm. Norman: University of Oklahoma Press. ISBN 978-0-8061-3538-0.
- Grazulis, Thomas P. (2001b). F5-F6 Tornadoes. St. Johnsbury, Vermont: The Tornado Project of Environmental Films.
- National Weather Service (April 1973). Storm Data Publication (Report). National Centers for Environmental Information – via Storm Events Database.
- National Weather Service (April 1973). "Storm Data and Unusual Weather Phenomena". Storm Data. 4 (15). Asheville, North Carolina: National Climatic Data Center.
