= Osceola (disambiguation) =

Osceola is the name of a nineteenth-century Seminole leader in the United States of America.

Osceola may also refer to

== People ==
- Pen name used by the Danish author Karen Blixen (1885–1962)

== Places ==
In Canada:

- Osceola, Ontario, a community in Admaston Bromley, Ontario

In the United States:

- Osceola, Arkansas
- Osceola, Indiana
- Osceola, Iowa
- Osceola, Missouri
- Osceola, Nebraska
- Osceola, Nevada
- Osceola, New York
- Osceola, South Dakota
- Osceola, West Virginia
- Osceola, Wisconsin, a village in Polk County
- Osceola, Fond du Lac County, Wisconsin, a town
- Osceola, Grant County, Wisconsin, a projected town which never materialized in what would become Potosi
- Osceola, Polk County, Wisconsin, a town
- Mount Osceola, White Mountains, New Hampshire

== Waterbodies ==
- Lake Osceola, Winter Park, Florida
- Lake Osceola (Coral Gables) on the University of Miami campus

== Other uses ==
- Osceola and Renegade, symbols of Florida State University
- Osceola National Forest, a national forest in Florida
- Osceola and St Croix Valley Railway, a heritage railroad in Osceola, Wisconsin
- Osceola, a subspecies of wild turkey
- USS Osceola, the name of several United States Navy ships
- Tom and John Osceola, characters in Key Largo (film)
- Osceola, a synonym of the moth genus Peoria (moth)

== See also ==
- Osceola County (disambiguation)
- Osceola Mills, Pennsylvania
- Osceola Township (disambiguation)
- Oceola (disambiguation)
