= Straight Branch =

Straight Branch may refer to:

- Straight Branch (Deepwater Creek), a stream in Missouri
- Straight Branch (Spencer Creek), a stream in Missouri
