= Ohio, Missouri =

Unincorporated community in Missouri, U.S.

Coordinates: 38°09′20″N 93°51′07″W

Ohio is an unincorporated community in northern St. Clair County, in the U.S. state of Missouri. The community is at the intersection of Missouri routes A and F and south of Cooper Creek. Lowry City is on Missouri Route 13 approximately seven miles to the east and Appleton City is approximately nine miles to the west-northwest on Missouri Route 52.

== History ==
A post office called Ohio was established in 1878, and remained in operation until 1941. The community took its name from Ohio, the native state of a large share of the first settlers.
