= Tiffin (disambiguation) =

Tiffin is a light meal eaten during the day.

Tiffin may also refer to:

== People ==
- Annabel Tiffin, presenter of the regional BBC news programme, North West Tonight
- Charles Tiffin, architect
- Edward Tiffin (1766–1829), the first governor of Ohio
- Helen Tiffin, professor of English
- Hero Fiennes Tiffin, English actor
- Jock Tiffin (1896–1966), general secretary of the British Transport and General Workers' Union (TGWU)
- Pamela Tiffin (1942–2020), American actress

== Places ==
In the United States:

- Tiffin, Iowa
- Tiffin, Missouri
- Tiffin, Ohio
- Tiffin Township, Adams County, Ohio
- Tiffin Township, Defiance County, Ohio
- Tiffin River, in Ohio and Michigan

== Other ==
- Tiffin (book), cookbook
- Tiffin (confectionery), a chocolate confection made with raisins and crushed biscuits
- Tiffin carrier or box, another name for the Indian dabba lunchbox
- Tiffin School, a selective grammar school for boys in Kingston upon Thames
- Tiffin Girls' School, a selective grammar school in Kingston upon Thames
- Tiffin University, a private university in Tiffin, Ohio, United States
- Glassware made by the United States Glass Company is sometimes referred to as "Tiffin glass"
- Tiffin (horse)
