= Chalk Level =

Chalk Level may refer to:

- Chalk Level, Missouri
- Chalk Level, Virginia
