= Deepwater Creek =

Stream in Henry County, Missouri, US

Deepwater Creek is a stream in Henry County in west central Missouri. It is a tributary of the Truman Reservoir.

The stream begins at the confluence of North Deepwater Creek and South Deepwater Creek in western Henry County (at 38°17′25″N 94°02′43″W) east-southeast of the community of Johnstown. The stream flows east-northeast passing under Missouri Route K north of Germantown. The stream is impounded as Montrose Lake within the Montrose Conservation Area. Below the Montrose Dam the stream flows generally east passing south of La Due. It continues to the east passing north of Deepwater to enter the Truman Reservoir west of the Missouri Route 13 bridge (at 38°15′52″N 93°43′00″W) at an elevation of 705 ft (215 m).

The stream was known as a stream of deep water and the name Deepwater also served as a school, a village post office and township in the vicinity.

Several streams, including Bear Creek, Brushy Creek, Cooper Creek, Granddaddy Creek and Straight Branch flow into Deepwater Creek.
