= Missouri Route 82 =

State highway in Missouri, U.S.

Route 82
- Route 82 highlighted in red

Route information
- Maintained by MoDOT
- Length: 38.752 mi (62.365 km)

Major junctions
- West end: US 54 in El Dorado Springs
- East end: Route 83 east of Osceola

Location
- Country: United States
- State: Missouri

Highway system
- Missouri State Highway System; Interstate; US; State; Supplemental
← Route 81	→ Route 83

Route 82 is a highway in southwest Missouri. Its eastern terminus is at Route 83 in northwest Hickory County; its western terminus is at U.S. Route 54 in El Dorado Springs.

== History ==
From 1922 to about 1927, Route 82 west of Osceola was part of Route 26, which ran from the Kansas state line east to Osceola. It became part of US 54 west of El Dorado Springs in 1926 or 1927, and the eastern half was renumbered Route 62. When US 62 was extended into Missouri in the early 1930s, Route 62 became Route 82.

== Major intersections ==
County	Location	mi	km	Destinations	Notes
Cedar	El Dorado Springs	0.000	0.000	US 54 – Collins, Nevada	
St. Clair		25.768	41.470	Route 13 Bus. north – Osceola	Western end of Route 13 Bus. overlap
St. Clair		25.966	41.788	Route 13 – Lowry City, Collins	Eastern end of Route 13 Bus. overlap
Hickory–Benton county line		38.752	62.365	Route 83 – Warsaw, Quincy	
1.000 mi = 1.609 km; 1.000 km = 0.621 mi
