= Raney, Missouri =

Unincorporated community in Missouri, U.S.

Coordinates: 37°57′07″N 93°43′44″W

Raney is an unincorporated community in southeastern St. Clair County, in the U.S. state of Missouri. The community is located along Missouri Route V approximately four miles southwest of Vista. It is on a ridge between the Sac River to the west and Coon Creek to the east. Waters of the Truman Reservoir reach into the Sac and Coon Creek to the northwest and northeast of the community.

== History ==
A variant spelling was "Rainey". A post office called Rainey was established in 1893, and remained in operation until 1906. The community has the name of H. G. Rainey, the original owner of the town site.
