= Cooper Creek (Deepwater Creek tributary) =

Stream in the American state of Missouri

Cooper Creek is a stream in Henry and St. Clair counties of Missouri. It is a tributary of Deepwater Creek within the Truman Reservoir.

The stream headwaters are in St Clair County just west of the community of Ohio at 38°09′14″N 93°52′11″W. The stream flows to the northeast into Henry County and passes under Missouri Route 13. The confluence with the Deepwater Creek arm of the Truman Reservoir is at 38°15′54″N 93°44′01″W approximately midway between Deepwater to the northwest and Brownington to the southeast.

Cooper Creek bears the name of a pioneer citizen.

== See also ==
- List of rivers of Missouri
