= Bear Creek (Deepwater Creek tributary) =

Stream in Missouri, U.S.

Bear Creek is a stream in Henry County in the U.S. state of Missouri. It is a tributary of Deepwater Creek.

The stream headwaters arise in the southwest corner of Henry County about 2.5 miles north of Appleton City (at 38°13′42″N 94°02′07″W) at an elevation of about 920 ft (280 m) adjacent to Missouri Route KK. Tke stream flows northeast to east passing under Missouri Route 52 south and then again east of Montrose to its confluence with Deepwater Creek southeast of La Due (at 38°17′37″N 93°51′53″W) at an elevation of 712 ft (217 m).

Bear Creek most likely was named for the bears in the area.

== See also ==
- List of rivers of Missouri
