= Jim Kalberloh =

American politician

Member of the Missouri House of Representatives
- Incumbent
- Assumed office January 6, 2021
- Preceded by: Warren Love
- Constituency: 125th district (2021–2023); 126th district (2023–present)

Personal details
- Born: Appleton City, Missouri, U.S.
- Party: Republican
- Spouse: Christie
- Children: 3

Military service
- Branch/service: United States Army
- Unit: Missouri National Guard
- Battles/wars: War in Afghanistan

Jim Kalberloh is an American politician serving as a member of the Missouri House of Representatives. Elected in November 2020 from the 125th district, he assumed office on January 6, 2021. After redistricting in 2022, he was re-elected from district 126.

== Early life and education ==
Kalberloh was born in Appleton City and raised on a farm in Lowry City, Missouri. He graduated from Lakeland High School and earned a diploma in farm management from Platt College (now Northwest Missouri State University).

== Career ==
Outside of politics, Kalberloh owns a restaurant, the Landmark Restaurant in Lowry City, and works as a cattle farmer. He also served as a member of the Missouri National Guard for 21 years and was deployed to Afghanistan in 2003 and 2004. He was elected to the Missouri House of Representatives in November 2020 and assumed office on January 6, 2021.

== Electoral history ==
=== State representative ===
Missouri House of Representatives Primary Election, August 4, 2020, District 125
Party	Candidate	Votes	%	±%
Republican	Jim Kalberloh	4,184	58.18%	
Republican	Nick Allison	3,007	41.82%	
Total votes		7,191	100.00%	

Missouri House of Representatives Election, November 3, 2020, District 125
Party	Candidate	Votes	%	±%
Republican	Jim Kalberloh	16,403	100.00%	
Total votes		16,403	100.00%	

Missouri House of Representatives Primary Election, August 2, 2022, District 126
Party	Candidate	Votes	%	±%
Republican	Jim Kalberloh	4,028	57.13%	−1.05
Republican	David Kelsay	3,023	42.87%	+1.05
Total votes		7,051	100.00%	

Missouri House of Representatives Election, November 8, 2022, District 126
Party	Candidate	Votes	%	±%
Republican	Jim Kalberloh	11,605	100.00%	0.00
Total votes		11,605	100.00%	
