= Taber Township, St. Clair County, Missouri =

Inactive township in the American state of Missouri

Coordinates: 38.0544°N 93.9828°W

Taber Township is an inactive township in St. Clair County, in the U.S. state of Missouri.

Taber Township was erected in 1870, taking its name from the community of Taberville, Missouri.
