= Tiffin, Missouri =

Unincorporated community in Missouri, U.S.

Coordinates: 37°57′18″N 93°56′18″W

Tiffin is an unincorporated community in southern St. Clair County, in the U.S. state of Missouri.

The community is on Missouri Route 82 seven miles northeast of El Dorado Springs and fourteen miles southwest of Osceola. Little Clear Creek, a tributary to Clear Creek, flows past one mile west of the community and the upper reaches of the Harry S Truman Reservoir are 2.5 miles to the north.

== History ==
Variant names were "New Tiffin" and "Whitley". The community was platted under the name Whitley in 1890. The Tiffin post office closed in 1955.
