= Chalk Level Township, St. Clair County, Missouri =

Inactive township in Missouri, U.S.

Coordinates: 38.1461°N 93.7875°W

Chalk Level Township is an inactive township in St. Clair County, in the U.S. state of Missouri.

Chalk Level Township was erected in 1869, taking its name from the community of Chalk Level, Missouri.
