= Oceola =

Oceola may refer to the following places in the United States:

- Oceola, Ohio
- Oceola Township, Michigan

== See also ==
- Osceola (disambiguation)
