= Osceola Township =

Osceola Township may refer to:

- Osceola Township, Stark County, Illinois
- Osceola Township, Clarke County, Iowa
- Osceola Township, Franklin County, Iowa
- Osceola Township, Houghton County, Michigan
- Osceola Township, Osceola County, Michigan
- Osceola Township, Renville County, Minnesota
- Osceola Township, Camden County, Missouri
- Osceola Township, St. Clair County, Missouri
- Osceola Township, Pennsylvania
- Osceola Township, Brown County, South Dakota, in Brown County, South Dakota
- Osceola Township, Grant County, South Dakota, in Grant County, South Dakota

== See also ==
- Oceola Township, Michigan
