= Osceola Public School Building =

- U.S. National Register of Historic Places
- Location within Missouri Location within the United States
- Location: Jct. of Fifth and Pine Sts., Osceola, Missouri
- Coordinates: 38°2′41″N 93°42′3″W
- Area: 2 acres (0.81 ha)
- Built: 1914-1915, 1937
- Architect: Heckenlively, James L.; Smith, Charles A.
- Architectural style: Four-over-four school
- NRHP reference No.: 98001638
- Added to NRHP: January 21, 1999

Osceola Public School Building, also known as Osceola High School Building, is a historic school building located at Osceola, St. Clair County, Missouri. The original section was built in 1914–1915, and is a three-story, brick and cut stone building. It features a segmental arched, recessed main entrance, located in a projecting centered bay. A two-story brick and cut stone addition designed by architect Charles A. Smith was added in 1937.

It was added to the National Register of Historic Places in 1999.
