= Doyal Township, St. Clair County, Missouri =

Inactive township in the American state of Missouri

Coordinates: 37.9592°N 93.6850°W

Doyal Township is an inactive township in St. Clair County, in the U.S. state of Missouri.

Doyal Township was erected in 1872, taking its name from H. L. M. Doyal, an early settler.
