= Teea Goans =

American country music singer

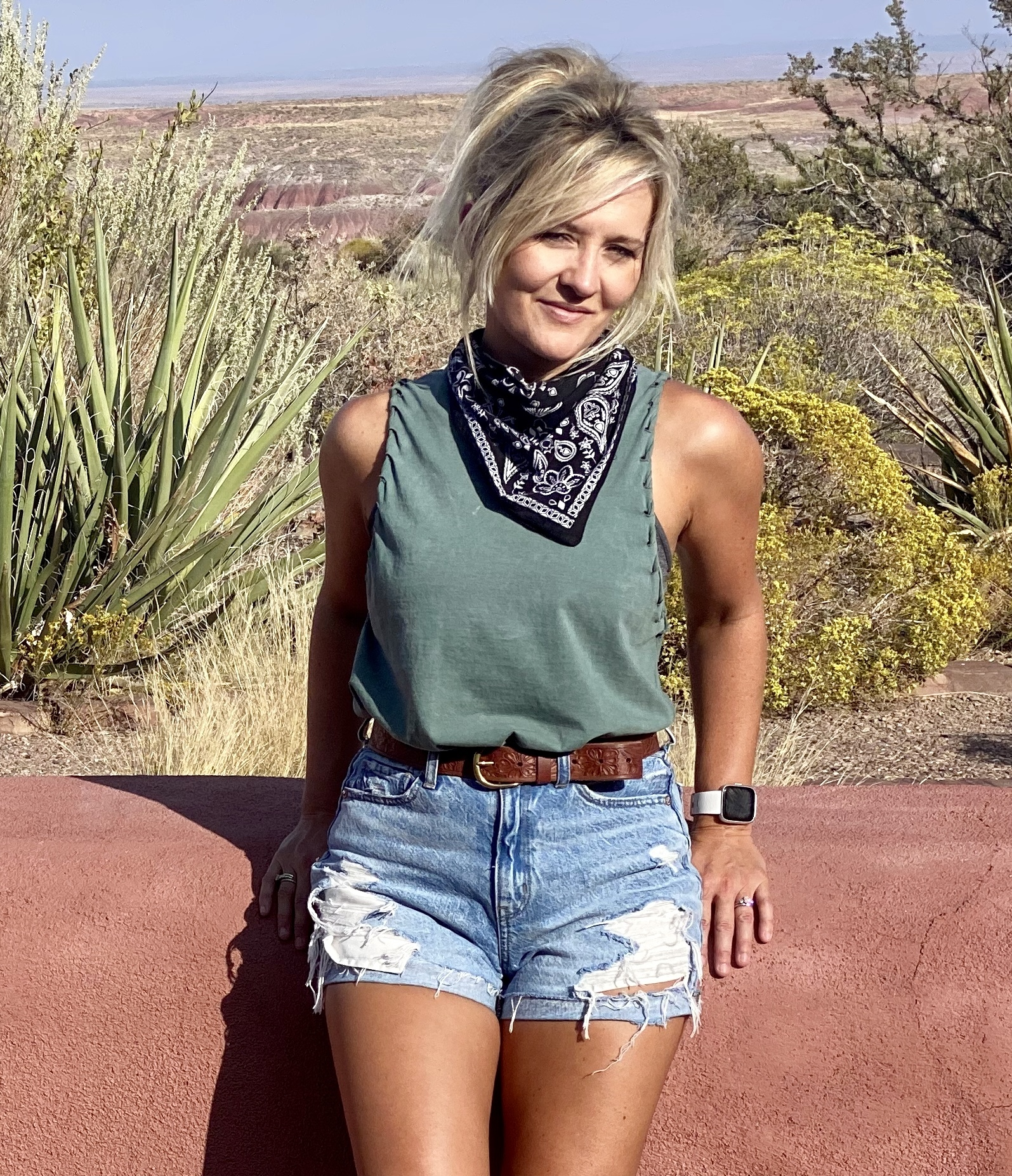
- Teea Goans in 2020

Background information
- Born: Teea Goans; January 5, 1980 (age 46); Lowry City, Missouri, U.S.
- Genre: Neotraditional Country
- Occupation: Singer
- Instruments: Vocals, guitar
- Years active: Since 2006
- Label: The Crosswind Corporation
- Website: TeeaGoans.com Teea Goans discography at MusicBrainz

Teea Goans (/ˈtiːə ˈɡoʊənz/ TEE-ə GOH-ənz) is an American country music singer. Goans recorded her first album, The Way I Remember It, in 2010.

== Biography ==
Teea Goans was born on January 5, 1980. She started singing in church at three years old. When she turned eight, she was spotted at a talent contest at the Truman Lake Opry. A year later, she became a full-fledged member. She continued to perform there every week until she was 17 and opened for acts such as Bill Anderson, Little Jimmy Dickens, and Grandpa Jones.

After high school, Goans earned her associate degree at Longview Community College in Kansas City and remained there after graduation. Her primary musical influence was her maternal grandmother, Della Lee Faulkner. A locally popular singer in the 1960s, Faulkner didn't pursue a career in order to take care of her seven children.

"I knew at a very young age that I would move to Nashville someday. I have a picture that I drew in third grade of me on the Grand Ole Opry stage. I knew that from the time I was a kid that I would be in Nashville." – Teea Goans

In 2002 Goans moved to Nashville. Three months later, she was engaged to her high school sweetheart Brandon; they married in 2003. Goans started working a variety of jobs, including selling cell phones. Her husband urged her to concentrate on her music and, heeding his advice to follow a musical career, she started writing songs and singing demos for other writers and played gigs. The first thing Goans worked on was the Ray Price show at the Ryman Auditorium in 2006 through radio station WSM, who later asked her to book and run talent for the Opry warm-up show. Along with these duties, Goans continued to write and demo songs.

At the Station Inn, a Nashville bluegrass club, she sang with The Time Jumpers and met her now producer Terry Choate.

Goans hosted a show called Inside The Opry Circle, which gave a fan's perspective from backstage after the Grand Ole Opry's Saturday night shows. Her first two on-air interviews were with Garth Brooks and Vince Gill.

In January 2010, Goans made her Grand Ole Opry debut. At The Ryman Auditorium, Jean Shephard, a Hall of Fame Inductee introduced Goans on stage to perform Bill Anderson's song "Walk Out Backwards". On July 27, 2010, she released her debut album, The Way I Remember It, on the independent Crosswind Music Group label. Also in 2010 she appeared on Larry's Country Diner, a TV series on RFD-TV. Her first video, "Letter from God", was nominated for the 26th annual Midsouth Regional Emmy Awards. Goans hosted the historical live radio broadcast the Ernest Tubb Midnite Jamboree for the first time on July 23, 2011. On July 15, 2012, Goans released her second studio album, That's Just Me.

== Musical career ==
=== The Way I Remember It ===
In 2010, Goans released The Way I Remember It, her debut album, a collection of 11 cover songs. Joe Spivey, the multi-instrumental performer of The Time Jumpers, is credited as an associate producer. The album's musicians included Spivey with three other Time Jumpers members in the production mix: steel guitarist Paul Franklin and fiddlers Aubrey Haynie and Kenny Sears.

The songs' composers include many members of the Nashville Songwriters Hall of Fame. From Ernest Tubb came "Walking The Floor Over You", Willie Nelson contributed "I'm Still Not Over You" (recorded by Ray Price in 1967), Merle Haggard and Red Lane "I Didn't Mean To Love You", Curly Putman and Sonny Thronkmorton's "Made For Loving You" (a top ten hit for Doug Stone) and Joe Allen's "Lying in My Arms" (a minor hot for Rex Allen Jnr). The recording of the Bill Anderson classic "Walk Out Backwards", was in 1961 his second Top 10.

Dan Tyminski, the singing voice of George Clooney on the Oh Brother Where Art Thou soundtrack "Man of Constant Sorrow", was Goans' vocal partner on the ballad "Made For Loving You".

=== That's Just Me ===
In 2012, Goans released That's Just Me, her second album. The album contains 13 songs, both covers and original material. It was produced by Terry Choate, a mentor to Goans, the man who elevated The Time Jumpers from a bar band to multiple Grammy nominations. Goans covered the songs "Misty Blue", "Nobody Wins", and "I’ve Done Enough Dyin' Today" by Larry Gatlin. Additionally, Goans included "Over the Rainbow", from the 1939 film The Wizard of Oz, after witnessing the reaction of an audience of World War II veterans to her live performance of the song.

=== Memories To Burn ===
In 2014, Goans released Memories to Burn, her third album. It included the traditional hymn Great is Thy Faithfulness. This album addtionally featured covers of Louis Armstrong's "What a Wonderful World", Merle Haggard's Sing a Sad Song, England Dan and John Ford Coley's What's Forever For and Mariah Carey's All I Want for Christmas Is You.

== Discography ==
=== Studio albums ===
- 2010: The Way I Remember It (Crosswind)
- 2012: That’s Just Me (Crosswind)
- 2014: Memories To Burn (Crosswind)
- 2017: Swing, Shuffle, and Sway (Crosswind)
- 2021: All Over the Map (Sparky’s Neighborhood)
