= John Baldwin (Missouri politician) =

American politician (1843–1934)

Member of the Missouri Senate from the 16th district

Personal details
- Born: May 15, 1843 Norwalk, Ohio
- Died: September 22, 1934 (aged 91)
- Party: Democratic
- Spouse: Margaret V. Chambers
- Education: Antioch College
- Occupation: politician, farmer, stockman

John Baldwin was an American politician from Appleton City, Missouri, who served in the Missouri Senate from 1911 to 1917. Baldwin was a wealthy farmer and ranch-owner, with properties both in Missouri and New Mexico.

Baldwin died of old age in his home in Appleton.
