= Dallas Township, St. Clair County, Missouri =

Inactive township in the American state of Missouri

Coordinates: 37.9594°N 93.5658°W

Dallas Township is an inactive township in St. Clair County, in the U.S. state of Missouri.

Dallas Township was erected in 1872.
