= Barney Fisher =

American politician (1947–2026)

Member of the Missouri House of Representatives from the 125th district
- In office January 5, 2005 – January 9, 2013
- Preceded by: Jerry King
- Succeeded by: Warren Love

Personal details
- Born: December 17, 1947 Nevada, Missouri, U.S.
- Died: April 10, 2026 (aged 78)
- Party: Republican

Barney Fisher (December 17, 1947 – April 10, 2026) was an American politician who served in the Missouri House of Representatives from the 125th district from 2005 to 2013. Fisher died on April 10, 2026, at the age of 78.
