= Monegaw Springs, Missouri =

Unincorporated community in Missouri, U.S.

Coordinates: 38°01′45″N 93°50′21″W

Monegaw Springs is an unincorporated community in St. Clair County, in the U.S. state of Missouri.

== History ==
A post office called Monegaw Springs was established in 1888, and remained in operation until 1953. The community took its name from a mineral spring of the same name near the original town site. The spring was originally named “Stinking Waters” but was later renamed Monegaw or “Owner of Much Money” in honor of Monegaw, an Osage tribal leader.

== Demographics ==
Historical population
Census	Pop.	Note	%±
1910	122		—
Missouri Census Data Center
