= Johnstown, Missouri =

Unincorporated community in Missouri, U.S.

Coordinates: 38°18′36″N 94°04′57″W

Johnstown is an unincorporated community in northeast Bates County, in the U.S. state of Missouri. The community is on Missouri Route D one half mile west of the Bates-Henry county line. Butler lies 13 miles to the west-southwest. North Deepwater Creek flows past the southwest side of the community.

== History ==
A post office called Johnstown was established in 1856, and remained in operation until 1916. A share of the first settlers having the first name John caused the name Johnstown to be selected.

== Demographics ==
Historical population
Census	Pop.	Note	%±
1900	75		—
1910	84		12.0%
1920	59		−29.8%
1930	59		0.0%
1940	30		−49.2%
1950	24		−20.0%
1960	27		12.5%
Missouri Census Data Center
