= Washington Township, St. Clair County, Missouri =

Inactive township in the American state of Missouri

Coordinates: 37.8689°N 93.7383°W

Washington Township is an inactive township in St. Clair County, in the U.S. state of Missouri.

Washington Township was erected in 1841, taking its name from President George Washington.
