= Brushy Creek (Deepwater Creek tributary) =

Stream in the American state of Missouri

Coordinates: 38.30961°N 93.99544°W

Brushy Creek is a stream in Bates and Henry counties in the U.S. state of Missouri. It is a tributary of Deepwater Creek.

Brushy Creek, also historically called "Brushy Branch" was so named on account of brush lining its course.

== See also ==
- List of rivers of Missouri
