= Cobb, St. Clair County, Missouri =

Unincorporated community in Missouri, U.S.

Coordinates: 37°53′40″N 93°45′17″W

Cobb is an unincorporated community in St. Clair County, in the U.S. state of Missouri.

== History ==
The community was so named on account of corn cobs a local farmer fed his animals, according to local history. Variant names were "Howards Mill" and "Ritchie Mill". A post office called Howard's Mills was in operation from 1854 until 1886, and the post office was called Cobb from 1889 until it was discontinued in 1918.
