= Pape, Missouri =

Unincorporated community in Missouri, U.S.

Coordinates: 37°58′16″N 93°57′03″W

Pape is an unincorporated community in St. Clair County, in the U.S. state of Missouri.

The community has the name of Gideon Pape, the proprietor of a local mill. A variant name was "Old Tiffin".
