= Hudson City School =

- U.S. National Register of Historic Places
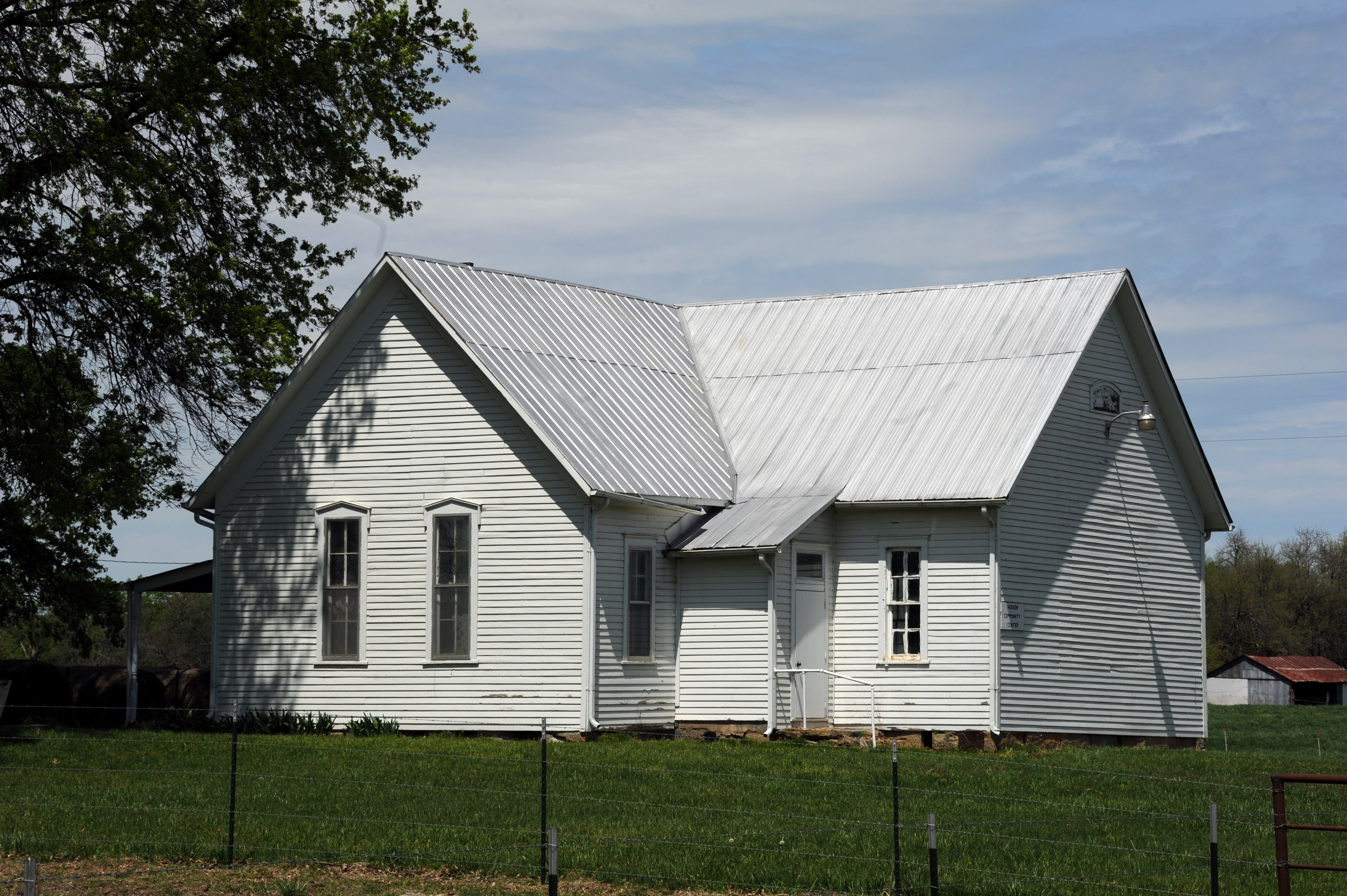

- Location within Missouri Location within the United States
- Nearest city: Approx. 1 mile NW of MO 52 and Hwy. W, near Appleton City, Missouri
- Coordinates: 38°12′12″N 94°5′25″W
- Area: less than one acre
- Built: 1891, 1911
- Architectural style: One-room schoolhouse
- NRHP reference No.: 02001110
- Added to NRHP: October 10, 2002

Palace Hotel, also known as Hudson School, Hudson Community Center, Brown's Chapel, Methodist Episcopal Church, and Hudson Methodist Church, is a historic one-room school building located near Appleton City, Bates County, Missouri. It was built in 1891, and originally housed a Methodist church. It was purchased and reconfigured for use as a school in 1911. It is a one-story, frame building with a cross-gable roof. It measures 45 feet, 6 inches, by 38 feet, 6 inches. It was last used as a schoolhouse in 1952.

It was listed on the National Register of Historic Places in 2002.
