= Crooks Springs, Missouri =

Unincorporated community in Missouri, U.S.

Coordinates: 37°55′01″N 93°50′29″W

Crooks Springs is an unincorporated community in southern St. Clair County, in the U.S. state of Missouri. The community is on Allen Branch a tributary of the Sac River approximately twelve miles southwest of Osceola.

The community has the name of Lee Crook, the proprietor of a destination spa near the original town site.
