= Collins, Missouri =

Village in St. Clair County, Missouri, United States

- Village
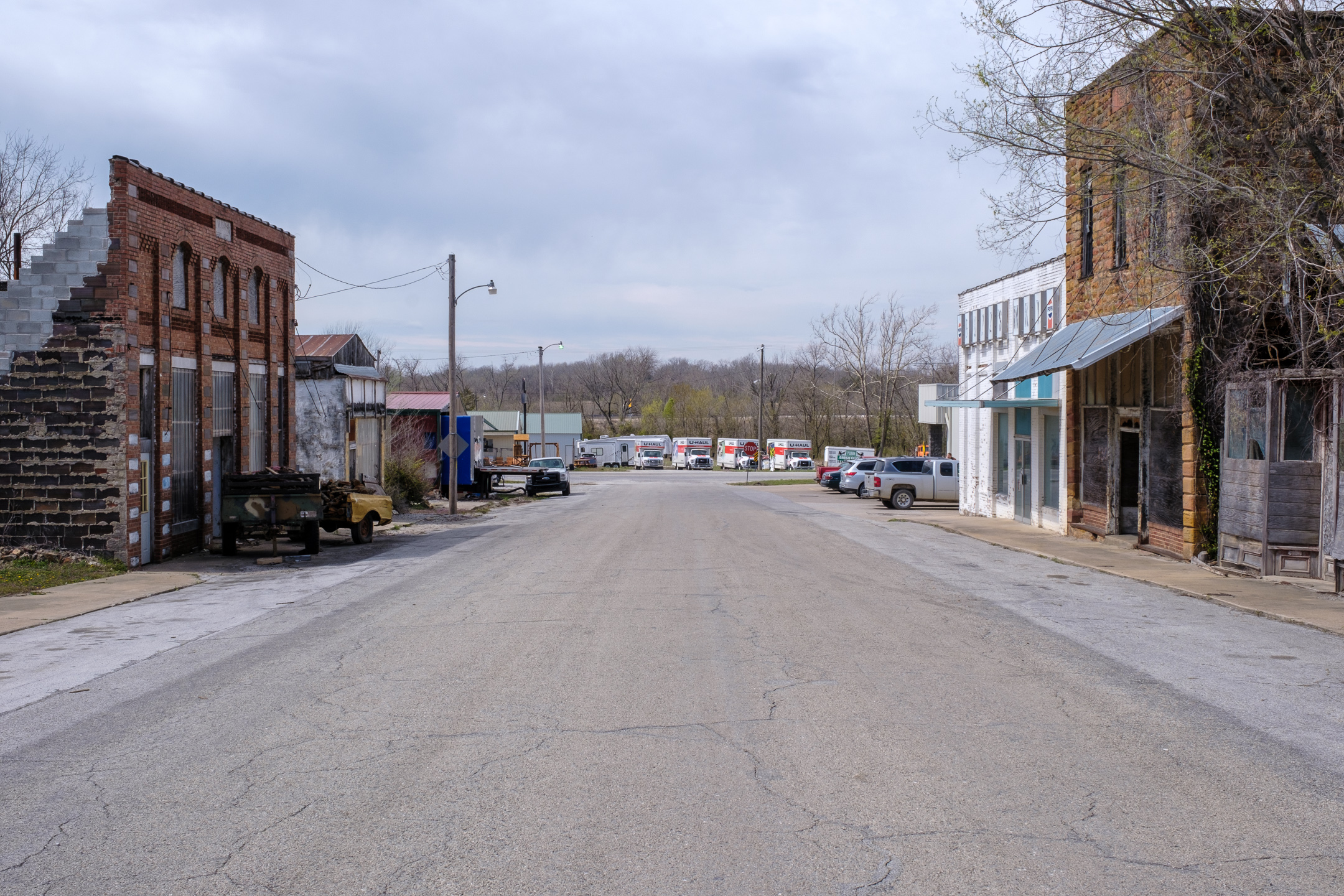

- Location of Collins, Missouri
- Coordinates: 37°53′24″N 93°37′19″W
- Country: United States
- State: Missouri
- County: St. Clair

Area
  - Total: 0.25 sq mi (0.64 km^{2})
  - Land: 0.25 sq mi (0.64 km^{2})
  - Water: 0 sq mi (0.00 km^{2})
- Elevation: 876 ft (267 m)

Population (2020)
  - Total: 125
  - Density: 506.5/sq mi (195.55/km^{2})
- Time zone: UTC-6 (Central (CST))
  - Summer (DST): UTC-5 (CDT)
- ZIP code: 64738
- FIPS code: 29-15562
- GNIS feature ID: 2398600

Collins is a village in St. Clair County, Missouri, United States. The population was 125 at the 2020 census.

== History ==
Collins was platted in 1885. The community takes its name from Collins Township. A post office called Collins has been in operation since 1873.

== Geography ==
According to the United States Census Bureau, the village has a total area of 0.25 square miles (0.65 km^{2}), all land.

== Demographics ==
Historical population
Census	Pop.	Note	%±
1900	260		—
1910	259		−0.4%
1920	265		2.3%
1930	243		−8.3%
1940	193		−20.6%
1950	199		3.1%
1960	177		−11.1%
1970	150		−15.3%
1980	145		−3.3%
1990	144		−0.7%
2000	176		22.2%
2010	159		−9.7%
2020	125		−21.4%
U.S. Decennial Census

=== 2010 census ===
As of the census of 2010, there were 159 people, 67 households, and 42 families living in the village. The population density was 636.0 inhabitants per square mile (245.6/km^{2}). There were 85 housing units at an average density of 340.0 per square mile (131.3/km^{2}). The racial makeup of the village was 99.4% White and 0.6% from two or more races. Hispanic or Latino of any race were 2.5% of the population.

There were 67 households, of which 31.3% had children under the age of 18 living with them, 41.8% were married couples living together, 16.4% had a female householder with no husband present, 4.5% had a male householder with no wife present, and 37.3% were non-families. 31.3% of all households were made up of individuals, and 14.9% had someone living alone who was 65 years of age or older. The average household size was 2.37 and the average family size was 2.95.

The median age in the village was 39.3 years. 27% of residents were under the age of 18; 9.5% were between the ages of 18 and 24; 18.2% were from 25 to 44; 26.4% were from 45 to 64; and 18.9% were 65 years of age or older. The gender makeup of the village was 48.4% male and 51.6% female.

=== 2000 census ===
As of the census of 2000, there were 176 people, 73 households, and 48 families living in the village. The population density was 1,154.0 inhabitants per square mile (445.6/km^{2}). There were 86 housing units at an average density of 563.9 per square mile (217.7/km^{2}). The racial makeup of the village was 97.16% White, 1.14% from other races, and 1.70% from two or more races. Hispanic or Latino of any race were 1.70% of the population.

There were 73 households, out of which 28.8% had children under the age of 18 living with them, 46.6% were married couples living together, 15.1% had a female householder with no husband present, and 34.2% were non-families. 27.4% of all households were made up of individuals, and 16.4% had someone living alone who was 65 years of age or older. The average household size was 2.41 and the average family size was 2.83.

In the village, the population was spread out, with 25.6% under the age of 18, 7.4% from 18 to 24, 23.3% from 25 to 44, 25.6% from 45 to 64, and 18.2% who were 65 years of age or older. The median age was 40 years. For every 100 females, there were 91.3 males. For every 100 females age 18 and over, there were 92.6 males.

The median income for a household in the village was $22,292, and the median income for a family was $24,375. Males had a median income of $30,313 versus $17,083 for females. The per capita income for the village was $10,344. About 31.1% of families and 30.7% of the population were below the poverty line, including 45.2% of those under the age of eighteen and 18.2% of those 65 or over.

== Transportation ==
Intercity bus service to the village is provided by Jefferson Lines.

== Education ==
It is in the Weaubleau R-III School District.

== See also ==
- List of cities in Missouri
