= Piper, Missouri =

Unincorporated community in Missouri, U.S.

Coordinates: 38°20′37″N 94°00′53″W

Piper is an unincorporated community in Henry County, in the U.S. state of Missouri. The community is on Missouri Route K and the northeast side of Granddaddy Creek. Clinton is approximately 12 miles to the east and Montrose Lake and the Montrose Conservation Area is two miles to the southeast on the Deepwater River.

== History ==
Piper was originally called Como, and under the latter name was laid out ca. 1880. A post office called Piper was established in 1895, and remained in operation until 1903. The present name honors Bob Piper, an original owner of the site.
