= Monegaw Township, St. Clair County, Missouri =

Township in St. Clair County, Missouri, U.S.

Coordinates: 38.1492°N 93.8839°W

Monegaw Township is an inactive township in St. Clair County, in the U.S. state of Missouri.

Monegaw Township was erected in 1841, taking its name from a spring of the same name within its borders. The spring has the name of Monegaw, an Osage tribal leader.
