= Butler Township, St. Clair County, Missouri =

Inactive township in the American state of Missouri

Coordinates: 38.1447°N 93.6914°W

Butler Township is an inactive township in St. Clair County, in the U.S. state of Missouri.

Butler Township was erected in 1868, taking its name from William Orlando Butler (1791–1880), a U.S. soldier in the War of 1812 and Mexican–American War, congressman (1839-1843), and 1848 Democratic vice-presidential candidate.
