= William T. Holmes =

American Civil War Medal of Honor recipient

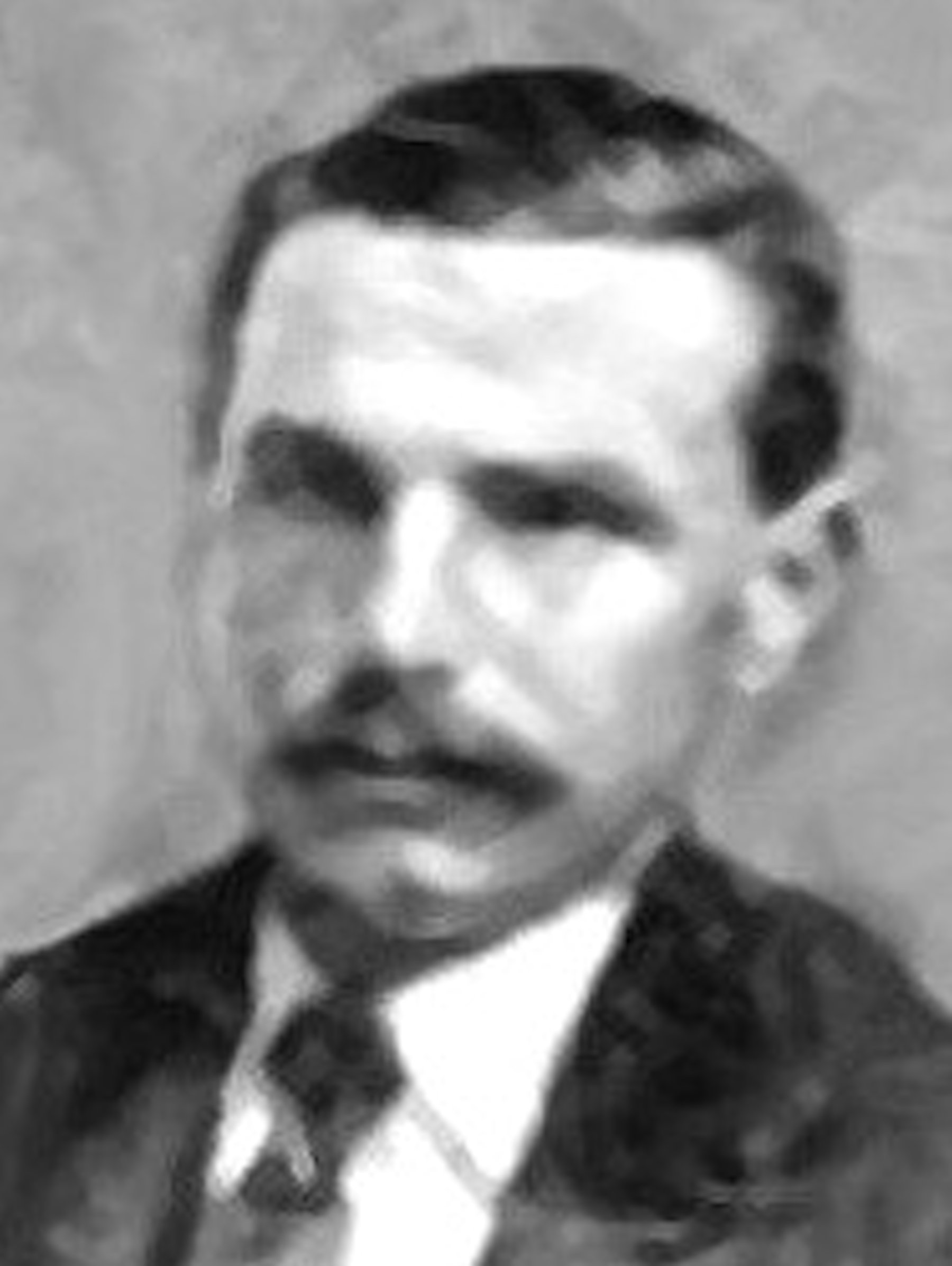
- Holms in c. 1898
- Born: June 7, 1846; Vermilion County, Illinois
- Died: August 31, 1916 (aged 70)
- Burial place: Appleton City, Missouri
- Military career
- Allegiance: United States
- Branch: United States Army
- Rank: Private
- Units: Company A, 3rd Regiment Indiana Cavalry
- Conflicts: American Civil War; Battle of Sailor's Creek
- Awards: Medal of Honor

William T. Holmes (June 7, 1846 – August 31, 1916) was a Union Army soldier in the American Civil War who received the U.S. military's highest decoration, the Medal of Honor.

Holmes was born in Vermilion County, Illinois on June 7, 1846, and entered service at Indianapolis, Indiana. He was awarded the Medal of Honor, for extraordinary heroism shown on April 6, 1865, at the Battle of Sailor's Creek, while serving as a Private with Company A, 3rd Regiment Indiana Cavalry. He won his medal for capturing the flag of the 27th Virginia Infantry Regiment. His Medal of Honor was issued on May 3, 1865.

Holmes died at the age of 70, on August 31, 1916, and was buried at Bean Cemetery in Appleton City, Missouri.

== Medal of Honor citation ==
The President of the United States of America, in the name of Congress, takes pleasure in presenting the Medal of Honor to Private William T. Holmes, United States Army, for extraordinary heroism on 6 April 1865, while serving with Company A, 3d Indiana Cavalry, in action at Deatonsville (Sailor's Creek), Virginia, for capture of flag of 27th Virginia Infantry (Confederate States of America).
