= Johnson City, Missouri =

Unincorporated community in Missouri, U.S.

Coordinates: 38°07′01″N 93°55′41″W

Johnson City is an unincorporated community in St. Clair County, in the U.S. state of Missouri.

== History ==
Johnson City was platted in 1867, and named after incumbent President Andrew Johnson. A post office called Johnson City was established in 1871, and remained in operation until 1904.
