= Speedwell Township, St. Clair County, Missouri =

Inactive township in the US state of Missouri

Coordinates: 37.9344°N 93.9900°W

Speedwell Township is an inactive township in St. Clair County, in the U.S. state of Missouri.

Speedwell Township was erected in 1841, and named after one Mr. Speedwell, a government surveyor.
