= Osceola Township, St. Clair County, Missouri =

Inactive township in the American state of Missouri

Coordinates: 38.0497°N 93.6889°W

Osceola Township is an inactive township in St. Clair County, in the U.S. state of Missouri.

Established in 1841, Osceola Township is named after the nearby community of Osceola, Missouri. As of 2022, the population was recorded to be 1,669, with a median age of 41.3 years.
