= Granddaddy Creek =

Stream in the American state of Missouri

Granddaddy Creek (also called Grand Daddys Branch) is a stream in Henry County, Missouri.

The stream headwaters are located at 38°23′18″N 94°00′49″W at an elevation of approximately 895 ft (273 m). the stream flows to the south passing under Missouri Route 18 just west of New Piper. The stream turns to the southeast past Piper to its confluence with Deepwater Creek within the upper reaches of Montrose Lake within the Montrose Conservation Area. The confluence is at 38°18′22″N 93°58′30″W at an elevation of 751 ft (229 m).

The creek was named after W. A. "Grandaddy" Gates, an early settler.

== See also ==
- List of rivers of Missouri
