= Gerster, Missouri =

- Town
- Location of Gerster, Missouri
- Coordinates: 37°57′17″N 93°34′37″W
- Country: United States
- State: Missouri
- County: St. Clair

Area
  - Total: 0.081 sq mi (0.21 km^{2})
  - Land: 0.081 sq mi (0.21 km^{2})
  - Water: 0 sq mi (0.00 km^{2})
- Elevation: 807 ft (246 m)

Population (2020)
  - Total: 21
  - Density: 260.6/sq mi (100.61/km^{2})
- Time zone: UTC-6 (Central (CST))
  - Summer (DST): UTC-5 (CDT)
- ZIP code: 64776
- FIPS code: 29-26902
- GNIS feature ID: 2396959

Gerster is a town in St. Clair County, Missouri, United States. The population was 21 at the 2020 census.

== History ==
Gerster was platted in 1898. and named after the Gerster family, the original owners of the town site. A post office called Gerster was established in 1898, and remained in operation until 1958.

== Geography ==
According to the United States Census Bureau, the village has a total area of 0.08 square miles (0.21 km^{2}), all land.

== Demographics ==
Historical population
Census	Pop.	Note	%±
1910	123		—
1920	118		−4.1%
1930	99		−16.1%
1940	108		9.1%
1950	47		−56.5%
1960	48		2.1%
1970	42		−12.5%
1980	45		7.1%
1990	40		−11.1%
2000	35		−12.5%
2010	25		−28.6%
2020	21		−16.0%
U.S. Decennial Census

=== 2010 census ===
As of the census of 2010, there were 25 people, 13 households, and 7 families living in the village. The population density was 312.5 inhabitants per square mile (120.7/km^{2}). There were 22 housing units at an average density of 275.0 per square mile (106.2/km^{2}). The racial makeup of the village was 96.0% White and 4.0% African American.

There were 13 households, of which 7.7% had children under the age of 18 living with them, 53.8% were married couples living together, and 46.2% were non-families. 46.2% of all households were made up of individuals, and 15.4% had someone living alone who was 65 years of age or older. The average household size was 1.92 and the average family size was 2.43.

The median age in the village was 48.5 years. 4% of residents were under the age of 18; 16% were between the ages of 18 and 24; 20% were from 25 to 44; 40% were from 45 to 64; and 20% were 65 years of age or older. The gender makeup of the village was 52.0% male and 48.0% female.

=== 2000 census ===
As of the census of 2000, there were 35 people, 15 households, and 10 families living in the town. The population density was 444.6 inhabitants per square mile (171.7/km^{2}). There were 20 housing units at an average density of 254.0 per square mile (98.1/km^{2}). The racial makeup of the town was 80.00% White and 20.00% Native American.

There were 15 households, out of which 26.7% had children under the age of 18 living with them, 46.7% were married couples living together, 20.0% had a female householder with no husband present, and 26.7% were non-families. 20.0% of all households were made up of individuals, and none had someone living alone who was 65 years of age or older. The average household size was 2.33 and the average family size was 2.64.

In the town the population was spread out, with 25.7% under the age of 18, 5.7% from 18 to 24, 22.9% from 25 to 44, 34.3% from 45 to 64, and 11.4% who were 65 years of age or older. The median age was 40 years. For every 100 females, there were 84.2 males. For every 100 females age 18 and over, there were 116.7 males.

The median income for a household in the town was $14,167, and the median income for a family was $16,250. Males had a median income of $18,750 versus $0 for females. The per capita income for the town was $5,289. There were 60.0% of families and 74.3% of the population living below the poverty line, including 100.0% of under eighteens and none of those over 64.

== Education ==
It is in the Osceola School District.
