= Roscoe, Missouri =

- Village
- Location of Roscoe, Missouri
- Coordinates: 37°58′38″N 93°48′50″W
- Country: United States
- State: Missouri
- County: St. Clair

Area
  - Total: 1.65 sq mi (4.28 km^{2})
  - Land: 1.53 sq mi (3.96 km^{2})
  - Water: 0.12 sq mi (0.32 km^{2})
- Elevation: 781 ft (238 m)

Population (2020)
  - Total: 89
  - Density: 58.1/sq mi (22.45/km^{2})
- Time zone: UTC-6 (Central (CST))
  - Summer (DST): UTC-5 (CDT)
- ZIP code: 64776
- FIPS code: 29-63074
- GNIS feature ID: 2399117

Roscoe is a village in St. Clair County, Missouri, United States. The population was 89 at the 2020 census.

== History ==
A post office called Roscoe has been in operation since 1867. Roscoe village incorporated in 1868.

== Geography ==
Roscoe is located in south central St. Clair County just south of an upper arm of the Truman Reservoir. The community is on Missouri Route 82 approximately eight miles southwest of Osceola.

According to the United States Census Bureau, the village has a total area of 1.66 square miles (4.30 km^{2}), of which 1.53 square miles (3.96 km^{2}) is land and 0.13 square miles (0.34 km^{2}) is water.

== Demographics ==
Historical population
| Census | Pop. | Note | %± |
|---|---|---|---|
| 1870 | 302 | | — |
| 1880 | 172 | | −43.0% |
| 1890 | 159 | | −7.6% |
| 1900 | 181 | | 13.8% |
| 1910 | 182 | | 0.6% |
| 1920 | 145 | | −20.3% |
| 1930 | 126 | | −13.1% |
| 1940 | 126 | | 0.0% |
| 1950 | 128 | | 1.6% |
| 1960 | 125 | | −2.3% |
| 1970 | 137 | | 9.6% |
| 1980 | 91 | | −33.6% |
| 1990 | 100 | | 9.9% |
| 2000 | 112 | | 12.0% |
| 2010 | 124 | | 10.7% |
| 2020 | 89 | | −28.2% |
U.S. Decennial Census

=== 2010 census ===
As of the census of 2010, there were 124 people, 51 households, and 33 families living in the village. The population density was 81.0 inhabitants per square mile (31.3/km^{2}). There were 81 housing units at an average density of 52.9 per square mile (20.4/km^{2}). The racial makeup of the village was 98.4% White and 1.6% from two or more races. Hispanic or Latino of any race were 2.4% of the population.

There were 51 households, of which 37.3% had children under the age of 18 living with them, 51.0% were married couples living together, 9.8% had a female householder with no husband present, 3.9% had a male householder with no wife present, and 35.3% were non-families. 29.4% of all households were made up of individuals, and 11.8% had someone living alone who was 65 years of age or older. The average household size was 2.43 and the average family size was 3.06.

The median age in the village was 39 years. 26.6% of residents were under the age of 18; 4.9% were between the ages of 18 and 24; 26.6% were from 25 to 44; 26.6% were from 45 to 64; and 15.3% were 65 years of age or older. The gender makeup of the village was 49.2% male and 50.8% female.

=== 2000 census ===
As of the census of 2000, there were 112 people, 49 households, and 31 families living in the village. The population density was 78.3 inhabitants per square mile (30.2/km^{2}). There were 89 housing units at an average density of 62.2 per square mile (24.0/km^{2}). The racial makeup of the village was 100.00% White.

There were 49 households, out of which 18.4% had children under the age of 18 living with them, 51.0% were married couples living together, 12.2% had a female householder with no husband present, and 36.7% were non-families. 28.6% of all households were made up of individuals, and 16.3% had someone living alone who was 65 years of age or older. The average household size was 2.29 and the average family size was 2.77.

In the village, the population was spread out, with 22.3% under the age of 18, 5.4% from 18 to 24, 21.4% from 25 to 44, 22.3% from 45 to 64, and 28.6% who were 65 years of age or older. The median age was 45 years. For every 100 females, there were 75.0 males. For every 100 females age 18 and over, there were 74.0 males.

The median income for a household in the village was $30,278, and the median income for a family was $27,500. Males had a median income of $22,188 versus $17,500 for females. The per capita income for the village was $11,377. There were 17.5% of families and 19.7% of the population living below the poverty line, including 34.8% of under eighteens and 14.3% of those over 64.

== Education ==
It is in the Roscoe C-1 School District, an elementary school district.
