= Warren Love =

American politician

Member of the Missouri House of Representatives from the 125th district
- In office 2013–2017
- Preceded by: Barney Fisher
- Succeeded by: Jim Kalberloh

Personal details
- Born: February 3, 1950 (age 76) Osceola, Missouri, U.S.
- Party: Republican
- Spouse: Marla
- Children: 4

Warren Love (born February 3, 1950) is an American politician who served as a member of the Missouri House of Representatives for the 125th district from 2013 to 2017. He is a member of the Republican Party. On August 30, 2017, Love made a controversial statement on Facebook, stating that those who vandalized a Confederate statue of General Sterling Price at the National Cemetery in Springfield, Missouri be "hung from a tall tree with a long rope".
