= Catherine Kidwell =

American novelist

- Born: January 14, 1921; Lowry City, Missouri
- Died: February 17, 2002 (aged 81)
- Education: University of Nebraska–Lincoln
- Writing career
- Language: English
- Period: 1979–1986

Catherine Arthelia Kidwell (January 14, 1921 – February 17, 2002) was an American novelist who began her career in writing late in her life, and was best known for her semi-autobiographical novel Dear Stranger.

Born in Lowry City, Missouri, Kidwell enrolled at the University of Nebraska–Lincoln in 1969, together with her daughter Jane. She culminated her studies with a Master of Fine Arts degree in 1977 at the age of 56. Her thesis, The Woman I Am, was published as a Dell paperback. Kidwell then developed the story further and turned it into the novel Dear Stranger, which Warner Books published in February 1983 and was chosen as a Literary Guild selection.

She continued to write and to teach writing at Southeast Community College in Lincoln; she died at the age of 81, after a struggle with Parkinson's disease.

== Bibliography ==
- The Woman I Am (1979)
- Dear Stranger (1982)
- "I Couldn't Put It Down": How to Write Quality Fiction in Ten Easy Lessons (1986)
