= Taberville, Missouri =

Unincorporated community in Missouri, U.S.

Coordinates: 38°00′30″N 93°59′41″W

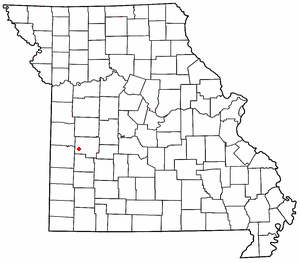

Taberville is an unincorporated community in southwestern St. Clair County, Missouri, United States. It is located approximately sixteen miles west of Osceola, situated on the north side of the Osage River. Taberville formerly had a post office, but it has closed and mail is now delivered from nearby Rockville.

Taberville was originally called Manoa, and under the latter name was platted in 1859. A post office called Taberville was established in 1866, and remained in operation until 1968. The present name is after one Dr. Tabor, the original owner of the town site.The original map misspelled Dr Tabor's name, thus it became Taberville. Before the Louisiana purchase, the location was the site of Fort Manoa, established by the French and Spanish for trade with the Osage tribe there, at the same time that Fort Carondolet was built near Harmony Mission slightly upriver from Schell City.
