= Straight Branch (Spencer Creek tributary) =

Stream in the American state of Missouri

Coordinates: 39.423097°N 91.559601°W

Straight Branch is a stream in Ralls County in the U.S. state of Missouri. It is a tributary of Spencer Creek.

Straight Branch was so named on account of its relatively straight watercourse.

== See also ==
- List of rivers of Missouri
