= USS Osceola =

USS Osceola has been the name of more than one United States Navy ship, and may refer to:

- USS Osceola (1863), a gunboat in commission from 1864 to 1865
- USS Osceola, a monitor which carried that name from 1869 to 1873 and had been named USS Neosho from 1863 to 1869 and USS Vixen briefly in 1869.
- USS Osceola (AT-47), an armed seagoing tug in commission in 1898 (seeing combat in the Spanish–American War) and from 1911 to 1922
- USS Osceola (YT-129), later YTB-129, later YTM-129, a harbor tug commissioned in 1938 and sold for scrapping in 1973
