= Miranda, South Dakota =

Unincorporated community in South Dakota, U.S.

Coordinates: 44°58′19″N 98°57′51″W

Miranda is an unincorporated community in Faulk County, in the U.S. state of South Dakota that was platted in 1886.

The community was named for the mother of a railroad official.

Miranda contained a post office from 1887 until 1985.
