= Crisp, Missouri =

Extinct hamlet in Missouri, U.S.

Coordinates: 37°34′11″N 93°47′17″W

Crisp is an extinct town in Dade County, in the U.S. state of Missouri. The GNIS classifies it as a populated place.

A post office called Crisp was established in 1893, and remained in operation until 1957. The community was named after John Crisp, a pioneer citizen.
