= Santiago, Missouri =

- Unincorporated community
- Location within Missouri Location within the United States
- Coordinates: 38°25′37″N 93°27′25″W
- Country: United States
- State: Missouri
- County: Benton
- Elevation: 843 ft (257 m)
- Time zone: UTC-6 (Central (CST))
  - Summer (DST): UTC-5 (CDT)
- Area code: 660
- GNIS feature ID: 741241

Santiago is an unincorporated community in Benton County, Missouri, United States. Santiago is located along Supplemental Route E, 7.1 miles (11.4 km) west-northwest of Lincoln.

A post office called Santiago was established in 1899, and remained in operation until 1904. The community's name commemorates the Battle of Santiago de Cuba.
