= Collins Township, St. Clair County, Missouri =

Inactive township in the American state of Missouri

Coordinates: 37.8717°N 93.6381°W

Collins Township is an inactive township in St. Clair County, in the U.S. state of Missouri.

Collins Township was erected in 1872, taking its name from William Collins, a local judge.
