= Tiffin (book) =

2018 cookbook by Sonal Ved

First edition

Tiffin: 500 Authentic Recipes Celebrating India's Regional Cuisine is a cookbook written by Sonal Ved and published by Roli Books in 2018. The book consists of recipes from Indian cuisine and is divided regionally.

== Synopsis ==
Tiffin consists of 500 recipes of the Indian cuisine and hyper-regionally divided. It includes recipes of the temple cuisines, street foods, tribal dishes and many other dishes which are not commonly used. For the book, author has taken the help of her mother, grandmother, friends, aunts and many other people who know India's regional cooking.

== Reception ==
Tiffin was listed under "19 best cookbooks of fall 2018" by The New York Times. Hindustan Times listed the book under "most interesting books of the week" on 19 October 2018.

Tanu Ganguly, reviewing the book in NDTV, called it a "must read". According to them, the book, "if enjoyed the way it is intended to, should serve the purpose of transporting you hundreds of kilometres away from your own home, into the kitchens of fellow Indians, where food is equally tasty, wholesome and heart-warming".

Aatish Nath, writing for Indian fashion magazine Vogue India, has also praised the work and wrote that author was meticulous to ensure that every recipe includes exact formulations.
