= Appleton City, Missouri =

City in St. Clair County, Missouri, United States

- City
- Nickname: AC
- Location of Appleton City, Missouri
- Coordinates: 38°11′26″N 94°01′51″W
- Country: United States
- State: Missouri
- County: St. Clair
- Incorporated: 1870

Government
  - Type: 4th Class City
  - Mayor: Matt Smith

Area
  - Total: 1.15 sq mi (2.97 km^{2})
  - Land: 1.15 sq mi (2.97 km^{2})
  - Water: 0 sq mi (0.00 km^{2})
- Elevation: 873 ft (266 m)

Population (2020)
  - Total: 1,032
  - Density: 899/sq mi (347.2/km^{2})
- Time zone: UTC-6 (Central (CST))
  - Summer (DST): UTC-5 (CDT)
- ZIP code: 64724
- FIPS code: 29-01522
- GNIS feature ID: 2393969
- Website: www.acmogov.com

Appleton City is a city in St. Clair County, Missouri, United States. The population was 1,032 as of the 2020 census. It is the most populous city in St. Clair County.

== History ==
Appleton City was originally called Arlington, and under the latter name was platted in 1870. The present name is after D.S. Appleton (1824–1890) of the D. Appleton & Company, who contributed a $500 library to the city.

The Hudson City School was listed on the National Register of Historic Places in 2002.

== Demographics ==
Historical population
Census	Pop.	Note	%±
1880	1,034		—
1890	1,081		4.5%
1900	1,133		4.8%
1910	1,018		−10.2%
1920	1,262		24.0%
1930	1,136		−10.0%
1940	1,188		4.6%
1950	1,150		−3.2%
1960	1,075		−6.5%
1970	1,058		−1.6%
1980	1,257		18.8%
1990	1,280		1.8%
2000	1,314		2.7%
2010	1,127		−14.2%
2020	1,032		−8.4%
U.S. Decennial Census

=== 2010 census ===
As of the census of 2010, there were 1,127 people, 501 households, and 281 families residing in the city. The population density was 980.0 inhabitants per square mile (378.4/km^{2}). There were 617 housing units at an average density of 536.5 per square mile (207.1/km^{2}). The racial makeup of the city was 96.8% White, 0.6% African American, 0.5% Native American, 0.1% from other races, and 2.0% from two or more races. Hispanic or Latino of any race were 0.7% of the population.

There were 501 households, of which 26.3% had children under the age of 18 living with them, 44.1% were married couples living together, 9.2% had a female householder with no husband present, 2.8% had a male householder with no wife present, and 43.9% were non-families. 40.5% of all households were made up of individuals, and 24.6% had someone living alone who was 65 years of age or older. The average household size was 2.16 and the average family size was 2.91.

The median age in the city was 45.2 years. 21.2% of residents were under the age of 18; 7.6% were between the ages of 18 and 24; 21.1% were from 25 to 44; 24.1% were from 45 to 64; and 26% were 65 years of age or older. The gender makeup of the city was 47.6% male and 52.4% female.

=== 2000 census ===
As of the census of 2000, there were 1,314 people, 552 households, and 342 families residing in the city. The population density was 1,147.0 inhabitants per square mile (442.9/km^{2}). There were 635 housing units at an average density of 554.3 per square mile (214.0/km^{2}). The racial makeup of the city was 98.17% White, 0.08% Native American, 0.38% from other races, and 1.37% from two or more races. Hispanic or Latino of any race were 0.46% of the population.

There were 552 households, out of which 28.1% had children under the age of 18 living with them, 48.4% were married couples living together, 10.1% had a female householder with no husband present, and 38.0% were non-families. 36.1% of all households were made up of individuals, and 23.0% had someone living alone who was 65 years of age or older. The average household size was 2.25 and the average family size was 2.89.

In the city the population was spread out, with 25.1% under the age of 18, 5.9% from 18 to 24, 22.3% from 25 to 44, 19.3% from 45 to 64, and 27.5% who were 65 years of age or older. The median age was 43 years. For every 100 females there were 82.8 males. For every 100 females age 18 and over, there were 71.4 males.

The median income for a household in the city was $23,674, and the median income for a family was $30,365. Males had a median income of $25,000 versus $18,864 for females. The per capita income for the city was $12,566. About 16.5% of families and 23.1% of the population were below the poverty line, including 32.4% of those under age 18 and 18.9% of those age 65 or over.

== Geography ==
According to the United States Census Bureau, the city has a total area of 1.15 square miles (2.98 km^{2}), all land.

=== Climate ===
Climate data for Appleton City, Missouri (1991–2020 normals, extremes 1890–present)
Month	Jan	Feb	Mar	Apr	May	Jun	Jul	Aug	Sep	Oct	Nov	Dec	Year
Record high °F (°C)	77 (25)	83 (28)	92 (33)	94 (34)	100 (38)	110 (43)	116 (47)	112 (44)	107 (42)	100 (38)	90 (32)	75 (24)	116 (47)
Mean daily maximum °F (°C)	40.0 (4.4)	45.4 (7.4)	56.1 (13.4)	65.9 (18.8)	74.7 (23.7)	83.6 (28.7)	88.2 (31.2)	87.3 (30.7)	79.4 (26.3)	68.2 (20.1)	55.1 (12.8)	44.0 (6.7)	65.7 (18.7)
Daily mean °F (°C)	30.6 (−0.8)	35.1 (1.7)	45.2 (7.3)	54.9 (12.7)	64.8 (18.2)	73.9 (23.3)	78.4 (25.8)	77.0 (25.0)	68.7 (20.4)	57.1 (13.9)	44.9 (7.2)	34.8 (1.6)	55.4 (13.0)
Mean daily minimum °F (°C)	21.2 (−6.0)	24.9 (−3.9)	34.2 (1.2)	43.9 (6.6)	54.8 (12.7)	64.2 (17.9)	68.5 (20.3)	66.7 (19.3)	58.1 (14.5)	46.1 (7.8)	34.7 (1.5)	25.6 (−3.6)	45.2 (7.3)
Record low °F (°C)	−22 (−30)	−29 (−34)	−7 (−22)	13 (−11)	26 (−3)	41 (5)	46 (8)	44 (7)	29 (−2)	18 (−8)	1 (−17)	−22 (−30)	−29 (−34)
Average precipitation inches (mm)	1.57 (40)	1.74 (44)	3.19 (81)	4.63 (118)	5.88 (149)	4.66 (118)	4.50 (114)	4.13 (105)	4.33 (110)	3.35 (85)	3.19 (81)	2.32 (59)	43.49 (1,105)
Average snowfall inches (cm)	3.8 (9.7)	2.3 (5.8)	1.3 (3.3)	0.0 (0.0)	0.0 (0.0)	0.0 (0.0)	0.0 (0.0)	0.0 (0.0)	0.0 (0.0)	0.0 (0.0)	0.3 (0.76)	2.1 (5.3)	9.8 (25)
Average precipitation days (≥ 0.01 in)	6.0	5.3	8.7	9.9	11.8	9.7	7.8	7.4	7.4	8.2	6.6	5.9	94.7
Average snowy days (≥ 0.1 in)	2.2	0.9	0.7	0.0	0.0	0.0	0.0	0.0	0.0	0.0	0.3	1.0	5.1
Source: NOAA

== Education ==
Appleton City R-II School District, which covers the entire municipality, operates one elementary school and Appleton City High School.

The school of the Hudson R-IX School District, Hudson R-IX Elementary School has an Appleton City postal address; that the school are in Hudson Township, Bates County, and the district is entirely in Bates County; the school and the district are not in and do not cover the Appleton City city limits.

The town has a public library, the Appleton City Library.

== Notable people ==
- Edward A. Babler, doctor and humanitarian after whom Babler State Park was named
- John Baldwin (1843–1934), politician
- Byron Calame (born 1939), journalist
- Ivah Wills Coburn (1878–1937), stage actress
- Donald L. Cox (1936–2011), member of the Black Panther Party
- William T. Holmes (1846–1916), soldier and Medal of Honor receptient
- Daniel C. Jackling (1869–1956), mining engineer
- Jim Kalberloh, politician
- Vester Pegg (1899–1951), silent film actor

== See also ==
- List of cities in Missouri
