= Vista, Missouri =

- Village
- Coordinates: 37°59′21″N 93°39′49″W
- Country: United States
- State: Missouri
- County: St. Clair

Area
  - Total: 0.13 sq mi (0.34 km^{2})
  - Land: 0.13 sq mi (0.34 km^{2})
  - Water: 0 sq mi (0.00 km^{2})
- Elevation: 853 ft (260 m)

Population (2020)
  - Total: 36
  - Density: 276/sq mi (106.4/km^{2})
- Time zone: UTC-6 (Central (CST))
  - Summer (DST): UTC-5 (CDT)
- ZIP code: 64776
- FIPS code: 29-76390
- GNIS feature ID: 2400076

Vista is a village in St. Clair County, Missouri, United States. The population was 36 at the 2020 census.

== History ==
Vista was platted in 1885, and named after Vista Dawson, the daughter of a first settler. A variant name was "Decherd". A post office called Decherd was established in 1887, the name was changed to Vista in 1889, and the post office closed in 1973.

== Geography ==
According to the United States Census Bureau, the village has a total area of 0.13 square miles (0.34 km^{2}), all land.

== Demographics ==
Historical population
Census	Pop.	Note	%±
1960	50		—
1970	44		−12.0%
1980	73		65.9%
1990	50		−31.5%
2000	55		10.0%
2010	54		−1.8%
2020	36		−33.3%
U.S. Decennial Census

=== 2010 census ===
As of the census of 2010, there were 54 people, 22 households, and 13 families residing in the village. The population density was 415.4 inhabitants per square mile (160.4/km^{2}). There were 25 housing units at an average density of 192.3 per square mile (74.2/km^{2}). The racial makeup of the village was 100.0% White.

There were 22 households, of which 36.4% had children under the age of 18 living with them, 54.5% were married couples living together, 4.5% had a female householder with no husband present, and 40.9% were non-families. 40.9% of all households were made up of individuals, and 13.6% had someone living alone who was 65 years of age or older. The average household size was 2.45 and the average family size was 3.38.

The median age in the village was 37 years. 35.2% of residents were under the age of 18; 3.7% were between the ages of 18 and 24; 20.4% were from 25 to 44; 26% were from 45 to 64; and 14.8% were 65 years of age or older. The gender makeup of the village was 48.1% male and 51.9% female.

== Education ==
It is in the Osceola School District.
