= Oceola Township, Michigan =

- Civil township
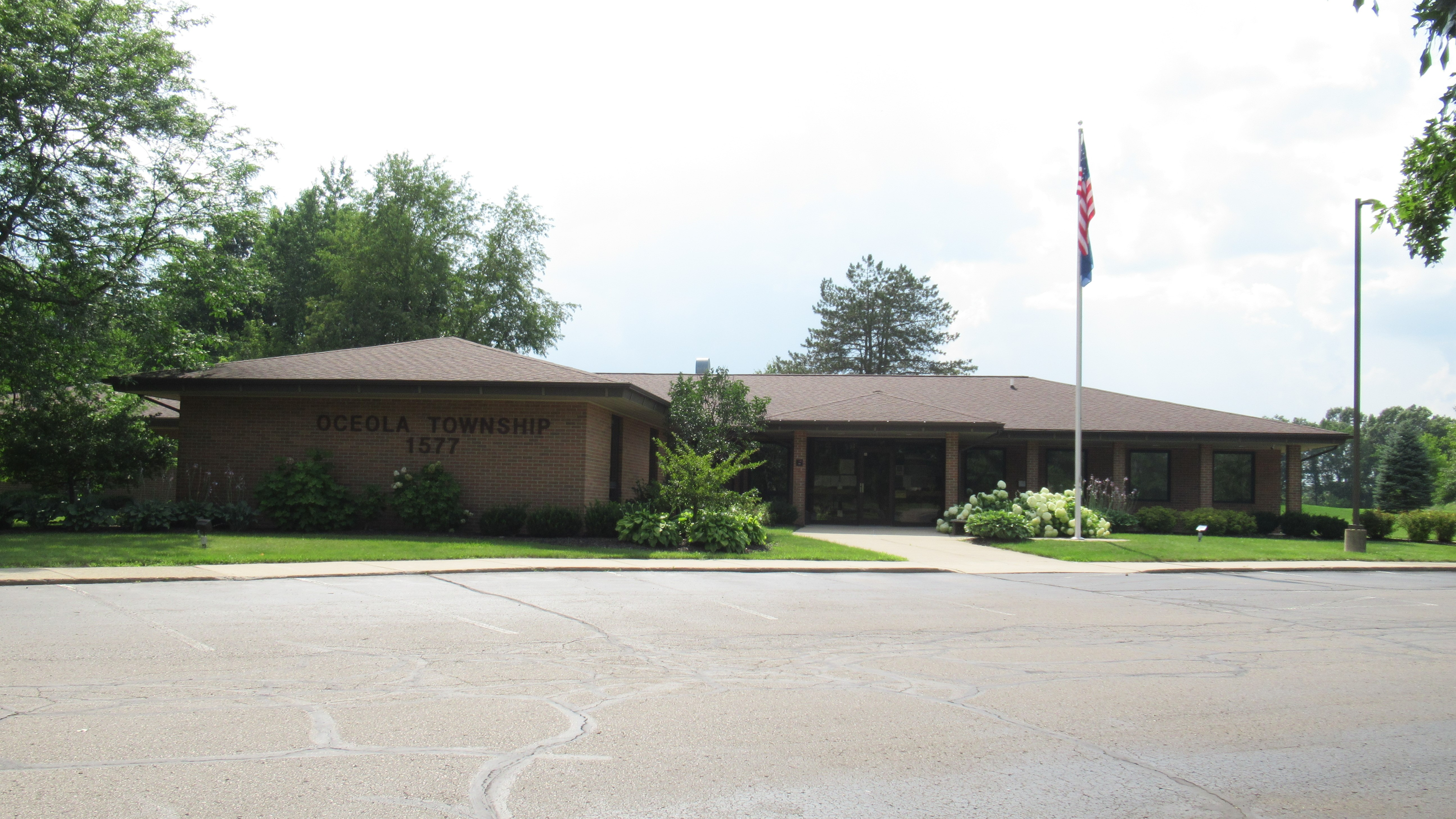
- Oceola Township Hall

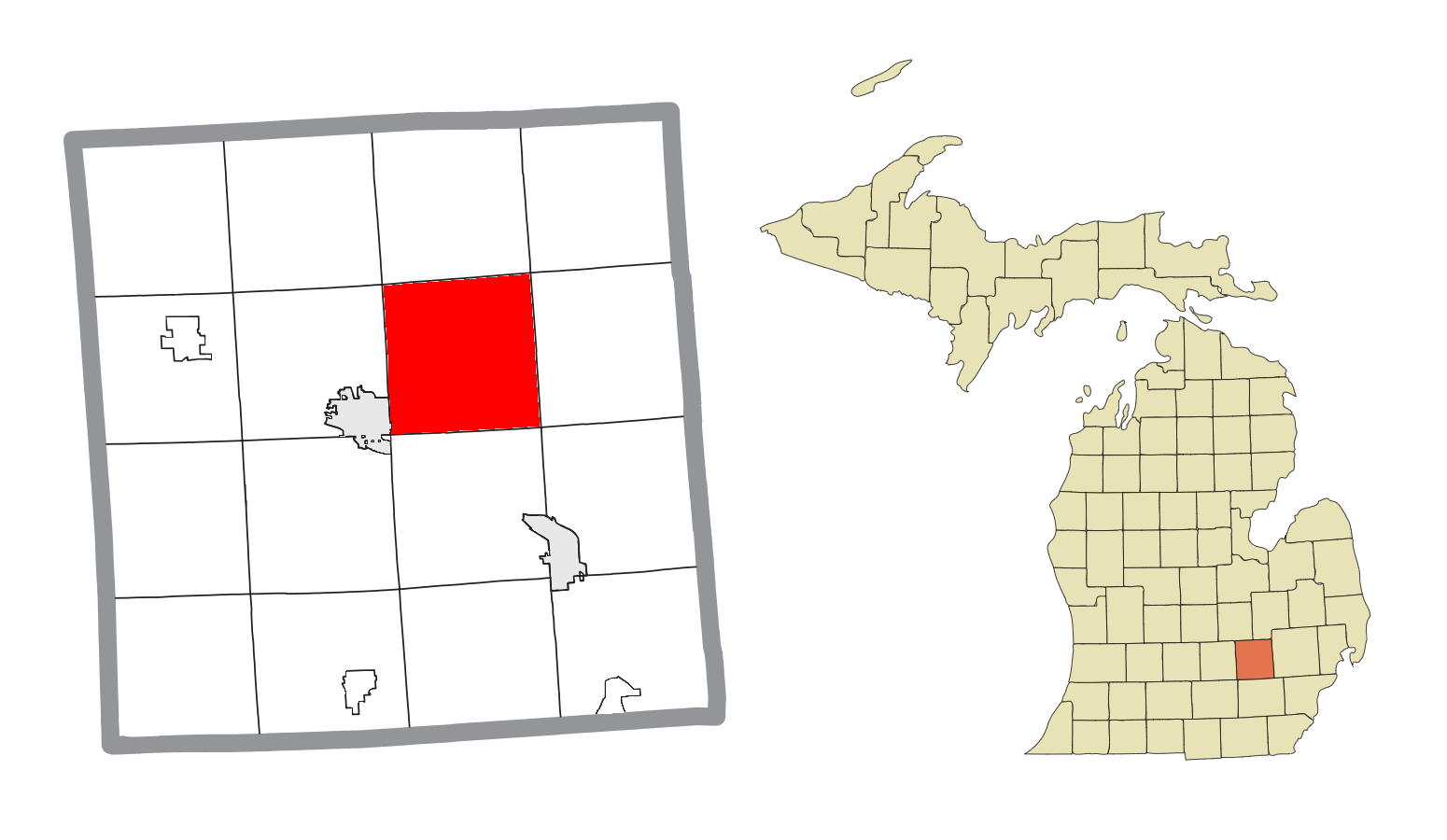
- Location within Livingston County

- Location in Michigan Location in the United States
- Coordinates: 42°38′00″N 83°52′00″W
- Country: United States
- State: Michigan
- County: Livingston

Government
  - Supervisor: William Bamber
  - Clerk: Jaime Clay

Area
  - Total: 36.8 sq mi (95.2 km^{2})
  - Land: 36.1 sq mi (93.6 km^{2})
  - Water: 0.62 sq mi (1.6 km^{2})
- Elevation: 955 ft (291 m)

Population (2020)
  - Total: 14,623
  - Density: 405/sq mi (156/km^{2})
- Time zone: UTC-5 (Eastern (EST))
  - Summer (DST): UTC-4 (EDT)
- ZIP code(s): 48430 (Fenton); 48843, 48855 (Howell)
- Area code: 517
- FIPS code: 26-60120
- GNIS feature ID: 1626835
- Website: www.oceolatwp.org

Oceola Township is a civil township of Livingston County in the U.S. state of Michigan. As of the 2020 census the population was 14,623, up from 11,936 at the 2010 census.

== Geography ==
The township is in central Livingston County and is bordered to the southwest by the city of Howell, the county seat. State highway M-59 crosses the township, leading east 30 miles (48 km) to Pontiac and west 7 miles (11 km) to its terminus at Interstate 96 west of Howell.

According to the United States Census Bureau, Oceola Township has a total area of 36.8 square miles (95.2 km^{2}), of which 36.1 square miles (93.6 km^{2}) are land and 0.62 square miles (1.6 km^{2}), or 1.73%, are water. The township is drained northwards by tributaries of the South Branch of the Shiawassee River.

== Demographics ==
As of the census of 2000, there were 8,362 people, 2,756 households, and 2,356 families residing in the township. The population density was 230.4 inhabitants per square mile (89.0/km^{2}). There were 2,944 housing units at an average density of 81.1 per square mile (31.3/km^{2}). The racial makeup was 97.12% White, 0.12% African American, 0.47% Native American, 0.63% Asian, 0.02% Pacific Islander, 0.23% from other races, and 1.41% from two or more races. Hispanic or Latino of any race were 1.15% of the population.

There were 2,756 households, out of which 47.9% had children under the age of 18 living with them, 76.3% were married couples living together, 6.4% had a female householder with no husband present, and 14.5% were non-families. 11.4% of all households were made up of individuals, and 2.8% had someone living alone who was 65 years of age or older. The average household size was 3.02 and the average family size was 3.28.

The population was spread out, with 32.1% under the age of 18, 5.2% from 18 to 24, 35.9% from 25 to 44, 21.1% from 45 to 64, and 5.7% who were 65 years of age or older. The median age was 34 years. For every 100 females, there were 102.5 males. For every 100 females age 18 and over, there were 100.8 males.

The median income for a household was $103,093, and the median income for a family was $80,286. Males had a median income of $58,636 versus $31,032 for females. The per capita income was $27,052. About 4.6% of families and 4.6% of the population were below the poverty line, including 6.4% of those under age 18 and 6.4% of those age 65 or over.
