= Chalk Level, Missouri =

Unincorporated community in Missouri, US

Coordinates: 38°05′36″N 93°48′35″W

Chalk Level (also spelled Chalklevel) is an unincorporated community in St. Clair County, in the U.S. state of Missouri.

== History ==
A post office called Chalk Level was established in 1848, and remained in operation until 1914. The community most likely was so named on account of the chalky character of the soil at the flat town site. It is also rumored that the city got its name from its "level headed" residents who could "chalk" it down. Another story pointed to a local carpenter who spent a lot of time chalking and leveling his buildings.
