= Straight Branch (Deepwater Creek tributary) =

Stream in Missouri, U.S.

Coordinates: 38°15′01″N 94°09′59″W

Straight Branch is a tributary of South Deepwater Creek in Bates County, in the U.S. state of Missouri.

Straight Branch was so named because of its relatively straight watercourse.

== See also ==
- List of rivers of Missouri
