= St. Clair County, Missouri =

County in Missouri, United States

- County
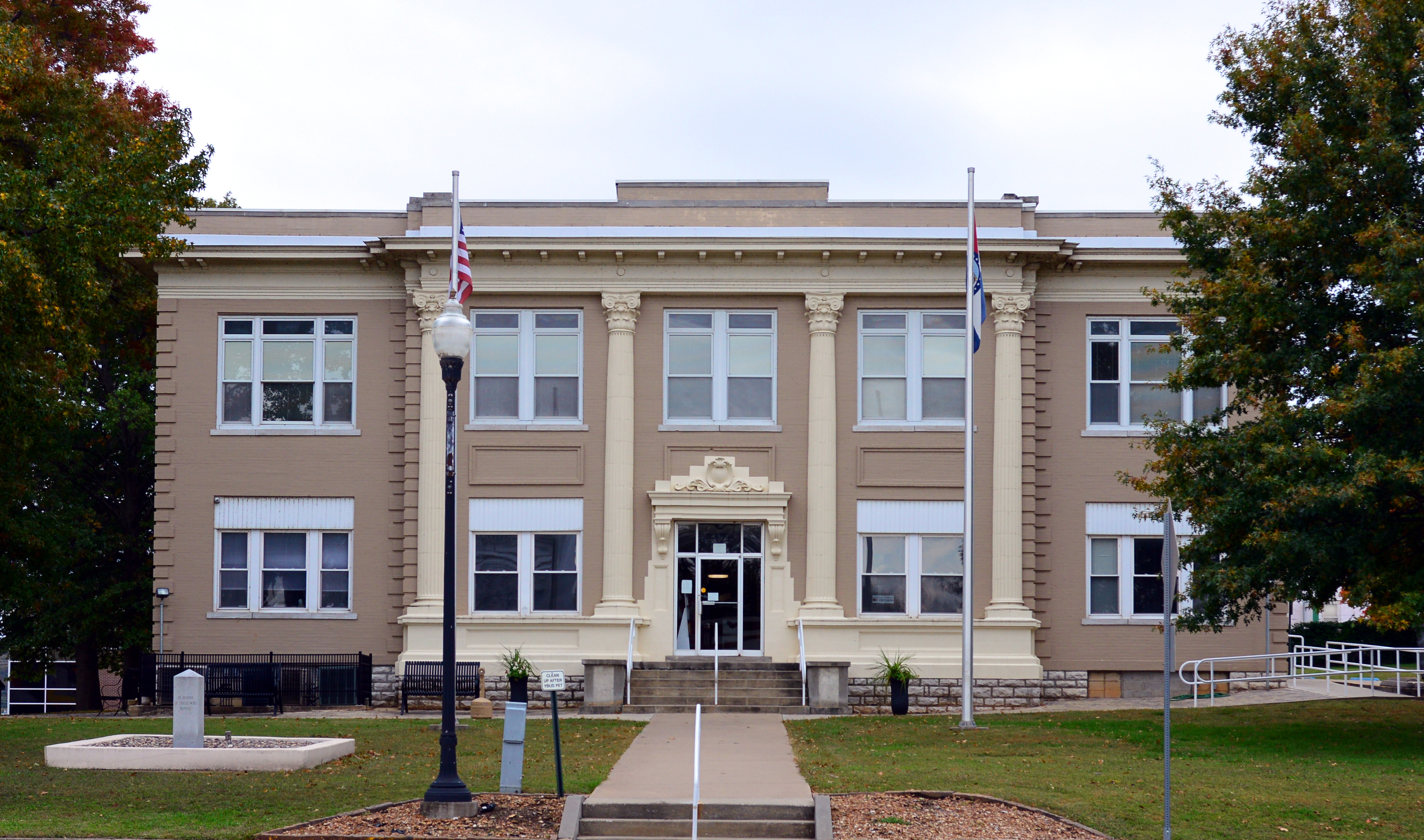
- St. Clair County courthouse in Osceola

- Location within the U.S. state of Missouri
- Coordinates: 38°02′N 93°46′W
- Country: United States
- State: Missouri
- Founded: January 29, 1841
- Named for: Arthur St. Clair
- Seat: Osceola
- Largest city: Appleton City

Area
  - Total: 702 sq mi (1,820 km^{2})
  - Land: 670 sq mi (1,700 km^{2})
  - Water: 32 sq mi (83 km^{2}) 4.6%

Population (2020)
  - Total: 9,284
  - Estimate (2025): 9,976 ▲
  - Density: 14.9/sq mi (5.8/km^{2})
- Time zone: UTC−6 (Central)
  - Summer (DST): UTC−5 (CDT)
- Congressional district: 4th
- Website: www.stclaircomo.com

St. Clair County is a county located in the western portion of the U.S. state of Missouri. As of the 2020 census, the population was 9,284. Its county seat is Osceola. The largest city is Appleton City. The county was organized in 1841 and named after General Arthur St. Clair, Governor of the Northwest Territory. St. Clair was also the 9th president of the United States in Congress Assembled. Under his presidency, the Northwest Ordinance and United States Constitution were passed.

According to the April 1907 issue of The Century Magazine, for well over 30 years (dating from 1870) St. Clair County was in open rebellion against the U.S. Government, refusing to pay interest on bonds issued to assist in the building of a railroad that was never built.

== Geography ==
According to the U.S. Census Bureau, the county has a total area of 702 square miles (1,820 km^{2}), of which 670 square miles (1,700 km^{2}) is land and 32 square miles (83 km^{2}) (4.6%) is water.

=== Adjacent counties ===
- Henry County (north)
- Benton County (northeast)
- Hickory County (east)
- Polk County (southeast)
- Cedar County (south)
- Vernon County (southwest)
- Bates County (northwest)

=== Major highways ===
- U.S. Route 54
- Route 13
- Route 52
- Route 82

=== Transit ===
- Jefferson Lines

== Demographics ==
Historical population
Census	Pop.	Note	%±
1850	3,556		—
1860	6,812		91.6%
1870	6,742		−1.0%
1880	14,125		109.5%
1890	16,747		18.6%
1900	17,907		6.9%
1910	16,412		−8.3%
1920	15,341		−6.5%
1930	13,289		−13.4%
1940	13,146		−1.1%
1950	10,482		−20.3%
1960	8,421		−19.7%
1970	7,667		−9.0%
1980	8,622		12.5%
1990	8,457		−1.9%
2000	9,652		14.1%
2010	9,805		1.6%
2020	9,284		−5.3%
2025 (est.)	9,976	▲	7.5%
U.S. Decennial Census; 1790–1960 1900–90; 1990–2000 2010–2015 2025

=== 2020 census ===
As of the 2020 census, the county had a population of 9,284. The median age was 48.4 years, with 21.3% of residents under the age of 18 and 25.8% aged 65 or older. For every 100 females there were 102.7 males, and for every 100 females age 18 and over there were 101.3 males.

The racial makeup of the county was 93.1% White, 0.3% Black or African American, 0.7% American Indian and Alaska Native, 0.2% Asian, 0.1% Native Hawaiian and Pacific Islander, 0.7% from some other race, and 4.9% from two or more races. Hispanic or Latino residents of any race comprised 1.9% of the population.

St. Clair County, Missouri – Racial and ethnic composition Note: the US Census treats Hispanic/Latino as an ethnic category. This table excludes Latinos from the racial categories and assigns them to a separate category. Hispanics/Latinos may be of any race.
Race / Ethnicity (NH = Non-Hispanic)	Pop 1980	Pop 1990	Pop 2000	Pop 2010	Pop 2020	% 1980	% 1990	% 2000	% 2010	% 2020
White alone (NH)	8,510	8,356	9,338	9,366	8,567	98.70%	98.81%	96.75%	95.52%	92.28%
Black or African American alone (NH)	17	22	20	47	26	0.20%	0.26%	0.21%	0.48%	0.28%
Native American or Alaska Native alone (NH)	58	41	72	58	63	0.67%	0.48%	0.75%	0.59%	0.68%
Asian alone (NH)	5	5	14	12	19	0.06%	0.06%	0.15%	0.12%	0.20%
Native Hawaiian or Pacific Islander alone (NH)	x	x	2	1	7	x	x	0.02%	0.01%	0.08%
Other race alone (NH)	0	0	4	1	23	0.00%	0.00%	0.04%	0.01%	0.25%
Mixed race or Multiracial (NH)	x	x	107	150	401	x	x	1.11%	1.53%	4.32%
Hispanic or Latino (any race)	32	33	95	170	178	0.37%	0.39%	0.98%	1.73%	1.92%
Total	8,622	8,457	9,652	9,805	9,284	100.00%	100.00%	100.00%	100.00%	100.00%

0.0% of residents lived in urban areas, while 100.0% lived in rural areas.

There were 3,928 households in the county, of which 23.3% had children under the age of 18 living with them and 23.3% had a female householder with no spouse or partner present. About 31.8% of all households were made up of individuals and 17.1% had someone living alone who was 65 years of age or older.

There were 5,288 housing units, of which 25.7% were vacant. Among occupied housing units, 76.0% were owner-occupied and 24.0% were renter-occupied. The homeowner vacancy rate was 1.6% and the rental vacancy rate was 10.7%.

=== 2000 census ===
As of the census of 2000, there were 9,652 people, 4,040 households, and 2,791 families residing in the county. The population density was 14 people per square mile (5.4 people/km^{2}). There were 5,205 housing units at an average density of 8 units per square mile (3.1/km^{2}). The racial makeup of the county was 97.36% White, 0.23% Black or African American, 0.75% Native American, 0.15% Asian, 0.02% Pacific Islander, 0.29% from other races, and 1.21% from two or more races. Approximately 0.98% of the population were Hispanic or Latino of any race.

There were 4,040 households, out of which 26.30% had children under the age of 18 living with them, 57.60% were married couples living together, 7.70% had a female householder with no husband present, and 30.90% were non-families. 27.40% of all households were made up of individuals, and 14.80% had someone living alone who was 65 years of age or older. The average household size was 2.34 and the average family size was 2.83.

In the county, the population was spread out, with 23.00% under the age of 18, 5.60% from 18 to 24, 22.90% from 25 to 44, 27.20% from 45 to 64, and 21.30% who were 65 years of age or older. The median age was 44 years. For every 100 females there were 98.60 males. For every 100 females age 18 and over, there were 94.30 males.

The median income for a household in the county was $25,321, and the median income for a family was $31,498. Males had a median income of $23,231 versus $18,351 for females. The per capita income for the county was $14,025. About 16.20% of families and 19.60% of the population were below the poverty line, including 25.30% of those under age 18 and 17.60% of those age 65 or over.

== Education ==
K-12 school districts with portions in the county, including those with administration buildings and/or schools in other counties, include:

- Appleton City R-II School District
- El Dorado Springs R-II School District
- Humansville R-IV School District
- Lakeland R-III School District
- Osceola School District
- Weaubleau R-III School District

The county has a single elementary school district, Roscoe C-1 School District.

=== Public schools ===
- Appleton City R-II School District – Appleton City
  - Appleton City Elementary School (K–5)
  - Appleton City High School (06-12)
- Osceola Public Schools – Osceola
  - Osceola Elementary School (PK–6)
  - Osceola High School (7–12)
- Roscoe C-1 School District – Roscoe
  - Roscoe Elementary School (PK–8)
- Lakeland R-III School District – Lowry City and Deepwater
  - Lakeland Elementary School

The school of the Hudson R-IX School District, Hudson R-IX Elementary School, has an Appleton City postal address; that school is in Hudson Township, Bates County, and the district is entirely in Bates County; the district and school are not in and do not cover the Appleton City city limits nor any portion of St. Clair County.

=== Public libraries ===
- Appleton City Public Library
- St. Clair County Library-Main Library (Osceola)
- St. Clair County Library-Lowry City Branch

== Communities ==
=== Cities ===
- Appleton City
- Lowry City
- Osceola (county seat)

=== Villages ===
- Collins
- Gerster
- Roscoe
- Vista

=== Unincorporated communities ===
- Chalk Level
- Cobb
- Crooks Springs
- Harper
- Iconium
- Johnson City
- Monegaw Springs
- Ohio
- Oyer
- Pape
- Raney
- Taberville
- Tiffin

=== Townships ===
St. Clair County is divided into 16 townships:

- Appleton Township
- Butler Township
- Center Township
- Chalk Level Township
- Collins Township
- Dallas Township
- Doyal Township
- Jackson Township
- Monegaw Township
- Osage Township
- Osceola Township
- Polk Township
- Roscoe Township
- Speedwell Township
- Taber Township
- Washington Township

== Politics ==
=== Local ===
The Republican Party predominantly controls politics at the local level in St. Clair County.

St. Clair County, Missouri

Elected countywide officials
Assessor	George Lysinger	Republican
Circuit Clerk	Karen Hubbard	Democratic
County Clerk	Holly Fletcher	Republican
Collector	Pam Guffey	Republican
Commissioner (presiding)	Robert Salmon	Republican
Commissioner (district 1)	Matt Noakes	Republican
Commissioner (district 2)	Randy Smith	Republican
Coroner	C. Randy Shelton	Republican
Prosecuting Attorney	Daniel Dysart	Republican
Public Administrator	David Knight	Republican
Recorder	Mandy Jackson	Republican
Sheriff	Lee Hilty	Republican
Treasurer	Rhonda Shelby	Republican

=== State ===
Past gubernatorial elections results
Year	Republican	Democratic	Third Parties
2024	78.01% 3,887	20.11% 1,002	1.88% 94
2020	78.01% 3,880	20.00% 995	1.99% 99
2016	62.86% 2,927	33.51% 1,560	3.63% 169
2012	50.33% 2,335	45.72% 2,121	3.95% 183
2008	41.90% 2,093	54.73% 2,734	3.36% 168
2004	58.21% 2,888	40.40% 2,004	1.39% 69
2000	50.73% 2,405	47.35% 2,245	1.92% 91
1996	42.91% 1,909	54.37% 2,419	2.72% 121

All of St. Clair County is a part of Missouri's 125th District in the Missouri House of Representatives and is represented by Warren Love (R-Osceola).

Missouri House of Representatives — District 125 — St. Clair County (2016)
Party	Candidate	Votes	%	±%
Republican	Warren D. Love	3,965	100.00%	

Missouri House of Representatives — District 125 — St. Clair County (2014)
Party	Candidate	Votes	%	±%
Republican	Warren D. Love	2,447	100.00%	

Missouri House of Representatives — District 125 — St. Clair County (2012)
Party	Candidate	Votes	%	±%
Republican	Warren D. Love	3,685	100.00%	

All of St. Clair County is a part of Missouri's 28th District in the Missouri Senate. The seat is currently Held by Sandy Crawford.

Missouri Senate — District 28 — St. Clair County (2014)
Party	Candidate	Votes	%	±%
Republican	Mike Parson	2,616	100.00%	

=== Federal ===
U.S. Senate — Missouri — St. Clair County (2016)
Party	Candidate	Votes	%	±%
Republican	Roy Blunt	2,941	63.19%	+17.07
Democratic	Jason Kander	1,460	31.37%	−14.08
Libertarian	Jonathan Dine	138	2.97%	−5.46
Green	Johnathan McFarland	45	0.97%	+0.97
Constitution	Fred Ryman	70	1.50%	+1.50

U.S. Senate — Missouri — St. Clair County (2012)
Party	Candidate	Votes	%	±%
Republican	Todd Akin	2,132	46.12%	
Democratic	Claire McCaskill	2,101	45.45%	
Libertarian	Jonathan Dine	390	8.43%	

All of St. Clair County is included in Missouri's 4th Congressional District and is currently represented by Vicky Hartzler (R-Harrisonville) in the U.S. House of Representatives.

U.S. House of Representatives — Missouri's 4th Congressional District — St. Clair County (2016)
Party	Candidate	Votes	%	±%
Republican	Vicky Hartzler	3,438	74.59%	+1.25
Democratic	Gordon Christensen	993	21.55%	−0.73
Libertarian	Mark Bliss	178	3.86%	−0.52

U.S. House of Representatives — Missouri's 4th Congressional District — St. Clair County (2014)
Party	Candidate	Votes	%	±%
Republican	Vicky Hartzler	2,278	73.34%	+7.37
Democratic	Nate Irvin	692	22.28%	−8.03
Libertarian	Herschel L. Young	136	4.38%	+1.73

U.S. House of Representatives — Missouri’s 4th Congressional District — St. Clair County (2012)
Party	Candidate	Votes	%	±%
Republican	Vicky Hartzler	3,036	65.97%	
Democratic	Teresa Hensley	1,395	30.31%	
Libertarian	Thomas Holbrook	122	2.65%	
Constitution	Greg Cowan	49	1.07%	

==== Political culture ====
United States presidential election results for St. Clair County, Missouri
Year	Republican		Democratic		Third party(ies)	
Year	No.	%	No.	%	No.	%
1888	1,635	44.33%	1,697	46.01%	356	9.65%
1892	1,510	40.79%	1,572	42.46%	620	16.75%
1896	1,829	40.30%	2,686	59.19%	23	0.51%
1900	1,844	44.91%	2,036	49.59%	226	5.50%
1904	1,895	49.65%	1,761	46.14%	161	4.22%
1908	1,723	46.50%	1,877	50.66%	105	2.83%
1912	1,046	28.14%	1,710	46.00%	961	25.85%
1916	1,718	45.80%	1,881	50.15%	152	4.05%
1920	3,249	56.94%	2,296	40.24%	161	2.82%
1924	2,907	49.70%	2,640	45.14%	302	5.16%
1928	3,846	68.88%	1,701	30.46%	37	0.66%
1932	2,271	37.71%	3,681	61.13%	70	1.16%
1936	3,351	50.13%	3,302	49.40%	31	0.46%
1940	3,950	57.80%	2,859	41.83%	25	0.37%
1944	3,306	60.87%	2,119	39.02%	6	0.11%
1948	2,548	50.52%	2,489	49.35%	7	0.14%
1952	3,465	64.17%	1,914	35.44%	21	0.39%
1956	3,018	57.84%	2,200	42.16%	0	0.00%
1960	3,196	63.15%	1,865	36.85%	0	0.00%
1964	1,961	43.06%	2,593	56.94%	0	0.00%
1968	2,271	54.36%	1,496	35.81%	411	9.84%
1972	2,847	66.88%	1,410	33.12%	0	0.00%
1976	1,808	44.07%	2,271	55.35%	24	0.58%
1980	2,419	57.46%	1,706	40.52%	85	2.02%
1984	2,667	61.71%	1,655	38.29%	0	0.00%
1988	2,312	55.27%	1,864	44.56%	7	0.17%
1992	1,555	33.72%	1,965	42.62%	1,091	23.66%
1996	1,815	40.58%	1,974	44.13%	684	15.29%
2000	2,731	57.63%	1,866	39.38%	142	3.00%
2004	3,098	62.40%	1,841	37.08%	26	0.52%
2008	2,981	59.76%	1,886	37.81%	121	2.43%
2012	3,019	65.26%	1,460	31.56%	147	3.18%
2016	3,501	75.62%	936	20.22%	193	4.17%
2020	3,932	79.05%	988	19.86%	54	1.09%
2024	3,982	79.80%	959	19.22%	49	0.98%

== See also ==
- National Register of Historic Places listings in St. Clair County, Missouri
