= Lowry City, Missouri =

City in St. Clair County, Missouri, United States

- City
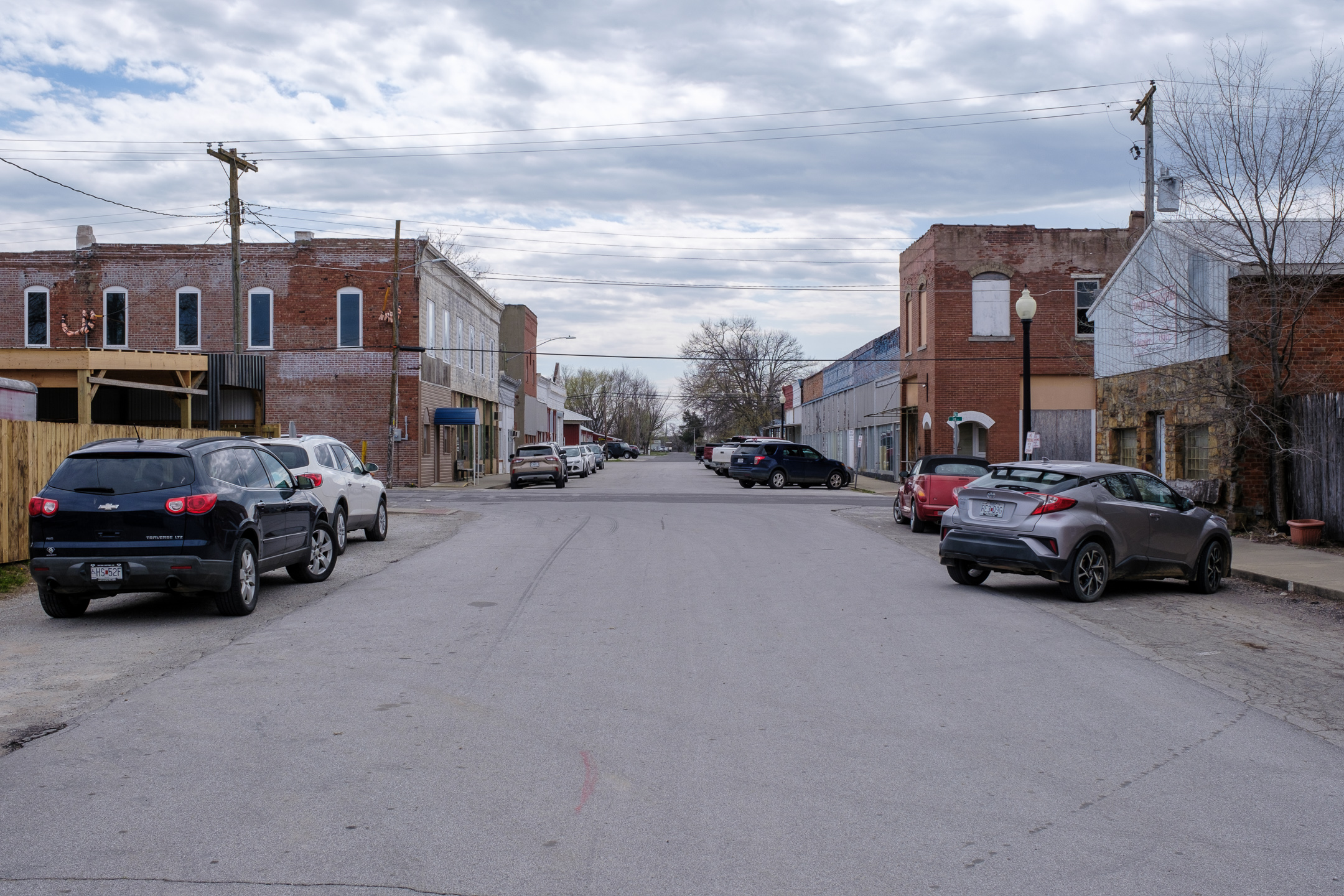

- Location of Lowry City, Missouri
- Coordinates: 38°08′24″N 93°43′39″W
- Country: United States
- State: Missouri
- County: St. Clair

Area
  - Total: 1.04 sq mi (2.70 km^{2})
  - Land: 1.03 sq mi (2.66 km^{2})
  - Water: 0.015 sq mi (0.04 km^{2})
- Elevation: 876 ft (267 m)

Population (2020)
  - Total: 613
  - Density: 597.6/sq mi (230.74/km^{2})
- Time zone: UTC-6 (Central (CST))
  - Summer (DST): UTC-5 (CDT)
- ZIP code: 64763
- FIPS code: 29-44282
- GNIS feature ID: 2395779
- Website: lowrycitymo.gov

Lowry City is a city in St. Clair County, Missouri, United States. The population was 613 at the 2020 census. Lowry City is the city where the Ozark Mountains meet the Great Plains.

== History ==
Lowry City was platted in 1871 when a railroad was built to connect Clinton and Osceola. The community was named by Jon Hancock after one Mr. Lowry, the business associate of a first settler A post office called Lowry City has been in operation since 1871. whom Hancock had previously clerked.

== Geography ==
According to the United States Census Bureau, the city has a total area of 1.04 square miles (2.69 km^{2}), of which 1.02 square miles (2.64 km^{2}) is land and 0.02 square miles (0.05 km^{2}) is water.

== Demographics ==
Historical population
Census	Pop.	Note	%±
1880	58		—
1890	368		534.5%
1900	467		26.9%
1910	462		−1.1%
1920	509		10.2%
1930	549		7.9%
1940	488		−11.1%
1950	493		1.0%
1960	437		−11.4%
1970	520		19.0%
1980	676		30.0%
1990	723		7.0%
2000	728		0.7%
2010	640		−12.1%
2020	613		−4.2%
U.S. Decennial Census

=== 2010 census ===
At the 2010 census, there were 640 people, 262 households and 146 families living in the city. The population density was 627.5 inhabitants per square mile (242.3/km^{2}). There were 326 housing units at an average density of 319.6 per square mile (123.4/km^{2}). The racial makeup of the city was 97.7% White, 0.2% African American, 0.9% Native American, and 1.3% from two or more races. Hispanic or Latino of any race were 1.9% of the population.

There were 262 households, of which 24.4% had children under the age of 18 living with them, 38.2% were married couples living together, 11.1% had a female householder with no husband present, 6.5% had a male householder with no wife present, and 44.3% were non-families. 38.9% of all households were made up of individuals, and 19% had someone living alone who was 65 years of age or older. The average household size was 2.21 and the average family size was 2.92.

The median age in the city was 47.9 years. 21.1% of residents were under the age of 18; 5.7% were between the ages of 18 and 24; 20.1% were from 25 to 44; 23% were from 45 to 64; and 30.2% were 65 years of age or older. The gender makeup of the city was 48.8% male and 51.3% female.

=== 2000 census ===
At the 2000 census, there were 728 people, 301 households and 168 families living in the city. The population density was 712.6 inhabitants per square mile (275.1/km^{2}). There were 356 housing units at an average density of 348.5 per square mile (134.6/km^{2}). The racial makeup of the city was 98.63% White, 0.14% African American, 0.41% Native American, 0.14% Asian, 0.14% from other races, and 0.55% from two or more races. Hispanic or Latino of any race were 2.34% of the population.

There were 301 households, of which 25.9% had children under the age of 18 living with them, 41.9% were married couples living together, 9.6% had a female householder with no husband present, and 43.9% were non-families. 38.5% of all households were made up of individuals, and 21.9% had someone living alone who was 65 years of age or older. The average household size was 2.20 and the average family size was 2.89.

22.1% of the population were under the age of 18, 6.5% from 18 to 24, 22.4% from 25 to 44, 19.5% from 45 to 64, and 29.5% who were 65 years of age or older. The median age was 44 years. For every 100 females there were 84.8 males. For every 100 females age 18 and over, there were 80.6 males.

The median household income was $19,438 and the median family income was $28,854. Males had a median income of $23,125 and females $17,135. The per capita income for the city was $10,968. About 15.5% of families and 22.1% of the population were below the poverty line, including 18.5% of those under age 18 and 24.7% of those age 65 or over.

== Education ==
It is in the Lakeland R-III School District.

== Notable people ==
- Teea Goans, country singer
- Catherine Kidwell, novelist
- Delbert Lee Scott, politician, college president

== See also ==
- List of cities in Missouri
