= Osceola, Missouri =

City in Missouri, U.S.

- City
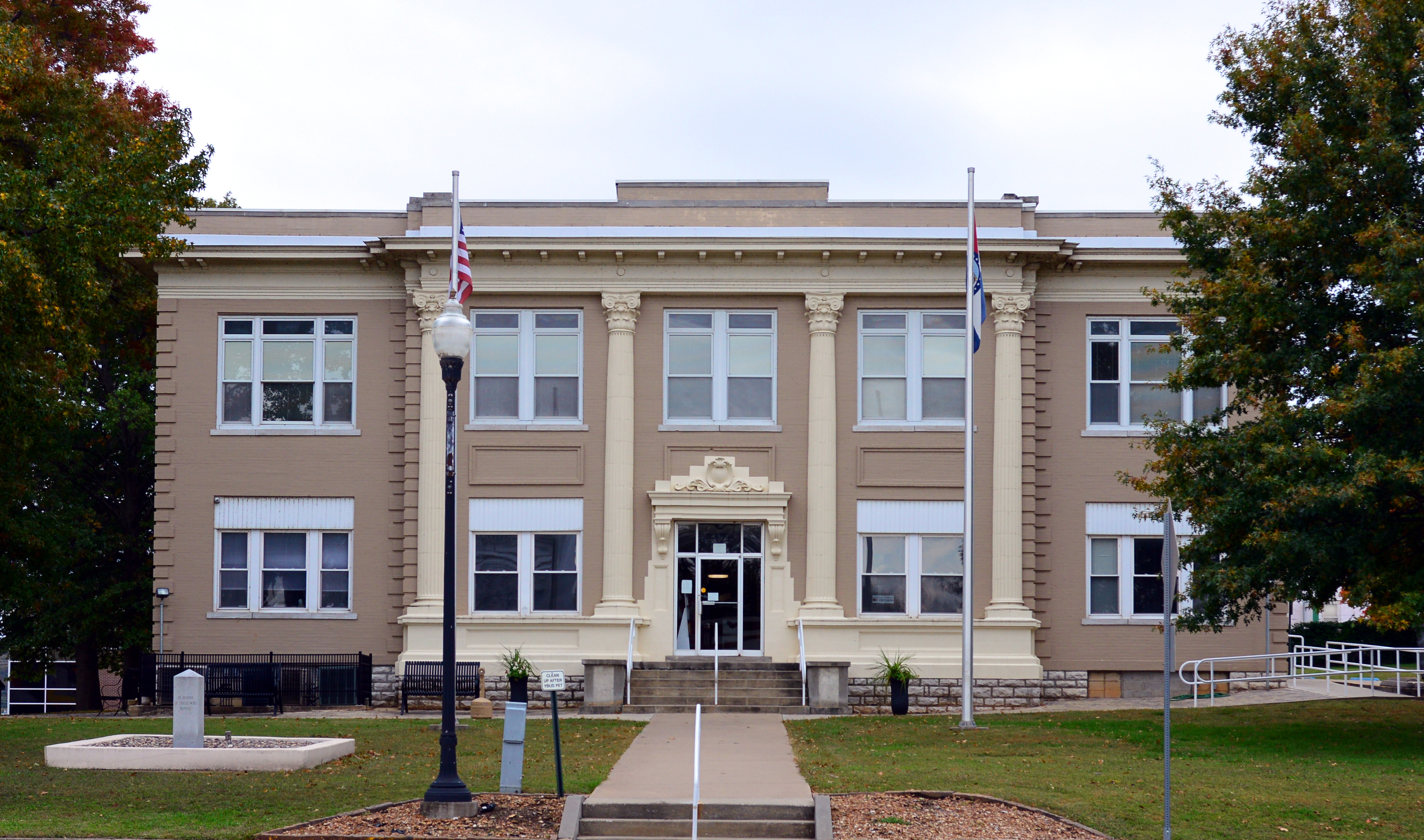
- St. Clair County Courthouse

- Location of Osceola, Missouri
- Coordinates: 38°02′44″N 93°41′50″W
- Country: United States
- State: Missouri
- County: St. Clair

Area
  - Total: 1.04 sq mi (2.70 km^{2})
  - Land: 1.02 sq mi (2.63 km^{2})
  - Water: 0.023 sq mi (0.06 km^{2})
- Elevation: 748 ft (228 m)

Population (2020)
  - Total: 909
  - Density: 890/sq mi (345/km^{2})
- Time zone: UTC-6 (Central (CST))
  - Summer (DST): UTC-5 (CDT)
- ZIP Code: 64776
- FIPS code: 29-55388
- GNIS ID: 2396092

Osceola (/ˈoʊsioʊlə/ OH-see-oh-lə) is a city in and the county seat of St. Clair County, Missouri, United States. The population was 909 at the 2020 census. During the American Civil War, Osceola was the site of the Sacking of Osceola.

== History ==
Located on the Osage River, the land that became the town of Osceola was inhabited by the tribe of Osage Native Americans, also known as NiuKonska, Native Americans who gave the river its name. NiuKonska means "Little Ones of the Middle Waters". Two treaties, in 1808 and 1825, signed by the Osage and the U.S. government gave up all the tribe's land in Missouri. With the way cleared for non-native settlers, more people began to arrive in the St. Clair County area in the mid-1830s. The town is named after the famous Seminole Chief Osceola. The name was first used at a Town Board meeting on March 30, 1859.

The town was the site of the September 1861 Sacking of Osceola by Jayhawkers (anti-slavery patrols) in which the town was burned and its courthouse looted. The town of 2,077 people was plundered and burned to the ground, 200 slaves were freed and nine local citizens were court-martialed and executed. The event inspired the 1976 Clint Eastwood film The Outlaw Josey Wales.

In September 2011, on the 150th anniversary of the Sacking of Osceola, the Osceola Board of Aldermen passed a resolution asking the University of Kansas to no longer to use "Jayhawk" as its mascot and nickname. Further, the resolution asks Missouri residents to stop spelling Kansas or "KU" with a capital letter because "neither is a proper name or a proper place".

The Osceola Public School Building was added to the National Register of Historic Places in 1999.

== Geography ==
According to the United States Census Bureau, the city has a total area of 0.94 square miles (2.43 km^{2}), of which 0.91 square miles (2.36 km^{2}) is land and 0.03 square miles (0.08 km^{2}) is water.

=== Climate ===
Climate data for Osceola, Missouri (1991–2020 normals, extremes 1955–present)
Month	Jan	Feb	Mar	Apr	May	Jun	Jul	Aug	Sep	Oct	Nov	Dec	Year
Record high °F (°C)	76 (24)	83 (28)	90 (32)	97 (36)	97 (36)	104 (40)	110 (43)	110 (43)	107 (42)	96 (36)	85 (29)	76 (24)	110 (43)
Mean daily maximum °F (°C)	42.4 (5.8)	47.3 (8.5)	58.3 (14.6)	67.5 (19.7)	76.9 (24.9)	85.5 (29.7)	90.3 (32.4)	89.3 (31.8)	80.9 (27.2)	69.8 (21.0)	56.5 (13.6)	45.7 (7.6)	67.5 (19.7)
Daily mean °F (°C)	31.7 (−0.2)	35.9 (2.2)	46.4 (8.0)	56.0 (13.3)	65.8 (18.8)	74.8 (23.8)	79.2 (26.2)	77.8 (25.4)	69.2 (20.7)	57.8 (14.3)	45.4 (7.4)	35.4 (1.9)	56.3 (13.5)
Mean daily minimum °F (°C)	21.0 (−6.1)	24.6 (−4.1)	34.5 (1.4)	44.4 (6.9)	54.6 (12.6)	64.0 (17.8)	68.1 (20.1)	66.2 (19.0)	57.5 (14.2)	45.7 (7.6)	34.2 (1.2)	25.0 (−3.9)	45.0 (7.2)
Record low °F (°C)	−19 (−28)	−20 (−29)	−5 (−21)	19 (−7)	23 (−5)	41 (5)	44 (7)	44 (7)	29 (−2)	20 (−7)	0 (−18)	−25 (−32)	−25 (−32)
Average precipitation inches (mm)	1.87 (47)	2.09 (53)	2.80 (71)	4.62 (117)	5.52 (140)	5.12 (130)	4.57 (116)	3.82 (97)	4.02 (102)	3.49 (89)	3.12 (79)	2.20 (56)	43.24 (1,098)
Average snowfall inches (cm)	4.4 (11)	1.5 (3.8)	0.9 (2.3)	0.0 (0.0)	0.0 (0.0)	0.0 (0.0)	0.0 (0.0)	0.0 (0.0)	0.0 (0.0)	0.0 (0.0)	0.2 (0.51)	3.1 (7.9)	10.1 (26)
Average precipitation days (≥ 0.01 in)	4.9	5.1	7.1	8.0	9.3	8.1	7.6	6.1	7.0	7.4	5.9	4.9	81.4
Average snowy days (≥ 0.1 in)	2.1	0.6	0.5	0.0	0.0	0.0	0.0	0.0	0.0	0.0	0.4	0.9	4.5
Source: NOAA

== Demographics ==
Historical population
Census	Pop.	Note	%±
1860	314		—
1870	331		5.4%
1880	373		12.7%
1890	995		166.8%
1900	1,037		4.2%
1910	1,114		7.4%
1920	1,025		−8.0%
1930	1,043		1.8%
1940	1,190		14.1%
1950	1,082		−9.1%
1960	1,066		−1.5%
1970	874		−18.0%
1980	841		−3.8%
1990	755		−10.2%
2000	835		10.6%
2010	947		13.4%
2020	909		−4.0%
U.S. Decennial Census

=== 2010 census ===
As of the census of 2010, there were 947 people, 394 households, and 225 families living in the city. The population density was 1,040.7 inhabitants per square mile (401.8/km^{2}). There were 502 housing units at an average density of 551.6 per square mile (213.0/km^{2}). The racial makeup of the city was 94.2% White, 1.7% African American, 0.7% Native American, 0.1% Asian, 0.4% from other races, and 2.9% from two or more races. Hispanic or Latino of any race were 3.1% of the population.

There were 394 households, of which 31.0% had children under the age of 18 living with them, 35.8% were married couples living together, 16.0% had a female householder with no husband present, 5.3% had a male householder with no wife present, and 42.9% were non-families. 39.6% of all households were made up of individuals, and 22.1% had someone living alone who was 65 years of age or older. The average household size was 2.14 and the average family size was 2.81.

The median age in the city was 39.7 years. 21.9% of residents were under the age of 18; 8.2% were between the ages of 18 and 24; 27% were from 25 to 44; 22.8% were from 45 to 64; and 20.2% were 65 years of age or older. The gender makeup of the city was 50.2% male and 49.8% female.

=== 2000 census ===
As of the census of 2000, there were 835 people, 373 households, and 207 families living in the city. The population density was 896.1 inhabitants per square mile (346.0/km^{2}). There were 472 housing units at an average density of 506.5 per square mile (195.6/km^{2}). The racial makeup of the city was 97.37% White, 0.36% African American, 0.60% Native American, 0.24% Asian, 0.12% Pacific Islander, 0.48% from other races, and 0.84% from two or more races. Hispanic or Latino of any race were 1.08% of the population.

There were 373 households, out of which 26.8% had children under the age of 18 living with them, 40.2% were married couples living together, 12.9% had a female householder with no husband present, and 44.5% were non-families. 39.1% of all households were made up of individuals, and 22.8% had someone living alone who was 65 years of age or older. The average household size was 2.13 and the average family size was 2.86.

In the city, the population was spread out, with 24.6% under the age of 18, 7.1% from 18 to 24, 26.9% from 25 to 44, 20.7% from 45 to 64, and 20.7% who were 65 years of age or older. The median age was 38 years. For every 100 females, there were 95.1 males. For every 100 females age 18 and over, there were 84.8 males.

The median income for a household in the city was $21,563, and the median income for a family was $27,250. Males had a median income of $26,786 versus $15,750 for females. The per capita income for the city was $17,247. About 13.5% of families and 19.1% of the population were below the poverty line, including 18.2% of those under age 18 and 12.9% of those age 65 or over.

== Education ==
Public education in Osceola is administered by Osceola School District.

Osceola has a public library, the Saint Clair County Library.

== Arts and culture ==
The Osceola Chamber of Commerce hosts various activities. The Osceola Rodeo is the biggest event of the year, and Rodeo Daze is held annually on Labor Day weekend. This event includes the street dance, food vendors, and the Rodeo Daze Parade. The annual street dance is held on the Thursday before Labor Day.

== Transportation ==
Intercity bus service to the city is provided by Jefferson Lines.

== In popular culture ==
Osceola is the birthplace of Rooster Cogburn in Charles Portis's 1968 novel True Grit. The pillaging of Osceola by Kansas Jayhawkers and Red Legs is thought to have provided Cogburn's motive for taking part in William Quantrill's infamous sack of Lawrence, Kansas which serves as a biographical background to the story. Osceola is the main theme for Osceola, Missouri, The Burning of 1861, by Richard F. Sunderwirth.

== Notable people ==
- Karolyn Grimes, child actress
- Waldo Johnson, United States Senator
- Warren Love, Missouri representative
- Thomas Marquis, physician and writer
- Tammy Williams, softball player
