= Stanton Township, Linn County, Kansas =

Township in Linn County, Kansas, U.S.

Stanton Township
- Township
- Location in Linn County
- Coordinates: 38.059248°N 94.832791°W
- Country: United States
- State: Kansas
- County: Linn

Area
  - Total: 29.905 sq mi (77.45 km^{2})
  - Land: 29.767 sq mi (77.10 km^{2})
  - Water: 0.138 sq mi (0.36 km^{2}) 0.46%

Population (2020)
  - Total: 148
  - Density: 4.97/sq mi (1.92/km^{2})
- Time zone: UTC-6 (CST)
  - Summer (DST): UTC-5 (CDT)
- Area code: 913

Stanton Township is a township in Linn County, Kansas, United States. As of the 2020 census, its population was 148.

== Geography ==
Stanton Township covers an area of 29.905 square miles (77.45 square kilometers).

=== Communities ===
- Mantey

=== Adjacent townships ===
- Mound City Township, Linn County (north)
- Sheridan Township, Linn County (east)
- Freedom Township, Bourbon County (southeast)
- Timberhill Township, Bourbon County (south)
- Franklin Township, Bourbon County (southwest)
- Blue Mound Township, Linn County (west)

=== Major highways ===
- K-7
- K-31
