= Linnville, Kansas =

Ghost town in Linn County, Kansas, United States

- Ghost town
- The location of Linnville Cemetery
- Coordinates: 38°13′29″N 94°47′50″W
- Country: United States
- State: Kansas
- County: Linn
- Township: Paris
- Elevation: 941 ft (287 m)
- Time zone: UTC–6 (Central)
  - Summer (DST): UTC−5 (CST)
- ZIP Code: 66056
- Area codes: 913

Linnville was the third county seat of Linn County, Kansas, United States. It is located immediately south of the old town site of Paris, the first county seat of Linn County. The only remaining site of the former town is the Linnville Cemetery.

== History ==
Sometime after 1858, the Moneka Academy was moved to Linnville. After the county seat moved from Paris to Mound City in 1859, an indecisive preliminary election to again relocate the county seat was held on May 22, 1865. Then an election to decide the county seat was held on May 30, 1865, in which Linnville received 533 votes to Mound City's 503, and Linnville became the county seat. Another election to decide the county seat was held on February 20, 1866, when Mound City received 635 votes to Linnville's 575. One more election for the county seat involving Linnville was held on May 29, 1866, on the same question, when Mound City received 617 votes, Linnville 301, Mansfield 176, with three votes to others.

Although Linnville is mentioned as never having a post office, one map of Kansas on the Library of Congress website from 1870 mentions a "Linnville Paris P.O." The Linnville Academy building was moved from Linnville to Pleasanton in 1871.
