= K-52 (Kansas highway) =

State highway in Kansas, U.S.

K-52
- K-52 highlighted in red

Route information
- Maintained by KDOT
- Length: 23.045 mi (37.087 km)
- Existed: January 7, 1937–present

Major junctions
- West end: K-31 near Mound City
- K-7 in Mound City; US-69 from Pleasanton to Trading Post
- East end: Route 52 at the Missouri state line in Amoret, MO

Location
- Country: United States
- State: Kansas
- Counties: Linn

Highway system
- Kansas State Highway System; Interstate; US; State; Spurs
← K-51	→ K-53

K-52 is an approximately 23-mile-long (37 km) east–west state highway in eastern Kansas. Its western terminus is at an intersection with K-31 southeast of Mound City. K-52 then overlaps U.S. Route 69 for eight miles (13 km) through Pleasanton and Trading Post, then splits off to the east. three miles (4.8 km) later, it crosses into Missouri, becoming Route 52.

Before state highways were numbered in Kansas there were auto trails. K-192 follows a short section of the former Jefferson Highway in Mound City. The former routing through Pleasanton follows the former Ozark Trails and Kansas City-Fort Scott-Miami-Tulsa Short Line. K-52 was first established as a state highway on January 7, 1937, and went from K-38 in Blue Mound northeastward to K-7 in Mound City. It was extended west then south to US-54 in Moran by the end of 1937. It was realigned to the west of Pleasanton in 1987 and eight years later, the highway was truncated to its current western terminus.

== Route description ==
K-52's western terminus is at K-31 east of Blue Mound. The highway begins travelling east then after about 0.3 miles (0.48 km) curves north at 500th Road. It passes by a cemetery and through a forested area before curving northeast at 600th Road. The highway passes through a forested area for a short distance then transitions to flat rural farmlands. It continues for about 2.1 miles (3.4 km) then enters Mound City and intersects K-7. K-52 turns north and begins to overlap K-7 as 9th Street. After roughly 0.23 miles (0.37 km) K-52 turns east onto Main Street, as K-7 continues north. The highway continues along Main Street for about 0.7 miles (1.1 km) then curves northeast onto North Main Street. After 0.3 miles (0.48 km) it exits the city then curves east. K-52 continues through flat farmlands for about five miles (8.0 km) then reaches an interchange with US-69. K-52 turns north and begins to overlap the four-lane freeway.

K-52 and US-69 cross over a BNSF Railway track then curve north. They then pass under East 1000th Road and then curve northwest. About 0.3 miles (0.48 km) later, the highway reaches an interchange with East 6th Street, which travels west to Pleasanton. The highway continues through flat rural farmlands, as it curves north and crosses Muddy Creek. The freeway continues for 0.5 miles (0.80 km) and then curves northeast before it reaches an interchange with East 1350 Road. It continues northeast and soon crosses Big Sugar Creek, then Marais des Cygnes River 0.9 miles (1.4 km) later. It continues another one mile (1.6 km) and reaches another interchange, where K-52 leaves the freeway. K-52 continues for about 0.6 miles (0.97 km) then curves east. The highway continues through flat rural farmlands for roughly 2.5 miles (4.0 km) then curves southeast and enters into Missouri becoming Missouri Route 52.

The Kansas Department of Transportation (KDOT) tracks the traffic levels on its highways, and in 2019, they determined that on average the traffic varied from 850 vehicles per day near the eastern terminus to between 6,060 and 6,310 vehicles per day along the overlap with US-69. The second highest was 2,570 vehicles per day slightly east of Mound City. The only section of K-52 that is included in the National Highway System is its concurrency with US-69. (Note: The National Highway System is a system of highways important to the nation's defense, economy, and mobility.)

== History ==
Before state highways were numbered in Kansas there were auto trails which were an informal network of marked routes that existed in the United States and Canada in the early part of the 20th century. K-192 follows a short section of the former Jefferson Highway in Mound City. The former routing through Pleasanton follows the former Ozark Trails and Kansas City–Fort Scott–Miami–Tulsa Short Line.

K-52 was first established as a state highway on January 7, 1937, and ran from K-38 in Blue Mound northeastward to K-7 in Mound City. By the end of 1937, K-38 was decommissioned and became an extension of K-31 and K-52 was extended further west to Kincaid then south to end at US-54 in Moran. K-31 originally left K-52 in Blue Mound and went south. Then in an October 9, 1957 resolution, it was realigned further east along K-52, then turned south at K-52's current western terminus. Sometime between 1960 and 1962, US-59 was realigned along K-52 from Moran to Kincaid. Originally K-52 zig-zagged from K-31 northeastward to K-7 in Mound City, but was approved to be straightened in a February 11, 1964 resolution. The new straightened alignment was completed by 1965. On March 30, 1950, a resolution was passed to slightly realign K-52/US-69 near Trading Post. In a May 7, 1987 resolution, K-52/US-69 was realigned from going through Pleasanton to travel to the east of the city. In a January 26, 1995 resolution, K-52 was truncated from Moran to end at K-31, its current western terminus. This was done due to the concurrency having no purpose and was confusing to some travelers. In an April 29, 2008 resolution, K-52 and US-69 was realigned by Pleasanton onto a new four-lane highway. Also a 0.381-mile (0.613 km) extension was built to link the southern end of the old K-52/US-69 overlap to the new one. In another April 29, 2008 resolution, K-52 and US-69 was realigned by Trading Post onto a new four-lane highway. The north end of the K-52 and US-69 overlap was moved slightly north to the new interchange. The two new sections of freeway were completed by 2009.

== Major intersections ==
The entire route is in Linn County. All exits are unnumbered.

Location	mi	km	Destinations	Notes
Mound City Township	0.000	0.000	K-31 – Blue Mound, Garnett, Mapleton	Western terminus; highway continues west as K-31
Mound City	4.392	7.068	K-7 south – Fort Scott	Western end of K-7 overlap
Mound City	4.626	7.445	K-7 north – Osawatomie	Eastern end of K-7 overlap
Potosi Township	10.917	17.569	US-69 south – Fort Scott	Western end of US 69 overlap; diamond interchange; west end of freeway section
Potosi Township	13.617	21.914	E. 1100 Road – Pleasanton	Diamond interchange
Potosi Township	16.180	26.039	E. 1350 Road	Diamond interchange
Valley Township	19.680	31.672	US-69 north – Louisburg	Eastern end of US 69 overlap; diamond interchange; east end of freeway section
Valley Township	23.045	37.087	Route 52 east / State Line Road	Continuation into Missouri
1.000 mi = 1.609 km; 1.000 km = 0.621 mi: Concurrency terminus
