= Moneka, Kansas =

Ghost town in Linn County, Kansas, United States

- Ghost town
- Approximate location of community
- Coordinates: 38°09′42″N 94°50′16″W
- Country: United States
- State: Kansas
- County: Linn
- Township: Paris
- Founded: 1857
- Named for: "Morning Star"

Population
  - Total: 0
- Demonym: Monekan
- Time zone: UTC-6 (CST)
  - Summer (DST): UTC-5 (CDT)
- Area code: 913

Moneka is a ghost town in Linn County, Kansas, United States. The community was said to have been named for a Native American maiden with the name meaning "Morning Star". It was located on Section 1, Township 22 S, Range 23 E, Sixth Principal Meridian. Moneka was a free-state town, established in Kansas Territory during Bleeding Kansas, and most or all of its inhabitants were abolitionists.

== History ==
The community was founded in February 1857. The Moneka Town Company was composed of Augustus Wattles, John O. Wattles, John B. Wood, Andrew Stark, Erastus Heath, and Julius Keeler. With John O. Wattles' influence, Moneka Academy was raised in July 1857, but was not enclosed until March 1858. Sarah A. Wattles, the daughter of Augustus Wattles, began the first term of schooling in April 1858. The hotel was run by George E. Dennison and was popular among the territorial governors, free-state leaders and free-state settlers.

John Brown was first invited to Linn County by Augustus Wattles in the fall of 1858 to assist in fighting the pro-slavery men after the Marais des Cygnes massacre. Brown usually made his headquarters at Wattles' home while in Linn County. On December 30, 1858, John Brown and the Kansas correspondent for The New York Times William Hutchinson arrived at the home of Augustus Wattles in Moneka after Brown's Missouri raid, with eleven people he freed from slavery. Hutchinson later recollected they slept on a bed of hay on the second story of the home. Brown wrote his Parallels while in Moneka at the home of Augustus Wattles when he was writing letters during a discussion with himself, Wattles, John Henry Kagi, and James Montgomery. He had the open letter dated at Trading Post, Kansas, to protect the Wattles household. Augustus Wattles later testified to Congress that after he "severely censured" Brown "for going into Missouri contrary to our agreement and getting these slaves", Brown replied, "I considered the matter well; you will have no more attacks from Missouri; I shall now leave Kansas; you will never see me again; I consider it my duty to draw the scene of the excitement to some other part of the country". Brown thereafter departed the state and landed the freed people safely in Canada.

In 1858 Moneka had a population of about 200 people but the town quickly dwindled away. The Moneka Academy building was moved to Linnville and remained there until 1871, when it was moved to Pleasanton. One of the various projects John O. Wattles was involved in was a railroad from Jefferson City, Missouri, to Emporia, Kansas, by way of Moneka. He held meetings along the route and obtained a charter with directors in both Missouri and Kansas. He also besought Congress to grant the right of way and make an appropriation of public lands. He had the surveys completed and did many other things, among which was the breaking of ground for the proposed railroad at the state line. Congress granted the right of way for the railroad, but the death of Wattles and the outbreak of the Civil War put an end to all proceedings. The town was abandoned about 1864 or 1865.

== Notable people ==
- John Brown – abolitionist, wrote his Parallels in Moneka
- George E. Dennison – member of the Kansas House of Representatives in 1862, elected a Mound City councilman in 1871
- Andrew Stark – first register of deeds of Linn County, member of the Kansas House of Representatives in 1861, first clerk of the Kansas Supreme Court, founder
- Augustus Wattles – abolitionist and editor, founder
- John Otis Wattles – abolitionist, founder
