= Mound City Township, Kansas =

Township in Linn County, Kansas, U.S.

Mound City Township
- Township
- Location in Linn County
- Coordinates: 38.116664°N 94.845529°W
- Country: United States
- State: Kansas
- County: Linn

Area
  - Total: 49.836 sq mi (129.07 km^{2})
  - Land: 49.248 sq mi (127.55 km^{2})
  - Water: 0.588 sq mi (1.52 km^{2}) 1.18%

Population (2020)
  - Total: 1,327
  - Density: 26.95/sq mi (10.40/km^{2})
- Time zone: UTC-6 (CST)
  - Summer (DST): UTC-5 (CDT)
- Area code: 913

Mound City Township is a township in Linn County, Kansas, United States. As of the 2020 census, its population was 1,327.

== Geography ==
Mound City Township covers an area of 49.836 square miles (129.07 square kilometers).

=== Communities ===
- Mound City (county seat)
- Critzer

=== Adjacent townships ===
- Paris Township, Linn County (north)
- Potosi Township, Linn County (northeast)
- Sheridan Township, Linn County (southeast)
- Stanton Township, Linn County (south)
- Blue Mound Township, Linn County (west)
- Centerville Township, Linn County (northwest)

=== Major highways ===
- K-7
- K-31
- K-52
