= Blue Mound =

Blue Mound or Blue Mounds may refer to any of several places in the United States:

- Blue Mound, Illinois
- Blue Mound, Kansas
- Blue Mound (Vernon County, Missouri)
- Blue Mound, Texas
- Blue Mound State Park in Wisconsin
- Blue Mounds Fort in Wisconsin
- Blue Mounds (town), Wisconsin
- Blue Mounds, Wisconsin
- Blue Mounds State Park in Minnesota

See also

- Blue Mound Township (disambiguation)
