= Paris, Linn County, Kansas =

Ghost town in Linn County, Kansas, United States

Paris, Kansas
- Ghost town
- Approximate location of the former town
- Coordinates: 38°13′57″N 94°47′41″W
- Country: United States
- State: Kansas
- County: Linn
- Township: Paris
- Founded: 1856
- Incorporated: 1857
- Named for: Paris, Kentucky

Population
  - Total: 0
- Demonym: Parisian
- Time zone: UTC-6 (CST)
  - Summer (DST): UTC-5 (CDT)
- ZIP Code: 66056
- Area code: 913

Paris was the first county seat of Linn County, Kansas, United States. It had a population of approximately 300 or 400 people before being abandoned in the 1860s. Owned by pro-slavery men, it was a rallying point for those who made raids on free-staters during the Bleeding Kansas period.

== History ==
Paris was named for Paris, Kentucky, the former home of James L. Barlow, one of the community's most prominent citizens. The town's first treasurer was James P. Fox, one of its earliest settlers. In 1856 he used his influence to have his claim selected as the town site for Paris and the county seat. The Paris Town Company was incorporated by a special act approved February 14, 1857, and consisted of James P. Fox, John H. Tate, I. T. Glover, and Luke Grimes. In the summer of 1858 one of the murderers of the Marais des Cygnes massacre, Charles Matlock, was arrested and taken to Paris, where he managed to escape his guard, never to be captured again. The first Republican Convention in Linn County convened at Paris on March 12, 1859.

Paris lost an election to decide the location of the county seat to Mound City on November 8, 1859, in a 471–508 vote. The clerks for the probate court, county court, and district court refused to move county records to Mound City. Eventually John T. Snoddy went to the probate judge, D. W. Cannon, and persuaded him to write an order for Snoddy to bring the records to Mound City. Fifty men were organized to march on Paris and J. H. Trego was sent with a team to obtain a cannon from Osawatomie. About December 1, 1859, the forces of Mound City, led by Charles R. Jennison, set up the cannon before daylight and threatened to destroy the court house and business blocks if the records were not handed over after a set period of time. Just before the expiration of this time, the records were drawn out from someone's bed. The town decayed rapidly after it lost the county government, and in only a few years, hardly a ruin was left to tell where it was. In 1866 or 1867 it was almost entirely abandoned as a town.

== Notable people ==
- Robert Byington Mitchell – settled in Paris in 1857
