= Blue Mound Township, Kansas =

Township in Linn County, Kansas, U.S.

Blue Mound Township
- Township
- Location in Linn County
- Coordinates: 38.095148°N 95.005645°W
- Country: United States
- State: Kansas
- County: Linn

Area
  - Total: 62.861 sq mi (162.81 km^{2})
  - Land: 62.552 sq mi (162.01 km^{2})
  - Water: 0.309 sq mi (0.80 km^{2}) 0.49%

Population (2020)
  - Total: 432
  - Density: 6.91/sq mi (2.67/km^{2})
- Time zone: UTC-6 (CST)
  - Summer (DST): UTC-5 (CDT)
- Area code: 913

Blue Mound Township is a township in Linn County, Kansas, United States. As of the 2020 census, its population was 432.

== Geography ==
Blue Mound Township covers an area of 62.861 square miles (162.81 square kilometers).

=== Communities ===
- Blue Mound

=== Adjacent townships ===
- Centerville Township, Linn County (north)
- Mound City Township, Linn County (northeast)
- Stanton Township, Linn County (east)
- Timberhill Township, Bourbon County (southeast)
- Franklin Township, Bourbon County (south)
- Osage Township, Allen County (southwest)
- Rich Township, Anderson County (west)

=== Major highways ===
- K-3
- K-31
