= Keokuk, Kansas =

Ghost town in Linn County, Kansas, United States

- Ghost town
- Approximate location of Keokuk
- Coordinates: 38°15′29″N 94°57′13″W
- Country: United States
- State: Kansas
- County: Linn
- Township: Liberty
- Time zone: UTC–6 (Central)
  - Summer (DST): UTC−5 (CST)
- ZIP Code: 66014
- Area codes: 913

Keokuk is a ghost town in Linn County, Kansas, United States. It was established in the 1850s, in Kansas Territory, and disappeared from maps by the 1870s. It was northwest of the original location of Centerville and was located twelve miles northwest of Sugar Mound.

== History ==
Keokuk served as the voting place for the Big Sugar precinct in the March 30, 1855, election for the Territorial legislature. Seventeen votes were for the Free-State candidates and there were seventy-four votes for the pro-slavery candidates. Of these votes, thirty-two were found to be legal and fifty-nine were found to be illegal.
