= Osawatomie Township, Kansas =

Township in Miami County, Kansas, U.S.

Osawatomie Township
- Township
- Location within Miami County
- Coordinates: 38.480727°N 94.995344°W
- Country: United States
- State: Kansas
- County: Miami

Area
  - Total: 34.401 sq mi (89.10 km^{2})
  - Land: 33.899 sq mi (87.80 km^{2})
  - Water: 0.502 sq mi (1.30 km^{2}) 1.46%

Population (2020)
  - Total: 694
  - Density: 20.5/sq mi (7.90/km^{2})
- Time zone: UTC-6 (CST)
  - Summer (DST): UTC-5 (CDT)
- Area code: 913

Osawatomie Township is a township in Miami County, Kansas, United States. As of the 2020 census, its population was 694.

== Geography ==
Osawatomie Township covers an area of 34.401 square miles (89.10 square kilometers). The Marais des Cygnes River flows through it.

=== Adjacent townships ===
- Stanton Township, Miami County (north)
- Valley Township, Miami County (northeast)
- Osage Township, Miami County (east)
- Mound Township, Miami County (south)
- Pottawatomie Township, Franklin County (southwest)
- Cutler Township, Franklin County (northwest)

=== Major highways ===
- US-169
- K-7
