= Mound Township, Miami County, Kansas =

Township in Miami County, Kansas, U.S.

Mound Township
- Township
- Location within Miami County
- Coordinates: 38.428755°N 95.000302°W
- Country: United States
- State: Kansas
- County: Miami

Area
  - Total: 32.174 sq mi (83.33 km^{2})
  - Land: 31.993 sq mi (82.86 km^{2})
  - Water: 0.181 sq mi (0.47 km^{2}) 0.56%

Population (2020)
  - Total: 700
  - Density: 22/sq mi (8.4/km^{2})
- Time zone: UTC-6 (CST)
  - Summer (DST): UTC-5 (CDT)
- Area code: 913

Mound Township is a township in Miami County, Kansas, United States. As of the 2020 census, its population was 700.

== Geography ==
Mound Township covers an area of 32.174 square miles (83.33 square kilometers).

=== Communities ===
- Beagle

=== Adjacent townships ===
- Osawatomie Township, Miami County (north)
- Osage Township, Miami County (east)
- Scott Township, Linn County (southeast)
- Liberty Township, Linn County (south)
- Walker Township, Anderson County (southwest)
- Pottawatomie Township, Franklin County (west)

=== Major highways ===
- US-169
- K-7
