= Centerville Township =

Centerville Township may refer to:

- Centerville Township, in Yell County, Arkansas
- Centerville Township, Linn County, Kansas, in Linn County, Kansas
- Centerville Township, Neosho County, Kansas, in Neosho County, Kansas
- Centerville Township, Michigan
- Centerville Township, Faulk County, South Dakota, in Faulk County, South Dakota
- Centerville Township, Turner County, South Dakota, in Turner County, South Dakota
