= Richland Township, Miami County, Kansas =

Township in Miami County, Kansas, U.S.

Richland Township
- Township
- Location within Miami County
- Coordinates: 38.672352°N 94.987069°W
- Country: United States
- State: Kansas
- County: Miami

Area
  - Total: 70.305 sq mi (182.09 km^{2})
  - Land: 66.051 sq mi (171.07 km^{2})
  - Water: 4.254 sq mi (11.02 km^{2}) 6.05%

Population (2020)
  - Total: 2,025
  - Density: 30.66/sq mi (11.84/km^{2})
- Time zone: UTC-6 (CST)
  - Summer (DST): UTC-5 (CDT)
- Area code: 913

Richland Township is a township in Miami County, Kansas, United States. As of the 2020 census, its population was 2,025.

== Geography ==
Richland Township covers an area of 70.305 square miles (182.09 square kilometers). The township includes most of Hillsdale Lake and Hillsdale State Park.

=== Adjacent townships ===
- McCamish Township, Johnson County (north)
- Gardner Township, Johnson County (northeast)
- Marysville Township, Miami County (east)
- Paola Township, Miami County (southeast)
- Stanton Township, Miami County (south)
- Peoria Township, Franklin County (southwest)
- Franklin Township, Franklin County (west)
- Palmyra Township, Douglas County (northwest)

=== Major highways ===
- I-35
- US-50
- K-68
