= West Boone Township, Bates County, Missouri =

Township in the US state of Missouri

West Boone Township
- Township
- Location in Bates County
- Coordinates: 38°23′55″N 94°32′28″W
- Country: United States
- State: Missouri
- County: Bates

Area
  - Total: 30.24 sq mi (78.33 km^{2})
  - Land: 30.06 sq mi (77.86 km^{2})
  - Water: 0.18 sq mi (0.47 km^{2}) 0.6%
- Elevation: 892 ft (272 m)

Population (2000)
  - Total: 582
  - Density: 19/sq mi (7.5/km^{2})
- Time zone: UTC-6 (CST)
  - Summer (DST): UTC-5 (CDT)
- ZIP codes: 64723, 64742
- GNIS feature ID: 0766311

West Boone Township is one of twenty-four townships in Bates County, Missouri, and is part of the Kansas City metropolitan area within the USA. As of the 2000 census, its population was 582.

West Boone Township derives its name from the pioneer Daniel Boone.

== Geography ==
According to the United States Census Bureau, West Boone Township covers an area of 30.24 square miles (78.33 square kilometers); of this, 30.06 square miles (77.86 square kilometers, 99.4 percent) is land and 0.18 square miles (0.47 square kilometers, 0.6 percent) is water.

=== Cities, towns, villages ===
- Drexel (south edge)
- Merwin

=== Unincorporated towns ===
- South Drexel at 38.476404°N 94.608844°W

(This list is based on USGS data and may include former settlements.)

=== Adjacent townships ===
- Coldwater Township, Cass County (north)
- Everett Township, Cass County (northeast)
- East Boone Township (east)
- Elkhart Township (southeast)
- West Point Township (south)
- Sugar Creek Township, Miami County, Kansas (west)

=== Cemeteries ===
The township contains Edgewood Cemetery.

=== Airports and landing strips ===
- Arvin Ranch Airport

== School districts ==
- Drexel R-IV
- Miami R-I

== Political districts ==
- Missouri's 4th congressional district
- State House District 120
- State House District 125
- State Senate District 31
