= Sugar Creek Township, Kansas =

Township in Miami County, Kansas, U.S.

Sugar Creek Township
- Township
- Location within Miami County
- Coordinates: 38.454069°N 94.649516°W
- Country: United States
- State: Kansas
- County: Miami

Area
  - Total: 40.274 sq mi (104.31 km^{2})
  - Land: 39.3 sq mi (102 km^{2})
  - Water: 0.974 sq mi (2.52 km^{2}) 2.42%

Population (2020)
  - Total: 495
  - Density: 12.6/sq mi (4.86/km^{2})
- Time zone: UTC-6 (CST)
  - Summer (DST): UTC-5 (CDT)
- Area code: 913

Sugar Creek Township is a township in Miami County, Kansas, United States. As of the 2020 census, its population was 495.

== Geography ==
Sugar Creek Township covers an area of 40.274 square miles (104.31 square kilometers).

=== Adjacent townships ===
- Middle Creek Township, Miami County (north)
- Coldwater Township, Cass County, Missouri (northeast)
- West Boone Township, Bates County, Missouri (east)
- West Point Township, Bates County, Missouri (southeast)
- Lincoln Township, Linn County (south)
- Miami Township, Miami County (west)

=== Major highways ===
- US-69
