= K239 =

K239 or K-239 may refer to:

- K239 Chunmoo, South Korean rocket artillery system
- K-239 (Kansas highway), state highway in Kansas
- Russian submarine Carp (B-239), Russian submarine
- K.239: Serenade No. 6 (Mozart) for orchestra in D major, "Serenata Notturna" (1776)
