= Sheridan Township, Linn County, Kansas =

Township in Linn County, Kansas, U.S.

Sheridan Township
- Township
- Location in Linn County
- Coordinates: 38.08255°N 94.680154°W
- Country: United States
- State: Kansas
- County: Linn

Area
  - Total: 44.738 sq mi (115.87 km^{2})
  - Land: 44.071 sq mi (114.14 km^{2})
  - Water: 0.667 sq mi (1.73 km^{2}) 1.49%

Population (2020)
  - Total: 450
  - Density: 10/sq mi (3.9/km^{2})
- Time zone: UTC-6 (CST)
  - Summer (DST): UTC-5 (CDT)
- Area code: 913

Sheridan Township is a township in Linn County, Kansas, United States. As of the 2020 census, its population was 450.

== Geography ==
Sheridan Township covers an area of 44.738 square miles (115.87 square kilometers).

=== Communities ===
- Prescott

=== Adjacent townships ===
- Potosi Township, Linn County (north)
- Walnut Township, Bates County, Missouri (northeast)
- Howard Township, Bates County, Missouri (east)
- Henry Township, Vernon County, Missouri (southeast)
- Osage Township, Bourbon County (south)
- Freedom Township, Bourbon County (southwest)
- Stanton Township, Linn County (west)
- Mound City Township, Linn County (northwest)

=== Major highways ===
- US-69
- K-239
