= Keokuk =

Keokuk may refer to:

- Keokuk (Sauk chief)

Entities named after Chief Keokuk:

Places:

- Keokuk, Iowa, U.S.
- Keokuk Airport, Iowa, U.S.
- Keokuk County, Iowa, U.S.
- Keokuk, Kansas, U.S.
- Keokuk–Hamilton Bridge, U.S.
- Keokuk Rail Bridge, U.S.
- Keokuk Avenue, a street in Chatsworth, California, U.S.

Things:

- Keokuk Westerns, a professional baseball team in the National Association in 1875
- USS Keokuk, several U.S. Navy ships
