= Valley Township, Linn County, Kansas =

Township in Linn County, Kansas, U.S.

Valley Township
- Township
- Location in Linn County
- Coordinates: 38.262463°N 94.691311°W
- Country: United States
- State: Kansas
- County: Linn

Area
  - Total: 38.823 sq mi (100.55 km^{2})
  - Land: 36.946 sq mi (95.69 km^{2})
  - Water: 1.877 sq mi (4.86 km^{2}) 4.83%

Population (2020)
  - Total: 130
  - Density: 3.5/sq mi (1.4/km^{2})
- Time zone: UTC-6 (CST)
  - Summer (DST): UTC-5 (CDT)
- Area code: 913

Valley Township is a township in Linn County, Kansas, United States. As of the 2020 census, its population was 130.

== Geography ==
Valley Township covers an area of 38.823 square miles (100.55 square kilometers).

=== Communities ===
- Trading Post

=== Adjacent townships ===
- Lincoln Township, Linn County (north)
- Homer Township, Bates County, Missouri (east)
- Walnut Township, Bates County, Missouri (southeast)
- Potosi Township, Linn County (south)
- Paris Township, Linn County (southwest)
- Scott Township, Linn County (northwest)

=== Major highways ===
- US-69
- K-52
