= Stanton Township, Miami County, Kansas =

Township in Miami County, Kansas, U.S.

Stanton Township
- Township
- Location within Miami County
- Coordinates: 38.569413°N 94.999411°W
- Country: United States
- State: Kansas
- County: Miami

Area
  - Total: 40.155 sq mi (104.00 km^{2})
  - Land: 39.772 sq mi (103.01 km^{2})
  - Water: 0.383 sq mi (0.99 km^{2}) 0.95%

Population (2020)
  - Total: 856
  - Density: 21.5/sq mi (8.31/km^{2})
- Time zone: UTC-6 (CST)
  - Summer (DST): UTC-5 (CDT)
- Area code: 913

Stanton Township is a township in Miami County, Kansas, United States. As of the 2020 census, its population was 856.

== Geography ==
Stanton Township covers an area of 40.155 square miles (104.00 square kilometers). The Marais des Cygnes River flows through it.

=== Communities ===
- Stanton

=== Adjacent townships ===
- Richland Township, Miami County (north)
- Paola Township, Miami County (east)
- Valley Township, Miami County (southeast)
- Osawatomie Township, Miami County (south)
- Cutler Township, Franklin County (southwest)
- Peoria Township, Franklin County (northwest)
