= Blue Mound Township, Illinois =

Blue Mound Township, Illinois refers to one of the following places:

- Blue Mound Township, Macon County, Illinois
- Blue Mound Township, McLean County, Illinois

See also

- Blue Mound Township (disambiguation)
