= Middle Creek Township, Kansas =

Township in Miami County, Kansas, U.S.

Middle Creek Township
- Township
- Location within Miami County
- Coordinates: 38.570624°N 94.708788°W
- Country: United States
- State: Kansas
- County: Miami

Area
  - Total: 58.853 sq mi (152.43 km^{2})
  - Land: 58.268 sq mi (150.91 km^{2})
  - Water: 0.585 sq mi (1.52 km^{2}) 0.99%

Population (2020)
  - Total: 1,814
  - Density: 31.13/sq mi (12.02/km^{2})
- Time zone: UTC-6 (CST)
  - Summer (DST): UTC-5 (CDT)
- Area code: 913

Middle Creek Township is a township in Miami County, Kansas, United States. As of the 2020 census, its population was 1,814.

== Geography ==
Middle Creek Township covers an area of 58.853 square miles (152.43 square kilometers).

=== Communities ===
- part of Somerset

=== Adjacent townships ===
- Ten Mile Township, Miami County (north-northwest)
- Wea Township, Miami County (north)
- West Dolan Township, Cass County, Missouri (northeast)
- Coldwater Township, Cass County, Missouri (southeast)
- Sugar Creek Township, Miami County (south)
- Miami Township, Miami County (south-southwest)
- Valley Township, Miami County (southwest)
- Paola Township, Miami County (west)
- Marysville Township, Miami County (northwest)

=== Major highways ===
- US-69
