= Hail Ridge, Kansas =

Coordinates: 38.110°N 94.915°W

Hail Ridge is a ghost town in Linn County, Kansas, United States, located nine miles (14 km) southwest of Mound City and five miles (8.0 km) east of Blue Mound.

== History ==
There existed a one room school house (N0. 29) in Hail Ridge. It operated from 1875 to 1957. School sections of the time were planned to cover 6 square miles (16 km^{2}) with a one-room school building in the middle of the section. The one room school building called Hail Ridge was located at the current intersection of Ingram and 600 Road. Three miles in each direction of the building would encompass the territory south of 900 Road and north of 300 Road and west of Lewis Road and east of Farris Road.

Hester Elliot was one of the school's teachers. George Ferguson was the last teacher when it closed in 1957. Grades 1-8 were taught and most children rode horses or walked to the school.

Formerly (1879 – 1888) Hail Ridge had a US post office that possibly was located where the Weatherby family had a general store located at the midpoint of the southern border of section 30 in the Mound City Township.

Family names of those who lived in the area during the early to late 1900s were Paddock, Stites, Stockhoff, Strawbridge, Robinson, Sisson, Priest, Morrell, Weatherby, Davis, Johnson, and Rogers.
