= Critzer, Kansas =

- Unincorporated community
- Location within Kansas Location within the United States
- Coordinates: 38°08′24″N 94°54′46″W
- Country: United States
- State: Kansas
- County: Linn
- Elevation: 886 ft (270 m)
- Time zone: UTC-6 (CST)
  - Summer (DST): UTC-5 (CDT)
- Area code: 913
- FIPS code: 20-16410
- GNIS ID: 484831

Critzer is an unincorporated community in Linn County, Kansas, United States.

== History ==
Critzer US Post Office was established on January 1, 1890, and remained open until September 15, 1906. Critzer is named after an engineer who worked for the Missouri Pacific Railroad. He later moved to the state of Washington.

== Geography ==
Critzer is located 6 miles (9.7 km) west of the county seat, Mound City. Critzer lies 883 feet (269 m) above sea level.

== Education ==
A one-room school operated in Critzer from 1875 to 1941.
