= Paola Township, Kansas =

Township in Miami County, Kansas, U.S.

Paola Township
- Township
- Location within Miami County
- Coordinates: 38.590123°N 94.906541°W
- Country: United States
- State: Kansas
- County: Miami

Area
  - Total: 26.281 sq mi (68.07 km^{2})
  - Land: 25.912 sq mi (67.11 km^{2})
  - Water: 0.369 sq mi (0.96 km^{2}) 1.40%

Population (2020)
  - Total: 1,067
  - Density: 41.18/sq mi (15.90/km^{2})
- Time zone: UTC-6 (CST)
  - Summer (DST): UTC-5 (CDT)
- Area code: 913

Paola Township is a township in Miami County, Kansas, United States. As of the 2020 census, its population was 1,067.

== Geography ==
Paola Township covers an area of 26.281 square miles (68.07 square kilometers).

=== Adjacent townships ===
- Marysville Township, Miami County (north)
- Ten Mile Township, Miami County (northeast)
- Middle Creek Township, Miami County (east)
- Valley Township, Miami County (south)
- Stanton Township, Miami County (west)
- Richland Township, Miami County (northwest)

=== Major highways ===
- US-169
- K-7
