= Lincoln Township, Linn County, Kansas =

Township in Linn County, Kansas, U.S.

Lincoln Township
- Township
- Location in Linn County
- Coordinates: 38.340687°N 94.688777°W
- Country: United States
- State: Kansas
- County: Linn

Area
  - Total: 52.383 sq mi (135.67 km^{2})
  - Land: 47.379 sq mi (122.71 km^{2})
  - Water: 5.004 sq mi (12.96 km^{2}) 9.55%

Population (2020)
  - Total: 2,525
  - Density: 53.29/sq mi (20.58/km^{2})
- Time zone: UTC-6 (CST)
  - Summer (DST): UTC-5 (CDT)
- Area code: 913

Lincoln Township is a township in Linn County, Kansas, United States. As of the 2020 census, its population was 2,525.

== Geography ==
Lincoln Township covers an area of 52.383 square miles (135.67 square kilometers). Most of La Cygne Lake is located within the township.

=== Communities ===
- part of La Cygne
- Linn Valley

=== Adjacent townships ===
- Miami Township, Miami County (northwest)
- Sugar Creek Township, Miami County (northeast)
- West Point Township, Bates County, Missouri (east)
- Homer Township, Bates County, Missouri (southeast)
- Valley Township, Linn County (south)
- Scott Township, Linn County (west)

=== Major highways ===
- US-69
- K-152
