= Valley Township, Miami County, Kansas =

Township in Miami County, Kansas, U.S.

Valley Township
- Township
- Location within Miami County
- Coordinates: 38.523795°N 94.85456°W
- Country: United States
- State: Kansas
- County: Miami

Area
  - Total: 35.28 sq mi (91.4 km^{2})
  - Land: 34.846 sq mi (90.25 km^{2})
  - Water: 0.434 sq mi (1.12 km^{2}) 1.23%

Population (2020)
  - Total: 1,306
  - Density: 37.48/sq mi (14.47/km^{2})
- Time zone: UTC-6 (CST)
  - Summer (DST): UTC-5 (CDT)
- Area code: 913

Valley Township is a township in Miami County, Kansas, United States. As of the 2020 census, its population was 1,306.

== Geography ==
Valley Township covers an area of 35.28 square miles (91.4 square kilometers). The Marais des Cygnes River flows through it.

=== Communities ===
- Block

=== Adjacent townships ===
- Paola Township, Miami County (north)
- Middle Creek Township, Miami County (northeast)
- Miami Township, Miami County (southeast)
- Osage Township, Miami County (south)
- Osawatomie Township, Miami County (southwest)
- Stanton Township, Miami County (northwest)

=== Major highways ===
- US-169
- K-7
