= Blue Mound Township =

Blue Mound Township may refer to:

- Blue Mound Township, McLean County, Illinois
- Blue Mound Township, Macon County, Illinois
- Blue Mound Township, Linn County, Kansas, in Linn County, Kansas
- Blue Mound Township, Livingston County, Missouri
- Blue Mound Township, Vernon County, Missouri

== See also ==
- Blue Mounds Township, Pope County, Minnesota
