= Area code 785 =

Area code in northern Kansas, United States

Coordinates: 39.500°N 98.500°W

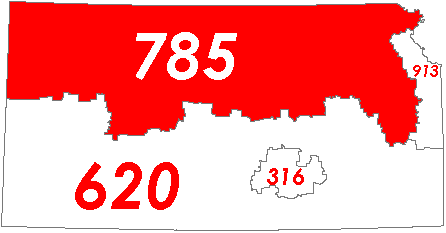
Map of Kansas with area code 785 in Red

Area code 785 is a telephone area code in the North American Numbering Plan for most of the northern part of the U.S. state Kansas. It was created in a split of the numbering plan area 913 on July 20, 1997. The numbering plan area stretches from the Colorado state line on the west to the Missouri state line on the east, while excluding the Kansas side of the Kansas City metropolitan area, which retained 913. The largest city by population is Topeka, the state capital city.

== History ==
When the area code system was created in 1947, the southern half of the state (Dodge City, Emporia, Garden City, Wichita) was designated as numbering plan area 316, while the northern half (Kansas City, Topeka, Lawrence, Goodland, Manhattan, Salina, Hays) received area code 913.

This configuration remained in place for 40 years. However, by the mid-1990s, 913 was close to exhaustion due to the rapid growth of the Kansas City area, as well as the proliferation of cell phones and pagers. The latter was especially pronounced in the eastern part of the 913 territory (the Kansas City suburbs, Topeka, and Lawrence), home to the bulk of the numbering plan's available numbers.

Late in 1996, the Kansas Corporation Commission, which oversees telecommunications in the state, requested relief from the North American Numbering Plan Administration (NANPA) for the exchanges of area code 913. On February 12, 1997, the NANPA announced that 913 would be cut back to the Kansas side of the Kansas City area, while most of the western portion of the old 913 plan area–everything from Lawrence westward–was split off as area code 785, effective on July 20, 1997. Permissive dialing of 913 continued across northern Kansas until October 3, 1998.

The bulk of 785's landlines and cell phones are in the eastern portion, in and around Topeka and Lawrence. Despite this, 785 will not be near exhaustion until the end of the decade. Under the 2023 NANPA projections, northern Kansas will not need another area code until 2029.

Prior to October 2021, area code 785 had telephone numbers assigned for the central office code 988. In 2020, 988 was designated nationwide as a dialing code for the National Suicide Prevention Lifeline, which created a conflict for exchanges that permit seven-digit dialing. This area code was therefore scheduled to transition to ten-digit dialing by October 24, 2021.

== Service area ==
=== Major cities ===
The principal cities in numbering plan area 785 are Colby, Goodland, Hays, Junction City, Lawrence, Manhattan, Ottawa, Salina, and Topeka.

=== Boundaries ===
The boundary between 785 and area code 620, which covers southern Kansas outside of the Wichita metropolitan area, runs from west to east roughly following a path along K-4 and K-96. The code boundary dips along I-135 in McPherson County and continues east to just north of Emporia in Lyon County along the Kansas Turnpike. At this point, area code 785 reaches its easternmost boundary with the current boundary for area code 913, although a small portion of the northeast corner of Kansas across the Missouri River from St. Joseph, Missouri is part of 785.

The numbering plan area contains the entire counties of Anderson, Cheyenne, Franklin, Rawlins, Decatur, Norton, Phillips, Smith, Jewell, Republic, Washington, Nemaha, Marshall, Brown, Sherman, Thomas, Sheridan, Graham, Rooks, Osborne, Mitchell, Lincoln, Cloud, Ottawa, Clay, Riley, Pottawatomie, Jackson, Wallace, Logan, Gove, Trego, Ness, Rush, Ellis, Russell, Ellsworth, Saline, Dickinson, Geary, Wabaunsee, Shawnee, Osage, and Douglas, as well as portions of Doniphan, Atchison, Coffey, Lyon, Jefferson, Morris and McPherson counties.

The counties of Linn, Miami, Johnson, Wyandotte, and Leavenworth belong to number plan area 913.

One exception to this rule is the city of Elwood, which retained the 913 area code while the rest of Doniphan County switched to 785. This is because Elwood's servicing wire center is in St. Joseph, Missouri, which is part of the Kansas City, Missouri LATA, located in area code 816. It would have been too expensive for Southwestern Bell to reroute Elwood's trunk lines so it could follow the rest of Doniphan County into 785. All bordering 816/913 rate centers have each other's area codes.

== Popular culture ==
Area code 785 features in the diner scene of the 2009 comedy Black Dynamite, and in episode no. 4 of the first season of the dark fantasy Supernatural.

== See also ==
- List of Kansas area codes
- List of North American Numbering Plan area codes

Kansas area codes: 316, 620, 785, 913
	North: 308, 402/531	
West: 719, 970	785	East: 660, 816/975, 913
	South: 620	
Colorado area codes: 303/720/983, 719, 748/970
Missouri area codes: 314/557, 417, 573/235, 636, 660, 816/975
Nebraska area codes: 308, 402/531
