= Ten Mile Township, Kansas =

Township in Miami County, Kansas, U.S.

Ten Mile Township
- Township
- Location within Miami County
- Coordinates: 38.675653°N 94.748781°W
- Country: United States
- State: Kansas
- County: Miami

Area
  - Total: 47.095 sq mi (121.98 km^{2})
  - Land: 46.655 sq mi (120.84 km^{2})
  - Water: 0.44 sq mi (1.1 km^{2}) 0.93%

Population (2020)
  - Total: 1,543
  - Density: 33.07/sq mi (12.77/km^{2})
- Time zone: UTC-6 (CST)
  - Summer (DST): UTC-5 (CDT)
- Area code: 913

Ten Mile Township is a township in Miami County, Kansas, United States. As of the 2020 census, its population was 1,543.

== Geography ==
Ten Mile Township covers an area of 47.095 square miles (121.98 square kilometers).

=== Communities ===
- Bucyrus
- part of Somerset

=== Adjacent townships ===
- Aubry Township, Johnson County (northeast)
- Wea Township, Miami County (east)
- Middle Creek Township, Miami County (south)
- Paola Township, Miami County (southwest)
- Marysville Township, Miami County (west)
- Spring Hill Township, Johnson County (northwest)

=== Major highways ===
- K-68
