= Liberty Township, Linn County, Kansas =

Township in Linn County, Kansas, U.S.

Liberty Township
- Township
- Location in Linn County
- Coordinates: 38.332156°N 94.990942°W
- Country: United States
- State: Kansas
- County: Linn

Area
  - Total: 64.337 sq mi (166.63 km^{2})
  - Land: 63.982 sq mi (165.71 km^{2})
  - Water: 0.355 sq mi (0.92 km^{2}) 0.55%

Population (2020)
  - Total: 921
  - Density: 14.4/sq mi (5.56/km^{2})
- Time zone: UTC-6 (CST)
  - Summer (DST): UTC-5 (CDT)
- Area code: 913

Liberty Township is a township in Linn County, Kansas, United States. As of the 2020 census, its population was 921.

== Geography ==
Liberty Township covers an area of 64.337 square miles (166.63 square kilometers).

=== Communities ===
- Parker

=== Adjacent townships ===
- Mound Township, Miami County (north)
- Osage Township, Miami County (northeast)
- Scott Township, Linn County (east)
- Centerville Township, Linn County (south)
- Walker Township, Anderson County (west)
- Pottawatomie Township, Franklin County (northwest)
