= Centerville Township, Linn County, Kansas =

Township in Linn County, Kansas, U.S.

Centerville Township
- Township
- Location in Linn County
- Coordinates: 38.215002°N 94.98524°W
- Country: United States
- State: Kansas
- County: Linn

Area
  - Total: 79.515 sq mi (205.94 km^{2})
  - Land: 79.053 sq mi (204.75 km^{2})
  - Water: 0.462 sq mi (1.20 km^{2}) 0.58%

Population (2020)
  - Total: 483
  - Density: 6.11/sq mi (2.36/km^{2})
- Time zone: UTC-6 (CST)
  - Summer (DST): UTC-5 (CDT)
- Area code: 913

Centerville Township is a township in Linn County, Kansas, United States. As of the 2020 census, its population was 483.

== Geography ==
Centerville Township covers an area of 79.515 square miles (205.94 square kilometers).

=== Communities ===
- Centerville

=== Adjacent townships ===
- Liberty Township, Linn County (north)
- Scott Township, Linn County (northeast)
- Paris Township, Linn County (east)
- Mound City Township, Linn County (southeast)
- Blue Mound Township, Linn County (south)
- Rich Township, Anderson County (southwest)
- Lincoln Township, Anderson County (west)
- Walker Township, Anderson County (northwest)
