= K-239 (Kansas highway) =

State highway in Kansas, U.S.

K-239
- K-239 highlighted in red

Route information
- Maintained by KDOT
- Length: 5.677 mi (9.136 km)
- Existed: July 11, 1962–present

Major junctions
- West end: US-69 west of Prescott
- East end: Route A at the Missouri state line in Hume, MO

Location
- Country: United States
- State: Kansas
- Counties: Linn

Highway system
- Kansas State Highway System; Interstate; US; State; Spurs
← K-238	→ K-241

K-239 is a 5.677-mile-long (9.136 km) east–west state highway in the U.S. state of Kansas. K-239's western terminus is at a diamond interchange with U.S. Route 69 (US-69) west of the City of Prescott. The eastern terminus is at the Missouri state line, where it continues as Missouri Route A. K-239 is a two-lane highway for its entire length.

Before highways were numbered in Kansas there were auto trails. K-239 crosses the former Kansas City-Fort Scott-Miami-Tulsa Short Line and former Ozark Trails in Prescott. K-239 was first designated as a state highway by the State Highway Commission of Kansas, now known as the Kansas Department of Transportation, on July 11, 1962. At that time, the highway was a spur connecting Prescott with US-69, which previously travelled north–south through the city. In 1964, the highway was approved to be extended east to the Missouri state line.

== Route description ==
K-239's western terminus is at a diamond interchange with US-69 west of Prescott. The highway travels east and soon enters Prescott as Miller Street. The roadway has an at-grade crossing with two BNSF Railway tracks before exiting the city. K-239 continues east to a crossing over Indian Creek. The highway proceeds east past some strip mines before reaching the Missouri border, where it curves north. The roadway continues along the border for a short distance before curving east and crossing into Missouri becoming Missouri Route A.

The entire length of K-239 is a two-lane highway. The Kansas Department of Transportation (KDOT) tracks the traffic levels on its highways. On K-239 in 2020, they determined that on average the traffic varied from 400 vehicles per day near the Missouri border to 1,460 vehicles per day near the western terminus. The second highest was 705 vehicles per day slightly east of Prescott. K-239 connects to the National Highway System at its western terminus at US-69.

== History ==
Before state highways were numbered in Kansas there were auto trails. K-239 crosses the former Kansas City-Fort Scott-Miami-Tulsa Short Line and former Ozark Trails in Prescott.

Originally US-69 travelled directly north–south through Prescott. Then in a resolution passed by the State Highway Commission of Kansas (SHC), now known as KDOT, on July 11, 1962, it was approved to move US-69 onto a new alignment west of the city. At this time K-239 was approved to be created as a spur connecting Prescott to the new US-69. On June 28, 1963, the SHC accepted a bid of $493,783.02 (equivalent to $3.87 million in 2024 dollars) to pave the new section of US-69 and a bid of $61,851.08 (equivalent to $484,159 in 2024 dollars) to pave the new K-239.

In mid-December 1963, the SHC authorized the acquisition of land to extend K-239 eastward. Then in a resolution passed on January 8, 1964, the plans were approved for the extension eastward to the Missouri State line to connect to Missouri Route A. In July 1964, the SHC asked for bids for grading, bridges and surfacing on the extension of K-239. On August 31, 1965, the SHC approved a bid of $146,969 (equivalent to $1.11 million in 2024 dollars) to pave the new highway. By 1987, the western terminus was converted to a diamond interchange. The highways alignment has not changed since the interchange was built.

== Major intersections ==
The entire route is in Sheridan Township, Linn County.

mi	km	Destinations	Notes
0.000	0.000	US-69 – Fort Scott, Kansas City	Western terminus; diamond interchange
5.677	9.136	Route A	Continuation at Missouri state line
1.000 mi = 1.609 km; 1.000 km = 0.621 mi
