= Miami Township, Miami County, Kansas =

Township in Miami County, Kansas, U.S.

Miami Township
- Township
- Location within Miami County
- Coordinates: 38.45525°N 94.742873°W
- Country: United States
- State: Kansas
- County: Miami

Area
  - Total: 48.645 sq mi (125.99 km^{2})
  - Land: 48.026 sq mi (124.39 km^{2})
  - Water: 0.619 sq mi (1.60 km^{2}) 1.27%

Population (2020)
  - Total: 545
  - Density: 11.3/sq mi (4.38/km^{2})
- Time zone: UTC-6 (CST)
  - Summer (DST): UTC-5 (CDT)
- Area code: 913

Miami Township is a township in Miami County, Kansas, United States. As of the 2020 census, its population was 545.

== Geography ==
Miami Township covers an area of 48.645 square miles (125.99 square kilometers). The Marais des Cygnes River flows through it.

=== Adjacent townships ===
- Middle Creek Township, Miami County (north)
- Sugar Creek Township, Miami County (east)
- Lincoln Township, Linn County (south)
- Scott Township, Linn County (southwest)
- Osage Township, Miami County (west)
- Valley Township, Miami County (northwest)
