= Marysville Township, Miami County, Kansas =

Township in Miami County, Kansas, U.S.

Marysville Township
- Township
- Location within Miami County
- Coordinates: 38.668952°N 94.859351°W
- Country: United States
- State: Kansas
- County: Miami

Area
  - Total: 53.862 sq mi (139.50 km^{2})
  - Land: 49.765 sq mi (128.89 km^{2})
  - Water: 4.097 sq mi (10.61 km^{2}) 7.61%

Population (2020)
  - Total: 2,452
  - Density: 49.27/sq mi (19.02/km^{2})
- Time zone: UTC-6 (CST)
  - Summer (DST): UTC-5 (CDT)
- Area code: 913

Marysville Township is a township in Miami County, Kansas, United States. As of the 2020 census, its population was 2,452.

== Geography ==
Marysville Township covers an area of 53.862 square miles (139.50 square kilometers). Part of Hillsdale Lake and Hillsdale State Park is located within the township.

=== Communities ===
- Hillsdale

=== Adjacent townships ===
- Gardner Township, Johnson County (north)
- Spring Hill Township, Johnson County (northeast)
- Ten Mile Township, Miami County (east)
- Middle Creek Township, Miami County (southeast)
- Paola Township, Miami County (south)
- Richland Township, Miami County (west)

=== Major highways ===
- US-169
- K-7
- K-68
