= Osage Township, Miami County, Kansas =

Township in Miami County, Kansas, U.S.

Osage Township
- Township
- Location within Miami County
- Coordinates: 38.44523°N 94.86853°W
- Country: United States
- State: Kansas
- County: Miami

Area
  - Total: 41.161 sq mi (106.61 km^{2})
  - Land: 40.593 sq mi (105.14 km^{2})
  - Water: 0.568 sq mi (1.47 km^{2}) 1.38%

Population (2020)
  - Total: 659
  - Density: 16.2/sq mi (6.27/km^{2})
- Time zone: UTC-6 (CST)
  - Summer (DST): UTC-5 (CDT)
- Area code: 913

Osage Township is a township in Miami County, Kansas, United States. As of the 2020 census, its population was 659.

== Geography ==
Osage Township covers an area of 41.161 square miles (106.61 square kilometers). The Marais des Cygnes River flows through it.

=== Communities ===
- Fontana

=== Adjacent townships ===
- Valley Township, Miami County (north)
- Miami Township, Miami County (east)
- Scott Township, Linn County (south)
- Liberty Township, Linn County (southwest)
- Mound Township, Miami County (west)
- Osawatomie Township, Miami County (northwest)

=== Major highways ===
- K-7
