= Scott Township, Linn County, Kansas =

Township in Linn County, Kansas, U.S.

Scott Township
- Township
- Location in Linn County
- Coordinates: 38.330963°N 94.841573°W
- Country: United States
- State: Kansas
- County: Linn

Area
  - Total: 63.261 sq mi (163.85 km^{2})
  - Land: 62.213 sq mi (161.13 km^{2})
  - Water: 1.048 sq mi (2.71 km^{2}) 1.66%

Population (2020)
  - Total: 796
  - Density: 12.8/sq mi (4.94/km^{2})
- Time zone: UTC-6 (CST)
  - Summer (DST): UTC-5 (CDT)
- Area code: 913

Scott Township is a township in Linn County, Kansas, United States. As of the 2020 census, its population was 796.

== Geography ==
Scott Township covers an area of 63.261 square miles (163.85 square kilometers).

=== Communities ===
- part of La Cygne

=== Adjacent townships ===
- Osage Township, Miami County (north)
- Miami Township, Miami County (northeast)
- Lincoln Township, Linn County (east)
- Valley Township, Linn County (southeast)
- Paris Township, Linn County (south)
- Centerville Township, Linn County (southwest)
- Liberty Township, Linn County (west)
- Mound Township, Miami County (northwest)

=== Major highways ===
- K-7
- K-152
