= Potosi Township, Kansas =

Township in Linn County, Kansas, U.S.

Potosi Township
- Township
- Location in Linn County
- Coordinates: 38.177017°N 94.685828°W
- Country: United States
- State: Kansas
- County: Linn

Area
  - Total: 56.095 sq mi (145.29 km^{2})
  - Land: 54.577 sq mi (141.35 km^{2})
  - Water: 1.518 sq mi (3.93 km^{2}) 2.71%

Population (2020)
  - Total: 1,876
  - Density: 34.37/sq mi (13.27/km^{2})
- Time zone: UTC-6 (CST)
  - Summer (DST): UTC-5 (CDT)
- Area code: 913

Potosi Township is a township in Linn County, Kansas, United States. As of the 2020 census, its population was 1,876.

== Geography ==
Potosi Township covers an area of 56.095 square miles (145.29 square kilometers).

=== Communities ===
- Pleasanton

=== Adjacent townships ===
- Valley Township, Linn County (north)
- Homer Township, Bates County, Missouri (northeast)
- Walnut Township, Bates County, Missouri (east)
- Sheridan Township, Linn County (south)
- Mound City Township, Linn County (southwest)
- Paris Township, Linn County (west)

=== Major highways ===
- US-69
- K-52
