= USS Keokuk =

USS Keokuk may refer to the following ships operated by the United States Navy:

- USS Keokuk (1862), was an ironclad warship launched 6 December 1862 and was sunk by Confederate forces on 8 April 1863
- USS Keokuk (CMC-6), a mine and net layer acquired by the US Navy 28 July 1941 and sold 7 March 1947
- Keokuk (YTB-771), is a large harbor tugboat launched 21 May 1964 and currently in active service
