= Boicourt, Kansas =

Unincorporated community in Kansas, U.S.

- Unincorporated community
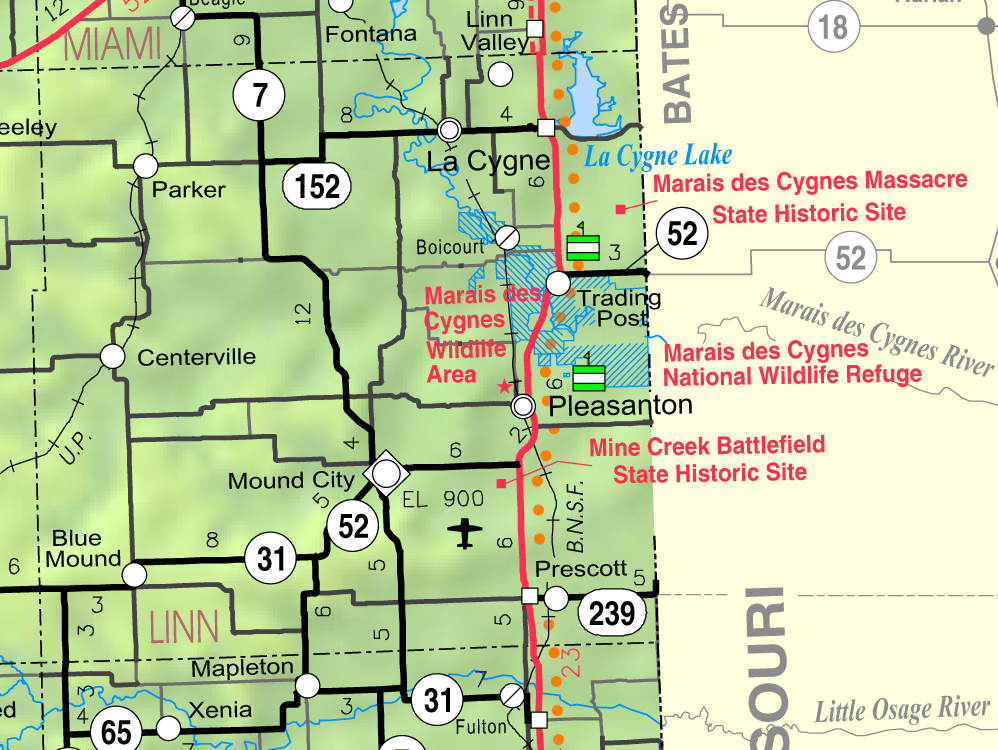
- KDOT map of Linn County (legend)

- Location within Kansas Location within the United States
- Coordinates: 38°16′15″N 94°43′13″W
- Country: United States
- State: Kansas
- County: Linn
- Elevation: 833 ft (254 m)
- Time zone: UTC-6 (CST)
  - Summer (DST): UTC-5 (CDT)
- FIPS code: 20-07850
- GNIS ID: 477707

Boicourt is an unincorporated community in Linn County, Kansas, United States.

== Features ==
There is a railroad running through Boicourt. Satellite data from Google Maps puts an estimate of 10 houses present as of 2026.

== History ==
The post office in Boicourt closed in 1964.
