= List of Kansas area codes =

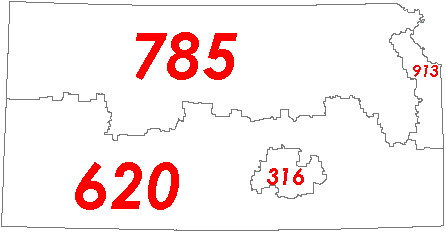
Area codes of Kansas

The U.S. state of Kansas is served with four area codes in the North American Numbering Plan, each assigned to one distinct geographic numbering plan area (NPA).

Area code	Year	Parent NPA	Numbering plan area
316	1947	–	City of Wichita and the surrounding area
620	2001	316	Southern Kansas, except Wichita area
913	1947	–	Kansas City Metropolitan Area
785	1997	913	Northern Kansas, except Kansas City area
