= Indian Creek (Little Osage River tributary) =

Stream in the US state of Missouri

Coordinates: 38.00198°N 94.64107°W

Indian Creek is a stream in Bourbon and Linn counties, in the U.S. state of Kansas.

Indian Creek was named from the fact an Indian settlement stood near its mouth.

== See also ==
- List of rivers of Kansas
