= Hobart Stocking =

American politician

Hobart M. Stocking (April 28, 1846 – August 6, 1920) was a member of the Wisconsin State Assembly.

== Biography ==
Stocking was born in Canton, New York on April 28, 1846. He attended what was then Galesville University. During the American Civil War, he was a captain with the 48th Wisconsin Volunteer Infantry Regiment of the Union Army and was a commander of Mound City's post. He married a woman 30 years his junior in the 1890s, but divorced in 1898. Stocking died in Saint Paul, Minnesota on August 6, 1920.

== Political career ==
Stocking was a member of the Assembly during the 1876 and 1889 sessions. Previously, he had been Receiver of the U.S. Land Office of Eau Claire, Wisconsin from 1869 to 1873. He was a Republican.
