= Homer Township, Bates County, Missouri =

Township in the US state of Missouri

Homer Township
- Township
- Location in Bates County
- Coordinates: 38°16′04″N 94°34′00″W
- Country: United States
- State: Missouri
- County: Bates

Area
  - Total: 34.7 sq mi (89.9 km^{2})
  - Land: 34.42 sq mi (89.16 km^{2})
  - Water: 0.29 sq mi (0.74 km^{2}) 0.82%
- Elevation: 794 ft (242 m)

Population (2000)
  - Total: 449
  - Density: 13/sq mi (5/km^{2})
- Time zone: UTC-6 (CST)
  - Summer (DST): UTC-5 (CDT)
- ZIP codes: 64722, 64723, 64730, 64752, 64779
- GNIS feature ID: 0766295

Homer Township is one of twenty-four townships in Bates County, Missouri, and is part of the Kansas City metropolitan area within the USA. As of the 2000 census, its population was 449.

== Geography ==
According to the United States Census Bureau, Homer Township covers an area of 34.71 square miles (89.9 square kilometers); of this, 34.42 square miles (89.16 square kilometers, 99.18 percent) is land and 0.28 square miles (0.74 square kilometers, 0.82 percent) is water.

=== Cities, towns, villages ===
- Amoret

=== Unincorporated towns ===
- Mulberry at 38.290578°N 94.564677°W

(This list is based on USGS data and may include former settlements.)

=== Adjacent townships ===
- West Point Township (north)
- Elkhart Township (northeast)
- Charlotte Township (east)
- Walnut Township (south)
- Potosi Township, Linn County, Kansas (southwest)
- Valley Township, Linn County, Kansas (west)
- Lincoln Township, Linn County, Kansas (northwest)

=== Cemeteries ===
The township contains these two cemeteries: Benjamin and Jackson.

=== Major highways ===
- Missouri Route 52

== School districts ==
- Hume R-VIII
- Miami R-I

== Political districts ==
- Missouri's 4th congressional district
- State House District 125
- State Senate District 31
