= Mound City's post =

- Mound City, Kansas

Site information
- Type: U.S. Army Civil War post
- Controlled by: U.S. Army

Location
- Coordinates: 38.1455°N 94.8154°W

Site history
- Built: 1860
- In use: 1860 to ca. June 1865
- Materials: wood, stone, brick

Garrison information
- Past commanders: Col. Charles R. Jennison, Lieut. Peter J. Mizerez, Col. Thomas Moonlight, Capt. Louis F. Green, Lieut. Col. S. A. Drake, Col. George H. Hoyt, Capt. Hobart M. Stocking, Maj. John M. Laing, Capt. Henry L. Barker
- Garrison: same

Mound City's post was established by 1860 in Mound City, Kansas, United States. In August 1861 U.S. Senator James H. Lane reported to the commander of Fort Leavenworth that the post was to be fortified. In fact, Mound City's post became one of the important posts guarding against Confederate guerrilla attacks along the Kansas-Missouri border. Through the War usually 200 to 300 troops at a time were stationed at the post.

Probably the most well known commander of this post was Charles Jennison, a notorious Jayhawker and Redleg, who commanded men who committed numerous depredations against Missourians who they assumed were all disloyal to the Union. Eventually Jennison's excesses caught up with him and he removed as the post's commander, arrested and finally was dishonorably discharged from the Army on June 23, 1865.

== First Battle ==
Nothing out of the routine happened at Mound City until fall 1864, when Confederate Maj. Gen. Sterling Price was nearing the end of a large raid through Missouri. As happened with other eastern Kansas military posts, the Mound City post found itself in the way of Price's army as it retreated south along the Kansas-Missouri border. Various troops were moved into and out of Mound City. Just after daybreak on October 25, 1864, 600 Confederates attacked the town, but were easily driven off by men commanded by Col. Thomas Moonlight. Lieut. Col. S. A. Drake and 300 men arrived at 7 A.M. and Moonlight left at 10 A.M. with most of his men, leaving Drake with 550 men.

Meanwhile, about 5 miles (8.0 km) to the east, the last major battle with Price's men started before dawn and raged all day. This conflict, the Battle of Mine Creek, was the final Union victory driving Price from Kansas and Missouri.

Moonlight's departure was witnessed by some of Price's scouts. Shortly after Moonlight left Mound City, 150 Confederates, probably guerrillas, attacked Drake's men from a cornfield on the northeast edge of town. These Confederates were more persistent than those who attacked at dawn and it took Drake some effort to drive them off. There was at least one Union soldier killed and a number of men on both sides were wounded. It was said eighteen Confederates were captured in this battle.

== The Wounded ==
Two hours before dawn the next day Maj. Samuel B. Davis and J. R. Brown, an agent of the U.S. Sanitary Commission, arrived on the Mine Creek battlefield to determine how many wounded were on the battlefield and how to tend to them. When dawn came, many of the wounded from both sides were loaded on ambulances and taken to Mound City, where a hospital was set up. The Union and Confederate wounded troops were put into separate buildings. It ended up that a number of buildings, including the post commissary, in town were used to house the wounded. Fifty-six Union and sixty-two Confederate wounded soldiers were taken to Mound City. Fort Leavenworth received 300 wounded from Mine Creek.

As the wounded improved they were sent away. Sixteen of the Confederate and three of the Union wounded died. The last wounded were sent away in April 1865. The post in town remained even then, but was scaled down. Probably the post was discontinued in June 1865.
