= Centerville, Kansas =

- CDP
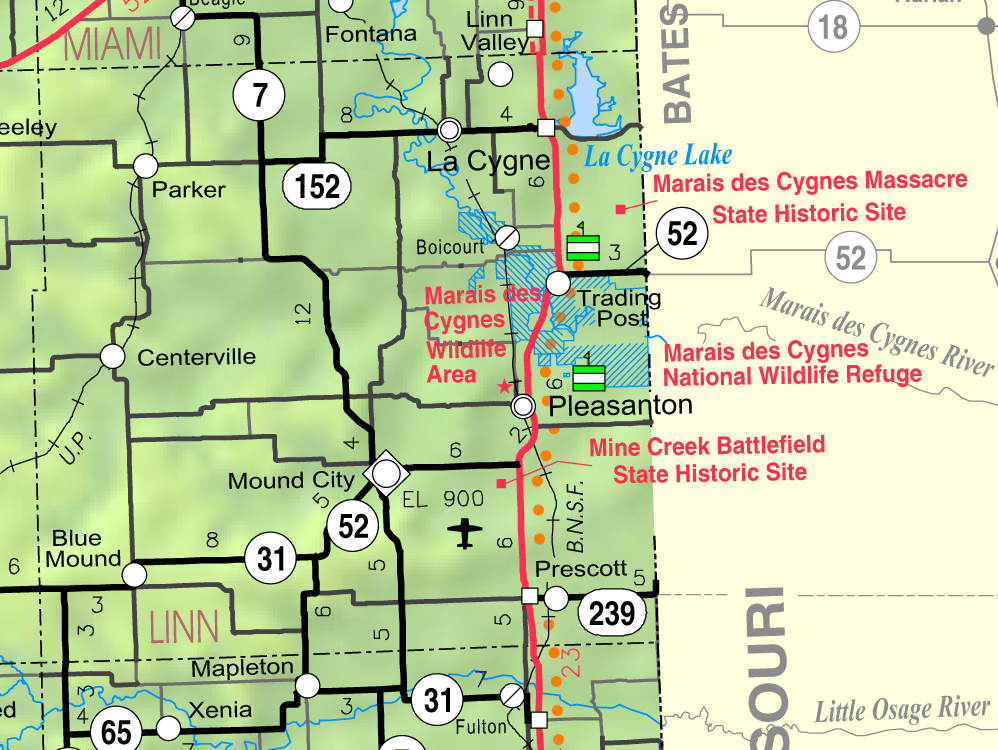
- KDOT map of Linn County (legend)

- Location within Kansas Location within the United States
- Coordinates: 38°13′44″N 95°00′53″W
- Country: United States
- State: Kansas
- County: Linn
- Founded: 1855
- Elevation: 938 ft (286 m)

Population (2020)
  - Total: 78
- Time zone: UTC-6 (CST)
  - Summer (DST): UTC-5 (CDT)
- ZIP Code: 66014
- Area code: 913
- FIPS code: 20-12325
- GNIS ID: 2804493

Centerville is a census-designated place (CDP) in Linn County, Kansas, United States. As of the 2020 census, the population was 78. It is located 8.5 miles (13.7 km) north of the city of Blue Mound.

== History ==
The first post office in Centerville was established in March 1855. Currently, Centerville has a post office with ZIP Code 66014. The Kansas City branch of the Missouri-Kansas-Texas Railroad runs through Centerville. The railroad supported local industries, a grain elevator and a passenger depot. The old Amoco Pumphouse building was converted to an event venue in 2007.

== Geography ==
=== Climate ===
The climate in this area is characterized by hot, humid summers and generally mild to cool winters. According to the Köppen Climate Classification system, Centerville has a humid subtropical climate, abbreviated "Cfa" on climate maps.

== Demographics ==
Historical population
Census	Pop.	Note	%±
2020	78		—
U.S. Decennial Census

The 2020 United States census counted 78 people, 31 households, and 24 families in Centerville. The population density was 42.4 per square mile (16.4/km^{2}). There were 33 housing units at an average density of 17.9 per square mile (6.9/km^{2}). The racial makeup was 80.77% (63) white or European American (78.21% non-Hispanic white), 2.56% (2) black or African-American, 0.0% (0) Native American or Alaska Native, 0.0% (0) Asian, 0.0% (0) Pacific Islander or Native Hawaiian, 2.56% (2) from other races, and 14.1% (11) from two or more races. Hispanic or Latino of any race was 3.85% (3) of the population.

Of the 31 households, 38.7% had children under the age of 18; 67.7% were married couples living together; 12.9% had a female householder with no spouse or partner present. 22.6% of households consisted of individuals and 12.9% had someone living alone who was 65 years of age or older. The percent of those with a bachelor's degree or higher was estimated to be 0.0% of the population.

35.9% of the population was under the age of 18, 7.7% from 18 to 24, 15.4% from 25 to 44, 24.4% from 45 to 64, and 16.7% who were 65 years of age or older. The median age was 37.0 years. For every 100 females, there were 129.4 males. For every 100 females ages 18 and older, there were 138.1 males.

== Education ==
The community is served by Prairie View USD 362 public school district.

== Notable people ==
Centerville was the birthplace of the dancer and choreographer Wayne Lamb.
