= West Point Township, Bates County, Missouri =

Township in the US state of Missouri

West Point Township
- Township
- Location in Bates County
- Coordinates: 38°21′06″N 94°33′47″W
- Country: United States
- State: Missouri
- County: Bates

Area
  - Total: 33.00 sq mi (85.46 km^{2})
  - Land: 32.88 sq mi (85.15 km^{2})
  - Water: 0.12 sq mi (0.31 km^{2}) 0.36%
- Elevation: 850 ft (260 m)

Population (2000)
  - Total: 573
  - Density: 17/sq mi (6.7/km^{2})
- Time zone: UTC-6 (CST)
  - Summer (DST): UTC-5 (CDT)
- ZIP code: 64723
- GNIS feature ID: 0766312

West Point Township is one of twenty-four townships in Bates County, Missouri, and is part of the Kansas City metropolitan area within the USA. As of the 2000 census, its population was 573.

West Point Township took its name from the community of West Point, which is now considered a ghost town.

== Geography ==
According to the United States Census Bureau, West Point Township covers an area of 33 square miles (85.46 square kilometers); of this, 32.88 square miles (85.15 square kilometers, 99.64 percent) is land and 0.12 square miles (0.31 square kilometers, 0.36 percent) is water.

=== Cities, towns, villages ===
- Amsterdam

=== Adjacent townships ===
- West Boone Township (north)
- East Boone Township (northeast)
- Elkhart Township (east)
- Charlotte Township (southeast)
- Homer Township (south)
- Lincoln Township, Linn County, Kansas (west)
- Sugar Creek Township, Miami County, Kansas (northwest)

=== Cemeteries ===
The township contains these three cemeteries: Forbes, Walley and West Point.

=== Landmarks ===
- City Park

== School districts ==
- Miami R-I

== Political districts ==
- Missouri's 4th congressional district
- State House District 125
- State Senate District 31
