= Trading Post's fort =

Fort in Kansas, US (1842–1865)

- Trading Post, Kansas

Site information
- Type: United States Army post
- Controlled by: Various army units

Location
- Coordinates: 38°14′54″N 94°41′06″W

Site history
- Built: 1842
- In use: 1842, c. spring 1861 – summer 1865
- Materials: Wood, stone

Garrison information
- Past commanders: various, including Col. Charles R. Jennison, Capt. Benjamin F. Goss, Col. Edward Lynde, Lieut. Col. George S. Hoyt, Capt. Ezekiel Bunn, Capt. John L. Thompson, Maj. Gen. Sterling Price, Capt. Charles O. Smith, Lieut. Henry L. Barker
- Garrison: Same

In 1842, a large log fort was built at Trading Post, Kansas, by the United States Army, upon the order of General Winfield Scott. This fort was on the Fort Leavenworth-Fort Gibson Military Road. The completed fort was fairly elaborate. It included space to house a company of dragoons and their horses. Also, it contained a hospital and store houses. Gaps along the outside walls of buildings were filled in with stockade walls. The buildings were built around a large interior open area.

In spite of the considerable work going into the fort's construction, it was used for only a short time, possibly only weeks. The troops there abandoned the fort and moved further south to build Fort Scott. Private individuals made use of the fort and troops did not use it until 1861, when the American Civil War erupted.

The first time the use of Trading Post's fort was mentioned during the Civil War was when troops were stationed there in September 1861, although it appears they soon left. Between early 1862 and June 1864 Trading Post was almost continuously occupied by troops. In 1862 Col. Charles R. Jennison led troops stationed there, but the settlers complained about their unruliness. Jennison's men were then removed.

In October 1864, the troops at Trading Post were removed and sent to Missouri to meet Confederate forces under Maj. Gen. Sterling Price. After Price was defeated October 23 in the Battle of Westport, his forces moved south along the Kansas-Missouri border. The next day some of his men occupied Trading Post and two imposing hills north of town. Price himself was with them. Union forces arrived in the evening and at 3 AM October 25 the Battle of Marais des Cygnes began. The Union forces dislodged the Confederates from the hills and then about daylight charged into Trading Post, capturing 100 Confederates. All Confederate forces retreated south and later that day the Battle of Mine Creek forced the Confederates to continue their southward march toward Arkansas.

Soon after Price left the area, troops were sent to garrison Trading Post again. A stable and some living quarters were built in February 1865. Troops remained until at least early June 1865. After troops left for good, the old fort was occupied for a time by two families. Later it was demolished, as a road was built through the fort.
