= Elkhart Township, Bates County, Missouri =

Elkhart Township
- Township
- Location in Bates County
- Coordinates: 38°20′24″N 94°26′46″W
- Country: United States
- State: Missouri
- County: Bates

Area
  - Total: 35.54 sq mi (92.05 km^{2})
  - Land: 35.46 sq mi (91.83 km^{2})
  - Water: 0.085 sq mi (0.22 km^{2}) 0.24%
- Elevation: 850 ft (260 m)

Population (2000)
  - Total: 304
  - Density: 8.5/sq mi (3.3/km^{2})
- Time zone: UTC-6 (CST)
  - Summer (DST): UTC-5 (CDT)
- ZIP codes: 64720, 64722, 64723, 64730
- GNIS feature ID: 0766293

Elkhart Township is one of twenty-four townships in Bates County, Missouri, and is part of the Kansas City metropolitan area within the USA. As of the 2000 census, its population was 304.

== History ==
Elkhart Township was established in the 1860s. The name is a transfer from Elkhart, Indiana.

== Geography ==
According to the United States Census Bureau, Elkhart Township covers an area of 35.54 square miles (92.05 square kilometers); of this, 35.45 square miles (91.83 square kilometers, 99.76 percent) is land and 0.09 square miles (0.22 square kilometers, 0.24 percent) is water.

=== Adjacent townships ===
- East Boone Township (north)
- Deer Creek Township (northeast)
- Mound Township (east)
- Mount Pleasant Township (southeast)
- Charlotte Township (south)
- Homer Township (southwest)
- West Point Township (west)
- West Boone Township (northwest)

=== Cemeteries ===
The township contains these two cemeteries: Howell and Scott.

== School districts ==
- Adrian R-III School District
- Butler R-V School District
- Miami R-I

== Political districts ==
- Missouri's 4th congressional district
- State House District 125
- State Senate District 31
