= Wayne Lamb =

American dancer

- Born: Marno Wayne Lamb; October 24, 1920; Centerville, Kansas
- Died: June 5, 2001 (aged 80); Augusta, Michigan
- Occupations: Broadway dancer; Choreographer; Theatre director; Professor of dance

Marno "Wayne" Lamb (October 24, 1920 – June 5, 2001) was a Broadway dancer, choreographer, theatre director and professor of dance.

== Beginnings in Kansas ==
Lamb was born in Centerville, Kansas, to Marno W. and Clara (Burdue) Lamb. He attended the University of Wichita and the University of Kansas, where he studied dancing.

== Earl Carroll's Vanities ==
He left college to tour with Earl Carroll's Vanities, playing five shows a day on the movie circuit for three months. "They said I had to be in Kansas City the next morning if I was interested in joining them. So, I quickly quit school and joined the show." The movie circuit consisted of performing between movie screenings at theatres nationwide.

== Military service ==
His fledgling career was interrupted by the World War II draft. He spent the next three years in an Army uniform, chauffeuring officers and the occasional entertainer around Europe, such as Marlene Dietrich and Dinah Shore. He served in France, Belgium, Holland, England and Germany as a staff sergeant and earned the Bronze Star.

== Study in New York ==
After his discharge and the GI bill, he went to New York City, where he immediately enrolled at the former Alviene School for the Dramatic Arts, where Fred Astaire studied. He was also a student at the American Theatre Wing from 1947–50, studying dance with Russian ballet teachers Helena Platova and Edward Caton, English ballet teachers Antony Tudor and Margaret Craske, Modern dance pioneers Martha Graham, Hanya Holm and Doris Humphrey, Japanese modern teacher Yeichi Nimura, and African-American modern dance innovator Katherine Dunham.

=== Studying with Doris Humphrey ===
Jack Ragotzy recalls a story Lamb told about choreographing a poem for Doris Humphrey: "After the piece was presented," he said, "she gave me the best advice of my life. 'Never work on anything unless you can add something of yourself. If you can't add something of yourself, the work is already complete and there is no need for you to spend your time or energy on it.'"

== Professional beginnings ==
Lamb joined the national touring company of The Day Before Spring, which closed three days after its debut in Chicago during a crippling coal strike. A month later, he would receive his Broadway debut.

== Broadway ==
Lamb appeared in six Broadway musicals. He first appeared as a solo dancer in the 1946 revival of the Franz Lehár operetta Yours is My Heart at the Shubert Theatre, lasting two months; Bloomer Girl, also at the Shubert Theatre starring Celeste Holm with choreography by Agnes Demille, and the musical revue Make Mine Manhattan (1948–1949) at the Broadhurst Theatre with Sid Caesar, which ran for 429 performances. Other Broadway shows included The Day Before Spring, which opened on November 22, 1945, at the National Theatre, where it ran for 167 performances, and the national company of Call Me Mister, which included Bob Fosse, Carl Reiner and Buddy Hackett in the cast. Wayne was the ballet dancer, and Bob Fosse the tap dancer in this production. The show ran 15 months in venues all over the country. Lamb was in the Pre-Broadway tryout of Bonanza Bound, choreographed by Jack Cole and included Gwen Verdon in the chorus with Lamb. Writer/Director Joe Stockdale recalls Jack Ragotsy's first impression of Lamb in Call Me Mister in Chicago: "As a young dancer, he had an animal grace that was electric in its force and energy."

He also worked with actress Vivian Blaine, writer Mel Brooks, director George S. Kaufman and comedian Imogene Coca.

== Off-Broadway ==
Lamb is listed in the Broadway World Internet Database as the choreographer for two Off-Broadway productions of Shakespeare, including A Midsummer Night's Dream in 1956 at the Jan Hus Playhouse and Twelfth Night in 1957 at the Shakespearewrights Theatre.

== International tour ==
Lamb toured internationally from 1948 to 1950 as a concert dancer with the Elena Imaz International Dance Trio, presenting Spanish dances created by Imaz, originally from Argentina. They also appeared in the Carnegie Hall Summer Concerts. A picture of Lamb with the trio is featured in the January 10, 1951 edition of the Sarasota Herald Tribune.

== Television ==
Lamb performed as a regular dancer on The Admiral Broadway Review, which became Your Show of Shows in 1950, working with Buddy Hacket, Nancy Walker and Imogene Coca. From 1952 to 1955, other appearances included Toast of the Town (later called The Ed Sullivan Show), Stop the Music with Bert Parks, The Tony Martin Show, The Ezio Pinza Show, the Bob Hope television specials, and The Colgate Comedy Hour. Wayne declared that he was the first to wear a dance belt on television in an early version of The Burl Ives Show. Lamb elaborated for the Kalamazoo Gazette: "They wouldn't allow me to stand up straight for fear the American public would see my crotch!"

== Barn Theatre ==
In 1955, Lamb's interest in choreography led him to The Barn Theatre, a summer stock theatre in Augusta, Michigan, where he began directing musicals and plays alongside his companion, Angelo Mango, who was also an actor. His first assignment for the Barn was choreography for Jack Ragotzy's South Pacific. The Holland, Michigan Evening Sentinel from June 1971 states that Lamb's first show for the 1971 summer season was Hello Dolly, which opened June 29, 1971, with Jack Ragotzy as producer and Lamb as Associate Producer. The cast included Angelo Mango. A 1978 Barn Theatre program bio states that Lamb had been with the Barn for 23 years and shares "top artistic and managerial decisions with Jack Ragotzy" (artistic director). Lamb was the Associate Producer at that time.

== Professional teaching ==
Lamb was the instructor of ballet classes for the New Dance Group in New York City and director of the ballet department for seven years, from 1950–57, 'teaching whenever I was in town.' In 1958, he was Director of the School of Dance and Fine Arts in Hastings, Michigan. In 1967, he taught dance classes for Diamond Head Theatre in Hawaii.

== University teaching ==
Lamb taught dance for Eureka College (Illinois) in 1959, Williams College in 1962, and the University of Massachusetts Amherst from 1964 to 1966.

== Purdue University ==
His teaching relationship with Purdue University began in 1960 and lasted until 1986. He was promoted to assistant professor in 1971 and is listed as an associate professor in a 1978 Barn Theatre program bio. His specialty was teaching ballet, broadway jazz dance, allroom and tap dance.

=== Choreography ===
He provided choreography for Annie Get Your Gun, The Boy Friend, Damn Yankees, Kiss Me Kate, West Side Story, My Fair Lady, Gypsy, The Me Nobody Knows, A Funny Thing Happened on the Way to the Forum, Once Upon a Mattress, A Midsummer Night's Dream (twice), Bury the Dead and Guys and Dolls.

=== Direction and choreography ===
He provided direction and choreography for Irma la Douce, Oliver!, Marat/Sade, Leave It to Jane, The Owl and the Pussycat, Man of La Mancha, The Killing of Sister George, Light Up the Sky, A Flea in Her Ear, George M, The Amorous Flea, Fiddler on the Roof, Our Town, Tobacco Road, The Music Man and Carousel, all with musical direction by longtime theatre colleague Dorothy Runk Mennen.

=== USO Show ===
For Purdue, Lamb directed a 1974 USO Show touring the United States Pacific Command, playing 52 shows to approximately 10,678 troops in Alaska, Korea, Japan, Okinawa, Taiwan, the Philippines, Guam and Hawaii.

== Affiliations ==
Lamb was a member of the Society of Stage Directors and Choreographers, Actors' Equity Association, American Federation of Television and Radio Artists and the American Association of Community Theatre.

== Honors ==
He received the title of Professor Emeritus of Theatre in 1987.

At the new Pao Hall for the Performing Arts on the Purdue University campus, the Wayne Lamb Lobby was dedicated soon after the center's opening.

He was honored posthumously at Purdue University Theatre's October 2010 Legacy weekend. Purdue University Theatre's website explains: (This is an honor) 'recognizing and honoring professionals and professors who have had a profound impact upon Purdue Theatre and the professional theatre.' It was also a way for our current and future students – and the faculty and staff of Purdue Theatre – to know of our history, about the careers of these individuals and how their contributions have shaped the lives and careers of so many others.' In an evening of memories, former students Dr. Anne Fliotsos and Rev. Donald Stikeleather offered dance steps and memories of Wayne. A plaque with his name was placed adjacent to a theater on campus.

== Death ==
After his retirement from Purdue, Lamb and partner Angelo Mango lived part time in Augusta and New York City, until his death on June 5, 2001, in Augusta, Michigan.
