= Blue Mound (Vernon County, Missouri) =

Summit in the US state of Missouri

Coordinates: 38°00′21″N 94°12′53″W

Blue Mound is a summit in Vernon County in the U.S. state of Missouri. The peak has an elevation of 928 feet (283 m).

Variant names were "Blue Mounds" and "Twin Mounds". The summit was named for its characteristic bluish hue when viewed from afar.
