= Everett Township, Cass County, Missouri =

Township in Cass County, Missouri, U.S.

Coordinates: 38.5217°N 94.4583°W

Everett Township is an inactive township in Cass County, in the U.S. state of Missouri.

Everett Township was established in 1872, taking its name from Everett, Missouri.
