= Mantey, Kansas =

Unincorporated community in Kansas, U.S.

Coordinates: 38°03′08″N 94°48′21″W

Mantey is an unincorporated community in Linn County, Kansas, United States.

== History ==
The post office in Mantey closed in 1905.
