= Farlinville, Kansas =

Unincorporated community in Kansas, U.S.

Coordinates: 38°14′00″N 94°51′14″W

Farlinville is an unincorporated community in Linn County, Kansas, United States.

== History ==
Farlinville had a post office from the 1860s until 1917.
