= Keokuk (YTB-771) =

Tugboat of the United States Navy

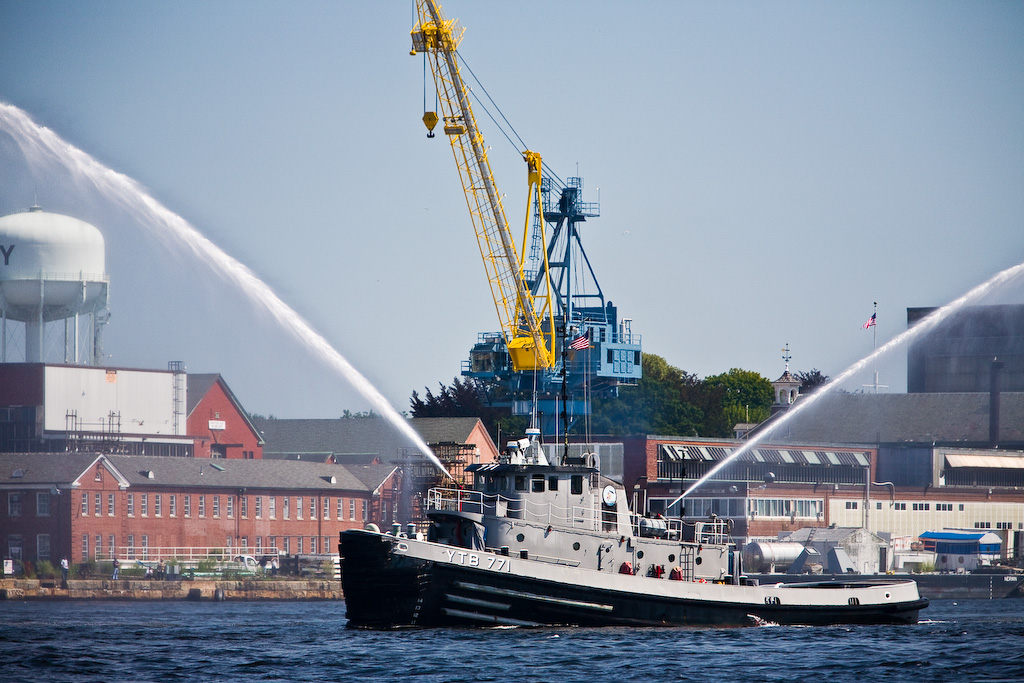

History

United States
- Awarded: 18 January 1963
- Builder: Mobile Ship Repair Inc., Mobile, Alabama
- Laid down: 5 December 1963
- Launched: 21 May 1964
- Commissioned: 4 September 1964
- Out of service: 29 August 2023
- Stricken: 29 August 2023
- Homeport: Portsmouth Naval Shipyard
- Identification: MMSI number: 367421860; Callsign: WDE9836
- Status: Disposed of by General Services Administration

General characteristics
- Class & type: Natick-class large harbor tug
- Displacement: 283 long tons (288 t) (light); 356 long tons (362 t) (full)
- Length: 109 ft (33 m)
- Beam: 31 ft (9.4 m)
- Draft: 14 ft (4.3 m)
- Speed: 12 knots (22 km/h; 14 mph)
- Complement: 12

Keokuk (YTB-771) is a United States Navy Natick-class large harbor tug named for Keokuk, Iowa, and the third navy ship to carry the name.

== Construction ==
The contract for Keokuk was awarded 18 January 1963. She was laid down on 5 December 1963 at Mobile, Alabama, by Mobile Ship Repair and launched 21 May 1964. Placed in service 4 September 1964, Chief Boatswain's Mate Jerry R. Richter in command.

== Operational history ==
Keokuk served in the Norfolk, Virginia, area as a tug and was in active service at the Portsmouth Naval Shipyard. On August 29, 2023 Keokuk was stricken from the naval registrey and disposed of by the General Service Administration.
