= Serenade No. 6 (Mozart) =

- Serenata notturna
- by W. A. Mozart
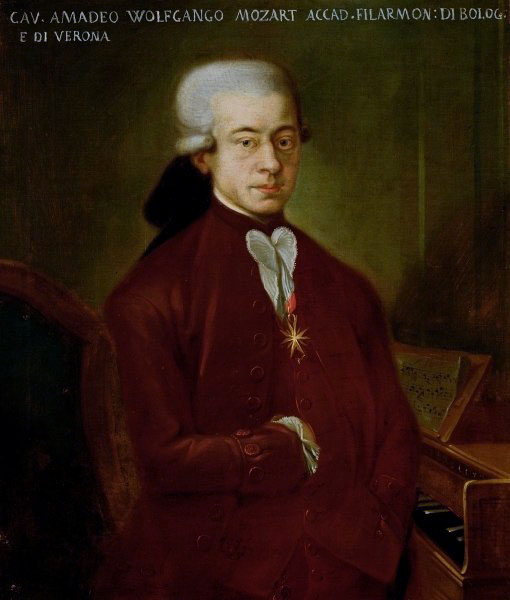
- 1777 Bologna portrait of Mozart
- Key: D major
- Catalogue: K. 239
- Composed: 1776
- Duration: c. 13 minutes
- Movements: 3
- Scoring: Strings and timpani

The Serenade No. 6 in D major, K. 239, Serenata notturna, was written by Wolfgang Amadeus Mozart in Salzburg, in 1776, for a group of four soloists and orchestra. Mozart's father, Leopold Mozart, wrote the title and a January 1776 date on the original manuscript.

It has three movements.

1. Marcia (maestoso)
2. Minuetto
3. Rondo (allegretto)

It is a concertante work for a group of four soloists, two violins, viola and double bass, and a string orchestra with two violins, one viola, one cello, and one timpani.

The title Serenata notturna has also been used by Robin Holloway for a work for four horns and orchestra (his opus 52, 1982).
