= Timberhill Township, Kansas =

Timberhill Township
- Township
- Location in Bourbon County
- Coordinates: 37°59′39″N 094°52′43″W
- Country: United States
- State: Kansas
- County: Bourbon

Area
  - Total: 35.9 sq mi (92.9 km^{2})
  - Land: 35.85 sq mi (92.85 km^{2})
  - Water: 0.019 sq mi (0.05 km^{2}) 0.05%
- Elevation: 840 ft (256 m)

Population (2000)
  - Total: 256
  - Density: 7.3/sq mi (2.8/km^{2})
- GNIS feature ID: 0474548

Timberhill Township is a township in Bourbon County, Kansas, United States. As of the 2000 census, its population was 256.

== Geography ==
Timberhill Township covers an area of 35.87 square miles (92.9 km^{2}) and contains one incorporated settlement, Mapleton. According to the USGS, it contains three cemeteries: Dayton, Morris and Northway.

The Little Osage River and smaller streams of Baker Branch, Opossum Creek, Reagan Branch and Tippie Creek run through this township.
