= Paris Township, Kansas =

Township in Linn County, Kansas, US

Paris Township
- Township
- Location in Linn County
- Coordinates: 38°13′49″N 94°50′1″W
- Country: United States
- State: Kansas
- County: Linn

Area
  - Land: 65 sq mi (170 km^{2})
- Elevation: 978 ft (298 m)

Population (2020)
  - Total: 503
  - Density: 7.7/sq mi (3.0/km^{2})
- FIPS code: 54375

Paris Township is a township in Linn County, Kansas, United States.

== History ==
Paris Township was organized in 1857.

== Demographics ==
In the 1870 census, Paris Township was recorded as having a population of 1,396 people. In the 1880 census, the township is recorded as having a population of 1,500 people. In 1882 it was recorded as having a population of 1,048 people.

=== Communities ===
- Farlinville

=== Adjacent townships ===
- Scott Township, Linn County (north)
- Valley Township, Linn County (northeast)
- Potosi Township, Linn County (east)
- Mound City Township, Linn County (south)
- Centerville Township, Linn County (west)

=== Major highways ===
- K-7
