= Trading Post, Kansas =

Unincorporated community in the United States

- Unincorporated community
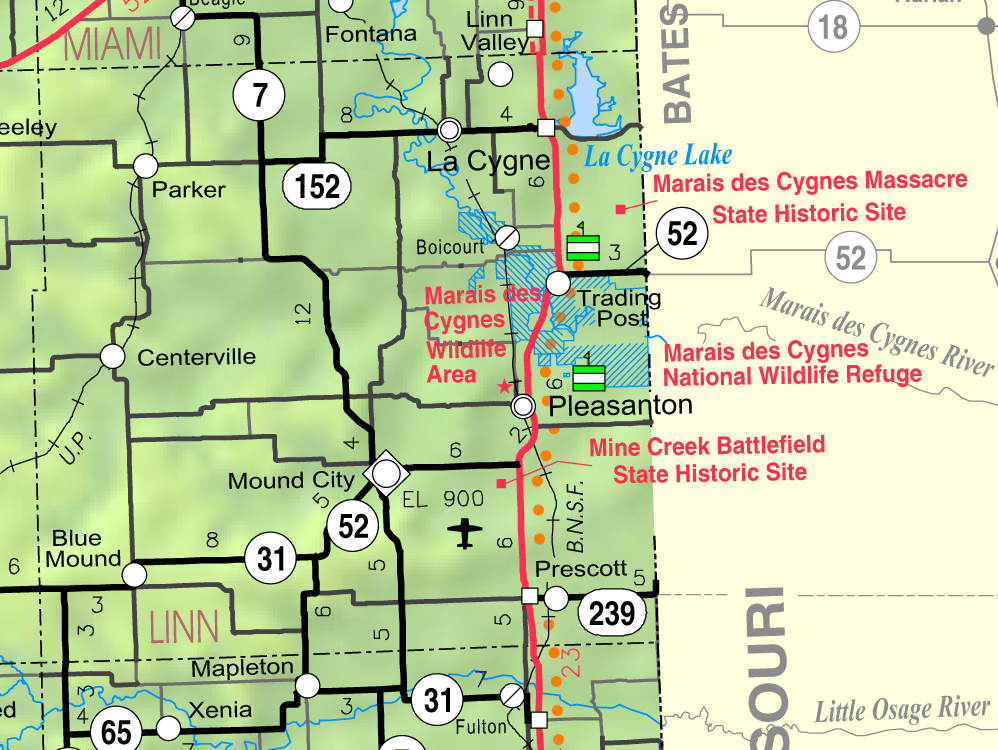
- KDOT map of Linn County (legend)

- Location within Kansas Location within the United States
- Coordinates: 38°14′55″N 94°40′51″W
- Country: United States
- State: Kansas
- County: Linn
- Founded: 1842
- Elevation: 807 ft (246 m)
- Time zone: UTC-6 (CST)
  - Summer (DST): UTC-5 (CDT)
- Area code: 913
- FIPS code: 20-71275
- GNIS ID: 477932

Trading Post is an unincorporated community in Linn County, Kansas, United States.

== History ==
Trading Post is said to be one of the oldest continuously occupied locations in Kansas. A United States Army fort was built there in 1842. It was abandoned shortly after the end of the Civil War. A military post was established in 1861 and lasted until summer 1865. The Battle of Marais des Cygnes was fought here during the American Civil War. The location derives its name from a French trading post established there about 1825.

The site is also the location of the Marais des Cygnes massacre on May 19, 1858, when Charles Hamilton was forced out of the state by Jayhawkers, freedom fighters from Kansas fighting for anti-slavery and individual liberty rights in Kansas. Hamilton returned with border ruffians from Missouri and captured 11 unarmed Jayhawkers. Hamilton and his men lead the unarmed Free-Staters into a gorge. Five of the Jayhawkers were executed on the spot by the Missouri border ruffians, five were wounded and one escaped. John Brown was to visit the site and built a fort.
