= Freedom Township, Bourbon County, Kansas =

Freedom Township
- Township
- Location in Bourbon County
- Coordinates: 37°59′38″N 094°46′06″W
- Country: United States
- State: Kansas
- County: Bourbon

Area
  - Total: 43.80 sq mi (113.43 km^{2})
  - Land: 43.72 sq mi (113.23 km^{2})
  - Water: 0.073 sq mi (0.19 km^{2}) 0.17%
- Elevation: 830 ft (253 m)

Population (2000)
  - Total: 505
  - Density: 12/sq mi (4.5/km^{2})
- GNIS feature ID: 0474563

Freedom Township is a township in Bourbon County, Kansas, United States. As of the 2000 census, its population was 505.

== Geography ==
Freedom Township covers an area of 43.79 square miles (113.4 km^{2}) and contains one incorporated settlement, Fulton. According to the USGS, it contains three cemeteries: Avondale, Glendale, and Zion.

The Little Osage River and smaller streams of Clever Creek, East Laberdie Creek, Elk Creek, Elm Creek, Laberdie Creek, Lost Creek, and West Laberdie Creek run through this township.
