= Blue Mound Township, McLean County, Illinois =

Coordinates: 40°31′55″N 88°45′06″W

Blue Mound Township
- Township
- Location in McLean County

- McLean County's location in Illinois
- Country: United States
- State: Illinois
- County: McLean
- Established: November 3, 1857

Area
  - Total: 37.75 sq mi (97.8 km^{2})
  - Land: 37.75 sq mi (97.8 km^{2})
  - Water: 0 sq mi (0 km^{2}) 0%

Population (2010)
  - Estimate (2016): 436
  - Density: 11.7/sq mi (4.5/km^{2})
- Time zone: UTC-6 (CST)
  - Summer (DST): UTC-5 (CDT)
- FIPS code: 17-113-06743

Blue Mound Township is located in McLean County, Illinois. As of the 2010 census, its population was 441 and it contained 202 housing units.

== Geography ==
According to the 2010 census, the township has a total area of 37.75 square miles (97.8 km^{2}), all land.

== Demographics ==
Historical population
Census	Pop.	Note	%±
2016 (est.)	436
U.S. Decennial Census
