= Peoria Township, Kansas =

Peoria Township
- Township
- Location in Franklin County
- Coordinates: 38°37′00″N 095°08′01″W
- Country: United States
- State: Kansas
- County: Franklin

Area
  - Total: 35.63 sq mi (92.28 km^{2})
  - Land: 35.56 sq mi (92.09 km^{2})
  - Water: 0.069 sq mi (0.18 km^{2}) 0.2%
- Elevation: 988 ft (301 m)

Population (2020)
  - Total: 646
  - Density: 18.2/sq mi (7.01/km^{2})
- GNIS feature ID: 0479373

Peoria Township is a township in Franklin County, Kansas, United States. As of the 2020 census, its population was 646. Peoria Township has two unincorporated communities: Peoria and Imes.

== History ==
Up to 1857 Peoria Township belonged to the Peorias, Weas and Piankeshaws. In April of that year the land was thrown upon the market. Previous to that time, a few settlers had entered the Township in anticipation of that event. Upon being offered, the land was nearly all immediately bought up at prices. During the year 1857, Albert Johnson settled and opened a store, and around his store gathered the nucleus of the future town of Peoria. It is beautifully situated on a promontory projecting between the valleys of Hickory Creek and that of the Marais des Cygnes. Albert Johnson was appointed first Postmaster, and also first Assessor, the latter appointment being made by the County Board. In the year 1859, a strife sprang up for the possession of the County seat. It was then at Minneola (then the state capitol and soon-to-be ghost town); Peoria and Mt. Vernon contended for it against Minneola and Ohio City, at the general election. Peoria was successful. Minneola forbade the removal, and a lawsuit followed in which Minneola was successful as elsewhere detailed.

The first election in Peoria was held in the fall of 1857, at which there was cast but one Democratic vote. The first Free-state meeting in Franklin County was held at Peoria.

Peoria, today, remains as a small unincorporated settlement. It is home to the historic Briles Schoolhouse, one of the best preserved one-room school houses in Franklin County.

== Geography ==
Peoria Township covers an area of 35.63 square miles (92.3 km^{2}) and contains no incorporated settlements. According to the USGS, it contains three cemeteries: Davisson, Howard, and Peoria.

The streams of Hickory Creek, Middle Creek, Ottawa Creek and Turkey Creek and the Marais des Cygnes River run through this township.

== Landmarks ==
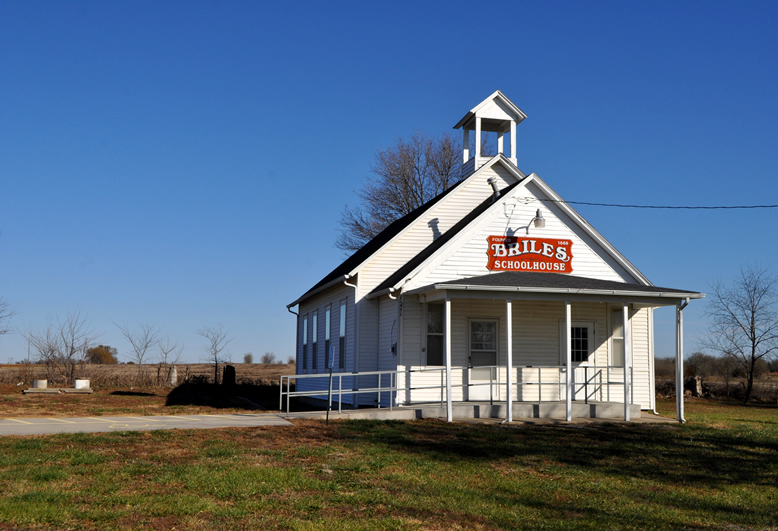
Briles One-Room School built 1868

Briles One-Room Schoolhouse, built in 1868 and closed in 1960. The school is now a community center and voting location for Peoria Township. The school, located at the intersection of Highway 68 and Texas Road, is Stop 8 on the Driving Tour of Northeast Franklin County.
