= Pottawatomie Township, Franklin County, Kansas =

Pottawatomie Township
- Township
- Location in Franklin County
- Coordinates: 38°26′00″N 095°07′16″W
- Country: United States
- State: Kansas
- County: Franklin

Area
  - Total: 39.01 sq mi (101.04 km^{2})
  - Land: 38.83 sq mi (100.58 km^{2})
  - Water: 0.18 sq mi (0.46 km^{2}) 0.46%
- Elevation: 889 ft (271 m)

Population (2020)
  - Total: 607
  - Density: 15.6/sq mi (6.03/km^{2})
- GNIS feature ID: 0477613

Pottawatomie Township is a township in Franklin County, Kansas, United States. As of the 2020 census, its population was 607.

== History ==
On May 24, 1856, during the Bleeding Kansas period of it was in Pottawatomie Township (north of Lane) at Dutch Henry's Crossing, on the Pottawatomie Creek, where the infamous Pottawatomie massacre took place. John Brown led a raid on a pro-slavery family's cabin in response to the Sacking of Lawrence. Five pro-slavery people were killed by Brown and his men. This attack was widely reported around the nation at the time and was one of several incidents that eventually led to the American Civil War.

== Geography ==
Pottawatomie Township covers an area of 39.01 square miles (101.0 km^{2}) and contains one incorporated settlement, Lane. According to the USGS, it contains three cemeteries: Baker, Lane and Needham.

The streams of Hahn Branch, Mosquito Creek, Pottawatomie Creek, North Fork Sac Branch and South Fork Sac Branch run through this township.
