= Coldwater Township, Cass County, Missouri =

Township in Missouri, United States

Coordinates: 38.5258°N 94.5569°W

Coldwater Township is an inactive township in Cass County, in the U.S. state of Missouri.

Coldwater Township was established in 1872, taking its name from Coldwater Creek.
