= Blue Mound, Kansas =

- City
- Location within Linn County and Kansas

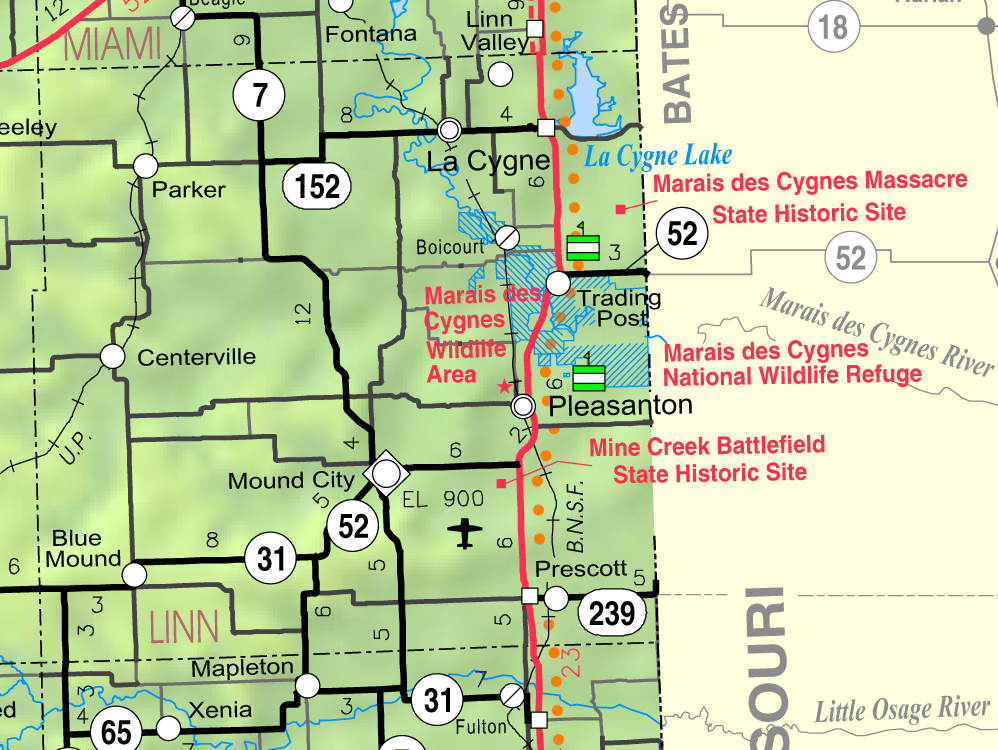
- KDOT map of Linn County (legend)
- Coordinates: 38°05′20″N 95°00′36″W
- Country: United States
- State: Kansas
- County: Linn
- Platted: 1882
- Incorporated: 1884

Area
  - Total: 0.64 sq mi (1.65 km^{2})
  - Land: 0.64 sq mi (1.65 km^{2})
  - Water: 0 sq mi (0.00 km^{2})
- Elevation: 1,043 ft (318 m)

Population (2020)
  - Total: 219
  - Density: 344/sq mi (133/km^{2})
- Time zone: UTC-6 (CST)
  - Summer (DST): UTC-5 (CDT)
- ZIP Code: 66010
- Area code: 913
- FIPS code: 20-07600
- GNIS ID: 2394204

Blue Mound is a city in Linn County, Kansas, United States. As of the 2020 census, the population of the city was 219.

== History ==
Blue Mound was laid out in 1882. It was named by its first postmaster, John Q. Adams, because its elevation is said to look blue from a distance.

== Geography ==
According to the United States Census Bureau, the city has a total area of 0.63 square miles (1.63 km^{2}), all land.

== Demographics ==
Historical population
Census	Pop.	Note	%±
1890	689		—
1900	738		7.1%
1910	596		−19.2%
1920	570		−4.4%
1930	545		−4.4%
1940	449		−17.6%
1950	424		−5.6%
1960	319		−24.8%
1970	308		−3.4%
1980	319		3.6%
1990	251		−21.3%
2000	277		10.4%
2010	275		−0.7%
2020	219		−20.4%
U.S. Decennial Census

=== 2020 census ===
The 2020 United States census counted 219 people, 95 households, and 50 families in Blue Mound. The population density was 344.3 per square mile (132.9/km^{2}). There were 125 housing units at an average density of 196.5 per square mile (75.9/km^{2}). The racial makeup was 90.41% (198) white or European American (88.58% non-Hispanic white), 0.91% (2) black or African-American, 0.0% (0) Native American or Alaska Native, 0.0% (0) Asian, 0.0% (0) Pacific Islander or Native Hawaiian, 0.46% (1) from other races, and 8.22% (18) from two or more races. Hispanic or Latino of any race was 2.28% (5) of the population.

Of the 95 households, 23.2% had children under the age of 18; 38.9% were married couples living together; 31.6% had a female householder with no spouse or partner present. 33.7% of households consisted of individuals and 17.9% had someone living alone who was 65 years of age or older. The average household size was 1.7 and the average family size was 2.1. The percent of those with a bachelor's degree or higher was estimated to be 6.8% of the population.

23.3% of the population was under the age of 18, 6.8% from 18 to 24, 22.4% from 25 to 44, 26.5% from 45 to 64, and 21.0% who were 65 years of age or older. The median age was 43.9 years. For every 100 females, there were 95.5 males. For every 100 females ages 18 and older, there were 110.0 males.

The 2016–2020 5-year American Community Survey estimates the median family income was $42,083 (+/- $15,738). Males had a median income of $31,125 (+/- $4,217) versus $20,568 (+/- $10,250) for females. The median income for those above 16 years old was $25,938 (+/- $9,562). Approximately, 25.5% of families and 35.2% of the population were below the poverty line, including 31.1% of those under the age of 18 and 25.0% of those ages 65 or over.

=== 2010 census ===
As of the census of 2010, there were 275 people, 111 households, and 75 families residing in the city. The population density was 436.5 inhabitants per square mile (168.5/km^{2}). There were 125 housing units at an average density of 198.4 per square mile (76.6/km^{2}). The racial makeup of the city was 97.5% White, 0.4% African American, 0.4% Native American, and 1.8% from two or more races.

There were 111 households, of which 33.3% had children under the age of 18 living with them, 55.9% were married couples living together, 5.4% had a female householder with no husband present, 6.3% had a male householder with no wife present, and 32.4% were non-families. 27.9% of all households were made up of individuals, and 10.8% had someone living alone who was 65 years of age or older. The average household size was 2.48 and the average family size was 3.00.

The median age in the city was 38.1 years. 25.1% of residents were under the age of 18; 7.7% were between the ages of 18 and 24; 25.4% were from 25 to 44; 28.3% were from 45 to 64; and 13.5% were 65 years of age or older. The gender makeup of the city was 50.5% male and 49.5% female.

=== 2000 census ===
As of the census of 2000, there were 277 people, 116 households, and 69 families residing in the city. The population density was 437.0 inhabitants per square mile (168.7/km^{2}). There were 136 housing units at an average density of 214.6 per square mile (82.9/km^{2}). The racial makeup of the city was 98.56% White, 0.72% Native American, and 0.72% from two or more races.

There were 116 households, out of which 32.8% had children under the age of 18 living with them, 46.6% were married couples living together, 6.0% had a female householder with no husband present, and 39.7% were non-families. 37.1% of all households were made up of individuals, and 24.1% had someone living alone who was 65 years of age or older. The average household size was 2.39, and the average family size was 3.16.

In the city, the population was spread out, with 30.3% under the age of 18, 6.5% from 18 to 24, 24.5% from 25 to 44, 20.2% from 45 to 64, and 18.4% who were 65 years of age or older. The median age was 36 years. For every 100 females, there were 103.7 males. For every 100 females age 18 and over, there were 91.1 males.

The median income for a household in the city was $21,364, and the median income for a family was $41,500. Males had a median income of $32,083 versus $15,313 for females. The per capita income for the city was $10,650. About 12.5% of families and 18.8% of the population were below the poverty line, including 12.0% of those under the age of eighteen and 17.8% of those 65 or over.
