= Mound City, Kansas =

- City and County seat
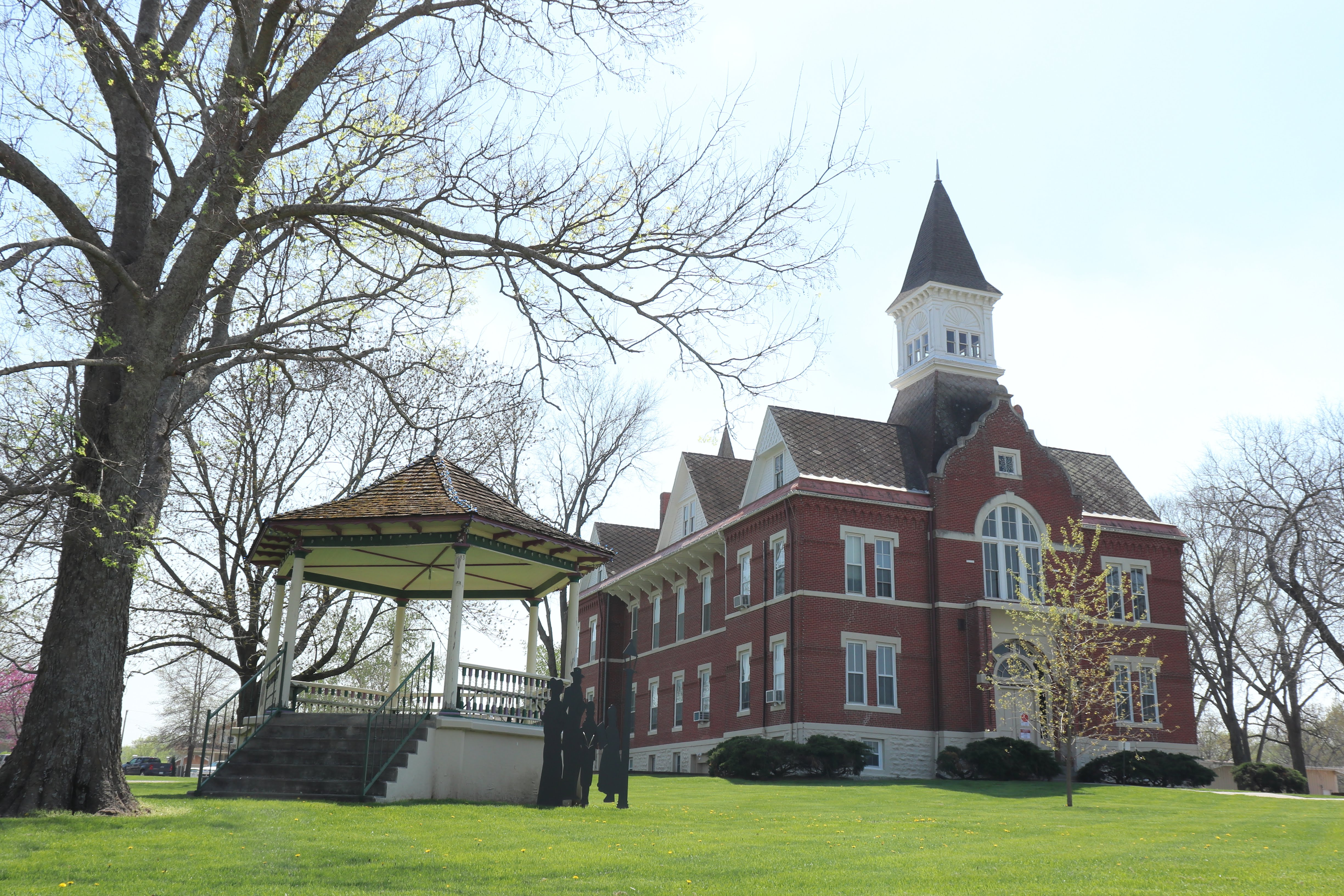
- Linn County Kansas Courthouse (2020)

- Location within Linn County and Kansas

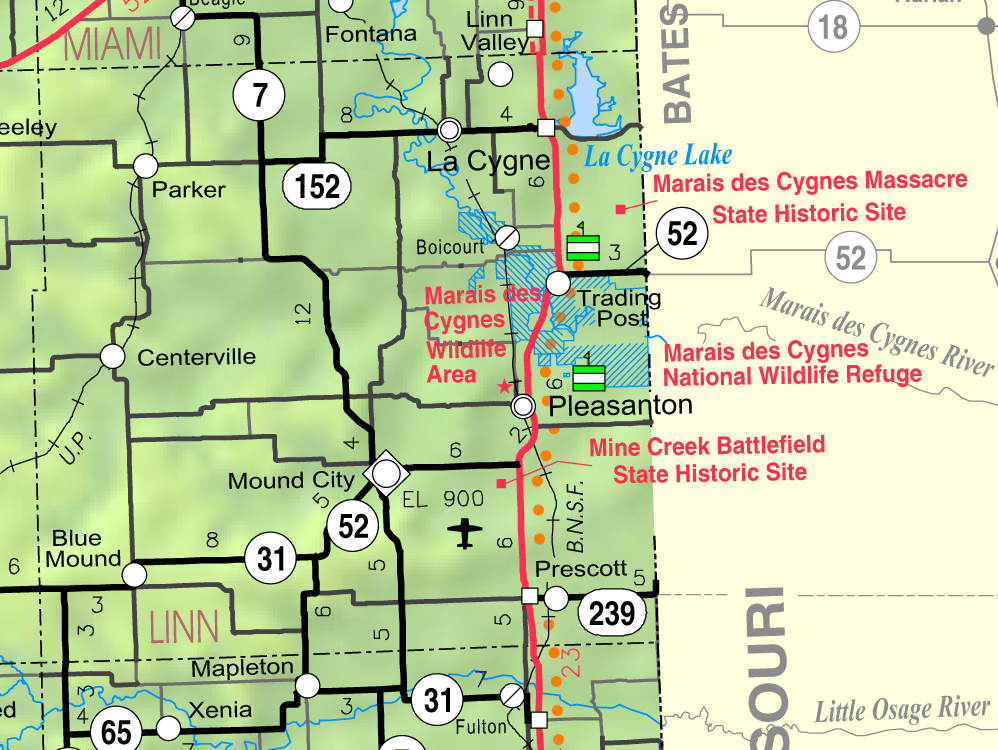
- KDOT map of Linn County (legend)
- Coordinates: 38°8′31″N 94°48′44″W
- Country: United States
- State: Kansas
- County: Linn
- Founded: 1855
- Incorporated: 1871

Government
  - Type: Mayor–Council
  - Mayor: Mat Casner

Area
  - Total: 1.36 sq mi (3.51 km^{2})
  - Land: 1.15 sq mi (2.99 km^{2})
  - Water: 0.20 sq mi (0.52 km^{2})
- Elevation: 879 ft (268 m)

Population (2020)
  - Total: 647
  - Density: 560/sq mi (216/km^{2})
- Time zone: UTC-6 (CST)
  - Summer (DST): UTC-5 (CDT)
- ZIP Code: 66056
- Area code: 913
- FIPS code: 20-48750
- GNIS ID: 477909
- Website: moundcity.org

Mound City is a city in and the county seat of Linn County, Kansas, United States. As of the 2020 census, the population of the city was 647.

== History ==
Mound City was founded in 1855. It was named from Sugar Mound nearby, a hill covered with sugar maple trees.

During the Civil War, a military post was established at Mound City. On October 25, 1864, Mound City was attacked twice by Confederates retreating south after their defeat at the Battle of Westport. The military post was closed and abandoned in June 1865 after the end of the war.

== Geography ==
According to the United States Census Bureau, the city has a total area of 1.27 square miles (3.29 km^{2}), of which 1.07 square miles (2.77 km^{2}) is land and 0.20 square miles (0.52 km^{2}) is water.

=== Climate ===
The climate in this area is characterized by hot, humid summers and generally mild to cool winters. According to the Köppen Climate Classification system, Mound City has a humid subtropical climate, abbreviated "Cfa" on climate maps.

Climate data for Mound City, Kansas, 1991–2020 normals, extremes 1949–present
Month	Jan	Feb	Mar	Apr	May	Jun	Jul	Aug	Sep	Oct	Nov	Dec	Year
Record high °F (°C)	77 (25)	81 (27)	88 (31)	93 (34)	98 (37)	107 (42)	117 (47)	110 (43)	105 (41)	97 (36)	84 (29)	76 (24)	117 (47)
Mean maximum °F (°C)	63.0 (17.2)	70.3 (21.3)	78.2 (25.7)	82.7 (28.2)	87.3 (30.7)	92.5 (33.6)	97.8 (36.6)	97.3 (36.3)	92.3 (33.5)	85.8 (29.9)	73.7 (23.2)	66.5 (19.2)	99.4 (37.4)
Mean daily maximum °F (°C)	40.8 (4.9)	45.5 (7.5)	56.3 (13.5)	65.8 (18.8)	74.4 (23.6)	83.9 (28.8)	88.5 (31.4)	87.2 (30.7)	79.4 (26.3)	68.5 (20.3)	54.9 (12.7)	44.0 (6.7)	65.8 (18.8)
Daily mean °F (°C)	30.5 (−0.8)	34.7 (1.5)	44.9 (7.2)	54.5 (12.5)	64.0 (17.8)	74.0 (23.3)	78.6 (25.9)	76.8 (24.9)	67.9 (19.9)	56.6 (13.7)	44.2 (6.8)	34.1 (1.2)	55.1 (12.8)
Mean daily minimum °F (°C)	20.2 (−6.6)	23.9 (−4.5)	33.6 (0.9)	43.1 (6.2)	53.6 (12.0)	64.2 (17.9)	68.7 (20.4)	66.3 (19.1)	56.4 (13.6)	44.6 (7.0)	33.5 (0.8)	24.2 (−4.3)	44.4 (6.9)
Mean minimum °F (°C)	1.1 (−17.2)	5.5 (−14.7)	14.4 (−9.8)	25.9 (−3.4)	38.1 (3.4)	49.7 (9.8)	56.7 (13.7)	54.5 (12.5)	40.5 (4.7)	26.5 (−3.1)	15.4 (−9.2)	4.6 (−15.2)	−5.3 (−20.7)
Record low °F (°C)	−17 (−27)	−20 (−29)	−6 (−21)	16 (−9)	27 (−3)	43 (6)	44 (7)	41 (5)	28 (−2)	17 (−8)	3 (−16)	−27 (−33)	−27 (−33)
Average precipitation inches (mm)	1.32 (34)	1.95 (50)	2.65 (67)	4.44 (113)	5.33 (135)	5.29 (134)	4.60 (117)	3.55 (90)	3.97 (101)	3.57 (91)	2.71 (69)	1.88 (48)	41.26 (1,049)
Average snowfall inches (cm)	3.4 (8.6)	2.4 (6.1)	0.7 (1.8)	trace	0.0 (0.0)	0.0 (0.0)	0.0 (0.0)	0.0 (0.0)	0.0 (0.0)	0.0 (0.0)	0.5 (1.3)	3.2 (8.1)	10.2 (25.9)
Average precipitation days (≥ 0.01 in)	6.4	4.7	7.7	9.8	11.5	9.0	8.6	6.8	8.4	8.5	6.7	5.1	93.2
Average snowy days (≥ 0.1 in)	2.0	1.7	0.4	0.0	0.0	0.0	0.0	0.0	0.0	0.0	0.3	1.8	6.2
Source 1: NOAA (snow/snow days 1981–2010)
Source 2: National Weather Service

== Demographics ==
Historical population
Census	Pop.	Note	%±
1870	645		—
1880	443		−31.3%
1890	888		100.5%
1900	809		−8.9%
1910	698		−13.7%
1920	720		3.2%
1930	655		−9.0%
1940	703		7.3%
1950	707		0.6%
1960	661		−6.5%
1970	714		8.0%
1980	755		5.7%
1990	789		4.5%
2000	821		4.1%
2010	694		−15.5%
2020	647		−6.8%
U.S. Decennial Census

=== 2020 census ===
The 2020 United States census counted 647 people, 285 households, and 183 families in Mound City. The population density was 559.7 per square mile (216.1/km^{2}). There were 317 housing units at an average density of 274.2 per square mile (105.9/km^{2}). The racial makeup was 92.89% (601) white or European American (91.5% non-Hispanic white), 0.93% (6) black or African-American, 0.77% (5) Native American or Alaska Native, 0.15% (1) Asian, 0.15% (1) Pacific Islander or Native Hawaiian, 0.93% (6) from other races, and 4.17% (27) from two or more races. Hispanic or Latino of any race was 3.55% (23) of the population.

Of the 285 households, 26.0% had children under the age of 18; 46.0% were married couples living together; 28.8% had a female householder with no spouse or partner present. 31.9% of households consisted of individuals and 14.7% had someone living alone who was 65 years of age or older. The average household size was 2.0 and the average family size was 2.5. The percent of those with a bachelor's degree or higher was estimated to be 23.0% of the population.

23.2% of the population was under the age of 18, 4.5% from 18 to 24, 24.3% from 25 to 44, 25.5% from 45 to 64, and 22.6% who were 65 years of age or older. The median age was 43.4 years. For every 100 females, there were 112.1 males. For every 100 females ages 18 and older, there were 115.2 males.

The 2016–2020 5-year American Community Survey estimates show that the median household income was $34,688 (with a margin of error of +/- $13,964) and the median family income was $57,500 (+/- $15,751). Males had a median income of $41,484 (+/- $7,672) versus $22,212 (+/- $5,991) for females. The median income for those above 16 years old was $34,479 (+/- $13,050). Approximately, 18.1% of families and 16.7% of the population were below the poverty line, including 18.6% of those under the age of 18 and 6.7% of those ages 65 or over.

=== 2010 census ===
As of the census of 2010, there were 694 people, 297 households, and 177 families residing in the city. The population density was 648.6 inhabitants per square mile (250.4/km^{2}). There were 351 housing units at an average density of 328.0 per square mile (126.6/km^{2}). The racial makeup of the city was 95.8% White, 1.0% African American, 0.6% Native American, 1.0% from other races, and 1.6% from two or more races. Hispanic or Latino of any race were 1.7% of the population.

There were 297 households, of which 26.6% had children under the age of 18 living with them, 49.8% were married couples living together, 5.4% had a female householder with no husband present, 4.4% had a male householder with no wife present, and 40.4% were non-families. 36.7% of all households were made up of individuals, and 18.5% had someone living alone who was 65 years of age or older. The average household size was 2.24 and the average family size was 2.93.

The median age in the city was 40.6 years. 22.8% of residents were under the age of 18; 8.4% were between the ages of 18 and 24; 23.5% were from 25 to 44; 25.1% were from 45 to 64; and 19.9% were 65 years of age or older. The gender makeup of the city was 47.7% male and 52.3% female.

== Education ==
The community is served by Jayhawk USD 346 public school district.

Prior to school unification, the Mound City High School mascot was Eagles.
