= Linn County, Kansas =

County in Kansas, United States

- County
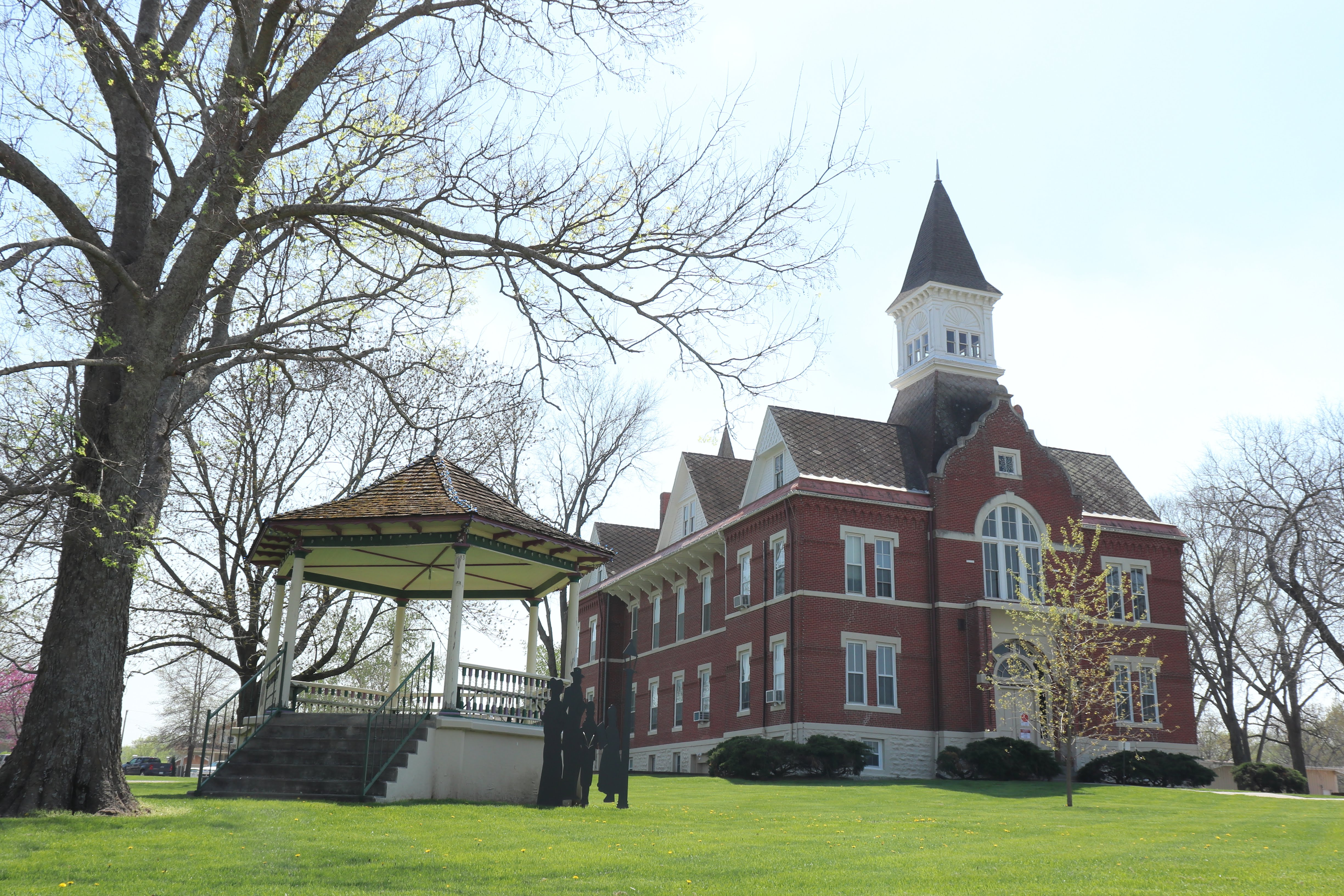
- Linn County Courthouse in Mound City (2020)

- Location within the U.S. state of Kansas
- Coordinates: 38°13′00″N 94°51′00″W
- Country: United States
- State: Kansas
- Founded: February 26, 1867
- Named for: Lewis F. Linn
- Seat: Mound City
- Largest city: Pleasanton

Area
  - Total: 606 sq mi (1,570 km^{2})
  - Land: 594 sq mi (1,540 km^{2})
  - Water: 12 sq mi (31 km^{2}) 2.0%

Population (2020)
  - Total: 9,591
  - Estimate (2025): 9,950 ▲
  - Density: 16.1/sq mi (6.23/km^{2})
- Time zone: UTC−6 (Central)
  - Summer (DST): UTC−5 (CDT)
- Congressional district: 2nd
- Website: www.linncountyks.gov

Linn County is a county in the U.S. state of Kansas, located along the eastern edge of Kansas. Its county seat is Mound City, and its most populous city is Pleasanton. As of the 2020 census, the county population was 9,591. The county was named for Lewis Linn, a U.S. Senator from Missouri.

== History ==
=== Early history ===
For many millennia, the Great Plains of North America was inhabited by nomadic Native Americans. From the 16th century to 18th century, the Kingdom of France claimed ownership of large parts of North America. In 1762, after the French and Indian War, France secretly ceded New France to Spain, per the Treaty of Fontainebleau.

=== 19th century ===
In 1802, Spain returned most of the land to France, but keeping title to about 7,500 square miles. In 1803, most of the land for modern day Kansas was acquired by the United States from France as part of the 828,000 square mile Louisiana Purchase for 2.83 cents per acre.

Explorers in the early 19th century came across abandoned mining sites along a creek south of the Marais des Cygnes river. The background of these early miners remains a mystery; but it inspired early residents of the region to name this waterway "Mine Creek."

== Geography ==
According to the U.S. Census Bureau, the county has a total area of 606 square miles (1,570 km^{2}), of which 594 square miles (1,540 km^{2}) is land and 12 square miles (31 km^{2}) (2.0%) is water.

=== Adjacent counties ===
- Miami County (north)
- Bates County, Missouri (east)
- Vernon County, Missouri (southeast)
- Bourbon County (south)
- Allen County (southwest)
- Anderson County (west)
- Franklin County (northwest)

=== National protected area ===
- Marais des Cygnes National Wildlife Refuge

== Demographics ==
Historical population
Census	Pop.	Note	%±
1860	6,336		—
1870	12,174		92.1%
1880	15,298		25.7%
1890	17,215		12.5%
1900	16,689		−3.1%
1910	14,735		−11.7%
1920	13,815		−6.2%
1930	13,534		−2.0%
1940	11,969		−11.6%
1950	10,053		−16.0%
1960	8,274		−17.7%
1970	7,770		−6.1%
1980	8,234		6.0%
1990	8,254		0.2%
2000	9,570		15.9%
2010	9,656		0.9%
2020	9,591		−0.7%
2025 (est.)	9,950	▲	3.7%
U.S. Decennial Census; 1790-1960 1900-1990; 1990-2000 2010-2020

Linn County is included in the Kansas City, MO-KS Metropolitan Statistical Area.

=== 2020 census ===
As of the 2020 census, the county had a population of 9,591. The median age was 46.2 years. 22.7% of residents were under the age of 18 and 21.8% of residents were 65 years of age or older. For every 100 females there were 104.3 males, and for every 100 females age 18 and over there were 103.7 males age 18 and over. 0.0% of residents lived in urban areas, while 100.0% lived in rural areas.

The racial makeup of the county was 92.9% White, 0.7% Black or African American, 0.5% American Indian and Alaska Native, 0.2% Asian, 0.1% Native Hawaiian and Pacific Islander, 0.5% from some other race, and 5.2% from two or more races. Hispanic or Latino residents of any race comprised 2.5% of the population.

There were 3,982 households in the county, of which 26.7% had children under the age of 18 living with them and 20.6% had a female householder with no spouse or partner present. About 28.8% of all households were made up of individuals and 14.2% had someone living alone who was 65 years of age or older.

There were 5,065 housing units, of which 21.4% were vacant. Among occupied housing units, 79.6% were owner-occupied and 20.4% were renter-occupied. The homeowner vacancy rate was 2.4% and the rental vacancy rate was 8.0%.

=== 2000 census ===
As of the 2000 census, there were 9,570 people, 3,807 households, and 2,748 families residing in the county. The population density was 16 people per square mile (6.2 people/km^{2}). There were 4,720 housing units at an average density of 8 per square mile (3.1/km^{2}). The racial makeup of the county was 97.50% White, 0.63% Black or African American, 0.48% Native American, 0.14% Asian, 0.04% Pacific Islander, 0.16% from other races, and 1.06% from two or more races. Hispanic or Latino of any race were 0.91% of the population.

There were 3,807 households, out of which 28.90% had children under the age of 18 living with them, 62.70% were married couples living together, 6.20% had a female householder with no husband present, and 27.80% were non-families. 24.00% of all households were made up of individuals, and 13.00% had someone living alone who was 65 years of age or older. The average household size was 2.48 and the average family size was 2.94.

In the county, the population was spread out, with 25.00% under the age of 18, 6.70% from 18 to 24, 24.30% from 25 to 44, 25.70% from 45 to 64, and 18.30% who were 65 years of age or older. The median age was 41 years. For every 100 females there were 100.00 males. For every 100 females age 18 and over, there were 97.60 males.

The median income for a household in the county was $35,906, and the median income for a family was $42,571. Males had a median income of $31,720 versus $22,287 for females. The per capita income for the county was $17,009. About 7.80% of families and 11.00% of the population were below the poverty line, including 14.20% of those under age 18 and 9.60% of those age 65 or over.

== Government ==
=== Presidential elections ===
Presidential election results

United States presidential election results for Linn County, Kansas
Year	Republican		Democratic		Third party(ies)	
Year	No.	%	No.	%	No.	%
1888	2,166	52.51%	802	19.44%	1,157	28.05%
1892	2,046	49.37%	0	0.00%	2,098	50.63%
1896	2,153	46.64%	2,424	52.51%	39	0.84%
1900	2,279	52.23%	2,043	46.83%	41	0.94%
1904	2,324	62.54%	1,085	29.20%	307	8.26%
1908	1,950	51.79%	1,657	44.01%	158	4.20%
1912	858	23.95%	1,283	35.82%	1,441	40.23%
1916	2,699	45.47%	2,930	49.36%	307	5.17%
1920	3,189	62.84%	1,764	34.76%	122	2.40%
1924	3,161	57.91%	1,683	30.84%	614	11.25%
1928	4,231	75.19%	1,328	23.60%	68	1.21%
1932	2,647	44.46%	3,216	54.02%	90	1.51%
1936	3,872	58.78%	2,682	40.72%	33	0.50%
1940	4,086	66.04%	2,067	33.41%	34	0.55%
1944	3,185	68.54%	1,442	31.03%	20	0.43%
1948	2,632	60.45%	1,673	38.42%	49	1.13%
1952	3,527	73.99%	1,220	25.59%	20	0.42%
1956	2,991	71.64%	1,177	28.19%	7	0.17%
1960	2,824	70.18%	1,176	29.22%	24	0.60%
1964	1,939	52.70%	1,725	46.89%	15	0.41%
1968	2,250	63.11%	893	25.05%	422	11.84%
1972	2,593	73.41%	876	24.80%	63	1.78%
1976	1,873	52.00%	1,681	46.67%	48	1.33%
1980	2,407	64.88%	1,157	31.19%	146	3.94%
1984	2,795	70.33%	1,152	28.99%	27	0.68%
1988	2,163	58.60%	1,497	40.56%	31	0.84%
1992	1,413	34.20%	1,353	32.75%	1,365	33.04%
1996	2,077	49.04%	1,590	37.54%	568	13.41%
2000	2,513	59.00%	1,587	37.26%	159	3.73%
2004	3,048	64.29%	1,631	34.40%	62	1.31%
2008	3,086	66.84%	1,425	30.86%	106	2.30%
2012	3,177	71.12%	1,170	26.19%	120	2.69%
2016	3,484	78.70%	736	16.63%	207	4.68%
2020	4,048	80.22%	896	17.76%	102	2.02%
2024	4,093	81.60%	854	17.03%	69	1.38%

=== Laws ===
Following amendment to the Kansas Constitution in 1986, the county remained a prohibition, or "dry", county until 2004, when voters approved the sale of alcoholic liquor by the individual drink with a 30 percent food sales requirement.

== Education ==
=== Unified school districts ===
- Pleasanton USD 344
- Jayhawk USD 346
- Prairie View USD 362

== Communities ==
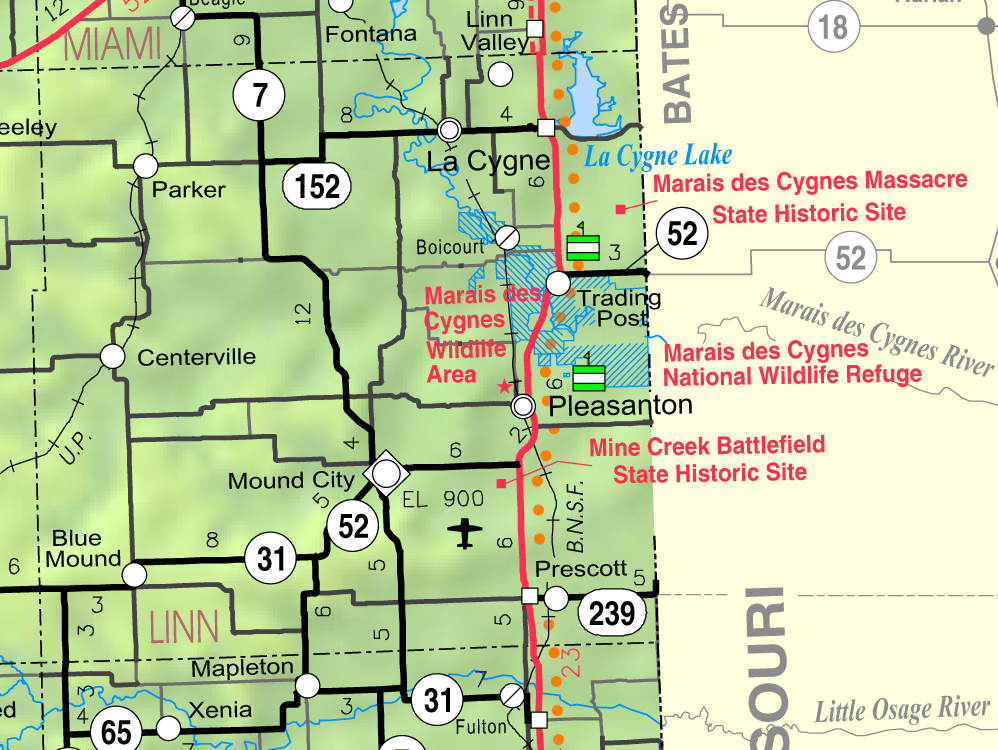
2005 map of Linn County (map legend)

List of townships / incorporated cities / unincorporated communities / extinct former communities within Linn County.

=== Cities ===
- Blue Mound
- La Cygne
- Linn Valley
- Mound City (county seat)
- Parker
- Pleasanton
- Prescott

=== Unincorporated communities ===
† means a community is designated a Census-Designated Place (CDP) by the United States Census Bureau.

- Boicourt
- Cadmus
- Centerville†
- Critzer
- Farlinville
- Goodrich
- Mantey
- Trading Post

=== Ghost towns ===
- Hail Ridge
- Keokuk
- Linnville
- Moneka
- Paris

=== Townships ===
Linn County is divided into eleven townships. None of the cities within the county are considered governmentally independent, and all figures for the townships include those of the cities. In the following table, the population center is the largest city (or cities) included in that township's population total, if it is of a significant size.

Township	FIPS	Population center	Population	Population density /km^{2} (/sq mi)	Land area km^{2} (sq mi)	Water area km^{2} (sq mi)	Water %	Geographic coordinates
Blue Mound	07625		500	3 (8)	162 (63)	0 (0)	0.09%	38°5′37″N 95°0′45″W
Centerville	12350		389	2 (5)	206 (79)	0 (0)	0.07%	38°12′39″N 94°59′56″W
Liberty	40200		908	5 (14)	166 (64)	0 (0)	0.17%	38°19′38″N 94°59′26″W
Lincoln	40825		2,251	18 (47)	125 (48)	11 (4)	7.84%	38°21′10″N 94°43′10″W
Mound City	48775		1,421	11 (29)	129 (50)	0 (0)	0.16%	38°7′59″N 94°48′59″W
Paris	54375		494	3 (8)	167 (65)	0 (0)	0.11%	38°13′49″N 94°50′1″W
Potosi	57175		2,080	14 (37)	144 (56)	1 (0)	0.52%	38°10′35″N 94°42′20″W
Scott	63550		641	4 (10)	163 (63)	1 (0)	0.73%	38°18′32″N 94°51′13″W
Sheridan	64700		560	5 (13)	116 (45)	0 (0)	0.19%	38°4′7″N 94°41′9″W
Stanton	67875		169	2 (6)	78 (30)	0 (0)	0.04%	38°3′33″N 94°49′58″W
Valley	72925		157	2 (4)	94 (36)	6 (2)	5.91%	38°16′7″N 94°41′41″W

== See also ==
- National Register of Historic Places listings in Linn County, Kansas
- USS Linn County (LST-900)

Community information for Kansas

- Kansas locations by per capita income
- List of counties in Kansas
- List of townships in Kansas
- List of cities in Kansas
- List of unincorporated communities in Kansas
- List of ghost towns in Kansas
