= Area code 913 =

Area code for northeastern Kansas, United States

Coordinates: 39.000°N 94.800°W

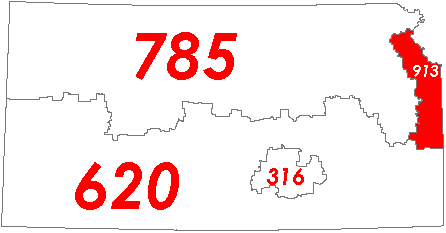
Map of Kansas with area code 913 in Red

Area code 913 is the telephone area code in the North American Numbering Plan for northeastern Kansas. The numbering plan area (NPA) consists of a small ribbon of eight counties bordering Missouri, an area largely coextensive with the Kansas portion of the Kansas City Metropolitan Area.

Prior to July 20, 1997, numbering plan area 913 comprised all of northern Kansas from the Colorado state line to the Missouri state line, running along the entire border with Nebraska.

== History ==
Despite a small population of less than two million people, Kansas was divided into two numbering plan areas when the American Telephone and Telegraph Company (AT&T) devised the first nationwide telephone numbering plan in 1947, and assigned the 86 original North American area codes. The state was divided length-wise into a northern and a southern numbering plan area. The southern half, including the largest city of the state, Wichita, as well as Dodge City, Emporia, and Garden City, received area code 316. The northern half, with its largest population center around Kansas City along the Missouri state line, also including Shawnee, Overland Park, Lawrence, Manhattan, and Topeka, became numbering plan area 913.

The north-south split avoided cutting the major toll traffic routes that ran in east-west directions, a primary rule of traffic and implementation cost analysis. The dividing line ran from west to east roughly following a path along Kansas Routes 4 and 96 from the Colorado state line eastward. It dipped along Interstate 135 in McPherson County and continued east to just north of Emporia in Lyon County, and then all the way to the Missouri state line.

== Kansas City's growth necessitates a new code ==
The configuration of two area codes for Kansas remained unchanged for more than forty years. By the mid-1990s, the proliferation of cell phones, the growing population in the Kansas City metropolitan area (most notably Johnson County and Overland Park, as well as deregulation mandated by the Telecommunications Act of 1996, the pool for exchange codes in area code 913 were quickly being exhausted.

Late in 1996, the Kansas Corporation Commission, which oversees telecommunications in the state, requested relief from the North American Numbering Plan Administrator (NANPA) for the exchanges of area code 913 and on February 12, 1997, the NANPA approved a split of the 913 territory. The area from Lawrence westward received the new area code 785, while 913 was reduced to the Kansas City area. 785 began its split on July 20, 1997 and permissive dialing of 913 continued across northern Kansas until October 2, 1998.

Even with the Kansas City area's continued growth in demand for telecommunication services, 913 is nowhere near exhaustion. NANPA projections of 2017 estimated that the Kansas side of the Kansas City area will not exhaust the pool of central office codes until 2045.

== Service area ==
=== Major cities ===
- Kansas City
- Louisburg
- Olathe
- Overland Park
- Shawnee
- Paola
- Lenexa
- Bonner Springs
- De Soto

=== Major cities reassigned from NPA 913 to 785 ===
- Colby
- Goodland
- Hays
- Junction City
- Lawrence
- Manhattan
- Salina
- Topeka

=== Boundaries ===
When the creation of area code 785 split the 913 numbering plan area, it was cut back to Wyandotte, Linn, Miami, Johnson, Leavenworth, and Atchison counties. A sliver of Doniphan County around the city of Elwood, surrounded on three sides by Missouri, stayed in 913 while the rest of Doniphan County switched to area code 785. This is because subscribers in Elwood receive dialtone from the wirecenter in St. Joseph, Missouri, which is part of area code 816, the area code for the Missouri side of the Kansas City area. It would have been too expensive for Southwestern Bell, the main carrier in both Kansas and Missouri, to reroute Elwood's trunk line so it could follow the rest of Doniphan County into 785.

== See also ==
- List of Kansas area codes
- List of North American Numbering Plan area codes

Kansas area codes: 316, 620, 785, 913
	North: 785	
West: 785	913	East: 660, 816/975
	South: 620	
Missouri area codes: 314/557, 417, 573/235, 636, 660, 816/975
