= Brush Creek (South Moreau Creek tributary) =

Stream in Missouri, U.S.

Coordinates: 38°27′13″N 92°26′24″W

Brush Creek is a stream in Cole and Miller counties of the U.S. state of Missouri. It is a tributary of South Moreau Creek.

The stream headwaters arise in northeast Miller County east of Eldon at and it flows northeast passing under US Route 54 between the communities of Mount Pleasant and Etterville. The stream flows into western Cole County to its confluence with the South Moreau one mile west of Decatur at .

Brush Creek was so named due to the abundance of woody brush along its course.

== See also ==
- List of rivers of Missouri
