= Saline Township, Miller County, Missouri =

Township in Miller County, Missouri, U.S.

Coordinates: 38°22′14″N 92°30′47″W

Saline Township is an inactive township in Miller County, in the U.S. state of Missouri.

Saline Township took its name from Saline Creek. This township contains the Geographic center of Missouri just southeast of the unincorporated community of Etterville.
