= Capps, Missouri =

Unincorporated community in the US state of Missouri

Coordinates: 38°14′32″N 92°19′16″W

Capps is an unincorporated community in northern Miller County, in the U.S. state of Missouri.

The community is on the south bank of the Osage River at the confluence of Humphrey Creek with the Osage. The community is on Missouri Route 52 between Tuscumbia to the west and St. Elizabeth to the east.

== History ==
A post office called Capps was established in 1892, and remained in operation until 1911. The community has the name of Jacob Capps, the proprietor of a local ferry.
