= Atwell, Missouri =

Unincorporated community in Missouri, U.S.

Coordinates: 38°02′18″N 92°12′46″W

Atwell is an unincorporated community in the southeast corner of Miller County, in the U.S. state of Missouri. The community is on a low ridge between Atwell Creek to the east and Little Tavern Creek to the west. Access is by Missouri Route K from Missouri Route 17. Iberia is 5.5 miles to the northwest.

== History ==
A post office called Atwell was established in 1894, and remained in operation until 1910. The community has the name of John T. Atwell, the original owner of the site.
