= Ulman, Missouri =

Unincorporated community in Missouri, U.S.

Coordinates: 38°09′11″N 92°26′39″W

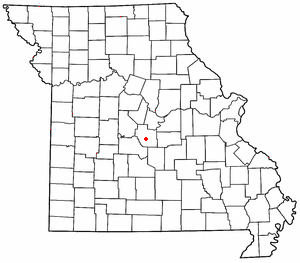

Ulman is an unincorporated community in southern Miller County, Missouri, United States. It is located on Missouri Route C, approximately three miles southwest of Missouri Route 17 and about five miles south of Tuscumbia and the Osage River.

The community bears the name of Joseph Ulman, a first settler. An early variant name was "Ulman's Ridge". A post office called Ulman's Ridge was established in 1857, and the name was changed to Ulman in 1895.
