= Spring Garden, Missouri =

Unincorporated community in Missouri, U.S.

Coordinates: 38°23′07″N 92°25′22″W

Spring Garden is an unincorporated community in northeastern Miller County, in the U.S. state of Missouri. The community lies just north of Missouri Route 54, approximately 8.5 miles northeast of Eldon.

== History ==
A post office called Spring Garden was established in 1882, and remained in operation until 1918. The community's name is a transfer from a place of the same name in Virginia.
