= Pleasant Mount =

Pleasant Mount may refer to:

- Pleasant Mount, Missouri
- Pleasant Mount, Pennsylvania
