= Rocky Mount, Miller County, Missouri =

Unincorporated community in Missouri, U.S.

Coordinates: 38°19′27″N 92°39′55″W

Rocky Mount is an unincorporated community in western Miller County, Missouri United States. The site is on Missouri Route Y approximately four miles southwest of Eldon. The Rocky Mount church is located at this location, however the post office was moved into neighboring Morgan County about two miles to the southwest in 1919. The Rocky Mount Lookout Tower and Rocky Mount Towersite State Wildlife Area lie approximately two miles to the east.

== History ==
Rocky Mount was founded in the 1840s, and named for drainage divide near the original town site. A post office called Rocky Mount was established in 1839, and remained in operation until 1919.
