= West Aurora, Missouri =

Unincorporated community in Missouri, U.S.

Coordinates: 38°18′52″N 92°35′45″W

West Aurora is an unincorporated community in Miller County, in the U.S. state of Missouri.

West Aurora was platted in 1882, and named for its location west of nearby Aurora Springs.
