= Faith, Missouri =

Unincorporated community in Missouri, U.S.

Coordinates: 38°03′16″N 92°23′52″W

Faith is an unincorporated community in southern Miller County, in the U.S. state of Missouri. It is located approximately six miles southwest of Iberia near the headwaters of Barren Fork.

== History ==
A general store, trading post, mill, blacksmith, school and church were established just after the American Civil War by James Milton Wall and his wife Mildred James. They named the community Faith, which later grew into a town. Wall, called "Black Jim" because of his dark features, left Montgomery, Virginia to "go west".

A post office called Faith was established in 1900, and remained in operation until 1907.
