= Saline Creek (Osage River tributary) =

Stream in the US state of Missouri

Saline Creek is a stream in northern Miller County in the U.S. state of Missouri. It is a tributary of the Osage River.

The stream headwaters arise just southwest of Eldon (at 38°19′28″N 92°36′11″W). The stream flows east-southeast passing under Missouri Route 52 and U.S. Route 54. The stream parallels Missouri Route M as it enters the Saline Valley Conservation Area. The stream remains within the conservation area for about six miles and crosses under Missouri Route 17 just prior to its confluence with the Osage (at 38°16′19″N 92°24′47″W) about three miles northeast (downstream) of Tuscumbia. The confluence is adjacent to Coon Creek Island within the Osage and across the Osage from the confluence of Coon Creek to the south.

Saline Creek most likely was so named on account of mineral licks near its course.

== See also ==
- List of rivers of Missouri
