= Aurora Springs, Missouri =

Unincorporated community in Missouri, U.S.

- Census-designated place
- Interactive map of Aurora Springs, Missouri
- Coordinates: 38°19′28″N 92°34′56″W
- Country: United States
- State: Missouri
- County: Miller

Area
  - Total: 0.43 sq mi (1.11 km^{2})
  - Land: 0.43 sq mi (1.11 km^{2})
  - Water: 0 sq mi (0.00 km^{2})
- Elevation: 909 ft (277 m)

Population (2020)
  - Total: 138
  - Density: 321.0/sq mi (123.95/km^{2})
- ZIP Code: 65026 (Eldon)
- FIPS code: 29-02584
- GNIS feature ID: 2804674

Aurora Springs is an unincorporated community and census-designated place (CDP) in northern Miller County, in the U.S. state of Missouri. The community is located on Saline Creek, just south of Eldon and west of U.S. Route 54. As of the 2020 census, its population was 138.

== History ==
Aurora Springs was platted in 1880 and named for a mineral spring near the original town site. A post office called Aurora Springs was established in 1882 and remained in operation until 1912.

== Demographics ==
Historical population
Census	Pop.	Note	%±
1900	900		—
1910	135		−85.0%
1920	116		−14.1%
2020	138		—
U.S. Decennial Census

Aurora Springs was incorporated during the 1900, 1910, and 1920 US census. There was a precipitous decline in population at the beginning of the 20th century. For the 2020 U.S. census, Aurora Springs was listed as a census designated place.
