= Hoecker, Missouri =

Unincorporated community in the US state of Missouri

Coordinates: 38°19′55″N 92°17′26″W

Hoecker is an unincorporated community in northeast Miller County, in the U.S. state of Missouri. The community is on a meander of the Osage River just south of the Miller-Cole county line. Henley is two miles to the west-northwest in Cole County and Meta is six miles to the east in Osage County.

== History ==
A post office called Hoecker was established in 1904, and remained in operation until 1921. James Hoecker, an early postmaster, gave the community his last name.
