= Don Woody =

American rockabilly drummer and comedian (born 1937)

Don Woody (born June 29, 1937) is an American rockabilly drummer and comedian. Woody recorded six sides in the late 1950s with his song "Barking Up the Wrong Tree" receiving the largest amount of commercial success after being reissued 20 years following its initial distribution.

== Biography ==
Woody was born in the small town of Tuscumbia, Missouri. He started a career as a disc jockey in junior high school, and had a comedy routine Woody performed at local clubs. Also during this time, Woody became an accomplished drummer in his high school band. After graduation, he attended Southwest Missouri State University where he took a position as a DJ for the campus's "Top 40" rock and roll radio station. While enrolled in college, Woody wrote a dozen songs with Paul Simmons which the two demoed. All the while, a producer for the television program Ozark Jubilee caught Woody's comedy routine at a night club, and invited him to present the warm-up session for the show. As a result of the show, Woody met Gary Walker, who became his manager, and showcased his demos to Decca Records. One song, "Bigelow 6-200", was recorded by Brenda Lee on September 16, 1956 for the B-side to her debut single.

Record producer Paul Bradley enticed Woody to record his own sides at the Bradley Film and Recording Studio in Nashville, with session musician Grady Martin and the Slewfoot Five. He recorded four songs for Decca, but only "Bird Dog" and "Barking Up the Wrong Tree" were released in 1957 on a single. The release sold moderately well however Decca did not renew their recording contract with Woody, which left the other two songs unissued. With Walker producing, Woody established the independent record label, Arco Records, in Wilkes-Barre, Pennsylvania to release a followup in 1958. However, the label was too small to effectively promote the single and was a commercial failure.

In 1961, Woody retired from the music industry, taking a job in retail management to financially support his wife and child. On April 9, 1976, MCA Records reissued "Barking Up the Wrong Tree" backed by "Peanuts" Wilson's "Cast Iron Arm". It received extensive airplay in the UK, especially on Capital Radio, and bubbled under the UK Singles Chart. Also in that year, the English band Matchbox covered Woody's unreleased track "Make Like Rock 'N' Roll" on their debut album Riders in the Sky. Woody's Decca recordings have been compiled on the compilation albums That'll Flat Git It! (volume two and six) as well as some European compilations. His Arco songs were released on the Eagles Records release The Chicken Are Rockin', Volume 2.

In 2007 Woody returned to the stage for the first time in 45 years as a headliner at the "Viva Las Vegas" rockabilly festival in Las Vegas, Nevada. He has since then performed on several other occasions at that venue and at rockabilly festivals in Europe.
