= 1932 United States presidential election in Missouri =

- November 8, 1932

Nominee	Franklin D. Roosevelt	Herbert Hoover
Party	Democratic	Republican
Home state	New York	California
Running mate	John Nance Garner	Charles Curtis
Electoral vote	15	0
Popular vote	1,025,406	564,713
Percentage	63.69%	35.08%
County results
Roosevelt
50–60%
60–70%
70–80%
80–90%
Hoover
50–60%
60–70%
President before election
Herbert Hoover
Republican
Elected President
Franklin D. Roosevelt
Democratic

The 1932 United States presidential election in Missouri took place on November 8, 1932, as part of the 1932 United States presidential election. Voters chose 15 representatives, or electors, to the Electoral College, who voted for president and vice president.

Missouri was won by Governor Franklin D. Roosevelt (D–New York), running with Speaker John Nance Garner, with 63.39 percent of the popular vote, against incumbent President Herbert Hoover (R–California), running with Vice President Charles Curtis, with 35.08 percent of the popular vote.

This is the last election in which Cedar County, Dade County, Miller County, and Wright County have voted for a Democratic presidential nominee, and the only election since the Civil War when Unionist Ozark Camden County, Christian County and Stone County did so.

== Results ==
1932 United States presidential election in Missouri
Party	Candidate	Votes	%
Democratic	Franklin D. Roosevelt	1,025,406	63.69%
Republican	Herbert Hoover (inc.)	564,713	35.08%
Socialist	Norman Thomas	16,374	1.02%
Prohibition	William D. Upshaw	2,429	0.15%
Communist	William Z. Foster	568	0.04%
Socialist Labor	Verne L. Reynolds	404	0.03%
Total votes		1,609,894	100%

=== Results by county ===
1932 United States presidential election in Missouri by county
County	Franklin Roosevelt Democratic		Herbert Hoover Republican		Norman Thomas Socialist		William Upshaw Prohibition		William Z. Foster Communist		Verne L. Reynolds Socialist Labor		Margin		Total votes cast
County	#	%	#	%	#	%	#	%	#	%	#	%	#	%	Total votes cast
Adair	4,623	59.57%	2,991	38.54%	98	1.26%	40	0.52%	6	0.08%	2	0.03%	1,632	21.03%	7,760
Andrew	3,280	53.44%	2,826	46.04%	18	0.29%	14	0.23%	0	0.00%	0	0.00%	454	7.40%	6,138
Atchison	3,617	62.30%	2,155	37.12%	24	0.41%	9	0.16%	1	0.02%	0	0.00%	1,462	25.18%	5,806
Audrain	7,301	70.26%	3,037	29.22%	21	0.22%	31	0.33%	1	0.01%	1	0.01%	4,264	41.03%	10,392
Barry	5,957	56.26%	4,497	42.47%	103	0.97%	29	0.27%	1	0.01%	1	0.01%	1,460	13.79%	10,588
Barton	3,897	63.84%	2,092	34.27%	83	1.36%	31	0.51%	1	0.02%	0	0.00%	1,805	29.57%	6,104
Bates	6,220	64.16%	3,395	35.02%	47	0.48%	28	0.29%	4	0.04%	0	0.00%	2,825	29.14%	9,694
Benton	2,596	55.57%	2,038	43.62%	17	0.36%	21	0.45%	0	0.00%	0	0.00%	558	11.94%	4,672
Bollinger	2,994	55.00%	2,411	44.29%	29	0.53%	10	0.18%	0	0.00%	0	0.00%	583	10.71%	5,444
Boone	11,554	77.13%	3,241	21.64%	150	1.00%	29	0.19%	2	0.01%	3	0.02%	8,313	55.50%	14,979
Buchanan	26,060	63.68%	14,602	35.68%	204	0.50%	41	0.10%	12	0.03%	3	0.01%	11,458	28.00%	40,922
Butler	6,058	58.80%	4,155	40.33%	72	0.70%	11	0.11%	4	0.04%	3	0.03%	1,903	18.47%	10,303
Caldwell	2,949	51.95%	2,688	47.35%	8	0.14%	32	0.56%	0	0.00%	0	0.00%	261	4.60%	5,677
Callaway	7,042	76.78%	2,079	22.67%	31	0.34%	18	0.20%	2	0.02%	0	0.00%	4,963	54.11%	9,172
Camden	1,801	54.36%	1,497	45.19%	9	0.27%	6	0.18%	0	0.00%	0	0.00%	304	9.18%	3,313
Cape Girardeau	8,394	58.67%	5,796	40.51%	83	0.58%	28	0.20%	2	0.01%	4	0.03%	2,598	18.16%	14,307
Carroll	5,072	56.34%	3,894	43.25%	15	0.17%	20	0.22%	1	0.01%	1	0.01%	1,178	13.08%	9,003
Carter	1,522	65.92%	750	32.48%	29	1.26%	5	0.22%	1	0.04%	2	0.09%	772	33.43%	2,309
Cass	5,772	65.24%	3,009	34.01%	36	0.41%	29	0.33%	1	0.01%	0	0.00%	2,763	31.23%	8,847
Cedar	2,834	52.37%	2,515	46.47%	38	0.70%	24	0.44%	1	0.02%	0	0.00%	319	5.89%	5,412
Chariton	5,498	74.63%	1,835	24.91%	11	0.15%	18	0.24%	3	0.04%	2	0.03%	3,663	49.72%	7,367
Christian	2,577	50.98%	2,395	47.38%	65	1.29%	17	0.34%	1	0.02%	0	0.00%	182	3.60%	5,055
Clark	3,072	57.70%	2,223	41.75%	19	0.36%	10	0.19%	0	0.00%	0	0.00%	849	15.95%	5,324
Clay	9,398	74.52%	3,117	24.71%	52	0.41%	39	0.31%	2	0.02%	4	0.03%	6,281	49.80%	12,612
Clinton	4,042	68.89%	1,805	30.77%	10	0.17%	8	0.14%	1	0.02%	1	0.02%	2,237	38.13%	5,867
Cole	9,068	61.56%	5,636	38.26%	25	0.17%	2	0.01%	0	0.00%	0	0.00%	3,432	23.30%	14,731
Cooper	5,493	59.54%	3,695	40.05%	19	0.21%	18	0.20%	1	0.01%	0	0.00%	1,798	19.49%	9,226
Crawford	3,166	58.36%	2,213	40.79%	40	0.74%	3	0.06%	3	0.06%	0	0.00%	953	17.57%	5,425
Dade	2,833	54.19%	2,340	44.76%	26	0.50%	29	0.55%	0	0.00%	0	0.00%	493	9.43%	5,228
Dallas	2,143	51.81%	1,958	47.34%	18	0.44%	12	0.29%	5	0.12%	0	0.00%	185	4.47%	4,136
Daviess	3,523	59.65%	2,351	39.81%	10	0.17%	21	0.36%	1	0.02%	0	0.00%	1,172	19.84%	5,906
DeKalb	2,519	58.75%	1,747	40.74%	5	0.12%	17	0.40%	0	0.00%	0	0.00%	772	18.00%	4,288
Dent	3,293	65.64%	1,701	33.90%	23	0.46%	0	0.00%	0	0.00%	0	0.00%	1,592	31.73%	5,017
Douglas	1,922	43.53%	2,362	53.50%	114	2.58%	14	0.32%	2	0.05%	1	0.02%	-440	-9.97%	4,415
Dunklin	9,141	81.54%	1,977	17.63%	69	0.62%	20	0.18%	4	0.04%	0	0.00%	7,164	63.90%	11,211
Franklin	8,479	60.60%	5,369	38.37%	129	0.92%	11	0.08%	2	0.01%	2	0.01%	3,110	22.23%	13,992
Gasconade	1,998	43.34%	2,571	55.77%	38	0.82%	2	0.04%	1	0.02%	0	0.00%	-573	-12.43%	4,610
Gentry	3,677	66.10%	1,877	33.74%	9	0.16%	0	0.00%	0	0.00%	0	0.00%	1,800	32.36%	5,563
Greene	18,255	55.67%	13,943	42.52%	487	1.49%	104	0.32%	5	0.02%	0	0.00%	4,312	13.15%	32,794
Grundy	4,006	57.07%	2,953	42.07%	37	0.53%	21	0.30%	3	0.04%	0	0.00%	1,053	15.00%	7,020
Harrison	3,376	57.39%	2,476	42.09%	15	0.25%	15	0.25%	1	0.02%	0	0.00%	900	15.30%	5,883
Henry	6,809	64.85%	3,631	34.58%	29	0.28%	31	0.30%	0	0.00%	0	0.00%	3,178	30.27%	10,500
Hickory	878	35.42%	1,586	63.98%	10	0.40%	5	0.20%	0	0.00%	0	0.00%	-708	-28.56%	2,479
Holt	3,117	57.79%	2,253	41.77%	10	0.19%	14	0.26%	0	0.00%	0	0.00%	864	16.02%	5,394
Howard	5,354	79.47%	1,337	19.85%	27	0.40%	19	0.28%	0	0.00%	0	0.00%	4,017	59.63%	6,737
Howell	4,775	55.91%	3,660	42.86%	68	0.80%	34	0.40%	2	0.02%	1	0.01%	1,115	13.06%	8,540
Iron	2,689	64.45%	1,439	34.49%	35	0.80%	6	0.14%	2	0.05%	1	0.02%	1,250	29.96%	4,172
Jackson	172,456	67.13%	83,214	32.39%	944	0.37%	188	0.07%	43	0.02%	40	0.02%	89,242	34.74%	256,885
Jasper	17,349	58.60%	11,788	39.82%	348	1.18%	104	0.35%	11	0.04%	4	0.01%	5,561	18.78%	29,604
Jefferson	8,130	63.30%	4,559	35.50%	136	1.06%	15	0.12%	4	0.03%	0	0.00%	3,571	27.80%	12,844
Johnson	6,481	60.88%	4,088	38.40%	38	0.36%	30	0.28%	2	0.02%	6	0.06%	2,393	22.48%	10,645
Knox	3,045	66.75%	1,465	32.11%	28	0.61%	22	0.48%	2	0.04%	0	0.00%	1,580	34.63%	4,562
Laclede	3,960	58.04%	2,804	41.10%	42	0.62%	17	0.25%	0	0.00%	0	0.00%	1,156	16.94%	6,823
Lafayette	7,906	58.08%	5,670	41.65%	18	0.13%	13	0.10%	2	0.01%	4	0.03%	2,236	16.43%	13,613
Lawrence	6,411	59.74%	4,146	38.63%	117	1.09%	56	0.52%	2	0.02%	0	0.00%	2,265	21.11%	10,732
Lewis	3,746	72.84%	1,341	26.07%	38	0.74%	17	0.33%	1	0.02%	0	0.00%	2,405	46.76%	5,143
Lincoln	4,428	73.06%	1,604	26.46%	18	0.30%	9	0.15%	2	0.03%	0	0.00%	2,824	46.59%	6,061
Linn	6,177	62.66%	3,611	36.63%	47	0.48%	22	0.22%	1	0.01%	0	0.00%	2,566	26.03%	9,858
Livingston	4,742	56.24%	3,659	43.40%	17	0.20%	12	0.14%	1	0.01%	0	0.00%	1,083	12.85%	8,431
Macon	6,370	65.55%	3,266	33.61%	60	0.62%	19	0.20%	1	0.01%	2	0.02%	3,104	31.94%	9,718
Madison	2,347	61.96%	1,428	37.70%	7	0.18%	5	0.13%	1	0.03%	0	0.00%	919	24.26%	3,788
Maries	2,758	78.33%	745	21.16%	11	0.31%	7	0.20%	0	0.00%	0	0.00%	2,013	57.17%	3,521
Marion	10,293	70.89%	4,123	28.40%	84	0.58%	18	0.12%	1	0.01%	0	0.00%	6,170	42.50%	14,519
McDonald	3,943	60.99%	2,464	38.11%	45	0.70%	10	0.15%	1	0.02%	2	0.03%	1,479	22.88%	6,465
Mercer	1,520	52.40%	1,357	46.78%	6	0.21%	18	0.62%	0	0.00%	0	0.00%	163	5.62%	2,901
Miller	3,776	58.68%	2,615	40.64%	30	0.47%	13	0.20%	1	0.02%	0	0.00%	1,161	18.04%	6,435
Mississippi	3,136	64.55%	1,687	34.73%	20	0.41%	14	0.29%	1	0.02%	0	0.00%	1,449	29.83%	4,858
Moniteau	3,767	61.61%	2,331	38.13%	5	0.08%	9	0.15%	1	0.02%	1	0.02%	1,436	23.49%	6,114
Monroe	6,210	89.12%	714	10.25%	24	0.34%	18	0.26%	2	0.03%	0	0.00%	5,496	78.87%	6,968
Montgomery	3,600	57.68%	2,607	41.77%	23	0.37%	9	0.14%	2	0.03%	0	0.00%	993	15.91%	6,241
Morgan	2,768	57.58%	2,000	41.61%	32	0.67%	7	0.15%	0	0.00%	0	0.00%	768	15.98%	4,807
New Madrid	7,837	67.26%	3,768	32.34%	42	0.36%	4	0.03%	1	0.01%	0	0.00%	4,069	34.92%	11,652
Newton	7,224	59.17%	4,806	39.36%	109	0.89%	64	0.52%	4	0.03%	2	0.02%	2,418	19.81%	12,209
Nodaway	6,959	65.64%	3,584	33.80%	34	0.32%	24	0.23%	1	0.01%	0	0.00%	3,375	31.83%	10,602
Oregon	3,599	81.37%	786	17.77%	25	0.57%	12	0.27%	1	0.02%	0	0.00%	2,813	63.60%	4,423
Osage	3,567	66.21%	1,798	33.38%	19	0.35%	3	0.06%	0	0.00%	0	0.00%	1,769	32.84%	5,387
Ozark	1,358	43.72%	1,730	55.70%	11	0.35%	7	0.23%	0	0.00%	0	0.00%	-372	-11.98%	3,106
Pemiscot	7,909	64.01%	4,415	35.73%	15	0.12%	11	0.09%	4	0.03%	2	0.02%	3,494	28.28%	12,356
Perry	3,502	59.19%	2,396	40.49%	14	0.24%	4	0.07%	1	0.02%	0	0.00%	1,106	18.69%	5,917
Pettis	9,474	60.95%	5,982	38.48%	63	0.41%	26	0.17%	0	0.00%	0	0.00%	3,492	22.46%	15,545
Phelps	4,858	72.29%	1,794	26.70%	56	0.83%	11	0.16%	1	0.01%	0	0.00%	3,064	45.60%	6,720
Pike	5,783	69.02%	2,462	29.38%	86	1.03%	44	0.53%	2	0.02%	2	0.02%	3,321	39.63%	8,379
Platte	5,179	81.46%	1,160	18.24%	13	0.20%	6	0.09%	0	0.00%	0	0.00%	4,019	63.21%	6,358
Polk	4,355	53.03%	3,811	46.40%	13	0.16%	33	0.40%	1	0.01%	0	0.00%	544	6.62%	8,213
Pulaski	3,260	68.40%	1,489	31.24%	17	0.36%	0	0.00%	0	0.00%	0	0.00%	1,771	37.16%	4,766
Putnam	1,987	46.05%	2,180	50.52%	130	3.01%	15	0.35%	1	0.02%	2	0.05%	-193	-4.47%	4,315
Ralls	3,526	81.87%	761	17.67%	13	0.30%	7	0.16%	0	0.00%	0	0.00%	2,765	64.20%	4,307
Randolph	9,294	77.87%	2,575	21.58%	34	0.28%	26	0.22%	6	0.05%	0	0.00%	6,719	56.30%	11,935
Ray	6,088	77.59%	1,706	21.74%	33	0.42%	17	0.22%	2	0.03%	0	0.00%	4,382	55.85%	7,846
Reynolds	2,439	75.00%	792	24.35%	18	0.55%	3	0.09%	0	0.00%	0	0.00%	1,647	50.65%	3,252
Ripley	2,600	67.81%	1,139	29.71%	69	1.80%	24	0.63%	2	0.05%	0	0.00%	1,461	38.11%	3,834
Saint Charles	6,911	64.37%	3,664	34.12%	153	1.42%	2	0.02%	4	0.04%	3	0.03%	3,247	30.24%	10,737
Saint Clair	3,681	61.13%	2,271	37.71%	46	0.76%	17	0.28%	7	0.12%	0	0.00%	1,410	23.41%	6,022
Saint Francois	7,613	55.15%	6,017	43.59%	136	0.99%	31	0.22%	3	0.02%	4	0.03%	1,596	11.56%	13,804
Saint Louis County	59,044	60.09%	35,872	36.51%	3,237	3.29%	30	0.03%	26	0.03%	48	0.05%	23,172	23.58%	98,257
Saint Louis City	226,338	63.38%	123,448	34.57%	6,658	1.86%	127	0.04%	362	0.10%	172	0.05%	102,890	28.81%	357,105
Sainte Genevieve	3,087	73.24%	1,109	26.31%	16	0.38%	3	0.07%	0	0.00%	0	0.00%	1,978	46.93%	4,215
Saline	8,389	68.51%	3,783	30.89%	44	0.36%	26	0.21%	2	0.02%	1	0.01%	4,606	37.62%	12,245
Schuyler	2,239	66.40%	1,109	32.89%	8	0.24%	16	0.47%	0	0.00%	0	0.00%	1,130	33.51%	3,372
Scotland	2,738	65.11%	1,410	33.53%	37	0.88%	19	0.45%	1	0.02%	0	0.00%	1,328	31.58%	4,205
Scott	6,948	74.45%	2,310	24.75%	49	0.53%	17	0.18%	3	0.03%	6	0.06%	4,638	49.69%	9,333
Shannon	2,949	75.15%	879	22.40%	83	2.12%	9	0.23%	3	0.08%	1	0.03%	2,070	52.75%	3,924
Shelby	4,215	78.87%	1,104	20.66%	16	0.30%	9	0.17%	0	0.00%	0	0.00%	3,111	58.21%	5,344
Stoddard	7,139	68.09%	3,234	30.84%	87	0.83%	21	0.20%	4	0.04%	0	0.00%	3,905	37.24%	10,485
Stone	1,911	51.82%	1,748	47.40%	26	0.70%	2	0.05%	1	0.03%	0	0.00%	163	4.42%	3,688
Sullivan	4,053	54.38%	3,373	45.26%	13	0.17%	12	0.16%	2	0.03%	0	0.00%	680	9.12%	7,453
Taney	1,911	47.93%	2,045	51.29%	18	0.45%	9	0.23%	4	0.10%	0	0.00%	-134	-3.36%	3,987
Texas	4,996	65.09%	2,621	34.15%	51	0.66%	7	0.09%	0	0.00%	0	0.00%	2,375	30.94%	7,675
Vernon	6,687	69.07%	2,856	29.50%	71	0.73%	59	0.61%	8	0.08%	0	0.00%	3,831	39.57%	9,681
Warren	1,513	43.03%	1,974	56.14%	26	0.74%	3	0.09%	0	0.00%	0	0.00%	-461	-13.11%	3,516
Washington	3,275	58.91%	2,246	40.40%	27	0.49%	9	0.16%	2	0.04%	0	0.00%	1,029	18.51%	5,559
Wayne	3,172	61.37%	1,955	37.82%	29	0.56%	12	0.23%	1	0.02%	0	0.00%	1,217	23.54%	5,169
Webster	4,211	57.24%	3,083	41.91%	29	0.39%	28	0.38%	2	0.03%	4	0.05%	1,128	15.33%	7,357
Worth	1,763	62.50%	1,041	36.90%	7	0.25%	10	0.35%	0	0.00%	0	0.00%	722	25.59%	2,821
Wright	3,862	55.58%	3,023	43.51%	40	0.58%	15	0.22%	7	0.10%	1	0.01%	839	12.08%	6,948
Totals	1,025,406	63.69%	564,713	35.08%	16,374	1.02%	2,429	0.15%	568	0.04%	404	0.03%	460,693	28.62%	1,609,894

==== Counties that flipped from Republican to Democratic ====
- Andrew
- Barry
- Benton
- Bollinger
- Butler
- Caldwell
- Camden
- Carroll
- Cedar
- Christian
- Crawford
- Dallas
- Daviess
- DeKalb
- Franklin
- Harrison
- Holt
- Howell
- Laclede
- Lafayette
- Lawrence
- Mercer
- Miller
- Moniteau
- Montgomery
- Morgan
- Perry
- Polk
- St. Clair
- Stone
- Sullivan
- Webster
- Wright
- Adair
- Atchison
- Barton
- Bates
- Cape Girardeau
- Clark
- Daviess
- Henry
- Jasper
- Johnson
- Livingston
- Madison
- McDonald
- Nodaway
- Newton
- Pettis
- St. Charles
- St. Francois
- Ripley
- St. Louis
- Washington
- Texas
- Worth
- Cass
- Cole
- Greene
- Knox
- Macon
- Vernon
- Wayne
- Buchanan
- Carter
- Clay
- Clinton
- Dent
- Gentry
- Iron
- Jackson
- Jefferson
- Linn
- Marion
- New Madrid
- Pemiscot
- Phelps
- Pike
- Pulaski
- Saline
- Schuyler
- Scotland
- Stoddard
- Texas

== See also ==
- United States presidential elections in Missouri
