= 1944 United States presidential election in Missouri =

- November 7, 1944

Nominee	Franklin D. Roosevelt	Thomas E. Dewey
Party	Democratic	Republican
Home state	New York	New York
Running mate	Harry S. Truman	John W. Bricker
Electoral vote	15	0
Popular vote	807,804	761,524
Percentage	51.37%	48.43%
County results
Roosevelt
50–60%
60–70%
70–80%
80–90%
Dewey
40–50%
50–60%
60–70%
70–80%
80–90%
President before election
Franklin D. Roosevelt
Democratic
Elected President
Franklin D. Roosevelt
Democratic

The 1944 United States presidential election in Missouri took place on November 7, 1944, as part of the 1944 United States presidential election. Voters chose 15 representatives, or electors, to the Electoral College, who voted for president and vice president.

Missouri was won by incumbent President Franklin D. Roosevelt (D–New York), running with Senator Harry S. Truman, with 51.37% of the popular vote, against Governor Thomas E. Dewey (R–New York), running with Governor John Bricker, with 48.43% of the popular vote.

Despite winning the state, Roosevelt's victory margin of less than three percentage points was historically poor for a nationally-successful Democrat, and the state weighed in as 4.56% more Republican than the nation at-large.

== Results ==
1944 United States presidential election in Missouri
Party	Candidate	Votes	%
Democratic	Franklin D. Roosevelt (inc.)	807,804	51.37%
Republican	Thomas E. Dewey	761,524	48.43%
Write-ins		3,146	0.20%
Total votes		1,572,474	100%

=== Results by county ===
1944 United States presidential election in Missouri by county
County	Franklin D. Roosevelt Democratic		Thomas E. Dewey Republican		Norman Thomas Socialist		Claude A. Watson Prohibition		Edward A. Teichert Socialist Labor		Margin		Total votes cast
County	#	%	#	%	#	%	#	%	#	%	#	%	Total votes cast
Adair	3,606	42.22%	4,909	57.48%	14	0.16%	12	0.14%	0	0.00%	-1,303	-15.26%	8,541
Andrew	2,254	37.60%	3,734	62.29%	2	0.03%	5	0.08%	0	0.00%	-1,480	-24.69%	5,995
Atchison	2,214	44.09%	2,803	55.83%	3	0.06%	1	0.02%	0	0.00%	-589	-11.73%	5,021
Audrain	6,471	65.11%	3,455	34.76%	3	0.03%	10	0.10%	0	0.00%	3,016	30.35%	9,939
Barry	4,029	40.91%	5,796	58.85%	13	0.13%	8	0.08%	2	0.02%	-1,767	-17.94%	9,848
Barton	2,688	44.31%	3,356	55.32%	13	0.21%	10	0.16%	0	0.00%	-668	-11.01%	6,067
Bates	4,096	44.35%	5,122	55.46%	6	0.06%	11	0.12%	1	0.01%	-1,026	-11.11%	9,236
Benton	1,108	25.14%	3,294	74.73%	1	0.02%	5	0.11%	0	0.00%	-2,186	-49.59%	4,408
Bollinger	1,841	39.22%	2,850	60.72%	1	0.02%	2	0.04%	0	0.00%	-1,009	-21.50%	4,694
Boone	9,704	69.67%	4,195	30.12%	21	0.15%	8	0.06%	1	0.01%	5,509	39.55%	13,929
Buchanan	20,091	57.04%	15,113	42.91%	14	0.04%	5	0.01%	1	0.00%	4,978	14.13%	35,224
Butler	4,219	39.70%	6,375	59.99%	5	0.05%	25	0.24%	2	0.02%	-2,156	-20.29%	10,626
Caldwell	2,001	37.10%	3,384	62.75%	3	0.06%	5	0.09%	0	0.00%	-1,383	-25.64%	5,393
Callaway	5,757	64.51%	3,143	35.22%	6	0.07%	17	0.19%	1	0.01%	2,614	29.29%	8,924
Camden	990	31.18%	2,180	68.66%	2	0.06%	3	0.09%	0	0.00%	-1,190	-37.48%	3,175
Cape Girardeau	6,845	45.05%	8,339	54.88%	4	0.03%	7	0.05%	0	0.00%	-1,494	-9.83%	15,195
Carroll	3,283	38.94%	5,127	60.82%	20	0.24%	0	0.00%	0	0.00%	-1,844	-21.87%	8,430
Carter	1,207	53.60%	1,033	45.87%	8	0.36%	2	0.09%	2	0.09%	174	7.73%	2,252
Cass	4,347	48.08%	4,687	51.84%	2	0.02%	5	0.06%	0	0.00%	-340	-3.76%	9,041
Cedar	1,478	29.22%	3,576	70.69%	2	0.04%	3	0.06%	0	0.00%	-2,098	-41.47%	5,059
Chariton	3,930	50.78%	3,802	49.12%	1	0.01%	7	0.09%	0	0.00%	128	1.65%	7,740
Christian	1,134	21.36%	4,167	78.47%	3	0.06%	6	0.11%	0	0.00%	-3,033	-57.12%	5,310
Clark	2,155	44.27%	2,707	55.61%	4	0.08%	2	0.04%	0	0.00%	-552	-11.34%	4,868
Clay	8,682	56.21%	6,724	43.53%	25	0.16%	13	0.08%	2	0.01%	1,958	12.68%	15,446
Clinton	3,079	51.35%	2,912	48.57%	2	0.03%	1	0.02%	2	0.03%	167	2.79%	5,996
Cole	7,139	49.21%	7,364	50.76%	2	0.01%	1	0.01%	1	0.01%	-225	-1.55%	14,507
Cooper	3,729	42.98%	4,928	56.79%	6	0.07%	13	0.15%	1	0.01%	-1,199	-13.82%	8,677
Crawford	2,177	41.36%	3,077	58.45%	4	0.08%	4	0.08%	2	0.04%	-900	-17.10%	5,264
Dade	1,462	30.55%	3,316	69.29%	3	0.06%	4	0.08%	1	0.02%	-1,854	-38.74%	4,786
Dallas	1,064	24.71%	3,232	75.06%	8	0.19%	2	0.05%	0	0.00%	-2,168	-50.35%	4,306
Daviess	2,567	41.61%	3,597	58.31%	5	0.08%	0	0.00%	0	0.00%	-1,030	-16.70%	6,169
DeKalb	1,961	42.40%	2,658	57.47%	6	0.13%	0	0.00%	0	0.00%	-697	-15.07%	4,625
Dent	2,699	52.29%	2,456	47.58%	3	0.06%	4	0.08%	0	0.00%	243	4.71%	5,162
Douglas	746	17.23%	3,570	82.45%	8	0.18%	6	0.14%	0	0.00%	-2,824	-65.22%	4,330
Dunklin	8,431	66.23%	4,271	33.55%	10	0.08%	17	0.13%	0	0.00%	4,160	32.68%	12,729
Franklin	5,958	38.88%	9,325	60.84%	26	0.17%	16	0.10%	1	0.01%	-3,367	-21.97%	15,326
Gasconade	994	16.53%	5,007	83.27%	4	0.07%	8	0.13%	0	0.00%	-4,013	-66.74%	6,013
Gentry	3,022	50.37%	2,970	49.50%	4	0.07%	4	0.07%	0	0.00%	52	0.87%	6,000
Greene	17,287	44.46%	21,531	55.37%	21	0.05%	44	0.11%	3	0.01%	-4,244	-10.91%	38,886
Grundy	2,997	41.82%	4,158	58.02%	1	0.01%	8	0.11%	3	0.04%	-1,161	-16.20%	7,167
Harrison	2,623	37.67%	4,330	62.18%	7	0.10%	4	0.06%	0	0.00%	-1,707	-24.51%	6,964
Henry	4,587	45.09%	5,564	54.69%	4	0.04%	19	0.19%	0	0.00%	-977	-9.60%	10,174
Hickory	560	20.48%	2,171	79.41%	3	0.11%	0	0.00%	0	0.00%	-1,611	-58.92%	2,734
Holt	1,785	36.09%	3,152	63.73%	1	0.02%	8	0.16%	0	0.00%	-1,367	-27.64%	4,946
Howard	3,958	66.88%	1,951	32.97%	1	0.02%	6	0.10%	2	0.03%	2,007	33.91%	5,918
Howell	3,020	36.90%	5,151	62.93%	4	0.05%	10	0.12%	0	0.00%	-2,131	-26.04%	8,185
Iron	2,205	57.21%	1,649	42.79%	0	0.00%	0	0.00%	0	0.00%	556	14.43%	3,854
Jackson	113,803	54.29%	95,406	45.51%	254	0.12%	136	0.06%	33	0.02%	18,397	8.78%	209,632
Jasper	13,111	43.02%	17,301	56.77%	23	0.08%	27	0.09%	3	0.01%	-4,190	-13.75%	30,475
Jefferson	7,953	53.94%	6,758	45.83%	19	0.13%	14	0.09%	1	0.01%	1,195	8.10%	14,745
Johnson	4,419	42.58%	5,949	57.32%	7	0.07%	2	0.02%	1	0.01%	-1,530	-14.74%	10,378
Knox	1,943	48.48%	2,057	51.32%	5	0.12%	3	0.07%	0	0.00%	-114	-2.84%	4,008
Laclede	3,011	39.17%	4,670	60.75%	4	0.05%	1	0.01%	1	0.01%	-1,659	-21.58%	7,687
Lafayette	5,603	41.32%	7,951	58.63%	4	0.03%	2	0.01%	1	0.01%	-2,348	-17.31%	13,561
Lawrence	3,859	35.99%	6,836	63.76%	8	0.07%	17	0.16%	2	0.02%	-2,977	-27.77%	10,722
Lewis	2,883	59.17%	1,988	40.80%	5	0.10%	6	0.12%	0	0.00%	895	18.37%	4,872
Lincoln	3,773	56.33%	2,910	43.45%	6	0.09%	9	0.13%	0	0.00%	863	12.88%	6,698
Linn	5,242	51.43%	4,942	48.48%	5	0.05%	3	0.03%	1	0.01%	300	2.94%	10,193
Livingston	3,887	45.15%	4,697	54.55%	6	0.07%	20	0.23%	0	0.00%	-810	-9.41%	8,610
Macon	4,772	49.81%	4,796	50.06%	9	0.09%	4	0.04%	0	0.00%	-24	-0.25%	9,581
Madison	2,203	49.09%	2,277	50.74%	4	0.09%	4	0.09%	0	0.00%	-74	-1.65%	4,488
Maries	1,824	54.19%	1,519	45.13%	2	0.06%	21	0.62%	0	0.00%	305	9.06%	3,366
Marion	8,575	65.21%	4,560	34.68%	11	0.08%	3	0.02%	0	0.00%	4,015	30.53%	13,149
McDonald	2,523	41.66%	3,520	58.12%	12	0.20%	1	0.02%	0	0.00%	-997	-16.46%	6,056
Mercer	1,035	31.48%	2,249	68.40%	2	0.06%	2	0.06%	0	0.00%	-1,214	-36.92%	3,288
Miller	2,229	38.10%	3,609	61.69%	2	0.03%	10	0.17%	0	0.00%	-1,380	-23.59%	5,850
Mississippi	4,182	67.97%	1,944	31.59%	12	0.20%	14	0.23%	1	0.02%	2,238	36.37%	6,153
Moniteau	2,327	41.72%	3,237	58.04%	5	0.09%	8	0.14%	0	0.00%	-910	-16.32%	5,577
Monroe	5,000	81.89%	1,098	17.98%	2	0.03%	6	0.10%	0	0.00%	3,902	63.90%	6,106
Montgomery	2,743	43.71%	3,527	56.20%	2	0.03%	2	0.03%	2	0.03%	-784	-12.49%	6,276
Morgan	1,735	37.38%	2,896	62.40%	5	0.11%	4	0.09%	1	0.02%	-1,161	-25.02%	4,641
New Madrid	7,626	64.89%	4,108	34.96%	3	0.03%	11	0.09%	4	0.03%	3,518	29.94%	11,752
Newton	5,146	42.34%	6,985	57.47%	10	0.08%	13	0.11%	0	0.00%	-1,839	-15.13%	12,154
Nodaway	5,407	48.36%	5,766	51.57%	3	0.03%	3	0.03%	1	0.01%	-359	-3.21%	11,180
Oregon	2,734	63.38%	1,573	36.46%	6	0.14%	1	0.02%	0	0.00%	1,161	26.91%	4,314
Osage	2,121	39.19%	3,284	60.68%	5	0.09%	2	0.04%	0	0.00%	-1,163	-21.49%	5,412
Ozark	628	18.81%	2,707	81.10%	3	0.09%	0	0.00%	0	0.00%	-2,079	-62.28%	3,338
Pemiscot	7,380	62.90%	4,333	36.93%	6	0.05%	11	0.09%	3	0.03%	3,047	25.97%	11,733
Perry	2,014	32.35%	4,207	67.57%	1	0.02%	3	0.05%	1	0.02%	-2,193	-35.22%	6,226
Pettis	7,176	48.18%	7,696	51.67%	10	0.07%	10	0.07%	2	0.01%	-520	-3.49%	14,894
Phelps	4,256	57.14%	3,180	42.69%	9	0.12%	1	0.01%	3	0.04%	1,076	14.44%	7,449
Pike	4,659	58.01%	3,351	41.72%	7	0.09%	15	0.19%	0	0.00%	1,308	16.28%	8,032
Platte	3,741	61.40%	2,344	38.47%	7	0.11%	1	0.02%	0	0.00%	1,397	22.93%	6,093
Polk	2,527	33.32%	5,040	66.45%	6	0.08%	11	0.15%	1	0.01%	-2,513	-33.13%	7,585
Pulaski	3,048	56.44%	2,345	43.43%	4	0.07%	3	0.06%	0	0.00%	703	13.02%	5,400
Putnam	1,168	27.28%	3,106	72.55%	4	0.09%	3	0.07%	0	0.00%	-1,938	-45.27%	4,281
Ralls	2,799	70.57%	1,164	29.35%	3	0.08%	0	0.00%	0	0.00%	1,635	41.23%	3,966
Randolph	7,629	72.48%	2,879	27.35%	8	0.08%	9	0.09%	0	0.00%	4,750	45.13%	10,525
Ray	4,521	59.28%	3,094	40.57%	7	0.09%	4	0.05%	1	0.01%	1,427	18.71%	7,627
Reynolds	1,877	66.25%	951	33.57%	5	0.18%	0	0.00%	0	0.00%	926	32.69%	2,833
Ripley	1,923	50.89%	1,841	48.72%	11	0.29%	4	0.11%	0	0.00%	82	2.17%	3,779
Saint Charles	4,880	40.78%	7,050	58.92%	31	0.26%	4	0.03%	1	0.01%	-2,170	-18.13%	11,966
Saint Clair	2,119	39.02%	3,306	60.87%	2	0.04%	4	0.07%	0	0.00%	-1,187	-21.86%	5,431
Saint Francois	6,745	47.92%	7,320	52.00%	4	0.03%	7	0.05%	0	0.00%	-575	-4.08%	14,076
Saint Louis County	57,780	47.26%	64,131	52.45%	271	0.22%	65	0.05%	19	0.02%	-6,351	-5.19%	122,266
Saint Louis City	204,687	60.22%	134,411	39.54%	574	0.17%	152	0.04%	95	0.03%	70,276	20.67%	339,919
Sainte Genevieve	1,878	45.83%	2,214	54.03%	4	0.10%	2	0.05%	0	0.00%	-336	-8.20%	4,098
Saline	6,715	52.65%	6,022	47.22%	4	0.03%	11	0.09%	1	0.01%	693	5.43%	12,753
Schuyler	1,729	52.97%	1,526	46.75%	7	0.21%	2	0.06%	0	0.00%	203	6.22%	3,264
Scotland	2,158	51.11%	2,058	48.74%	3	0.07%	3	0.07%	0	0.00%	100	2.37%	4,222
Scott	7,132	63.86%	3,995	35.77%	7	0.06%	31	0.28%	3	0.03%	3,137	28.09%	11,168
Shannon	2,093	65.12%	1,110	34.54%	9	0.28%	1	0.03%	1	0.03%	983	30.58%	3,214
Shelby	3,435	63.76%	1,934	35.90%	6	0.11%	12	0.22%	0	0.00%	1,501	27.86%	5,387
Stoddard	5,982	53.96%	5,079	45.81%	6	0.05%	18	0.16%	1	0.01%	903	8.15%	11,086
Stone	737	19.30%	3,080	80.67%	1	0.03%	0	0.00%	0	0.00%	-2,343	-61.37%	3,818
Sullivan	2,880	46.85%	3,262	53.07%	3	0.04%	2	0.03%	0	0.00%	-382	-6.21%	6,147
Taney	936	27.18%	2,499	72.56%	5	0.15%	4	0.12%	0	0.00%	-1,563	-45.38%	3,444
Texas	4,011	50.53%	3,916	49.33%	5	0.06%	6	0.08%	0	0.00%	95	1.20%	7,938
Vernon	4,885	48.55%	5,171	51.39%	1	0.01%	4	0.04%	1	0.01%	-286	-2.84%	10,062
Warren	815	21.19%	3,017	78.42%	10	0.26%	4	0.10%	1	0.03%	-2,202	-57.24%	3,847
Washington	2,065	41.52%	2,900	58.30%	5	0.10%	1	0.02%	3	0.06%	-835	-16.79%	4,974
Wayne	2,169	49.87%	2,171	49.92%	4	0.09%	4	0.09%	1	0.02%	-2	-0.05%	4,349
Webster	2,777	39.26%	4,281	60.53%	3	0.04%	11	0.16%	1	0.01%	-1,504	-21.26%	7,073
Worth	1,437	49.88%	1,444	50.12%	0	0.00%	0	0.00%	0	0.00%	-7	-0.24%	2,881
Wright	2,116	32.37%	4,413	67.51%	8	0.12%	0	0.00%	0	0.00%	-2,297	-35.14%	6,537
Totals	807,356	51.37%	761,172	48.43%	1,751	0.11%	1,175	0.07%	220	0.01%	46,184	2.94%	1,571,684

==== Counties that flipped from Democratic to Republican ====
- Cass
- Cole
- Greene
- Knox
- Macon
- Vernon
- Wayne

==== Counties that flipped from Republican to Democratic ====
- Texas

== See also ==
- United States presidential elections in Missouri
