= Keethtown, Missouri =

Unincorporated community in Missouri, U.S.

Coordinates: 38°02′35″N 92°25′27″W

Keethtown is an unincorporated community in southern Miller County, in the U.S. state of Missouri. The community is on Missouri Route U, approximately four miles southeast of Brumley and 1.5 miles north of the Miller-Camden county line.

The community derives its name from William Keeth, a local merchant.
