= 1912 United States presidential election in Missouri =

- November 5, 1912

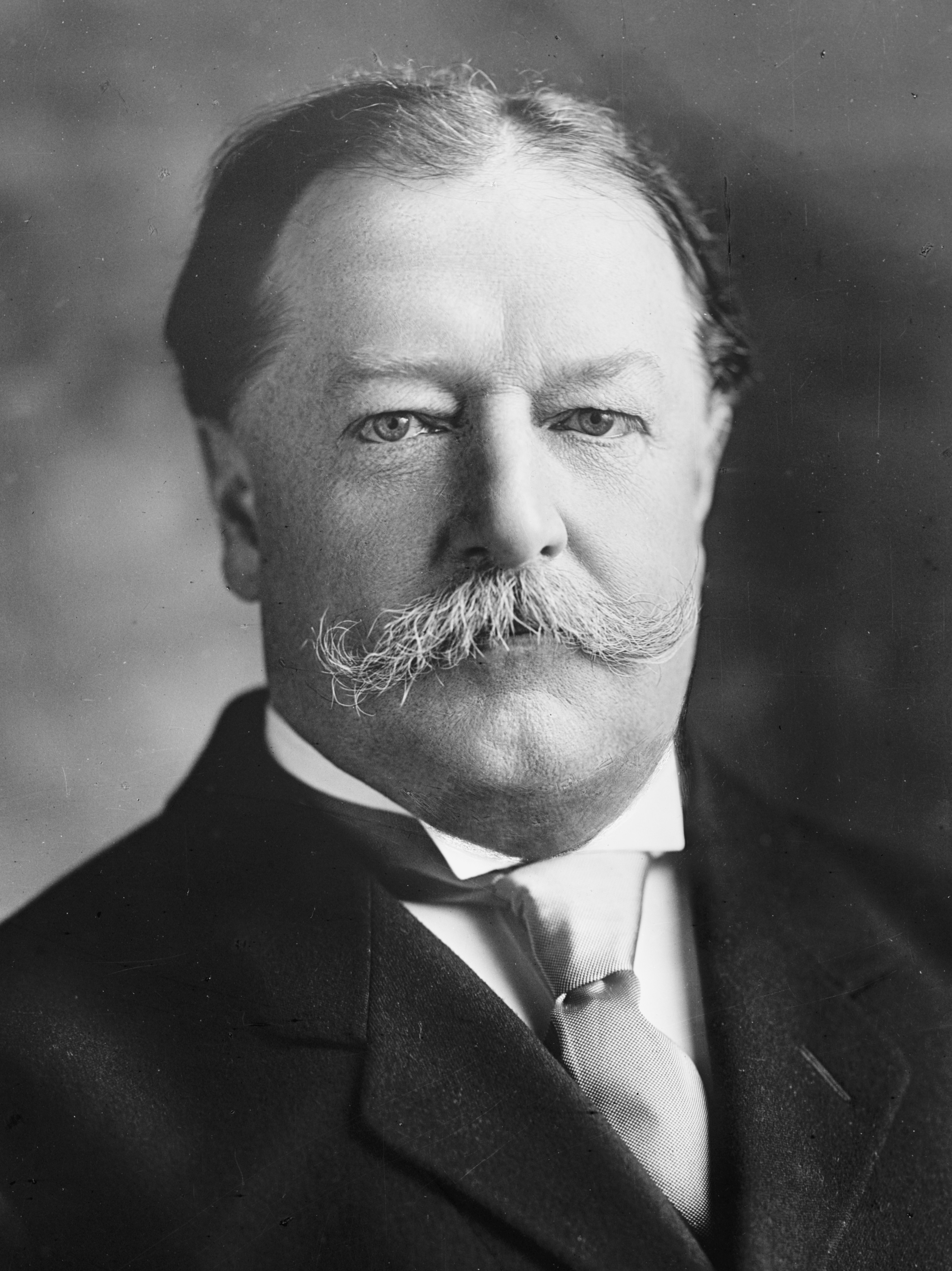

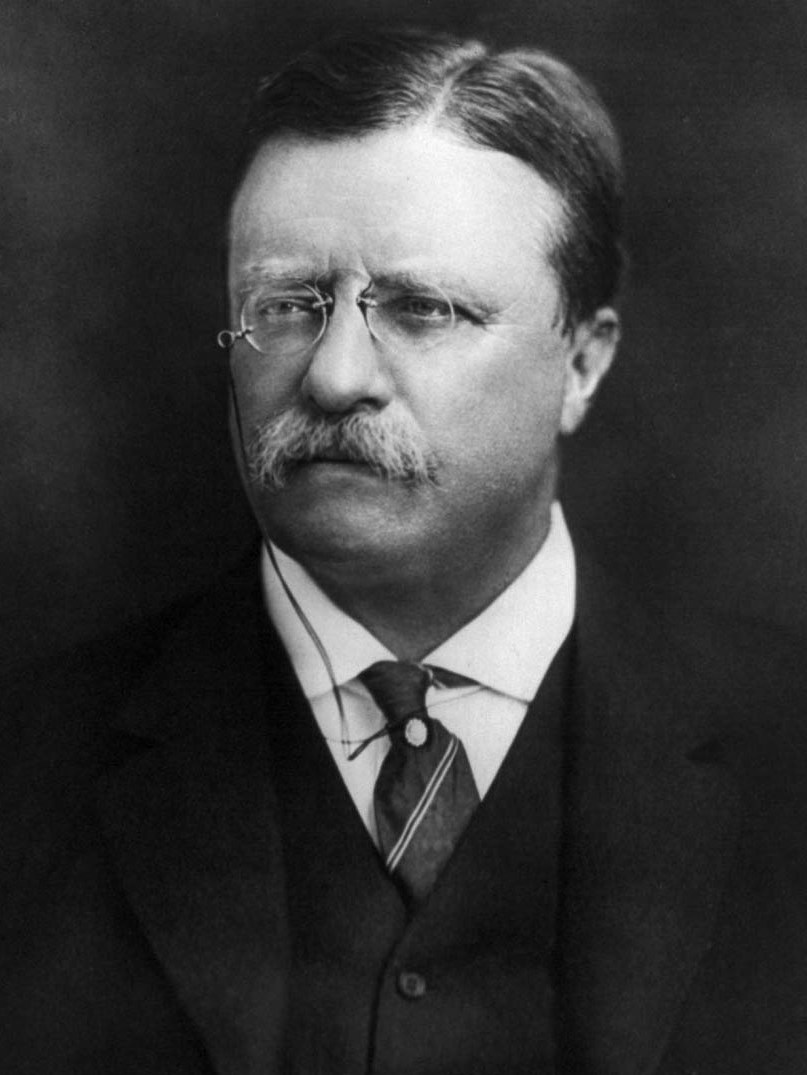
Nominee	Woodrow Wilson	William Howard Taft	Theodore Roosevelt
Party	Democratic	Republican	Progressive
Home state	New Jersey	Ohio	New York
Running mate	Thomas R. Marshall	Nicholas Murray Butler	Hiram Johnson
Electoral vote	18	0	0
Popular vote	330,746	207,821	124,375
Percentage	47.35%	29.75%	17.80%
County results
Wilson
30–40%
40–50%
50–60%
60–70%
70–80%
80–90%
Taft
30–40%
40–50%
50–60%
Roosevelt
30–40%
President before election
William Howard Taft
Republican
Elected President
Woodrow Wilson
Democratic

The 1912 United States presidential election in Missouri took place on November 5, 1912, as part of the 1912 United States presidential election. Voters chose 18 representatives, or electors, to the Electoral College, who voted for president and vice president.

Missouri was won by governor of New Jersey Woodrow Wilson (D), running with governor of Indiana Thomas R. Marshall, with 47.35% of the popular vote, against the 27th president of the United States William Howard Taft (R–Ohio), running with Columbia University President Nicholas Murray Butler, with 29.75% of the popular vote and the 26th president of the United States Theodore Roosevelt (P–New York), running with governor of California Hiram Johnson, with 17.80% of the popular vote. As of the 2020 presidential election, this is the last election in which Douglas County and Ozark County did not vote for the Republican presidential candidate.

== Results ==
1912 United States presidential election in Missouri
Party	Candidate	Votes	%
Democratic	Woodrow Wilson	330,746	47.35%
Republican	William Howard Taft (incumbent)	207,821	29.75%
Progressive	Theodore Roosevelt	124,375	17.80%
Socialist	Eugene V. Debs	28,466	4.07%
Prohibition	Eugene Chafin	5,380	0.77%
Socialist Labor	Arthur Reimer	1,778	0.25%
Total votes		698,566	100%

=== Results by county ===
1912 United States presidential election in Missouri by county
County	Woodrow Wilson Democratic		William Howard Taft Republican		Theodore Roosevelt Progressive "Bull Moose"		Eugene V. Debs Socialist		Various candidates Other parties		Margin		Total votes cast
County	#	%	#	%	#	%	#	%	#	%	#	%	Total votes cast
Adair	1,784	36.46%	1,427	29.16%	1,200	24.52%	398	8.13%	84	1.72%	357	7.30%	4,893
Andrew	1,750	45.00%	1,634	42.02%	432	11.11%	31	0.80%	42	1.08%	116	2.98%	3,889
Atchison	1,534	46.53%	1,138	34.52%	529	16.04%	37	1.12%	59	1.79%	396	12.01%	3,297
Audrain	3,332	64.79%	1,360	26.44%	377	7.33%	31	0.60%	43	0.84%	1,972	38.34%	5,143
Barry	2,300	45.65%	1,396	27.71%	1,053	20.90%	227	4.51%	62	1.23%	904	17.94%	5,038
Barton	1,791	47.12%	1,010	26.57%	639	16.81%	280	7.37%	81	2.13%	781	20.55%	3,801
Bates	3,057	50.72%	1,383	22.95%	1,301	21.59%	151	2.51%	135	2.24%	1,674	27.78%	6,027
Benton	1,209	39.57%	1,142	37.38%	618	20.23%	54	1.77%	32	1.05%	67	2.19%	3,055
Bollinger	1,512	48.93%	1,100	35.60%	348	11.26%	102	3.30%	28	0.91%	412	13.33%	3,090
Boone	5,027	70.23%	1,350	18.86%	695	9.71%	54	0.75%	32	0.45%	3,677	51.37%	7,158
Buchanan	8,869	53.18%	4,412	26.46%	2,639	15.83%	623	3.74%	133	0.80%	4,457	26.73%	16,676
Butler	1,946	41.71%	1,851	39.68%	408	8.75%	407	8.72%	53	1.14%	95	2.04%	4,665
Caldwell	1,483	40.36%	1,187	32.31%	965	26.27%	6	0.16%	33	0.90%	296	8.06%	3,674
Callaway	3,544	65.61%	1,525	28.23%	284	5.26%	13	0.24%	36	0.67%	2,019	37.38%	5,402
Camden	667	35.69%	918	49.12%	246	13.16%	30	1.61%	8	0.43%	-251	-13.43%	1,869
Cape Girardeau	2,587	44.19%	2,203	37.63%	899	15.36%	110	1.88%	55	0.94%	384	6.56%	5,854
Carroll	2,648	46.80%	1,519	26.85%	1,361	24.05%	73	1.29%	57	1.01%	1,129	19.95%	5,658
Carter	458	49.46%	256	27.65%	116	12.53%	78	8.42%	18	1.94%	202	21.81%	926
Cass	3,247	57.70%	1,034	18.38%	1,178	20.93%	103	1.83%	65	1.16%	2,069 (Note: In this county where Taft finished third behind Roosevelt, margin given is Wilson vote minus Roosevelt vote and percentage margin Wilson percentage minus Roosevelt percentage.)	36.77%	5,627
Cedar	1,392	40.42%	1,242	36.06%	623	18.09%	134	3.89%	53	1.54%	150	4.36%	3,444
Chariton	3,112	56.90%	1,528	27.94%	745	13.62%	37	0.68%	47	0.86%	1,584	28.96%	5,469
Christian	793	26.07%	1,203	39.55%	832	27.35%	176	5.79%	38	1.25%	371 (Note: In this county where Wilson finished third behind both Taft and Roosevelt, margin given is Taft vote minus Roosevelt vote and percentage margin Taft percentage minus Roosevelt percentage.)	12.20%	3,042
Clark	1,586	47.73%	1,214	36.53%	484	14.57%	12	0.36%	27	0.81%	372	11.19%	3,323
Clay	3,417	72.00%	592	12.47%	679	14.31%	41	0.86%	17	0.36%	2,738	57.69%	4,746
Clinton	1,968	56.42%	777	22.28%	679	19.47%	10	0.29%	54	1.55%	1,191	34.15%	3,488
Cole	2,447	50.29%	2,103	43.22%	252	5.18%	45	0.92%	19	0.39%	344	7.07%	4,866
Cooper	2,444	48.28%	2,270	44.84%	299	5.91%	26	0.51%	23	0.45%	174	3.44%	5,062
Crawford	1,037	41.71%	1,045	42.04%	327	13.15%	54	2.17%	23	0.93%	-8	-0.32%	2,486
Dade	1,313	38.81%	1,196	35.35%	776	22.94%	59	1.74%	39	1.15%	117	3.46%	3,383
Dallas	870	35.61%	1,051	43.02%	480	19.65%	24	0.98%	18	0.74%	-181	-7.41%	2,443
Daviess	2,284	49.29%	1,099	23.72%	1,170	25.25%	12	0.26%	69	1.49%	1,114	24.04%	4,634
DeKalb	1,652	50.18%	1,090	33.11%	499	15.16%	16	0.49%	35	1.06%	562	17.07%	3,292
Dent	1,280	51.38%	959	38.50%	153	6.14%	79	3.17%	20	0.80%	321	12.89%	2,491
Douglas	566	20.23%	855	30.56%	1,092	39.03%	255	9.11%	30	1.07%	-237	-8.47%	2,798
Dunklin	2,723	51.89%	987	18.81%	494	9.41%	1,001	19.07%	43	0.82%	1,722 (Note: In this county where Debs ran second ahead of both Roosevelt and Taft, margin given is Wilson vote minus Debs vote and percentage margin Wilson percentage minus Debs percentage.)	32.81%	5,248
Franklin	2,239	40.02%	2,424	43.32%	671	11.99%	213	3.81%	48	0.86%	-185	-3.31%	5,595
Gasconade	518	19.84%	1,539	58.94%	495	18.96%	25	0.96%	34	1.30%	-1,021	-39.10%	2,611
Gentry	2,268	54.25%	1,268	30.33%	524	12.53%	56	1.34%	65	1.55%	1,000	23.92%	4,181
Greene	5,089	40.52%	4,350	34.63%	2,184	17.39%	758	6.04%	179	1.43%	739	5.88%	12,560
Grundy	1,310	33.44%	1,051	26.83%	1,484	37.89%	24	0.61%	48	1.23%	-174	-4.44%	3,917
Harrison	1,985	38.62%	2,081	40.49%	965	18.77%	37	0.72%	72	1.40%	-96	-1.87%	5,140
Henry	3,396	53.78%	1,162	18.40%	1,500	23.75%	132	2.09%	125	1.98%	1,896	30.02%	6,315
Hickory	421	26.25%	735	45.82%	375	23.38%	58	3.62%	15	0.94%	-314	-19.58%	1,604
Holt	1,519	41.14%	1,522	41.22%	583	15.79%	23	0.62%	45	1.22%	-3	-0.08%	3,692
Howard	2,672	70.48%	896	23.63%	192	5.06%	15	0.40%	16	0.42%	1,776	46.85%	3,791
Howell	1,565	36.45%	1,465	34.12%	836	19.47%	368	8.57%	60	1.40%	100	2.33%	4,294
Iron	845	51.03%	666	40.22%	65	3.93%	55	3.32%	25	1.51%	179	10.81%	1,656
Jackson	32,209	50.97%	5,618	8.89%	23,152	36.64%	1,697	2.69%	518	0.82%	9,057	14.33%	63,194
Jasper	6,789	40.64%	4,571	27.36%	3,309	19.81%	1,676	10.03%	359	2.15%	2,218	13.28%	16,704
Jefferson	2,368	45.47%	2,127	40.84%	485	9.31%	200	3.84%	28	0.54%	241	4.63%	5,208
Johnson	3,468	52.87%	1,772	27.02%	1,141	17.40%	95	1.45%	83	1.27%	1,696	25.86%	6,559
Knox	1,666	52.99%	1,092	34.73%	297	9.45%	43	1.37%	46	1.46%	574	18.26%	3,144
Laclede	1,634	44.03%	1,478	39.83%	463	12.48%	113	3.05%	23	0.62%	156	4.20%	3,711
Lafayette	3,650	48.93%	2,367	31.73%	1,241	16.64%	157	2.10%	44	0.59%	1,283	17.20%	7,459
Lawrence	2,384	42.45%	1,312	23.36%	1,536	27.35%	311	5.54%	73	1.30%	848	15.10%	5,616
Lewis	2,340	62.27%	1,004	26.72%	334	8.89%	47	1.25%	33	0.88%	1,336	35.55%	3,758
Lincoln	2,326	61.32%	1,258	33.17%	167	4.40%	10	0.26%	32	0.84%	1,068	28.16%	3,793
Linn	2,890	48.13%	1,452	24.18%	1,434	23.88%	131	2.18%	97	1.62%	1,438	23.95%	6,004
Livingston	2,314	48.04%	885	18.37%	1,502	31.18%	58	1.20%	58	1.20%	812	16.86%	4,817
Macon	3,610	51.68%	1,288	18.44%	1,830	26.20%	171	2.45%	86	1.23%	1,780	25.48%	6,985
Madison	1,126	51.18%	827	37.59%	171	7.77%	53	2.41%	23	1.05%	299	13.59%	2,200
Maries	1,096	63.39%	448	25.91%	128	7.40%	39	2.26%	18	1.04%	648	37.48%	1,729
Marion	3,471	58.74%	1,693	28.65%	531	8.99%	125	2.12%	89	1.51%	1,778	30.09%	5,909
McDonald	1,326	46.06%	916	31.82%	442	15.35%	157	5.45%	38	1.32%	410	14.24%	2,879
Mercer	780	27.34%	995	34.88%	996	34.91%	42	1.47%	40	1.40%	-1	-0.04%	2,853
Miller	1,257	39.52%	1,240	38.98%	512	16.10%	143	4.50%	29	0.91%	17	0.53%	3,181
Mississippi	1,388	52.20%	1,050	39.49%	78	2.93%	119	4.48%	24	0.90%	338	12.71%	2,659
Moniteau	1,612	48.76%	1,375	41.59%	215	6.50%	67	2.03%	37	1.12%	237	7.17%	3,306
Monroe	3,586	80.22%	583	13.04%	218	4.88%	64	1.43%	19	0.43%	3,003	67.18%	4,470
Montgomery	1,883	48.54%	1,697	43.75%	219	5.65%	23	0.59%	57	1.47%	186	4.80%	3,879
Morgan	1,163	42.68%	1,239	45.47%	282	10.35%	19	0.70%	22	0.81%	-76	-2.79%	2,725
New Madrid	1,945	43.04%	1,607	35.56%	344	7.61%	564	12.48%	59	1.31%	338	7.48%	4,519
Newton	2,421	44.84%	1,470	27.23%	1,033	19.13%	341	6.32%	134	2.48%	951	17.61%	5,399
Nodaway	3,490	49.49%	2,139	30.33%	1,307	18.53%	49	0.69%	67	0.95%	1,351	19.16%	7,052
Oregon	1,688	62.94%	486	18.12%	333	12.42%	164	6.11%	11	0.41%	1,202	44.82%	2,682
Osage	1,394	47.69%	981	33.56%	485	16.59%	29	0.99%	34	1.16%	413	14.13%	2,923
Ozark	575	27.05%	695	32.69%	787	37.02%	50	2.35%	19	0.89%	-92	-4.33%	2,126
Pemiscot	1,617	51.11%	973	30.75%	283	8.94%	259	8.19%	32	1.01%	644	20.35%	3,164
Perry	1,564	45.85%	1,735	50.86%	86	2.52%	15	0.44%	11	0.32%	-171	-5.01%	3,411
Pettis	3,771	47.12%	2,423	30.28%	1,512	18.89%	210	2.62%	87	1.09%	1,348	16.84%	8,003
Phelps	1,565	55.58%	782	27.77%	379	13.46%	63	2.24%	27	0.96%	783	27.81%	2,816
Pike	2,720	56.01%	1,901	39.15%	176	3.62%	32	0.66%	27	0.56%	819	16.87%	4,856
Platte	2,535	73.58%	510	14.80%	375	10.89%	11	0.32%	14	0.41%	2,025	58.78%	3,445
Polk	1,935	41.92%	1,802	39.04%	754	16.33%	81	1.75%	44	0.95%	133	2.88%	4,616
Pulaski	1,268	56.66%	631	28.19%	267	11.93%	40	1.79%	32	1.43%	637	28.46%	2,238
Putnam	933	27.96%	1,859	55.71%	420	12.59%	64	1.92%	61	1.83%	-926	-27.75%	3,337
Ralls	1,734	67.13%	591	22.88%	240	9.29%	8	0.31%	10	0.39%	1,143	44.25%	2,583
Randolph	4,186	68.18%	1,126	18.34%	641	10.44%	119	1.94%	68	1.11%	3,060	49.84%	6,140
Ray	3,042	61.70%	1,192	24.18%	561	11.38%	80	1.62%	55	1.12%	1,850	37.53%	4,930
Reynolds	1,030	62.27%	367	22.19%	169	10.22%	77	4.66%	11	0.67%	663	40.08%	1,654
Ripley	1,249	51.17%	651	26.67%	353	14.46%	157	6.43%	31	1.27%	598	24.50%	2,441
Saint Charles	1,792	37.36%	2,350	49.00%	525	10.95%	105	2.19%	24	0.50%	-558	-11.63%	4,796
Saint Clair	1,710	46.00%	1,046	28.14%	727	19.56%	190	5.11%	44	1.18%	664	17.86%	3,717
Saint Francois	2,786	44.76%	2,305	37.03%	344	5.53%	732	11.76%	58	0.93%	481	7.73%	6,225
Saint Louis County	5,409	34.84%	6,177	39.78%	2,854	18.38%	929	5.98%	157	1.01%	-768	-4.95%	15,526
Saint Louis City	58,845	41.93%	46,509	33.14%	24,746	17.63%	9,159	6.53%	1,068	0.76%	12,336	8.79%	140,327
Sainte Genevieve	1,138	49.22%	1,100	47.58%	47	2.03%	19	0.82%	8	0.35%	38	1.64%	2,312
Saline	3,929	57.01%	1,443	20.94%	1,413	20.50%	41	0.59%	66	0.96%	2,486	36.07%	6,892
Schuyler	1,218	54.35%	766	34.18%	193	8.61%	30	1.34%	34	1.52%	452	20.17%	2,241
Scotland	1,525	53.34%	860	30.08%	379	13.26%	65	2.27%	30	1.05%	665	23.26%	2,859
Scott	1,945	46.45%	1,235	29.50%	303	7.24%	649	15.50%	55	1.31%	710	16.96%	4,187
Shannon	1,110	52.98%	385	18.38%	376	17.95%	193	9.21%	31	1.48%	725	34.61%	2,095
Shelby	2,450	65.51%	859	22.97%	331	8.85%	33	0.88%	67	1.79%	1,591	42.54%	3,740
Stoddard	2,603	49.54%	1,363	25.94%	586	11.15%	648	12.33%	54	1.03%	1,240	23.60%	5,254
Stone	506	22.18%	946	41.47%	642	28.15%	165	7.23%	22	0.96%	304	13.33%	2,281
Sullivan	2,226	47.35%	1,819	38.69%	576	12.25%	43	0.91%	37	0.79%	407	8.66%	4,701
Taney	588	32.98%	852	47.78%	259	14.53%	72	4.04%	12	0.67%	-264	-14.81%	1,783
Texas	2,067	51.30%	1,232	30.58%	553	13.73%	129	3.20%	48	1.19%	835	20.72%	4,029
Vernon	3,483	55.94%	1,654	26.57%	655	10.52%	323	5.19%	111	1.78%	1,829	29.38%	6,226
Warren	431	21.09%	1,067	52.20%	499	24.41%	36	1.76%	11	0.54%	568	27.79%	2,044
Washington	1,121	43.69%	1,059	41.27%	307	11.96%	53	2.07%	26	1.01%	62	2.42%	2,566
Wayne	1,432	48.26%	1,052	35.46%	304	10.25%	152	5.12%	27	0.91%	380	12.81%	2,967
Webster	1,649	42.12%	1,387	35.43%	744	19.00%	82	2.09%	53	1.35%	262	6.69%	3,915
Worth	973	49.49%	769	39.11%	183	9.31%	6	0.31%	35	1.78%	204	10.38%	1,966
Wright	1,356	38.45%	1,163	32.97%	895	25.38%	86	2.44%	27	0.77%	193	5.47%	3,527
Totals	330,746	47.35%	207,821	29.75%	124,375	17.80%	28,466	4.07%	7,158	1.02%	122,925	17.60%	698,566

== See also ==
- United States presidential elections in Missouri
