= Pleasant Mount, Missouri =

Unincorporated community in Missouri, U.S.

Pleasant Mount or Mount Pleasant is an unincorporated community in Miller County, in the U.S. state of Missouri. The historic community was located along the current Missouri Route FF on a hilltop approximately one-half mile north of the railroad line. The current community of Mount Pleasant or Mt Pleasant is just south of U.S. Route 54, about three miles northeast of Eldon at 38°22′05″N 92°31′25″W.

== History ==
Pleasant Mount was platted in 1838. A post office called Pleasant Mount was established in 1847, and remained in operation until 1909. A variant name is "Mount Pleasant".
