= St. Elizabeth, Missouri =

- Village
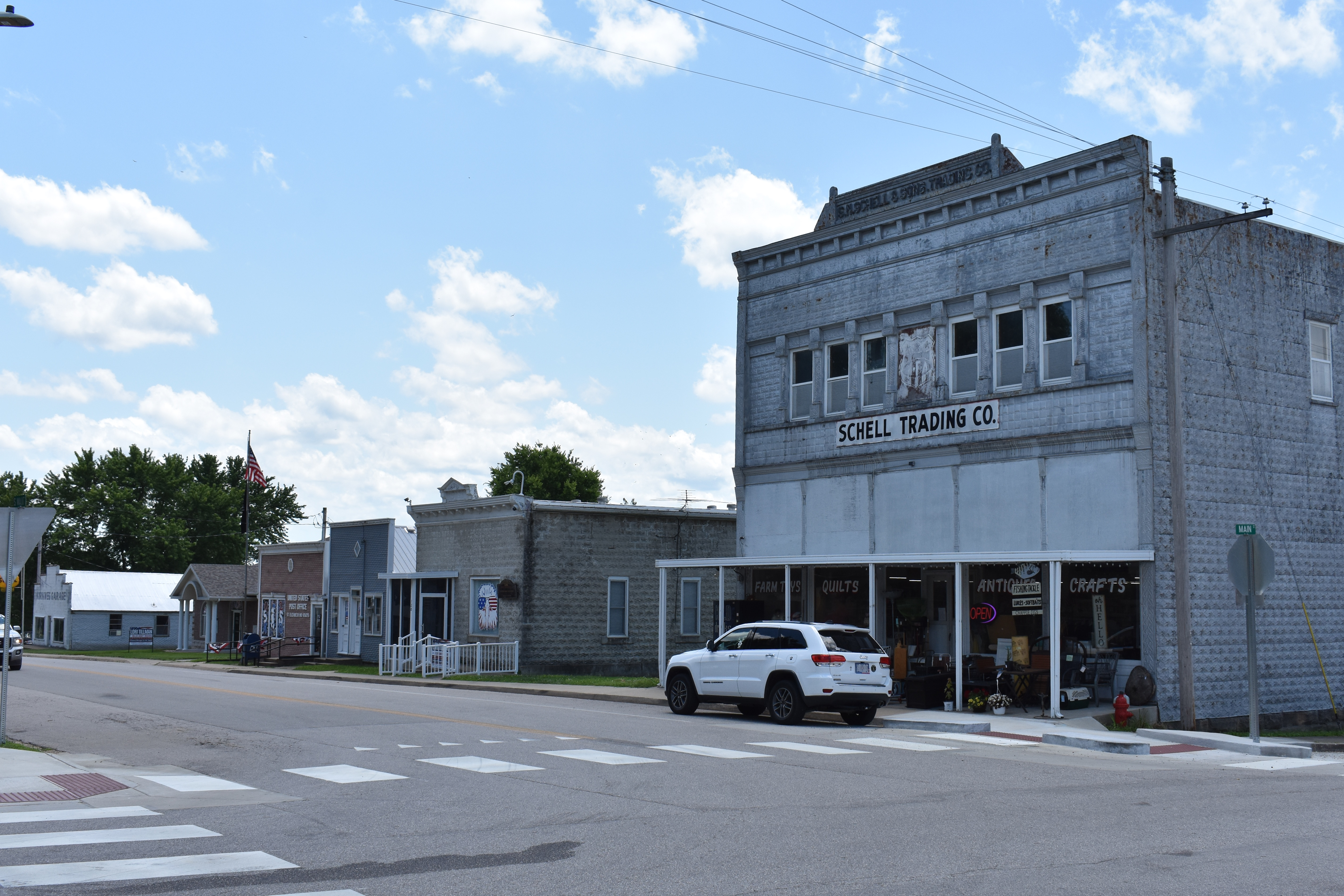
- St Elizabeth in June 2026

- Location in Miller County and the state of Missouri
- Coordinates: 38°15′20″N 92°16′6″W
- Country: United States
- State: Missouri
- County: Miller
- Founded: 1875 (as Charlestown); 1877 (as St. Elizabeth)

Area
  - Total: 1.04 sq mi (2.70 km^{2})
  - Land: 1.04 sq mi (2.70 km^{2})
  - Water: 0 sq mi (0.00 km^{2})
- Elevation: 807 ft (246 m)

Population (2020)
  - Total: 418
  - Density: 401.6/sq mi (155.04/km^{2})
- Time zone: UTC-6 (Central (CST))
  - Summer (DST): UTC-5 (CDT)
- ZIP code: 65075
- Area code: 573
- FIPS code: 29-64190
- GNIS feature ID: 2399162
- Website: stelizabethmo.org

St. Elizabeth or Saint Elizabeth is a village in Miller County, Missouri, United States. The population was 418 at the 2020 census, up from 336 in 2010.

== History ==
St. Elizabeth was originally called "Charlestown", and under the latter name was platted in 1875, after Charley Holtschneider, the original owner of the town site. A post office called St. Elizabeth has been in operation since 1877. The present name is derived from a local Roman Catholic church of the same name, which in turn most likely was named after Elizabeth of Hungary.

The Boeckman Bridge was added to the National Register of Historic Places in 1979.

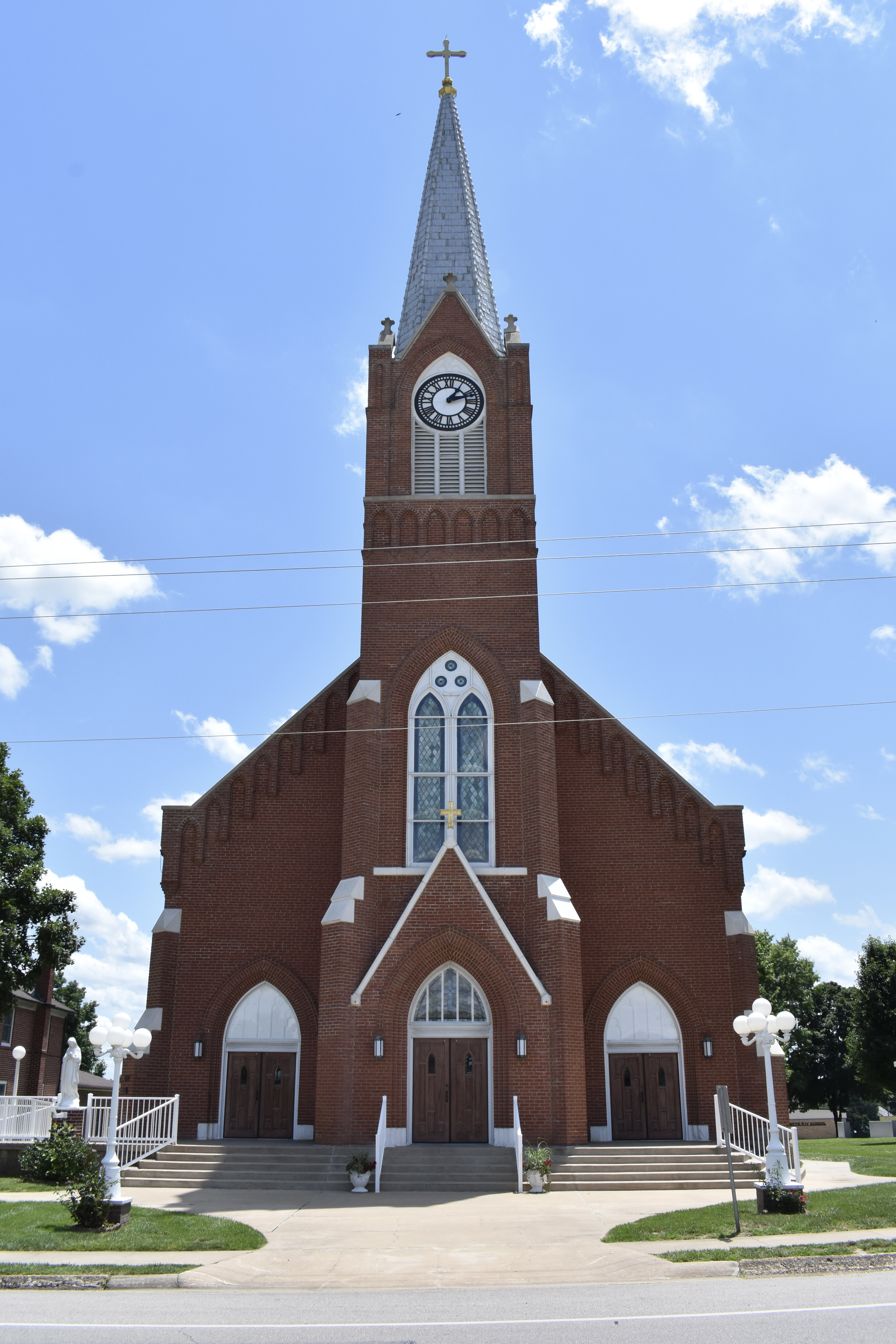
St. Lawrence Catholic Church in St Elizabeth, Missouri. June 2026

== Geography ==
St. Elizabeth is located in northeast Miller County at the intersection of Missouri routes 52 and E. The Osage River flows past two miles west of the community. Tuscumbia, the county seat, is 14 miles (23 km) to the west, and Meta in adjacent Osage County is 9 miles (14 km) to the northeast, both via Route 52.

According to the U.S. Census Bureau, St. Elizabeth has a total area of 1.04 square miles (2.69 km^{2}), all land. The village sits on top of a ridge which drains west to Whalen Creek and east to Tavern Creek, both of which are north-flowing tributaries of the Osage River.

== Demographics ==
Historical population
Census	Pop.	Note	%±
1880	15		—
1950	59		—
1960	57		−3.4%
1970	287		403.5%
1980	312		8.7%
1990	257		−17.6%
2000	297		15.6%
2010	336		13.1%
2020	418		24.4%
U.S. Decennial Census

=== 2010 census ===
As of the census of 2010, there were 336 people, 115 households, and 84 families living in the village. The population density was 329.4 inhabitants per square mile (127.2/km^{2}). There were 128 housing units at an average density of 125.5 per square mile (48.5/km^{2}). The racial makeup of the village was 99.1% White and 0.9% from two or more races. Hispanic or Latino of any race were 1.8% of the population.

There were 115 households, of which 37.4% had children under the age of 18 living with them, 56.5% were married couples living together, 13.0% had a female householder with no husband present, 3.5% had a male householder with no wife present, and 27.0% were non-families. 26.1% of all households were made up of individuals, and 18.3% had someone living alone who was 65 years of age or older. The average household size was 2.63 and the average family size was 3.17.

The median age in the village was 39.5 years. 28.9% of residents were under the age of 18; 5.9% were between the ages of 18 and 24; 20.7% were from 25 to 44; 21.2% were from 45 to 64; and 23.5% were 65 years of age or older. The gender makeup of the village was 44.9% male and 55.1% female.

=== 2000 census ===
As of the census of 2000, there were 297 people, 91 households, and 63 families living in the village. The population density was 327.7 inhabitants per square mile (126.5/km^{2}). There were 99 housing units at an average density of 109.2 per square mile (42.2/km^{2}). The racial makeup of the village was 99.33% White. Hispanic or Latino of any race were 0.67% of the population. The majority of families in St. Elizabeth are of Germanic descent.

There were 91 households, out of which 37.4% had children under the age of 18 living with them, 67.0% were married couples living together, 1.1% had a female householder with no husband present, and 29.7% were non-families. 27.5% of all households were made up of individuals, and 19.8% had someone living alone who was 65 years of age or older. The average household size was 2.73 and the average family size was 3.39.

In the village, the population was spread out, with 25.9% under the age of 18, 6.1% from 18 to 24, 25.3% from 25 to 44, 10.1% from 45 to 64, and 32.7% who were 65 years of age or older. The median age was 40 years. For every 100 females, there were 88.0 males. For every 100 females age 18 and over, there were 77.4 males.

The median income for a household in the village was $99,375, and the median income for a family was $42,188. Males had a median income of $27,031 versus $19,375 for females. The per capita income for the village was $43,882. None of the families and 2.7% of the population were living below the poverty line, including no under eighteens and 6.6% of those over 64.

== Notable person ==
- Blaine Luetkemeyer, former U.S. representative and state representative
