= Etterville, Missouri =

Unincorporated community in Missouri, U.S.

Coordinates: 38°22′03″N 92°28′13″W

Etterville is an unincorporated community in northern Miller County, Missouri, United States. It is located six miles east of Eldon on U.S. Route 54.

A variant name was "Etter". Some say Etterville was named after Samuel Etter, a liquor producer, while others believe the community has the name of the local Etter family. A post office called Etter was established in 1903, the name was changed to Etterville in 1904; and the post office closed in 2000.
