= Tuscumbia, Missouri =

Village in Missouri, U.S.

- Village
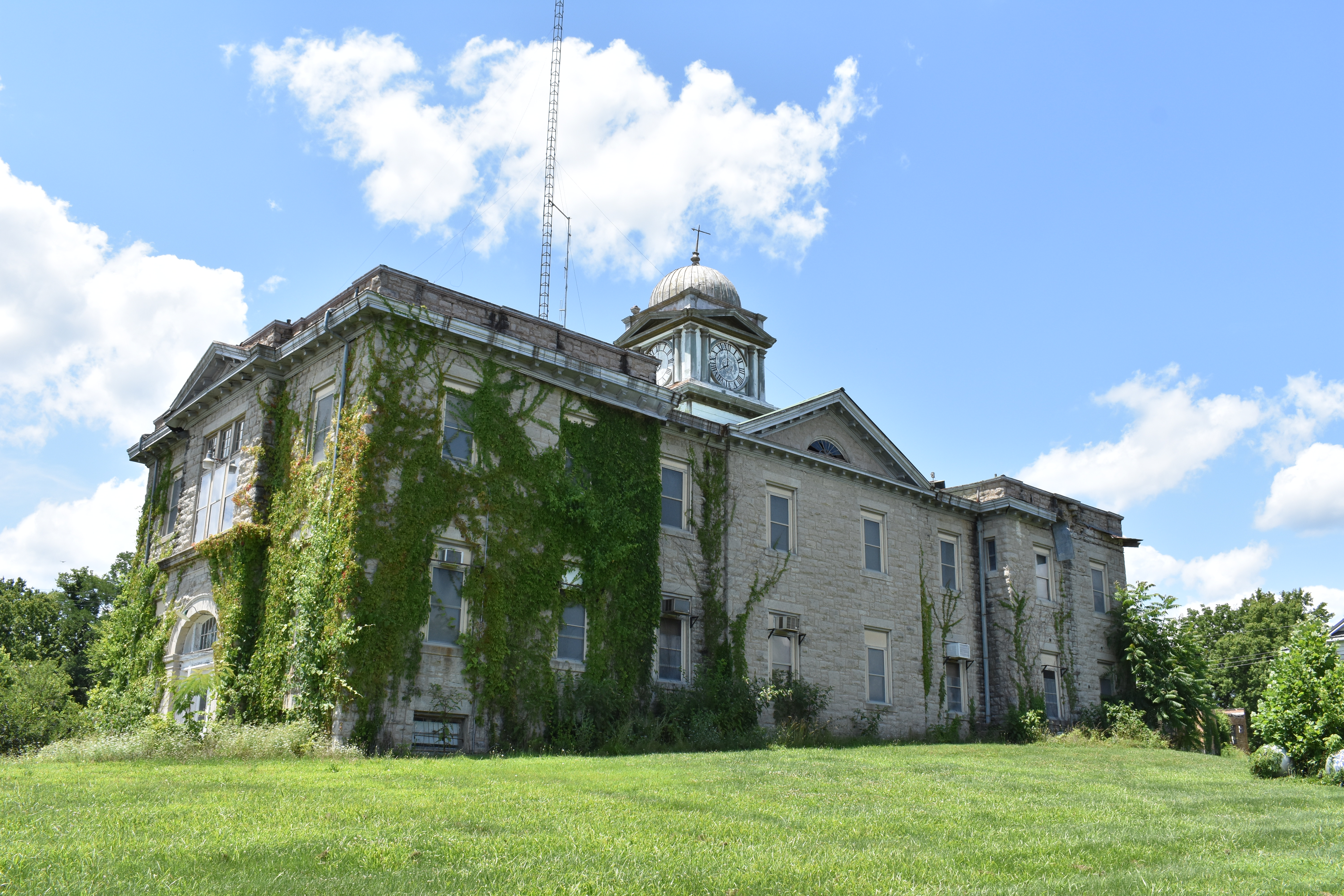
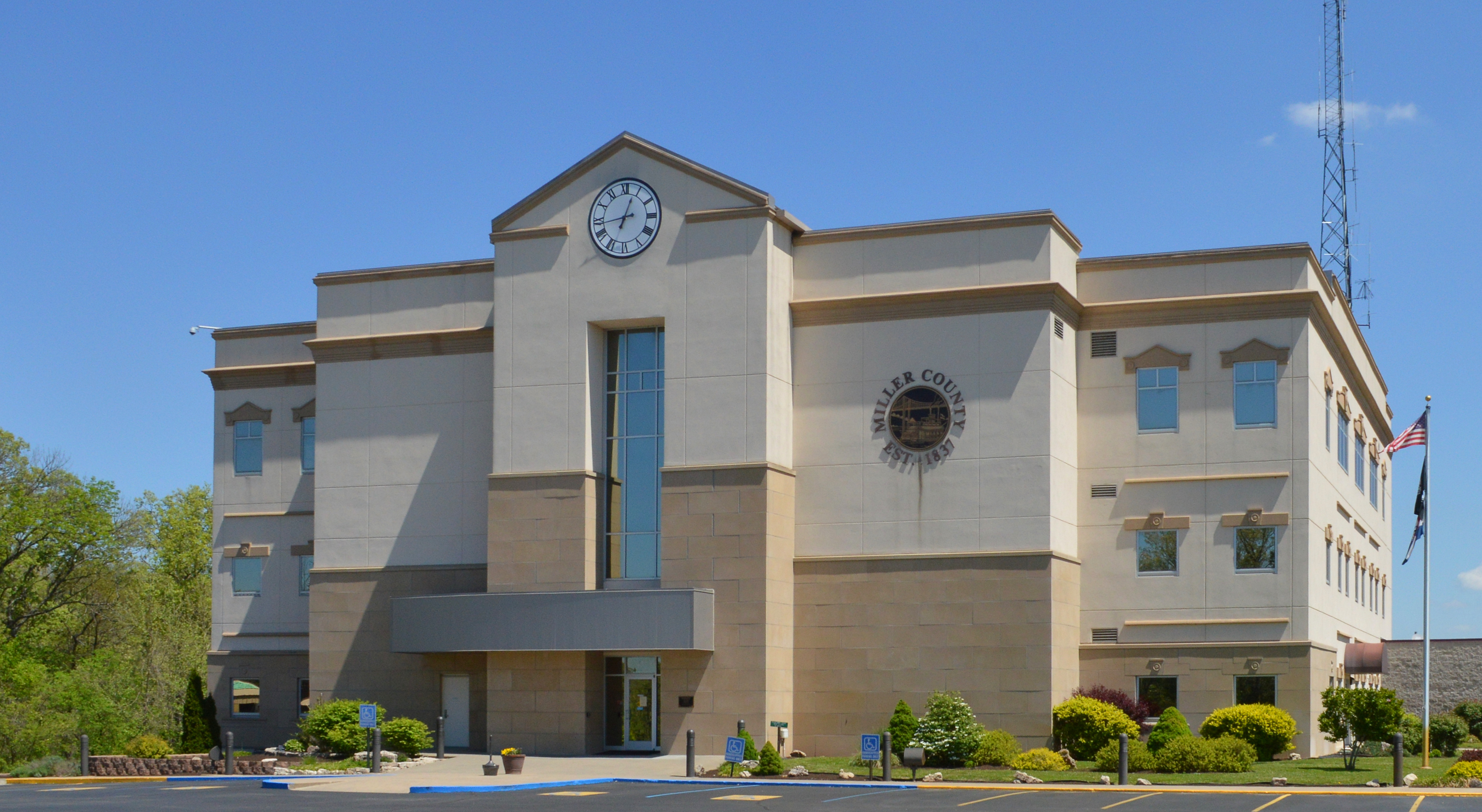
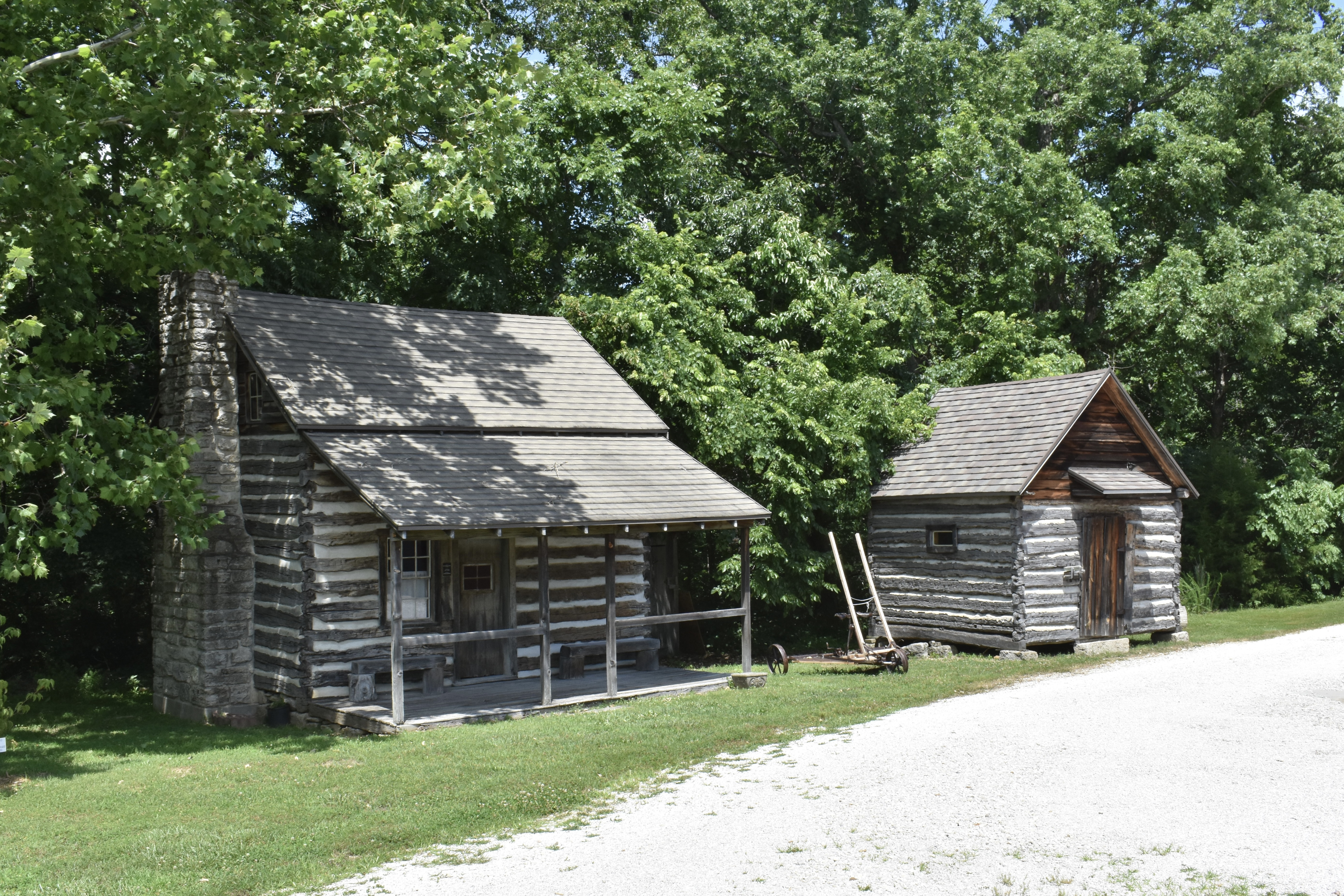
- Old Miller County Courthouse Miller County Courthouse Log Cabins in Tuscumbia

- Location in Miller County and the state of Missouri
- Coordinates: 38°14′13″N 92°27′36″W
- Country: United States
- State: Missouri
- County: Miller
- Founded: 1837
- Incorporated: 1837

Area
  - Total: 0.34 sq mi (0.89 km^{2})
  - Land: 0.34 sq mi (0.89 km^{2})
  - Water: 0 sq mi (0.00 km^{2})
- Elevation: 725 ft (221 m)

Population (2020)
  - Total: 188
  - Density: 545.6/sq mi (210.64/km^{2})
- Time zone: UTC-6 (Central (CST))
  - Summer (DST): UTC-5 (CDT)
- ZIP code: 65082
- Area code: 573
- FIPS code: 29-74194
- GNIS feature ID: 2397702
- Website: www.tuscumbiavillagemo.gov

Tuscumbia is a village in and the county seat of Miller County, Missouri, United States, that is on the Osage River. The population was 188 at the 2020 census.

== History ==
Tuscumbia was laid out in 1837. The community's name most likely is a transfer from Tuscumbia, Alabama. A post office called Tuscumbia has been in operation since 1837.

== Geography ==
Tuscumbia is located in central Miller County on the north bank of the Osage River, near the junction of Missouri routes 17 and 52. Route 17 leads northeast 10 miles (16 km) to Eugene and southeast 15 miles (24 km) to Iberia, while Route 52 leads northwest 12 miles (19 km) to Eldon and east 14 miles (23 km) to St. Elizabeth.

According to the U.S. Census Bureau, Tuscumbia has a total area of 0.35 square miles (0.91 km^{2}), all land.

== Demographics ==
Historical population
Census	Pop.	Note	%±
1860	77		—
1870	125		62.3%
1880	157		25.6%
1890	288		83.4%
1900	225		−21.9%
1910	285		26.7%
1920	256		−10.2%
1930	282		10.2%
1940	269		−4.6%
1950	221		−17.8%
1960	231		4.5%
1970	256		10.8%
1980	241		−5.9%
1990	148		−38.6%
2000	218		47.3%
2010	203		−6.9%
2020	188		−7.4%
U.S. Decennial Census

=== 2010 census ===
As of the census of 2010, there were 203 people, 55 households, and 38 families living in the village. The population density was 580.0 inhabitants per square mile (223.9/km^{2}). There were 70 housing units at an average density of 200.0 per square mile (77.2/km^{2}). The racial makeup of the village was 93.6% White, 3.9% African American, 2.0% Native American, and 0.5% from other races. Hispanic or Latino of any race were 5.9% of the population.

There were 55 households, of which 34.5% had children under the age of 18 living with them, 47.3% were married couples living together, 12.7% had a female householder with no husband present, 9.1% had a male householder with no wife present, and 30.9% were non-families. 25.5% of all households were made up of individuals, and 9.1% had someone living alone who was 65 years of age or older. The average household size was 2.56 and the average family size was 2.97.

The median age in the village was 36.7 years. 18.2% of residents were under the age of 18; 11.3% were between the ages of 18 and 24; 36.1% were from 25 to 44; 28.1% were from 45 to 64; and 6.4% were 65 years of age or older. The gender makeup of the village was 65.0% male and 35.0% female.

=== 2000 census ===
As of the census of 2000, there were 218 people, 57 households, and 40 families living in the town. The population density was 617.2 inhabitants per square mile (238.3/km^{2}). There were 72 housing units at an average density of 203.9 per square mile (78.7/km^{2}). The racial makeup of the town was 95.41% White, 1.83% African American, 0.46% Native American, 0.92% Asian, and 1.38% from two or more races. Hispanic or Latino of any race were 1.38% of the population.

There were 57 households, out of which 29.8% had children under the age of 18 living with them, 54.4% were married couples living together, 14.0% had a female householder with no husband present, and 28.1% were non-families. 24.6% of all households were made up of individuals, and 15.8% had someone living alone who was 65 years of age or older. The average household size was 2.35 and the average family size was 2.68.

In the town the population was spread out, with 15.1% under the age of 18, 20.2% from 18 to 24, 31.7% from 25 to 44, 22.5% from 45 to 64, and 10.6% who were 65 years of age or older. The median age was 35 years. For every 100 females, there were 159.5 males. For every 100 females age 18 and over, there were 156.9 males.

The median income for a household in the town was $19,375, and the median income for a family was $26,875. Males had a median income of $15,341 versus $16,000 for females. The per capita income for the town was $8,117. About 12.0% of families and 19.3% of the population were below the poverty line, including 35.7% of those under the age of eighteen and 36.8% of those 65 or over.

== Notable people ==
- Derrick Helton (born 1985), Paralympic wheelchair rugby player
- Paul Henning (1911–2005), creator of The Beverly Hillbillies, Green Acres and Petticoat Junction; buried in Tuscumbia
- Alex White (born 1988), featherweight mixed martial artist competing in the UFC
- Ina Phillips Williams (1876 – 1934), early female legislator in Washington state; born in Tuscumbia
- Don Woody (born 1937), rockabilly drummer and comedian; born in Tuscumbia

== See also ==
- List of cities in Missouri
