= Iberia, Missouri =

- City
- Location in Miller County and the state of Missouri
- Coordinates: 38°05′19″N 92°17′46″W
- Country: United States
- State: Missouri
- County: Miller
- Founded: 1860

Area
  - Total: 0.88 sq mi (2.28 km^{2})
  - Land: 0.88 sq mi (2.28 km^{2})
  - Water: 0 sq mi (0.00 km^{2})
- Elevation: 938 ft (286 m)

Population (2020)
  - Total: 703
  - Density: 797.9/sq mi (308.08/km^{2})
- Time zone: UTC-6 (Central (CST))
  - Summer (DST): UTC-5 (CDT)
- ZIP code: 65486
- Area code: 573
- FIPS code: 29-34228
- GNIS feature ID: 2394462

Iberia is a city in southeast Miller County, Missouri, United States. The population was 703 as of the 2020 census.

== History ==
A post office called Iberia has been in operation since 1838. The community derives its name from the Iberian Peninsula perhaps via New Iberia, Louisiana.

Iberia Academy and Junior College was added to the National Register of Historic Places in 1980.

== Geography ==
Iberia is located in southeastern Miller County in the Ozarks of central Missouri. The city is at the intersection of routes 17 and 42. Route 17 leads northwest 15 miles (24 km) to Tuscumbia, the Miller county seat, and south 11 miles (18 km) to Crocker, while Route 42 leads west 18 miles (29 km) to Lake of the Ozarks State Park and northeast 22 miles (35 km) to Vienna.

According to the U.S. Census Bureau, Iberia has a total area of 0.88 square miles (2.28 km^{2}), all land. The city is drained to the north by Rabbithead Creek, a tributary of Tavern Creek, which in turn flows north to the Osage River.

=== Climate ===
Climate data for Iberia, Missouri (1991–2020)
Month	Jan	Feb	Mar	Apr	May	Jun	Jul	Aug	Sep	Oct	Nov	Dec	Year
Mean daily maximum °F (°C)	41.1 (5.1)	46.5 (8.1)	56.3 (13.5)	66.9 (19.4)	75.2 (24.0)	83.1 (28.4)	87.9 (31.1)	87.2 (30.7)	79.8 (26.6)	69.0 (20.6)	55.6 (13.1)	44.7 (7.1)	66.1 (19.0)
Daily mean °F (°C)	30.9 (−0.6)	35.7 (2.1)	45.0 (7.2)	55.3 (12.9)	64.9 (18.3)	73.3 (22.9)	77.7 (25.4)	76.5 (24.7)	68.3 (20.2)	57.6 (14.2)	45.1 (7.3)	35.3 (1.8)	55.5 (13.0)
Mean daily minimum °F (°C)	20.7 (−6.3)	24.8 (−4.0)	33.7 (0.9)	43.7 (6.5)	54.6 (12.6)	63.5 (17.5)	67.5 (19.7)	65.8 (18.8)	56.7 (13.7)	46.1 (7.8)	34.6 (1.4)	25.9 (−3.4)	44.8 (7.1)
Average precipitation inches (mm)	2.40 (61)	2.21 (56)	3.32 (84)	4.79 (122)	4.93 (125)	4.15 (105)	3.99 (101)	3.69 (94)	3.86 (98)	3.34 (85)	3.64 (92)	2.64 (67)	42.96 (1,090)
Average snowfall inches (cm)	2.9 (7.4)	2.3 (5.8)	0.6 (1.5)	0.0 (0.0)	0.0 (0.0)	0.0 (0.0)	0.0 (0.0)	0.0 (0.0)	0.0 (0.0)	0.0 (0.0)	0.4 (1.0)	1.4 (3.6)	7.6 (19.3)
Source: NOAA

== Demographics ==
Historical population
Census	Pop.	Note	%±
1900	264		—
1910	428		62.1%
1920	487		13.8%
1930	539		10.7%
1940	486		−9.8%
1950	595		22.4%
1960	694		16.6%
1970	741		6.8%
1980	852		15.0%
1990	650		−23.7%
2000	605		−6.9%
2010	736		21.7%
2020	703		−4.5%
U.S. Decennial Census

=== 2010 census ===
As of the census of 2010, there were 736 people, 287 households, and 185 families living in the city. The population density was 836.4 inhabitants per square mile (322.9/km^{2}). There were 347 housing units at an average density of 394.3 per square mile (152.2/km^{2}). The racial makeup of the city was 95.8% White, 0.8% African American, 1.1% Native American, 0.7% from other races, and 1.6% from two or more races. Hispanic or Latino of any race were 3.0% of the population.

There were 287 households, of which 40.4% had children under the age of 18 living with them, 42.2% were married couples living together, 15.3% had a female householder with no husband present, 7.0% had a male householder with no wife present, and 35.5% were non-families. 31.0% of all households were made up of individuals, and 14.3% had someone living alone who was 65 years of age or older. The average household size was 2.56 and the average family size was 3.16.

The median age in the city was 31.4 years. 31.4% of residents were under the age of 18; 8.8% were between the ages of 18 and 24; 24.7% were from 25 to 44; 22.4% were from 45 to 64; and 12.8% were 65 years of age or older. The gender makeup of the city was 48.6% male and 51.4% female.

=== 2000 census ===
As of the census of 2000, there were 605 people, 268 households, and 161 families living in the city. The population density was 672.8 inhabitants per square mile (259.8/km^{2}). There were 327 housing units at an average density of 363.7 per square mile (140.4/km^{2}). The racial makeup of the city was 97.85% White, 0.33% African American, 0.66% Native American, 0.17% Asian, 0.33% from other races, and 0.66% from two or more races. Hispanic or Latino of any race were 1.32% of the population.

There were 268 households, out of which 30.2% had children under the age of 18 living with them, 41.0% were married couples living together, 13.4% had a female householder with no husband present, and 39.9% were non-families. 35.8% of all households were made up of individuals, and 21.3% had someone living alone who was 65 years of age or older. The average household size was 2.26 and the average family size was 2.91.

In the city, the population was spread out, with 25.3% under the age of 18, 9.8% from 18 to 24, 25.5% from 25 to 44, 20.5% from 45 to 64, and 19.0% who were 65 years of age or older. The median age was 36 years. For every 100 females, there were 86.7 males. For every 100 females age 18 and over, there were 79.4 males.

The median income for a household in the city was $30,033, and the median income for a family was $28,750. Males had a median income of $25,500 versus $16,875 for females. The per capita income for the city was $12,918. About 13.6% of families and 17.8% of the population were below the poverty line, including 23.1% of those under age 18 and 18.1% of those age 65 or over.

== Education ==
The Iberia R-V School District operates an elementary school, a junior high school, and a high school. Junior high and elementary are linked in two buildings, and high school operates primarily in the annex.

Iberia has a public library, a branch of the Heartland Regional Library System.
