= Miller County, Missouri =

County in Missouri, United States

- County
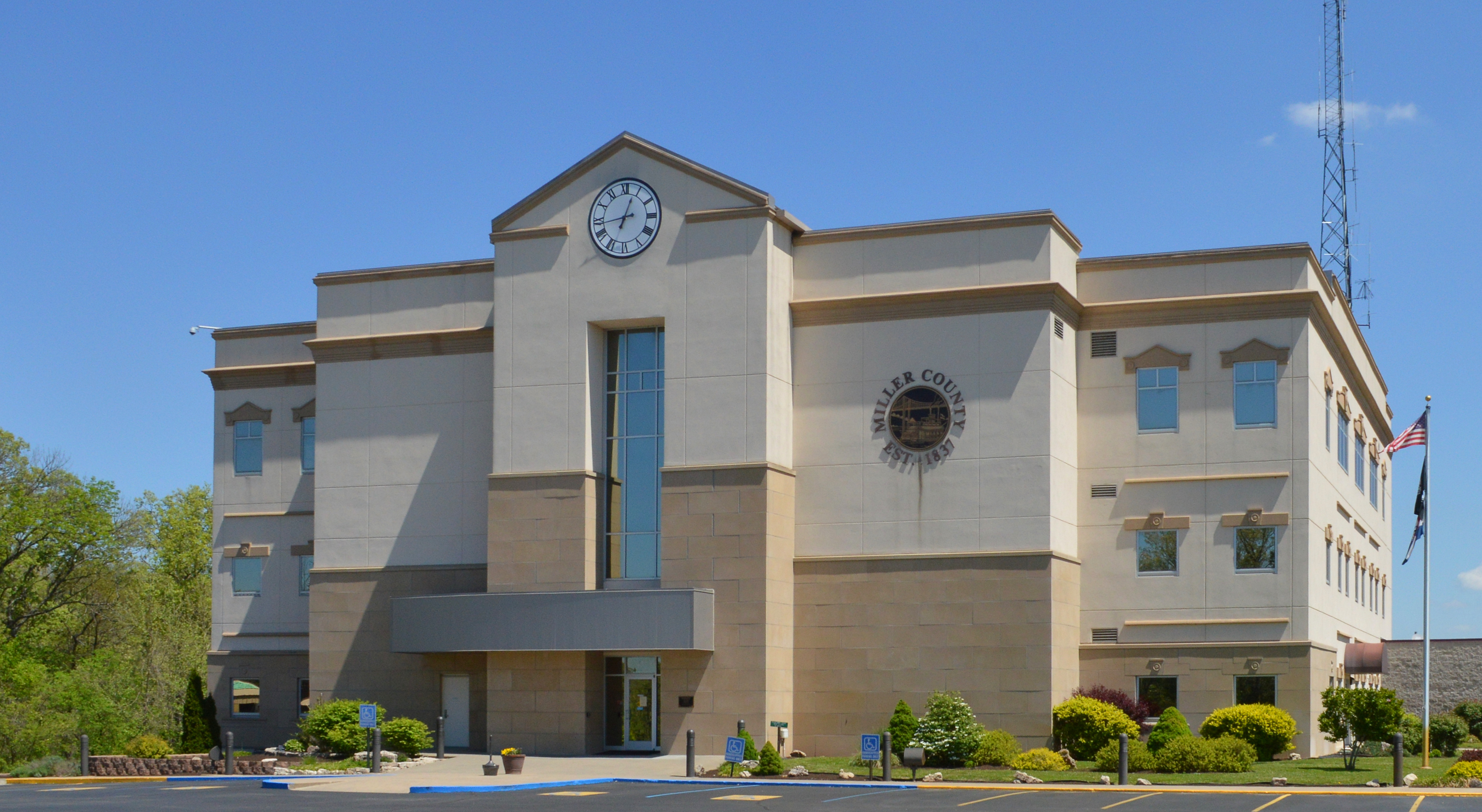
- The Miller County Courthouse in Tuscumbia

- Location within the U.S. state of Missouri
- Coordinates: 38°13′N 92°26′W
- Country: United States
- State: Missouri
- Founded: February 6, 1837
- Named for: John Miller
- Seat: Tuscumbia
- Largest city: Eldon

Area
  - Total: 600 sq mi (1,600 km^{2})
  - Land: 593 sq mi (1,540 km^{2})
  - Water: 7.4 sq mi (19 km^{2}) 1.2%

Population (2020)
  - Total: 24,722
  - Estimate (2025): 25,817 ▲
  - Density: 41.7/sq mi (16.1/km^{2})
- Time zone: UTC−6 (Central)
  - Summer (DST): UTC−5 (CDT)
- Congressional district: 3rd
- Website: millercountymo.gov

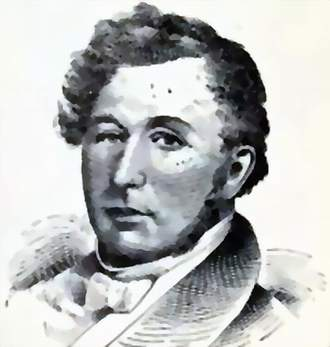
John Miller, the county's namesake

Miller County is a county located in the northern Ozarks region of the U.S. state of Missouri. As of the 2020 United States census, the population was 24,722. Its county seat is Tuscumbia. The county was organized February 6, 1837, and named for John Miller, former U.S. Representative and Governor of Missouri.

== Geography ==
According to the U.S. Census Bureau, the county has a total area of 600 square miles (1,600 km^{2}), of which 593 square miles (1,540 km^{2}) is land and 7.4 square miles (19 km^{2}) (1.2%) is water.

=== Adjacent counties ===
- Moniteau County (north)
- Cole County (northeast)
- Osage County (northeast)
- Maries County (east)
- Pulaski County (south)
- Camden County (southwest)
- Morgan County (west)

=== Major highways ===
- U.S. Route 54
- Route 17
- Route 42
- Route 52
- Route 87
- Route 134
- Route 242

== Demographics ==
Historical population
Census	Pop.	Note	%±
1840	2,282		—
1850	3,834		68.0%
1860	6,812		77.7%
1870	6,616		−2.9%
1880	9,805		48.2%
1890	14,162		44.4%
1900	15,187		7.2%
1910	16,717		10.1%
1920	15,567		−6.9%
1930	16,728		7.5%
1940	14,798		−11.5%
1950	13,734		−7.2%
1960	13,800		0.5%
1970	15,026		8.9%
1980	18,532		23.3%
1990	20,700		11.7%
2000	23,564		13.8%
2010	24,748		5.0%
2020	24,722		−0.1%
2025 (est.)	25,817	▲	4.4%
U.S. Decennial Census; 1790-1960 1900-1990; 1990-2000 2010-2015

=== 2020 census ===
As of the 2020 census, the county had a population of 24,722. The median age was 41.3 years. 23.6% of residents were under the age of 18 and 19.5% of residents were 65 years of age or older. For every 100 females there were 97.1 males, and for every 100 females age 18 and over there were 95.9 males age 18 and over.

The racial makeup of the county was 93.4% White, 0.5% Black or African American, 0.5% American Indian and Alaska Native, 0.3% Asian, 0.1% Native Hawaiian and Pacific Islander, 0.5% from some other race, and 4.7% from two or more races. Hispanic or Latino residents of any race comprised 1.9% of the population.

23.5% of residents lived in urban areas, while 76.5% lived in rural areas.

There were 9,867 households in the county, of which 29.8% had children under the age of 18 living with them and 23.3% had a female householder with no spouse or partner present. About 27.5% of all households were made up of individuals and 13.3% had someone living alone who was 65 years of age or older.

There were 12,476 housing units, of which 20.9% were vacant. Among occupied housing units, 74.1% were owner-occupied and 25.9% were renter-occupied. The homeowner vacancy rate was 2.1% and the rental vacancy rate was 9.0%.

Miller County, Missouri – Racial and ethnic composition Note: the US Census treats Hispanic/Latino as an ethnic category. This table excludes Latinos from the racial categories and assigns them to a separate category. Hispanics/Latinos may be of any race.
Race / Ethnicity (NH = Non-Hispanic)	Pop 1980	Pop 1990	Pop 2000	Pop 2010	Pop 2020	% 1980	% 1990	% 2000	% 2010	% 2020
White alone (NH)	18,301	20,469	22,934	23,762	22,908	98.75%	98.88%	97.33%	96.02%	92.66%
Black or African American alone (NH)	8	23	63	95	117	0.04%	0.11%	0.27%	0.38%	0.47%
Native American or Alaska Native alone (NH)	67	83	100	123	113	0.36%	0.40%	0.42%	0.50%	0.46%
Asian alone (NH)	25	21	27	69	64	0.13%	0.10%	0.11%	0.28%	0.26%
Native Hawaiian or Pacific Islander alone (NH)	x	x	5	36	24	x	x	0.02%	0.15%	0.10%
Other race alone (NH)	14	3	15	4	45	0.08%	0.01%	0.06%	0.02%	0.18%
Mixed race or Multiracial (NH)	x	x	189	316	985	x	x	0.80%	1.28%	3.98%
Hispanic or Latino (any race)	117	101	231	343	466	0.63%	0.49%	0.98%	1.39%	1.88%
Total	18,532	20,700	23,564	24,748	24,722	100.00%	100.00%	100.00%	100.00%	100.00%

=== 2000 census ===
As of the census of 2000, there were 23,564 people, 9,284 households, and 6,443 families residing in the county. The population density was 40 people per square mile (15 people/km^{2}). There were 11,263 housing units at an average density of 19 units per square mile (7.3/km^{2}). The racial makeup of the county was 97.99% White, 0.28% Black or African American, 0.46% Native American, 0.13% Asian, 0.02% Pacific Islander, 0.29% from other races, and 0.84% from two or more races. Approximately 0.98% of the population were Hispanic or Latino of any race.

There were 9,284 households, out of which 32.60% had children under the age of 18 living with them, 56.00% were married couples living together, 9.20% had a female householder with no husband present, and 30.60% were non-families. 26.10% of all households were made up of individuals, and 11.90% had someone living alone who was 65 years of age or older. The average household size was 2.50 and the average family size was 3.00.

In the county, the population was spread out, with 26.30% under the age of 18, 8.40% from 18 to 24, 27.40% from 25 to 44, 22.70% from 45 to 64, and 15.30% who were 65 years of age or older. The median age was 37 years. For every 100 females there were 97.30 males. For every 100 females age 18 and over, there were 93.70 males.

The median income for a household in the county was $30,977, and the median income for a family was $36,770. Males had a median income of $26,225 versus $18,903 for females. The per capita income for the county was $15,144. About 10.80% of families and 14.20% of the population were below the poverty line, including 19.30% of those under age 18 and 14.70% of those age 65 or over.

== Education ==
=== Public schools ===
- Eldon R-I School District – Eldon
  - South Elementary School (PK-03)
  - Eldon Upper Elementary School (04-06)
  - Eldon Middle School (07-08)
  - Eldon High School (09-12)
- Iberia R-V School District – Iberia
  - Iberia Elementary School (PK-06)
  - Iberia High School (07-12)
- Miller County R-III School District – Tuscumbia
  - Miller County Elementary School (K-08)
  - Tuscumbia High School (09-12)
- School of the Osage – Lake Ozark
  - Leland O. Mills Elementary School (PK-02)
  - Osage Upper Elementary School (03-05)
  - Osage Middle School (06-08)
  - Osage High School (09-12)
- St. Elizabeth R-IV School District – St. Elizabeth
  - St. Elizabeth Elementary School (K-06)
  - St. Elizabeth High School (07-12)

=== Private schools ===
- Lakeview Christian Academy – Lake Ozark (K-10) – Nondenominational Christian
- Our Lady of the Snows School – Eugene (K-08) – Roman Catholic
- Eldon Montessori Children's House – Eldon (PK-K) – Nonsectarian
- The King's Academy - Christ the King Lutheran School – Lake Ozark (Preschool-8) – Lutheran

=== Public libraries ===
- Heartland Regional Library System

== Communities ==
=== Cities and towns ===
- Bagnell
- Brumley
- Eldon (largest city)
- Iberia
- Lake Ozark
- Lakeside
- Olean
- Osage Beach
- St. Elizabeth
- Tuscumbia (county seat)

=== Census-designated place ===
- Aurora Springs

=== Unincorporated communities ===
- Atwell
- Brays
- Capps
- Etterville
- Faith
- Hoecker
- Kaiser
- Keethtown
- Marys Home
- Pleasant Mount
- Rocky Mount
- Saint Anthony
- Spring Garden
- Ulman
- Watkins
- West Aurora

== Government and politics ==
=== Political culture ===
Like most counties in rural western Missouri, Miller County is very Republican. It hasn't supported a Democrat for president since Franklin D. Roosevelt in 1932. The only other time it supported a Democrat in the 20th century was in 1912, when Woodrow Wilson carried the county against a mortally divided GOP. Lyndon B. Johnson is the last Democrat to garner even 40 percent of the county's vote.

Underlining how Republican the county has been over the years, it rejected native son Harry Truman in 1944 as Roosevelt's running mate, and when he headed the ticket himself in 1

=== Local ===
The Republican Party completely controls politics at the local level in Miller County. Republicans currently hold all of the elected positions in the county.

Miller County, Missouri

Elected countywide officials
Assessor	Joseph Cochran	Republican
Circuit Clerk	Sheila Curtman	Republican
County Clerk	Clinton Jenkins	Republican
Collector	Jody Vance	Republican
Commissioner (presiding)	Kevin Cardwell	Republican
Commissioner (district 1)	Don Abbett	Republican
Commissioner (district 2)	Travis Rowden	Republican
Coroner	Caleb Shelton	Republican
Prosecuting Attorney	Matthew Howard	Republican
Public Administrator	Theresa Lupardus	Republican
Recorder	Kathy Plemmons	Republican
Sheriff	Louis Gregoire	Republican
Surveyor	Rick Wilson	Republican
Treasurer	Phil Lawson	Republican

=== State ===
==== Gubernatorial ====
Past Gubernatorial Elections Results
Year	Republican	Democratic	Third Parties
2024	82.84% 10,638	14.76% 1,893	2.40% 308
2020	82.82% 10,212	15.31% 1,888	1.87% 231
2016	69.65% 7,924	27.37% 3,114	2.98% 339
2012	59.85% 6,547	36.67% 4,012	3.48% 381
2008	55.86% 6,414	42.31% 4,858	1.84% 211
2004	67.76% 7,331	31.15% 3,370	1.09% 118
2000	57.12% 5,343	39.38% 3,684	3.50% 327
1996	45.28% 3,984	51.76% 4,554	2.97% 261

==== Missouri House of Representatives ====
Miller County is divided into four legislative districts in the Missouri House of Representatives, all of which are represented by Republicans.

- District 58 — David Wood (R-Versailles). Consists of the city of Eldon.

Missouri House of Representatives — District 58 — Miller County (2020)
Party	Candidate	Votes	%	±%
Republican	Willard Haley	2,307	98.67%	
	Write In	31	1.33%	

Missouri House of Representatives — District 58 — Miller County (2016)
Party	Candidate	Votes	%	±%
Republican	David Wood	1,940	83.40%	−16.60
Democratic	Travis Maupin	386	16.60%	+16.60

Missouri House of Representatives — District 58 — Miller County (2014)
Party	Candidate	Votes	%	±%
Republican	David Wood	1,021	100.00%	

Missouri House of Representatives — District 58 — Miller County (2012)
Party	Candidate	Votes	%	±%
Republican	David Wood	2,067	100.00%	

- District 59 — Mike Bernskoetter (R-Jefferson City). Consists of the community of Olean.

Missouri House of Representatives — District 59 — Miller County (2020)
Party	Candidate	Votes	%	±%
Republican	Rudy Veit	1,056	99.15%	
	Write In	9	0.85%	

Missouri House of Representatives — District 59 — Miller County (2016)
Party	Candidate	Votes	%	±%
Republican	Mike Bernskoetter	941	100.00%	+13.18%

Missouri House of Representatives — District 59 — Miller County (2014)
Party	Candidate	Votes	%	±%
Republican	Mike Bernskoetter	428	86.82%	+8.73
Constitution	Michael Eberle	65	13.18%	+13.18

Missouri House of Representatives — District 59 — Miller County (2012)
Party	Candidate	Votes	%	±%
Republican	Mike Bernskoetter	802	78.09%	
Democratic	Vonnieta E. Trickey	225	21.91%	

- District 62 — Tom Hurst (R-Meta). Consists of the community of St. Elizabeth.

Missouri House of Representatives — District 62 — Miller County (2020)
Party	Candidate	Votes	%	±%
Republican	Bruce Sassmann	877	89.95%	
Democratic	Nancy Ragan	97	9.95%	

Missouri House of Representatives — District 62 — Miller County (2016)
Party	Candidate	Votes	%	±%
Republican	Tom Hurst	878	100.00%	

Missouri House of Representatives — District 62 — Miller County (2014)
Party	Candidate	Votes	%	±%
Republican	Tom Hurst	450	100.00%	+23.17

Missouri House of Representatives — District 62 — Miller County (2012)
Party	Candidate	Votes	%	±%
Republican	Tom Hurst	703	76.83%	
Democratic	Greg Stratman	212	23.17%	

- District 124 — Rocky Miller (R-Lake Ozark). Consists of most of the county, including the communities of Bagnell, Brumley, Iberia, Kaiser, Lake Ozark, Lakeside, Osage Beach, Tuscumbia, and Ulman.

Missouri House of Representatives — District 124 — Miller County (2020)
Party	Candidate	Votes	%	±%
Republican	Lisa Thomas	6,449	98.90%	
	Write In	72	1.10%	

Missouri House of Representatives — District 124 — Miller County (2016)
Party	Candidate	Votes	%	±%
Republican	Rocky Miller	6,140	100.00%	

Missouri House of Representatives — District 124 — Miller County (2014)
Party	Candidate	Votes	%	±%
Republican	Rocky Miller	2,842	100.00%	

Missouri House of Representatives — District 124 — Miller County (2012)
Party	Candidate	Votes	%	±%
Republican	Rocky Miller	5,717	100.00%	

==== Missouri Senate ====
All of Miller County is a part of Missouri's 6th District in the Missouri Senate and is currently represented by Mike Kehoe (R-Jefferson City).

Missouri Senate — District 6 — Miller County (2014)
Party	Candidate	Votes	%	±%
Republican	Mike Kehoe	4,547	85.37%	
Democratic	Mollie Kristen Freebairn	779	14.63%	

=== Federal ===
==== US Senate ====
U.S. Senate — Missouri — Miller County (2016)
Party	Candidate	Votes	%	±%
Republican	Roy Blunt	7,760	68.47%	+12.45
Democratic	Jason Kander	3,032	26.75%	−9.27
Libertarian	Jonathan Dine	303	2.67%	−5.29
Green	Johnathan McFarland	114	1.01%	+1.01
Constitution	Fred Ryman	124	1.09%	+1.09

U.S. Senate — Missouri — Miller County (2012)
Party	Candidate	Votes	%	±%
Republican	Todd Akin	6,084	56.02%	
Democratic	Claire McCaskill	3,912	36.02%	
Libertarian	Jonathan Dine	865	7.96%	

==== US House of Representatives ====
All of Miller County is included in Missouri's 3rd Congressional District and is currently represented by Blaine Luetkemeyer (R-St. Elizabeth) in the U.S. House of Representatives.

U.S. House of Representatives — Missouri’s 3rd Congressional District — Miller County (2016)
Party	Candidate	Votes	%	±%
Republican	Blaine Luetkemeyer	9,228	82.06%	−0.69
Democratic	Kevin Miller	1,641	14.59%	+0.94
Libertarian	Dan Hogan	278	2.47%	−1.13
Constitution	Doanita Simmons	99	0.88%	+0.88

U.S. House of Representatives — Missouri's 3rd Congressional District — Miller County (2014)
Party	Candidate	Votes	%	±%
Republican	Blaine Luetkemeyer	4,436	82.75%	+3.62
Democratic	Courtney Denton	732	13.65%	−3.57
Libertarian	Steven Hedrick	193	3.60%	−0.05

U.S. House of Representatives — Missouri's 3rd Congressional District — Miller County (2012)
Party	Candidate	Votes	%	±%
Republican	Blaine Luetkemeyer	8,548	79.13%	
Democratic	Eric C. Mayer	1,860	17.22%	
Libertarian	Steven Wilson	394	3.65%	

==== Presidential ====
United States presidential election results for Miller County, Missouri
Year	Republican		Democratic		Third party(ies)	
Year	No.	%	No.	%	No.	%
1888	1,596	56.06%	1,195	41.97%	56	1.97%
1892	1,497	51.23%	1,076	36.82%	349	11.94%
1896	1,707	50.00%	1,694	49.62%	13	0.38%
1900	1,796	53.63%	1,493	44.58%	60	1.79%
1904	1,959	57.75%	1,351	39.83%	82	2.42%
1908	2,016	57.47%	1,393	39.71%	99	2.82%
1912	1,240	38.98%	1,257	39.52%	684	21.50%
1916	1,862	55.52%	1,395	41.59%	97	2.89%
1920	3,555	64.94%	1,833	33.49%	86	1.57%
1924	3,011	56.16%	1,962	36.60%	388	7.24%
1928	3,379	62.85%	1,979	36.81%	18	0.33%
1932	2,615	40.64%	3,776	58.68%	44	0.68%
1936	3,607	50.90%	3,436	48.49%	43	0.61%
1940	3,971	55.87%	3,113	43.80%	23	0.32%
1944	3,609	61.69%	2,229	38.10%	12	0.21%
1948	3,088	55.03%	2,514	44.80%	9	0.16%
1952	4,237	63.42%	2,426	36.31%	18	0.27%
1956	4,085	61.71%	2,535	38.29%	0	0.00%
1960	4,482	63.43%	2,584	36.57%	0	0.00%
1964	3,784	56.97%	2,858	43.03%	0	0.00%
1968	4,425	64.88%	1,727	25.32%	668	9.79%
1972	5,682	78.05%	1,598	21.95%	0	0.00%
1976	4,095	59.64%	2,739	39.89%	32	0.47%
1980	5,560	67.93%	2,469	30.16%	156	1.91%
1984	6,706	76.55%	2,054	23.45%	0	0.00%
1988	5,662	68.82%	2,555	31.06%	10	0.12%
1992	4,175	44.01%	2,905	30.62%	2,407	25.37%
1996	4,387	50.20%	3,110	35.59%	1,242	14.21%
2000	5,945	63.54%	3,217	34.38%	194	2.07%
2004	7,797	71.99%	2,959	27.32%	75	0.69%
2008	7,797	67.43%	3,553	30.73%	213	1.84%
2012	8,099	73.31%	2,651	24.00%	298	2.70%
2016	9,285	80.87%	1,750	15.24%	447	3.89%
2020	10,176	82.18%	2,038	16.46%	168	1.36%
2024	10,826	83.21%	2,067	15.89%	118	0.91%

=== Missouri presidential preference primary (2008) ===
Former Governor Mike Huckabee (R-Arkansas) received more votes, a total of 1,406, than any candidate from either party in Miller County during the 2008 presidential primary.

== See also ==
- National Register of Historic Places listings in Miller County, Missouri
