= Eldon, Missouri =

City in Missouri, United States

- City
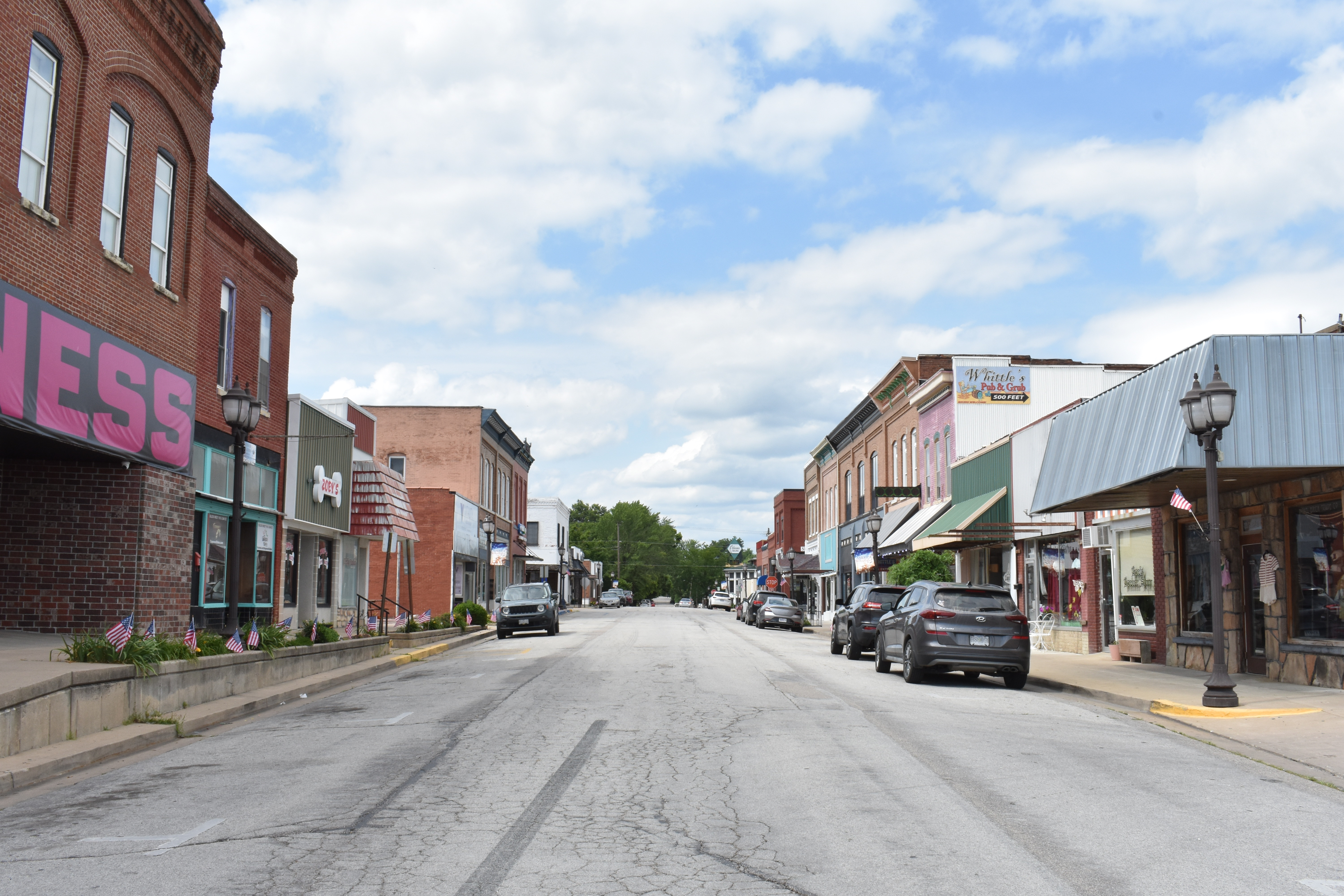
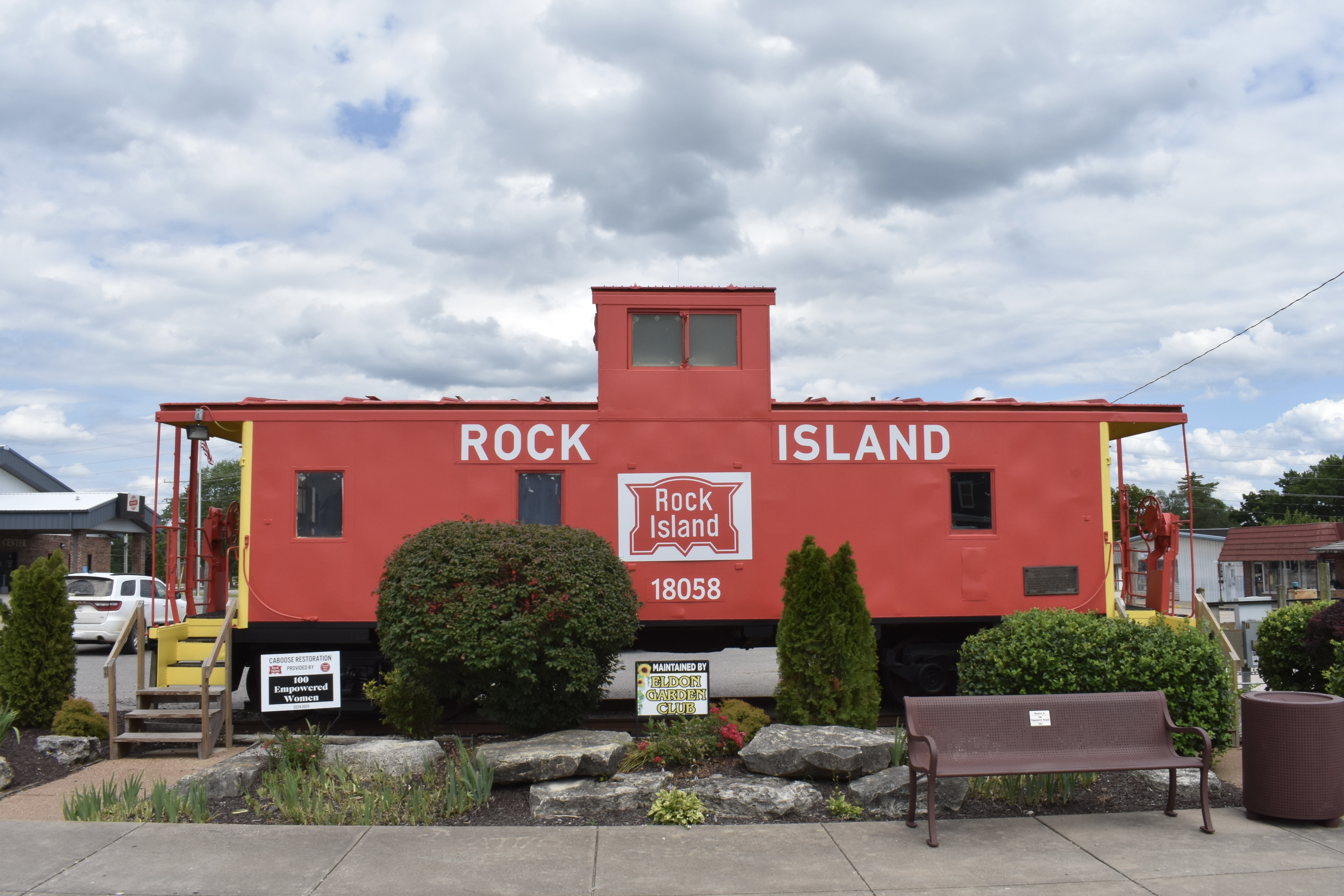
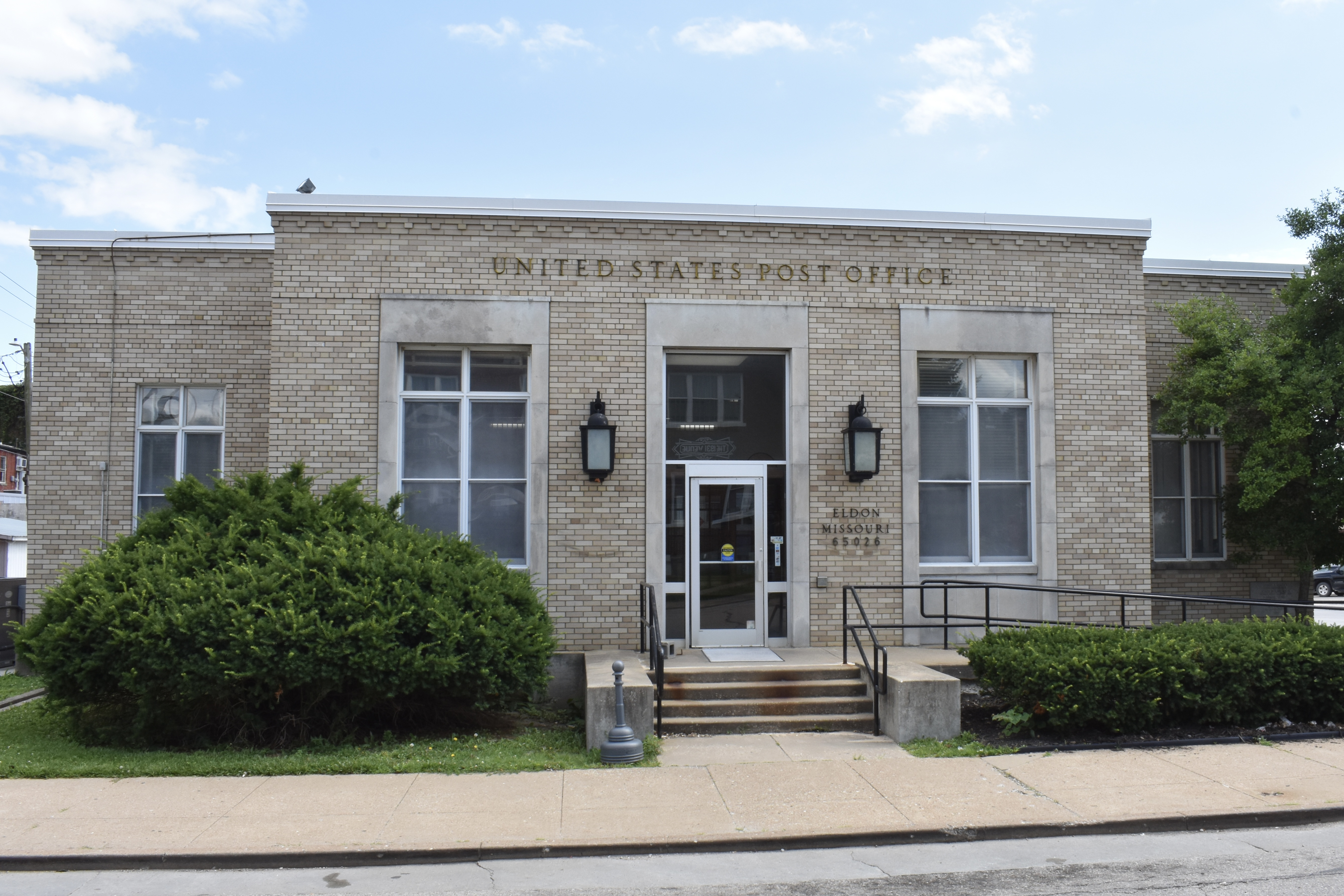
- Downtown Rock Island Railroad Caboose Post Office

- Location in Miller County and the state of Missouri
- Coordinates: 38°21′04″N 92°34′36″W
- Country: United States
- State: Missouri
- County: Miller
- Founded: 1882
- Incorporated: 1904

Government
  - Mayor: Trevor Vernon

Area
  - Total: 3.56 sq mi (9.21 km^{2})
  - Land: 3.56 sq mi (9.21 km^{2})
  - Water: 0 sq mi (0.00 km^{2})
- Elevation: 925 ft (282 m)

Population (2020)
  - Total: 4,416
  - Estimate (2023): 4,602
  - Density: 1,268.4/sq mi (489.7/km^{2})
- Time zone: UTC-6 (Central (CST))
  - Summer (DST): UTC-5 (CDT)
- ZIP code: 65026
- Area code: 573
- FIPS code: 29-21484
- GNIS feature ID: 2394638
- Website: www.eldonmo.org

Eldon is a city in Miller County, Missouri, United States, located 30 miles (48 km) southwest of Jefferson City. The population was 4,416 as of the 2020 census.

== History ==
Eldon was platted in 1881, and according to tradition, named after a railroad official. The railroad closed down in 1980 and is proposed to be transformed into the extension of the Rock Island Trail. A post office called Eldon has been in operation since 1881.

=== 2019 tornado ===
On the night of May 22, 2019, a tornado touched down west of Eldon. It came through Eldon damaging many homes and businesses. The same tornado struck Jefferson City later in the evening.

== Geography ==
Eldon is in northwestern Miller County. The city is served by U.S. Route 54 and Missouri Routes 52 and 87. Jefferson City is 30 miles (48 km) to the northeast, while the city of Lake Ozark is 12 miles (19 km) to the south. Bagnell Dam, which forms the Lake of the Ozarks, is 11 miles (18 km) south of Eldon.

According to the U.S. Census Bureau, the city of Eldon has a total area of 3.56 square miles (9.22 km^{2}), all land. The city sits on high ground: the northwest side of the city drains toward South Moreau Creek, part of the Moreau River watershed flowing to the Missouri River, while the northeast side of the city is the source of Blythes Creek, a tributary of South Moreau Creek. The southeast side of Eldon drains into Saline Creek, a tributary of the Osage River, which in turn flows northeastern to the Missouri River.

=== Climate ===
Climate data for Eldon, Missouri (1991–2020 normals, extremes 1896–present)
Month	Jan	Feb	Mar	Apr	May	Jun	Jul	Aug	Sep	Oct	Nov	Dec	Year
Record high °F (°C)	79 (26)	82 (28)	96 (36)	95 (35)	102 (39)	106 (41)	115 (46)	112 (44)	108 (42)	96 (36)	86 (30)	77 (25)	115 (46)
Mean daily maximum °F (°C)	40.4 (4.7)	46.2 (7.9)	56.0 (13.3)	67.1 (19.5)	75.5 (24.2)	84.2 (29.0)	88.6 (31.4)	87.5 (30.8)	79.8 (26.6)	68.8 (20.4)	55.2 (12.9)	45.1 (7.3)	66.2 (19.0)
Daily mean °F (°C)	31.2 (−0.4)	36.0 (2.2)	45.4 (7.4)	56.1 (13.4)	65.4 (18.6)	74.3 (23.5)	78.7 (25.9)	77.2 (25.1)	69.3 (20.7)	58.0 (14.4)	45.5 (7.5)	35.9 (2.2)	56.1 (13.4)
Mean daily minimum °F (°C)	22.1 (−5.5)	25.9 (−3.4)	34.8 (1.6)	45.1 (7.3)	55.4 (13.0)	64.5 (18.1)	68.9 (20.5)	66.9 (19.4)	58.8 (14.9)	47.1 (8.4)	35.8 (2.1)	26.7 (−2.9)	46.0 (7.8)
Record low °F (°C)	−28 (−33)	−28 (−33)	−7 (−22)	10 (−12)	25 (−4)	32 (0)	47 (8)	38 (3)	30 (−1)	17 (−8)	3 (−16)	−25 (−32)	−28 (−33)
Average precipitation inches (mm)	2.28 (58)	2.03 (52)	2.90 (74)	4.97 (126)	5.63 (143)	4.89 (124)	4.39 (112)	4.05 (103)	4.29 (109)	3.78 (96)	3.25 (83)	2.36 (60)	44.82 (1,138)
Average precipitation days (≥ 0.01 in)	5.5	5.2	7.8	8.3	10.2	8.0	6.6	6.6	6.7	6.6	6.6	5.0	83.1
Source: NOAA

== Demographics ==
Historical population
Census	Pop.	Note	%±
1900	379		—
1910	1,999		427.4%
1920	2,636		31.9%
1930	3,171		20.3%
1940	2,590		−18.3%
1950	2,766		6.8%
1960	3,158		14.2%
1970	3,520		11.5%
1980	4,342		23.4%
1990	4,419		1.8%
2000	4,895		10.8%
2010	4,567		−6.7%
2020	4,416		−3.3%
2024 (est.)	4,602		4.2%
U.S. Decennial Census

=== 2020 census ===
As of the 2020 census, Eldon had a population of 4,416. The median age was 40.7 years. 22.3% of residents were under the age of 18 and 22.0% of residents were 65 years of age or older. For every 100 females there were 88.2 males, and for every 100 females age 18 and over there were 85.8 males age 18 and over.

98.7% of residents lived in urban areas, while 1.3% lived in rural areas.

There were 1,884 households in Eldon, of which 27.3% had children under the age of 18 living in them. Of all households, 37.0% were married-couple households, 19.4% were households with a male householder and no spouse or partner present, and 35.0% were households with a female householder and no spouse or partner present. About 37.9% of all households were made up of individuals and 19.3% had someone living alone who was 65 years of age or older.

There were 2,130 housing units, of which 11.5% were vacant. The homeowner vacancy rate was 3.5% and the rental vacancy rate was 6.4%.

Racial composition as of the 2020 census
Race	Number	Percent
White	4,040	91.5%
Black or African American	27	0.6%
American Indian and Alaska Native	25	0.6%
Asian	24	0.5%
Native Hawaiian and Other Pacific Islander	8	0.2%
Some other race	36	0.8%
Two or more races	256	5.8%
Hispanic or Latino (of any race)	105	2.4%

=== 2010 census ===
As of the census of 2010, there were 4,567 people, 1,984 households, and 1,158 families living in the city. The population density was 1,282.9 inhabitants per square mile (495.3/km^{2}). There were 2,242 housing units at an average density of 629.8 per square mile (243.2/km^{2}). The racial makeup of the city was 95.9% White, 0.5% African American, 0.5% Native American, 0.4% Asian, 0.3% Pacific Islander, 0.4% from other races, and 1.9% from two or more races. Hispanic or Latino of any race were 1.4% of the population.

There were 1,984 households, of which 31.0% had children under the age of 18 living with them, 38.4% were married couples living together, 14.6% had a female householder with no husband present, 5.4% had a male householder with no wife present, and 41.6% were non-families. 36.8% of all households were made up of individuals, and 17.4% had someone living alone who was 65 years of age or older. The average household size was 2.27 and the average family size was 2.94.

The median age in the city was 38.7 years. 24.7% of residents were under the age of 18; 7.7% were between the ages of 18 and 24; 24.4% were from 25 to 44; 24.1% were from 45 to 64; and 19.1% were 65 years of age or older. The gender makeup of the city was 47.0% male and 53.0% female.

=== 2000 census ===
As of the census of 2000, there were 4,895 people, 2,194 households, and 1,270 families living in the city. The population density was 1,450.2 inhabitants per square mile (559.9/km^{2}). There were 2,396 housing units at an average density of 709.8 per square mile (274.1/km^{2}). The racial makeup of the city was 98.14% White, 0.33% African American, 0.31% Native American, 0.16% Asian, 0.31% from other races, and 0.76% from two or more races. Hispanic or Latino of any race were 1.16% of the population.

There were 2,194 households, out of which 26.5% had children under the age of 18 living with them, 41.8% were married couples living together, 12.5% had a female householder with no husband present, and 42.1% were non-families. 38.1% of all households were made up of individuals, and 20.6% had someone living alone who was 65 years of age or older. The average household size was 2.18 and the average family size was 2.88.

In the city, the population was spread out, with 23.2% under the age of 18, 8.7% from 18 to 24, 24.5% from 25 to 44, 20.8% from 45 to 64, and 22.7% who were 65 years of age or older. The median age was 40 years. For every 100 females, there were 83.1 males. For every 100 females age 18 and over, there were 75.6 males.

The median income for a household in the city was $27,103, and the median income for a family was $34,621. Males had a median income of $27,818 versus $17,690 for females. The per capita income for the city was $15,015. 15.8% of the population and 12.0% of families were below the poverty line. Out of the total population, 22.5% of those under the age of 18 and 16.4% of those 65 and older were living below the poverty line.

== Events ==
Since 1987, Eldon hosts a Turkey Festival held every year typically on the last Saturday of September.

== Education ==
Education in the city of Eldon is provided by two elementary schools, one middle school and one high school. It also includes the Eldon Career Center, which provides training in many technical fields. Eldon has a public library, a branch of the Heartland Regional Library System.

In 1977, the Eldon school board banned the American Heritage Dictionary from junior high bookshelves because the dictionary contained profanity.

== Popular culture ==
The television show Petticoat Junction, which aired from 1963 to 1970, was based on the Burris Hotel that existed in this small railroad town in the Midwest. Paul Henning, the producer and creator of the show, was married to the granddaughter of the owner of the hotel and often visited.

== Notable people ==
- Christian Cantwell, 2008 Olympic shot-put silver medalist
- Lloyd Dane, early NASCAR champion
- Jim Golden, baseball player
- William Mueller, professional wrestler known under the names "Trevor Murdoch" and "Jethro Holiday"
- Harley Race, professional wrestler
