= U.S. Route 54 in Missouri =

Section of U.S. Highway in Missouri

U.S. Route 54
- US 54 highlighted in red

Route information
- Maintained by MoDOT
- Length: 271.508 mi (436.950 km)
- Existed: 1927–present

Major junctions
- West end: US-54 at the Kansas state line near Fort Scott, KS
- I-49 in Nevada; US 65 in Preston; US 50 / US 63 in Jefferson City; I-70 in Kingdom City; US 61 in Bowling Green
- East end: US 54 at the Illinois state line in Louisiana

Location
- Country: United States
- State: Missouri
- Counties: Vernon, Cedar, St. Clair, Hickory, Camden, Miller, Cole, Callaway, Audrain, Ralls, Pike

Highway system
- United States Numbered Highway System; List; Special; Divided; Missouri State Highway System; Interstate; US; State; Supplemental
← Route 53	→ I-55

U.S. Route 54 (US 54) in Missouri is a west-east highway that runs between the Kansas state line in Nevada, Missouri and the Illinois state line in Louisiana, Missouri.

== Route description ==
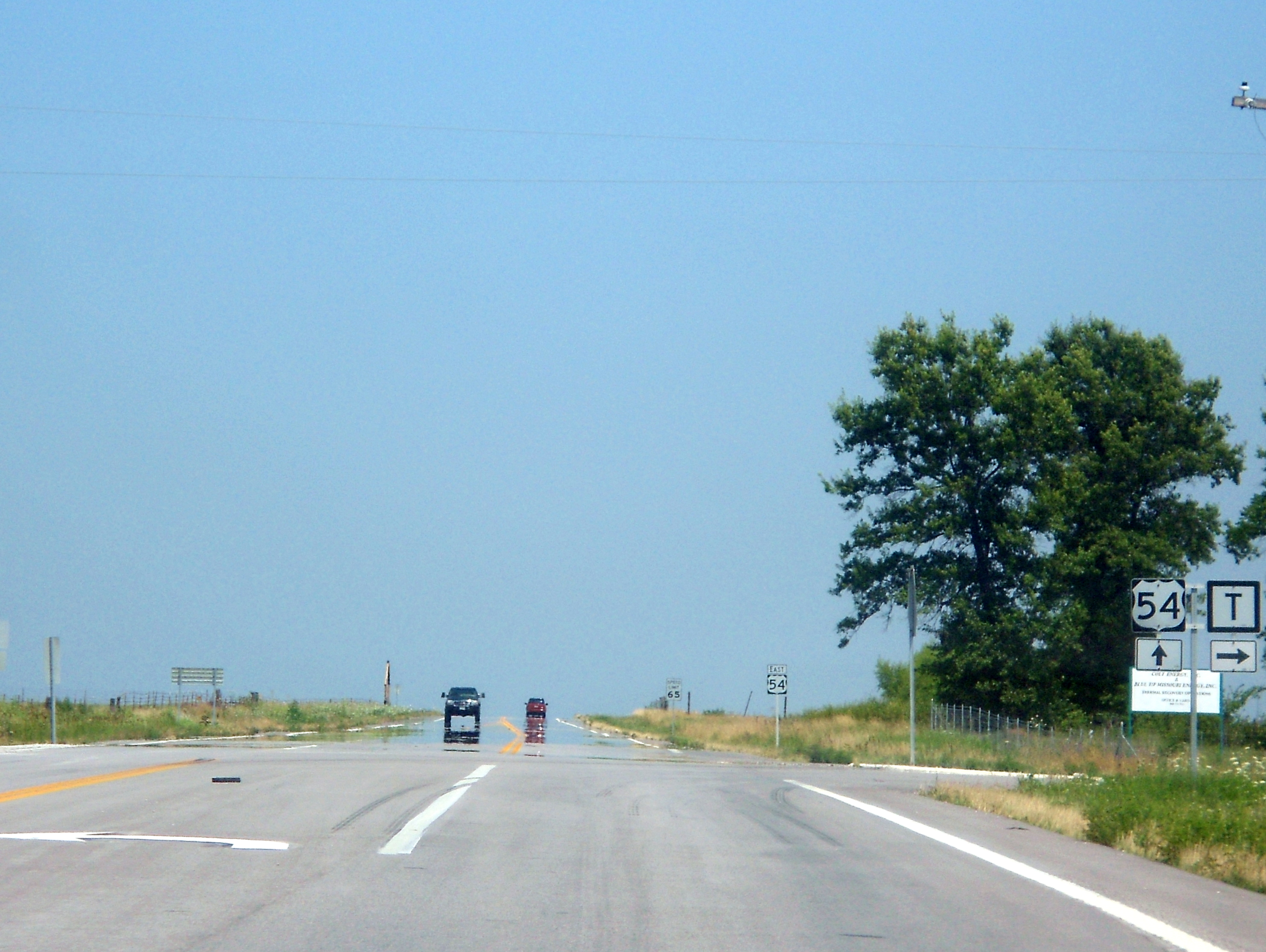
US 54 shortly after entering from Kansas

In Missouri, US 54 runs from the southwest portion of the state to the northeast. It is a major conduit through the Ozarks and is the primary access road to Pomme de Terre Lake and Lake of the Ozarks.

After entering the state from neighboring Kansas, the route moves eastward through many rural towns and communities. It passes through Nevada, where it serves as the main access road to the town's business market. In Nevada, the route intersects with I-49 and US 71 as exits 102A and 102B on I-49/US 71. Here, it also passes by the Nevada Municipal Airport. Moving eastward, the route continues through El Dorado Springs, Collins, Weaubleau, and Wheatland, the latter is home of the Lucas Oil Speedway. It passes through Hermitage and Preston, where it intersects with US 65 at a four-way stop. US 54 intersects northern end of Route 73 then passes through Macks Creek.

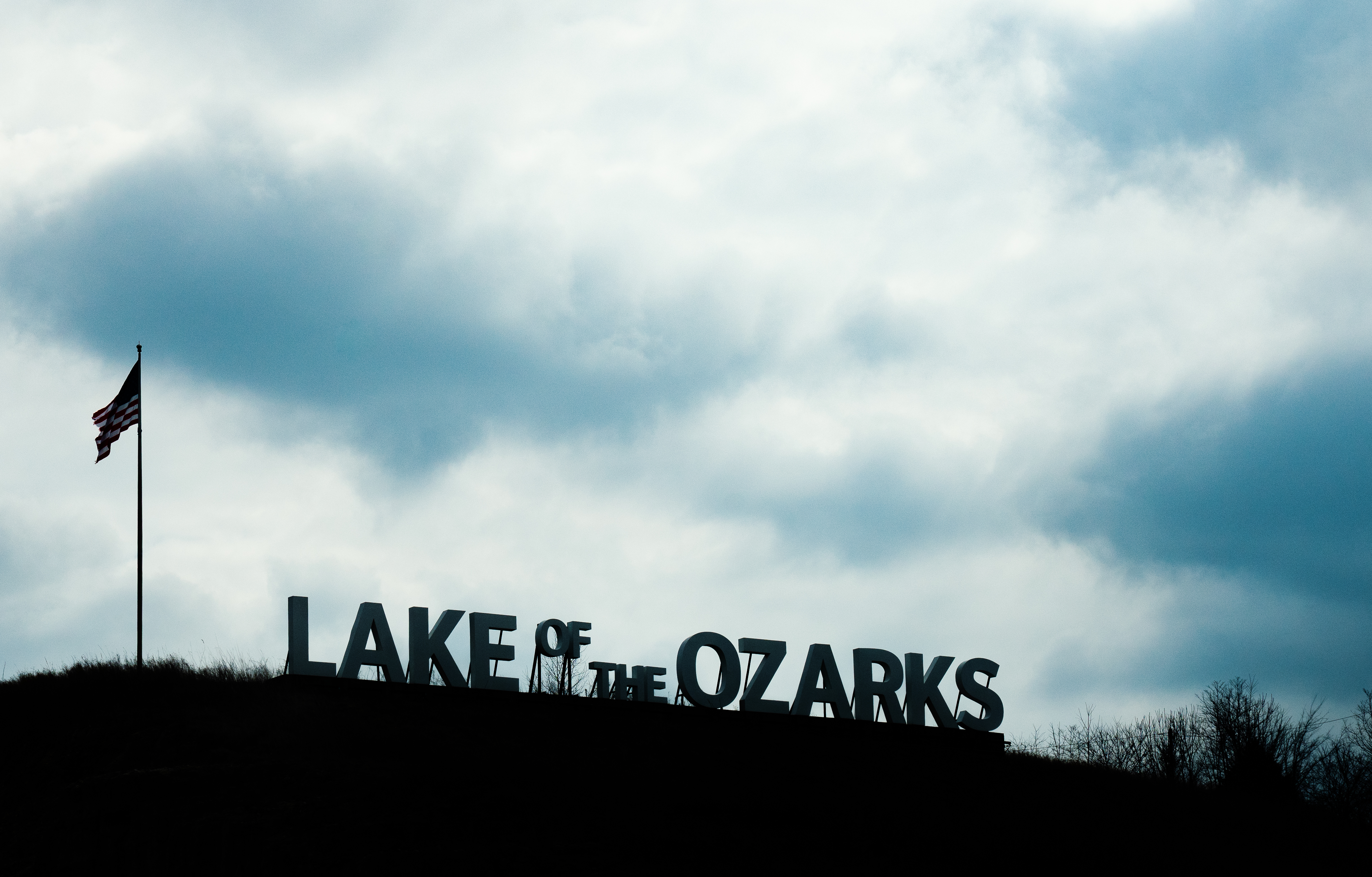
A sign designating the Lake of the Ozarks area, seen from US 54 westbound

The route continues eastward and begins to enter the areas surrounding the Lake of the Ozarks, a popular tourist destination and lake. It first crosses over the lake's Niangua Branch near Ha Ha Tonka State Park. It then passes through Camdenton. In Camdenton, the road intersects with MO 5 and MO 7 at an interchange. These routes provide access to Lebanon and I-44. After leaving Camdenton, the route becomes a four-lane divided highway and remains that way to Mexico. US 54 then passes through Linn Creek and enters Osage Beach. The route continues on a new expressway path initially built in 2010 and 2011. It crosses Lake of the Ozarks a second time on the Grand Glaize Bridge. The route then briefly enters Lake Ozark and Lakeland, although access to these towns is only provided by exits from the highway. A sign seen westbound imitating the Hollywood Sign reads ''Lake of the Ozarks." The route then leaves the Lake of the Ozarks after crossing the Osage River before bypassing Eldon.

US 54 then goes through Jefferson City, where it crosses US 50 and crosses the Missouri River via the Senator Roy Blunt Bridge and briefly overlaps US 63. Just north of the bridge, it splits then leaves the Ozark Plateau before passing through Fulton, crossing I-70 and US 40 at Kingdom City, passes through Auxvasse, then bypassing Mexico where it turns into a two-lane highway. US 54 then turns right and continues on. Future plans call for passing lanes on US 54 from Mexico to the Missouri town of Louisiana. At a roundabout, US 54 picks up a concurrency with Route 19 and then passes through Laddonia. North of Laddonia, US 54 splits from Route 19 before passing just north of Vandalia, bypasses Bowling Green crossing US 61, and ultimately crossing the Mississippi River via the Champ Clark Bridge into Illinois at Louisiana.

US 54 is a part of the National Highway System, a system of highways important to the nation's defense, economy, and mobility.

== History ==
US 54 was originally formed in Missouri after changing from US 26, however the routing went from Cedar County to Polk County, then Dallas County, then into Camden County. In 1932, the highway was rerouted into Saint Clair County and then Hickory County, and paved over.

In Macks Creeks, a well known speed trap existed on US 54 upon entering the town until 1995 when a law named Macks Creek Law was passed.

In the Lake of the Ozarks area, US 54 was rerouted onto a new 4 lane highway in 2010 and another part of US 54 was rerouted in 2011 in the Lake of the Ozarks area. The old US 54 was renamed "Osage Beach Parkway."

The original Champ Clark Bridge opened in 1928. In 2019, a replacement bridge opened and the old one was torn down.

== Junction list ==
All exits are unnumbered.

County	Location	mi	km	Destinations	Notes
Vernon	Coal Township	0.000	0.000	US-54 west – Fort Scott	Continuation into Kansas
Vernon	Coal Township	1.807	2.908	Route T – Swart	
Vernon	Deerfield	5.807	9.345	Route H – Richards	
Vernon	Deerfield Township	9.805	15.780	Route 43 – Moundville, Bronaugh	
Vernon	Nevada	14.071	22.645	Route BB / Route W	
Vernon	Nevada	14.562	23.435	I-49 BL north (Osage Boulevard)	Western end of Loop 49 overlap
Vernon	Nevada	15.056	24.230	I-49 BL south (Austin Boulevard)	Eastern end of Loop 49 overlap
Vernon	Nevada	15.864– 15.883	25.531– 25.561	I-49 / US 71 – Joplin, Kansas City	I-49 exit 102A
Vernon	Walker Township	21.782	35.055	Route C – Walker	
Vernon	Clear Creek Township	27.439	44.159	Route K – Nevada	
Vernon	Clear Creek Township	27.650	44.498	Route AA – Schell City	
Cedar	Box Township	31.173	50.168	Route HH – Virgil City	
Cedar	El Dorado Springs	33.673	54.191	Route 82 – Osceola	
Cedar	El Dorado Springs	34.215	55.064	Route 32 – Stockton	
Cedar	Cedar Township	40.832	65.713	Route 39 / Route DD – Stockton	
St. Clair	Roscoe Township	45.899	73.867	Route K	
St. Clair	Washington Township	50.082	80.599	Route V – Vista	
St. Clair	Washington Township	51.687	83.182	Route J – Stockton	
St. Clair		53.832	86.634	Route PP – Stockton	
St. Clair	Collins	56.578	91.053	Route 13 – Humansville, Osceola	
St. Clair	Collins	56.756	91.340	Route 13 Bus.	
St. Clair		59.466	95.701	Route MM	
Hickory	Weaubleau	61.246	98.566	Route 123 – Humansville	
Hickory	Weaubleau Township	62.857	101.159	Route H	
Hickory	Montgomery Township	65.101	104.770	Route AA	
Hickory	Montgomery Township	67.333	108.362	Route 83 – Warsaw	Western end of Route 83 concurrency
Hickory	Wheatland	71.367	114.854	Route 83 / Route B – Bolivar	Eastern end of Route 83 concurrency
Hickory	Hermitage	76.298	122.790	Route 254 – Galmey	
Hickory	Center Township	77.488	124.705	Route U – Cross Timbers	
Hickory	Preston	82.203	132.293	Route D	
Hickory	Preston	82.697	133.088	US 65 – Urbana, Cross Timbers	
Hickory	Stark Township	85.157	137.047	Route F	
Camden	Branch	93.976	151.240	Route 73 – Tunas, Buffalo	
Camden	Macks Creek	97.224	156.467	Route O / Route W	
Camden	Macks Creek	97.326	156.631	Route N – Climax Springs	
Camden	Russell Township	101.301	163.028	Route J / Route U	
Camden		104.956	168.910	Route AA	
Camden	Niangua Township	107.780	173.455	Route D	Access to Ha Ha Tonka State Park
Camden	Camdenton	110.243	177.419	Route 5 Bus.	
Camden	Camdenton	110.934– 110.954	178.531– 178.563	Route 5 / Route 7 – Sunrise Beach, Lebanon	Interchange
Camden	Linn Creek	112.745	181.445	Route V – Hugo	
Camden	Osage Township	114.074	183.584	Route A – Richland	J-turn intersection
Camden	Osage Township	116.148	186.922	Route Y	Interchange
Camden	Osage Beach	118.900	191.351	Route KK	West end of freeway; access to Grand Glaize-Osage Beach Airport
Camden	Osage Beach	119.607	192.489	Nichols Road	Access to Lake Regional Hospital
Camden	Osage Beach	120.807	194.420	Case Road	Access to Lake of the Ozarks State Park
Camden	Osage Beach	121.571	195.650	Business 54 (Jefferies Road to Osage Beach Parkway)	No westbound entrance
Camden	Osage Beach	121.819	196.049	Grand Glaize Bridge over the Lake of the Ozarks	
Camden	Osage Beach	122.675	197.426	Business 54 (Passover Road to Osage Beach Parkway)	Southern terminus of US 54 Business
Camden	Osage Beach	124.283	200.014	Route 42 / Business 54 (Osage Beach Parkway)	Western terminus of Route 42; access to Lake of the Ozarks State Park
Camden	Osage Beach	124.487	200.342	Creek Cove Lane	Right-in/right-out interchange; westbound exit and entrance only
Miller	Lake Ozark	126.211	203.117	Route 242 (Bagnell Dam Boulevard) To Route 5 – Sunrise Beach	East end of freeway
Miller	Lake Ozark	129.045	207.678	Route W – Bagnell Dam, Lake Ozark	interchange replacing an signalized at-grade intersection opened April 21, 2021
Miller	Franklin Township	130.059	209.310	Route V – Bagnell	
Miller	Franklin Township	136.583	219.809	US 54 Bus. north / Route 52 – Eldon, Tuscumbia	Interchange
Miller	Eldon	139.738	224.887	Route 87 / Route M – Eldon	Interchange; Access to Saline Valley Conservation Area
Miller	Eldon	140.901	226.758	US 54 Bus. – Eldon	Interchange; westbound exit and eastbound entrance
Miller		142.277	228.973	Route FF – Mount Pleasant	
Miller		145.180	233.645	Route MM	
Miller	Saline Township	148.289	238.648	Route AA – Russellville	
Cole	Clark Township	149.156	240.043	Route 17 – Eugene, Fort Leonard Wood	Interchange
Cole	Brazito	155.930	250.945	Route E – Wardsville, Henley	
Cole		157.906	254.125	Route D – Lohman	
Cole		163.155	262.573	Route CC	
Cole	Jefferson City	165.064	265.645	Route 179 / Route B – Wardsville	West end of freeway; access to SSM St. Mary’s Health Center
Cole	Jefferson City	166.231	267.523	Route C (Southwest Boulevard) / Ellis Boulevard	
Cole	Jefferson City	167.231	269.132	Stadium Boulevard / Tanner Bridge Road / Jefferson Street	Access to Lincoln University and Capital Region Medical Center
Cole	Jefferson City	167.271	269.197	Madison Street	Eastbound exit and westbound entrance; access to Business District and Capital Region Medical Center
Cole	Jefferson City	168.188	270.672	US 50 Bus. (Missouri Boulevard)	Access to the Missouri State Capitol
Cole	Jefferson City	168.444	271.084	US 50 / US 63 south – St. Louis, Sedalia	Western end of US 63 concurrency; interchange dubbed as "tri-level"
Cole	Jefferson City	168.534	271.229	McCarty Street	Westbound exit and eastbound entrance
Cole	Jefferson City	168.726	271.538	Main Street	Westbound exit and eastbound entrance; access to the Missouri State Capitol
Cole–Callaway county line	Jefferson City	168.821– 168.950	271.691– 271.899	Jefferson City Bridge over the Missouri River	
Callaway	Jefferson City	169.582	272.916	Route W	Access to Jefferson City Memorial Airport
Callaway	Jefferson City	170.036	273.646	US 63 north / Route 94 – Columbia, Mokane	Eastern end of US 63 concurrency
Callaway	Summit Township	170.965	275.141	Summit Drive	Eastbound exit and westbound entrance
Callaway	Holts Summit	173.995	280.018	Center Street	
Callaway	Holts Summit	175.215	281.981	Route OO / Route AA – Holts Summit	
Callaway	Cedar Township	178.492	287.255	Route AE / Route TT	
Callaway	New Bloomfield	180.184	289.978	Route J (Redwood Drive) / CR 436 – Guthrie	East end of freeway
Callaway	East Fulton Township	184.830	297.455	Route BB – Dixie	
Callaway	Fulton	189.020	304.198	Route H / US 54 Bus. – Fulton	Interchange
Callaway	Fulton	190.944	307.295	Route F – Millersburg, Fulton	Interchange; access to Historic Downtown Fulton, Westminster College, Fulton Medical Center, the National Churchill Museum, the Missouri School for the Deaf, and Little Dixie Lake Conservation Area
Callaway	Fulton	193.017	310.631	Route HH	Interchange; access to William Woods University
Callaway	Fulton	194.510	313.034	US 54 Bus. – Fulton	Interchange; eastbound exit and westbound entrance
Callaway	Kingdom City	198.277– 198.290	319.096– 319.117	I-70 / US 40 – Columbia, St. Louis	I-70 exit 148; future Dumbbell interchange; was going to be Diverging Diamond Interchange (DDI)
Callaway	Kingdom City	198.616	319.641	Route FF	
Callaway	Kingdom City	203.729	327.870	Route T	
Callaway	Auxvasse	204.819	329.624	Route B (Harrison Street) / Route E – Montgomery City, Hatton	Interchange
Audrain	Salt River Township	208.453	335.473	Route HH	
Audrain	Mexico	211.877	340.983	US 54 Bus. / Route 15 north / Route 22 west to Route D – Mexico	Interchange
Audrain	Vandiver	216.380	348.230	US 54 Bus. south – Mexico	Access to the Missouri Military Academy
Audrain	Vandiver	216.992	349.215	Route JJ	
Audrain	Linn Township	220.6299	355.0694	Route A – Benton City	
Audrain	Linn Township	222.683	358.374	Route B – Rush Hill	
Audrain	Linn Township	226.672– 226.756	364.793– 364.928	Route 19 / Route BB – Martinsburg, Wellsville, Montgomery City	Western end of Route 19 concurrency; roundabout
Audrain	Laddonia	231.805	373.054	Route K / Route KK	
Audrain	Prairie Township	234.853	377.959	Route 19 / Route J – Perry, New London	Eastern end of Route 19 concurrency; roundabout
Audrain	Farber	238.477	383.792	Route AA	
Audrain	Farber	238.648	384.067	Route PP	
Audrain	Vandalia	243.167	391.339	Route P – Center	
Audrain	Vandalia	243.805	392.366	Route F / Route W	
Ralls	No major junctions				
Pike	Spencer Township	248.664	400.186	Route 154 – Perry, Paris	
Pike	Curryville	252.279	406.004	Route E / Route M	
Pike		254.816	410.087	Route U	
Pike	Bowling Green	258.291	415.679	US 54 Bus. – Bowling Green	
Pike	Bowling Green	259.630	417.834	US 61 Bus.	
Pike	Bowling Green	260.144– 260.161	418.661– 418.689	US 61 (Avenue of the Saints) – Hannibal, St. Louis	
Pike	Tarrants	261,171	420,314	US 54 Bus. – Bowling Green	
Pike	Buffalo Township	267.574	430.619	Route UU – Bowling Green	
Pike	Buffalo Township	268.122	431.501	Route NN	
Pike	Louisiana	271.194	436.444	Route 79 / Great River Road north – Hannibal	Western end of Route 79/Great River Road concurrency
Pike	Louisiana	271.444	436.847	Route 79 / Great River Road south – Clarksville	Eastern end of Route 79/Great River Road concurrency
Mississippi River		271.508	436.950	Champ Clark Bridge; Missouri–Illinois line	
Mississippi River		271.508	436.950	US 54 east – Pittsfield	Continuation into Illinois
1.000 mi = 1.609 km; 1.000 km = 0.621 mi: Concurrency terminus; Incomplete access

U.S. Route 54
Previous state: Kansas	Missouri	Next state: Illinois
