= McCarty Creek =

Stream in the American state of Missouri

McCarty Creek is a stream in Vernon and Barton counties, in the U.S. state of Missouri. It is a tributary to Clear Creek.

The stream headwaters arise in northern Vernon County about two miles northwest of Milford The stream flows north-northeast to enter southeastern Vernon County about four miles from the source. It continues passing east of Bellamy and west of Montevallo to its confluence with Clear Creek about eight miles southwest of El Dorado Springs.

The source area for the stream is at 37°36′35″N 94°10′39″W and the confluence is at 37°46′45″N 94°08′36″W at an elevation of 778 feet (237 m).

McCarty Creek was named for a pioneer who settled there in the 1830s.

== See also ==
- List of rivers of Missouri
