= Henry Township, Vernon County, Missouri =

Township in Vernon County, Missouri, U.S.

Coordinates: 38.0072°N 94.5544°W

Henry Township is a township in Vernon County, in the U.S. state of Missouri.

Henry Township was originally called "Summers Township", and under the latter was established in 1855. The present name, adopted in 1856, honors John McHenry, a pioneer citizen.

Little Osage River as well as Bitterroot Creek, Duncan Creek, Pecan Creek, Pryor Creek and Tolley Creek flow through the township.
