= Kitten Creek =

Stream in Missouri

Kitten Creek is a stream in St. Clair and Vernon counties in the U.S. state of Missouri. It is a tributary of Clear Creek.

The stream headwaters arise in eastern Vernon County south of Harwood at 37°55′39″N 94°09′04″W at an elevation of 860 feet (260 m). It flows generally to the east for approximately 5.5 miles (8.9 km) to its confluence with Clear Creek in southwest St. Clair County at 37°55′53″N 94°03′14″W at an elevation of 728 feet (222 m). The confluence is about 3 miles (5 km) north of El Dorado Springs in northwest Cedar County.

Kitten Creek was so named because a local woman owned many pet cats.

== See also ==
- List of rivers of Missouri
