= Champ Clark Bridge =

Champ Clark Bridge may refer to:

- Champ Clark Bridge (1928), a bridge opened in 1928 and closed in 2019
- Champ Clark Bridge (2019), a bridge opened in 2019
