= Pleasant Run Creek =

Pleasant Run Creek can refer to two waterways in the United States:

- Pleasant Run Creek (Indiana), a stream that flows through the city of Indianapolis, Indiana
- Pleasant Run Creek (Missouri), a stream in northern Barton and southern Vernon counties in Missouri
