= Drywood Township, Vernon County, Missouri =

Township in Vernon County, Missouri, U.S.

Coordinates: 37.7003°N 94.3244°W

Drywood Township is a township in Vernon County, in the U.S. state of Missouri.

Drywood Township was erected in 1855, taking its name from Dry Wood Creek.

Landon Branch, Little Clear Creek and Pleasant Run Creek flow through the township.
