= Montevallo (disambiguation) =

Montevallo is a city in Alabama.

Montevallo may also refer to:

- Montevallo, Missouri, an unincorporated community
- Montevallo Township, Vernon County, Missouri
- Montevallo (album), 2014 album by Sam Hunt
- Montevallo (crater), a crater on Mars
