= Tolley =

Tolley may refer to:

== People ==
- Bridget Tolley (born 1960), Canadian Algonquin community worker and activist
- Anne Tolley (born 1953), New Zealand politician
- Chris Tolley (born 1967), English cricketer
- Cyril Tolley (1895–1978), British golfer and politician
- Dave Tolley (born 1978), Canadian percussionist
- George S. Tolley (1925–2021), American agricultural economist
- Glenn Tolley (born 1983), British footballer
- Harold S. Tolley (1894–1956), American politician
- Jamie Tolley (born 1983), Welsh soccer player
- Jerry Tolley (born 1942), American football coach, educator and politician
- Kemp Tolley (1908–2000), U.S. Navy admiral
- Lee Tolley (1892–1972), American college football player and official
- Louis Tolley (1889–1959), British politician
- Rick Tolley (1940–1970), American football coach
- Robert Tolley (1849–1901), English cricketer
- William P. Tolley (1900–1996), American academic

== Other uses ==
- Mount Tolley, Antarctica
- Tolley, North Dakota, US
- Tolley & Company Warehouse, a heritage building in Fremantle, West Australia
- Tolley Creek, Vernon County, Missouri, UL
- Tolley family, South Australia winemakers
- Tolley (company), a publishing company in the UK

== See also ==
- Tolleys, West Virginia
