= Amos, Missouri =

Unincorporated community in Missouri, U.S.

Coordinates: 38°00′57″N 94°34′49″W

Amos is an unincorporated community in northwest Vernon County, in the U.S. state of Missouri.

The community is approximately 1.5 miles east of the Missouri-Kansas border, approximately three miles north-northwest of Stotesbury, and about 16 miles northwest of Nevada. It is on the banks of Duncan Creek, one mile north of that stream's confluence with the Little Osage River.

== History ==
Amos was platted in 1894 when the railroad was extended to that point. The community is named after Amos Nickerson, a local merchant. Amos's post office was established in 1893 and remained operational until 1931.

In 1925, Amos had 31 inhabitants.
