= Ketterman =

Ketterman may refer to:

- Ketterman, Missouri, an unincorporated community
- Ketterman, West Virginia, a ghost town
- Ketterman, the german term for the profession of creating chains
