= Wilson Branch =

Stream in the American state of Missouri

Coordinates: 37.845871°N 94.180778°W

Wilson Branch is a stream in Vernon County in the U.S. state of Missouri. It is a tributary of West Fork Clear Creek.

Wilson Branch has the name of Colonel Wilson, a pioneer citizen.

== See also ==
- List of rivers of Missouri
