= Metz Township =

Metz Township may refer to:

- Metz Township, Michigan
- Metz Township, Vernon County, Missouri
