= Moundville Township, Vernon County, Missouri =

Township in the US state of Missouri

Coordinates: 37.7097°N 94.4433°W

Moundville Township is a township in Vernon County, in the U.S. state of Missouri.

Moundville Township was erected in 1867, taking its name from the community of Moundville, Missouri.
