= Clear Creek (Osage River tributary) =

Stream in the U.S. state of Missouri

Coordinates: 37°59′44″N 93°56′12″W

Clear Creek is a stream in Cedar, Barton, Vernon, and St. Clair counties of southwest Missouri. It is a tributary of the Osage River.

The stream source area is in northeastern Barton County about 1.5 miles northeast of Irwin and the stream flows northeast then north passing through the Clear Creek Conservation Area into Vernon County and east of the community of Rousertown. The stream turns northeast and crosses Missouri Route E and U.S. Route 54 near the community of Dederick. The stream passes through the northwest corner of Cedar County northwest of El Dorado Springs and enters St. Clair County one mile east of Portia. The stream then flows northeast and enters the Osage River north of the community of Tiffin.

The stream headwaters are at and the confluence with the Osage is at .

== See also ==
- McCarty Creek
