= Blaine, Missouri =

Unincorporated community in Missouri, U.S.

Blaine
- Unincorporated community
- Location in Missouri Blaine (the United States)
- Coordinates: 37.9494801°N 94.3849506°W
- Country: United States
- State: Missouri
- County: Vernon
- Township: Osage
- Elevation: 764 ft (233 m)
- Time zone: UTC−6 (CST)
  - Summer (DST): UTC−5 (CDT)
- Area code: 417

Blaine is an unincorporated community in Osage Township, Vernon County, in the U.S. state of Missouri.

== History ==
Blaine was platted in 1884 and named after James G. Blaine, an American statesman and Republican politician who was the Republican Party's presidential nominee that year. Blaine had previously served as Speaker of the House, U.S. Senator from Maine, and Secretary of State; he lost the 1884 election to Grover Cleveland by a narrow margin.

A post office called Blaine was established in 1884 and remained in operation until 1888.

== Geography ==
Blaine is located in Osage Township in the northern part of Vernon County, approximately 8 miles (13 km) north of Nevada, the county seat. The community sits at an elevation of 764 feet (233 m) above sea level on the gently rolling prairies characteristic of the Osage Plains.

Osage Township was established in 1855 when Vernon County was organized and takes its name from the Osage people, who historically controlled a vast territory in the region. The Osage Village State Historic Site, preserving an archaeological site of a major Osage village occupied from approximately 1700 to 1775, is located elsewhere in Vernon County.
