= Virgil Township, Vernon County, Missouri =

Township in the U.S. state of Missouri

Coordinates: 37.7911°N 94.1200°W

Virgil Township is a township in Vernon County, in the U.S. state of Missouri.

Virgil Township takes its name from the community of Virgil City, Missouri.
