= Pleasant Run Creek (Missouri) =

Stream in the American state of Missouri

Pleasant Run Creek is a stream in northern Barton and southern Vernon counties in the U.S. state of Missouri. It is a tributary of the Little Dry Wood Creek.

The stream headwaters arise along the west side of US Route 71 between Irwin and Sheldon. It flows generally northwest to its confluence with the Little Dry Wood Creek about three miles northeast of Bronaugh.

The stream source area is at 37°37′18″N 94°18′27″W and the confluence is at 37°42′40″N 94°23′47″W.

Pleasant Run Creek was so named due to the "pleasant" setting of its watercourse.

== See also ==
- List of rivers of Missouri
