= Senator Cochran (disambiguation) =

Thad Cochran (1937–2019) was a U.S. Senator for Mississippi from 1978 to 2018. Senator Cochran may also refer to:

- Charles F. Cochran (1846–1906), Missouri State Senate
- James Cochran (New York politician) (1769–1848), New York State Senate
- James Cochran (North Carolina politician) (1760s–1813), North Carolina State Senate
- Orville Cochran (1871–1948), Alaska Territorial Senate
