= Pashaw, Missouri =

Extinct town in the U.S. state of Missouri

Coordinates: 37.839759°N 94.092721°W

Pashaw is an extinct town in Vernon County, in the U.S. state of Missouri.

A post office called Pashaw was established in 1888, and remained in operation until 1905. The community took its name from a local nearby creek.
