= Duncan Creek (Little Osage River tributary) =

Stream in the U.S. state of Missouri

Duncan Creek is a stream in Bates and Vernon counties in the U.S. state of Missouri. It is a tributary of the Little Osage River. The stream headwaters arise at 38°4′55″N 94°34′58″W south of the community of Hume in Bates County and one mile from the Missouri-Kansas border. It flows to the south into Vernon County and passes just west of the community of Amos and on to its confluence with the Little Osage two miles northwest of Stotesbury at 37°59′48″N 94°35′3″W.

Duncan Creek has the name of Peter Duncan, a pioneer citizen.

== See also ==
- List of rivers of Missouri
