= Harrison Township, Vernon County, Missouri =

Township in Vernon County, Missouri, U.S.

Coordinates: 37.7011°N 94.5519°W

Harrison Township is a township in Vernon County, in the U.S. state of Missouri.

Harrison Township was erected in 1842, taking its name from President William Henry Harrison.
