= Ellis, Missouri =

Unincorporated community in Missouri, U.S.

Coordinates: 37°49′29″N 94°26′55″W

Ellis is an unincorporated community in Vernon County, in the U.S. state of Missouri.

== History ==
Ellis was originally called "Prewitt", and under the latter name was platted in 1876. A post office called Ellis was established in 1877, and remained in operation until 1903. The present name most likely is after a railroad man, according to local history.
