= Stark Township, Hickory County, Missouri =

Township in Missouri

Coordinates: 37.9417°N 93.1617°W

Stark Township is an inactive township in Hickory County, in the U.S. state of Missouri.

Stark Township was established in 1845, taking its name from Starks Creek.
