= Walker Township, Vernon County, Missouri =

Township in the US state of Missouri

Coordinates: 37.8839°N 94.2375°W

Walker Township is a township in Vernon County, in the U.S. state of Missouri.

Walker Township takes its name from the community of Walker, Missouri.
