= Washington Township, Vernon County, Missouri =

Township in Vernon County, Missouri, U.S.

Coordinates: 37.8983°N 94.3431°W

Washington Township is a township in Vernon County, in the U.S. state of Missouri.

Washington Township most likely was named in honor of President George Washington.
