= Richland Township, Vernon County, Missouri =

Township in the American state of Missouri

Coordinates: 37.8933°N 94.5608°W

Richland Township is a township in Vernon County, in the U.S. state of Missouri.

Richland Township was erected in 1855. Some say the township was so named on account of their fertile soil, while others believe the name is a transfer from Richland County, Ohio.
