= Dederick, Missouri =

Unincorporated community in Missouri, US

Coordinates: 37°51′26″N 94°07′40″W

Dederick is an unincorporated community in eastern Vernon County, in the U.S. state of Missouri. The community is located along US Route 54 approximately 11.5 miles east of Nevada and three miles west of the Vernon-Cedar county line. Clear Creek flows past the east side of the community.

== History ==
Variant names were "Dedrick" and "Goodrick". A post office called Goodrick was established in 1883, and closed in 1890; the post office reopened in 1909 as Dederick, and was discontinued in 1957. The present name is after P. K. Dedrick, who donated land to the railroad in exchange for the naming rights.
