= Katy, Missouri =

Unincorporated community in Missouri, U.S.

Coordinates: 37°49′42″N 94°34′18″W

Katy is an unincorporated community in Vernon County, in the U.S. state of Missouri.

== History ==
A post office called Katy was established in 1894, and remained in operation until 1908. The community took its name from the Katy Railroad.
