= Montevallo Township, Vernon County, Missouri =

Township in the U.S. state of Missouri

Coordinates: 37.7019°N 94.1150°W

Montevallo Township is a township in Vernon County, in the U.S. state of Missouri.

Montevallo Township was erected in 1855, taking its name from the community of Montevallo, Missouri.
