= Dover Township, Vernon County, Missouri =

Township in Vernon County, Missouri, U.S.

Coordinates: 37.7017°N 94.2208°W

Dover Township is a township in Vernon County, in the U.S. state of Missouri. Dover Township was erected in 1872. Dover Township is located in southwestern Vernon County. The origin of its name is unknown, although a 1933 study of Missouri place names suggested that it may ultimately derive from Dover, England, either through another American place of that name or from the surname Dover.
