= Metz Township, Vernon County, Missouri =

Township in the US state of Missouri

Coordinates: 37.9981°N 94.4458°W

Metz Township is a township in Vernon County, in the U.S. state of Missouri.

== History ==
The first permanent settlement at Metz Township was made in 1829. Metz Township was erected in 1873, taking its name from the community of Metz, Missouri.
