= Lake Township, Vernon County, Missouri =

Township in Vernon County, Missouri, U.S.

Coordinates: 37.8968964°N 94.4524154°W

Lake Township is a township in Vernon County, in the U.S. state of Missouri.

Lake Township most likely took its name from a small lake within its borders.
