= Senator Roy Blunt Bridge =

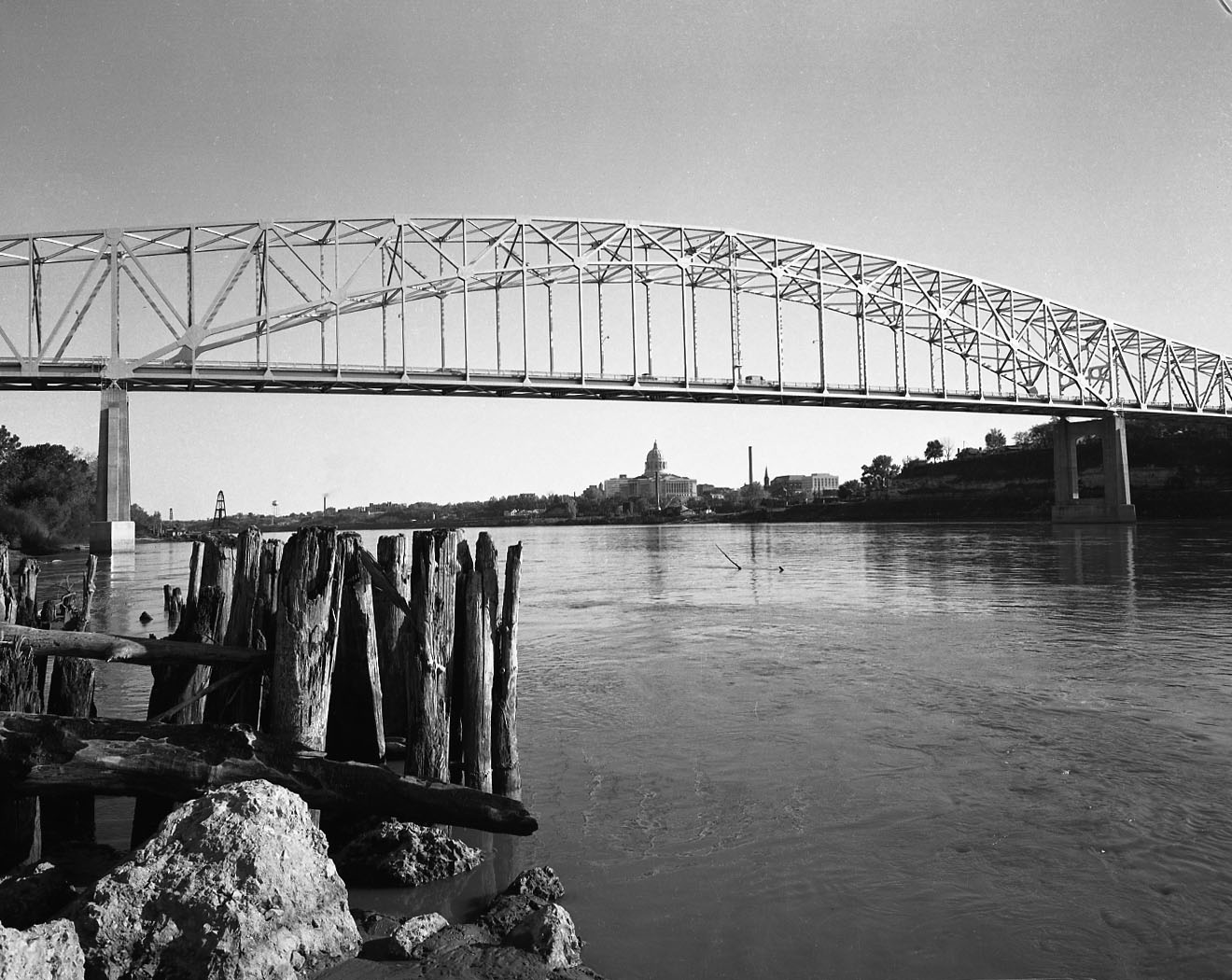
- The bridge in 1956. A second span was added in 1991
- Coordinates: 38°35′15″N 92°10′44″W
- Carries: US 54 / US 63
- Crosses: Missouri River
- Locale: Jefferson City, Missouri

Characteristics
- Design: Twin Trussed Arch Spans
- Total length: 942.7m
- Width: 11.5m
- Height: 11.5m
- Longest span: 195m

History
- Opened: 1896 (original bridge); August 1955 (westbound bridge); 1991 (eastbound bridge)

Location
- Interactive map of Senator Roy Blunt Bridge

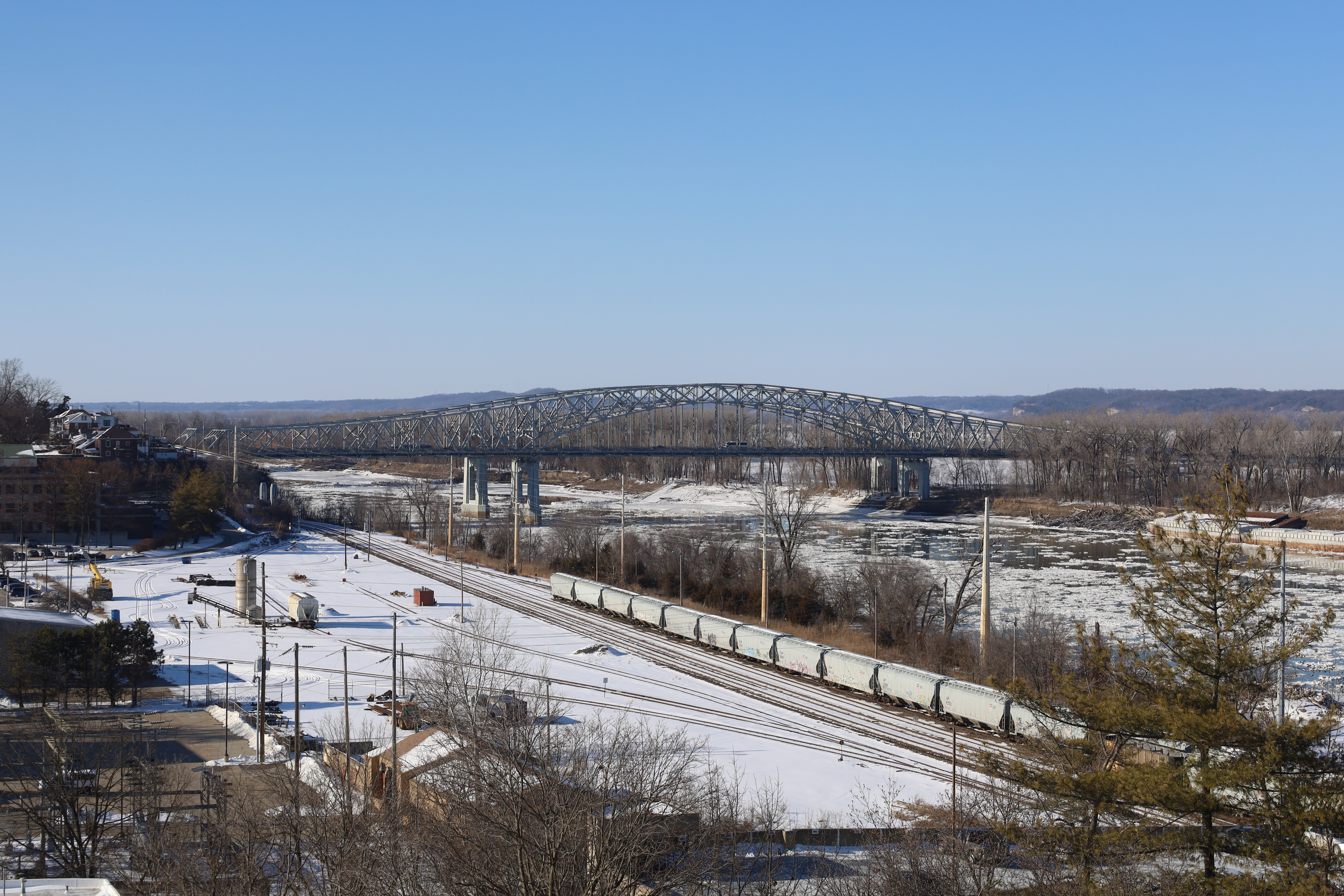
The bridge in 2025, viewed from the Missouri State Capitol

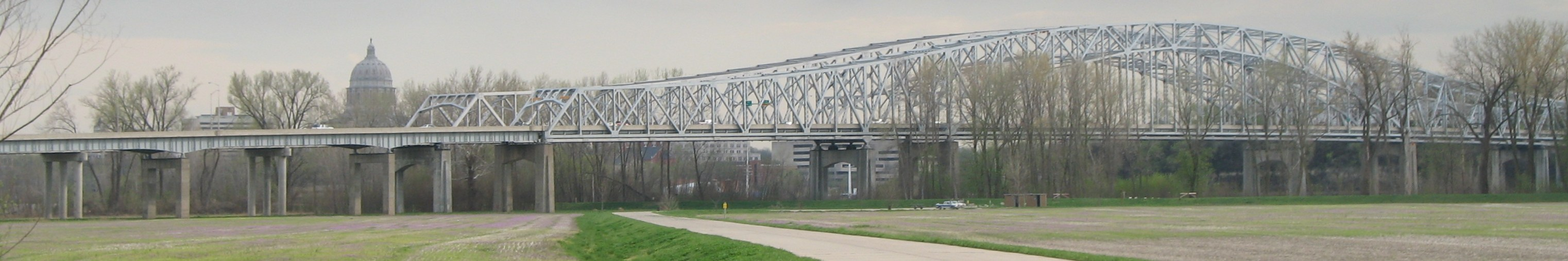
The bridge in 2007 from the northwest bank, with the Missouri State Capitol in background

The Senator Roy Blunt Bridge are twin continuous through arch truss bridges over the Missouri River at Jefferson City, Missouri, which carry U.S. Routes 54 (US 54) and 63 between Cole County and Callaway County. Before being officially named for former Missouri Senator Roy Blunt in 2022, the bridge was known as the Jefferson City Bridge.

Opened in 1991, the bridges provide access to Jefferson city from the north and access to the Lake of the Ozarks and Rolla.

As of 2018, the combined bridges see approximately 29,000 vehicle traversals per day.

== History ==
The original bridge was built in 1896 and had three spans and was downstream of the current bridges. It was a swing bridge, and its column in the middle of the river rotated 90° to allow boat traffic to pass (the rotation could disrupt traffic for 45 minutes). The main span was 134.1 metres (440 ft). The diameter of the pivot pier was 6.7 metres (22 ft). The pillars at the south entrance to the bridge are still in place, now a part of Rotary Park, overlooking the river at the end of Bolivar Street.

The present-day westbound bridge was designed by Sverdrup & Parcel of St. Louis in 1953 and fabricated by Stupp Brokers Bridge & Iron Company. It opened in 1955 and carried both directions of travel, with a reversible center lane which alternated direction based on commuter traffic volumes. The original bridge was then closed to traffic, and was finally demolished in 1958.

Due to increasing traffic in the area a second twin structure was opened in 1991 and carries four lanes of eastbound traffic. The 1955 bridge was then extensively rehabilitated and restriped to carry three lanes of westbound traffic. The 1991 bridge retained the same basic design of the 1955 structure. In 2001, an expanded shoulder was introduced on the eastbound span.

The eastbound bridges cantilevered bicycle and pedestrian walkway opened in April 2011. It is used in both directions for river viewing and access to the Katy Trail State Park. A city-maintained extension of the Katy (following a former KATY railroad spur) connects to the North Jefferson trailhead.

The westbound bridge was repainted, repaved, and rehabilitated in 2015.

The eastbound bridge was repaved rehabilitated in 2021.

The bridge were designated after former Missouri Senator Roy Blunt in 2022.

== See also ==
- List of crossings of the Missouri River
