= Carbon Center, Missouri =

Unincorporated community in Missouri, U.S.

Coordinates: 38°02′46″N 94°19′19″W

Carbon Center is an unincorporated community in Vernon County, in the U.S. state of Missouri.

== History ==
A post office called "Carbon Centre" was established in 1874, and remained in operation until 1904. The community was so named on account of local deposits of coal, a carbon-based fuel.
