= Landon Branch =

Stream in Vernon County in the U.S

Coordinates: 37.7814291°N 94.3643944°W

Landon Branch is a stream in Vernon County in the U.S. state of Missouri.

Landon Branch has the name of the local Landon family.

== See also ==
- List of rivers of Missouri
