= Panama, Missouri =

Unincorporated community in Missouri, U.S.

Coordinates: 38°02′49″N 94°21′18″W

Panama is an unincorporated community in northern Vernon County, in the U.S. state of Missouri. The community is on Missouri Route TT adjacent to the east side of US Route 71. The Vernon-Bates county line is one half mile north. Rich Hill is 3.5 miles north and Nevada is 13 miles south. The Four Rivers Conservation Area on the Little Osage River is two miles south.

== History ==
A post office called Panama was established in 1893, and remained in operation until 1909. The community was named after the Panama Canal project.
