= Rinehart, Missouri =

Unincorporated community in Missouri, U.S.

Coordinates: 37°57′22″N 94°29′55″W

Rinehart is an unincorporated community in Vernon County, in the U.S. state of Missouri.

== History ==
A post office called Rinehart was established in 1882, and remained in operation until 1936. The community has the name of Johiel H. Rinehart, a pioneer citizen.
