= Badger Township, Vernon County, Missouri =

Township in the US state of Missouri

Coordinates: 37.7969°N 94.2464°W

Badger Township is a township in Vernon County, in the U.S. state of Missouri.

Badger Township was erected in 1873, taking its name from Albert Badger, a country doctor.
