= Fair Haven, Missouri =

Unincorporated community in Missouri, U.S.

Coordinates: 37°58′35″N 94°10′24″W

Fair Haven is an unincorporated community in Vernon County, in the U.S. state of Missouri.

== History ==
Fair Haven was originally called "Connely's Springs", and under the latter name was platted in 1881 by J. W. Connely, and named for him. A post office called Connely was established in 1886, the name was changed to Fairhaven in 1890, and the post office closed in 1908. The present name is after the Fair Haven mineral spa near the original town site. A variant name was "Fair Haven Springs".

== Demographics ==
Historical population
Census	Pop.	Note	%±
1900	88		—
1910	62		−29.5%
1920	82		32.3%
1930	46		−43.9%
Missouri Census Data Center
