= Pryor Creek (Missouri) =

Stream in Missouri, US

Coordinates: 37.981424°N 94.466341°W

Pryor Creek is a stream in Bates and Vernon Counties in the U.S. state of Missouri. It is a tributary of the Little Osage River.

Pryor Creek has the name of William Pryor, a pioneer citizen.

== See also ==
- List of rivers of Missouri
