= Milo, Missouri =

- Village
- Location of Milo, Missouri
- Coordinates: 37°45′19″N 94°18′19″W
- Country: United States
- State: Missouri
- County: Vernon
- Incorporated: 1884

Area
  - Total: 0.077 sq mi (0.20 km^{2})
  - Land: 0.077 sq mi (0.20 km^{2})
  - Water: 0 sq mi (0.00 km^{2})
- Elevation: 876 ft (267 m)

Population (2020)
  - Total: 57
  - Density: 747/sq mi (288.4/km^{2})
- Time zone: UTC-6 (Central (CST))
  - Summer (DST): UTC-5 (CDT)
- ZIP code: 64767
- Area code: 417
- FIPS code: 29-48476
- GNIS feature ID: 2399365
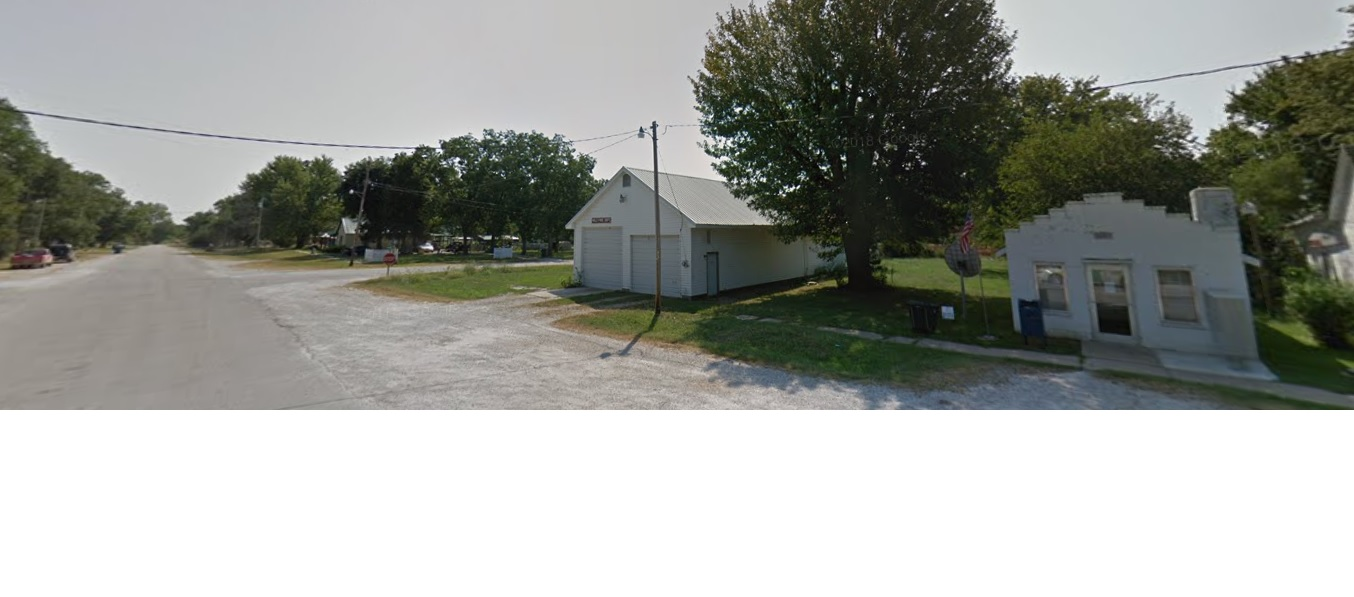
- Downtown Milo, MO with Fire Department and Post Office

Milo (/ˈmaɪloʊ/ MY-loh) is a village in Vernon County, Missouri, United States. As of the 2020 census, Milo had a population of 57.

== History ==
Milo was laid out by J.L. Samples on October 4, 1881 when the Lexington and Southern Railroad division of the Missouri Pacific Railroad, located in the northwest part of Drywood Township; created a station nearby. The community name has been tied to an early settler named Milo Main. A post office has been in operation at Milo since 1883.

Milo was a minor cattle town by which cattlemen took Texas Longhorn cattle afoot to railheads or depots to the north. The town housed the Dale Wholesale Saddlery Company and the J.L. Truex general store which supplied cattlemen, farmers, and nearby Camp Clark in Nevada, Missouri.

== Geography ==
Milo is located just east of US Route 71 approximately six miles south of Nevada and 6.5 miles north of the community of Sheldon.

According to the United States Census Bureau, the village has a total area of 0.08 square miles (0.21 km^{2}), all land.

== Demographics ==
Historical population
Census	Pop.	Note	%±
1910	128		—
1920	134		4.7%
1930	111		−17.2%
1940	129		16.2%
1950	124		−3.9%
1960	108		−12.9%
1970	80		−25.9%
1980	78		−2.5%
1990	76		−2.6%
2000	84		10.5%
2010	90		7.1%
2020	57		−36.7%
U.S. Decennial Census

=== 2010 census ===
As of the census of 2010, there were 90 people, 32 households, and 22 families living in the village. The population density was 1,125.0 inhabitants per square mile (434.4/km^{2}). There were 36 housing units at an average density of 450.0 per square mile (173.7/km^{2}). The racial makeup of the village was 96.7% White and 3.3% Native American. Hispanic or Latino of any race were 1.1% of the population.

There were 32 households, of which 43.8% had children under the age of 18 living with them, 59.4% were married couples living together, 6.3% had a female householder with no husband present, 3.1% had a male householder with no wife present, and 31.3% were non-families. 21.9% of all households were made up of individuals, and 6.3% had someone living alone who was 65 years of age or older. The average household size was 2.81 and the average family size was 3.50.

The median age in the village was 37 years. 28.9% of residents were under the age of 18; 8.9% were between the ages of 18 and 24; 23.4% were from 25 to 44; 25.6% were from 45 to 64; and 13.3% were 65 years of age or older. The gender makeup of the village was 45.6% male and 54.4% female.

=== 2000 census ===
As of the census of 2000, there were 84 people, 32 households, and 23 families living in the village. The population density was 1,094.3 inhabitants per square mile (422.5/km^{2}). There were 35 housing units at an average density of 456.0 per square mile (176.1/km^{2}). The racial makeup of the village was 98.81% White and 1.19% Native American. Hispanic or Latino of any race were 1.19% of the population.

There were 32 households, out of which 37.5% had children under the age of 18 living with them, 56.3% were married couples living together, 9.4% had a female householder with no husband present, and 28.1% were non-families. 21.9% of all households were made up of individuals, and 15.6% had someone living alone who was 65 years of age or older. The average household size was 2.63 and the average family size was 3.09.

In the village, the population was spread out, with 33.3% under the age of 18, 7.1% from 18 to 24, 23.8% from 25 to 44, 26.2% from 45 to 64, and 9.5% who were 65 years of age or older. The median age was 34 years. For every 100 females, there were 95.3 males. For every 100 females age 18 and over, there were 93.1 males.

The median income for a household in the village was $23,125, and the median income for a family was $28,333. Males had a median income of $20,750 versus $23,125 for females. The per capita income for the village was $11,887. There were 13.6% of families and 15.4% of the population living below the poverty line, including 19.0% of under eighteens and none of those over 64.
