= Swart, Missouri =

Unincorporated community in Missouri, U.S.

Coordinates: 37°45′04″N 94°35′01″W

Swart is an unincorporated community in Vernon County, in the U.S. state of Missouri.

== History ==
Swart was platted in 1893, and named after D. S. Swart, the original owner of the town site. A post office called Swart was established in 1893, and remained in operation until 1919. Variant names were "Swarts" and "Swartz".
