= Coal Township, Vernon County, Missouri =

Township in the US state of Missouri

Coordinates: 37.8131°N 94.5633°W

Coal Township is a township in Vernon County, in the U.S. state of Missouri.

Coal Township was erected in 1856, and named for local deposits of coal.
