= Walker, Missouri =

- City
- Location of Walker, Missouri
- Coordinates: 37°53′56″N 94°13′50″W
- Country: United States
- State: Missouri
- County: Vernon

Area
  - Total: 0.31 sq mi (0.81 km^{2})
  - Land: 0.31 sq mi (0.81 km^{2})
  - Water: 0 sq mi (0.00 km^{2})
- Elevation: 853 ft (260 m)

Population (2020)
  - Total: 199
  - Density: 640.2/sq mi (247.17/km^{2})
- Time zone: UTC-6 (Central (CST))
  - Summer (DST): UTC-5 (CDT)
- ZIP code: 64790
- Area code: 417
- FIPS code: 29-76660
- GNIS feature ID: 2397176

Walker is a city in Vernon County, Missouri, United States. The population was 199 at the 2020 census.

== History ==
Walker had its start when the railroad was extended to that point. The town site was platted in 1870. The city was named for Hiram F. Walker, an early resident. A post office has been in operation at Walker since 1871. The city was incorporated in 1886.

== Geography ==
Walker is located at the intersection of Missouri routes C and AA approximately seven miles northeast of Nevada and the community of Harwood lies 5.5 miles to the northeast.

According to the United States Census Bureau, the city has a total area of 0.31 square miles (0.80 km^{2}), all land.

== Demographics ==
Historical population
Census	Pop.	Note	%±
1880	200		—
1890	594		197.0%
1900	479		−19.4%
1910	354		−26.1%
1920	309		−12.7%
1930	258		−16.5%
1940	265		2.7%
1950	204		−23.0%
1960	235		15.2%
1970	227		−3.4%
1980	325		43.2%
1990	283		−12.9%
2000	275		−2.8%
2010	270		−1.8%
2020	199		−26.3%
U.S. Decennial Census

=== 2010 census ===
As of the census of 2010, there were 270 people, 113 households, and 73 families living in the city. The population density was 871.0 inhabitants per square mile (336.3/km^{2}). There were 122 housing units at an average density of 393.5 per square mile (151.9/km^{2}). The racial makeup of the city was 96.7% White, 1.1% Native American, 0.7% from other races, and 1.5% from two or more races. Hispanic or Latino of any race were 2.6% of the population.

There were 113 households, of which 32.7% had children under the age of 18 living with them, 51.3% were married couples living together, 8.0% had a female householder with no husband present, 5.3% had a male householder with no wife present, and 35.4% were non-families. 28.3% of all households were made up of individuals, and 12.4% had someone living alone who was 65 years of age or older. The average household size was 2.39 and the average family size was 2.93.

The median age in the city was 41 years. 26.3% of residents were under the age of 18; 7% were between the ages of 18 and 24; 22.2% were from 25 to 44; 27.8% were from 45 to 64; and 16.7% were 65 years of age or older. The gender makeup of the city was 51.1% male and 48.9% female.

=== 2000 census ===
As of the census of 2000, there were 275 people, 110 households, and 85 families living in the city. The population density was 883.7 inhabitants per square mile (341.2/km^{2}). There were 125 housing units at an average density of 401.7 per square mile (155.1/km^{2}). The racial makeup of the city was 96.73% White, 0.36% African American, 0.73% Native American, 0.36% from other races, and 1.82% from two or more races. Hispanic or Latino of any race were 1.82% of the population.

There were 110 households, out of which 36.4% had children under the age of 18 living with them, 60.0% were married couples living together, 11.8% had a female householder with no husband present, and 22.7% were non-families. 20.0% of all households were made up of individuals, and 9.1% had someone living alone who was 65 years of age or older. The average household size was 2.50 and the average family size was 2.82.

In the city the population was spread out, with 25.1% under the age of 18, 10.2% from 18 to 24, 28.7% from 25 to 44, 23.6% from 45 to 64, and 12.4% who were 65 years of age or older. The median age was 36 years. For every 100 females there were 102.2 males. For every 100 females age 18 and over, there were 94.3 males.

The median income for a household in the city was $28,542, and the median income for a family was $31,250. Males had a median income of $22,083 versus $17,500 for females. The per capita income for the city was $16,949. About 13.8% of families and 12.9% of the population were below the poverty line, including 20.6% of those under the age of eighteen and 20.7% of those 65 or over.
