= Bellamy, Missouri =

Unincorporated community in Missouri, U.S.

Coordinates: 37°41′06″N 94°10′50″W

Bellamy is an unincorporated community in Vernon County, in the U.S. state of Missouri.

== History ==
Bellamy was platted in 1882 by Thomas Bellamy, who gave the community his family name. A post office called Bellamy was established in 1883, and remained in operation until 1907. A variant name was "Bellamy City".
