= Richards, Missouri =

- Village
- Location of Richards, Missouri
- Coordinates: 37°54′38″N 94°33′26″W
- Country: United States
- State: Missouri
- County: Vernon
- Incorporated: 1894

Area
  - Total: 0.27 sq mi (0.70 km^{2})
  - Land: 0.27 sq mi (0.69 km^{2})
  - Water: 0 sq mi (0.00 km^{2})
- Elevation: 843 ft (257 m)

Population (2020)
  - Total: 43
  - Density: 160/sq mi (62/km^{2})
- Time zone: UTC-6 (Central (CST))
  - Summer (DST): UTC-5 (CDT)
- ZIP code: 64778
- Area code: 417
- FIPS code: 29-61364
- GNIS feature ID: 2396877

Richards is a village in northwest Vernon County, Missouri, United States. The population was 96 at the 2010 census.

== History ==
Richards was laid out and platted in 1891 when the railroad was extended to that point. The village's name honors Joseph Harvey Richards, a railroad official. A post office has been in operation at Richards since 1890.

== Geography ==
Richards is located on Missouri Route H. Stotesbury is approximately four miles to the north via Missouri Route Z and Nevada is eleven miles to the southeast. The Missouri-Kansas border is three miles to the west.

According to the United States Census Bureau, the village has a total area of 0.27 square miles (0.70 km^{2}), all land.

== Demographics ==
Historical population
Census	Pop.	Note	%±
1900	198		—
1910	303		53.0%
1920	359		18.5%
1930	255		−29.0%
1940	246		−3.5%
1950	190		−22.8%
1960	133		−30.0%
1970	105		−21.1%
1980	117		11.4%
1990	106		−9.4%
2000	95		−10.4%
2010	96		1.1%
2020	43		−55.2%
U.S. Decennial Census

=== 2010 census ===
As of the census of 2010, there were 96 people, 36 households, and 27 families living in the village. The population density was 355.6 inhabitants per square mile (137.3/km^{2}). There were 44 housing units at an average density of 163.0 per square mile (62.9/km^{2}). The racial makeup of the village was 95.8% White and 4.2% from two or more races. Hispanic or Latino of any race were 1.0% of the population.

There were 36 households, of which 38.9% had children under the age of 18 living with them, 52.8% were married couples living together, 19.4% had a female householder with no husband present, 2.8% had a male householder with no wife present, and 25.0% were non-families. 22.2% of all households were made up of individuals, and 8.4% had someone living alone who was 65 years of age or older. The average household size was 2.67 and the average family size was 3.11.

The median age in the village was 32 years. 29.2% of residents were under the age of 18; 8.5% were between the ages of 18 and 24; 22.9% were from 25 to 44; 22% were from 45 to 64; and 17.7% were 65 years of age or older. The gender makeup of the village was 52.1% male and 47.9% female.

=== 2000 census ===
As of the census of 2000, there were 95 people, 37 households, and 25 families living in the town. The population density was 347.1 inhabitants per square mile (134.0/km^{2}). There were 42 housing units at an average density of 153.5 per square mile (59.3/km^{2}). The racial makeup of the town was 96.84% White, and 3.16% from two or more races.

There were 37 households, out of which 37.8% had children under the age of 18 living with them, 54.1% were married couples living together, 2.7% had a female householder with no husband present, and 32.4% were non-families. 29.7% of all households were made up of individuals, and 18.9% had someone living alone who was 65 years of age or older. The average household size was 2.57 and the average family size was 3.16.

In the town the population was spread out, with 29.5% under the age of 18, 6.3% from 18 to 24, 24.2% from 25 to 44, 23.2% from 45 to 64, and 16.8% who were 65 years of age or older. The median age was 38 years. For every 100 females, there were 102.1 males. For every 100 females age 18 and over, there were 109.4 males.

The median income for a household in the town was $35,938, and the median income for a family was $44,583. Males had a median income of $26,875 versus $25,833 for females. The per capita income for the town was $16,489. There were 9.7% of families and 12.4% of the population living below the poverty line, including 5.9% of under eighteens and none of those over 64.
