= Tolley Creek =

Stream in Missouri, USA

Coordinates: 38.012535°N 94.557177°W

Tolley Creek is a stream in Vernon County in the U.S. state of Missouri.

Tolley Creek has the name of a pioneer citizen.

== See also ==
- List of rivers of Missouri
