= Ketterman, Missouri =

Unincorporated community in Missouri, U.S.

Coordinates: 37°57′30″N 94°17′07″W

Ketterman
- Location within Missouri
- Country: United States
- State: Missouri
- County: Vernon
- Established: 1885
- Time zone: UTC-6
  - Summer (DST): UTC-5

Ketterman was an unincorporated community in Vernon County, in the U.S. state of Missouri.

== History ==
A post office called Ketterman was established in 1885, and remained in operation until 1904. The community had the name of M. Ketterman, an early settler.
