= Cross Timbers, Missouri =

- City
- Location of Cross Timbers, Missouri
- Coordinates: 38°01′27″N 93°13′46″W
- Country: United States
- State: Missouri
- County: Hickory

Area
  - Total: 0.45 sq mi (1.16 km^{2})
  - Land: 0.45 sq mi (1.16 km^{2})
  - Water: 0 sq mi (0.00 km^{2})
- Elevation: 1,030 ft (310 m)

Population (2020)
  - Total: 119
  - Density: 266.4/sq mi (102.85/km^{2})
- Time zone: UTC-6 (Central (CST))
  - Summer (DST): UTC-5 (CDT)
- ZIP code: 65634
- Area code: 417
- FIPS code: 29-17524
- GNIS feature ID: 2393680

Cross Timbers is a city in Hickory County, Missouri, United States. The population was 119 at the 2020 census.

== History ==
A post office called Cross Timbers has been in operation since 1847. The community was named for a strip of trees (colloquially a "cross timber") near the original town site. The town was platted in 1871.

== Geography ==
Cross Timbers is located at 38°1′28″N 93°13′41″W (38.024401, -93.228072).

According to the United States Census Bureau, the city has a total area of 0.45 square miles (1.17 km^{2}), all land.

== Demographics ==
Historical population
Census	Pop.	Note	%±
1880	130		—
1950	179		—
1960	186		3.9%
1970	204		9.7%
1980	217		6.4%
1990	168		−22.6%
2000	185		10.1%
2010	216		16.8%
2020	119		−44.9%
U.S. Decennial Census

=== 2010 census ===
As of the census of 2010, there were 216 people, 93 households, and 50 families residing in the city. The population density was 480.0 inhabitants per square mile (185.3/km^{2}). There were 116 housing units at an average density of 257.8 per square mile (99.5/km^{2}). The racial makeup of the city was 99.5% White and 0.5% from two or more races.

There were 93 households, of which 25.8% had children under the age of 18 living with them, 36.6% were married couples living together, 8.6% had a female householder with no husband present, 8.6% had a male householder with no wife present, and 46.2% were non-families. 37.6% of all households were made up of individuals, and 18.3% had someone living alone who was 65 years of age or older. The average household size was 2.32 and the average family size was 3.24.

The median age in the city was 44.7 years. 25% of residents were under the age of 18; 6.5% were between the ages of 18 and 24; 19.5% were from 25 to 44; 31.9% were from 45 to 64; and 17.1% were 65 years of age or older. The gender makeup of the city was 48.1% male and 51.9% female.

=== 2000 census ===
As of the census of 2000, there were 185 people, 90 households, and 45 families residing in the city. The population density was 411.1 inhabitants per square mile (158.7/km^{2}). There were 114 housing units at an average density of 253.4 per square mile (97.8/km^{2}). The racial makeup of the city was 99.46% White, and 0.54% from two or more races.

There were 90 households, out of which 26.7% had children under the age of 18 living with them, 37.8% were married couples living together, 8.9% had a female householder with no husband present, and 50.0% were non-families. 48.9% of all households were made up of individuals, and 32.2% had someone living alone who was 65 years of age or older. The average household size was 2.06 and the average family size was 3.04.

In the city the population was spread out, with 26.5% under the age of 18, 7.6% from 18 to 24, 21.6% from 25 to 44, 18.9% from 45 to 64, and 25.4% who were 65 years of age or older. The median age was 41 years. For every 100 females, there were 98.9 males. For every 100 females age 18 and over, there were 83.8 males.

The median income for a household in the city was $12,917, and the median income for a family was $20,000. Males had a median income of $26,607 versus $21,250 for females. The per capita income for the city was $10,413. About 50.0% of families and 42.6% of the population were below the poverty line, including 60.0% of those under the age of eighteen and 15.9% of those 65 or over.
