= Virgil City, Missouri =

- Unincorporated community
- Location within Missouri Location within the United States
- Coordinates: 37°45′59″N 94°04′22″W
- Country: United States
- State: Missouri
- Counties: Cedar, Vernon
- Elevation: 968 ft (295 m)
- Time zone: UTC-6 (Central (CST))
  - Summer (DST): UTC-5 (CDT)
- Area code: 417
- GNIS feature ID: 748534

Virgil City is an unincorporated community in Cedar County, Missouri. The community extends across the border into Vernon County. The community is south-southwest of El Dorado Springs and northeast of Montevallo.

== History ==
Virgil City was platted in 1866, and named for Virgil W. Kimball, founder. A post office called Virgil City was established in 1868, and remained in operation until 1905.

== Notable people ==
Virgil City has been the home of two members of the United States House of Representatives: Charles Germman Burton (a Republican) and Frank H. Lee (a Democrat). Virgil City was also the home of Orville D. Cochran, lawyer and a Democratic member of the Alaska Territorial Legislature.
