= Tolleys, West Virginia =

Tolleys
- Unincorporated community
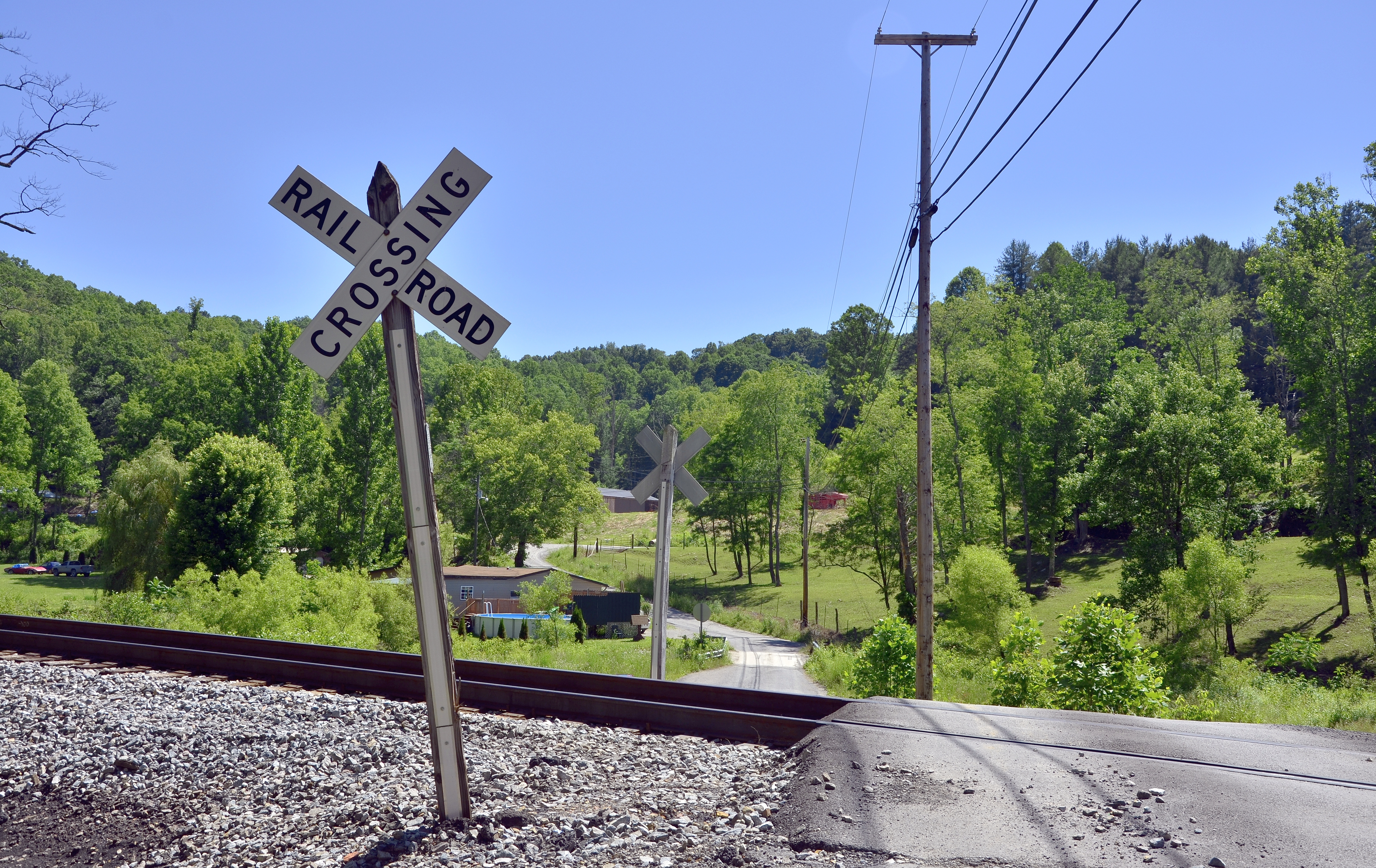
- Tolleys

- Location within the state of West Virginia Tolleys (the United States)
- Coordinates: 37°45′21″N 81°18′41″W
- Country: United States
- State: West Virginia
- County: Raleigh
- Elevation: 1,978 ft (603 m)
- Time zone: UTC-5 (Eastern (EST))
  - Summer (DST): UTC-4 (EDT)
- GNIS ID: 1548113

Tolleys is an unincorporated community in Raleigh County, West Virginia, United States.
