= Orville Cochran =

American politician

Orville Deville Cochran

President of the Alaska Territorial Senate
- In office 1943–1945
- Preceded by: Henry Roden
- Succeeded by: Ed Coffey

Member of the Alaska House of Representatives from the 2nd district
- In office March 7, 1921 – March 5, 1923 Serving with Charles W. Brown; Victor A. Julien; Edgar L. Holt

Member of the Alaska Senate from the 2nd district
- In office January 11, 1937 – January 24, 1949 Serving with John F. Devine (1937-1939); LeRoy M. Sullivan (1939-1943); Stuart L. Stangroom (1943-1945); Frank H. Whaley (1945-1947); Howard Lyng (1945-1947); Tolbert P. Scott (1945-1949); William Munz (1947-1949); Charles D. Jones (1947-1949)
- Preceded by: James Frawley
- Succeeded by: Howard Lyng

Personal details
- Born: March 10, 1871 Virgil City, Missouri, U.S.
- Died: January 30, 1948 (aged 76) Nome, Alaska
- Party: Independent (1921); Democrat

Orville Deville Cochran (March 10, 1871 – January 30, 1948) was born in Virgil City, Missouri, and went to school in Parsons, Kansas. Cochran lived in Portland, Oregon, and practiced law. In 1900, he moved to Nome.

A lawyer and Democratic politician in the U.S. territory of Alaska, Cochran served as the mayor of Nome from 1910 to 1911, and served as the city attorney for Nome. He was elected to the Alaska Territorial House of Representatives, 5th regular session in 1921, and elected as a member of the Alaska Territorial Senate for the 13th to 18th sessions inclusive, regular sessions and the special session of 1946. Cochran was appointed to the board of University of Alaska in 1939, where he served until his death in 1948.
