= Clear Creek Township, Vernon County, Missouri =

Township in Vernon County, Missouri, U.S.

Coordinates: 37.8892°N 94.1233°W

Clear Creek Township is a township in Vernon County, in the U.S. state of Missouri.

Clear Creek Township was erected in the 1860s, taking its name from Clear Creek.
