= Deerfield Township, Vernon County, Missouri =

Township in Vernon County, Missouri, U.S.

Coordinates: 37.8086°N 94.4561°W

Deerfield Township is a township in Vernon County, in the U.S. state of Missouri.

Deerfield Township was erected in 1855, and named after the abundance of deer in the area.
