= Portia, Missouri =

Unincorporated community in Missouri, U.S.

Coordinates: 37°54′30″N 94°04′30″W

Portia is an unincorporated community in Vernon County, in the U.S. state of Missouri.

== History ==
A post office called Portia was established in 1894, and remained in operation until 1903. The community may be named after Portia, the heroine of William Shakespeare's The Merchant of Venice.
