= Metz, Missouri =

- Village
- Location of Metz, Missouri
- Coordinates: 37°59′47″N 94°26′35″W
- Country: United States
- State: Missouri
- County: Vernon
- Incorporated: 1907

Area
  - Total: 0.13 sq mi (0.33 km^{2})
  - Land: 0.13 sq mi (0.33 km^{2})
  - Water: 0 sq mi (0.00 km^{2})
- Elevation: 781 ft (238 m)

Population (2020)
  - Total: 22
  - Density: 173.4/sq mi (66.94/km^{2})
- Time zone: UTC-6 (Central (CST))
  - Summer (DST): UTC-5 (CDT)
- ZIP code: 64765
- Area code: 417
- FIPS code: 29-47612
- GNIS feature ID: 2396755

Metz is a village in Vernon County, Missouri, United States. The population was 49 at the 2010 census, at which time it was a town.

== History ==
A post office called Metz has been in operation since 1870. Metz was moved to its present site in the 19th century when railroad construction bypassed the original town site. The village's name commemorates the Siege of Metz (1870). An early variant name was "Pleasant Valley".

== Geography ==
Metz is located in northwest Vernon County approximately 1.5 miles north of the Little Osage River. It is at the intersection of Missouri routes MM and WW. Nevada is approximately eleven miles to the southeast.

According to the United States Census Bureau, the village has a total area of 0.13 square miles (0.34 km^{2}), all land.

== Demographics ==
Historical population
Census	Pop.	Note	%±
1900	159		—
1910	240		50.9%
1920	210		−12.5%
1930	185		−11.9%
1940	223		20.5%
1950	178		−20.2%
1960	137		−23.0%
1970	120		−12.4%
1980	136		13.3%
1990	91		−33.1%
2000	67		−26.4%
2010	49		−26.9%
2020	22		−55.1%
U.S. Decennial Census

As of 2000 the median income for a household in the town was $9,063, and the median income for a family was $18,000. Males had a median income of $18,750 versus $10,417 for females. The per capita income for the town was $6,940. There were 33.3% of families and 41.8% of the population living below the poverty line, including 44.4% of under eighteens and 41.7% of those over 64.

=== 2010 census ===
As of the census of 2010, there were 49 people, 22 households, and 15 families residing in the village. The population density was 376.9 inhabitants per square mile (145.5/km^{2}). There were 31 housing units at an average density of 238.5 per square mile (92.1/km^{2}). The racial makeup of the village was 93.9% White and 6.1% Native American.

There were 22 households, of which 27.3% had children under the age of 18 living with them, 50.0% were married couples living together, 9.1% had a female householder with no husband present, 9.1% had a male householder with no wife present, and 31.8% were non-families. 31.8% of all households were made up of individuals, and 9.1% had someone living alone who was 65 years of age or older. The average household size was 2.23 and the average family size was 2.80.

The median age in the village was 44.5 years. 22.4% of residents were under the age of 18; 14.3% were between the ages of 18 and 24; 14.2% were from 25 to 44; 32.6% were from 45 to 64; and 16.3% were 65 years of age or older. The gender makeup of the village was 55.1% male and 44.9% female.
