= Starks Creek =

Stream in the US state of Missouri

Starks Creek is a stream in Hickory County in the U.S. state of Missouri. It is a tributary of the Little Niangua River.

The stream headwaters arise in southeastern Hickory County southeast of Preston. The stream initially flows west then turns north just east of US Route 65. It crosses under US Route 54 just under one mile east of Preston then flows north-northeast passing under Missouri Route P just west of Jordan. To the north of Jordan the stream turns sharply to the southeast to enter the Little Niangua about one mile east of Jordan.

Source: 37°55′13″N 93°10′40″W; Confluence: 38°01′22″N 93°05′24″W

Starks Creek has the name of John Stark, a pioneer citizen.

== See also ==
- List of rivers of Missouri
