= Osage Township, Vernon County, Missouri =

Township in the U.S. state of Missouri

Coordinates: 37.9872°N 94.3433°W

Osage Township is a township in Vernon County, in the U.S. state of Missouri.

Osage Township was erected in 1855, taking its name from the Osage people.
