= Harwood, Missouri =

- Village
- Location of Harwood, Missouri
- Coordinates: 37°57′24″N 94°09′14″W
- Country: United States
- State: Missouri
- County: Vernon

Area
  - Total: 0.10 sq mi (0.27 km^{2})
  - Land: 0.10 sq mi (0.27 km^{2})
  - Water: 0 sq mi (0.00 km^{2})
- Elevation: 837 ft (255 m)

Population (2020)
  - Total: 29
  - Density: 275.9/sq mi (106.54/km^{2})
- Time zone: UTC-6 (Central (CST))
  - Summer (DST): UTC-5 (CDT)
- ZIP code: 64750
- Area code: 417
- FIPS code: 29-30862
- GNIS feature ID: 2398263

Harwood is a village in northeast Vernon County, Missouri, United States. As of the 2020 census, Harwood had a population of 29.

== History ==
Harwood had its start when the railroad was extended to that point. The town site was platted in 1882. The village was named for one Mr. Harwood, a local landowner. A post office has been in operation at Harwood since 1882.

== Geography ==
Harwood is located 13 miles northeast of Nevada and approximately 4.5 miles south-southeast of Schell City.

According to the United States Census Bureau, the village has a total area of 0.11 square miles (0.28 km^{2}), all land.

== Demographics ==
Historical population
| Census | Pop. | Note | %± |
|---|---|---|---|
| 1890 | 240 | | — |
| 1900 | 240 | | 0.0% |
| 1910 | 208 | | −13.3% |
| 1920 | 215 | | 3.4% |
| 1930 | 159 | | −26.0% |
| 1940 | 167 | | 5.0% |
| 1950 | 141 | | −15.6% |
| 1960 | 89 | | −36.9% |
| 1970 | 91 | | 2.2% |
| 1980 | 104 | | 14.3% |
| 1990 | 89 | | −14.4% |
| 2000 | 90 | | 1.1% |
| 2010 | 47 | | −47.8% |
| 2020 | 29 | | −38.3% |
U.S. Decennial Census

=== 2010 census ===
As of the census of 2010, there were 47 people, 19 households, and 12 families living in the village. The population density was 427.3 inhabitants per square mile (165.0/km^{2}). There were 34 housing units at an average density of 309.1 per square mile (119.3/km^{2}). The racial makeup of the village was 95.7% White and 4.3% Native American.

There were 19 households, of which 21.1% had children under the age of 18 living with them, 42.1% were married couples living together, 21.1% had a female householder with no husband present, and 36.8% were non-families. 26.3% of all households were made up of individuals, and 10.6% had someone living alone who was 65 years of age or older. The average household size was 2.47 and the average family size was 3.17.

The median age in the village was 46.5 years. 21.3% of residents were under the age of 18; 6.4% were between the ages of 18 and 24; 19.2% were from 25 to 44; 38.3% were from 45 to 64; and 14.9% were 65 years of age or older. The gender makeup of the village was 42.6% male and 57.4% female.

=== 2000 census ===
As of the census of 2000, there were 90 people, 37 households, and 23 families living in the village. The population density was 874.4 inhabitants per square mile (337.6/km^{2}). There were 45 housing units at an average density of 437.2 per square mile (168.8/km^{2}). The racial makeup of the village was 92.22% White, 3.33% Native American, and 4.44% from two or more races.

There were 37 households, out of which 21.6% had children under the age of 18 living with them, 54.1% were married couples living together, 5.4% had a female householder with no husband present, and 37.8% were non-families. 29.7% of all households were made up of individuals, and 10.8% had someone living alone who was 65 years of age or older. The average household size was 2.43 and the average family size was 3.13.

In the village, the population was spread out, with 21.1% under the age of 18, 6.7% from 18 to 24, 20.0% from 25 to 44, 31.1% from 45 to 64, and 21.1% who were 65 years of age or older. The median age was 48 years. For every 100 females, there were 109.3 males. For every 100 females age 18 and over, there were 97.2 males.

The median income for a household in the village was $21,250, and the median income for a family was $26,250. Males had a median income of $21,146 versus $11,250 for females. The per capita income for the village was $11,028. There were 9.1% of families and 15.8% of the population living below the poverty line, including 20.0% of under eighteens and none of those over 64.
