= Champ Clark Bridge (2019) =

Bridge in Missouri and Illinois, US

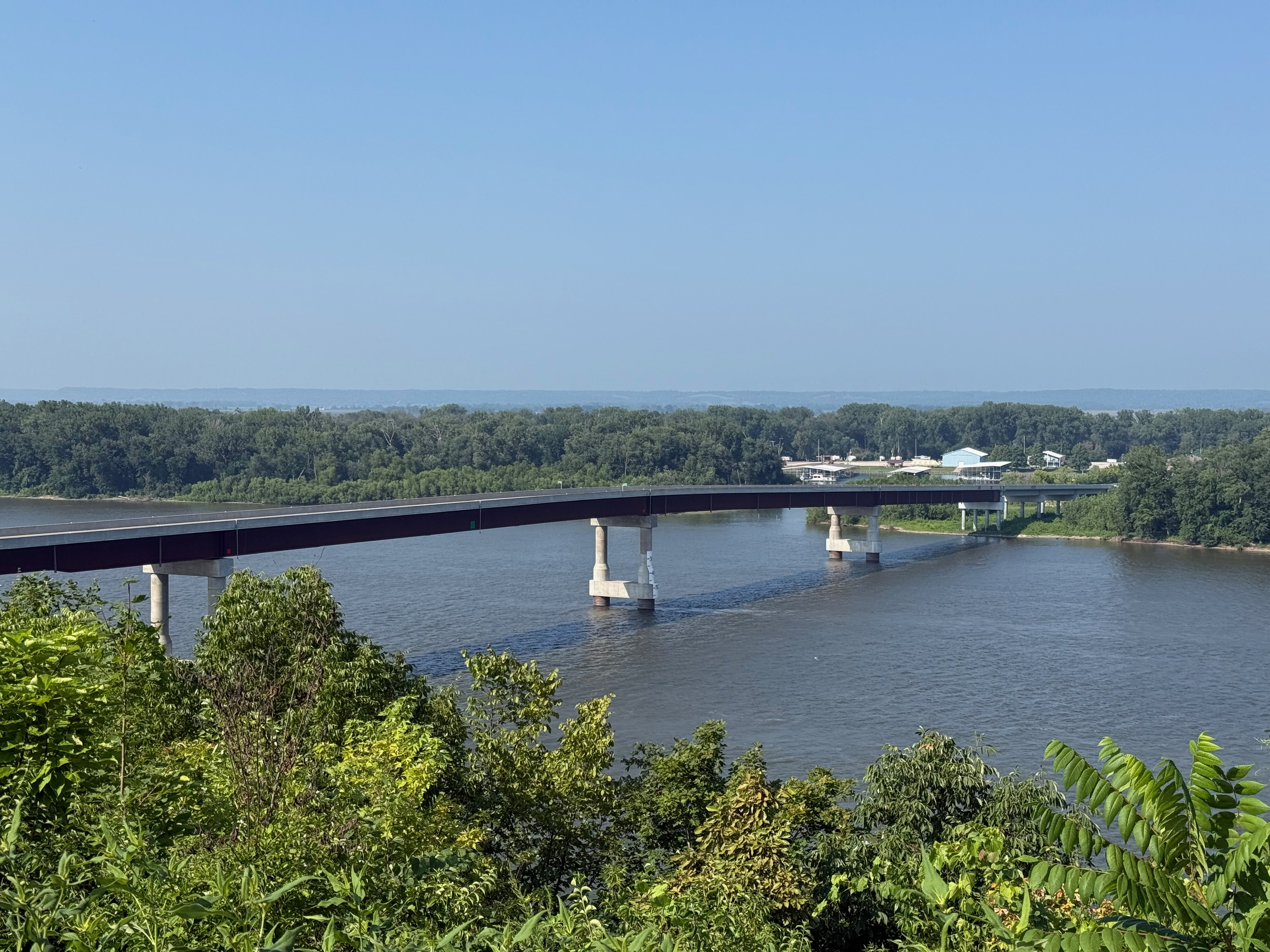
- Coordinates: 39°27′24″N 91°02′52″W
- Carries: 2 lanes of US 54
- Crosses: Mississippi River
- Locale: Louisiana, Missouri / Atlas Township, Pike County, Illinois
- Maintained by: Missouri Department of Transportation

Characteristics
- Design: Girder bridge
- Width: 44 feet (13 m)

History
- Opened: August 3, 2019

Statistics
- Daily traffic: 4,200

Location
- Interactive map of Champ Clark Bridge

The Champ Clark Bridge is a steel girder bridge over the Mississippi River connecting Louisiana, Missouri, with Pike County, Illinois.

It carries U.S. Route 54 northeast to Pittsfield, Illinois, where U.S. 54 terminates. It opened on August 3, 2019, replacing an older bridge of the same name.

== History ==
The bridge is named after James Beauchamp Clark, a former Speaker of the House from Bowling Green, Missouri. Clark served as Speaker from 1911 to 1919.

The original bridge had opened in 1928 and had, over the years, grown functionally obsolete and structurally deficient. Its replacement was the current bridge, completed in 2019.

== Design and construction ==
The new bridge was designed by HNTB and constructed by Massman Construction Co., both of Kansas City, MO. It was completed under a design-build contract, where both companies performed their work under a single contract with the owner.

== See also ==
- List of crossings of the Upper Mississippi River
