= Sheldon, Missouri =

City in Vernon County, Missouri, United States

- City
- Location of Sheldon, Missouri
- Coordinates: 37°39′30″N 94°17′45″W
- Country: United States
- State: Missouri
- County: Vernon

Area
  - Total: 0.53 sq mi (1.36 km^{2})
  - Land: 0.53 sq mi (1.36 km^{2})
  - Water: 0 sq mi (0.00 km^{2})
- Elevation: 912 ft (278 m)

Population (2020)
  - Total: 435
  - Density: 828.2/sq mi (319.78/km^{2})
- Time zone: UTC-6 (Central (CST))
  - Summer (DST): UTC-5 (CDT)
- ZIP code: 64784
- Area code: 417
- FIPS code: 29-67214
- GNIS feature ID: 2395869

Sheldon is a city in southern Vernon County, Missouri, United States. As of the 2020 census, Sheldon had a population of 435.

== History ==
Sheldon was platted in 1881 when the railroad was extended to that point. The city was named for Sheldon A. Wright (or Wight), the owner of the town site. A post office has been in operation at Sheldon since 1881.

== Geography ==
Sheldon is located in south-central Vernon County one mile north of the Vernon-Barton county line. It is on Missouri Route B one mile east of US Route 71. Lamar is ten miles to the south and Nevada is eleven miles to the north along Route 71.

According to the United States Census Bureau, the city has a total area of 0.53 square miles (1.37 km^{2}), all land.

== Demographics ==
Historical population
Census	Pop.	Note	%±
1890	396		—
1900	474		19.7%
1910	528		11.4%
1920	544		3.0%
1930	456		−16.2%
1940	463		1.5%
1950	427		−7.8%
1960	434		1.6%
1970	498		14.7%
1980	491		−1.4%
1990	464		−5.5%
2000	529		14.0%
2010	543		2.6%
2020	435		−19.9%
U.S. Decennial Census

=== 2010 census ===
As of the census of 2010, there were 543 people, 208 households, and 128 families living in the city. The population density was 1,024.5 inhabitants per square mile (395.6/km^{2}). There were 238 housing units at an average density of 449.1 per square mile (173.4/km^{2}). The racial makeup of the city was 94.3% White, 0.2% African American, 0.9% Native American, 1.3% from other races, and 3.3% from two or more races. Hispanic or Latino of any race were 6.8% of the population.

There were 208 households, of which 34.6% had children under the age of 18 living with them, 41.3% were married couples living together, 13.9% had a female householder with no husband present, 6.3% had a male householder with no wife present, and 38.5% were non-families. 30.3% of all households were made up of individuals, and 12.9% had someone living alone who was 65 years of age or older. The average household size was 2.61 and the average family size was 3.25.

The median age in the city was 33.8 years. 27.1% of residents were under the age of 18; 10.2% were between the ages of 18 and 24; 26.3% were from 25 to 44; 23.9% were from 45 to 64; and 12.3% were 65 years of age or older. The gender makeup of the city was 48.4% male and 51.6% female.

=== 2000 census ===
As of the census of 2000, there were 529 people, 209 households, and 146 families living in the city. The population density was 1,034.9 inhabitants per square mile (399.6/km^{2}). There were 232 housing units at an average density of 453.9 per square mile (175.3/km^{2}). The racial makeup of the city was 99.24% White, 0.19% Native American, 0.19% Pacific Islander, and 0.38% from two or more races.

There were 209 households, out of which 31.1% had children under the age of 18 living with them, 58.9% were married couples living together, 9.1% had a female householder with no husband present, and 30.1% were non-families. 26.3% of all households were made up of individuals, and 13.9% had someone living alone who was 65 years of age or older. The average household size was 2.49 and the average family size was 3.03.

In the city, the population was spread out, with 26.7% under the age of 18, 8.3% from 18 to 24, 27.8% from 25 to 44, 19.3% from 45 to 64, and 18.0% who were 65 years of age or older. The median age was 38 years. For every 100 females there were 81.2 males. For every 100 females age 18 and over, there were 85.6 males.

The median income for a household in the city was $28,125, and the median income for a family was $34,286. Males had a median income of $22,404 versus $18,750 for females. The per capita income for the city was $13,664. About 6.2% of families and 13.4% of the population were below the poverty line, including 19.7% of those under age 18 and 11.9% of those age 65 or over.

== Education ==
Public education in Sheldon is administered by Sheldon R-VIII School District.

Sheldon has a public library, the Sheldon City Library.

== See also ==
- List of cities in Missouri
