= Champ Clark Bridge (1928) =

Former bridge over the Mississippi River

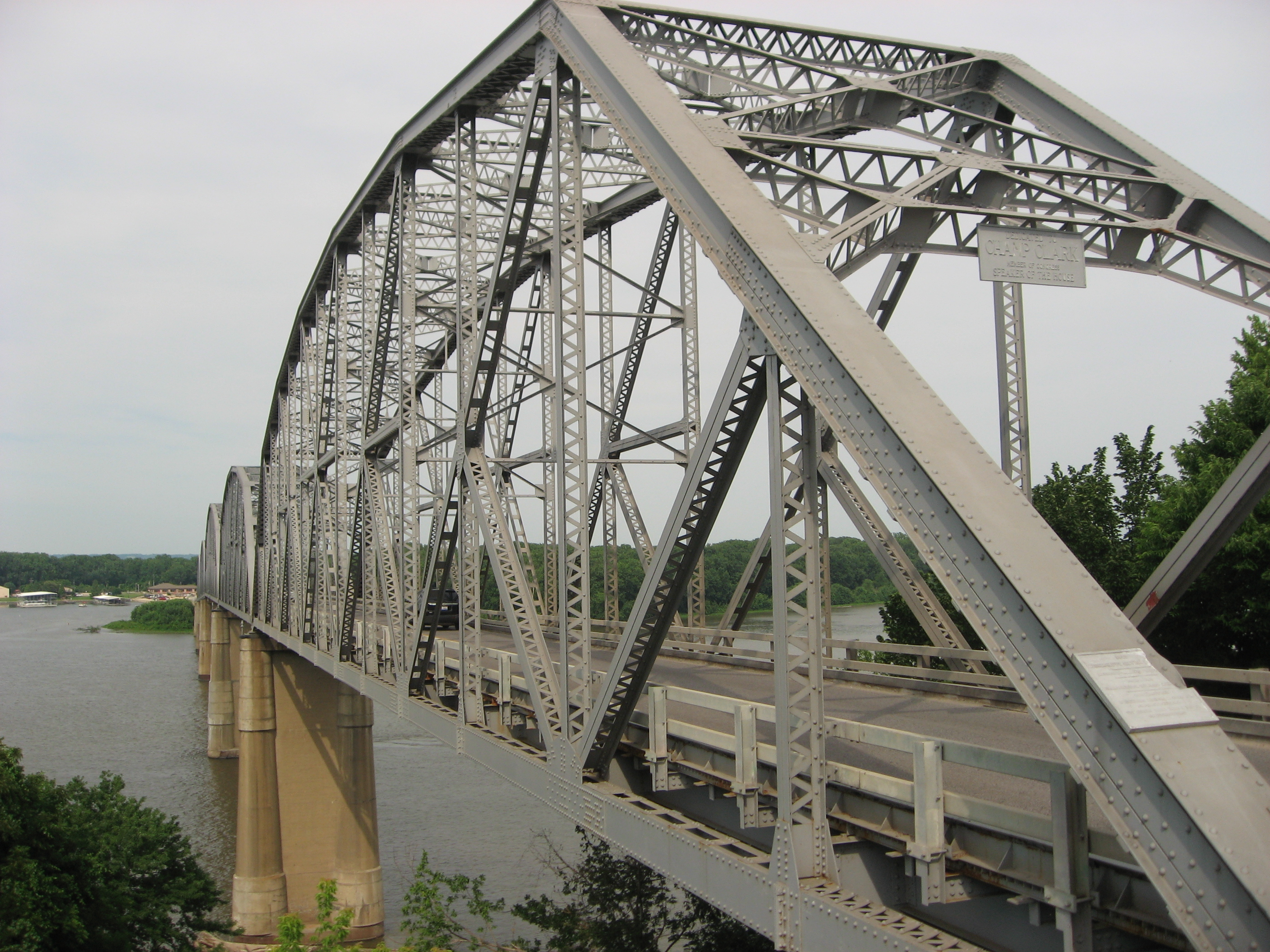
- The Champ Clark Bridge looking east
- Coordinates: 39°27′24″N 91°02′52″W
- Carries: US 54
- Crosses: Mississippi River
- Locale: Louisiana, Missouri / Atlas Township, Pike County, Illinois

Characteristics
- Design: Truss bridge
- Total length: 2,286 feet (697 m)
- Width: 20 feet (6 m)
- Longest span: 418 feet (127 m)

History
- Opened: June 9, 1928
- Closed: August 3, 2019

Location
- Interactive map of Champ Clark Bridge

The Champ Clark Bridge was a five-span truss bridge over the Mississippi River connecting Louisiana, Missouri with the state of Illinois via US 54. It opened in 1928. In 2019, the bridge was replaced by a new bridge of the same name.

== History ==
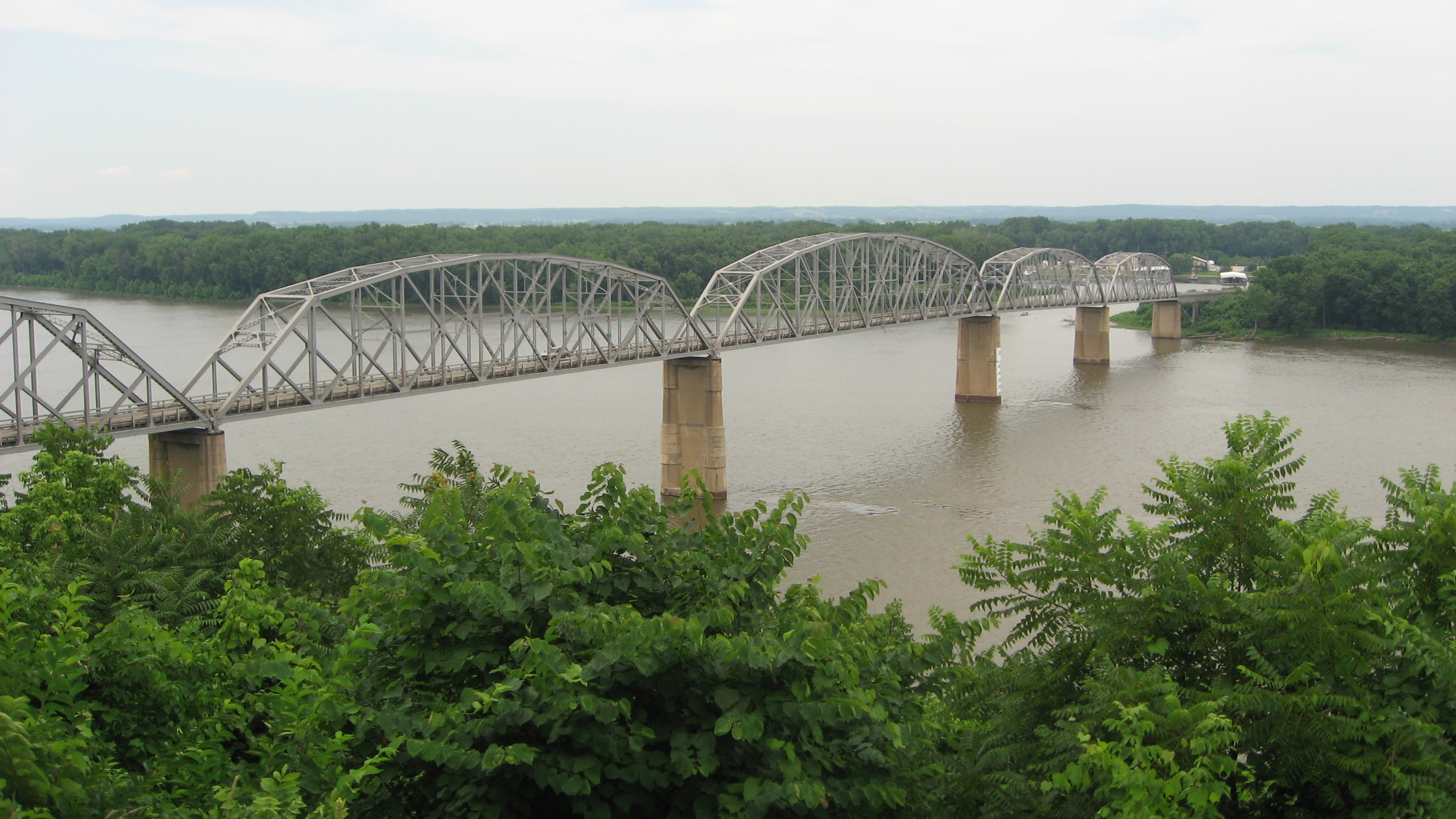
Overhead view from a Louisiana city park on top of the bluffs

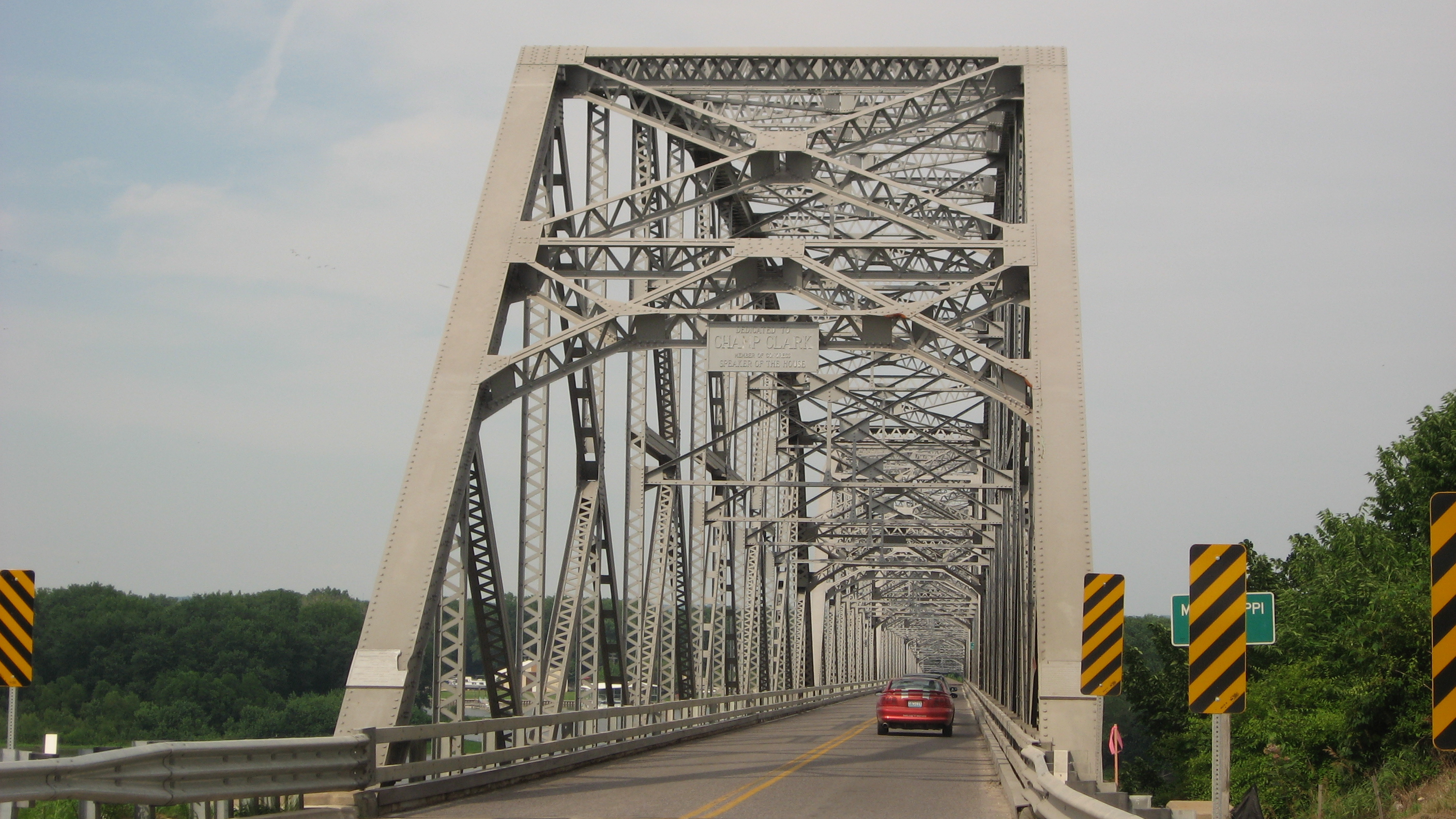
Another view looking east

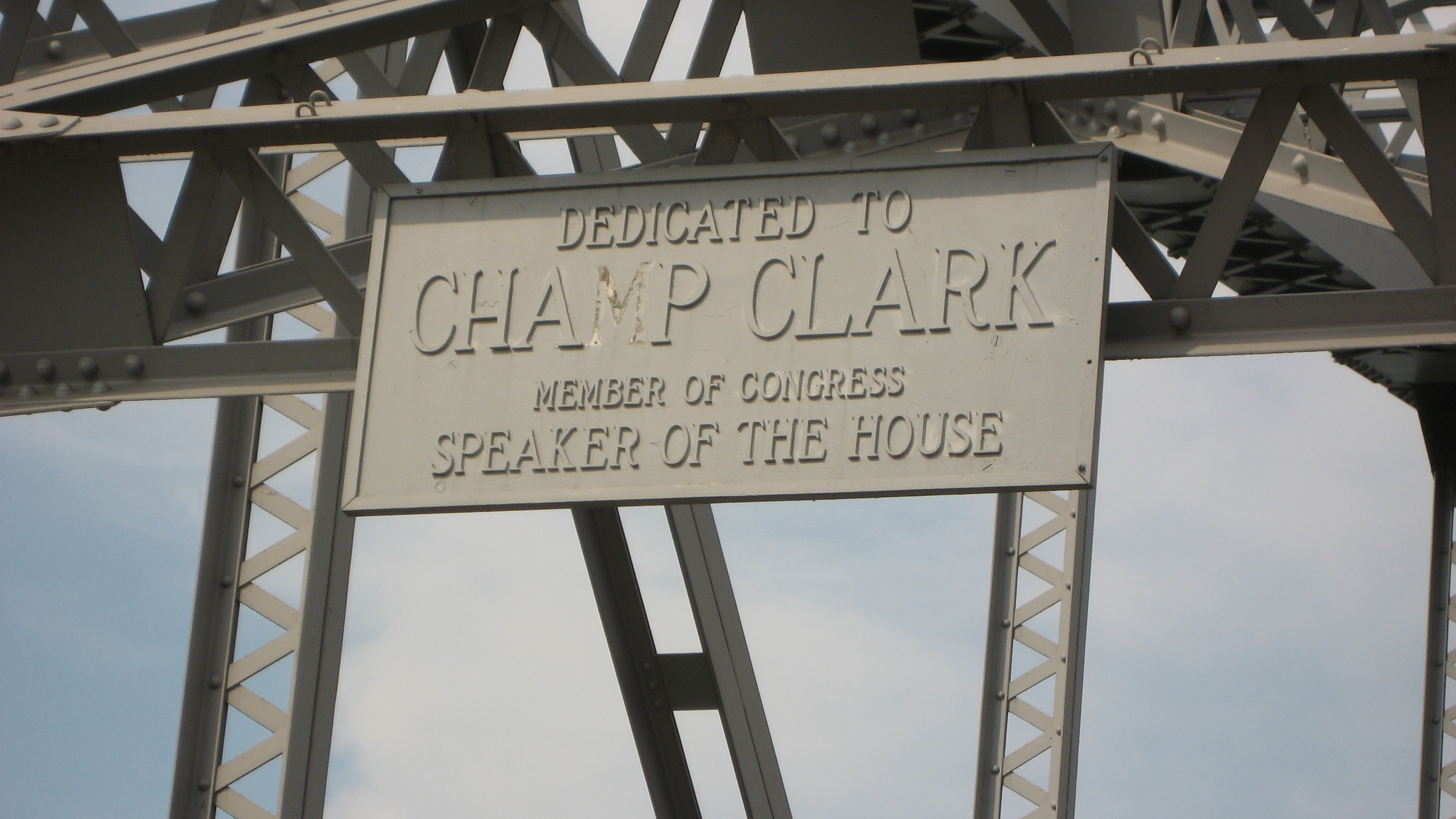
The overhead plaque

Champ Clark Bridge was formerly a toll bridge.

The bridge was named after James Beauchamp Clark, a former Speaker of the House from Bowling Green, Missouri. Clark served as Speaker from 1911 to 1919.

During construction, a span of the bridge collapsed on September 6, 1927, due to faulty false work. The second span from the Missouri shore collapsed without warning just after quitting time. Two workmen were still on the span resulting in one fatality and one serious injury. This span collapse caused the failure of the first company formed to finance construction of the bridge, delaying completion for at least one year.

The bridge was designed by Harrington, Howard and Ash, with construction being completed by the Missouri Valley Bridge and Iron Co. of Leavenworth, KS, and Wisconsin Bridge and Iron Co. of Milwaukee, Wisconsin.

The bridge was narrow, allowing for two lanes of traffic on a deck that was only 20 feet (6 m) wide. The bridge, originally painted silver, was repainted deep green in 1983, and repaired in 1999. In 2005, the Missouri Department of Transportation again rehabbed and repainted the bridge, replacing the green color of the bridge with gray. The bridge is 2,286.4 feet (697 m) in length. The span over the main channel of the Mississippi River is 418.5 feet (128 m) in length.

In 2013, MoDOT heightened restrictions on oversized loads on the bridge, citing its age and width. Pull-off areas were constructed, and all wide/oversized loads were required to pull over and call the Louisiana police department for an escort. In 2014, a legal weight limit of 40 tons was put into place and the speed limit was reduced to 30 mph, due to accelerated deterioration. Until its replacement bridge opened, MoDOT affirmed that the bridge was safe to travel so long as motorists complied with the posted weight and speed limits.

== Replacement ==
In 2015, MoDOT and IDOT were jointly awarded a federal TIGER grant to replace the bridge and reduce the cost to each state, and Illinois committed its share. In 2016, MoDOT announced inclusion of funding for its portion of the bridge replacement cost in its draft five-year plan. The new bridge opened on August 3, 2019, and retained the name of the old span. The old bridge was demolished in late 2019.

== See also ==
- List of crossings of the Upper Mississippi River
