= Moundville, Missouri =

- Village
- Location of Moundville, Missouri
- Coordinates: 37°45′53″N 94°27′03″W
- Country: United States
- State: Missouri
- County: Vernon
- Incorporated: 1882

Area
  - Total: 0.16 sq mi (0.42 km^{2})
  - Land: 0.16 sq mi (0.42 km^{2})
  - Water: 0 sq mi (0.00 km^{2})
- Elevation: 856 ft (261 m)

Population (2020)
  - Total: 78
  - Density: 481.3/sq mi (185.82/km^{2})
- Time zone: UTC-6 (Central (CST))
  - Summer (DST): UTC-5 (CDT)
- ZIP code: 64771
- Area code: 417
- FIPS code: 29-50330
- GNIS feature ID: 2396785

Moundville is a village in southwest Vernon County, Missouri, United States. The population was 124 at the 2010 census.

== History ==
Moundville was platted in 1869. The village was so named on account of a natural mound near the original town site. A post office called Mounds was established in 1870, and the name was changed to Moundville in 1886.

== Geography ==
Moundville is located along Missouri Route 43 approximately 4.5 miles north of Bronaugh and six miles southwest of Nevada.

According to the United States Census Bureau, the village has a total area of 0.16 square miles (0.41 km^{2}), all land.

== Demographics ==
Historical population
Census	Pop.	Note	%±
1880	85		—
1890	219		157.6%
1900	287		31.1%
1910	247		−13.9%
1920	240		−2.8%
1930	243		1.3%
1940	247		1.6%
1950	168		−32.0%
1960	136		−19.0%
1970	149		9.6%
1980	149		0.0%
1990	140		−6.0%
2000	103		−26.4%
2010	124		20.4%
2020	78		−37.1%
U.S. Decennial Census

=== 2010 census ===
As of the census of 2010, there were 124 people, 49 households, and 35 families living in the village. The population density was 775.0 inhabitants per square mile (299.2/km^{2}). There were 57 housing units at an average density of 356.3 per square mile (137.6/km^{2}). The racial makeup of the village was 97.6% White, 0.8% from other races, and 1.6% from two or more races. Hispanic or Latino of any race were 2.4% of the population.

There were 49 households, of which 32.7% had children under the age of 18 living with them, 55.1% were married couples living together, 10.2% had a female householder with no husband present, 6.1% had a male householder with no wife present, and 28.6% were non-families. 22.4% of all households were made up of individuals, and 10.2% had someone living alone who was 65 years of age or older. The average household size was 2.53 and the average family size was 2.97.

The median age in the village was 40 years. 24.2% of residents were under the age of 18; 4.9% were between the ages of 18 and 24; 21.8% were from 25 to 44; 31.5% were from 45 to 64; and 17.7% were 65 years of age or older. The gender makeup of the village was 54.0% male and 46.0% female.

=== 2000 census ===
As of the census of 2000, there were 103 people, 49 households, and 31 families living in the town. The population density was 620.6 inhabitants per square mile (239.6/km^{2}). There were 59 housing units at an average density of 355.5 per square mile (137.3/km^{2}). The racial makeup of the town was 98.06% White and 1.94% Native American.

There were 49 households, out of which 22.4% had children under the age of 18 living with them, 57.1% were married couples living together, 4.1% had a female householder with no husband present, and 34.7% were non-families. 32.7% of all households were made up of individuals, and 22.4% had someone living alone who was 65 years of age or older. The average household size was 2.10 and the average family size was 2.63.

In the town the population was spread out, with 17.5% under the age of 18, 5.8% from 18 to 24, 29.1% from 25 to 44, 25.2% from 45 to 64, and 22.3% who were 65 years of age or older. The median age was 44 years. For every 100 females, there were 123.9 males. For every 100 females age 18 and over, there were 112.5 males.

The median income for a household in the town was $25,625, and the median income for a family was $31,875. Males had a median income of $28,750 versus $14,107 for females. The per capita income for the town was $14,051. There were no families and 2.1% of the population living below the poverty line, including no under eighteens and 7.1% of those over 64.
