= Stotesbury, Missouri =

- Village
- Location of Stotesbury, Missouri
- Coordinates: 37°58′28″N 94°33′52″W
- Country: United States
- State: Missouri
- County: Vernon
- Incorporated: 1894

Area
  - Total: 0.11 sq mi (0.29 km^{2})
  - Land: 0.11 sq mi (0.29 km^{2})
  - Water: 0 sq mi (0.00 km^{2})
- Elevation: 791 ft (241 m)

Population (2020)
  - Total: 12
  - Density: 108.9/sq mi (42.04/km^{2})
- Time zone: UTC-6 (Central (CST))
  - Summer (DST): UTC-5 (CDT)
- FIPS code: 29-70954
- GNIS feature ID: 2397684

Stotesbury is a village in northwest Vernon County, Missouri, United States. The population was 18 at the 2010 census.

== History ==
Stotesbury was platted in 1893 when the railroad was extended to that point. The village was named for E. T. Stotesbury, a railroad agent. A post office was established at Stotesbury in 1893, and remained in operation until 1985.

In addition to the post office, Stotesbury also had a two story school. In 1990 the remaining portion of the building was demolished with only the foundation walls and the basement remaining. Stotesbury at one time had an operational black smith forge located near the railroad tracks and the coal yard.

== Geography ==
Stotesbury is located at the intersection of Missouri routes D and V. The Missouri-Kansas state line is approximately 2.5 miles west and the Little Osage River flows past one-half mile north. The community of Richards is four miles south and Nevada is fourteen miles to the southeast.

According to the United States Census Bureau, the village has a total area of 0.11 square miles (0.28 km^{2}), all land.

== Demographics ==
Historical population
Census	Pop.	Note	%±
1900	154		—
1910	159		3.2%
1920	141		−11.3%
1930	113		−19.9%
1940	102		−9.7%
1950	71		−30.4%
1960	64		−9.9%
1970	35		−45.3%
1980	48		37.1%
1990	42		−12.5%
2000	43		2.4%
2010	18		−58.1%
2020	12		−33.3%
U.S. Decennial Census

=== 2010 census ===
As of the census of 2010, there were 18 people, 7 households, and 6 families living in the village. The population density was 163.6 inhabitants per square mile (63.2/km^{2}). There were 12 housing units at an average density of 109.1 per square mile (42.1/km^{2}). The racial makeup of the village was 100.0% White.

There were 7 households, of which 14.3% had children under the age of 18 living with them, 71.4% were married couples living together, 14.3% had a female householder with no husband present, and 14.3% were non-families. 14.3% of all households were made up of individuals. The average household size was 2.57 and the average family size was 2.67.

The median age in the village was 54 years. 5.6% of residents were under the age of 18; 0% were between the ages of 18 and 24; 22.3% were from 25 to 44; 38.9% were from 45 to 64; and 33.3% were 65 years of age or older. The gender makeup of the village was 55.6% male and 44.4% female.

=== 2000 census ===
As of the census of 2000, there were 43 people, 14 households, and 11 families living in the town. The population density was 382.4 inhabitants per square mile (147.6/km^{2}). There were 15 housing units at an average density of 133.4 per square mile (51.5/km^{2}). The racial makeup of the town was 100.00% White.

There were 14 households, out of which 42.9% had children under the age of 18 living with them, 57.1% were married couples living together, 28.6% had a female householder with no husband present, and 14.3% were non-families. 14.3% of all households were made up of individuals, and 7.1% had someone living alone who was 65 years of age or older. The average household size was 3.07 and the average family size was 3.25.

In the town the population was spread out, with 32.6% under the age of 18, 2.3% from 18 to 24, 23.3% from 25 to 44, 25.6% from 45 to 64, and 16.3% who were 65 years of age or older. The median age was 40 years. For every 100 females, there were 126.3 males. For every 100 females age 18 and over, there were 93.3 males.

The median income for a household in the town was $23,438, and the median income for a family was $17,083. Males had a median income of $21,250 versus $28,750 for females. The per capita income for the town was $9,543. There were 22.2% of families and 19.0% of the population living below the poverty line, including 26.7% of under eighteens and none of those over 64.
