= Bronaugh, Missouri =

- City
- Location of Bronaugh, Missouri
- Coordinates: 37°41′39″N 94°28′05″W
- Country: United States
- State: Missouri
- County: Vernon

Area
  - Total: 0.29 sq mi (0.75 km^{2})
  - Land: 0.29 sq mi (0.74 km^{2})
  - Water: 0.0039 sq mi (0.01 km^{2})
- Elevation: 899 ft (274 m)

Population (2020)
  - Total: 163
  - Density: 571.6/sq mi (220.71/km^{2})
- Time zone: UTC-6 (Central (CST))
  - Summer (DST): UTC-5 (CDT)
- ZIP code: 64728
- Area code: 417
- FIPS code: 29-08614
- GNIS feature ID: 2393422

Bronaugh is a city in southwest Vernon County, Missouri, United States. As of the 2020 census, Bronaugh had a population of 163.

== History ==
Bronaugh was platted in 1886 when the Nevada and Minden Railway was extended to that point. The community was named for W. C. Bronaugh, the original owner of the town site. A post office has been in operation at Bronaugh since 1886. The city was incorporated in 1897.

== Geography ==
Bronaugh is located on Missouri Route 43 approximately ten miles south-southwest of Nevada and five miles south of the community of Moundville. The Bushwacker Lake Conservation Area is two miles to the southeast.

According to the United States Census Bureau, the city has a total area of 0.29 square miles (0.75 km^{2}), all land.

== Demographics ==
Historical population
| Census | Pop. | Note | %± |
|---|---|---|---|
| 1890 | 148 | | — |
| 1900 | 190 | | 28.4% |
| 1910 | 263 | | 38.4% |
| 1920 | 285 | | 8.4% |
| 1930 | 192 | | −32.6% |
| 1940 | 265 | | 38.0% |
| 1950 | 214 | | −19.2% |
| 1960 | 173 | | −19.2% |
| 1970 | 203 | | 17.3% |
| 1980 | 209 | | 3.0% |
| 1990 | 211 | | 1.0% |
| 2000 | 245 | | 16.1% |
| 2010 | 249 | | 1.6% |
| 2020 | 163 | | −34.5% |
U.S. Decennial Census

=== 2010 census ===
As of the census of 2010, there were 249 people, 83 households, and 64 families living in the city. The population density was 858.6 inhabitants per square mile (331.5/km^{2}). There were 107 housing units at an average density of 369.0 per square mile (142.5/km^{2}). The racial makeup of the city was 96.0% White, 0.4% African American, 0.4% Asian, and 3.2% from two or more races. Hispanic or Latino of any race were 1.6% of the population.

There were 83 households, of which 39.8% had children under the age of 18 living with them, 59.0% were married couples living together, 10.8% had a female householder with no husband present, 7.2% had a male householder with no wife present, and 22.9% were non-families. 15.7% of all households were made up of individuals, and 4.8% had someone living alone who was 65 years of age or older. The average household size was 3.00 and the average family size was 3.38.

The median age in the city was 31.3 years. 33.7% of residents were under the age of 18; 6.7% were between the ages of 18 and 24; 28.4% were from 25 to 44; 21.6% were from 45 to 64; and 9.2% were 65 years of age or older. The gender makeup of the city was 49.0% male and 51.0% female.

=== 2000 census ===
As of the census of 2000, there were 245 people, 93 households, and 65 families living in the city. The population density was 863.1 inhabitants per square mile (333.2/km^{2}). There were 103 housing units at an average density of 362.9 per square mile (140.1/km^{2}). The racial makeup of the city was 97.96% White, 0.41% Native American, and 1.63% from two or more races.

There were 93 households, out of which 40.9% had children under the age of 18 living with them, 59.1% were married couples living together, 9.7% had a female householder with no husband present, and 30.1% were non-families. 29.0% of all households were made up of individuals, and 17.2% had someone living alone who was 65 years of age or older. The average household size was 2.63 and the average family size was 3.28.

In the city the population was spread out, with 31.0% under the age of 18, 6.9% from 18 to 24, 31.0% from 25 to 44, 17.6% from 45 to 64, and 13.5% who were 65 years of age or older. The median age was 31 years. For every 100 females there were 102.5 males. For every 100 females age 18 and over, there were 79.8 males.

The median income for a household in the city was $26,786, and the median income for a family was $40,625. Males had a median income of $23,542 versus $18,750 for females. The per capita income for the city was $13,073. About 2.7% of families and 7.2% of the population were below the poverty line, including 2.7% of those under the age of eighteen and 24.2% of those 65 or over.
