= Montevallo, Missouri =

Unincorporated community in Vernon County, Missouri, United States

Coordinates: 37°43′34″N 94°06′30″W

Montevallo is an unincorporated community in southeast Vernon County, Missouri, United States. The community is on Missouri Route E between Milo (10 miles west) and Olympia four miles to the east in adjacent Cedar County. Nevada is approximately 16 miles to the northeast.

== History ==
Montevallo was platted in the 1850s. The community was severely damaged during the Civil War. The original town site, located approximately one and one-half miles northwest of the present town, is now known as "Old Montevallo". The entire town was moved to its present location sometime after the Civil War. A post office was established at Montevallo in 1858, and remained in operation until being discontinued in 1968. Montevallo is derived from Italian words for the hill in the valley.

== Demographics ==
Historical population
Census	Pop.	Note	%±
1900	157		—
1910	146		−7.0%
1920	130		−11.0%
1930	78		−40.0%
1940	69		−11.5%
1950	53		−23.2%
1960	50		−5.7%
1970	54		8.0%
Missouri Census Data Center
