= Vernon County, Missouri =

County in Missouri, United States

- County
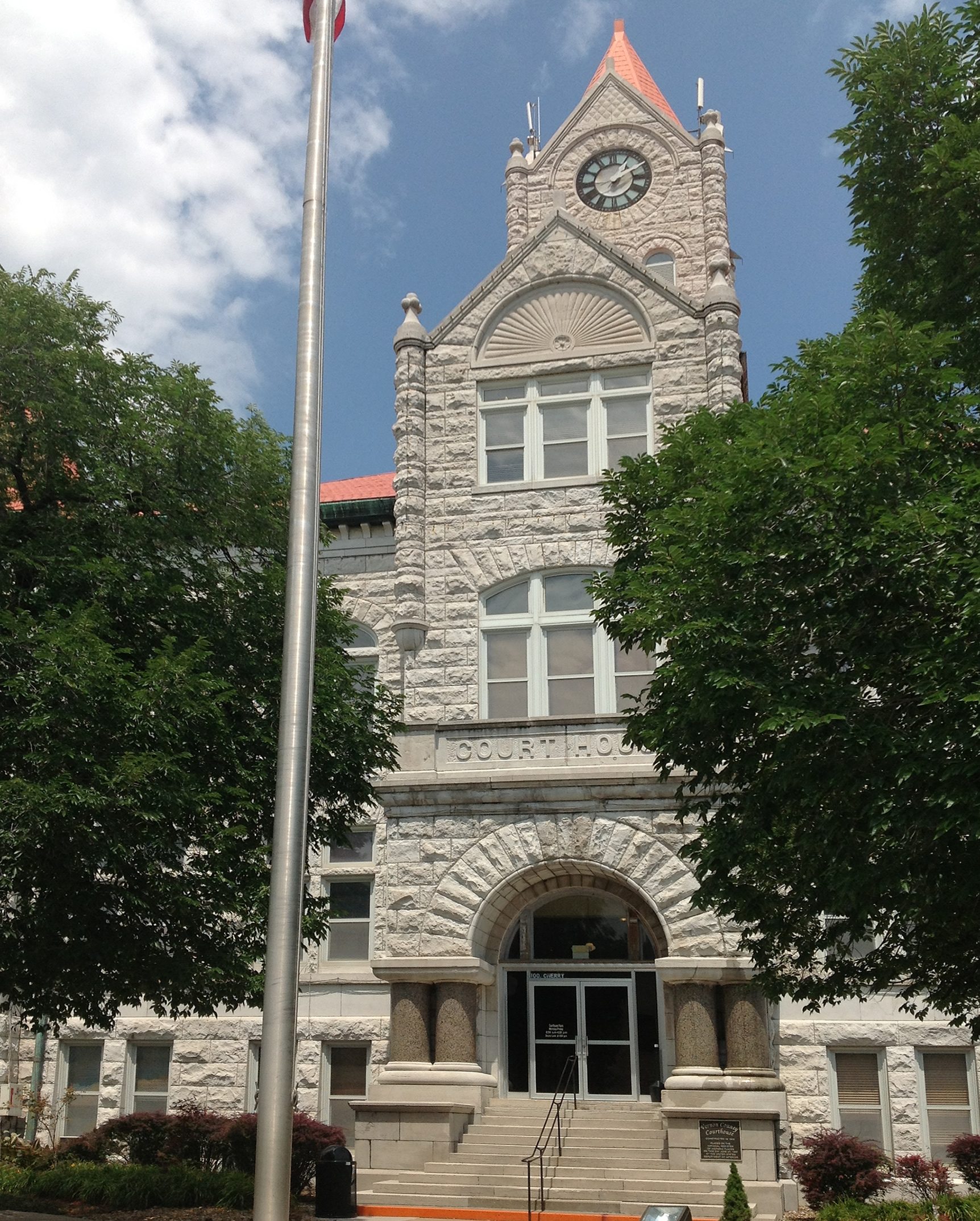
- Vernon County Courthouse

- Location within the U.S. state of Missouri
- Coordinates: 37°51′N 94°20′W
- Country: United States
- State: Missouri
- Founded: February 27, 1855
- Named for: Colonel Miles Vernon, state senator, and veteran of the Battle of New Orleans
- Seat: Nevada
- Largest city: Nevada

Area
  - Total: 837 sq mi (2,170 km^{2})
  - Land: 826 sq mi (2,140 km^{2})
  - Water: 10 sq mi (26 km^{2}) 1.2%

Population (2020)
  - Total: 19,707
  - Estimate (2025): 19,946 ▲
  - Density: 23.9/sq mi (9.21/km^{2})
- Time zone: UTC−6 (Central)
  - Summer (DST): UTC−5 (CDT)
- Congressional district: 4th
- Website: vernoncountymo.org

Vernon County is a county located in the western region of the U.S. state of Missouri, on the border with Kansas. As of the 2020 census, the population was 19,707. Its county seat is Nevada. The county was organized on February 27, 1855, considerably later than counties in the eastern part of the state. It was named for Colonel Miles Vernon (1786–1867), a state senator and veteran of the Battle of New Orleans. This area was part of the large historic territory of the Osage Nation of Native Americans.

== History ==
The county was developed by European Americans for agriculture and is still mostly rural.

Vernon County suffered considerable damage during the American Civil War. Guerrillas and insurgents had waged raids against Union troops and carried out personal vendettas in the county. On May 23, 1863, Union Army soldiers burned the county seat of Nevada, along with the courthouse, in retaliation. The present courthouse was completed in 1907.

Vernon County was one of four Missouri counties that were wholly depopulated by Union General Thomas Ewing Jr.'s General Order No. 11 (1863), which ordered the people evacuated to end support for Confederate guerrillas operating in the area. Most of the residents were not allowed to return to their homes until after the Civil War ended in May 1865.

== Geography ==
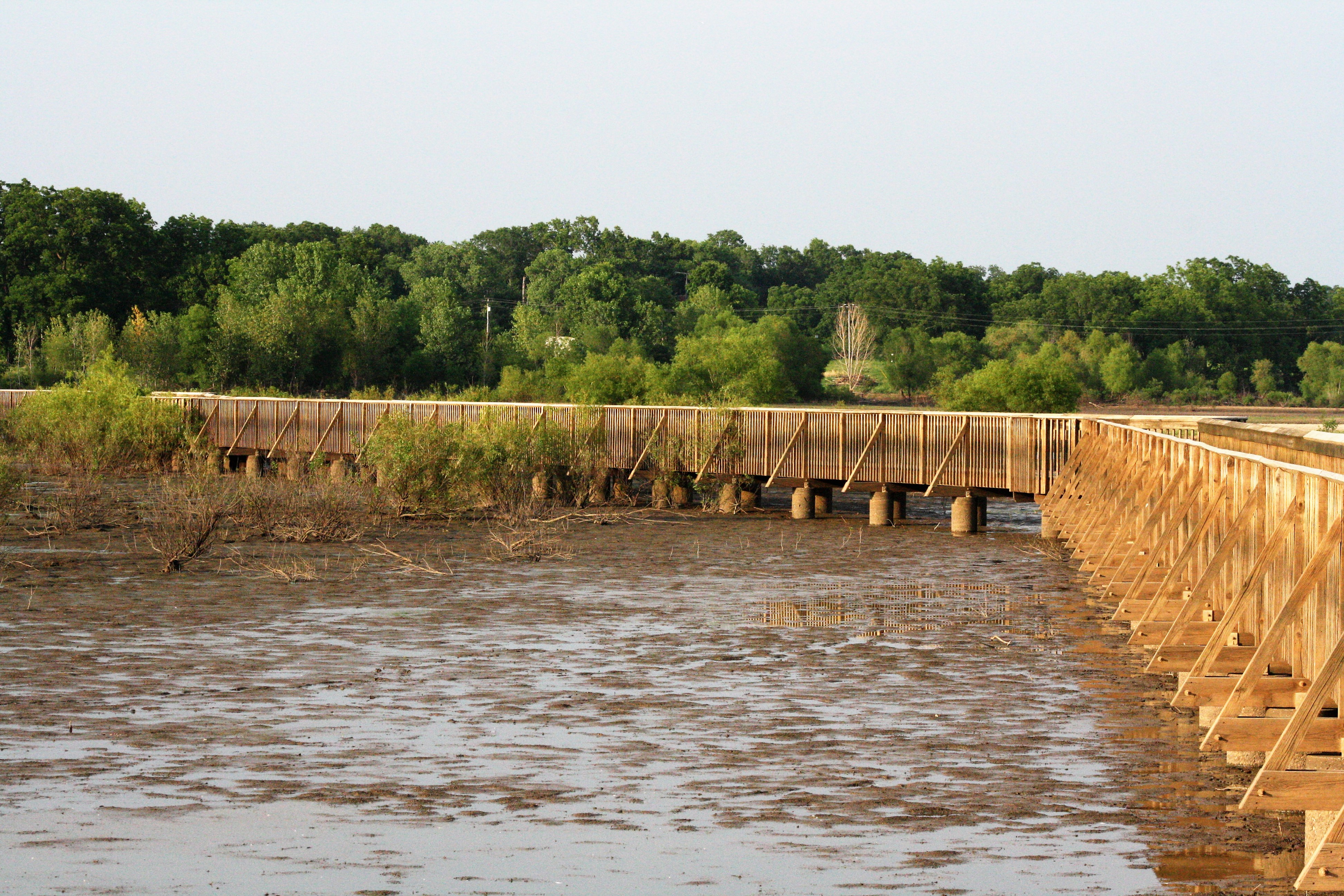
A boardwalk allows visitors to explore a restored wetland at Four Rivers Conservation Area in northern Vernon County

According to the U.S. Census Bureau, the county has a total area of 837 square miles (2,170 km^{2}), of which 826 square miles (2,140 km^{2}) is land and 10 square miles (26 km^{2}) (1.2%) is water.

=== Adjacent counties ===
- Bates County (north)
- St. Clair County (northeast)
- Cedar County (east)
- Barton County (south)
- Crawford County, Kansas (southwest)
- Bourbon County, Kansas (west)
- Linn County, Kansas (northwest)

=== Major highways ===
- Interstate 49
- U.S. Route 54
- U.S. Route 71
- Route 43

=== Transit ===
- Jefferson Lines

== Demographics ==
Historical population
Census	Pop.	Note	%±
1860	4,850		—
1870	11,247		131.9%
1880	19,369		72.2%
1890	31,505		62.7%
1900	31,619		0.4%
1910	28,827		−8.8%
1920	26,069		−9.6%
1930	25,031		−4.0%
1940	25,586		2.2%
1950	22,685		−11.3%
1960	20,540		−9.5%
1970	19,065		−7.2%
1980	19,806		3.9%
1990	19,041		−3.9%
2000	20,454		7.4%
2010	21,159		3.4%
2020	19,707		−6.9%
2025 (est.)	19,946	▲	1.2%
U.S. Decennial Census; 1790-1960 1900-1990; 1990-2000 2010

=== Racial and ethnic composition ===
Vernon County, Missouri – Racial and ethnic composition Note: the US Census treats Hispanic/Latino as an ethnic category. This table excludes Latinos from the racial categories and assigns them to a separate category. Hispanics/Latinos may be of any race.
Race / Ethnicity (NH = Non-Hispanic)	Pop 1980	Pop 1990	Pop 2000	Pop 2010	Pop 2020	% 1980	% 1990	% 2000	% 2010	% 2020
White alone (NH)	19,465	18,703	19,742	20,197	17,966	98.28%	98.22%	96.52%	95.45%	91.17%
Black or African American alone (NH)	37	59	125	100	110	0.19%	0.31%	0.61%	0.47%	0.56%
Native American or Alaska Native alone (NH)	103	108	160	141	131	0.52%	0.57%	0.78%	0.67%	0.66%
Asian alone (NH)	86	65	63	103	103	0.43%	0.34%	0.31%	0.49%	0.52%
Native Hawaiian or Pacific Islander alone (NH)	x	x	6	8	18	x	x	0.03%	0.04%	0.09%
Other race alone (NH)	9	4	12	4	52	0.05%	0.02%	0.06%	0.02%	0.26%
Mixed race or Multiracial (NH)	x	x	174	270	901	x	x	0.85%	1.28%	4.57%
Hispanic or Latino (any race)	106	102	172	336	426	0.54%	0.54%	0.84%	1.59%	2.16%
Total	19,806	19,041	20,454	21,159	19,707	100.00%	100.00%	100.00%	100.00%	100.00%

=== 2020 census ===
As of the 2020 census, the county had a population of 19,707. The median age was 40.1 years; 24.2% of residents were under the age of 18 and 19.8% were 65 years of age or older. For every 100 females there were 94.0 males, and for every 100 females age 18 and over there were 90.5 males age 18 and over.

There were 7,751 households in the county, of which 29.4% had children under the age of 18 living with them and 26.7% had a female householder with no spouse or partner present. About 30.0% of all households were made up of individuals and 13.5% had someone living alone who was 65 years of age or older.

There were 8,921 housing units, of which 13.1% were vacant. Among occupied housing units, 68.3% were owner-occupied and 31.7% were renter-occupied. The homeowner vacancy rate was 2.8% and the rental vacancy rate was 12.8%.

43.3% of residents lived in urban areas, while 56.7% lived in rural areas.

The racial makeup of the county was 91.8% White, 0.6% Black or African American, 0.8% American Indian and Alaska Native, 0.5% Asian, 0.1% Native Hawaiian or Pacific Islander, 1.0% from some other race, and 5.2% from two or more races, with Hispanic or Latino residents of any race comprising 2.2% of the population.

Vernon County Racial Composition
Race	Num.	Perc.
White (NH)	17,966	91.2%
Black or African American (NH)	110	0.56%
Native American (NH)	131	0.66%
Asian (NH)	103	0.52%
Pacific Islander (NH)	18	0.1%
Other/Mixed (NH)	953	4.83%
Hispanic or Latino	426	2.16%

=== 2000 census ===
As of the 2000 census, there were 20,454 people, 7,966 households, and 5,432 families residing in the county. The population density was 24 people per square mile (9.3 people/km^{2}). There were 8,872 housing units at an average density of 11 units per square mile (4.2/km^{2}). The racial makeup of the county was 96.99% White, 0.61% Black or African American, 0.79% Native American, 0.31% Asian, 0.03% Pacific Islander, 0.31% from other races, and 0.95% from two or more races. Approximately 0.84% of the population were Hispanic or Latino of any race.

There were 7,966 households, out of which 32.20% had children under the age of 18 living with them, 55.30% were married couples living together, 9.60% had a female householder with no husband present, and 31.80% were non-families. 28.10% of all households were made up of individuals, and 13.00% had someone living alone who was 65 years of age or older. The average household size was 2.44, and the average family size was 2.97.

In the county, the population was spread out, with 26.60% under 18, 9.20% from 18 to 24, 25.40% from 25 to 44, 22.50% from 45 to 64, and 16.30% who were 65 years of age or older. The median age was 37 years. For every 100 females, there were 93.50 males. For every 100 females age 18 and over, there were 88.00 males.

The median income for a household in the county was $30,021, and the median income for a family was $37,714. Males had a median income of $28,182 versus $19,026 for females. The per capita income for the county was $15,047. About 10.10% of families and 14.90% of the population were below the poverty line, including 20.30% of those under age 18 and 13.30% of those age 65 or over.

== Education ==
=== Public schools ===
- Bronaugh R-VII School District – Bronaugh
  - Bronaugh Elementary School (PK-06)
  - Bronaugh High School (07-12)
- Nevada R-V School District – Nevada
  - Weber Elementary School (PK-02)
  - Truman Elementary School (03-05)
  - Nevada Middle School (06-08)
  - Nevada High School (09-12)
- Northeast Vernon County R-I School District – Walker
  - Northeast Vernon County Elementary School (PK-06)
  - Northeast Vernon County High School (07-12)
- Sheldon R-VIII School District – Sheldon
  - Sheldon Elementary School (PK-06)
  - Sheldon High School (07-12)

=== Private schools ===
- Nevada Seventh-day Adventist Christian School – Nevada (02-07) – Seventh-day Adventist
- St. Mary Elementary School – Nevada (Early Childhood) – Roman Catholic

=== Colleges and universities ===
- Cottey College – Nevada A private, four-year college for women.

=== Public libraries ===
- Nevada Public Library

== Communities ==
=== Townships ===
- Bacon Township
- Badger Township
- Blue Mound Township
- Center Township
- Clear Creek Township
- Coal Township
- Deerfield Township
- Dover Township
- Drywood Township
- Harrison Township
- Henry Township
- Lake Township
- Metz Township
- Montevallo Township
- Moundville Township
- Osage Township
- Richland Township
- Virgil Township
- Walker Township
- Washington Township

=== Cities ===
- Bronaugh
- Nevada (county seat)
- Schell City
- Sheldon

=== Villages ===
- Deerfield
- Harwood
- Metz
- Milo
- Moundville
- Richards
- Stotesbury

=== Unincorporated communities ===
- Amos
- Arthur
- Bellamy
- Blaine
- Bristow
- Carbon Center
- Dederick
- Ellis
- Eve
- Fair Haven
- Horton
- Katy
- Ketterman
- Montevallo
- Panama
- Portia
- Swart
- Rinehart
- Virgil City
- Walker
- Zodiac

=== Former settlements ===
- Fort Carondelet

== Politics ==
=== Local ===
The Republican Party predominantly controls politics at the local level in Vernon County despite the Democratic Party's historical control. Republicans hold all but three of the elected positions in the county.

Vernon County, Missouri

Elected countywide officials
Assessor	Lena Kleeman	Republican
Circuit Clerk	Carrie Poe	Republican
County Clerk	Adrienne Lee	Republican
Collector	Brent Banes	Republican
Commissioner (presiding)	Joe Wilson	Republican
Commissioner (district 1)	Cindy Thompson	Republican
Commissioner (district 2)	Everett Wolf	Republican
Coroner	David L. Ferry	Democratic
Prosecuting Attorney	Brandy McInroy	Republican
Public Administrator	Kelsey Westerhold	Republican
Recorder	Shelly Baldwin	Republican
Sheriff	Jason Mosher	Republican
Treasurer	Brent Banes	Republican

=== State ===
Past Gubernatorial Elections Results
Year	Republican	Democratic	Third Parties
2024	79.77% 7,050	18.14% 1,603	2.09% 185
2020	77.01% 7,022	20.72% 1,889	2.27% 207
2016	66.67% 5,699	30.66% 2,621	2.67% 228
2012	52.26% 4,424	44.40% 3,759	3.34% 283
2008	46.54% 4,095	51.05% 4,491	2.41% 212
2004	66.76% 5,989	31.97% 2,868	1.27% 114
2000	52.49% 4,370	45.20% 3,763	2.30% 192
1996	39.90% 3,039	57.27% 4,362	2.84% 216

All of Vernon County is a part of Missouri's 126th District in the Missouri House of Representatives and is represented by Patricia Pike (R-Adrian).

Missouri House of Representatives — District 126 — Vernon County (2016)
Party	Candidate	Votes	%	±%
Republican	Patricia Pike	7,836	100.00%	+46.45

Missouri House of Representatives — District 126 — Vernon County (2014)
Party	Candidate	Votes	%	±%
Republican	Patricia Pike	2,960	53.55%	−46.45
Democratic	Sam Foursha	2,398	43.38%	+43.38
Constitution	William M. Gilmore	170	3.07%	+3.07

Missouri House of Representatives — District 126 — Vernon County (2012)
Party	Candidate	Votes	%	±%
Republican	Randy Pike	7,309	100.00%	

All of Vernon County is a part of Missouri's 31st District in the Missouri Senate and is currently represented by Rick Brattin (R-Harrisonville).

Missouri Senate — District 31 — Vernon County (2016)
Party	Candidate	Votes	%	±%
Republican	Ed Emery	5,492	65.69%	−2.73
Independent	Tim Wells	2,320	27.75%	+27.75
Libertarian	Lora Young	548	6.56%	+6.56

Missouri Senate — District 31 — Vernon County (2012)
Party	Candidate	Votes	%	±%
Republican	Ed Emery	5,698	68.42%	
Democratic	Charlie A. Burton	2,630	31.58%	

=== Federal ===
U.S. Senate — Missouri — Vernon County (2016)
Party	Candidate	Votes	%	±%
Republican	Roy Blunt	5,448	63.71%	+14.48
Democratic	Jason Kander	2,700	31.58%	−13.38
Libertarian	Jonathan Dine	231	2.70%	−3.11
Green	Johnathan McFarland	91	1.06%	+1.06
Constitution	Fred Ryman	81	0.95%	+0.95

U.S. Senate — Missouri — Vernon County (2012)
Party	Candidate	Votes	%	±%
Republican	Todd Akin	4,171	49.23%	
Democratic	Claire McCaskill	3,810	44.96%	
Libertarian	Jonathan Dine	492	5.81%	

All of Vernon County is included in Missouri's 4th Congressional District and is currently represented by Vicky Hartzler (R-Harrisonville) in the U.S. House of Representatives.

U.S. House of Representatives — Missouri's 4th Congressional District — Vernon County (2016)
Party	Candidate	Votes	%	±%
Republican	Vicky Hartzler	6,526	77.00%	+4.66
Democratic	Gordon Christensen	1,676	19.78%	−3.76
Libertarian	Mark Bliss	273	3.22%	−0.90

U.S. House of Representatives — Missouri's 4th Congressional District — Vernon County (2014)
Party	Candidate	Votes	%	±%
Republican	Vicky Hartzler	3,970	72.34%	+5.41
Democratic	Nate Irvin	1,292	23.54%	−5.66
Libertarian	Herschel L. Young	226	4.12%	+1.01

U.S. House of Representatives — Missouri's 4th Congressional District — Vernon County (2012)
Party	Candidate	Votes	%	±%
Republican	Vicky Hartzler	5,597	66.93%	
Democratic	Teresa Hensley	2,442	29.20%	
Libertarian	Thomas Holbrook	260	3.11%	
Constitution	Greg Cowan	64	0.76%	

==== Political culture ====
Like many neighboring counties, Vernon County has become increasingly Republican over the past few presidential elections. The last time a Democratic candidate has carried this county was in 1996 by Bill Clinton.

United States presidential election results for Vernon County, Missouri
Year	Republican		Democratic		Third party(ies)	
Year	No.	%	No.	%	No.	%
1888	2,252	33.99%	4,057	61.23%	317	4.78%
1892	1,847	29.09%	3,627	57.13%	875	13.78%
1896	2,230	30.03%	5,133	69.12%	63	0.85%
1900	2,356	34.24%	4,306	62.58%	219	3.18%
1904	2,450	40.51%	3,225	53.32%	373	6.17%
1908	2,369	37.48%	3,705	58.61%	247	3.91%
1912	1,654	26.57%	3,483	55.94%	1,089	17.49%
1916	2,211	35.50%	3,776	60.63%	241	3.87%
1920	4,645	45.33%	5,419	52.89%	182	1.78%
1924	3,593	38.89%	4,839	52.38%	807	8.73%
1928	5,783	60.94%	3,676	38.74%	31	0.33%
1932	2,856	29.50%	6,687	69.07%	138	1.43%
1936	4,546	39.61%	6,872	59.87%	60	0.52%
1940	5,443	46.38%	6,271	53.44%	21	0.18%
1944	5,171	51.39%	4,885	48.55%	6	0.06%
1948	3,808	41.55%	5,342	58.29%	14	0.15%
1952	5,924	56.92%	4,450	42.76%	34	0.33%
1956	5,184	53.27%	4,547	46.73%	0	0.00%
1960	5,387	56.27%	4,186	43.73%	0	0.00%
1964	3,077	34.06%	5,958	65.94%	0	0.00%
1968	3,590	45.27%	3,557	44.85%	783	9.87%
1972	4,892	61.54%	3,057	38.46%	0	0.00%
1976	3,715	42.78%	4,921	56.67%	48	0.55%
1980	4,391	51.93%	3,704	43.80%	361	4.27%
1984	5,181	63.45%	2,984	36.55%	0	0.00%
1988	4,149	54.79%	3,402	44.93%	21	0.28%
1992	2,851	34.34%	3,546	42.71%	1,906	22.96%
1996	3,123	40.70%	3,363	43.82%	1,188	15.48%
2000	4,985	59.29%	3,156	37.54%	267	3.18%
2004	5,732	63.75%	3,206	35.65%	54	0.60%
2008	5,334	60.08%	3,381	38.08%	163	1.84%
2012	5,758	67.57%	2,580	30.28%	183	2.15%
2016	6,533	75.69%	1,707	19.78%	391	4.53%
2020	7,155	77.90%	1,903	20.72%	127	1.38%
2024	7,112	79.26%	1,774	19.77%	87	0.97%

=== Missouri presidential preference primary (2008) ===
Former U.S. Senator Hillary Clinton (D-New York) received more votes, a total of 1,434, than any candidate from either party in Vernon County during the 2008 presidential primary.

== See also ==
- National Register of Historic Places listings in Vernon County, Missouri
