= National Register of Historic Places listings in Miller County, Missouri =

Location of Miller County in Missouri

This is a list of the National Register of Historic Places listings in Miller County, Missouri.

This is intended to be a complete list of the properties and districts on the National Register of Historic Places in Miller County, Missouri, United States. Latitude and longitude coordinates are provided for many National Register properties and districts; these locations may be seen together in a map.

There are 8 properties and districts listed on the National Register in the county.

This National Park Service list is complete through NPS recent listings posted April 18, 2025.

== Current listings ==
	Name on the Register	Image	Date listed	Location	City or town	Description
1	Bagnell Dam and Osage Power Plant	Bagnell Dam and Osage Power Plant	August 27, 2008 (#08000822)	617 River Rd. 38°12′14″N 92°37′27″W	Lake Ozark	
2	Boeckman Bridge		March 19, 1979 (#79001382)	Southeast of St. Elizabeth over Big Tavern Creek; 38°13′35″N 92°14′23″W	St. Elizabeth	Replaced in 2003
3	Grand Auglaize Bridge		October 8, 2020 (#100005663)	Swinging Bridges Rd. across Grand Auglaize Cr. 38°04′38″N 92°31′36″W	Brumley vicinity	Closed to all traffic since January 6, 2021
4	Iberia Academy and Junior College		September 4, 1980 (#80002379)	Missouri Route 17 and Missouri Route 42; 38°05′25″N 92°17′48″W	Iberia	
5	Lake of the Ozarks State Park Highway 134 Historic District	Lake of the Ozarks State Park Highway 134 Historic District	February 26, 1985 (#85000533)	West of Brumley along Missouri Route 134; 38°06′37″N 92°34′00″W	Brumley	Extends into Camden County
6	Olean Railroad Depot		December 23, 1993 (#93001452)	Main St. east of junction with California St. 38°24′38″N 92°31′42″W	Olean	
7	P.A. Sanning Store		June 16, 2005 (#05000613)	256 Route H 38°18′22″N 92°21′29″W	Mary's Home	
8	Union Electric Administration Building-Lakeside		April 13, 1998 (#98000364)	1 Willmore Ln. 38°12′37″N 92°37′26″W	Lakeside	Boundary increase at the same address on June 23, 2011

== See also ==
- List of National Historic Landmarks in Missouri
- National Register of Historic Places listings in Missouri
