= Hurricane deck =

Hurricane deck or Hurricane Deck may refer to:

- An upper deck, on certain types of ships
- Hurricane Deck, Missouri, USA
  - Hurricane Deck Bridge, located nearby
- Hurricane Deck (California), a ridge in California's San Rafael Wilderness
