= Pawhuska Township, Camden County, Missouri =

Pawhuska Township
- Township
- Location in Camden County
- Coordinates: 38°11′05″N 92°42′58″W
- Country: United States
- State: Missouri
- County: Camden

Area
  - Total: 30.18 sq mi (78.17 km^{2})
  - Land: 19.48 sq mi (50.46 km^{2})
  - Water: 10.70 sq mi (27.72 km^{2}) 35.46%
- Elevation: 732 ft (223 m)

Population (2000)
  - Total: 5,617
  - Density: 288/sq mi (111.3/km^{2})
- Time zone: UTC-6 (CST)
  - Summer (DST): UTC-5 (CDT)
- ZIP codes: 65047, 65049, 65052, 65065, 65079
- GNIS feature ID: 2397852

Pawhuska Township is one of eleven townships in Camden County, Missouri, USA. As of the 2000 census, its population was 5,617.

== Geography ==
According to the United States Census Bureau, Pawhuska Township covers an area of 30.18 square miles (78.17 square kilometers); of this, 19.48 square miles (50.46 square kilometers, 64.55 percent) is land and 10.7 square miles (27.72 square kilometers, 35.46 percent) is water.

=== Cities, towns, villages ===
- Lake Ozark (partial)
- Osage Beach (partial)
- Village of Four Seasons

=== Unincorporated towns ===
- Four Seasons at 38.198087°N 92.711021°W
- Laguna Beach at 38.130311°N 92.651574°W

(This list is based on USGS data and may include former settlements.)

=== Adjacent townships ===
- Glaze Township, Miller County (east)
- Jackson Township (southeast)
- Kiheka Township (south)
- Osage Township (southwest)
- Jasper Township (west)
- Osage Township, Morgan County (northwest)

=== Cemeteries ===
The township contains these six cemeteries: Arnold, Conway, Downing, Houston, Riverview and Stevens.

=== Major highways ===
- U.S. Route 54
- Missouri Route 42

=== Airports and landing strips ===
- Eagles Roost Heliport
- Links Landing Seaplane Base
- Linn Creek-Grand Glaize Memorial Airport

=== Landmarks ===
- Lake of the Ozarks State Park (west edge)

== School districts ==
- Camdenton R-III School District
- School Of The Osage R-II

== Political districts ==
- Missouri's 4th congressional district
- Missouri's 4th congressional district
- State House District 115
- State House District 155
- State Senate District 33
- State Senate District 6
