= Party Cove =

Cove of Lake of the Ozarks

Anderson Hollow Cove
- "Party Cove"
- Location: Camden County, Missouri
- Coordinates: 38.102076°N 92.655816°W
- Type: Cove
- Part of: Lake of the Ozarks

Location
- Interactive map of Anderson Hollow Cove

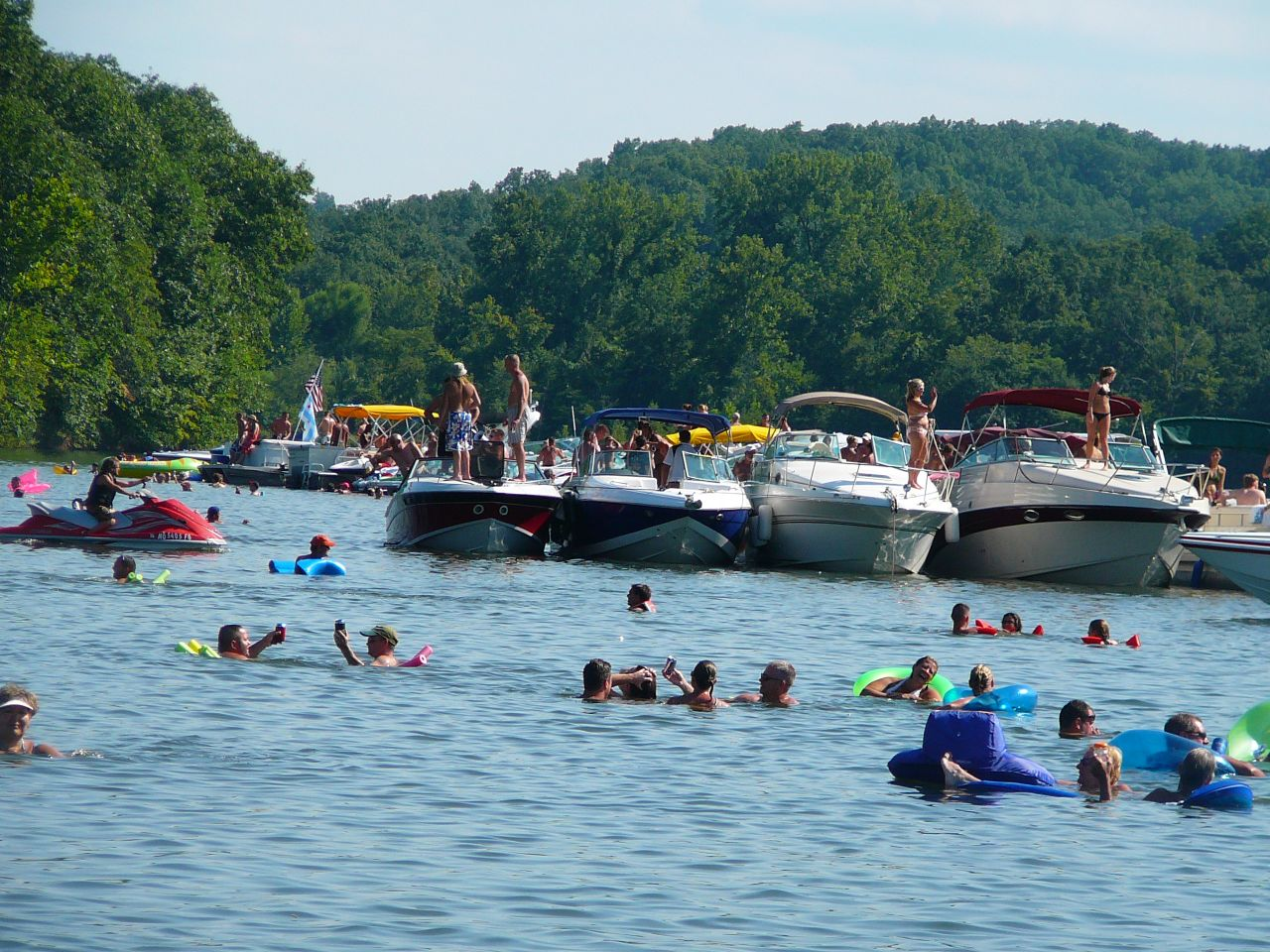
Party Cove photo by James Carr in 2007 depicting the boats lashed together.

Party Cove is the popular name given for Anderson Hollow Cove, a cove in Lake of the Ozarks in Missouri that according to The New York Times is the "oldest established permanent floating bacchanal in the country."

The cove itself is about a mile (1.6 km) long and 200 yards (183 m) wide. On summer weekends as many as 3,000 pleasure boats with around 8,000 aboard gather in the cove lining up in two rows with newcomers running a gauntlet of water cannon and taunts to take their clothes off (although The Kansas City Star reports that the overwhelming number of visitors in the fraternity house environment are male).

Missouri has 18 officers assigned to the entire Lake of the Ozarks. They had historically limited the policing of the cove to violations of wake restrictions, and boat driving violations and Boating While Intoxicated summonses. Attempts to stop the practice of rafting up, whereby boats are roped together, failed to pass the Missouri General Assembly.

Missouri says that the area around the cove is the most dangerous in the entire lake. After two people died in 2007, Missouri announced plans to have officers from other districts crack down on nudity (women can be topless but not bottomless), public sex acts, and drug use.

== History ==
Various locations around the lake have received the name since the 1960s, but the informal event was pushed out by private owners until 1996 when it moved to Anderson Hollow Cove, within the confines of Lake of the Ozarks State Park at the 4 mile marker of the Grand Glaize Arm of the lake, a mile south of the Grand Glaize Bridge.

In 2007, Major General Bill McCoy, commander of the Fort Leonard Wood Army base, declared Party Cove "off-limits" to Army personnel from the base for safety and health issues after a Fort Leonard Wood soldier suffered a broken neck and a soldier and a civilian employee drowned in separate incidents in the cove area that summer. The April 30, 2010, list of "off-limits" establishments, however, no longer lists Party Cove as being off-limits to military personnel.

== In popular culture ==
The cove has been featured on Playboy TV, A Current Affair, Sexcetera, and is mentioned in season 1, episodes 5 and 6 and season 3, episode 2 of Ozark.
