= Hurricane Deck, Missouri =

Unincorporated community in Missouri, U.S.

Hurricane Deck
- Unincorporated community
- Location of Hurricane Deck in Missouri
- Coordinates: 38°07′54″N 92°47′38″W
- Country: United States
- State: Missouri
- County: Camden

Hurricane Deck is an unincorporated community in Camden County, Missouri, United States, on the Lake of the Ozarks. It is part of the lake's resort area, and according to one source is named for a tornado which struck the area, tornadoes once being called "hurricanes" locally.

According to lakehistory.info, Hurricane Deck derives its name from the nautical name for the top deck of a river steamship, which is called a "Hurricane Deck" because the wind always blew up there. There is a high ridge at the location on the lake.

One of the most distinctive bridges in the Lake of the Ozarks was the Hurricane Deck Bridge, which carried Route 5 across the Osage Arm of the lake. The bridge, which was completed in 1936, was one of three "upside-down" bridges where its truss support is below the road deck, enabling passengers in cars to see the lake. The bridge's design is similar to the I-35W Mississippi River bridge that collapsed in Minneapolis, Minnesota in 2007 (although the Hurricane Deck Bridge's main span was actually longer—462 feet vs. 458 feet—and the Hurricane Deck had piers in the water while the Minnesota bridge spanned both sides of the Mississippi). The other two bridges—the Grand Glaize Bridge over the Grand Glaize Arm and the Niangua Bridge over the Niangua Arm have since been torn down and replaced by girder bridges.
