= Grand Auglaize Bridge =

- U.S. National Register of Historic Places
- Location within Missouri Location within the United States
- Location: Grand Auglaize Creek near Brumley, Missouri on Swinging Bridge Road
- Coordinates: 38.077104°N 92.526742°W
- Built: 1931
- Built by: Dice, Joseph
- NRHP reference No.: 100005663
- Added to NRHP: October 8, 2020

Grand Auglaize Bridge also known as the Brumley Swinging Bridge is a swinging bridge over the Grand Auglaize Creek near Brumley, Missouri. It was built in 1931 by engineer Joseph Dice. It was added to the National Register of Historic Places on October 8, 2020.

== History ==
The bridge was built in 1931. In a 2018 inspection of the bridge, it was rated as "poor." A campaign to save the bridge was launched. It was added to the List of National Register of Historic places on October 8, 2020. Since January 6, 2021, the bridge has been closed to all traffic due to structural issues. In 2024, it was announced that the bridge will be repaired and will reopen to traffic in 2026 with an opening ceremony.

== See also ==
National Register of Historic Places listings in Miller County, Missouri
