= Village of Four Seasons =

Village of Four Seasons may refer to:

- Village of Four Seasons, Missouri
- Village of Four Seasons, Pennsylvania
