= Bagnell, Missouri =

- Town
- Location in Miller County and the state of Missouri
- Coordinates: 38°13′46″N 92°36′19″W
- Country: United States
- State: Missouri
- County: Miller
- Incorporated: 1926

Area
  - Total: 0.60 sq mi (1.55 km^{2})
  - Land: 0.47 sq mi (1.22 km^{2})
  - Water: 0.13 sq mi (0.33 km^{2})
- Elevation: 581 ft (177 m)

Population (2020)
  - Total: 43
  - Density: 91.5/sq mi (35.34/km^{2})
- Time zone: UTC-6 (Central (CST))
  - Summer (DST): UTC-5 (CDT)
- ZIP code: 65026 (Eldon)
- Area code: 573
- FIPS code: 29-02962
- GNIS feature ID: 2396583

Bagnell (/ˈbæɡnɛl/ BAG-nel) is a town in Miller County, Missouri, United States. The population was 43 at the 2020 census, down from 93 in 2010.

== History ==
Bagnell was platted in 1882, when the railroad was extended through the area. The town was named after William Bagnell of St. Louis County, who operated a tie business along the Osage River. A post office called Bagnell was established in 1884, and remained in operation until 1942.

== Geography ==
Bagnell is in western Miller County, on the north side of Little Gravois Creek where it enters the Osage River, which forms the eastern border of the town. It is bordered to the southwest by the city of Lake Ozark. Bagnell is accessible by County Highway V, which leads 1 mile (2 km) southeast from U.S. Route 54 to the center of town. The city of Eldon is 9 miles (14 km) to the north, while Osage Beach is 6 miles (10 km) to the south. Bagnell Dam, which forms the Lake of the Ozarks on the Osage River, is 2 miles (3 km) southwest of Bagnell.

According to the U.S. Census Bureau, Bagnell has a total area of 0.60 square miles (1.55 km^{2}), of which 0.47 square miles (1.22 km^{2}) are land and 0.13 square miles (0.34 km^{2}), or 21.5%, are water.

== Demographics ==
Historical population
Census	Pop.	Note	%±
1930	449		—
1940	118		−73.7%
1950	74		−37.3%
1960	62		−16.2%
1970	60		−3.2%
1980	71		18.3%
1990	89		25.4%
2000	86		−3.4%
2010	93		8.1%
2020	43		−53.8%
U.S. Decennial Census

=== 2010 census ===
At the 2010 census there were 93 people in 43 households, including 24 families, in the town. The population density was 197.9 inhabitants per square mile (76.4/km^{2}). There were 60 housing units at an average density of 127.7 per square mile (49.3/km^{2}). The racial makeup of the town was 94.6% White and 5.4% from two or more races.

Of the 43 households, 32.6% had children under the age of 18 living with them, 34.9% were married couples living together, 16.3% had a female householder with no husband present, 4.7% had a male householder with no wife present, and 44.2% were non-families. 32.6% of households were one person, and 4.6% were one person aged 65 or older. The average household size was 2.16 and the average family size was 2.71.

The median age was 42.3 years. 23.7% of residents were under the age of 18; 8.6% were between the ages of 18 and 24; 27% were from 25 to 44; 34.4% were from 45 to 64; and 6.5% were 65 or older. The gender makeup of the town was 49.5% male and 50.5% female.

=== 2000 census ===
At the 2000 census there were 86 people, 36 households, and 20 families in the town. The population density was 183.3 inhabitants per square mile (70.8/km^{2}). There were 37 housing units at an average density of 78.9 per square mile (30.5/km^{2}). The racial makeup of the town was 96.51% White and 3.49% Native American. Hispanic or Latino of any race were 1.16%.

Of the 36 households, 30.6% had children under the age of 18 living with them, 38.9% were married couples living together, 11.1% had a female householder with no husband present, and 41.7% were non-families. 38.9% of households were one person, and 22.2% were one person aged 65 or older. The average household size was 2.39 and the average family size was 3.00.

In the town the population was spread out, with 27.9% under the age of 18, 9.3% from 18 to 24, 29.1% from 25 to 44, 20.9% from 45 to 64, and 12.8% 65 or older. The median age was 36 years. For every 100 females there were 95.5 males. For every 100 females age 18 and over, there were 100.0 males.

The median household income was $25,313 and the median family income was $27,857. Males had a median income of $22,083 versus $16,563 for females. The per capita income for the town was $14,633. There were no families and 2.2% of the population living below the poverty line, including no under eighteens and 11.1% of those over 64.
