= Grand Glaize Bridge =

Road bridge in Missouri, United States

Police Officer Phylicia Carson Memorial Bridge
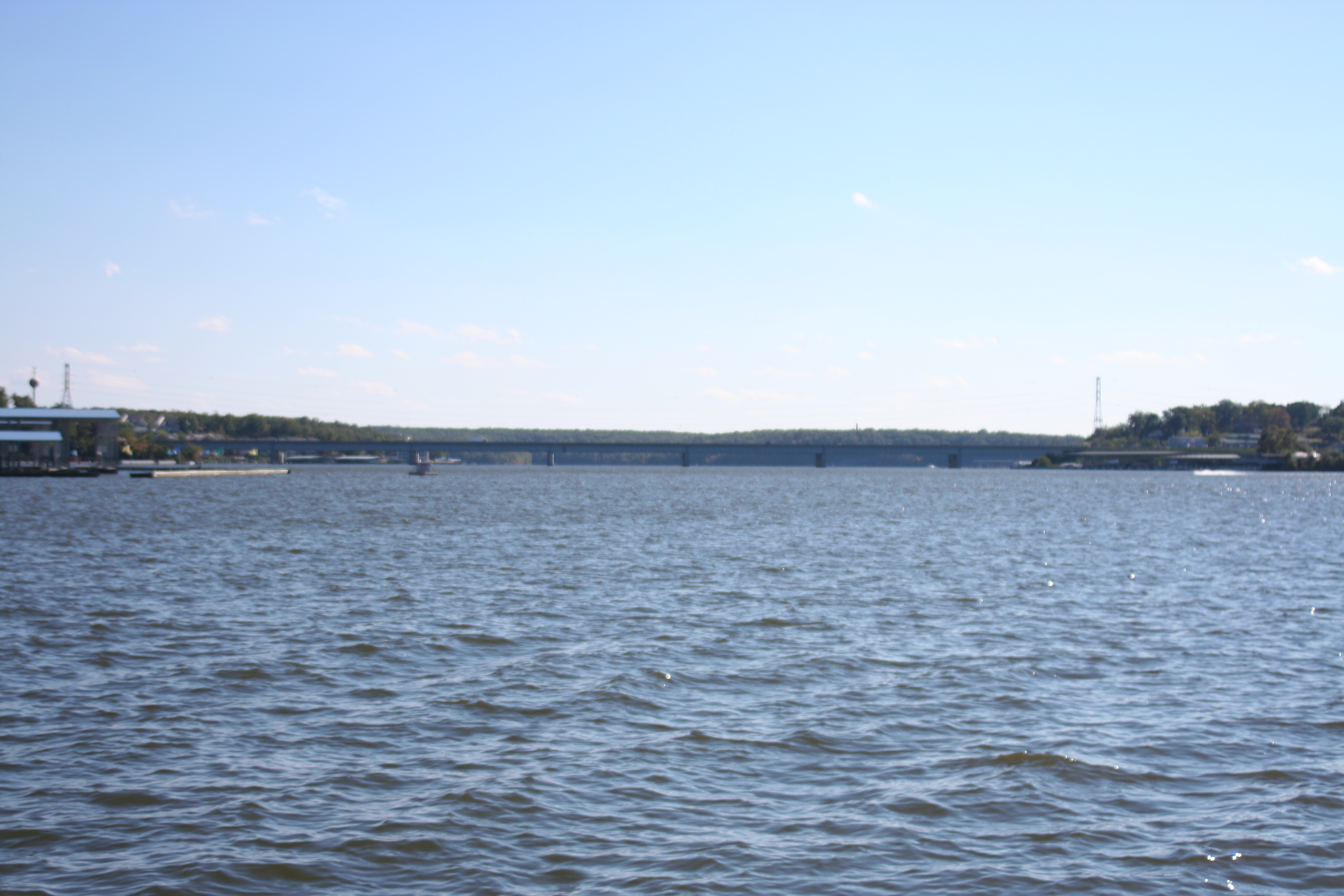
- Coordinates: 38°08′01″N 92°38′37″W
- Carries: US 54
- Crosses: Grand Glaize Arm; Lake of the Ozarks
- Locale: Camden County, Missouri

Characteristics
- Design: Deck truss bridge

History
- Construction start: March 1930
- Opened: January 1931(original) 1995 (Replacement girder bridges)

Location
- Interactive map of Police Officer Phylicia Carson Memorial Bridge

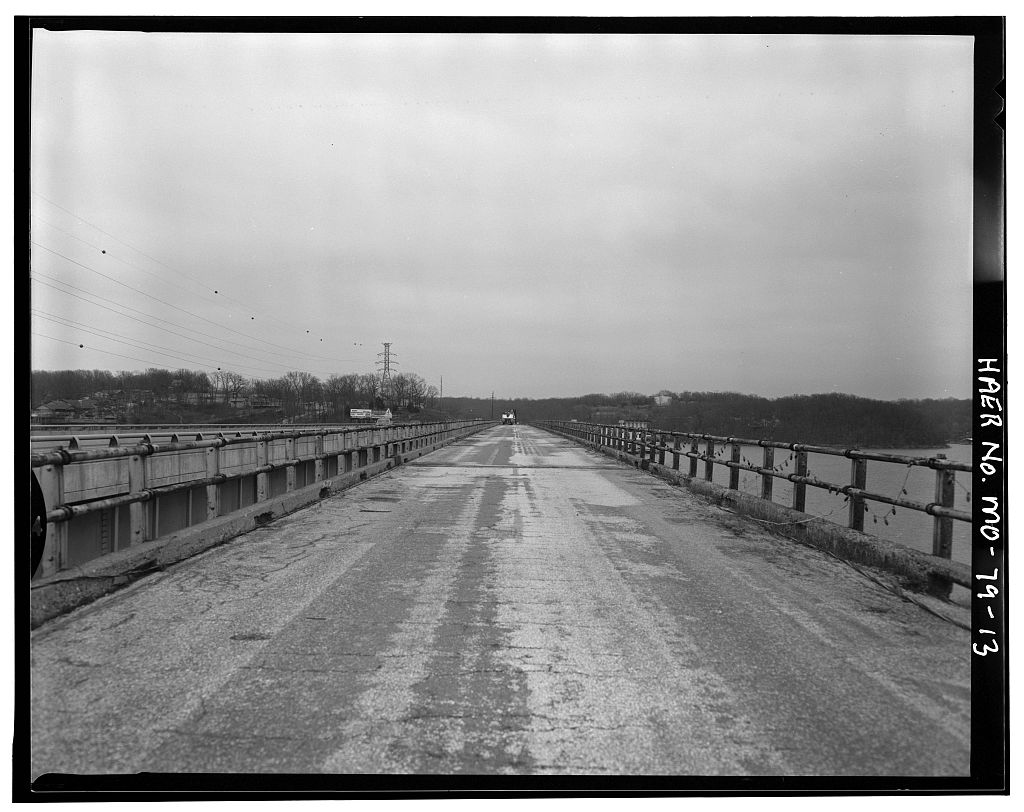
The Grand Glaize Bridge, sometime before 1968

The Police Officer Phylicia Carson Memorial Bridge, formerly known as the Grand Glaize Bridge, is the name of two girder bridges that carry U.S. Route 54 over the Grand Glaize Arm of the Lake of the Ozarks in the city of Osage Beach, Missouri.

The bridge crosses Grand Glaize Creek that is a tributary to the Osage River in Camden County, Missouri.

== History ==
The original two-lane Grand Glaize Bridge was built in 1931 during the construction of Bagnell Dam and the Lake of the Ozarks. It was a Warren truss or deck truss structure with the trusses built under the deck. Other bridges built across the lake at the time including the Hurricane Deck Bridge over the Osage Arm and the Niangua Bridge over the Niangua Arm were also deck truss structures. The only non-deck-truss bridge on the lake was the Niangua Arm US 54 Bridge. The original bridge had very narrow lanes and no shoulder.

The new parallel girder bridge carrying westbound traffic was completed in 1984. The original bridge was torn down and the new eastbound girder bridge was built in 1995 in the place of the original.

In 2023, both the eastbound bridge and westbound underwent rehabilitation by placing epoxy-wearing on the surface. Only one side was done at a time.

There has been proposals to add a pedestrian bridge adjacent to the existing bridge due to no current dedicated pedestrian walkway present.

In August 2025, the bridge was renamed "Police Officer Phylicia Carson Memorial Bridge" in honor of an Osage Beach police officer who died during a high speed chase in August 2024. Senate Bill 348 was signed in June 2025.

== See also ==
- List of bridges documented by the Historic American Engineering Record in Missouri
