= Lakefront Empire =

Television series

- No. of seasons: 1
- No. of episodes: 3

Production
- Production location: Lake of the Ozarks

Original release
- Network: HGTV
- Release: March 11 – May 7, 2024

Lakefront Empire is an American television series that premiered on March 11, 2024, on HGTV. The series explores various lakeside homes at the shores of the Lake of the Ozarks.

== Premise ==
The series explores various lakefront homes on the shores of the Lake of the Ozarks. It is hosted by Amanda Smith, Gerardo Cornejo, Peggy Albers, Cierra Grein, and brothers Jonas and Justin Farrell.

== Production ==
In February 2024, HGTV announced that a TV series that would consist of 8 episode for season 1 would premiere March 11, 2024 with Amanda Smith, Gerardo Cornejo, Peggy Albers, Cierra Grein, and brothers Jonas and Justin Farrell being the hosts. Season 1 concluded May 7, 2024. The series was not renewed for a second season.

== Episodes ==
Season	Episodes	Originally released	
Season	Episodes	First released	Last released
1	TBA	March 11, 2024	May 7, 2024

=== Season 1 ===
No. overall	No. in season	Title	Original release date	U.S. viewers (millions)
1	1	"The Midwest Coast"	March 11, 2024	N/A
2	2	"Lakeview or Bust"	March 18, 2024	N/A
3	3	"Talking Turnkey"	March 25, 2024	N/A
4	4	"Risqué Resort"	April 1, 2024	N/A
5	5	"Sink or Swim"	April 8, 2024	N/A
6	6	"Clash of Legends"	April 22, 2024	N/A
7	7	"Cheer Challenge"	April 30, 2024	N/A
8	8	"Main Channel Mansions"	May 7, 2024	N/A
