= Union Electric Administration Building-Lakeside =

- U.S. National Register of Historic Places
- Location within Missouri Location within the United States
- Location: 1 Willmore Ln., near Lakeside, Missouri
- Coordinates: 38°12′37″N 92°37′26″W
- Area: 6.06 acres (2.45 ha)
- Built by: Stone & Webster
- Architect: LaBaume & Klien
- Architectural style: Adorondack Rustic Lodge
- NRHP reference No.: 98000364, 11000400 (Boundary Increase)
- Added to NRHP: April 13, 1998, June 23, 2011 (Boundary Increase)

Union Electric Administration Building-Lakeside, also known as Willmore Lodge and Egan Lodge, is a historic administration building and retreat overlooking Lake of the Ozarks and located near Lakeside, Miller County, Missouri. It was built in 1930 by Union Electric Company during the Bagnell Dam project. It is a one- to two-story, V-shaped Adirondack rustic style log building. It has a stone veneer foundation and an intersecting gable, cedar shake roof.

It was added to the National Register of Historic Places in 1998, with a boundary increase in 2011.
