= Central Illinois Public Service Company =

The Central Illinois Public Service Company was an electric streetcar holding company and power utility first organized in 1902. Under its later quarter billion dollar holding company, CIPSCO Inc. (formerly NYSE: CIP), it merged in 1997 with the larger neighboring Union Electric Company of Missouri (formerly NYSE: UEP) to form Ameren Corporation (NYSE: AEE) based in St. Louis, Missouri. Now a subsidiary, Ameren Illinois is headquartered in Springfield, Illinois.

== History ==
In 1902, in Mattoon, Illinois, the core of the company was born as the Mattoon City Railway Streetcar company, the first of the company's many later interurban electric railways.

In 1910, the Mattoon City Railway was reorganized as the Central Illinois Public Service Company.

In 1912, the CIPS Company became a subsidiary of Samuel Insull's Middle West Utilities Company. The utilities company then acquired 60 utility properties. In 1913, it built the 6,000-kilowatt Kincaid, Illinois, Power Station, the first large-generating power station.

In 1921, the CIPS Company headquarters moved from Mattoon to downtown Springfield, Illinois, where it acquired the Farmers Bank Building and Annex, and renamed it the Public Service Building.

In 1922, the CIPS Company gas and electric plants in Beardstown, Illinois, were flooded by the Illinois River and tributaries.

In 1923, CIPS merged with the Middle West Power Company, and acquired the Grand Tower, Illinois, Power Station in southwestern Illinois on the Mississippi River. The merger brought the company's holdings to seven generating stations, 15 ice plants, and two interurban railways.

In 1931, the CIPS Company tore down its general office building headquarters in downtown Springfield, and on the same site built a new 15-story skyscraper, as the new Public Service Building. It was later renamed the Illinois Building.

In 1932, the Middle West Utilities Company was reorganized as the Middle West Corporation, and CIPS Company was no longer under control of Samuel Insull. Middle West Corporation retained control of CIPS Company.

In 1933, CIPS Company ended electric railway operations with the abandonment of the Chicago and Joliet Electric Railway and the Southern Illinois Railway and Power Company.

In 1940, construction began on the second 25,000-kilowatt unit at the Hutsonville Power Station.

In 1948, CIPS Company gained independence from the Middle West Corp., and began to trade on the New York Stock Exchange under the symbol CIP, paying a dividend to stockholders. At that time, CIPS also sold its three remaining ice plants, because the new inexpensive electric refrigerators put an end to the "ice box" and the CIPS ice trucks which had been commonplace throughout central and southern Illinois.

In November 1949, a winter ice storm hit central Illinois, bringing down both CIPS primary and high-voltage transmission lines.

In 1952, the CIPS Company's Meredosia, Illinois, Power Station became a key contributor to the new Midwest Power Pool system, in conjunction with power provided by CIPS's future Ameren mate, the neighboring Union Electric Company, and also with another later Ameren subsidiary, Illinois Power Company.

By the early 1990s, Central Illinois Public Service Company, an electric and natural gas utility, was reorganized as a subsidiary under its new holding company, CIPSCO Inc., which in turn continued to publicly trade on the stock exchange under the utility's old ticker symbol, CIP.

In 1993, CIPSCO battled a 500-year flood in metropolitan St. Louis from the swollen Missouri and Mississippi Rivers.

In 1995, shareholders of both CIPSCO Inc. and another utility twice its size, the S&P 500-listed Union Electric Company, approved the merger of the two companies. The merger was completed on December 31, 1997, when they became Ameren Corporation. At the time of the merger, CIPSCO had assets of about US$210 million, but still carried nearly half of US$1 billion in long-term debt, which it had accumulated by the 1980s.

CIPSCO became one of Ameren's operating companies, doing business as AmerenCIPS. Ameren is now a holding company for several other power companies and energy companies as well. The CIPSCO name disappeared in 2010, when Ameren merged AmerenCIPS and its two other Illinois operating companies—Illinois Power (AmerenIP) and Central Illinois Light Company (AmerenCILCO) to form Ameren Illinois.

== Criticisms ==
2007 marked the end of a freeze on energy prices in Illinois. AmerenCIPS, along with subsidiaries AmerenIP and AmerenCILCO, have been criticized for not making proper preparations for the hikes in energy prices which were passed on to customers. According to Ameren, customers could expect to see their electricity bills increase by 22% to 55%. However, the media report that some bills are increasing much more, up to 300%.
