= Union Electric Company =

Former American electric power utility

The Union Electric Company of Missouri (formerly NYSE: UEP) was an electric power utility that was organized in 1902 and grew to be one of the large U.S. companies listed among the S&P 500. In 1997, its holding company merged with a smaller neighboring utility, Central Illinois Public Service Company through its holding company, CIPSCO Inc. (formerly NYSE: CIP), to form Ameren Corporation (NYSE: AEE) based in St. Louis, Missouri.

== History ==
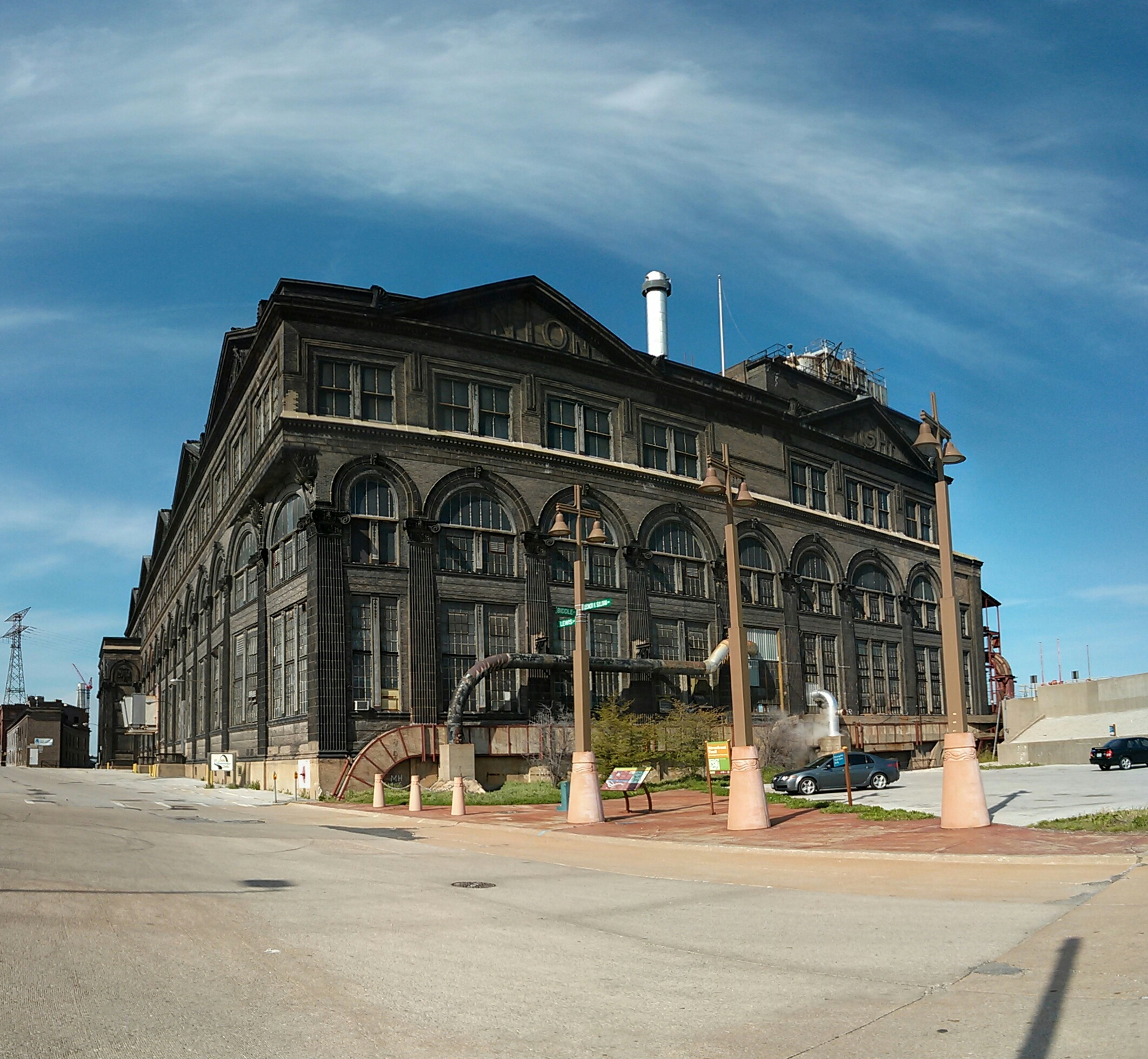
Ashley Street Light and Power building

The company's first incarnation, the Union Company, was organized in 1902 in St. Louis. Two years later, the renamed Union Electric Company built the 36 MW coal-fired Ashley Street Plant in the city's Near North Riverfront region to provide steam heat to downtown St. Louis. The plant was for years the city's main source of electricity. It powered The Palace of Electricity's electric lights at the 1904 World's Fair in St. Louis. The plant was converted to oil in 1972 and from oil to natural gas in 1996. Today, the plant functions as a district steam plant for the city of St. Louis and is owned by Ashley Energy.

By 1906, Union Electric Company was a publicly traded stock and began to pay a cash dividend to shareholders, which it paid every year until the 1997 merger.

In 1909, Union Electric began selling electric cars, and became the St. Louis agent for Studebaker and Rauch & Lang automobiles.

In 1919, the Shubert-Jefferson Theatre in the Union Electric building hosted a post-war national caucus in which the American Legion was born.

In 1927, a tornado struck St. Louis, destroying more than US$10 million worth of property, including Union Electric's electricity lines to the city.

By 1929, Union Electric Company became a subsidiary holding company of North American Company, one of the original stocks in the Dow Jones Industrial Average. Union Electric subsidiaries at the time included Union Electric Light and Power (Missouri) and Union Electric Light and Power of Illinois.

In 1929, UE completed Bagnell Dam on the Osage River, creating the Lake of the Ozarks with 1,400 miles of shoreline and a power station that generated almost 175 megawatts of hydroelectricity. The associated Union Electric Administration Building-Lakeside was constructed in 1930; it was added to the National Register of Historic Places in 1998, with a boundary increase in 2011.

In 1937 the company acquired the shares of the Union Colliery Company,

By 1940, Union Electric Company was one of three holding companies and also one of the ten major direct subsidiaries in the US$2.3 billion North American Company pyramid of 80 companies. At that time, North American owned more than 79% of Union Electric stock.

North American Company was broken up by the Securities and Exchange Commission after the United States Supreme Court decision of April 1, 1946. Union Electric Company was then divested from North American. Until the 1997 merger, Union Electric Company traded publicly as an independent company on the New York Stock Exchange under the ticker symbol UEP.

By the 1950s, Union Electric owned gas operations in and around Alton, Illinois, and acquired other utilities to become the third largest distributor of natural gas in Missouri.

In 1952, Union Electric joined with its future Ameren mate, the Central Illinois Public Service Company; and also with another later Ameren subsidiary, the Illinois Power Company, to form the Midwest Power Pool system.

In 1963 Union Electric completed construction of one of the largest pumped storage plants at that time, the then-350-megawatt Taum Sauk Plant, in Reynolds County, Missouri. In December 2005, a large section of the dam containing the plant's upper reservoir failed, draining over a billion gallons of water in less than half an hour.

In 1984, Union Electric's first nuclear energy plant, the Callaway Nuclear Generating Station, began providing 1,143 megawatts of power from Callaway County, Missouri.

In 1993, Union Electric battled a 500-year flood in the St. Louis metropolitan area from the swollen Missouri and Mississippi Rivers. In 1994, Union Electric shared the industry's Edison Award with Midwest Power Systems, Inc., of Des Moines, Iowa, for their work providing electric service to customers during the 1993 flood disaster.

In 1995, shareholders of both Union Electric Company and CIPSCO Inc. approved the companies' merger. The merger was completed on December 31, 1997, forming Ameren Corporation. At the time of the merger, Union Electric had assets of nearly US$600 million, but still carried nearly US$1.8 billion in long-term debt, down from US$2.5 billion which it had accumulated by the 1980s.

The former Union Electric Company is now a subsidiary of the Ameren Corporation holding company, initially d/b/a AmerenUE, later becoming Ameren Missouri in 2010. Ameren is now also a holding company for several other power companies and energy companies as well.

Ameren Missouri continues to own Bagnell Dam. Ameren Missouri is responsible for managing water levels on the Lake of the Ozarks according to federal regulations; if levels are not appropriate, the lake must be closed until Ameren can solve the problem.

Today, with nine power plants, Ameren Missouri serves 1.2 million power customers and 110,000 gas customers, primarily in Missouri, where more than half of its customers reside in the St. Louis metropolitan area. It formerly served Iowa as well through the mid-1990s. The former AmerenUE also served adjoining parts of Illinois; that portion would be transferred to Ameren Illinois in 2010.
