= Truss arch bridge =

Bridge type

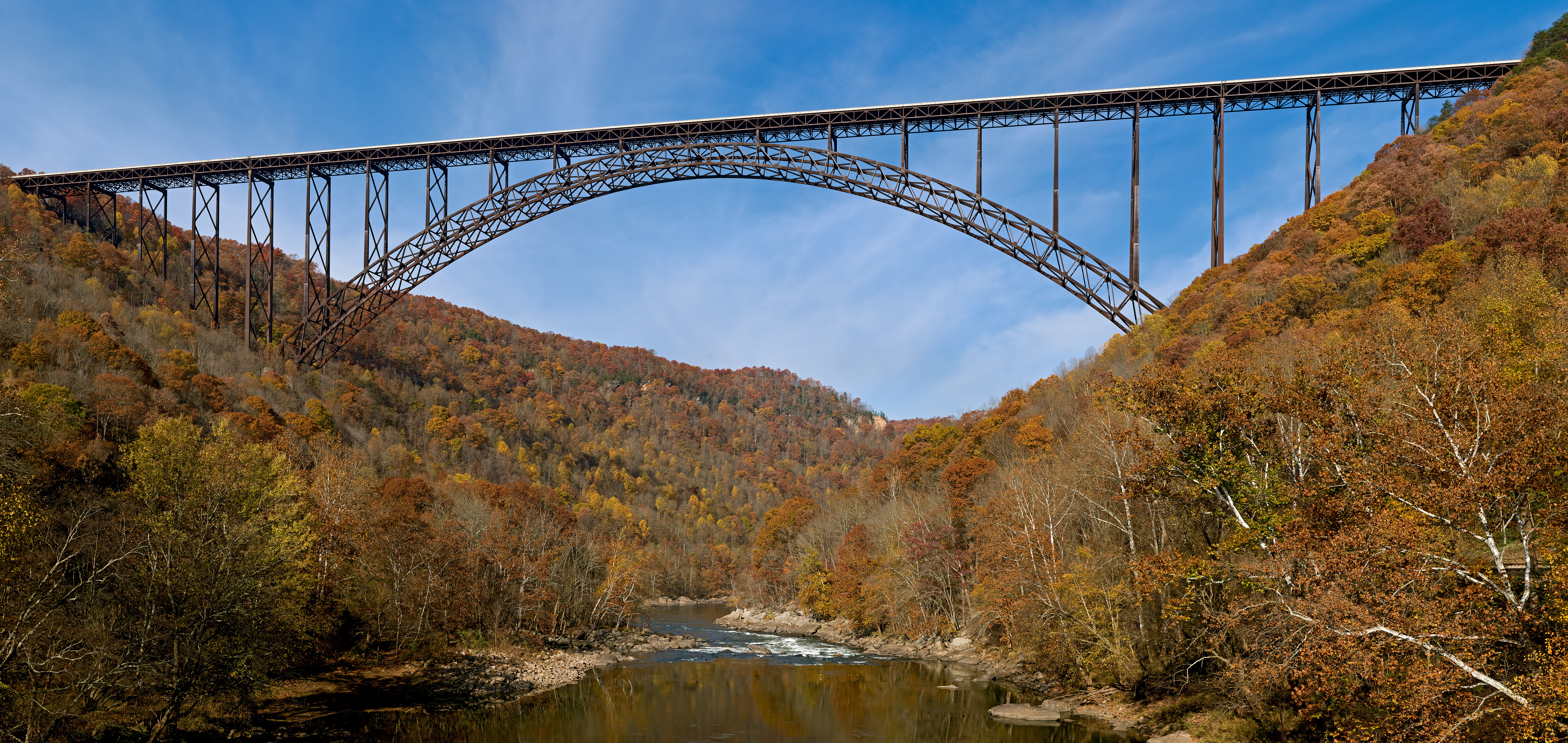
- New River Gorge Bridge, in Fayetteville, West Virginia
- Span range: Medium
- Material: structural steel
- Movable: No
- Design effort: Medium
- Falsework required: Sometimes, but long spans are often built using temporary cantilevers

A truss arch bridge combines the elements of the truss bridge and the arch bridge. The actual resolution of forces will depend upon the bridge' design. If no horizontal thrusting forces are generated, this becomes an arch-shaped truss which is essentially a bent beam – see moon bridge for an example. If horizontal thrust is generated but the apex of the arch is a pin joint, this is termed as a three-hinged arch. If no hinge exists at the apex, it will normally be a two-hinged arch.

In The Iron Bridge shown below, the structure of each frame emulates the kind of structure that previously had been made of wood. Such a wood structure uses closely fitted beams pinned together, so the members within the frames are not free to move relative to one another, as they are in a pin-jointed truss structure that allows rotation at the pin joint. Such rigid structures (which impose bending stresses upon the elements) were further developed in the 20th century as the Vierendeel truss.

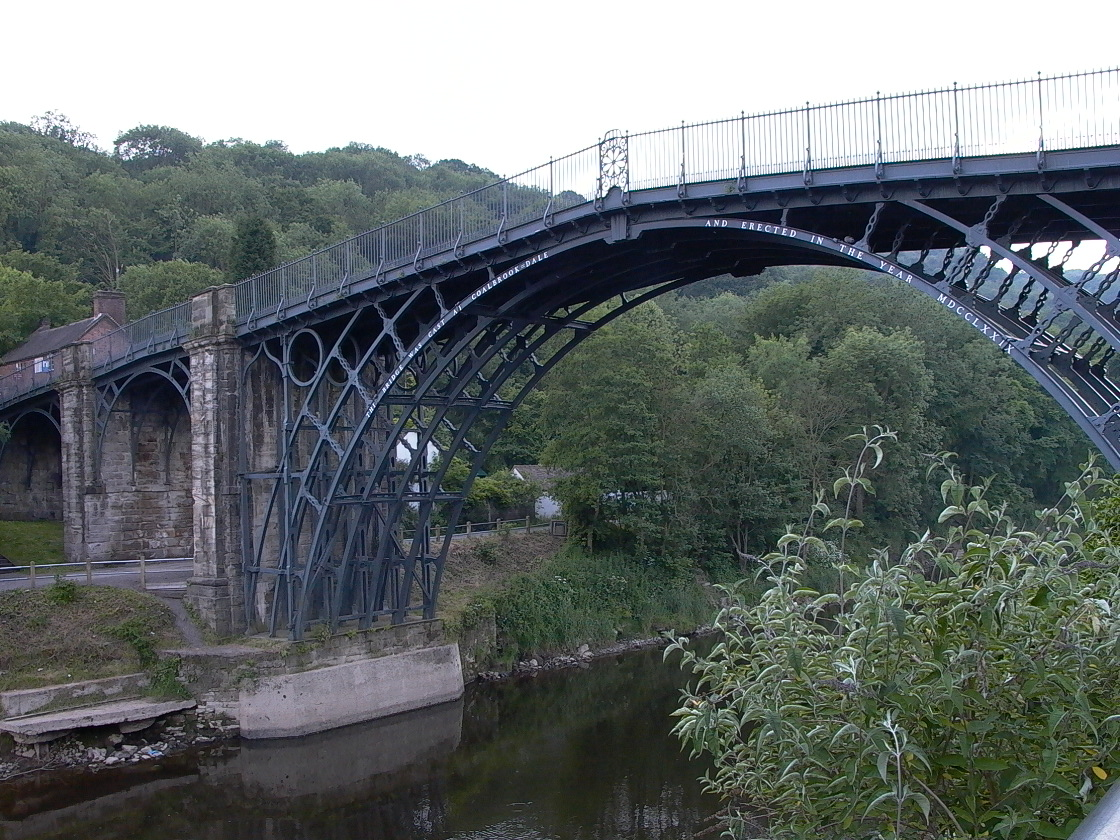
The Iron Bridge, a two-hinged arch, the first cast-iron bridge and the oldest still standing on its original site

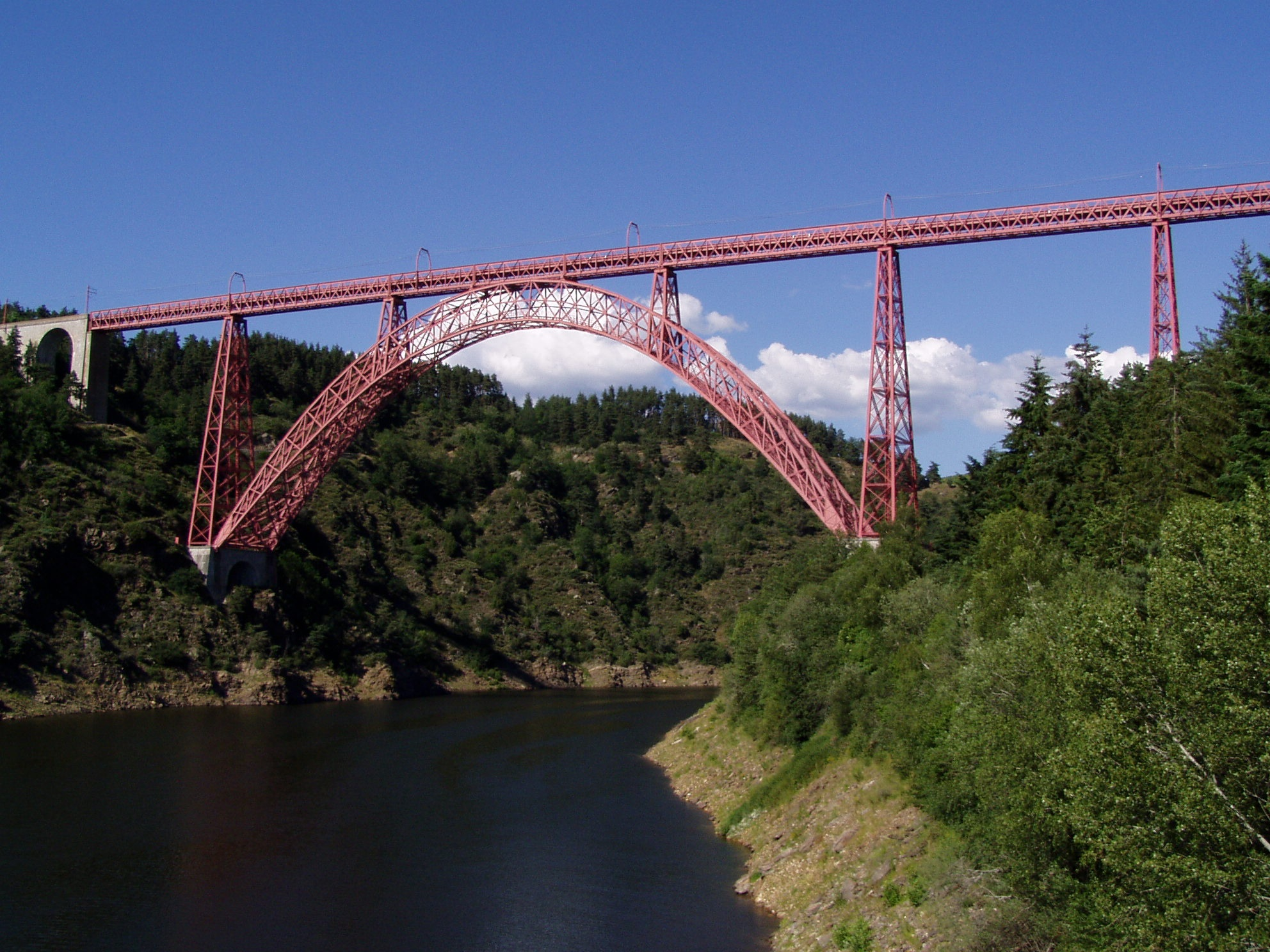
Garabit Viaduct, a thrust arch type employing a catenary shape

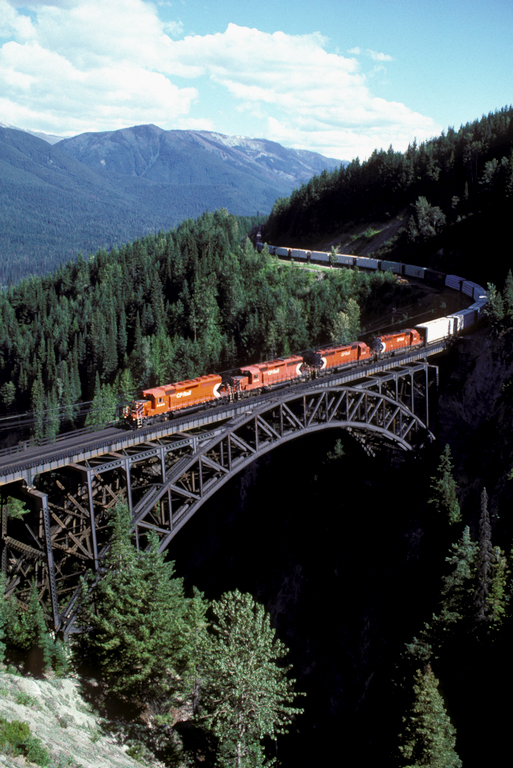
The steel Stoney Creek Bridge carries the Canadian Pacific Railway

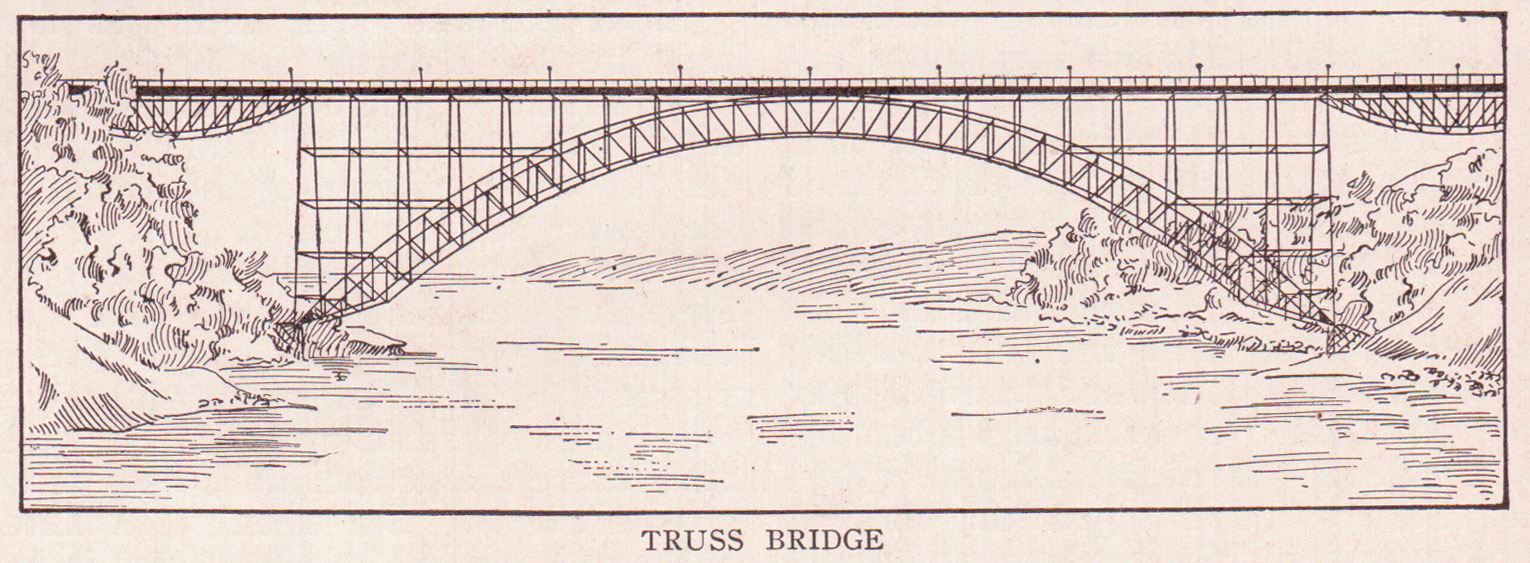
Illustration of a Truss arch bridge, showing the Honeymoon Bridge over the Niagara River (1917)

== Some bridges of this type ==
- Maria Pia Bridge (1877), Gustave Eiffel's pioneering two-hinge arch.
- Hurricane Deck Bridge (1936), the last remaining truss-type bridge on Lake of the Ozarks in central Missouri.
- I-35W Mississippi River bridge (1967) bridge that collapsed in 2007 in Minneapolis, Minnesota, USA.
- Navajo Bridge and newer (1995) bridge of the same general construction, each built as unsupported cantilevers joined with a central pin.The location is over the Colorado river in the grand canyon national park, in northern Coconino county, Arizona.
