= Grandglaize Creek =

River in the United States of America

- Location: Camden County, Missouri
- Type: Creek
- Primary inflows: Dry Auglaize Creek, Wet Glaize Creek
- Primary outflows: Lake of the Ozarks

Grandglaize Creek is a creek and tributary to the Osage River that forms the Grand Glaize Arm of the Lake of the Ozarks in Missouri. The creek flows for 10 miles (16 km) before reaching the Lake of the Ozarks, and the Grand Glaize Arm extends another 15 miles (24 km) before reaching the Osage River within the lake.

The creek as recognized by the Geographic Names Information System (GNIS) is spelled as one word. However it is widely spelled as two words Grand Glaize. It should not be confused with the Grand Glaize Creek which is a tributary to the Meramec River in St. Louis County, Missouri.

The creek is formed by the confluence of Dry Auglaize Creek and Wet Glaize Creek about one mile north of Toronto, Missouri in Camden County. From there it flows north into Miller County. It passes near Brumley and passes under the Grand Auglaize Bridge.

According to the Missouri Department of Natural Resources the lowest flow that could be expected in a 10-day period is 16 cubic feet (0.45 m^{3}) a second. The creek becomes part of the Lake of the Ozarks at the extreme southeast corner of Lake of the Ozarks State Park.

== Location ==
Mouth
Grandglaize Arm of the Lake of the Ozarks, Miller County, Missouri: 38°05′05″N 92°32′14″W
Source
Confluence of Dry Auglaize Creek and Wet Glaize Creek in Camden County, Missouri: 38°01′12″N 92°31′18″W

== Bridge ==
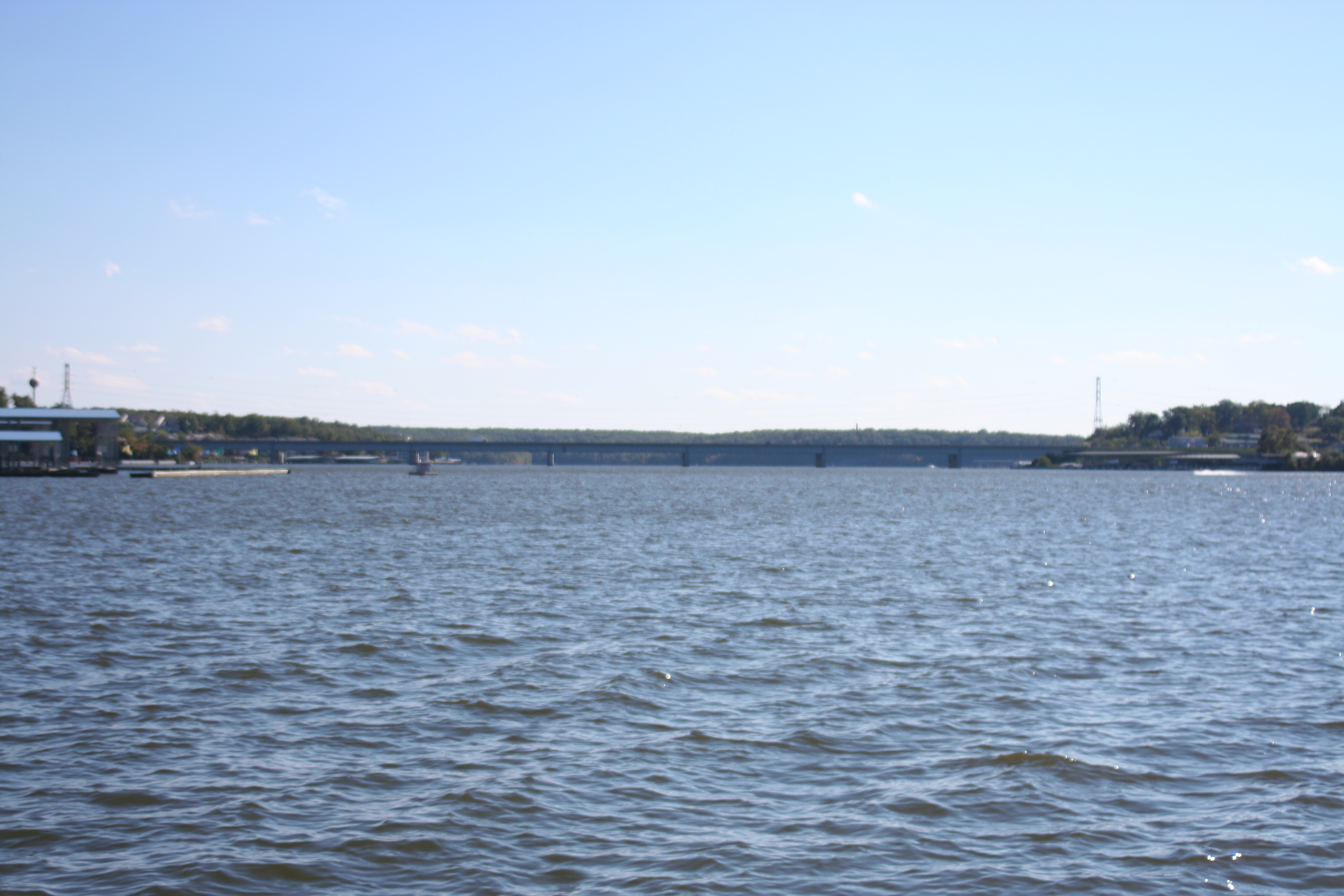
Grand Glaize Bridge in 2005

When Bagnell Dam was built to impound the Osage River, it also impounded the creeks which had previously flowed into the river. The Grand Glaize Bridge carried U.S. Highway 54 over what is now the Grand Glaize arm of the lake. The bridge was known as the "Upside-Down Bridge" because the supporting structure was built below the deck to allow for an unobstructed view of the lake. The bridge was infamous for having very narrow lanes, no shoulders, and steel railings as barriers. The bridge was replaced in the 1980s, when a wider bridge was constructed next to it. The new bridge carried Highway 54 and the old bridge was restricted to bicycles and pedestrians. In the 1990s, the original bridge was demolished and replaced with a new bridge to carry two lanes of westbound Highway 54. The 1980s bridge was changed to carry two lanes of eastbound Highway 54. In 2026, the bridge is renamed in honor of Osage Beach officer Phylicia Carson.

== Origin of the name ==
Besides the Lake of the Ozarks creek and the creek near St. Louis there is also an Auglaize River in northwestern Ohio.

According to List of Ohio county name etymologies the etymology could be French for eau glaise meaning 'dirty water' (though the reference is to 'clay'). The Ohio site also mentions that it could be a Native American term for 'fallen timbers' or 'overgrown with brush', or French 'at the (salt) lick'. It could have been the French term la glace [*aux glaces?], which means 'mirror', or 'ice' ['at the ices']. There is something to be said for the unattested eau glaise 'clay water', like attested terre glaise 'clay soil', but both Ramsey and Stewart agree that Auglaize (and variants, implying "*aux glaises") is American French for 'at the lick(s)', literally 'at the clays', where wild beasts came to lick salt and minerals from the soil, and fulfilling the lacuna in standard French for a "salt lick." The spelling "glaize" is archaic (as in Cotgrave's French-English dictionary of 1611). In addition, in Arkansas there is a creek and mountain Glazypeau, from French glaise à Paul 'Paul's lick'. The assumed indigenous American (Algonquian) "'fallen timbers' or 'overgrown with brush'" has no support without any attested etymons supplied and would not match phonetically in the case of Shawnee.

The GNIS cites several variant names for Grandglaize Creek, including: Auglaize Creek, Dry Glaize Creek, Glaize Creek, Glaze Creek, Grand Anglais Creek, Grand Anglaise Creek, Grand Auglaise River, Grand Auglaize Creek, and Wet Glaize Creek.

== See also ==
- List of rivers of Missouri
- Lake of the Ozarks
