= Hurricane Deck Bridge =

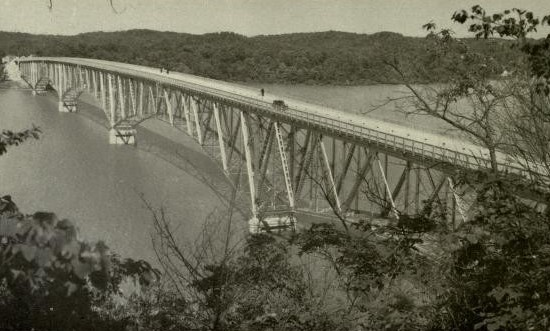
- The original bridge in 1939
- Coordinates: 38°07′32″N 92°48′15″W
- Carries: 2 lanes of Route 5
- Crosses: Osage Arm; Lake of the Ozarks
- Locale: Hurricane Deck, Missouri
- Maintained by: Missouri DOT
- ID number: MoDOT K-961R

Characteristics
- Design: Truss arch bridge
- Total length: 2,280.3 feet (695.0 m)
- Width: 28.0 feet (8.5 m)
- Height: 60 feet (18 m) to 65 feet (20 m) (depending on water levels).
- Longest span: 462.8 feet (141.1 m)

History
- Construction start: 1934
- Opened: 1936; 89 years ago (original bridge); 2013; 12 years ago (replacement bridge)

The Hurricane Deck Bridge was a truss arch bridge located on Lake of the Ozarks in the unincorporated community of Hurricane Deck in Camden County, Missouri. It carried Missouri Route 5 across the Osage Arm of the lake. It was perhaps one of the most distinctive features on the lake. It was the only truss-type bridge remaining on the lake. The American Institute of Steel Construction selected the bridge as the most beautiful steel span built in 1936. It was about half a mile long. The bridge was replaced in 2013.

== History ==
Construction for the bridge began in 1934 and was completed in 1936. The bridge was one of three bridges on the lake constructed with the truss support below the deck enabling passengers to see the lake clearly. The bridge construction was similar to that of the original Niangua Bridge. Before the bridge was built, cars were moved across the lake by ferry.

At one time the bridge was originally a toll bridge. The prices to pass were 40 cents for car and driver, 5 cents for each additional passenger; cars towing trailers had to pay 60 cents plus the nickel surcharge for each additional passenger. One could also save a dime by purchasing a round trip toll.

In 2012, MODOT began construction to replace the bridge with a Delta Frame Bridge, also known as the new Hurricane Deck Bridge. It opened to traffic in September 2013. The old Hurricane Deck Bridge was demolished via implosion in three phase, two in December 2013 and the last one done in January 2014.
