= Freshwater shoreline management =

Lake management strategy

Freshwater shoreline management involves assessing and protecting lakes, rivers, and other freshwater shorelines from excessive development or other anthropogenic disturbances.

Shoreline management involves the long-term monitoring of watershed and shoreline revitalisation projects. Freshwater shoreline management is frequently run by local conservation authorities through state, provincial, and federal lake partner programs. These programs have been used as a method of tracking shoreline change over time, determining areas of concern, and educating shoreline property owners.

== History ==
The concept of Freshwater Shoreline Management evolved from ideas developed for the Integrated Coastal Zone Management (ICZM), which emerged from the 1992 United Nations Conference on Environment and Development. In Canada, a coastal zone management plan was completed by 1996 using the ICZM framework. Freshwater management programs utilized the coastal zone management plan to create freshwater management plans to address the growing concerns for the environment that had been aired since the 1960s in Canadian society.

Anthropogenic effects on watersheds were increasing globally in the 1900s, with nutrient loading of phosphorus, nitrogen, and sulfur causing eutrophication and acidification of water bodies. These effects are primarily caused by the human development of shorelines, agricultural runoff of chemicals and fertilizers, human litter, and sewage/wastewater. To manage these impacts, local and regional organizations began conducting watershed monitoring programs to detect long-term environmental changes and establish their causes.

== Usage ==
Anthropogenic effects on lakes, such as freshwater usage, shoreline development, recreational use, agriculture, and retaining walls, can negatively impact aquatic and terrestrial organisms that rely on the shoreline of a lake for habitat. The anthropogenic effects can also cause eutrophication and acidification of lakes, which impacts organisms within the water itself and can also cause harm to human health. It can have the added effect of decreasing property values and tourism in the lake communities due to some beaches being unsafe to swim in because of pollutants.

Since it may be modified to match the needs of the watershed and be applied to the current land use nearby, freshwater shoreline management is useful for community-based monitoring. The Lake Ontario Shoreline Management Plan is an example of how communities can use freshwater shoreline management. Programs such as this were developed by conservation authorities and citizens alongside regional and provincial governments to perform shoreline mapping and assessment, public consultation/education, and implement long-term monitoring of the watershed and shoreline.

The Muskoka Watershed Council has also performed shoreline assessments using the Love Your Lakes Program to survey the shoreline of Lake Bella in the Muskoka District. It showed that the natural shoreline decreased from 96% in 2002 to 80% in 2007, impacting the overall water quality as it allows for increased nutrient runoff, negatively impacting biodiversity as it decreases habitat for fish, insects, and birds. This program has increased local education on lake health and stewardship of revitalizing shorelines.

=== Climate Change Impacts ===
Climate change has been found to affect freshwater shoreline communities. Effects such as increased warming of the water bodies, increased storm runoff, the quickening of yearly ice melt and limited amounts of winter ice, and increased wave height during storms, which increases the potential of erosion, were all found to potentially affect lake shorelines.

Shoreline management has been identified as a method to mitigate climate change impacts such as potential flooding and nutrient loading from frequent and higher-intensity storms. That can occur as shorelines naturalize, which can increase filtration and decrease sediment and nutrient runoff.

=== Example: Love Your Lakes Program ===
The Love Your Lakes Program is an example of a Shoreline Assessment and Revitalization program used in Canada. It was developed under the Canadian Ministry of Environment and Climate Change (MECC) Lake Partner Program as a joint effort between Watersheds Canada, MECC, and the Canadian Wildlife Federation.

The program allows lake owners and organizations to apply to have their shorelines assessed and discusses methods that individuals and the community can use to revitalize their shorelines. Naturalization, using native plant species along the shoreline to create a buffer, is often recommended as this limits erosion from wake action and can decrease nutrient runoff from lawn maintenance or farming activities. To this date, almost 200 lakes have been assessed by the program. This has led to increased community awareness and shoreline naturalization, which has transformed up to 300 shoreline properties.
