= P.A. Sanning Store =

- U.S. National Register of Historic Places
- Location within Missouri Location within the United States
- Location: 256 MO H, Mary's Home, Missouri
- Coordinates: 38°18′22″N 92°21′29″W
- Area: 1 acre (0.40 ha)
- Built: 1906
- Built by: Sanning, Henry J.
- Architectural style: Late 19th And Early 20th Century American Movements
- NRHP reference No.: 05000613
- Added to NRHP: June 16, 2005

P.A. Sanning Store, also known as E.M. Schell & Company and The Corner Market, is a historic general store located at Mary's Home, Miller County, Missouri. It was built in 1906, and is a one-story, rectangular frame building on a concrete foundation. It has a medium pitched hipped roof and features an elaborate pressed galvanized metal "boomtown" front cornice.

It was added to the National Register of Historic Places in 2005.
