= Lakeside, Missouri =

- Inactive City
- Location in Miller County and the state of Missouri
- Coordinates: 38°12′16″N 92°37′20″W
- Country: United States
- State: Missouri
- County: Miller

Area
  - Total: 0.64 sq mi (1.66 km^{2})
  - Land: 0.34 sq mi (0.89 km^{2})
  - Water: 0.30 sq mi (0.77 km^{2})
- Elevation: 558 ft (170 m)

Population (2020)
  - Total: 0
  - Density: 0/sq mi (0/km^{2})
- Time zone: UTC-6 (Central (CST))
  - Summer (DST): UTC-5 (CDT)
- FIPS code: 29-40142
- GNIS feature ID: 2395613

Lakeside is an inactive city in Miller County, Missouri, United States, located along the Osage River near the Bagnell Dam. The population was 37 at the 2000 census. However, as of the 2020 census, the city's population was 0, with only one housing unit.

== History ==
The city had developed at the time of construction of the Bagnell Dam and power plant, and many workers lived here. Few people were needed as residents to administer the complex, but the Union Electric Administration Building-Lakeside was built in association with the dam project. The building was added to the National Register of Historic Places in 1998. A boundary increase for the property was recorded as an addition in 2011.

== Geography ==
Lakeside is located in western Miller County, adjacent to Bagnell Dam. It is bordered to the north, west, and south by the city of Lake Ozark. According to the U.S. Census Bureau, the city limits comprise a total area of 0.64 square miles (1.7 km^{2}), of which 0.35 square miles (0.91 km^{2}) are land and 0.30 square miles (0.78 km^{2}), or 46.18%, are water, including the part of Lake of the Ozarks directly upstream from the dam, and the Osage River directly downstream.

=== Climate ===
Climate data for Lakeside, Missouri (1991–2020)
Month	Jan	Feb	Mar	Apr	May	Jun	Jul	Aug	Sep	Oct	Nov	Dec	Year
Mean daily maximum °F (°C)	44.0 (6.7)	48.7 (9.3)	59.0 (15.0)	69.1 (20.6)	76.9 (24.9)	85.0 (29.4)	89.4 (31.9)	88.3 (31.3)	81.1 (27.3)	70.5 (21.4)	58.5 (14.7)	47.9 (8.8)	68.2 (20.1)
Daily mean °F (°C)	34.6 (1.4)	38.7 (3.7)	48.0 (8.9)	57.9 (14.4)	66.3 (19.1)	75.0 (23.9)	79.5 (26.4)	78.2 (25.7)	70.8 (21.6)	59.9 (15.5)	48.7 (9.3)	38.9 (3.8)	58.0 (14.5)
Mean daily minimum °F (°C)	25.3 (−3.7)	28.6 (−1.9)	37.1 (2.8)	46.8 (8.2)	55.7 (13.2)	65.0 (18.3)	69.5 (20.8)	68.2 (20.1)	60.5 (15.8)	49.2 (9.6)	38.9 (3.8)	29.9 (−1.2)	47.9 (8.8)
Average precipitation inches (mm)	2.15 (55)	2.05 (52)	2.99 (76)	4.98 (126)	5.54 (141)	4.16 (106)	3.83 (97)	4.20 (107)	4.16 (106)	3.42 (87)	2.97 (75)	2.12 (54)	42.57 (1,082)
Average snowfall inches (cm)	1.7 (4.3)	0.6 (1.5)	0.3 (0.76)	0.0 (0.0)	0.0 (0.0)	0.0 (0.0)	0.0 (0.0)	0.0 (0.0)	0.0 (0.0)	0.0 (0.0)	0.0 (0.0)	1.7 (4.3)	4.3 (10.86)
Source: NOAA

== Demographics ==
Historical population
Census	Pop.	Note	%±
1970	124		—
1980	115		−7.3%
1990	38		−67.0%
2000	37		−2.6%
2010	0		−100.0%
2020	0		—
U.S. Decennial Census

As of the census of 2000, there were 37 people, 14 households, and 13 families residing in the city. The population density was 106.0 inhabitants per square mile (40.9/km^{2}). There were 15 housing units at an average density of 43.0 per square mile (16.6/km^{2}). The racial makeup of the city was 100.00% White.

There were 14 households, out of which 42.9% had children under the age of 18 living with them, 92.9% were married couples living together, and 7.1% were non-families. 7.1% of all households were made up of individuals, and none had someone living alone who was 65 years of age or older. The average household size was 2.64 and the average family size was 2.77.

In the city, the population was spread out, with 21.6% under the age of 18, 2.7% from 18 to 24, 40.5% from 25 to 44, and 35.1% from 45 to 64. The median age was 44 years. For every 100 females, there were 146.7 males. For every 100 females age 18 and over, there were 107.1 males.

The median income for a household in the city was $69,375, and the median income for a family was $72,500. Males had a median income of $63,750 versus $20,625 for females. The per capita income for the city was $32,786. None of the population were below the poverty line.

By the 2010 census, the population had dropped to 0.
