= Marys Home, Missouri =

Unincorporated community in Missouri, U.S.

Coordinates: 38°18′20″N 92°21′19″W

Marys Home is an unincorporated community in northern Miller County, in the U.S. state of Missouri. The community is on Missouri Route H, approximately two miles north of the Osage River. The town of Eugene in the southwest corner of Cole County is about four miles to the northwest, by Route H and Missouri Route 17.

== History ==
Marys Home originally developed in the 1880s around the St. Mary's Roman Catholic Church. The church and community are named after the Virgin Mary. A post office was established as Mary's Home in 1884, and remained in operation until it was discontinued in 1918.

The P.A. Sanning Store was added to the National Register of Historic Places in 2005.
