= Lake of the Ozarks =

Reservoir in Missouri, United States

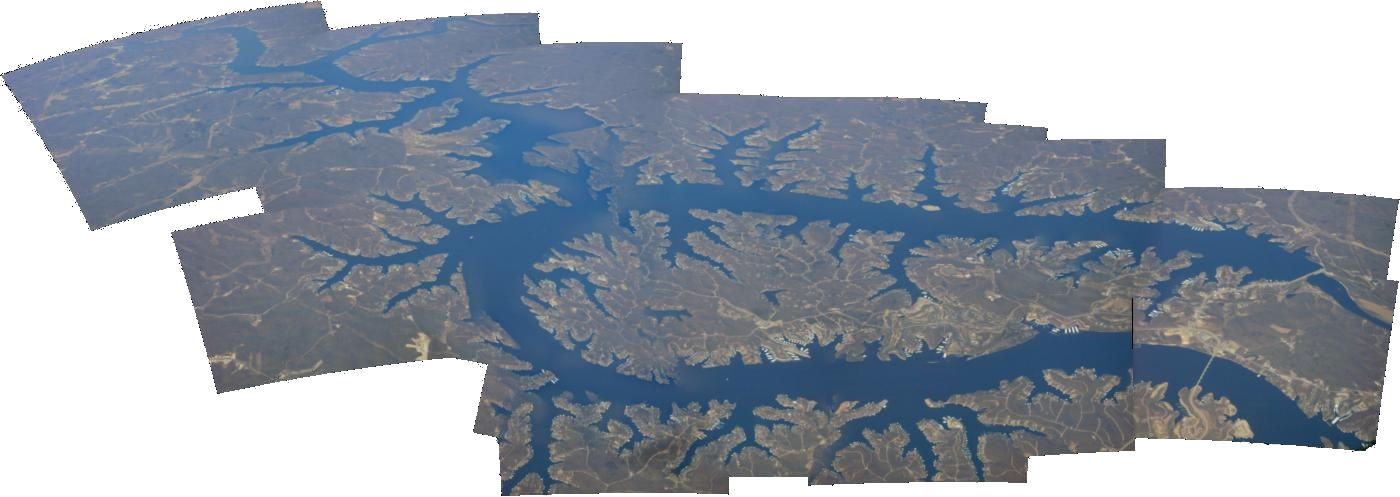
- Aerial panorama of Lake of the Ozarks

- Location within Missouri Location within the United States
- Interactive map of Lake of the Ozarks
- Location: Benton, Camden, Miller, and Morgan Counties in Missouri
- Coordinates: 38°12′09″N 92°37′35″W
- Type: Reservoir
- Primary inflows: Grandglaize Creek; Gravois Creek; Niangua River; Osage River
- Primary outflows: Osage River
- Catchment area: 14,000 sq mi (36,300 km^{2})
- Basin countries: United States
- Managing agency: Ameren Missouri
- Built: August 6, 1929; 96 years ago
- First flooded: February 2, 1931; 95 years ago
- Max. length: 93 miles (150 km)
- Max. width: 1 mile (1.6 km)
- Surface area: 54,000 acres (220 km^{2})
- Average depth: 70 ft (21 m)
- Max. depth: 130 ft (40 m)
- Water volume: 1,927,000 acre⋅ft (2.377×10^{9} m^{3})
- Residence time: 2-4 months
- Shore length^{1}: 1,150 miles (1,850 km)
- Surface elevation: 659 ft (201 m)
- Settlements: Camdenton; Gravois Mills; Lake Ozark; Laurie; Osage Beach; Sunrise Beach; Village of Four Seasons
- ^{1} Shore length is not a well-defined measure.

Lake of the Ozarks is a reservoir created by impounding the Osage River in the northern part of the Ozarks in central Missouri. Parts of three smaller tributaries to the Osage are included in the impoundment: the Niangua River, Grandglaize Creek, and Gravois Creek. The lake has a surface area of 54,000 acres (220 km^{2}) and 1,150 miles (1,850 km) of shoreline. The main channel of the Osage Arm stretches 92 miles (148 km) from one end to the other. The total drainage area is over 14,000 square miles (36,000 km^{2}). The lake's serpentine shape has earned it the nickname "the Missouri Dragon", which has, in turn, inspired the names of local institutions such as the Magic Dragon Street Meet.

== History ==
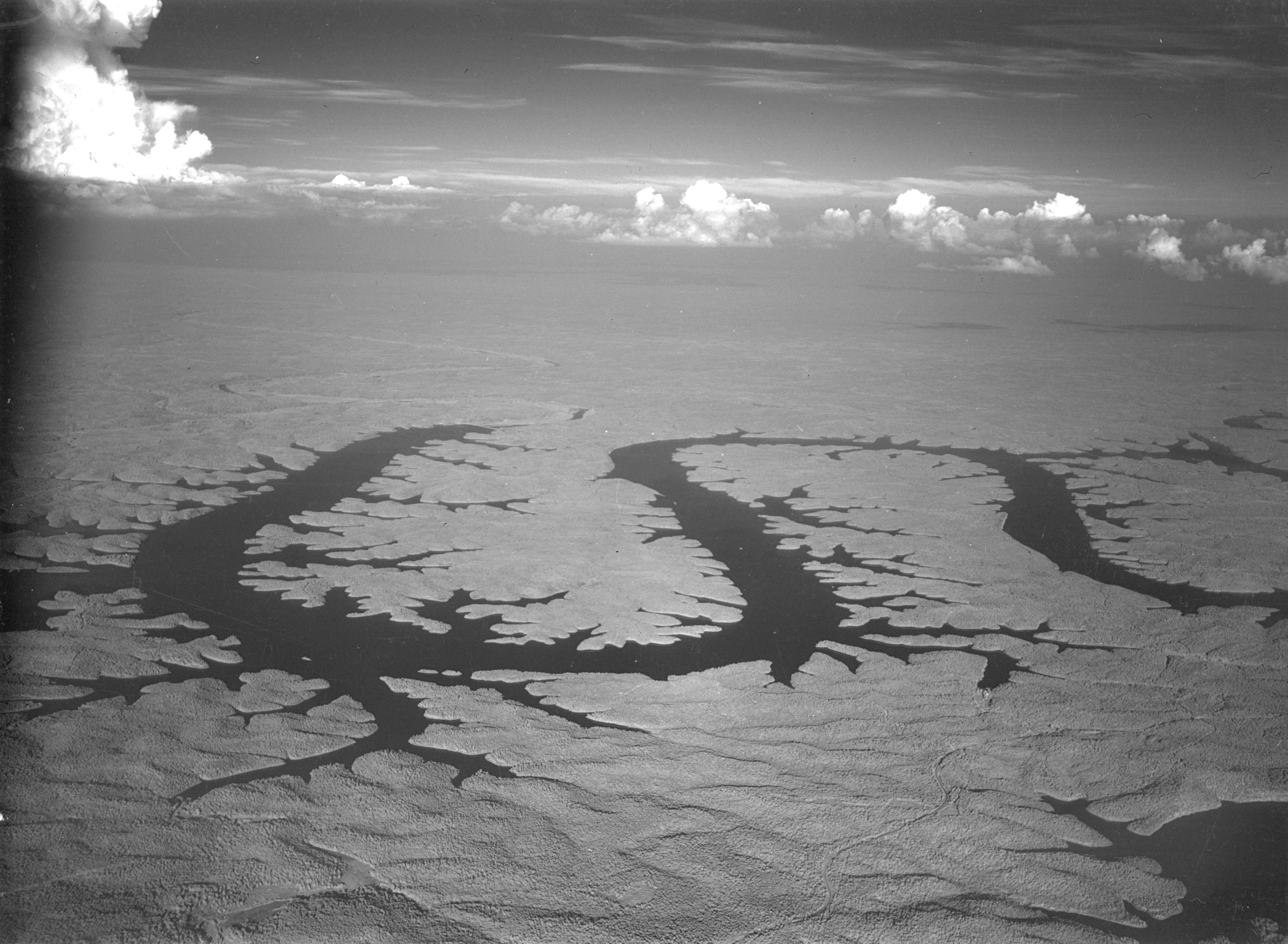
A 1945 aerial view of Lake of the Ozarks

A hydroelectric power plant on the Osage River was first pursued by Kansas City developer Ralph Street in 1912. He put together the initial funding and began building roads, railroads, and infrastructure necessary to begin construction of a dam, with a plan to impound a much smaller lake. In the mid-1920s, Street's funding dried up, and he abandoned the effort.

The lake was created by the construction of the 2,543-foot-long (775 m) Bagnell Dam by the Union Electric Company of St. Louis, Missouri. The principal engineering firm was Stone and Webster. It required clearing of Old Linn Creek town. This resulted in some cemeteries still being underwater, as they were not removed due to not being found during clearing. Construction began August 8, 1929, and was completed in April 1931; the lake reached spillway elevation on May 20, 1931. On May 30, 1931, the lake officially opened to boat traffic. From above, the lake is shaped somewhat like a dragon.

During construction, the lake was referred to as Osage Reservoir or Lake Osage. The Missouri General Assembly officially named it Lake Benton after Senator Thomas Hart Benton. None of the names stuck, as it was popularly referred to by its location at the northern edge of the Ozarks. The electric generating station, however, is still referred to by the utility company as the Osage Hydroelectric Plant.

While some sources indicate that more than 20 towns, villages, and settlements were permanently flooded to create the lake, the actual number was closer to eight. Several other settlements had been previously abandoned, were relocated to make way for the lake, or were on high enough ground that the creation of the lake did not affect them.

At the time of construction, Lake of the Ozarks was the largest man-made lake in the United States and one of the largest in the world. It was created to provide hydroelectric power for customers of Union Electric, but it quickly became a significant tourist destination. Most of its shoreline is privately owned, unlike many flood-control lakes in the region that were constructed by the U.S. Army Corps of Engineers. The relatively stable surface elevation has created conditions suitable for private development within a few feet of the shoreline.

In 2011, the Federal Energy Regulatory Commission (FERC) renewed the lease for the power plant operated by Ameren Missouri. In the process, the FERC determined that numerous homes and structures were encroaching on utility land in violation of federal regulations. According to the Boston Globe, this issue "has triggered panic in the area's lakefront communities and led to a growing battle among regulators, a utility company, land attorneys, and the state's congressional delegation."

In 2015, FERC issued an order allowing Ameren Missouri to pursue permits for about 215 structures that were termed as "nonconforming". Those were the structures remaining in limbo after Ameren was given approval to redraw the project lines encompassing Lake of the Ozarks.

The lake has been impacted by several extreme weather events. In 2019, the lake was hit hard during the Midwest floods. In 2021, the lake froze over during a cold wave, the first time the lake had frozen over in 20 years, according to Ameren Missouri. In 2022, the lake levels were low due to a drought.

== Geography ==
The Lake of the Ozarks is located on the Ozark Plateau, with Bagnell Dam lying at an elevation of 659 feet (201 m) above sea level. It lies in central Missouri on the Salem Plateau of the Ozarks. The lake extends across four Missouri counties, from Benton County in the west through Camden and Morgan Counties to Miller County in the east.

The reservoir is impounded at its northeastern end by Bagnell Dam, and the Osage River is both its primary inflow and outflow. Long and winding in shape, the lake consists of the main, 93-mile-long (150 km) Osage River channel and several arms, each fed by a different tributary. The southwestern arm is fed by the Niangua and Little Niangua rivers, the southeastern arm by Grandglaize Creek, and the northern arm by several streams including Gravois, Indian, and Little Gravois creeks. The Osage River feeds into the lake at the most western arm of the lake east of Warsaw, Missouri, beyond that is Lake Truman. Many smaller tributaries also drain into the lake, creating numerous small coves and indentations in its shore. As a result, the lake has around 1,150 miles (1,850 km) of shoreline.

== Cities and towns ==
Numerous settlements are located near or on the Lake of the Ozarks. With a population of 4,570, the largest city is Osage Beach, which sits where the lake's southeastern arm joins the main channel. The second largest is the city of Camdenton, located a few miles east of the southwestern arm. Lake Ozark lies immediately north of Osage Beach and just south of Bagnell Dam. Other, smaller communities along or near the lake include (from east to west): Kaiser, Lakeside, Linn Creek, Village of Four Seasons, Rocky Mount, Sunrise Beach, Hurricane Deck, Gravois Mills, Laurie, and Lakeview Heights.

== Hydrography ==
The Lake of the Ozarks has a storage capacity around 1,927,000 acre-feet (2.377×10^{9} m^{3}). When filled to that volume, it has a surface elevation of 660 feet (200 m) and occupies a surface area of approximately 54,000 acres (220 km^{2}). The lake rarely varies in surface elevation by more than 5 feet (1.5 m). As it was constructed for power generation, not flood control, the lake has only limited flood-control capacity.

Due to its large volume and surface area, various sources identify the Lake of the Ozarks as either the largest reservoir in Missouri or the second largest after Truman Reservoir.

== Infrastructure ==
=== Bridges and dams ===
A large number of bridges had been constructed for efficient crossing of the lake. The Niangua Route 5 Bridge, built in 1936, was replaced by a girder bridge in 2003. The Niangua Arm US 54 Bridge, built in 1931, was replaced by a girder bridge in 1999.

==== Hurricane Deck Bridge ====
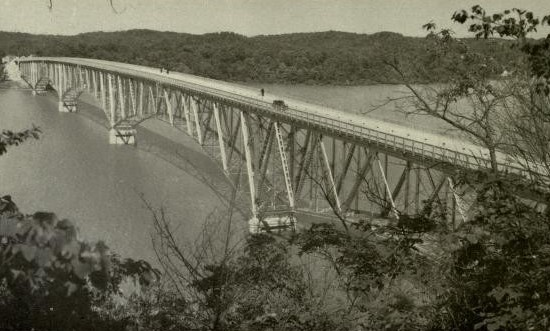
Hurricane Deck Bridge, 1939-2013

The Hurricane Deck Bridge is a delta-frame bridge located in the west side of Lake of the Ozarks. Stretching over 2,280.3 ft (695 m) long and 28.0 ft (9 m) wide, the bridge was established to connect Laurie with Camdenton. The bridge was originally constructed in 1934 as a truss-arch bridge, but this bridge was replaced in 2013. The first bridge's structure was similar to the structure of the I-35W Mississippi River bridge, which had collapsed six years before the bridge was destroyed. After the replacement opened in 2013, the original bridge was destroyed.

==== Police Officer Phylicia Carson Memorial Bridge ====
Formerly known as the Grand Glaize Bridge, the Police Officer Phylicia Carson Memorial Bridge was initially built in 1930. The bridge crosses the Grand Glaize Arm of the lake in Osage Beach. It carries U.S. Route 54 and connects Osage Beach to Camdenton. Originally, one girder bridge carried both directions of traffic; a second girder bridge was constructed in 1984, enabling traffic to pass over the lake in both directions using separate bridges. It has undergone a significant number of improvements since its original construction, and now supports three lanes of traffic in both directions.

The bridge was named "Police Officer Phylicia Carson Memorial Bridge" in August 2025 to honor an Osage Beach police officer who lost her life during a high speed pursuit in August 2024.

==== Bagnell Dam ====
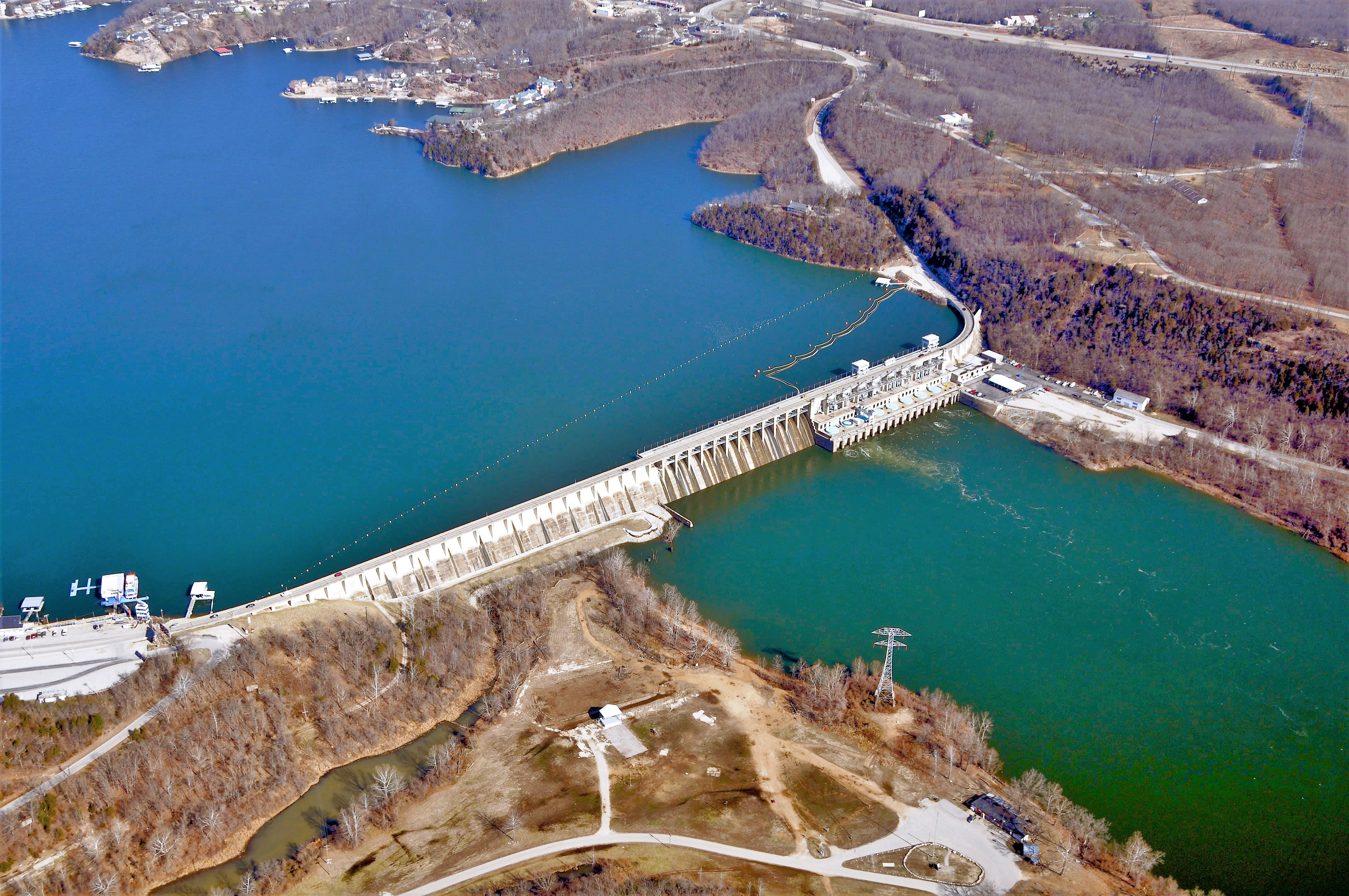
Bagnell Dam

Originally constructed in 1931, Bagnell Dam is the only major dam supporting Lake of the Ozarks. Located in Miller County near Camden County, the dam is 2,543 ft (775 m) long and 148 ft (48 m) tall. The dam was originally constructed by the Union Electric Company (now Ameren) to provide hydroelectric power to the nearby Osage Powerplant (located near the base of the dam) and support two-way traffic on a narrow highway above the dam (Bagnell Dam Boulevard). Since its original construction, the dam has undergone a number of significant infrastructure upgrades throughout the 2010s. The dam has 12 floodgates, which fully open when the lake floods. In 2019, the floodgates were open due to the Lake of the Ozarks being hit by flooding.

==== Lake of the Ozarks Community Bridge ====
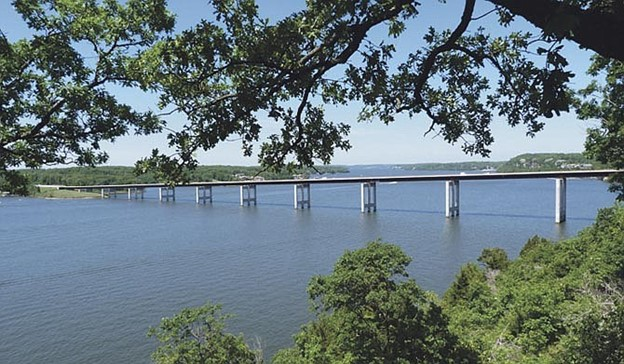
Lake of the Ozarks Community Bridge

The Lake of the Ozarks Community Bridge is a continuous truss bridge in Lake Ozark. The bridge is over 2,695 ft (821 m) long and 72 ft (22 m) wide. Built in 1998, it is one of the newest bridges in the Lake of the Ozarks area, primarily built to connect the east (towards Lake Ozark and Osage Beach) and west sides (towards Sunrise Beach and Camdenton) of Lake of the Ozarks. The bridge was the only toll bridge in the Lake of the Ozarks area and only toll bridge in Missouri with a toll that varies between seasons. The bridge tolls stopped on April 30, 2024. The bridge was originally expected to be toll-free by 2026.

=== Highways ===
U.S. Route 54 runs east–west across the reservoir's southwestern arm and then generally northeast–southwest along its eastern shoreline, crossing the southeastern arm at Osage Beach and crosses the Grand Glaize Bridge. Missouri Route 5 runs generally north–south along the lake's western shoreline, crossing the main channel at Hurricane Deck. Missouri Route 7 runs generally northwest–southeast to the lake's southwest, crossing the southwestern arm. Missouri Route 134 runs southeast from U.S. 54 north of Osage Beach to its southern terminus in Lake of the Ozarks State Park. Route 42 connects to Route 134 and US 54 in Osage Beach. Route 242 connects US 54 to near Village of Four Seasons. In addition, a network of supplemental state routes provides access to various points along the lake shore.

== Management ==
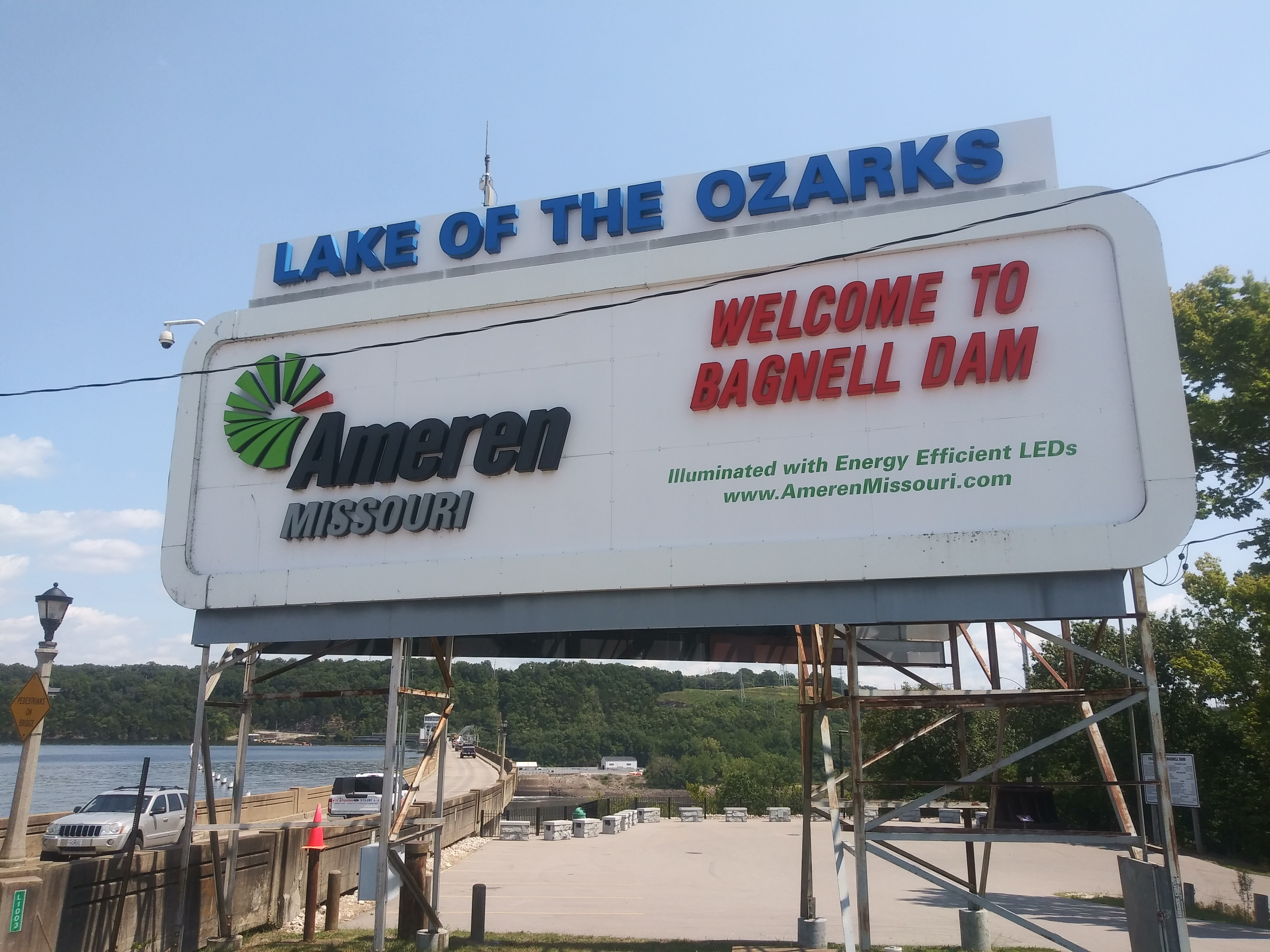
Sign near Bagnell Dam highlighting the use of Ameren energy

Bagnell Dam is operated and maintained by Ameren Missouri, the successor of Union Electric, under the authority of a permit issued by the FERC. Ameren Missouri is also responsible for managing both the shoreline and water levels of the lake. All land surrounding the lake that is within the project boundary defined by the FERC is under the company's jurisdiction. Any improvements to the shoreline, including docks, seawalls, and other structures, require permission from Ameren Missouri prior to construction.

== Tourism and recreation ==
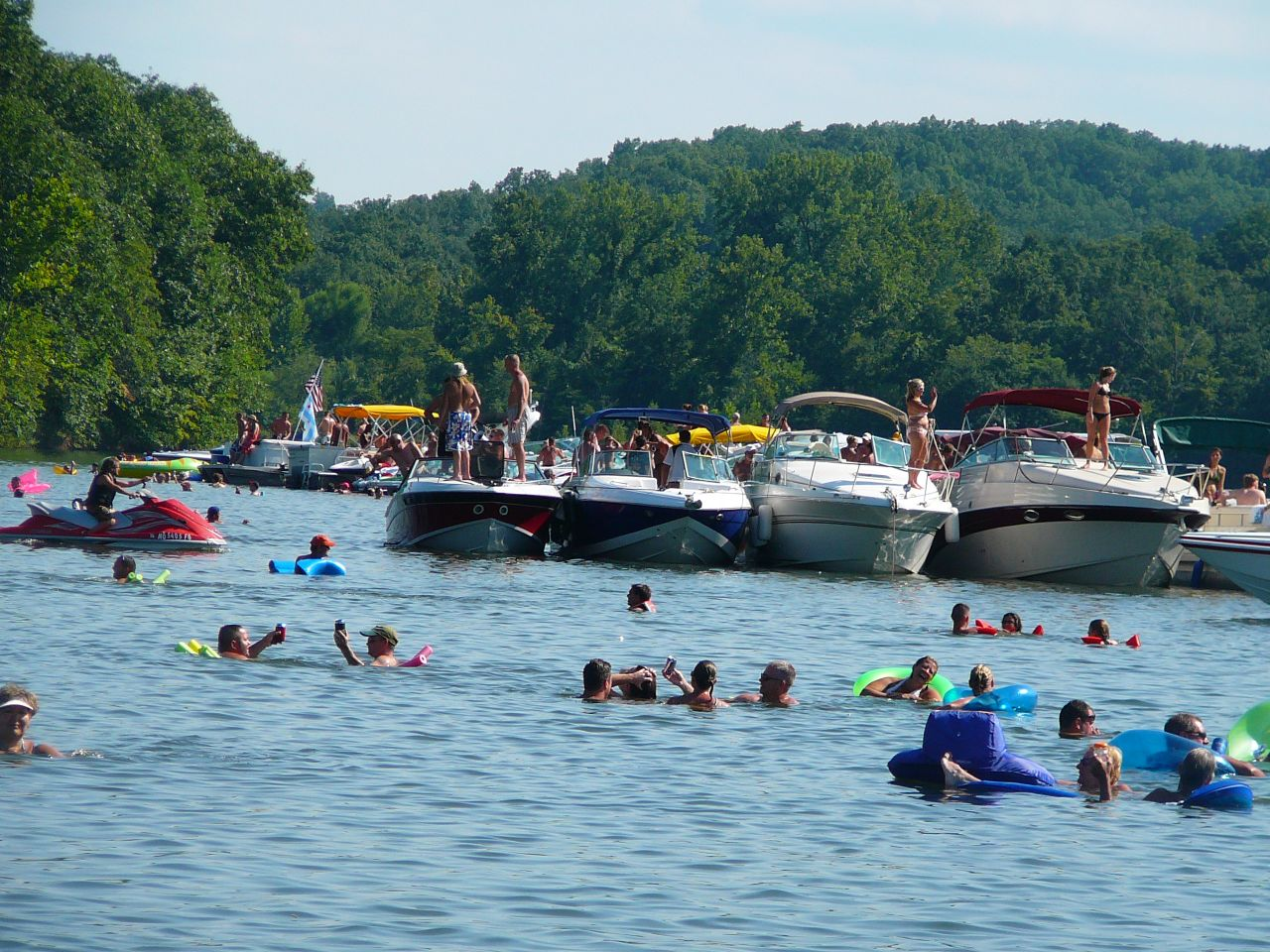
Anderson Hollow Cove, informally known as Party Cove, in 2007

During the process of land acquisition for the lake during the 1920s, 17,500 acres (71 km^{2}) of land were set aside for a national park along the Grand Glaize Arm of the lake. In 1946, this land was acquired by the State of Missouri for Lake of the Ozarks State Park, the largest state park in Missouri. Another state park on the shores of the lake is Ha Ha Tonka State Park on the Niangua Arm of the lake.

Lake of the Ozarks State Park is home to Party Cove, a gathering spot that a The New York Times writer called the "oldest established permanent floating bacchanal in the country." The Missouri State Water Patrol has estimated that the cove attracts up to 3,000 boats during the Fourth of July weekend.

On April 1, 2012, biologist and TV personality Jeremy Wade visited the lake and filmed an episode on the large catfish that could be caught there.

In 2021, Osage Casino management announced it planned to build in the Lake of the Ozarks area. Construction had not begun, but demolition of the former Quality Inn was completed in early 2022 where the casino will be located. A house joint resolution had to be passed allowing a casino to be built near the Osage River. It was placed on the November 2024 ballot as Amendment 5 but was rejected by voters.

An amusement park named Oasis at Lakeport is planned to open in 2026 delayed from 2025. It will include a Marriott Hotel that is scheduled to open in 2027 delayed from 2026.

=== Events ===
Several annual events are hosted at the lake. Annual powerboat races, known as the Lake of the Ozarks Shootout, take place at the end of every summer typically the weekend before Labor Day. On the last Saturday of February of every year, the Lake of the Ozarks holds a polar bear plunge event as a fundraiser for Special Olympics in Missouri. The event has existed for over thirty years.

== In popular media ==
The TV series Ozark is set in Osage Beach, though filmed in the US state of Georgia. In November 2017, it was reported that the series helped increase tourism and notoriety of the Lake of the Ozarks, but did not have a significant economic impact. In February 2018, a real-life restaurant called Marty Byrde's, inspired by the series, was opened in Lake Ozark, Missouri, and includes menu items based on the show, including Ruth's Smoked Wings.

The A&E documentary series "Ozark Law" follows officers of law enforcement from Lake Ozark, Osage Beach, and Sunrise Beach as they tackle the problems that arise from the millions of tourists that visit their small towns for the summer. It premiered on January 8, 2025, and has run for multiple seasons.

The HGTV television series Lakefront Empire explores lakeside homes at the Lake of the Ozarks.

== See also ==
- List of largest reservoirs in the United States
- Margaritaville Lake Resort
