= Brumley, Missouri =

- Town
- Location in Miller County and the state of Missouri
- Coordinates: 38°05′17″N 92°29′04″W
- Country: United States
- State: Missouri
- County: Miller

Area
  - Total: 0.55 sq mi (1.43 km^{2})
  - Land: 0.55 sq mi (1.43 km^{2})
  - Water: 0 sq mi (0.00 km^{2})
- Elevation: 820 ft (250 m)

Population (2020)
  - Total: 69
  - Density: 125.2/sq mi (48.35/km^{2})
- Time zone: UTC-6 (Central (CST))
  - Summer (DST): UTC-5 (CDT)
- ZIP code: 65017
- Area code: 573
- FIPS code: 29-08974
- GNIS feature ID: 2396614

Brumley is a town in Miller County, Missouri, United States. The population was 69 at the 2020 census, down from 91 in 2010.

== History ==
There is uncertainty when Brumley was first laid out. Years given are 1858, 1869, and 1877. The source of the name "Brumley" is also disputed. A post office called Brumley has been in operation since 1863.

== Geography ==
Brumley is in southwestern Miller County, located on Missouri Route 42, east of Lake of the Ozarks State Park and west of Iberia.

According to the U.S. Census Bureau, the town has a total area of 0.55 square miles (1.42 km^{2}), all land.

== Demographics ==
Historical population
Census	Pop.	Note	%±
1930	121		—
1940	100		−17.4%
1950	78		−22.0%
1960	74		−5.1%
1970	87		17.6%
1980	109		25.3%
1990	81		−25.7%
2000	102		25.9%
2010	91		−10.8%
2020	69		−24.2%
U.S. Decennial Census

=== 2010 census ===
At the 2010 census, there were 91 people, 40 households and 24 families living in the village. The population density was 165.5 inhabitants per square mile (63.9/km^{2}). There were 48 housing units at an average density of 87.3 per square mile (33.7/km^{2}). The racial makeup of the village was 78.0% White, 6.6% African American, 4.4% Native American, and 11.0% from two or more races. Hispanic or Latino of any race were 5.5% of the population.

There were 40 households, of which 32.5% had children under the age of 18 living with them, 40.0% were married couples living together, 15.0% had a female householder with no husband present, 5.0% had a male householder with no wife present, and 40.0% were non-families. 37.5% of all households were made up of individuals, and 25% had someone living alone who was 65 years of age or older. The average household size was 2.28 and the average family size was 3.00.

The median age in the village was 40.5 years. 27.5% of residents were under the age of 18; 4.4% were between the ages of 18 and 24; 24.2% were from 25 to 44; 25.3% were from 45 to 64; and 18.7% were 65 years of age or older. The gender makeup of the village was 54.9% male and 45.1% female.

=== 2000 census ===
At the 2000 census, there were 102 people, 41 households and 27 families living in the town. The population density was 211.3 inhabitants per square mile (81.6/km^{2}). There were 49 housing units at an average density of 101.5 per square mile (39.2/km^{2}). The racial makeup of the town was 86.27% White, 7.84% Native American, and 5.88% from two or more races. Hispanic or Latino of any race were 3.92% of the population.

There were 41 households, of which 31.7% had children under the age of 18 living with them, 48.8% were married couples living together, 9.8% had a female householder with no husband present, and 34.1% were non-families. 31.7% of all households were made up of individuals, and 9.8% had someone living alone who was 65 years of age or older. The average household size was 2.49 and the average family size was 3.07.

28.4% of the population were under the age of 18, 5.9% from 18 to 24, 26.5% from 25 to 44, 23.5% from 45 to 64, and 15.7% who were 65 years of age or older. The median age was 36 years. For every 100 females, there were 126.7 males. For every 100 females age 18 and over, there were 102.8 males.

The median household income was $22,500 and the median family income was $25,208. Males had a median income of $23,750 compared with $16,875 for females. The per capita income for the town was $10,468. There were 4.0% of families and 15.8% of the population living below the poverty line, including 16.0% of under-18s and 9.5% of those over 64.
