= Village of Four Seasons, Missouri =

- Village
- Location of Village of Four Seasons, Missouri
- Coordinates: 38°12′4″N 92°42′56″W
- Country: United States
- State: Missouri
- County: Camden

Area
  - Total: 4.71 sq mi (12.20 km^{2})
  - Land: 4.64 sq mi (12.03 km^{2})
  - Water: 0.066 sq mi (0.17 km^{2})
- Elevation: 738 ft (225 m)

Population (2020)
  - Total: 2,383
  - Density: 512.9/sq mi (198.04/km^{2})
- Time zone: UTC-6 (Central (CST))
  - Summer (DST): UTC-5 (CDT)
- ZIP code: 65049
- Area code: 573
- FIPS code: 29-76157
- GNIS feature ID: 1669605
- Website: https://villageoffourseasons.com/

Village of Four Seasons is a village in Camden County, Missouri, United States. As of the 2020 census, Village of Four Seasons had a population of 2,383. The village is situated on the shores of Lake of the Ozarks and is a popular tourist destination along with the other communities in the area.

== Geography ==
According to the United States Census Bureau, the village has a total area of 4.59 square miles (11.89 km^{2}), of which 4.52 square miles (11.71 km^{2}) is land and 0.07 square miles (0.18 km^{2}) is water.

== Demographics ==
Historical population
Census	Pop.	Note	%±
1990	805		—
2000	1,493		85.5%
2010	2,217		48.5%
2020	2,383		7.5%
U.S. Decennial Census

=== 2020 census ===
As of the 2020 census, Village of Four Seasons had a population of 2,383. The median age was 49.0 years. 19.7% of residents were under the age of 18 and 26.1% of residents were 65 years of age or older. For every 100 females there were 98.4 males, and for every 100 females age 18 and over there were 97.8 males age 18 and over.

100.0% of residents lived in urban areas, while 0.0% lived in rural areas.

There were 1,028 households in Village of Four Seasons, of which 25.8% had children under the age of 18 living in them. Of all households, 58.7% were married-couple households, 15.0% were households with a male householder and no spouse or partner present, and 19.0% were households with a female householder and no spouse or partner present. About 23.1% of all households were made up of individuals and 12.3% had someone living alone who was 65 years of age or older.

There were 2,647 housing units, of which 61.2% were vacant. The homeowner vacancy rate was 2.9% and the rental vacancy rate was 40.2%.

Racial composition as of the 2020 census
Race	Number	Percent
White	2,221	93.2%
Black or African American	16	0.7%
American Indian and Alaska Native	11	0.5%
Asian	17	0.7%
Native Hawaiian and Other Pacific Islander	0	0.0%
Some other race	9	0.4%
Two or more races	109	4.6%
Hispanic or Latino (of any race)	51	2.1%

=== 2010 census ===
At the 2010 census, there were 2,217 people, 966 households and 701 families residing in the village. The population density was 490.5 inhabitants per square mile (189.4/km^{2}). There were 2,606 housing units at an average density of 576.5 per square mile (222.6/km^{2}). The racial makeup of the village was 97.6% White, 0.9% African American, 0.5% Native American, 0.4% Asian, 0.2% from other races, and 0.5% from two or more races. Hispanic or Latino of any race were 1.1% of the population.

There were 966 households, of which 26.4% had children under the age of 18 living with them, 63.7% were married couples living together, 5.4% had a female householder with no husband present, 3.5% had a male householder with no wife present, and 27.4% were non-families. 21.9% of all households were made up of individuals, and 7.6% had someone living alone who was 65 years of age or older. The average household size was 2.30 and the average family size was 2.65.

The median age was 47.3 years. 20.2% of residents were under the age of 18; 4.1% were between the ages of 18 and 24; 23.1% were from 25 to 44; 32.4% were from 45 to 64; and 20.3% were 65 years of age or older. The gender makeup of the village was 48.8% male and 51.2% female.

=== 2000 census ===
At the 2000 census, there were 1,493 people, 641 households and 496 families residing in the village. The population density was 334.2 inhabitants per square mile (129.0/km^{2}). There were 2,025 housing units at an average density of 453.3 per square mile (175.0/km^{2}). The racial makeup was 98.19% White, 0.13% African American, 0.07% Native American, 0.33% Asian, 0.20% from other races, and 1.07% from two or more races. Hispanic or Latino of any race were 0.94% of the population.

There were 641 households, of which 23.2% had children under the age of 18 living with them, 68.0% were married couples living together, 7.0% had a female householder with no husband present, and 22.6% were non-families. 18.3% of all households were made up of individuals, and 5.1% had someone living alone who was 65 years of age or older. The average household size was 2.33 and the average family size was 2.62.

19.6% of the population were under the age of 18, 6.3% from 18 to 24, 20.9% from 25 to 44, 36.0% from 45 to 64, and 17.3% who were 65 years of age or older. The median age was 47 years. For every 100 females, there were 91.4 males. For every 100 females age 18 and over, there were 96.2 males.

The median household income was $59,063 and the median family incomewas $60,714. Males had a median income of $42,250 and females $25,417. The per capita income was $36,593. About 8.7% of families and 10.7% of the population were below the poverty line, including 28.1% of those under age 18 and 1.6% of those age 65 or over.
