= Lake of the Ozarks State Park =

State park in Missouri, United States

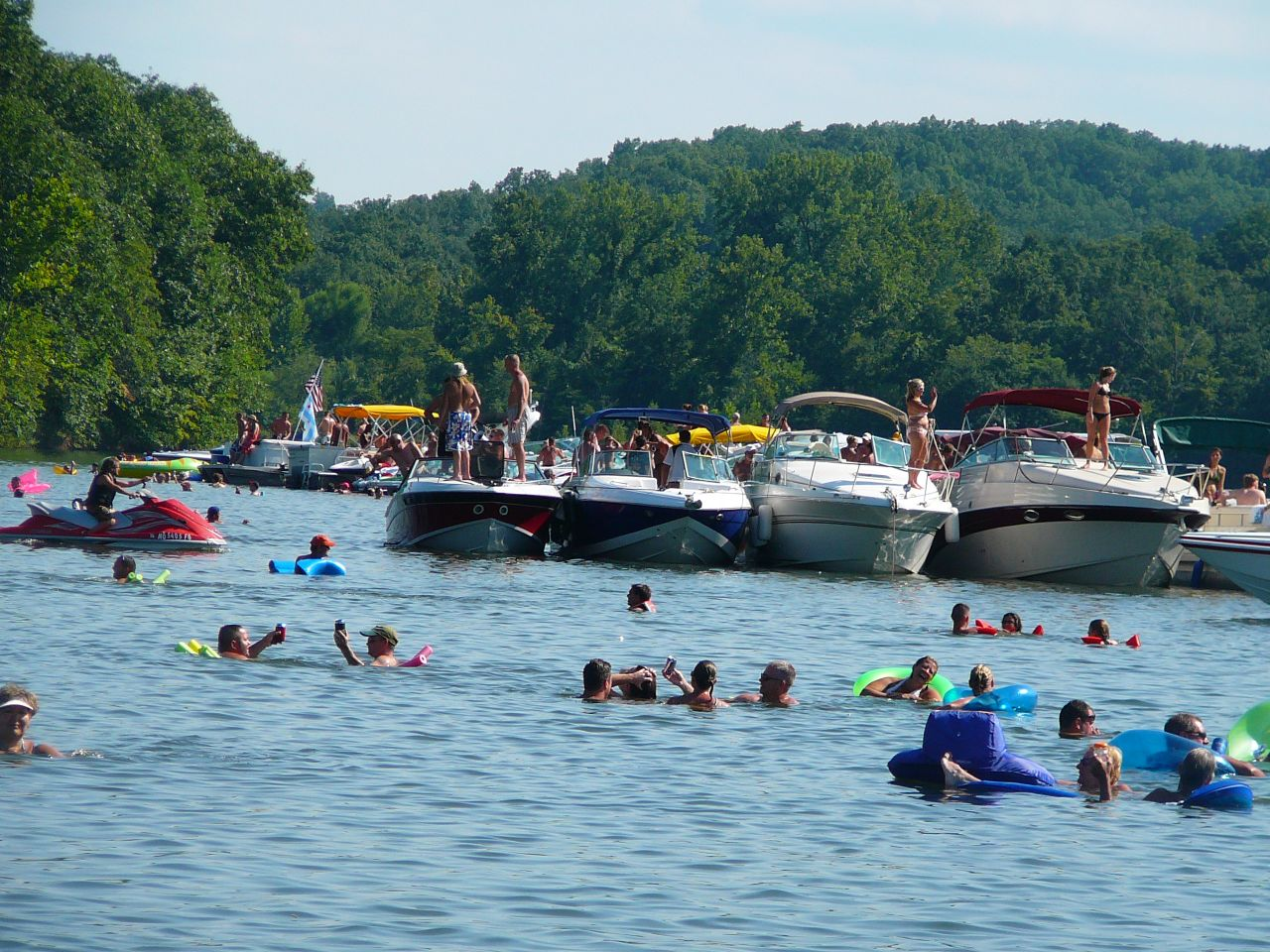
- Party Cove in 2007

- Location within Missouri Location within the United States
- Location: Camden and Miller counties, Missouri, United States
- Nearest city: Osage Beach, Missouri
- Coordinates: 38°06′04″N 92°36′20″W
- Area: 17,666.18 acres (7,149.25 ha)
- Elevation: 663 ft (202.1 m)
- Established: 1946
- Administrator: Missouri Department of Natural Resources
- Visitors: 1,473,192 (in 2023)
- Website: Official website

Lake of the Ozarks State Park is a public recreation area on the Grand Glaize Arm of the Lake of the Ozarks; it is the largest state park in Missouri. (Note: Reported to be the most popular state park in Missouri in 2017, with over 2.5 million visitations, by 2021, Lake of the Ozarks had fallen to third place (1,659,328 visitors) behind Roaring River (1,901,243) and Bennett Spring (1,676,055).) The park includes 85 miles (137 km) of shoreline on the lake (which has a total of 1,150 miles (1,850 km) of shoreline—mostly privately owned); two swimming beaches with imported sand, 12 trails, the Ozark Caverns, a boat launch, and the Lee C. Fine Memorial Airport which has a 6,500-foot (2,000 m) runway. In addition there are campsites and cabins within the park.

One of the most famous aspects of the park is Party Cove which is a rowdy gathering spot that has been featured on the Playboy Channel and the front page of the New York Times Travel Section.

== History ==
The park's initial development began in 1934 with creation of a Recreational Demonstration Area (RDA), one of 46 nationally and three in Missouri established by the National Park Service to convert sub-marginal farm lands to recreational purposes. Missouri's largest RDA, now known as Lake of the Ozarks State Park, was established three years after the impoundment of the Osage River at Bagnell Dam. Three Civilian Conservation Corps (CCC) camps were busy over sixteen camp periods constructing group camps, administrative buildings, roads, a landscaped public beach, and other facilities. In 1946, all RDAs were donated by the federal government to the state park system.

Historic sites

The following CCC-related buildings and national historic districts were individually listed on the National Register of Historic Places in 1985 under their respective NRIS number and are included in the Emergency Conservation Work (E.C.W.) Architecture in Missouri State Parks, 1933–1942, Thematic Resources:

- Barn/Garage in Kaiser Area (NRIS 85000523)
- Camp Clover Point Recreation Hall (NRIS 85000502)
- Camp Hawthorne Central Area District (NRIS 85000526)
- Camp Pin Oak Historic District (NRIS 85001477)
- Camp Rising Sun Recreation Hall (NRIS 85000503)
- Highway 134 Historic District (NRIS 85000533) - This historic district encompasses 17 contributing buildings and 80 contributing structures originally constructed by the Civilian Conservation Corps between 1934 and 1942. They include several notable log structures, including a small shelter at the park entrance, the park office, the old pumphouse, and a rest room in the main picnic area.
- Pin Oak Hollow Bridge (NRIS 85002737)
- Rising Sun Shelter (NRIS 85000524)
- Shelter at McCubbin Point (NRIS 85000525)

View of Lake of the Ozarks State Park from the Rocky Top Trail (view as a 360° interactive panorama)
