= Bagnell Dam =

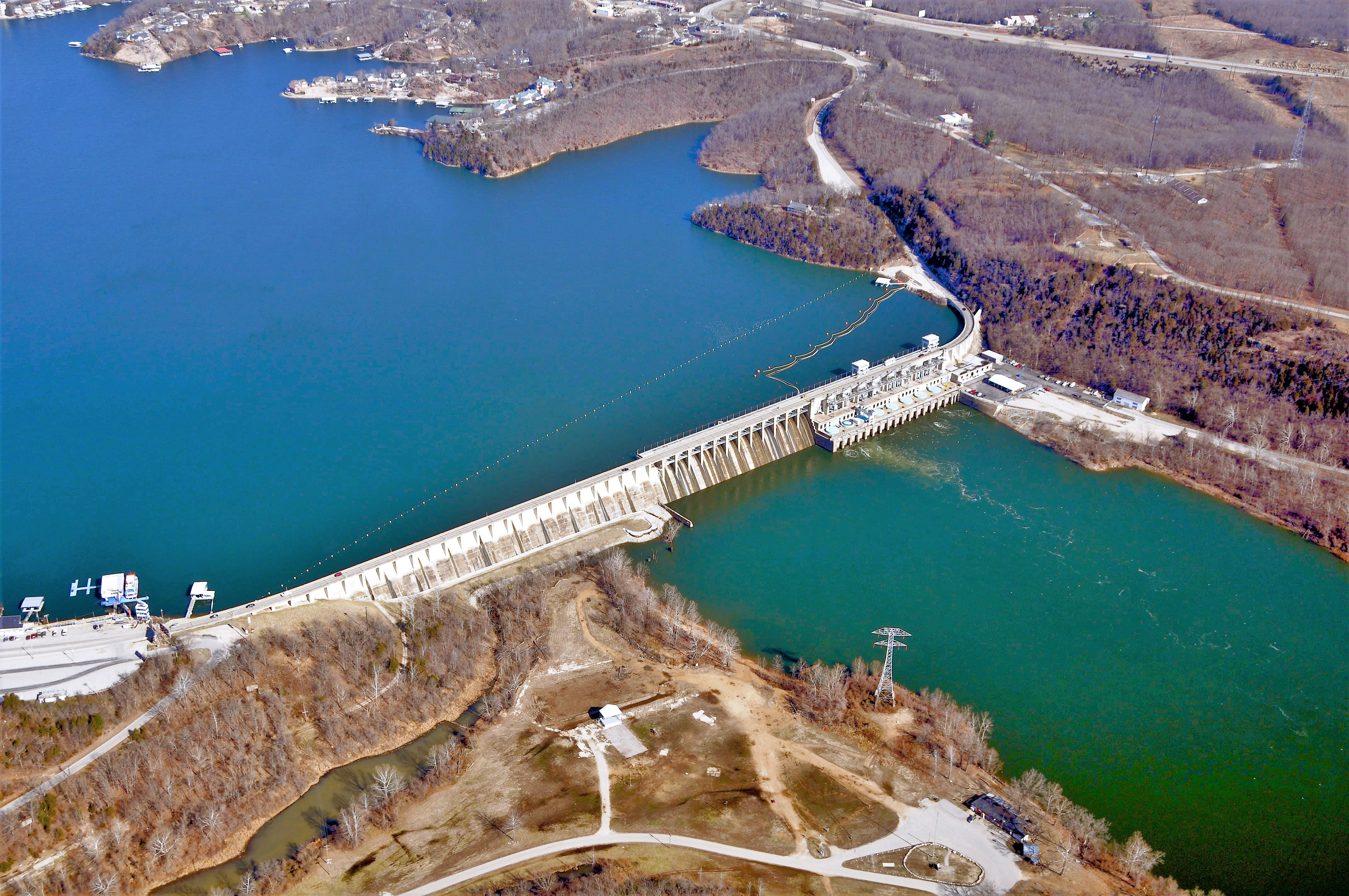
- Bagnell Dam

- Location within Missouri Location within the United States
- Country: United States
- Location: 617 River Road, Lakeside, Missouri
- Coordinates: 38°12′08″N 92°37′37″W
- Purpose: Hydroelectric
- Construction began: 1929; 97 years ago
- Opening date: 1931; 95 years ago
- Owner: Ameren

Dam and spillways
- Type of dam: Concrete gravity
- Impounds: Osage River
- Height (foundation): 148 ft (45 m)
- Length: 2,543 ft (775 m)
- Spillway type: Gated overflow

Reservoir
- Creates: Lake of the Ozarks
- Total capacity: 1,927,000 acre⋅ft (2.377 km^{3})
- Active capacity: 468,000 acre⋅ft (0.577 km^{3})
- Catchment area: 13,944 mi^{2} (36,110 km^{2})
- Surface area: 54,000 acres (22,000 ha)
- Normal elevation: 660 ft (200 m) max

Osage Powerplant
- Type: Conventional
- Hydraulic head: 90 ft (27 m)
- Turbines: Main: 8x 21.5 MW (33,500 HP) Francis; Station service: 2x 2.0 MW (3,025 HP) Francis
- Installed capacity: 176.0 MW; 220 MW (overload)
- Annual generation: 624,000 MWh
- Bagnell Dam and Osage Power Plant
- U.S. National Register of Historic Places
- Area: 6 acres (2.4 ha)
- Architect: Stone & Webster
- Architectural style: Gravity Dam
- NRHP reference No.: 08000822
- Added to NRHP: August 27, 2008

Bagnell Dam (informally, the Osage Dam) impounds the Osage River in the U.S. state of Missouri, creating the Lake of the Ozarks. The dam is located in the city of Lakeside in Miller County, near the Camden-Miller County line. The 148-foot (45 m) tall concrete gravity dam was built by the Union Electric Company (now Ameren) to generate hydroelectric power at its Osage Powerplant. It is 2,543 feet (775 m) long, including a 520-foot (160 m) long spillway and a 511-foot (156 m) long power station. The facility with eight generators has a maximum capacity of 215 megawatts. The dam provides power to 42,000 homes.

The dam also creates Bagnell Dam Boulevard (formerly US 54 prior to 1968, then formally US 54 Business Route), a narrow two-lane highway connecting the nearby Bagnell Dam Strip with Lakeland and U.S. Route 54. The dam is named for the nearby town of Bagnell, Missouri, which was named for William Bagnell, who platted the town in 1883.

== History ==
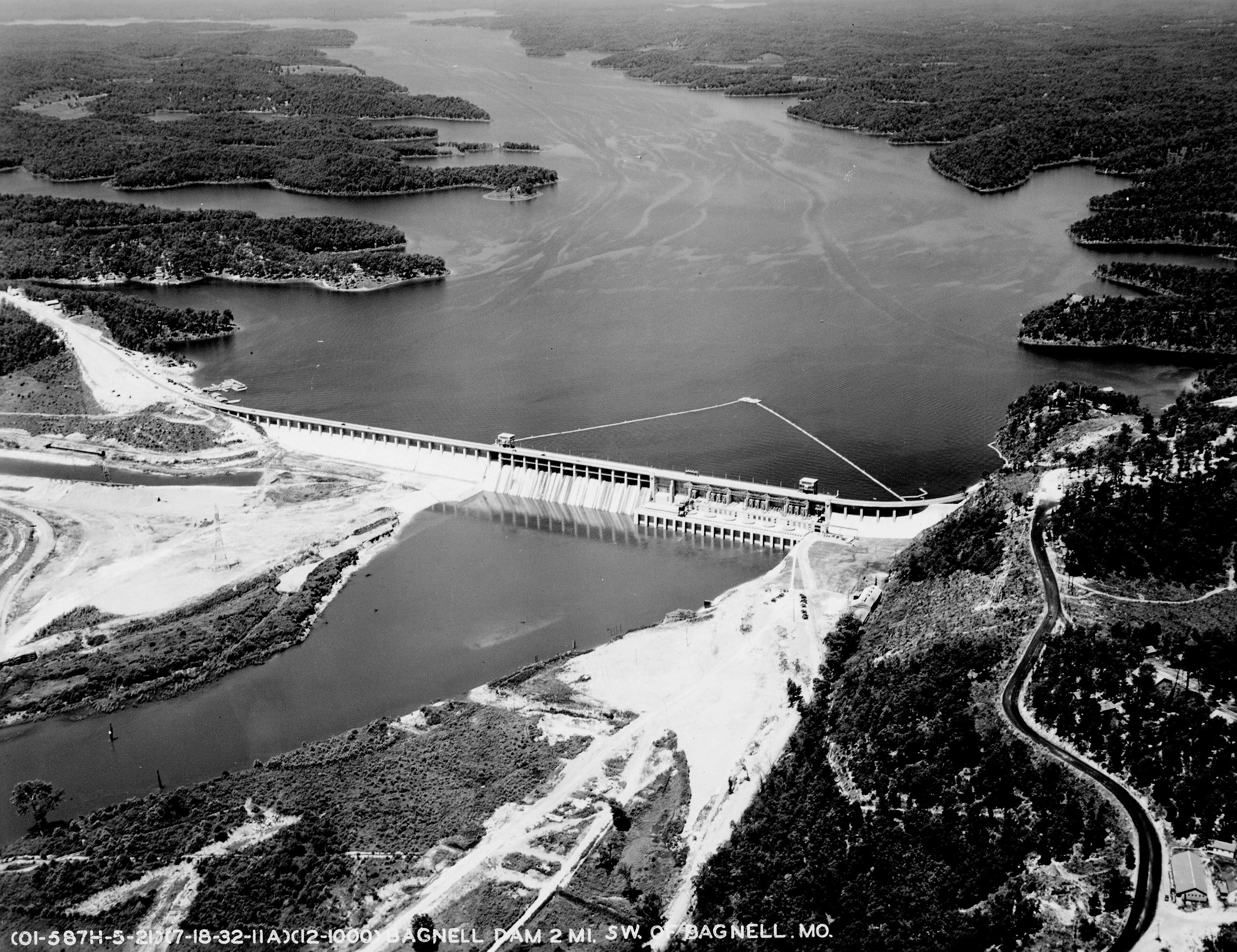
Aerial view, 1932

Construction on the dam started in 1929 and was completed in 1931. The resulting reservoir, the Lake of the Ozarks, has a surface area of 55,000 acres (22,000 ha), over 1,150 miles (1,850 km) of shoreline, and stretches 94 miles (151 km) from end to end. At the time of construction, it was the largest man-made lake in United States and one of the largest in the world. Its construction virtually ended commercial traffic on the upper river.

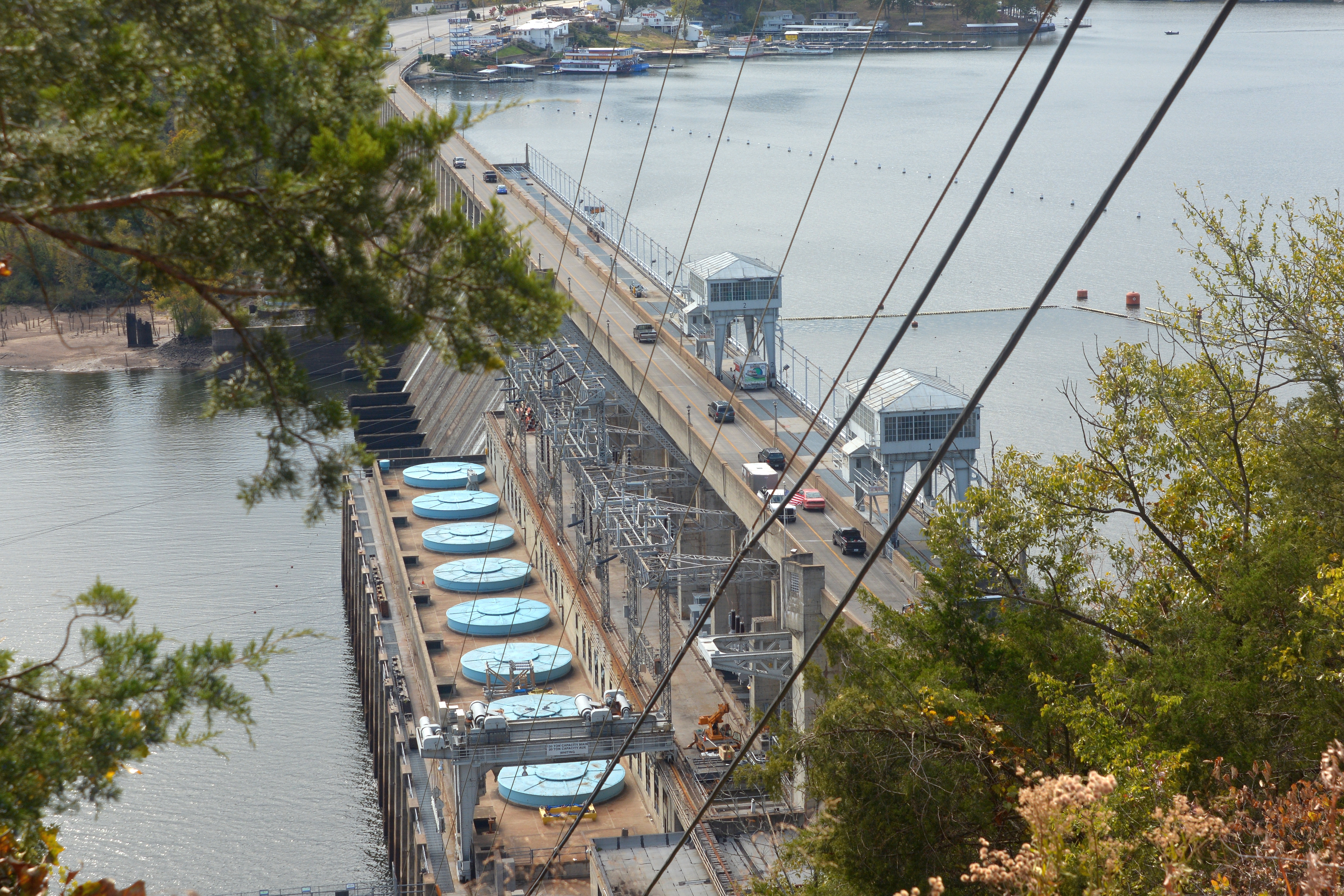
Bagnell Dam

The concept of a hydro-electric power plant on the Osage River was first introduced by a Kansas City developer as early as 1912. Ralph Street managed to put together the funding to construct a dam across the Osage River. He began building roads, railroads, and the support structures necessary to begin construction of a dam that would impound a much smaller lake than what is now known as Lake of the Ozarks. Sometime in the mid-1920s, Street's funding dried up, and he had to abandon the idea of the first hydroelectric power plant on the Osage River.

Union Electric Power and Light stepped in with engineering firm Stone & Webster from Boston, Massachusetts. It designed and constructed Bagnell Dam along the Osage River. Many thought the $30 million project would be a disaster after the stock market crash of 1929, but it was completed. Employment during the lengthy construction proved to be a boost to many families in the area, as well as the hundreds of workers attracted from other areas of the country. The construction of Bagnell Dam was completed and Lake of the Ozarks was a full reservoir in less than two years.

The stock market crash of 1929, which precipitated the Great Depression, occurred just months after construction on Bagnell Dam began. The project employed thousands of laborers, providing a large economic boost to the rural area around the dam and to the state as a whole at a time when jobs were scarce.

In 1940, the Bagnell Ferry that carried traffic over the Osage River before the Bagnell Dam ceased operations after operating since 1882.

The associated Union Electric Administration Building-Lakeside was constructed in 1930. This building was added to the National Register of Historic Places in 1998, with a boundary increase of associated property in 2011.

=== Structural updates ===
In the 1980s, 277 post-tensioned anchors were installed in the dam's structure in order to help hold the monument into the surrounding bedrock. In 2017, a major structural project began to add a new series of anchors and concrete on the downstream side of the dam. Slated to take approximately eighteen months, the project added 66 million pounds of concrete to the dam's structure and cost $52 million. From September 7, 2021 (the day after Labor Day) to April 27, 2022, the bridge went through a rehabilitation project. During construction, the deck was closed to all traffic. Despite this, the road is still narrow. It was supposed to be completed in December 2021 but issues were found during the project. The structure on top was in much poorer condition causing more work to be needed and an 18-ton weight limit was posted once the bridge reopened to traffic. It finally reopened on April 27, 2022.

== Floodgates ==
Construction of the dam allowed for 13 floodgates, as called for in the original design. Only 12 floodgates were installed, and the thirteenth spillway opening is walled shut with concrete. The engineers calculated that 12 floodgates provided a sufficient safety margin.

In response to the 2019 Midwestern U.S. floods, the dam's floodgates were completely open.

== Taum Sauk pumped storage plant ==
Ameren remotely operates the Taum Sauk pumped storage plant from its control room at Bagnell Dam.

== Gallery ==
Images of Bagnell Dam
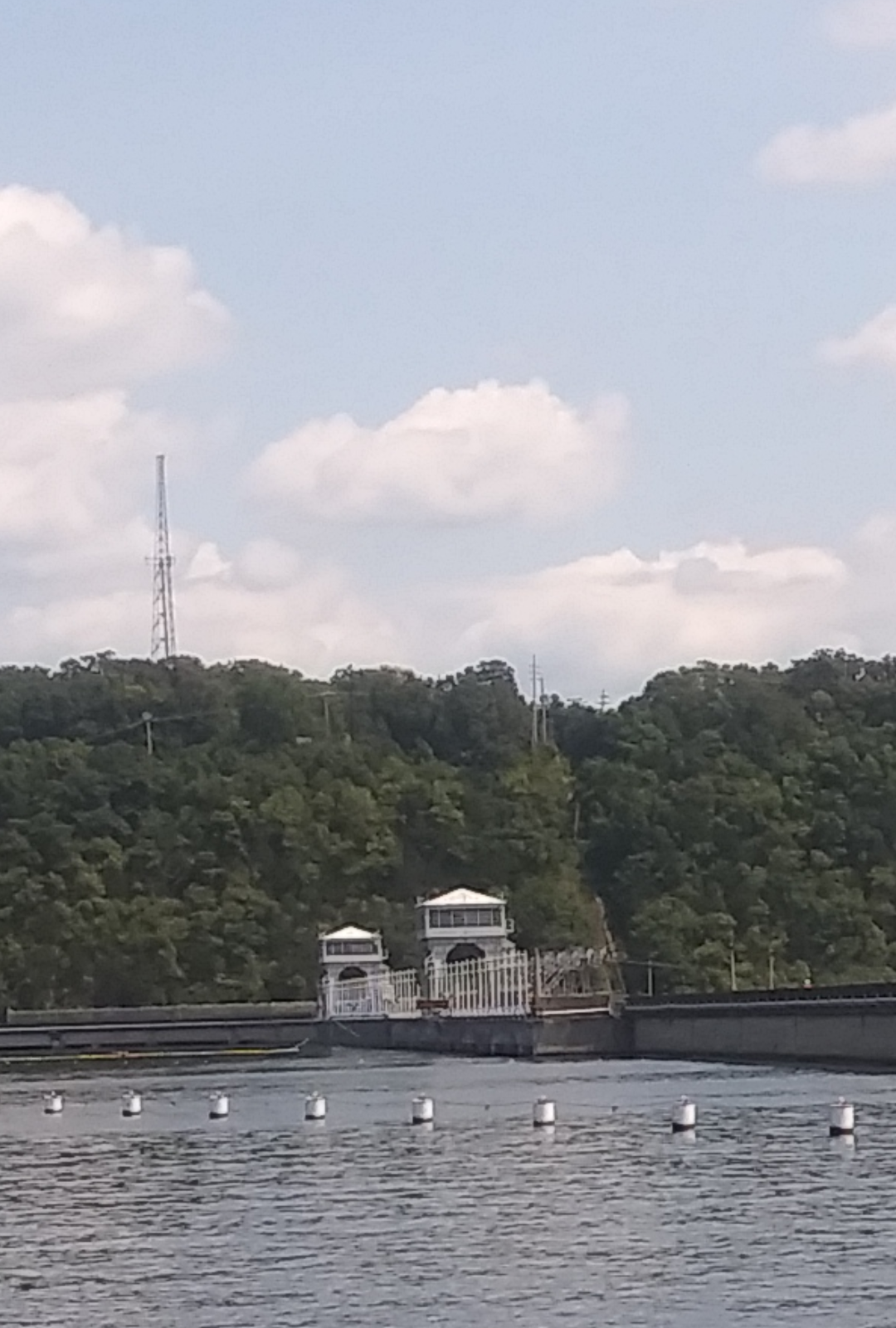
A picture of the dam

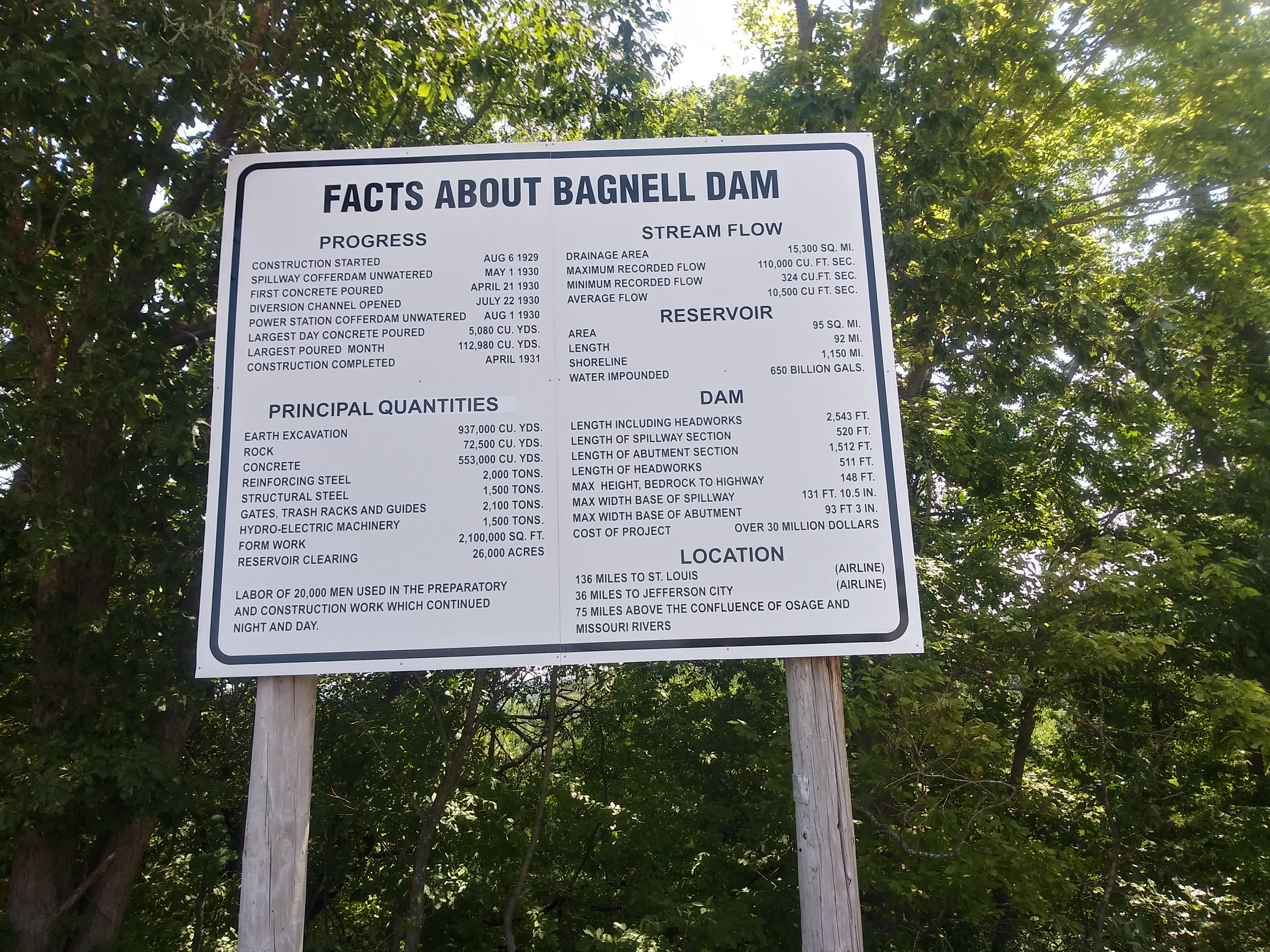
A sign that presents information about the dam and its construction

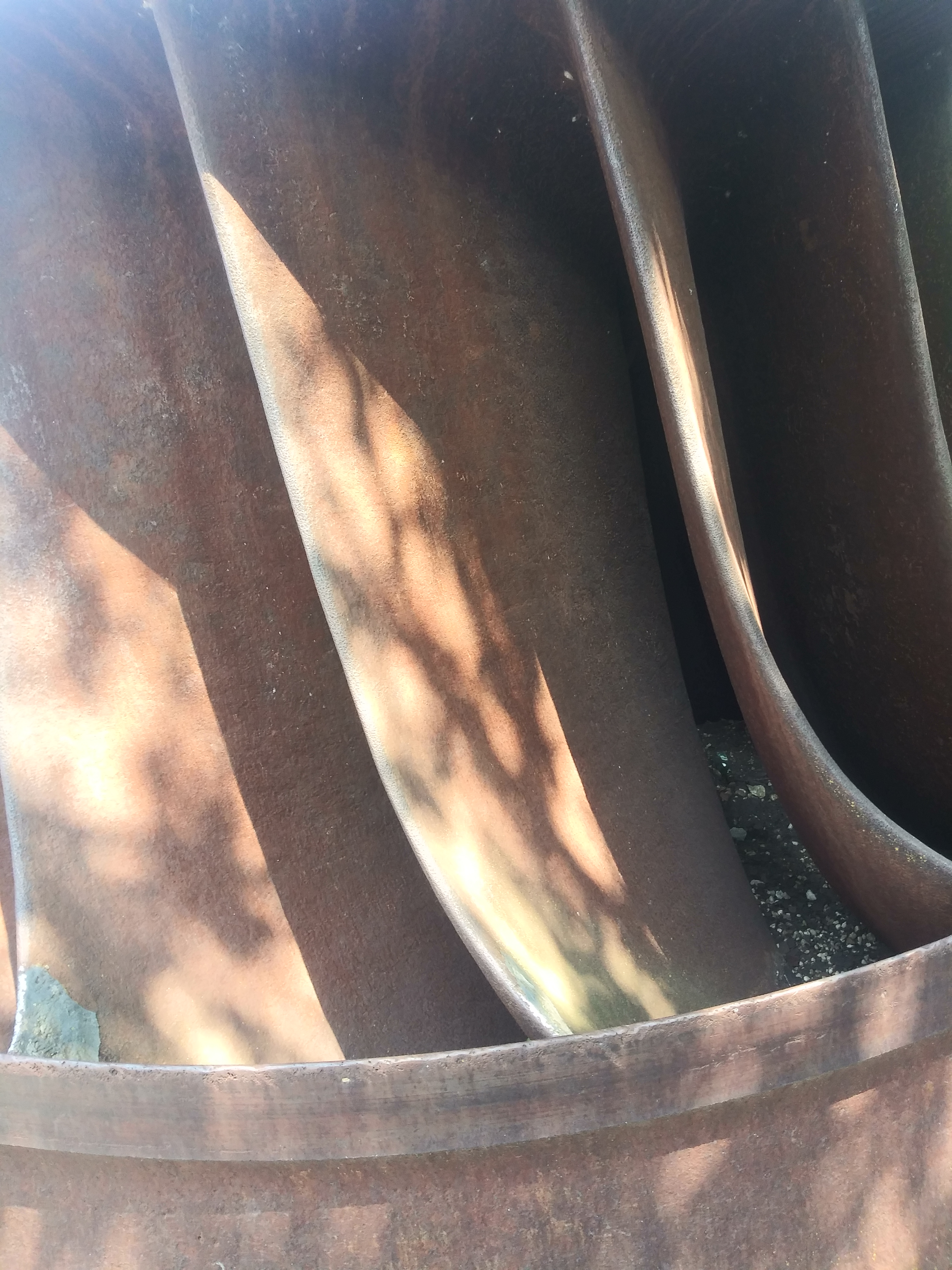
An old turbine that is no longer in use and is now on display
