= Missouri's 4th congressional district =

U.S. House district for Missouri

Coordinates: 38°16′57″N 93°19′08″W

- Interactive map of district boundaries since January 3, 2023
- Representative: Mark Alford; R–Lake Winnebago
- Population (2025): 805,506
- Median household income: $72,740
- Ethnicity: 83.3% White; 5.4% Two or more races; 4.8% Hispanic; 4.3% Black; 1.1% Asian; 1.0% other
- Cook PVI: R+21

Missouri's 4th congressional district comprises west-central Missouri. It stretches from the northern half of Columbia to the southern and eastern suburbs of Kansas City, including a sliver of Kansas City in Cass County and parts of Blue Springs in Jackson County. It also includes the portion of Columbia north of Interstate 70, home to the University of Missouri (but not the university itself).

The district is predominantly rural and relatively conservative; Donald Trump defeated Kamala Harris 71% to 28% in the 2024 election and defeated Joe Biden 69% to 29% in the 2020 election. The district is represented by Republican Mark Alford, a former reporter for WDAF-TV, the city's Fox affiliate.

This district had historically been a Democratic Party stronghold. Antipathy to the Republican Party had its origins in the American Civil War and the infamous General Order 11. The Union Army ordered evacuation of the county in an attempt to reduce support for and the power of bushwhacker guerrillas. After the Civil War, there was disfranchisement of white males (mostly Democrats) who had been active for the Confederacy until they took loyalty oaths, or until 1870. The area was filled with conflict between Missouri's Radicals, who joined the Republicans, and Conservatives, who were Democrats. By 1880 former secessionists dominated Missouri's congressional delegation and state legislature,

Gradually this area developed a character similar to yellow dog Democrat districts in the South. Until 2010, only one Republican had been elected here since the Great Depression, and only for one term. However, several demographic trends have converged to erode the Democratic base in this district. First, as the New York Times election maps show, the predominantly rural counties lining the Missouri River have sharply trended Republican between the 2000 Senate election and the 2006 election, following trends across the South.

Secondly, population losses in Kansas City resulted in the 4th gradually losing much of its share of heavily Democratic Jackson County to the Kansas City-based 5th district. Until 1983, the district stretched as far as Independence on Kansas City's eastern border; as late as 1973 it included the eastern portion of Kansas City itself. To compensate for the loss of territory closer to Kansas City, large portions of heavily Republican Southwest Missouri were reassigned from the neighboring 7th district. The result of these trends resulted in a dramatic collapse of Democratic support in the district. Al Gore, John Kerry, and Barack Obama won less than 40% of the vote here. It ultimately presaged Ike Skelton's defeat by Vicky Hartzler in 2010. Since Skelton's defeat, no Democrat has managed even 40 percent of the vote.

Missouri's 4th congressional district includes all of 20 counties and portions of another 4 counties: Barton, Bates, Benton, Boone (parts), Camden (parts), Cass, Cedar, Dade, Dallas, Henry, Hickory, Howard, Jackson (parts), Johnson, Laclede, Lafayette, Morgan, Pettis, Polk, Pulaski, Saline, St. Clair, Vernon, and Webster (parts).

== Recent election results from statewide races ==
| Year | Office | Results |
|---|---|---|
| 2008 | President | McCain 58% - 40% |
| 2012 | President | Romney 64% - 36% |
| 2012 | Senate | McCaskill 48% - 44% |
| 2012 | Governor | Spence 49% - 48% |
| 2016 | President | Trump 68% - 27% |
| 2016 | Senate | Blunt 58% - 37% |
| 2016 | Governor | Greitens 60% - 37% |
| 2016 | Lt. Governor | Parson 63% - 31% |
| 2016 | Secretary of State | Ashcroft 68% - 27% |
| 2016 | Attorney General | Hawley 67% - 33% |
| 2018 | Senate | Hawley 62% - 34% |
| 2018 | Auditor | McDowell 53% - 41% |
| 2020 | President | Trump 69% - 29% |
| 2020 | Governor | Parson 69% - 29% |
| 2020 | Lt. Governor | Kehoe 70% - 27% |
| 2020 | Secretary of State | Ashcroft 72% - 25% |
| 2020 | Treasurer | Fitzpatrick 70% - 27% |
| 2020 | Attorney General | Schmitt 71% - 26% |
| 2022 | Senate | Schmitt 66% - 31% |
| 2024 | President | Trump 70% - 28% |
| 2024 | Senate | Hawley 67% - 31% |
| 2024 | Governor | Kehoe 70% - 28% |
| 2024 | Lt. Governor | Wasinger 68% - 27% |
| 2024 | Secretary of State | Hoskins 69% - 28% |
| 2024 | Treasurer | Malek 68% - 27% |
| 2024 | Attorney General | Bailey 71% - 26% |

== Composition ==
For the 118th and successive Congresses (based on redistricting following the 2020 census), the district contains all or portions of the following counties, townships, and municipalities:

Barton County (8)

All 8 communities

Bates County (11)

All 11 communities

Benton County (6)

All 6 communities

Boone County (5)

Centralia, Columbia (part; also 3rd), Hallsville, Harrisburg, Sturgeon

Camden County (9)

Camdenton, Climax Springs, Friedenswald, Linn Creek, Macks Creek, Montreal, Osage Beach (part; also 3rd), Stoutland (shared with Laclede County), Sunrise Beach (part; also 3rd)

Cass County (23)

All 23 communities

Cedar County (5)

All 5 communities

Dade County (6)

All 6 communities

Dallas County (4)

All 4 communities

Henry County (11)

All 11 communities

Hickory County (5)

All 5 communities

Howard County (5)

All 5 communities

Jackson County (9)

Blue Springs (part; also 5th), Grain Valley, Independence (part; also 5th and 6th), Lake Lotawana (part; also 5th), Lee's Summit (part; also 5th), Lone Jack, Oak Grove (shared with Lafayette County), Pleasant Hills (shared with Cass County), Tarsney Lakes

Johnson County (9)

All 9 communities

Laclede County (16)

All 16 communities

Lafayette County (17)

All 17 communities

Morgan County (7)

All 7 communities

Pettis County (8)

All 8 communities

Polk County (8)

All 8 communities

Pulaski County (6)

All 6 communities

St. Clair County (7)

All 7 communities

Saline County (12)

All 12 communities

Vernon County (11)

All 11 communities

Webster County (2)

Marshfield, Niangua

== List of members representing the district ==
| Member | Party | Years | Cong ress | Electoral history | District location |
|---|---|---|---|---|---|
District created March 4, 1847
| Willard P. Hall (St. Joseph) | Democratic | March 4, 1847 – March 3, 1853 | 30th 31st 32nd | Elected in 1846. Re-elected in 1848. Re-elected in 1850. Retired. | |
| Mordecai Oliver (Richmond) | Whig | March 4, 1853 – March 3, 1855 | 33rd 34th | Elected in 1852. Re-elected in 1854. Retired. | |
| Mordecai Oliver (Richmond) | Opposition | March 4, 1855 – March 3, 1857 | 33rd 34th | Elected in 1852. Re-elected in 1854. Retired. | |
| James Craig (St. Joseph) | Democratic | March 4, 1857 – March 3, 1861 | 35th 36th | Elected in 1856. Re-elected in 1858. Retired. | |
| Elijah H. Norton (Platte City) | Democratic | March 4, 1861 – March 3, 1863 | 37th | Elected in 1860. Lost re-election. | |
| Sempronius H. Boyd (Springfield) | Unconditional Unionist | March 4, 1863 – March 3, 1865 | 38th | Elected in 1862. Retired. | |
| John R. Kelso (Springfield) | Independent Republican | March 4, 1865 – March 3, 1867 | 39th | Elected in 1864. Retired. | |
| Joseph J. Gravely (Stockton) | Republican | March 4, 1867 – March 3, 1869 | 40th | Elected in 1866. Retired. | |
| Sempronius H. Boyd (Springfield) | Republican | March 4, 1869 – March 3, 1871 | 41st | Elected in 1868. Retired. | |
| Harrison E. Havens (Springfield) | Republican | March 4, 1871 – March 3, 1873 | 42nd | Elected in 1870. Redistricted to the 6th district. | |
| Robert A. Hatcher (Charleston) | Democratic | March 4, 1873 – March 3, 1879 | 43rd 44th 45th | Elected in 1872. Re-elected in 1874. Re-elected in 1876. Retired. | |
| Lowndes H. Davis (Jackson) | Democratic | March 4, 1879 – March 3, 1883 | 46th 47th | Elected in 1878. Re-elected in 1880. Redistricted to the 14th district. | |
| James N. Burnes (St. Joseph) | Democratic | March 4, 1883 – January 23, 1889 | 48th 49th 50th | Elected in 1882. Re-elected in 1884. Re-elected in 1886. Re-elected in 1888 but died before term started. | |
| Vacant | | January 23, 1889 – February 19, 1889 | 50th | | |
| Charles F. Booher (St. Joseph) | Democratic | February 19, 1889 – March 3, 1889 | 50th | Elected to finish Burnes's term in the 50th Congress. Retired. | |
| Vacant | | March 4, 1889 – December 2, 1889 | 51st | | |
| Robert P. C. Wilson (Platte City) | Democratic | December 2, 1889 – March 3, 1893 | 51st 52nd | Elected to finish Burnes's term in the 51st Congress. Re-elected in 1890. Retired. | |
| Daniel D. Burnes (St. Joseph) | Democratic | March 4, 1893 – March 3, 1895 | 53rd | Elected in 1892. Retired. | |
| George C. Crowther (St. Joseph) | Republican | March 4, 1895 – March 3, 1897 | 54th | Elected in 1894. Lost re-election. | |
| Charles F. Cochran (St. Joseph) | Democratic | March 4, 1897 – March 3, 1905 | 55th 56th 57th 58th | Elected in 1896. Re-elected in 1898. Re-elected in 1900. Re-elected in 1902. Withdrew from renomination. | |
| Frank B. Fulkerson (St. Joseph) | Republican | March 4, 1905 – March 3, 1907 | 59th | Elected in 1904. Lost re-election. | |
| Charles F. Booher (Savannah) | Democratic | March 4, 1907 – January 21, 1921 | 60th 61st 62nd 63rd 64th 65th 66th | Elected in 1906. Re-elected in 1908. Re-elected in 1910. Re-elected in 1912. Re-elected in 1914. Re-elected in 1916. Re-elected in 1918. Retired but died before term ended. | |
| Vacant | | January 21, 1921 – March 3, 1921 | 66th | | |
| Charles L. Faust (St. Joseph) | Republican | March 4, 1921 – December 17, 1928 | 67th 68th 69th 70th | Elected in 1920. Re-elected in 1922. Re-elected in 1924. Re-elected in 1926. Re-elected in 1928 but died before term began. | |
| Vacant | | December 17, 1928 – February 5, 1929 | 70th | | |
| David W. Hopkins (St. Joseph) | Republican | February 5, 1929 – March 3, 1933 | 70th 71st 72nd | Elected to finish Faust's term in the 70th Congress. Also elected to start Faust's term in the 71st Congress. Re-elected in 1930. Redistricted to at-large and lost re-election. | |
| District inactive | | March 4, 1933 – January 3, 1935 | 73rd | All representatives elected at-large on a general ticket. | |
| C. Jasper Bell (Blue Springs) | Democratic | January 3, 1935 – January 3, 1949 | 74th 75th 76th 77th 78th 79th 80th | Elected in 1934. Re-elected in 1936. Re-elected in 1938. Re-elected in 1940. Re-elected in 1942. Re-elected in 1944. Re-elected in 1946. Retired. | |
| Leonard Irving (Independence) | Democratic | January 3, 1949 – January 3, 1953 | 81st 82nd | Elected in 1948. Re-elected in 1950. Lost re-election. | |
| Jeffrey P. Hillelson (Independence) | Republican | January 3, 1953 – January 3, 1955 | 83rd | Elected in 1952. Lost re-election. | 1953–1963 [data missing] |
| George H. Christopher (Butler) | Democratic | January 3, 1955 – January 23, 1959 | 84th 85th 86th | Elected in 1954. Re-elected in 1956. Re-elected in 1958. Died. | 1953–1963 [data missing] |
| Vacant | | January 23, 1959 – March 3, 1959 | 86th | | 1953–1963 [data missing] |
| William J. Randall (Independence) | Democratic | March 3, 1959 – January 3, 1977 | 86th 87th 88th 89th 90th 91st 92nd 93rd 94th | Elected to finish Christopher's term. Re-elected in 1960. Re-elected in 1962. Re-elected in 1964. Re-elected in 1966. Re-elected in 1968. Re-elected in 1970. Re-elected in 1972. Re-elected in 1974. Retired. | 1953–1963 [data missing] |
| William J. Randall (Independence) | Democratic | March 3, 1959 – January 3, 1977 | 86th 87th 88th 89th 90th 91st 92nd 93rd 94th | Elected to finish Christopher's term. Re-elected in 1960. Re-elected in 1962. Re-elected in 1964. Re-elected in 1966. Re-elected in 1968. Re-elected in 1970. Re-elected in 1972. Re-elected in 1974. Retired. | 1963–1973 [data missing] |
| William J. Randall (Independence) | Democratic | March 3, 1959 – January 3, 1977 | 86th 87th 88th 89th 90th 91st 92nd 93rd 94th | Elected to finish Christopher's term. Re-elected in 1960. Re-elected in 1962. Re-elected in 1964. Re-elected in 1966. Re-elected in 1968. Re-elected in 1970. Re-elected in 1972. Re-elected in 1974. Retired. | 1973–1983 [data missing] |
| Ike Skelton (Lexington) | Democratic | January 3, 1977 – January 3, 2011 | 95th 96th 97th 98th 99th 100th 101st 102nd 103rd 104th 105th 106th 107th 108th 109th 110th 111th | Elected in 1976. Re-elected in 1978. Re-elected in 1980. Re-elected in 1982. Re-elected in 1984. Re-elected in 1986. Re-elected in 1988. Re-elected in 1990. Re-elected in 1992. Re-elected in 1994. Re-elected in 1996. Re-elected in 1998. Re-elected in 2000. Re-elected in 2002. Re-elected in 2004. Re-elected in 2006. Re-elected in 2008. Lost re-election. | 1973–1983 [data missing] |
| Ike Skelton (Lexington) | Democratic | January 3, 1977 – January 3, 2011 | 95th 96th 97th 98th 99th 100th 101st 102nd 103rd 104th 105th 106th 107th 108th 109th 110th 111th | Elected in 1976. Re-elected in 1978. Re-elected in 1980. Re-elected in 1982. Re-elected in 1984. Re-elected in 1986. Re-elected in 1988. Re-elected in 1990. Re-elected in 1992. Re-elected in 1994. Re-elected in 1996. Re-elected in 1998. Re-elected in 2000. Re-elected in 2002. Re-elected in 2004. Re-elected in 2006. Re-elected in 2008. Lost re-election. | 1983–1993 [data missing] |
| Ike Skelton (Lexington) | Democratic | January 3, 1977 – January 3, 2011 | 95th 96th 97th 98th 99th 100th 101st 102nd 103rd 104th 105th 106th 107th 108th 109th 110th 111th | Elected in 1976. Re-elected in 1978. Re-elected in 1980. Re-elected in 1982. Re-elected in 1984. Re-elected in 1986. Re-elected in 1988. Re-elected in 1990. Re-elected in 1992. Re-elected in 1994. Re-elected in 1996. Re-elected in 1998. Re-elected in 2000. Re-elected in 2002. Re-elected in 2004. Re-elected in 2006. Re-elected in 2008. Lost re-election. | 1993–2003 [data missing] |
| Ike Skelton (Lexington) | Democratic | January 3, 1977 – January 3, 2011 | 95th 96th 97th 98th 99th 100th 101st 102nd 103rd 104th 105th 106th 107th 108th 109th 110th 111th | Elected in 1976. Re-elected in 1978. Re-elected in 1980. Re-elected in 1982. Re-elected in 1984. Re-elected in 1986. Re-elected in 1988. Re-elected in 1990. Re-elected in 1992. Re-elected in 1994. Re-elected in 1996. Re-elected in 1998. Re-elected in 2000. Re-elected in 2002. Re-elected in 2004. Re-elected in 2006. Re-elected in 2008. Lost re-election. | 2003–2013 |
| Vicky Hartzler (Harrisonville) | Republican | January 3, 2011 – January 3, 2023 | 112th 113th 114th 115th 116th 117th | Elected in 2010. Re-elected in 2012. Re-elected in 2014. Re-elected in 2016. Re-elected in 2018. Re-elected in 2020. Retired to run for U.S. senator. | 2003–2013 |
| Vicky Hartzler (Harrisonville) | Republican | January 3, 2011 – January 3, 2023 | 112th 113th 114th 115th 116th 117th | Elected in 2010. Re-elected in 2012. Re-elected in 2014. Re-elected in 2016. Re-elected in 2018. Re-elected in 2020. Retired to run for U.S. senator. | 2013–2023 |
| Mark Alford (Lake Winnebago) | Republican | January 3, 2023 – present | 118th 119th | Elected in 2022. Re-elected in 2024. Re-elected in 2026. | 2023–present |

== Election results ==
=== 2010 ===
Missouri's 4th district general election, November 2, 2010
| Party | Candidate | Votes | % |
|---|---|---|---|
| Republican | Vicky Hartzler | 113,489 | 50.43% |
| Democratic | Ike Skelton (incumbent) | 101,532 | 45.11% |
| Libertarian | Jason Michael Braun | 6,123 | 2.72% |
| Constitution | Greg Cowan | 3,912 | 1.74% |
| Total votes | | 225,056 | 100.00% |

=== 2012 ===
Missouri 4th Congressional District 2012
| Party | Candidate | Votes | % |
|---|---|---|---|
| Republican | Vicky Hartzler (incumbent) | 192,237 | 60.3% |
| Democratic | Teresa Hensley | 113,120 | 35.5% |
| Libertarian | Bill Slantz | 10,407 | 3.3% |
| Constitution | Greg Cowan | 2,959 | 0.5% |
| Total votes | | 318,723 | 100.0% |

=== 2014 ===
Missouri's 4th Congressional District, 2014
| Party | Candidate | Votes | % |
|---|---|---|---|
| Republican | Vicky Hartzler (incumbent) | 120,014 | 68.08% |
| Democratic | Nate Irvin | 46,464 | 26.36% |
| Libertarian | Herschel L. Young | 9,793 | 5.56% |
| Write-In | Gregory A Cowan | 15 | 0.01% |
| Total votes | | 176,286 | 100% |
| Republican hold | | | |

=== 2016 ===
Missouri's 4th congressional district election, 2016
| Party | Candidate | Votes | % |
|---|---|---|---|
| Republican | Vicky Hartzler (incumbent) | 225,348 | 67.83% |
| Democratic | Gordon Christensen | 92,510 | 27.85% |
| Libertarian | Mark Bliss | 14,376 | 4.33% |
| Total votes | | 332,234 | 100% |
| Republican hold | | | |

=== 2018 ===
Missouri's 4th congressional district election, 2018
| Party | Candidate | Votes | % |
|---|---|---|---|
| Republican | Vicky Hartzler (incumbent) | 190,138 | 64.8% |
| Democratic | Renee Hoagenson | 95,968 | 32.7% |
| Libertarian | Mark Bliss | 7,210 | 2.5% |
| Total votes | | 293,316 | 100% |
| Republican hold | | | |

=== 2020 ===
Missouri's 4th congressional district, 2020
| Party | Candidate | Votes | % |
|---|---|---|---|
| Republican | Vicky Hartzler (incumbent) | 245,247 | 67.6 |
| Democratic | Lindsey Simmons | 107,635 | 29.7 |
| Libertarian | Steven K. Koonse | 9,954 | 2.7 |
| Total votes | | 362,836 | 100.0 |
| Republican hold | | | |

=== 2022 ===
Missouri's 4th congressional district, 2022
| Party | Candidate | Votes | % |
|---|---|---|---|
| Republican | Mark Alford | 181,890 | 71.3 |
| Democratic | Jack Truman | 67,069 | 26.3 |
| Libertarian | Randy Langkraehr | 6,117 | 2.4 |
| Write-in | | 3 | 0.0 |
| Total votes | | 255,079 | 100.0 |
| Republican hold | | | |

=== 2024 ===
Missouri's 4th congressional district election, 2024
| Party | Candidate | Votes | % |
|---|---|---|---|
| Republican | Mark Alford (incumbent) | 259,886 | 71.1 |
| Democratic | Jeanette Cass | 96,568 | 26.4 |
| Libertarian | Thomas Holbrook | 9,240 | 2.5 |
| Write-in | | 2 | 0.0 |
| Total votes | | 365,696 | 100.0 |
| Republican hold | | | |

=== Prior results ===
==== 2008 Presidential Election Results ====
The table below shows how individual counties in MO-04 voted in the 2008 presidential election. U.S. Senator John McCain (R-Arizona) won every single county in MO-04 and swept the district with 60.58 percent of the vote while U.S. Senator Barack Obama (D-Illinois) received 37.87 percent, a 22.71-percent margin of victory for the GOP.

| County | John McCain | Barack Obama | Difference |
|---|---|---|---|
| Barton | 74.21 | 24.46 | R + 49.75 |
| Dade | 69.65 | 28.79 | R + 40.86 |
| Moniteau | 67.02 | 31.27 | R + 35.75 |
| Laclede | 66.62 | 31.97 | R + 34.65 |
| Cedar | 66.01 | 32.42 | R + 33.59 |
| Polk | 65.39 | 33.24 | R + 32.15 |
| Dallas | 63.71 | 34.57 | R + 29.14 |
| Webster | 63.77 | 34.76 | R + 29.01 |
| Pulaski | 63.68 | 34.99 | R + 28.69 |
| Camden | 63.59 | 35.12 | R + 28.47 |
| Cole | 62.94 | 36.03 | R + 26.91 |
| Pettis | 60.51 | 38.07 | R + 22.44 |
| Benton | 60.20 | 37.93 | R + 22.27 |
| Vernon | 60.08 | 38.08 | R + 22.00 |
| St. Clair | 59.76 | 37.81 | R + 21.95 |
| Morgan | 59.58 | 38.97 | R + 20.61 |
| Cass | 59.18 | 39.55 | R + 19.63 |
| Bates | 58.35 | 39.49 | R + 18.86 |
| Lafayette | 56.88 | 41.58 | R + 15.30 |
| Hickory | 55.72 | 42.44 | R + 13.28 |
| Johnson | 55.18 | 42.93 | R + 12.25 |
| Henry | 54.62 | 43.63 | R + 10.99 |
| Ray | 50.60 | 47.42 | R + 3.18 |
| Saline | 50.39 | 47.85 | R + 2.54 |

==== 2008 Missouri Democratic Presidential Primary Election Results ====
The table below shows how individual counties in MO-04 voted in the 2008 Missouri Democratic Presidential Primary. Former U.S. Senator Hillary Rodham Clinton (D-New York) swept the district by a convincing margin over U.S. Senator Barack Obama (D-Illinois). Clinton won every county in the district with the exception of Cole County, home of the State Capitol.

| County | Hillary Clinton | Barack Obama | Difference |
|---|---|---|---|
| Benton | 68.77 | 26.95 | C + 41.82 |
| St. Clair | 67.52 | 26.12 | C + 41.40 |
| Hickory | 67.95 | 27.86 | C + 40.09 |
| Ray | 65.29 | 30.31 | C + 34.98 |
| Bates | 63.51 | 30.08 | C + 33.43 |
| Dallas | 63.75 | 32.01 | C + 31.74 |
| Henry | 63.18 | 32.10 | C + 31.08 |
| Barton | 63.43 | 32.85 | C + 30.58 |
| Polk | 63.81 | 33.28 | C + 30.53 |
| Vernon | 61.55 | 31.42 | C + 30.13 |
| Dade | 62.22 | 33.12 | C + 29.10 |
| Laclede | 62.48 | 33.77 | C + 28.71 |
| Morgan | 62.05 | 33.58 | C + 28.47 |
| Cedar | 60.30 | 33.00 | C + 27.30 |
| Webster | 61.20 | 34.46 | C + 26.74 |
| Lafayette | 60.75 | 35.40 | C + 25.35 |
| Moniteau | 60.38 | 36.38 | C + 24.00 |
| Cass | 59.76 | 36.73 | C + 23.03 |
| Saline | 57.46 | 37.85 | C + 19.61 |
| Camden | 57.99 | 38.75 | C + 19.24 |
| Pulaski | 56.07 | 39.35 | C + 16.72 |
| Pettis | 54.76 | 41.38 | C + 13.38 |
| Johnson | 53.22 | 43.07 | C + 10.15 |
| Cole | 45.07 | 51.16 | O + 6.09 |

== See also ==
- Missouri's congressional districts
- List of United States congressional districts
