= Adair Township, Camden County, Missouri =

Inactive township in the US state of Missouri

Adair Township
- Township
- Coordinates: 38°06′34″N 092°52′31″W
- Country: United States
- State: Missouri
- County: Camden

Area
  - Total: 106.93 sq mi (276.96 km^{2})
  - Land: 98.44 sq mi (254.96 km^{2})
  - Water: 8.5 sq mi (22 km^{2}) 7.94%
- Elevation: 869 ft (265 m)

Population (2010)
  - Total: 5,062
  - Density: 47/sq mi (18.3/km^{2})
- FIPS code: 29-00190
- GNIS feature ID: 0766388

Adair Township is one of eleven townships in Camden County, Missouri, US. At the 2010 census, its population was 5,062.

Adair Township was erected in 1841.

== Geography ==
Adair Township covers an area of 106.93 square miles (276.9 km^{2}) and contains one incorporated settlement, Climax Springs. It contains nine cemeteries: Adkins, Barnumton, Cable Ridge, Clark, Dority, Granger, Parish, Whitaker and Woolery.

The streams of Bollinger Creek, Dry Branch, Fiery Fork, Jack Branch, Kolb Branch, Lick Creek, Morriss Creek, Pearson Branch, Rainy Creek, Rise Branch, Ritter Branch, Spring Valley Creek and West Pearson Branch run through this township, and it contains multiple smaller springs.

== Public areas ==
Adair Township contains the Moles Cave State Wildlife Area and Fiery Fork State Wildlife Area, which has canoe access to the Little Niangua River. It also contains the Climax Springs Lookout Tower.

== Transportation ==
Adair Township contains one airport or landing strip, Eagles Landing Airport. It also contains Missouri Route 7, and Missouri Supplemental Routes CC, DD, J, NN, and Z.
