= Russell Township, Camden County, Missouri =

Township in the US state of Missouri

Russell Township
- Township
- Coordinates: 37°59′30″N 092°56′57″W
- Country: United States
- State: Missouri
- County: Camden

Area
  - Total: 142.83 sq mi (369.92 km^{2})
  - Land: 141.21 sq mi (365.73 km^{2})
  - Water: 1.62 sq mi (4.19 km^{2}) 1.13%
- Elevation: 1,099 ft (335 m)

Population (2000)
  - Total: 2,495
  - Density: 18/sq mi (6.8/km^{2})
- FIPS code: 29-63668
- GNIS feature ID: 0766393

Russell Township is one of eleven townships in Camden County, Missouri, USA. As of the 2000 census, its population was 2,495.

Russell Township was established in 1841 in the southwest part of Camden County.

It is bordered on the north by Adair Township and the Little Niangua River, on the east by Warren and Osage Townships, on the south by Dallas County, and on the west by Hickory County. As one of the six original townships created by the county court in March 1841, the township was probably named for a prominent landowner, William Russell, who was one of the first judges of election there. It may have been named for General William Russell of the Revolutionary War.

== Geography ==
Russell Township covers an area of 142.83 square miles (369.9 km^{2}) and contains one incorporated settlement, Macks Creek. It contains several unincorporated historic communities, some of which contain post offices, including Banister, Branch, Dry Ridge, Edith, Only, Prairie Hollow and Roach. The Township contains at least ten cemeteries: Creach, Edwards, Green, Hurst, Mills, Pleasant Grove, Raggs, Stanton, Warren and Wiley Gott.

The streams of A B Creek, Broadus Branch, Brush Creek, Jacks Creek, Kolb Branch, Little Brush Creek, Little Niangua River, Long Branch, Macks Creek, Mire Hollow Creek, Pennel Branch, Phillips Branch, Watson Branch and Woodall Branch as well as the geographical feature the Niangua Hills run through this township.

== Public Areas ==
Public Areas include:

- Cedar Camp which contains rental cabins, a park, a campground, and a Little Niangua canoe access.
- Bannister Ford which contains a bridge where Route CC crosses the Little Niangua River and a canoe access.
- Fiery Fork Conservation Area
