= Edith, Missouri =

Unincorporated community in Missouri, U.S.

Edith
- Unincorporated community
- Location of Edith in Missouri
- Coordinates: 37°56′47.7″N 92°52′29.6″W
- Country: United States
- State: Missouri
- County: Camden
- Named after: Edyth King Roach family

Edith is an unincorporated community in Russell Township in southern Camden County, Missouri, United States, known also as Green Gables. It is located on State Road U three miles south of U.S. Route 54, and about seven miles east of Macks Creek and 12 miles west of Camdenton.

There was a post office here between 1894 and 1918. Edith was a resort community based around recreational access to the Niangua River and the Green Gables Lodge in the 1940s.

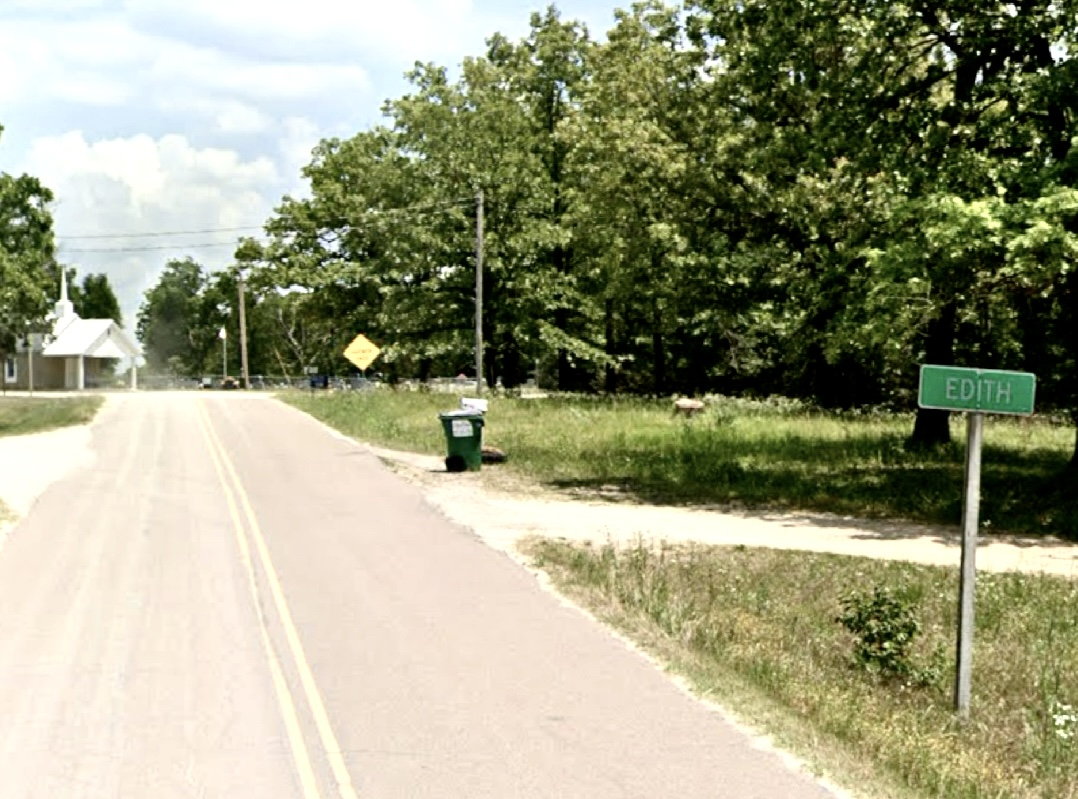
Edith, Missouri, site of the Pleasant Grove Church and Green Gables Lodge

The Pleasant Grove School was located here, and a natural stone schoolhouse that was rebuilt in 2006 operated between 1938 and 1946. The Pleasant Grove Cemetery and the Pleasant Grove Missionary Baptist Church, founded in 1868, remain here.

== History ==
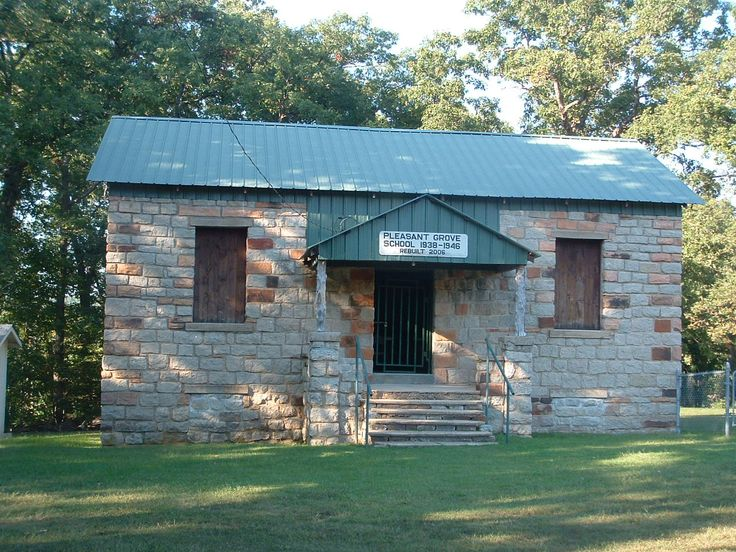
Pleasant Grove School at Edith, Missouri

Edith was likely named for Edyth King Roach (1878–1955), the wife of U.S. Representative and Lawyer Sidney C. Roach (1876–1934) for whose father, Littleberry "Jack" Roach, nearby Roach, Missouri, was named. The Roach family migrated here from Tennessee in 1831.

Depicted on maps as Edith and as "Pleasant Grove," it was a summer resort that "assumed the more glamorous name of Green Gables, probably inspired by Lucy Maud Montgomery's popular romance, Anne of Green Gables, first published in 1908. The summer homes there are said all to have painted their gables green," according to a history.

=== Green Gables Lodge ===
In 1926, the year an illustrated edition of the novel Anne of Green Gables was released, the Green Gables Lodge was erected at Edith. Eventually there was a 3,192-square-foot dormitory building for 12 people, a 2,500-square-foot lodge building, a 4-acre lake, basketball courts, a climbing wall and 375 feet of frontage on the Niangua River.

Between about 1988 and 2016, Green Gables Lodge was a residential treatment facility, oftentimes with an adventure-based counseling model. It consisted of "160 acres of woods, pasture, and a spring fed lake situated along the Niangua River." There was a library, three restrooms, administrative offices. The dormitory featured a sleeping area, dining room, kitchen, pantries, dayroom, two restrooms, showers and laundry. There was also a maintenance building and "five storage buildings containing surplus supplies, camping equipment and yard tools."

In 2015, treatment here included "individualized, group, educational, medical, and psychosocial, and other needs and topics specialized and individualized to meet the needs of each resident in the care of the facility." Treatment focused on "Adventure Based Counseling" with "fishing, running, canoeing, backpacking, basecamping, and Ropes Courses."

== Geography ==
Edith is near the western banks of the winding Niangua River, about four linear miles southwest of Roach and five miles east of Macks Creek, the largest settlement in Russell Township.

It is one-half mile north of the Whistle Bridge, a concrete causeway at the end of Tunnel Dam Road that crosses the Big Niangua River downstream from the dam.

Edith is nearly two miles northwest of White City, a former community built on the rocky ridge to house the workers who erected the Tunnel Dam on the Niangua River beginning in about 1922.

Edith is about one and one-half linear miles north of Chapel Bluff, the site of notable limestone rock formations located along the Niangua River, south of the confluence of Jacks Creek with Mire Hollow Creek. It is the site of the former Chapel Bluff School, where, in the 1926–27 school year, Roy Tipton was the teacher, W. A. Vance was president and the clerk was John Varner.

Chapel Bluff is about three and one-half linear miles north of the village of Celt, an unincorporated community in northeastern Dallas County.

Chapel Bluff is about three and one-half linear miles to the east of Only, Missouri, which was the name of a populated place, with a post office between 1907 and 1919, in Russell Township. Only is on State Road O, off of Chapel Bluff Road as it emerges from the Niangua Hills. Only is to the immediate south of the historical village known as Dry Ridge where a school remained into the late 1920s. Another now extinct village by the same name was on the eastern side of the Niangua.

The Wiley Gott Cemetery, established 1868, and the Mills Cemetery, established 1888, are south of Edith, are the southernmost burial sites in Camden County.
