= Camdenton R-III School District =

School district in Missouri, U.S.

Address
- 172 Dare Blvd Camdenton, Missouri, 65020; United States

District information
- Type: Public School District
- Motto: Everyone Learning Every Day
- Grades: PreK-12
- Established: 1931; 95 years ago
- President: Troy Risner
- Vice-president: Callie Henze
- Superintendent: Brett Thompson
- Asst. superintendent(s): Todd Shockley, Keith White
- Schools: 9

Students and staff
- Students: 3,843
- Teachers: 318
- Student–teacher ratio: 1:12
- Athletic conference: CMAC
- District mascot: Lakers
- Colors: Purple and gold

Other information
- Website: camdentonschools.org

The Camdenton R-III School District, also known as the Camdenton School District or simply Camdenton Schools, is a public school district based in Camdenton, Missouri. The district serves the city of Camdenton as well as Linn Creek, Sunrise Beach, parts of Osage Beach, and several unincorporated communities including Greenview, Hurricane Deck, Montreal, and Roach.

== Schools ==
Dogwood Elementary School – Grades K-2

Hawthorn Elementary School – Grades 3–4

Osage Beach Elementary School – Grades K–4

Hurricane Deck Elementary School – Grades K–4

Oak Ridge Intermediate School – Grades 5–6

Camdenton Middle School – Grades 7–8

Camdenton High School – Grades 9–12

Lake Career and Technical Center – Grades K-12 (Engineering and trade classes)

Horizons Educational Center – Grades 9–12 (Alternative learning)

== History ==
The district was established in 1931, with the only building being what is now Dogwood Elementary School. The school was formed by consolidating the existing schools of New Home, Ha Ha Tonka, Decaturville, Drake, Myetta, and Forest Gove. In 1951, Montreal C-1, Freedom No. 41, Lone Star No. 62 and Snyder No. 42 voted to annex to Camdenton-RIII. In 1953, the Hurricane Deck building was constructed. A new elementary building and a football field were built in 1958. A new high school was built in 1965. In 1969, a new middle school was built on the location of the former football field, with a new football field being built behind it. In 1979, the Lake Career and Technical Center was built. In 2007, following the construction of a new high school, the district was reorganized. The former upper elementary building became Oak Ridge Intermediate School, the former middle school became Hawthorn Elementary School, and the former high school became the middle school.

== Programs ==
=== Band ===
The Camdenton band program is among the top in the state of Missouri. It was founded in 1936 and has had several directors, such as Bob Rippee, Paul Baur, and its current director, Dominic Zanaboni. In 2018, the band placed 33rd overall at the Bands of America Grand National Championships. In 2019, the band placed 1st in class AA and 10th overall at the Bands of America St. Louis Super Regional. In 2021, they won the Bands of America Cedar Falls Regional.

== Notable alumni ==
Jason Whittle (NFL Player)
