= Green Bay Terrace, Missouri =

Unincorporated community in Missouri, U.S.

Green Bay Terrace
- Unincorporated community
- Location of Green Bay Terrace in Missouri
- Coordinates: 38°05′34″N 92°45′43″W
- Country: United States
- State: Missouri
- County: Camden
- Named for: Green Bay, Wisconsin

Green Bay Terrace is an unincorporated community in Camden County, in the U.S. state of Missouri.

The community is on the north shore of the Lake of the Ozarks on Missouri Route F 5.5 miles south of Sunrise Beach. Camdenton is approximately 5.5 miles south.

The community most likely derives its name from Green Bay, Wisconsin.
