= Bannister, Missouri =

Unincorporated community in Missouri, U.S.

Bannister
- Unincorporated community
- Bannister's position in Missouri
- Coordinates: 38°02′06″N 92°59′18″W
- Country: United States
- State: Missouri
- County: Camden
- Established: 1893
- Named for: Bannister family
- Elevation: 748 ft (228 m)
- GNIS feature ID: 740656

Bannister is an unincorporated community in southwest Camden County, in the U.S. state of Missouri.

The community is on Missouri Route N 4.5 miles north of Macks Creek and 5.5 miles southeast of Climax Springs. The Little Niangua River flows past approximately one-half mile north of the site.

== History ==
A post office called Bannister was established in 1893, and remained in operation until 1916. The community most likely was named after the Bannister family.
