= Morgan M. Moulder =

American politician (1904–1976)

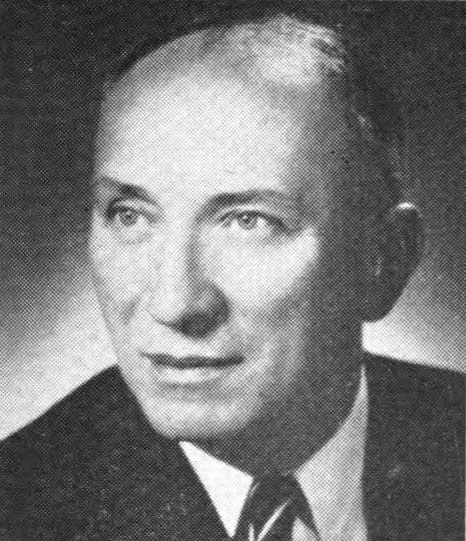

Member of the U.S. House of Representatives from Missouri
- In office January 3, 1949 – January 3, 1963
- Preceded by: Max Schwabe
- Succeeded by: District eliminated
- Constituency: 2nd district (1949–53); 11th district (1953–63)

Personal details
- Born: August 31, 1904 Linn Creek, Missouri, U.S.
- Died: November 12, 1976 (aged 72) Camdenton, Missouri, U.S.
- Party: Democratic

Morgan Moore Moulder (August 31, 1904 – November 12, 1976) was a U.S. representative from Missouri.

== Background ==
Born in Linn Creek, Missouri, Moulder attended the public schools of Linn Creek and Lebanon, Missouri, and the University of Missouri. He was graduated from Cumberland University, Lebanon, Tennessee, LL.B., 1927.

== Career ==
Moulder was admitted to the bar in 1928 and commenced the practice of law in Linn Creek, Missouri.

Moulder was elected prosecuting attorney of Camden County, Missouri, in 1928. He was reelected for three succeeding terms and served until 1938.

In 1938, he returned to the private practice of law.

From 1943 to 1946, he served as special assistant to the United States attorney for the western district of Missouri.

In April 1947, he was appointed by the Governor to serve as a judge of the circuit court in the eighteenth judicial circuit and served until December 31, 1948.

In 1948, Moulder was elected as a Democrat to the Eighty-first U.S. Congress; he was re-elected to the six succeeding Congresses (January 3, 1949 – January 3, 1963). He served on the House Un-American Activities Committee (HUAC); while a HUAC member in 1950, he heard testimony from Lee Pressman and Max Lowenthal, among others.

Moulder did not sign the 1956 Southern Manifesto, and voted in favor of the Civil Rights Acts of 1957 and 1960, as well as the 24th Amendment to the U.S. Constitution.

He did not seek renomination in 1962, and resumed the practice of law in Camdenton, Missouri.

== Personal life and death ==
Moulder died November 12, 1976. He was interred in Old Linn Creek Cemetery, near Camdenton.

U.S. House of Representatives
Preceded by Max Schwabe	Member of the U.S. House of Representatives from Missouri's 2nd congressional district 1949–1953	Succeeded by Thomas B. Curtis
Preceded by Claude I. Bakewell	Member of the U.S. House of Representatives from Missouri's 11th congressional district 1953–1963	Succeeded by District dissolved
