= Little Niangua Suspension Bridge =

- Coordinates: 38°03′55″N 92°54′34″W
- Carries: Route J
- Crosses: Little Niangua River
- Locale: Camden County, Missouri

Characteristics
- Width: 20 Feet
- Longest span: 225 Feet

History
- Constructed by: Clinton Bridge Company
- Opened: 1933

The Little Niangua Suspension Bridge is a Little Niangua River crossing in Camden County, Missouri on Route J. It is a two lane heavy vehicle bridge.

== History ==
The bridge was constructed in 1933 by the Clinton Bridge Company. It was designed as a self-anchored bridge.

== Status of bridge ==
In October 2007, it was closed for much needed repairs. These repairs included fixing movement underneath the deck. In 2019, a new bridge was built to bypass the old bridge. The old bridge is not in use anymore. It remains standing since locals lobbied to not have it demolished.

== Bridge Measurements ==
- Main Span- 225 Feet
- Side Spans- 112 Feet
- Deck Width- 20 Feet
