= Rainy Creek =

Rainy Creek may refer to:

- Rainy Creek (Lennox and Addington County), a creek in Ontario
- Rainy Creek (Missouri), a stream
