= Barnumton, Missouri =

Unincorporated community in Missouri, U.S.

Barnumton
- Unincorporated community
- Location of Barnumton in Missouri
- Coordinates: 38°06′36″N 92°56′12″W
- Country: United States
- State: Missouri
- County: Camden
- Post office established: 1867
- Named for: Barnum family

Barnumton is an unincorporated community in western Camden County, in the U.S. state of Missouri.

The community is on Missouri Route 7 approximately six miles east of Climax Springs. The Osage River and Lake of the Ozarks are about four miles to the north.

== History ==
A post office called Barnumton was established in 1867, and remained in operation until 1956. The community's name honors a Barnum family of settlers.
