= Toronto, Missouri =

Unincorporated community in Missouri, U.S.

Toronto
- Unincorporated community
- Location of Toronto in Missouri
- Coordinates: 38°00′13″N 92°31′32″W
- Country: United States
- State: Missouri
- County: Camden
- Post office established: 1856
- Named for: Toronto, Ontario

Toronto is an unincorporated community in Camden County, in the U.S. state of Missouri.

The community is approximately four miles northeast of Montreal just north of Missouri Route A. Wet Glaize Creek and the Toronto Springs Conservation Area are adjacent to the east of the site.

== History ==
A post office called Toronto was established in 1856, and remained in operation until 1942. The community was named after Toronto, Ontario, Canada, the native home of a share of the first settlers.
