= Damsel, Missouri =

Unincorporated community in Missouri, U.S.

Damsel
- Unincorporated community
- Location of Damsel in Missouri
- Coordinates: 38°06′35″N 92°41′25″W
- Country: United States
- US State: Missouri
- County: Camden
- Post office established: 1885

Damsel is an unincorporated community in Camden County, in the U.S. state of Missouri. The community is located between two arms of the Lake of the Ozarks along U.S. Route 54, approximately seven miles northeast of Camdenton and 4.5 miles southwest of Osage Beach.

== History ==
A post office called Damsel was established in 1885, and remained in operation until 1920. The origin of the name Damsel is uncertain.
