= Camdenton Memorial Airport =

Camdenton Memorial - Lake Regional Airport
- IATA: OZS; ICAO: KOZS; FAA LID: OZS

Summary
- Airport type: Public
- Owner: City of Camdenton
- Serves: Camdenton, Missouri
- Elevation AMSL: 1,062 ft (324 m)
- Coordinates: 37°58′26″N 092°41′28″W
- Interactive map of Camdenton Memorial - Lake Regional Airport

Runways
Direction	Length		Surface
Direction	ft	m	Surface
15/33	5,002	1,219	Asphalt

Statistics (2007)
- Aircraft operations: 3,015
- Based aircraft: 28
- Source: Federal Aviation Administration

Camdenton Memorial - Lake Regional Airport (IATA: OZS, ICAO: KOZS, FAA LID: OZS, formerly FAA LID: H21) (formerly Camdenton Memorial Airport) is a city-owned public-use airport located three nautical miles (6 km) southeast of the central business district of Camdenton, a city in Camden County, Missouri, United States. According to the FAA's National Plan of Integrated Airport Systems for 2009–2013, it is categorized as a general aviation facility.

== Facilities and aircraft ==
Camdenton Memorial - Lake Regional Airport covers an area of 192 acres (78 ha) at an elevation of 1,062 feet (324 m) above mean sea level. It has one runway designated 15/33 with an asphalt surface measuring 4,000 by 75 feet (1,219 x 23 m).

For the 12-month period ending August 1, 2007, the airport had 3,015 aircraft operations, an average of 251 per month: 99% general aviation and 1% military. At that time there were 28 aircraft based at this airport: 82% single-engine and 18% multi-engine.

== Air show ==
Every September, an air show is held at the airport.

== See also ==
- List of airports in Missouri
