= Passover (disambiguation) =

Passover is a major Jewish holiday that commemorates the Exodus of the Israelite people from Egypt, as described in the Torah.

Passover may also refer to:

- Passover (Samaritan holiday), a holiday in the Samaritan religion, based on the story of the Israelite Exodus described in the Samaritan Torah
- Passover (Christian holiday), a holiday among some Christian groups, derived from the Jewish observance and often linked with Easter
- Passover, Missouri, a community in the United States
- "Passover" (Rome), an episode of Rome
- Passover (album), an album by the Black Angels
- "Passover", a song by Joy Division from Closer
- "The Passover", a song by the Soundtrack of Our Lives from Communion
- Pass Over, a 2018 film by Spike Lee of the Antoinette Nwandu play

== See also ==
- Pascha (disambiguation)
- Pesach Osina, American politician
- Korban Pesach, the Hebrew language term for Passover sacrifice
- "A Rugrats Passover", a Rugrats episode
