= Fiery Fork Conservation Area =

Protected land in Missouri, U.S.

- IUCN category IV (habitat/species management area)
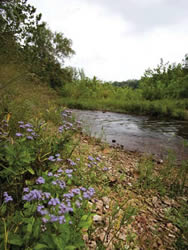
- The Little Niangua River running through Fiery Fork

- Location within Missouri
- Location: Camden County, Missouri, USA
- Nearest city: Camdenton, MO
- Coordinates: 38.088056°N 92.956111°W
- Area: 1,606 acres (6.5 km^{2})
- Governing body: Missouri Department of Conservation
- Website: Official website

Fiery Fork Conservation Area is a public area in Camden County, Missouri, along the Little Niangua River. It is 1,606 acres (6.50 km^{2}) large. It is mostly wooded with oak trees and some open space. The park includes a small campground, fishing, hiking, hunting, wildlife viewing, and small-boat access to the Little Niangua River.
