= Sagrada =

Sagrada is a Spanish word meaning "sacred".

Sagrada may also refer to:

- Sagrada, Missouri, a community in the United States
- La Sagrada Família, a church in Barcelona, Spain
- Cascara sagrada ("sacred bark") the common name for the medicinal plant Rhamnus purshiana
- Sagrada (board game), a dice-drafting board game
