= Neongwah, Missouri =

Unincorporated community in Missouri, U.S.

Neongwah
- Unincorporated community
- Location of Neongwah in Missouri
- Coordinates: 38°01′58″N 92°47′34″W
- Country: United States
- State: Missouri
- County: Camden
- Post office established: 1927
- Named for: Niangua River

Neongwah is an unincorporated community in Camden County, in the U.S. state of Missouri. The community sits above the Niangua River arm of the Lake of the Ozarks. Missouri Route 5 passes just east of the community and Camdenton is three miles to the southeast.

== History ==
A post office called Neongwah was established in 1927, and remained in operation until 1933. The community most likely derives its name from the Niangua River.
