= Sidney C. Roach =

American politician

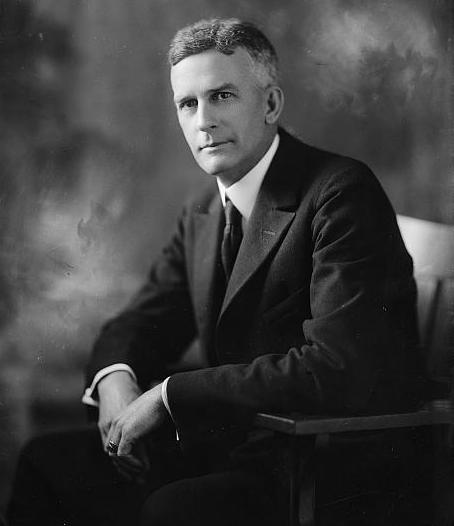

Member of the U.S. House of Representatives from Missouri's 8th district
- In office March 4, 1921 – March 3, 1925
- Preceded by: William L. Nelson
- Succeeded by: William L. Nelson

Member of the Missouri House of Representatives
- In office 1909-1913

Personal details
- Born: July 25, 1876 Linn Creek, Missouri, US
- Died: June 29, 1934 (aged 57) Kansas City, Missouri, US
- Party: Republican
- Education: Washington University in St. Louis
- Profession: lawyer

Sidney Crain Roach (July 25, 1876 – June 29, 1934) was a U.S. representative from Missouri.

Born at Linn Creek, Missouri, Roach attended the public schools and the St. Louis Law School (now the Washington University School of Law at Washington University in St. Louis. He was admitted to the bar in 1897 and commenced practice at Linn Creek, Missouri. He served as prosecuting attorney for Camden County in 1898–1909. In 1899, he married Edyth King. They had three children. He served as member of the board of directors of the National Bank of Linn Creek in 1900–1924. He served as member of the State house of representatives in 1909–1913. He served as delegate to the Republican National Convention in 1912.

Roach was elected as a Republican to the Sixty-seventh and Sixty-eighth Congresses (March 4, 1921 – March 3, 1925). He served as chairman of the Committee on Expenditures in the Department of Justice (Sixty-eighth Congress). He was an unsuccessful candidate for reelection in 1924 to the Sixty-ninth Congress. He moved to St. Louis, Missouri, December 27, 1924, and resumed the practice of law. He died in Kansas City, Missouri on June 29, 1934. He was interred in Roach Cemetery near Roach, Missouri.

U.S. House of Representatives
Preceded by William L. Nelson	Member of the U.S. House of Representatives from Missouri's 8th congressional district 1921–1925	Succeeded by William L. Nelson
