= Wet Glaize, Missouri =

Unincorporated community in Missouri, U.S.

Wet Glaize
- Unincorporated community
- Location of Wet Glaize in Missouri
- Coordinates: 37°55′20″N 92°32′02″W
- Country: United States
- State: Missouri
- County: Camden
- Post office established: 1848
- Named for: Wet Auglaize Creek

Wet Glaize is an unincorporated community in Camden County, in the Ozarks of central Missouri. The community is just east of Missouri Route 7 on Mill Creek, which is a tributary of the Wet Glaize Creek. Montreal is to the northwest on Route 7 and Richland is to the southeast. Mill Creek has a large fish hatchery in the vicinity of Wet Glaize.

== History ==
A post office called Wet Glaize was established in 1848, and remained in operation until 1938. The community took its name from nearby Wet Auglaize Creek.
