= Sagrada, Missouri =

Unincorporated community in the US

Sagrada
- Unincorporated community
- Location of Sagrada in Missouri
- Coordinates: 38°13′18″N 93°03′12″W
- Country: United States
- State: Missouri
- County: Camden
- Township: Adair
- Post office established: 1886

Sagrada is an unincorporated community in Camden County, in the U.S. state of Missouri. It is located in the far northwestern corner of the county, in Adair Township, just south of the Lake of the Ozarks.

== History ==
A post office called Sagrada was established in 1886, and remained in operation until 1933. The source of the name Sagrada is obscure.

Before completion of the Lake of the Ozarks in 1931, an Osage River crossing north of the post office was known as Sagrada Bridge, a swinging bridge built around 1908. On the north shore of the lake today (in Benton County) is a lake development known as Sagrada Beach.

One perhaps over-extensive list of communities flooded by the building of the lake (such as Linn Creek) includes Sagrada. However, while land along the river was inundated and the bridge had to be removed, the rural community was not flooded out of existence.
