= Pearson Branch =

Stream in the U.S. state of Missouri

Coordinates: 38°10′03″N 92°58′41″W

Pearson Branch is a stream in Camden County in the U.S. state of Missouri. It is a tributary to the Osage River within the Lake of the Ozarks. The north flowing stream enters the Lake near the lakeshore community of Dodds.

Pearson Branch has the name of a pioneer citizen.

== See also ==
- List of rivers of Missouri
