= Purvis, Missouri =

Unincorporated community in Missouri, U.S.

Purvis
- Unincorporated community
- Location of Purvis in Missouri
- Coordinates: 38°09′50″N 92°49′03″W
- Country: United States
- State: Missouri
- County: Camden
- Post office established: 1888
- Named for: Purvis family

Purvis is an unincorporated community in northern Camden County, in the U.S. state of Missouri. The community is located on the north shore of the Lake of the Ozarks. The Purvis cemetery is located to the southwest across the Brush Creek arm of the lake. The community of Laurie is located on Missouri Route 5 and is approximately two miles to the north, in Morgan County.

== History ==
A post office called Purvis was established in 1888, and remained in operation until 1945. The community has the name of a local family.
