= Bollinger Creek =

Stream in Camden County, Missouri, U.S.

Coordinates: 38.155586°N 92.9224143°W

Bollinger Creek is a stream in Camden County in the U.S. state of Missouri.

Bollinger Creek was named after the local Bollinger family.

== See also ==
- List of rivers of Missouri
