= Max Schwabe =

American politician (1905–1983)

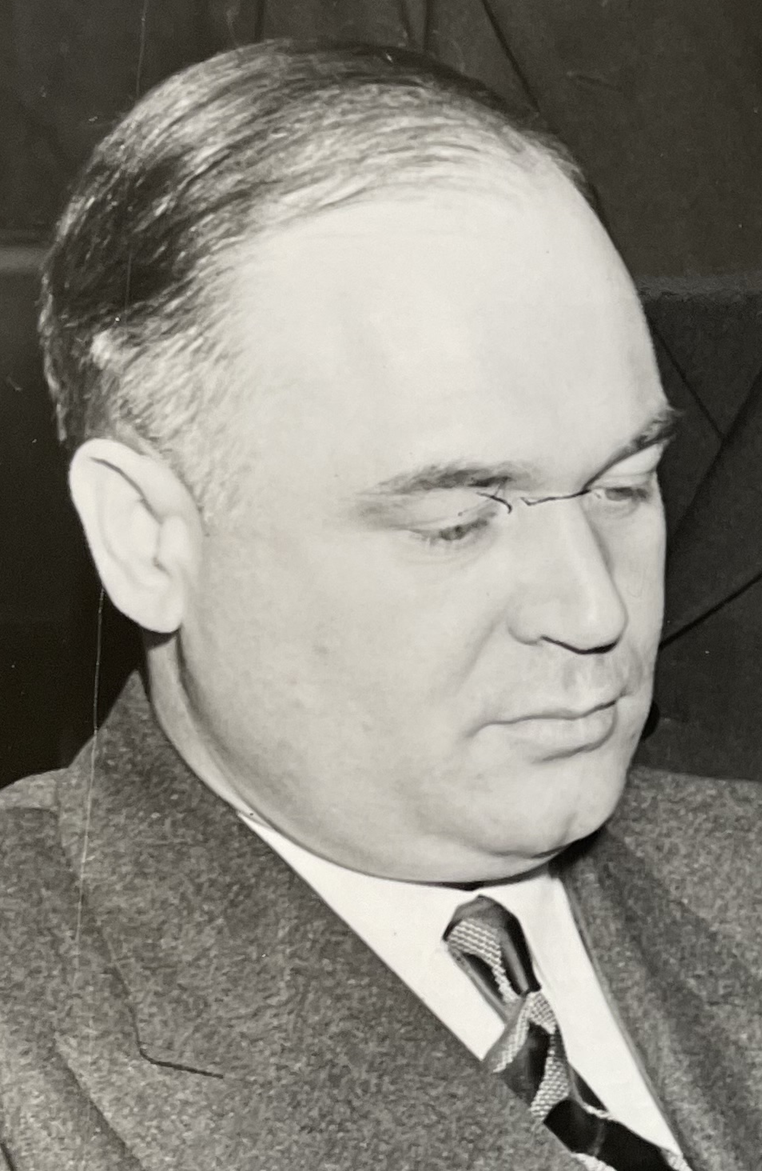
- Schwabe in 1945

Member of the U.S. House of Representatives from Missouri's 2nd district
- In office January 3, 1943 – January 3, 1949
- Preceded by: William L. Nelson
- Succeeded by: Morgan M. Moulder

Personal details
- Born: Leonard Max Schwabe; December 6, 1905 Columbia, Missouri, US
- Died: July 31, 1983 (aged 77) Columbia, Missouri, US
- Resting place: Columbia Cemetery
- Party: Republican
- Relations: George B. Schwabe (brother)
- Education: University of Missouri
- Profession: Politician

Leonard Max Schwabe (December 6, 1905 – July 31, 1983) was an American politician. A Republican, he was a member of the United States House of Representatives from Missouri between 1943 and 1949.

== Biography ==
Schwabe was born on December 6, 1905, near Columbia, Missouri, the son of George Washington Schwabe and Lulu Margaret (née Stotts) Schwabe. His half-brother was politician George B. Schwabe. In 1942, he graduated at the University of Missouri, with a Bachelor of Political Science. In a 1980 interview, he said he studied political trends "for hobby". He worked as a farmer and insurance agent.

Schwabe was a Republican. He was a member of the United States House of Representatives, from January 3, 1943, to January 3, 1949, representing Missouri's 2nd district. While serving, he was chairman of the Committee on Education and Workforce. He lost his re-election in 1948, 1950, and 1952; he ran for the 11th district in 1952. He was a delegate to the 1972 Republican National Convention. Ideologically, he was conservative. He supported lowering government spending and, later in his career, ending the Korean War.

After serving in Congress, Schwabe returned to working as an insurance agent. From 1953 to 1961, he was director for the Missouri branch of the Farmers Home Administration. On July 12, 1930, he married Georgia May Ashlock; they had two children together. He was Christian, as well as a member of Optimist International. He died on July 31, 1983, aged 77, in Columbia, and was buried at the Columbia Cemetery.

U.S. House of Representatives
Preceded by William L. Nelson	Member of the U.S. House of Representatives from Missouri's 2nd congressional district 1943–1949	Succeeded by Morgan M. Moulder
