= Rainy Creek (Missouri) =

Stream in the US state of Missouri

Rainy Creek is a stream in Benton and Camden Counties in the U.S. state of Missouri. It is a tributary of the Osage River within the waters of the Lake of the Ozarks.

The stream headwaters arise in Camden County on the west flank of Canefield Ridge and just north of the Climax Springs Lookout Tower and Missouri Route 7 at an elevation of about 980 feet (at 38°06′25″N 93°01′57″W. The stream flows west past the north side of Climax Springs. The stream turns northwest and enters Benton County briefly before turning to the northeast and re-entering Camden County. The stream enters an arm of the Lake of the Ozarks (at 38°10′22″N 93°02′13″W) at an elevation of 629 feet.

Rainy Creek derives its name from a settler named Rainey.

== See also ==
- List of rivers of Missouri
