= William L. Nelson (politician) =

American politician (1875–1946)

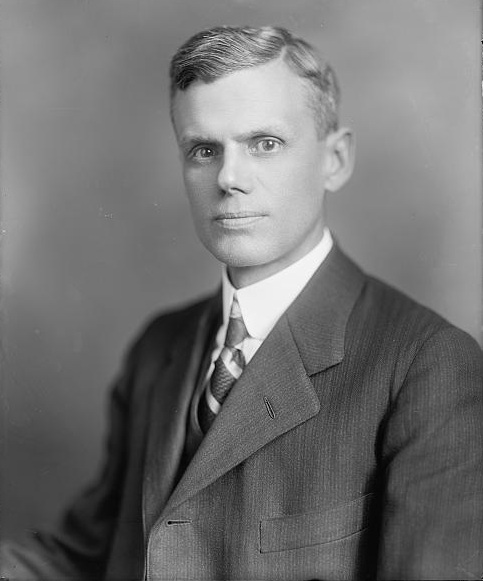
- Nelson in 1919
- Born: William Lester Nelson; August 4, 1875 near Bunceton, Missouri, United States
- Died: December 31, 1946 (aged 71); Columbia, Missouri, United States
- Burial place: Columbia Cemetery
- Education: Hooper Institute, William Jewell College, Missouri College of Agriculture
- Occupations: farmer and politician
- Years active: 1919–1921, 1925–1933, 1935–1943
- Known for: member, United States House of Representatives
- Political party: Democrat

William Lester Nelson (August 4, 1875 – December 31, 1946) was an American farmer and politician from Columbia, Missouri. He represented Missouri as a Democrat in the United States House of Representatives for several terms: 1919–1921, 1925–1933 and 1935–1943.

== Biography ==
Nelson was born on a farm near Bunceton, Missouri on August 4, 1875. He attended the local schools, the Hooper Institute in Clarksburg, Missouri, William Jewell College, and the Missouri College of Agriculture.

He taught school for five years and then became involved with his brothers in operating and editing a county newspaper in Bunceton. A Democrat, he served in the Missouri House of Representatives from 1901 to 1903 and 1905 to 1907.

Nelson moved to Columbia, Missouri to accept appointment as Assistant Secretary of the State Board of Agriculture, a position he held from 1908 to 1918. Nelson also operated his own farm and authored articles for several agricultural publications.

In 1918, Nelson was the successful Democratic nominee for a seat in the U.S. House, and he served in the 66th United States Congress, March 4, 1919, to March 3, 1921. He ran unsuccessfully for reelection in 1920, after which he was on the editorial staff of the Iowa Homestead, a major farming magazine. In 1924, he ran successfully for the U.S. House. He was reelected three times, and served in the 69th, 70th, 71st, and 72nd Congresses (March 4, 1925 to March 3, 1933). He was an unsuccessful candidate for renomination in 1932, and again returned to farming and writing in Columbia.

In 1934, he was again elected to the U.S. House. He was reelected three times, and served in the 74th, 75th, 76th and 77th Congresses (January 3, 1935 to January 3, 1943). He was an unsuccessful candidate for reelection in 1942.

After leaving Congress in 1943 Nelson served as Assistant to J. Marvin Jones, the federal War Food Administrator during World War II. Later in 1943, Nelson returned to Columbia, where he lived in retirement.

Nelson died in Columbia on December 31, 1946, and was buried at Columbia Cemetery.

U.S. House of Representatives
Preceded by Dorsey W. Shackleford	Member of the U.S. House of Representatives from Missouri's 8th congressional district 1919–1921	Succeeded by Sidney C. Roach
Preceded by Sidney C. Roach	Member of the U.S. House of Representatives from Missouri's 8th congressional district 1925–1933	Succeeded by Clyde Williams
Preceded by None (New district)	Member of the U.S. House of Representatives from Missouri's 2nd congressional district 1935–1943	Succeeded by Max Schwabe
