= C. Jasper Bell =

American politician (1885–1978)

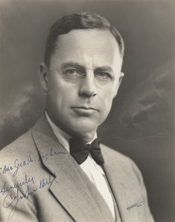

Member of the U.S. House of Representatives from Missouri's 4th district
- In office January 3, 1935 – January 3, 1949
- Preceded by: Vacant
- Succeeded by: Leonard Irving

Personal details
- Born: January 16, 1885 Lake City, Colorado
- Died: January 21, 1978 (aged 93) Kansas City, Missouri
- Party: Democratic Party
- Education: University of Missouri; Kansas City School of Law

Charles Jasper Bell (January 16, 1885 – January 21, 1978) was a U.S. Representative from Missouri.

Born in Lake City, Colorado, Bell attended the country schools in Jackson County, Missouri, Lees Summit (Missouri) High School, and the University of Missouri. He graduated from the Kansas City School of Law in 1913 and was admitted to the bar the same year, commencing to practice in Kansas City, Missouri. He served as a member of the city council of Kansas City from 1926 to 1930 and as a member of the committee to draft the administrative code, which the current general law of Kansas City, Missouri, is based on. Additionally, he served as judge of the circuit court of Jackson County, Missouri, from 1931 until his resignation in 1934.

Bell was elected as a Democrat to the seventy-fourth through Eightieth Congresses, serving from January 3, 1935, to January 3, 1949. He served as chairman of the Committee on Elections No. 1 during the Seventy-sixth and Seventy-seventh Congresses, and of the Committee on Insular Affairs in the Seventy-eighth and Seventy-ninth Congresses. Bell also served as a member of the Filipino Rehabilitation Commission in 1945 and 1946. He did not run for reelection in 1948 to the Eighty-first Congress, and resumed the practice of law, specifically managing private investments.

He died in Kansas City, Missouri, on January 21, 1978. He was interred in Blue Springs Cemetery, Blue Springs, Missouri.

U.S. House of Representatives
| Preceded by None (New district) | Member of the U.S. House of Representatives from Missouri's 4th congressional district 1935–1949 | Succeeded by Leonard Irving |
