= Jeffrey P. Hillelson =

American politician (1919–2003)

Jeffrey Paul Hillelson
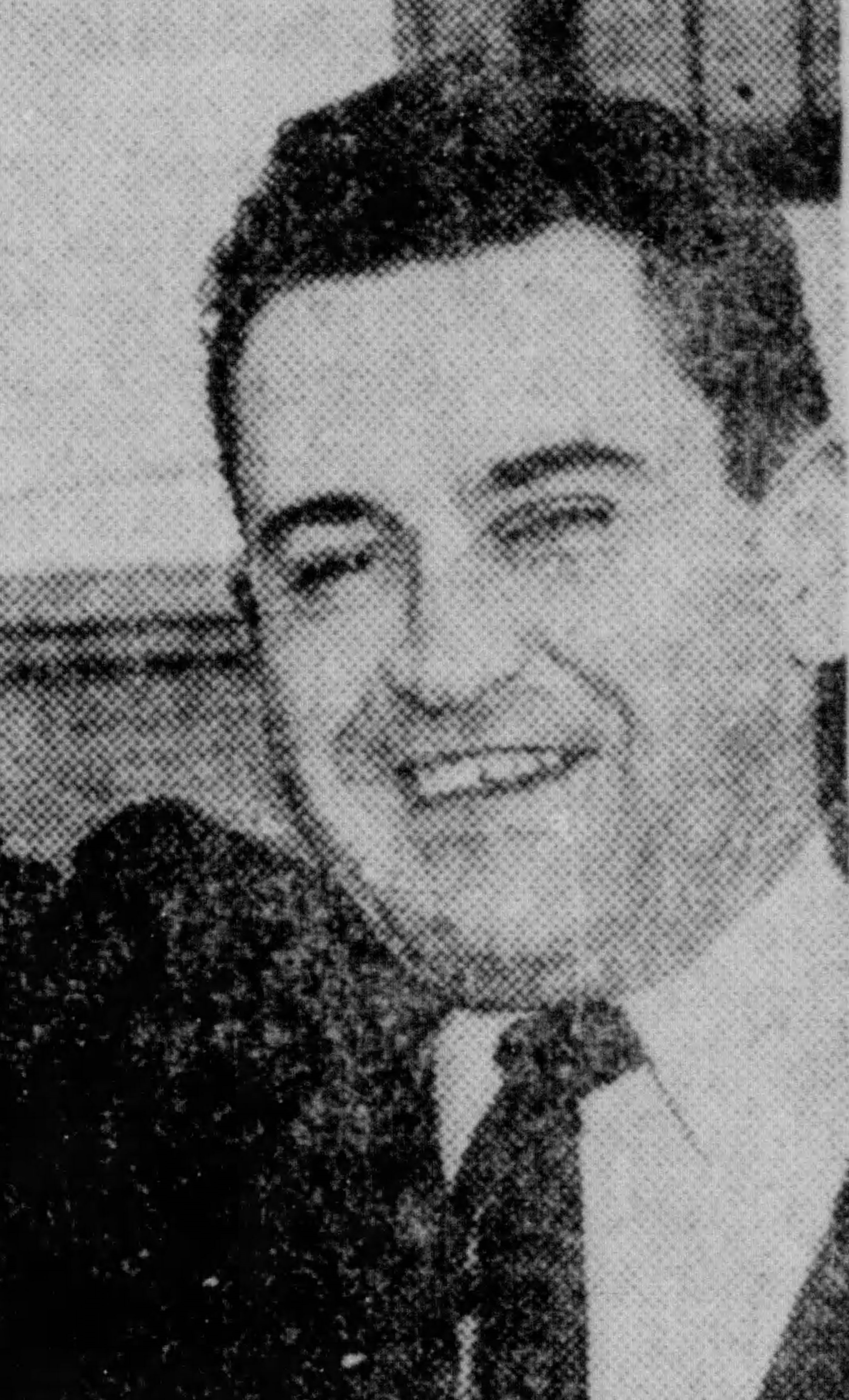

Member of the U.S. House of Representatives from Missouri's 4th district
- In office January 3, 1953 – January 3, 1955
- Preceded by: Leonard Irving
- Succeeded by: George H. Christopher

Personal details
- Born: March 9, 1919 Springfield, Ohio, U.S.
- Died: May 28, 2003 (aged 84) Shawnee Mission, Kansas, U.S.
- Party: Republican

Jeffrey Paul Hillelson (March 9, 1919 – May 28, 2003) was a U.S. Representative from Missouri.

== Early life and education ==
Born in Springfield, Ohio, Hillelson attended the public schools. He graduated from the University of Missouri–Kansas City 1947. He was in the United States Army from 1942 to 1946, retaining his commission in the Reserve. Business owner from 1947 to 1952. He was a member of Tau Kappa Epsilon fraternity.

== Political career ==
He served as chair of the Republican City Central Committee of Independence, Missouri, 1949. Hillelson was elected as a Republican to the Eighty-third Congress (January 3, 1953 – January 3, 1955). He was an unsuccessful candidate for reelection to the Eighty-fourth Congress in 1954. Hillelson was appointed Executive Assistant to the Postmaster General, Washington, D.C., from January 3, 1955, until his resignation September 22, 1955. He was an unsuccessful candidate for election in 1956 to the Eighty-fifth Congress. He served as a delegate to Republican State conventions, 1948, 1952, and 1956. He served as a delegate to the Republican National Convention, 1956. He was appointed acting postmaster of Kansas City, Missouri from 1957 to 1961. Hillelson was elected a member of Kansas City, Missouri, city council from April 1963 until June 1969. Hillelson was appointed Regional Administrator of the General Services Administration in Kansas City from 1969 to 1974. He served on the Johnson County, Kansas, commission from 1981 to 1982. He died on May 28, 2003, in Shawnee Mission, Kansas and is interred in Arlington National Cemetery.

U.S. House of Representatives
Preceded by Leonard Irving	Member of the U.S. House of Representatives from Missouri's 4th congressional district 1953–1955	Succeeded by George H. Christopher
