= Huffmans Creek =

River in the United States of America

Coordinates: 37.9778106°N 93.0985266°W

Huffmans Creek is a stream in Hickory County in the U.S. state of Missouri. It is a tributary of the Little Niangua River.

Huffmans Creek bears the name of a pioneer citizen.

== See also ==
- List of rivers of Missouri
