= Leonard Irving =

American politician

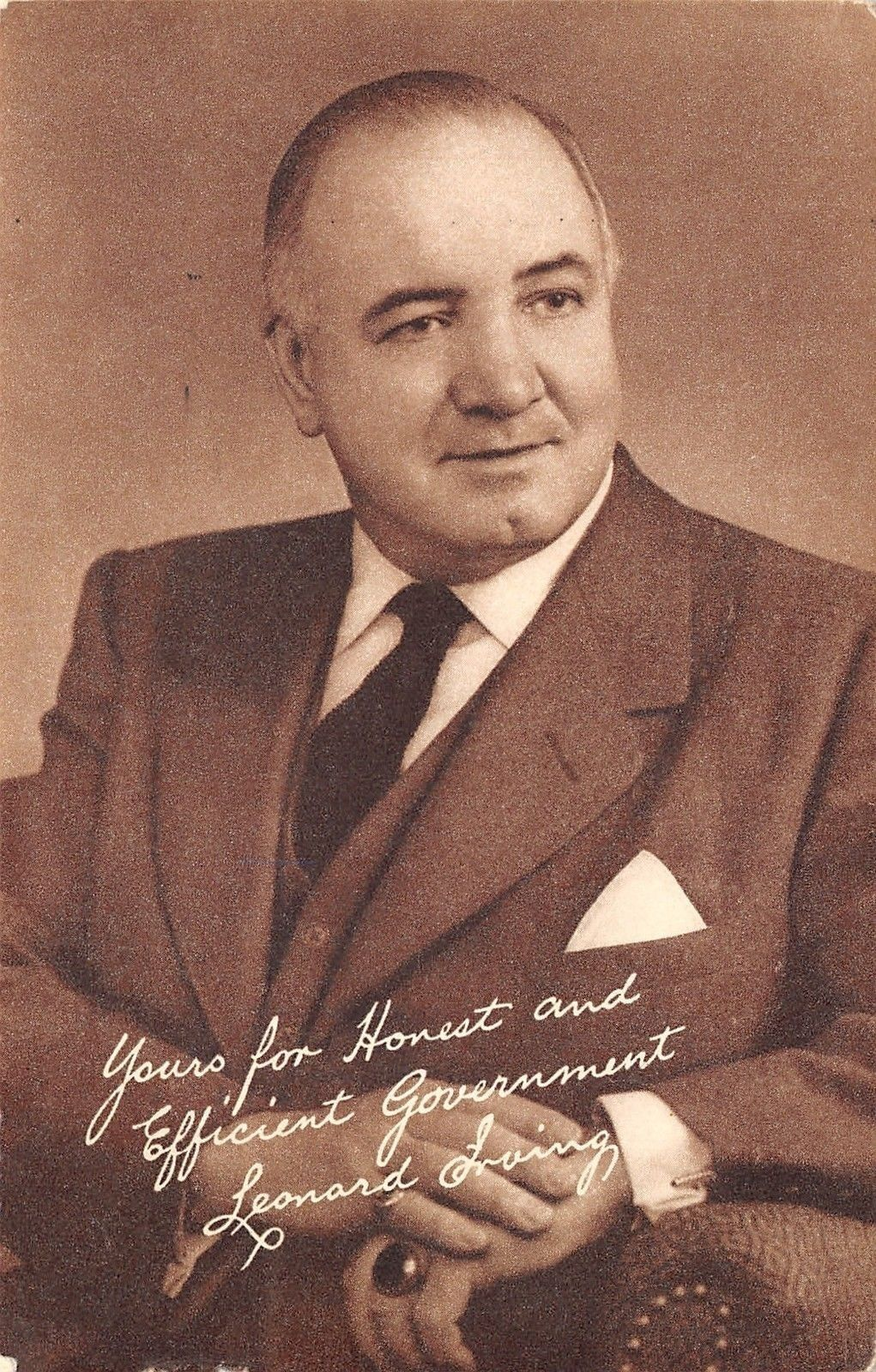
- Postcard photo from 1954 campaign for the US House

Member of the U.S. House of Representatives from Missouri's 4th district
- In office January 3, 1949 – January 3, 1953
- Preceded by: C. Jasper Bell
- Succeeded by: Jeffrey Paul Hillelson

Personal details
- Born: Theodore Leonard Irving; March 24, 1898 St. Paul, Minnesota, U.S.
- Died: March 8, 1962 (aged 63) Washington, D.C., U.S.
- Resting place: Mount Moriah Cemetery, Kansas City, Missouri, U.S.
- Party: Democratic

Theodore Leonard Irving (March 24, 1898 – March 8, 1962) was a U.S. representative from Missouri.

Born in St. Paul, Ramsey County, Minnesota, Irving moved with his parents to a farm in North Dakota, where he attended the public schools. He worked for a railroad as a boy and during the First World War; later, he left the railroad to become manager of a theater in Montana. Irving then moved to California and was manager of a hotel. He moved to Jackson County, Missouri, in 1934 and was employed as a construction worker and later became a representative of the American Federation of Labor.

Irving was elected as a Democrat to the Eighty-first and Eighty-second Congresses (January 3, 1949 – January 3, 1953). He was unsuccessful for reelection in 1952 and in a bid for the Democratic nomination in 1954. He once again became a labor organizer, and later was president of a labor union in Kansas City, Missouri.

He died on March 8, 1962, in Washington, D.C., while on a business trip, and was interred in Mount Moriah Cemetery in Kansas City.

== Electoral history ==
1948 Missouri's 4th congressional district
Party	Candidate	Votes	%
Democratic	Leonard Irving	74,725	64.1%
Republican	Richard A. Erickson	41,576	35.7%
Progressive	R.D. Farnsworth	252	0.2%
Socialist Labor	Karl Oberheu	11	0.01%
Majority		—	—
Democratic hold

1950 Missouri's 4th congressional district
Party	Candidate	Votes	%
Democratic	Leonard Irving	53,424	61.6%
Republican	Vernon D. Fulcrut	33,367	38.4%
Majority		—	—
Democratic hold

1952 Missouri's 4th congressional district
Party	Candidate	Votes	%
Democratic	Leonard Irving	84,899	46.7%
Republican	Jeffrey P. Hillelson	96,988	53.3%
Majority		—	—
Republican gain from Democratic

== See also ==
- List of Jewish members of the United States Congress

U.S. House of Representatives
Preceded by C. Jasper Bell	Member of the U.S. House of Representatives from Missouri's 4th congressional district 1949–1953	Succeeded by Jeffrey Paul Hillelson
