= Friedenswald, Missouri =

- Village
- Friedenswald's position in Missouri
- Coordinates: 38°04′26″N 92°45′32″W
- Country: United States
- State: Missouri
- County: Camden
- Township: Osceola

Area
  - Total: 0.10 sq mi (0.26 km^{2})
  - Land: 0.10 sq mi (0.26 km^{2})
  - Water: 0 sq mi (0.00 km^{2})
- Elevation: 814 ft (248 m)

Population (2020)
  - Total: 4
  - Density: 39.7/sq mi (15.34/km^{2})
- Time zone: UTC-6 (Central (CST))
  - Summer (DST): UTC-5 (CDT)
- ZIP code: 65020
- Area code: 573
- GNIS feature ID: 2807612

Friedenswald is a village that was incorporated in 2008 and ratified by the Camden County, Missouri Commission under the Missouri Village Law. Friedenswald is located in the central part of Camden County, Missouri, on Lake Road 5-89. It comprises approximately 65 acres and is governed by a board of trustees. The village is one of the smallest in the U.S.; as of the 2020 census, Friedenswald had a population of 4.
