= Passover, Missouri =

Unincorporated community in Missouri, U.S.

Passover
- Unincorporated community
- Location of Passover in Missouri
- Coordinates: 38°04′51″N 92°35′57″W
- Country: United States
- State: Missouri
- County: Camden
- Post office established: 1901
- Founder: Johnny Passover
- Named for: Johnny Passover (Likely)

Passover is an unincorporated community in Camden County, in the U.S. state of Missouri. The location is on a narrow peninsula, jutting north into the Grandglaize Creek Arm in the southeastern portion of the Lake of the Ozarks. The community is approximately three miles north of Missouri Route A on a county road.

== History ==
A post office called Passover was established in 1901, and remained in operation until 1931. The origin of the name Passover is uncertain, although it is believed that it came from the town's founder Johnny Passover.
