= Little Niangua River =

Stream in the American state of Missouri

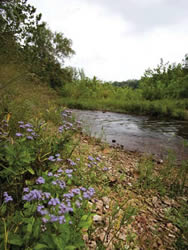
- The Little Niangua River running through Fiery Fork Conservation Area.

Location
- Country: United States
- State: Missouri

Physical characteristics
- Source
  - location: Dallas County, Missouri
  - coordinates: 37°44′55″N 93°01′15″W
  - elevation: 1,179 ft (359 m)
- Mouth: Lake of the Ozarks
  - location: Camden County, Missouri
  - coordinates: 38°04′17″N 92°54′24″W
  - elevation: 663 ft (202 m)
- Length: 64 mi (103 km)
- Basin size: 320 mi^{2} (830 km^{2})
- Discharge
  - location: USGS 06925250 near Macks Creek, MO
  - average: 150 cu ft/s (4.2 m^{3}/s)
  - minimum: 0 cu ft/s (0 m^{3}/s)
  - maximum: 6,730 cu ft/s (191 m^{3}/s)

Basin features
- Tributaries
  - left: Huffmans Creek
- Watersheds: Little Niangua-Niangua-Osage-Missouri-Mississippi

The Little Niangua River is a 64.4-mile-long (103.6 km) tributary of the Niangua River in the Ozarks region of central Missouri in the United States. Via the Niangua, Osage and Missouri rivers, it is part of the watershed of the Mississippi River. The Little Niangua was so named for its smaller size relative to the Niangua River.

== Description ==
The Little Niangua rises in Dallas County and flows generally northeasterly through Hickory and Camden counties. It joins the Niangua River in Camden County as an arm of the Lake of the Ozarks, which is formed by a dam on the Osage River.

== Niangua darter ==
The upper reaches of the Little Niangua River, including the tributaries of Cahoochie Creek and Thomas Creek in Dallas County, are known habitats of the Niangua darter, a small fish that is on the U.S. Fish and Wildlife Service's list of Endangered Species.

== Public areas ==
There are multiple river accesses on the Little Niangua River, including Bannister Hollow, Fiery Fork and most areas where a road crosses the river.

== See also ==
- List of Missouri rivers
- Little Niangua Suspension Bridge
