= Sunrise Beach, Missouri =

Village in Missouri, US

- Village
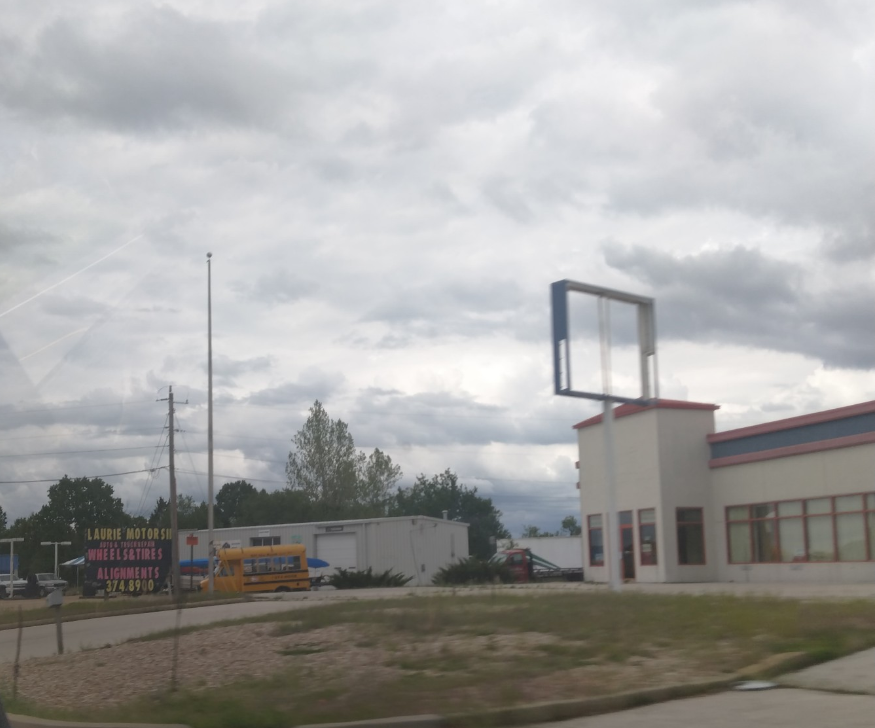
- Sunrise Beach in May 2024

- Location within Missouri Location within the United States
- Coordinates: 38°10′47″N 92°46′21″W
- Country: United States
- State: Missouri
- Counties: Camden; Morgan
- Incorporated: 1932

Area
  - Total: 5.75 sq mi (14.90 km^{2})
  - Land: 5.75 sq mi (14.88 km^{2})
  - Water: 0.0077 sq mi (0.02 km^{2})
- Elevation: 791 ft (241 m)

Population (2020)
  - Total: 431
  - Density: 75.0/sq mi (28.97/km^{2})
- Time zone: UTC-6 (Central (CST))
  - Summer (DST): UTC-5 (CDT)
- ZIP code: 65079
- Area code: 573
- FIPS code: 29-71728
- GNIS feature ID: 2399935
- Website: www.sunrisebeachmo.gov

Sunrise Beach is a village in Camden and Morgan counties in the U.S. state of Missouri. The population was 431 at the 2020 census, unchanged from 2010.

== History ==
A post office called Sunrise Beach has been in operation since 1932. The village was named for its location near the Lake of the Ozarks.

== Geography ==
Sunrise Beach is in northern Camden County, with a small portion extending north into the southeast corner of Morgan County. Missouri Route 5 (Sunset Boulevard) runs the length of the village, leading northwest 3 miles (5 km) to Laurie and 21 miles (34 km) to Versailles, and south 15 miles (24 km) to Camdenton.

According to the U.S. Census Bureau, the village has a total area of 5.82 square miles (15.07 km^{2}), of which 0.01 square miles (0.03 km^{2}), or 0.17%, are water. The village sits on the crest of a neck of land bordered by the Lake of the Ozarks. The village limits extend to the lakeshore in several locations to the northeast, southeast, and southwest.

== Demographics ==
Historical population
Census	Pop.	Note	%±
1960	78		—
1970	126		61.5%
1980	148		17.5%
1990	181		22.3%
2000	368		103.3%
2010	431		17.1%
2020	431		0.0%
U.S. Decennial Census

=== 2010 census ===
As of the census of 2010, there were 431 people, 207 households, and 122 families living in the village. The population density was 78.5 inhabitants per square mile (30.3/km^{2}). There were 418 housing units at an average density of 76.1 per square mile (29.4/km^{2}). The racial makeup of the village was 94.7% White, 0.2% African American, 1.6% Native American, 0.5% from other races, and 3.0% from two or more races. Hispanic or Latino of any race were 3.0% of the population.

There were 207 households, of which 21.7% had children under the age of 18 living with them, 43.0% were married couples living together, 10.6% had a female householder with no husband present, 5.3% had a male householder with no wife present, and 41.1% were non-families. 32.4% of all households were made up of individuals, and 18.4% had someone living alone who was 65 years of age or older. The average household size was 2.08 and the average family size was 2.51.

The median age in the village was 48.9 years. 16.7% of residents were under the age of 18; 7.7% were between the ages of 18 and 24; 19.3% were from 25 to 44; 27.9% were from 45 to 64; and 28.5% were 65 years of age or older. The gender makeup of the village was 48.0% male and 52.0% female.

=== 2000 census ===
As of the census of 2000, there were 368 people, 171 households, and 112 families living in the village. The population density was 83.0 inhabitants per square mile (32.0/km^{2}). There were 350 housing units at an average density of 79.0 per square mile (30.5/km^{2}). The racial makeup of the village was 93.48% White, 2.17% Native American, 0.54% Asian, 1.09% from other races, and 2.72% from two or more races. Hispanic or Latino of any race were 1.90% of the population.

There were 171 households, out of which 15.2% had children under the age of 18 living with them, 59.1% were married couples living together, 4.7% had a female householder with no husband present, and 34.5% were non-families. 28.1% of all households were made up of individuals, and 14.6% had someone living alone who was 65 years of age or older. The average household size was 2.15 and the average family size was 2.52.

In the village, the population was spread out, with 14.9% under the age of 18, 6.3% from 18 to 24, 19.6% from 25 to 44, 29.9% from 45 to 64, and 29.3% who were 65 years of age or older. The median age was 51 years. For every 100 females, there were 96.8 males. For every 100 females age 18 and over, there were 92.0 males.

The median income for a household in the village was $27,679, and the median income for a family was $30,833. Males had a median income of $21,016 versus $15,536 for females. The per capita income for the village was $17,382. About 6.3% of families and 10.7% of the population were below the poverty line, including 43.9% of those under age 18 and 4.3% of those age 65 or over.

== Education ==
Camdenton R-III School District operates Hurricane Deck Elementary School at Sunrise Beach. Lake Christian Academy is a private institution located within the village.

Sunrise Beach has a public library, a branch of the Camden County Library District.
