= Montreal, Missouri =

- Census-designated place
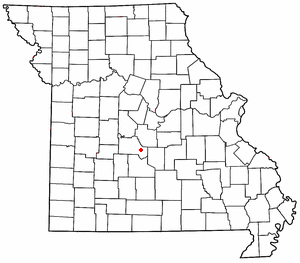
- Location of Montreal in Missouri
- Coordinates: 37°58′11″N 92°35′22″W
- Country: United States
- State: Missouri
- County: Camden

Area
  - Total: 1.36 sq mi (3.52 km^{2})
  - Land: 1.36 sq mi (3.52 km^{2})
  - Water: 0 sq mi (0.00 km^{2})
- Elevation: 1,037 ft (316 m)

Population (2020)
  - Total: 119
  - Density: 87.5/sq mi (33.78/km^{2})
- FIPS code: 29-49646
- GNIS feature ID: 2587093

Montreal is an unincorporated community in southeast Camden County, Missouri, United States. It is located approximately eight miles (13 km) east-southeast of Camdenton and 12 miles (19 km) northwest of Richland on Route 7.

A post office called Montreal has been in operation since 1861. The community was named after Montreal, in Quebec, Canada, the native home of a share of the first settlers.

== Demographics ==
Historical population
Census	Pop.	Note	%±
2020	119		—
U.S. Decennial Census
