= Linn Creek, Missouri =

- City
- City of Linn Creek
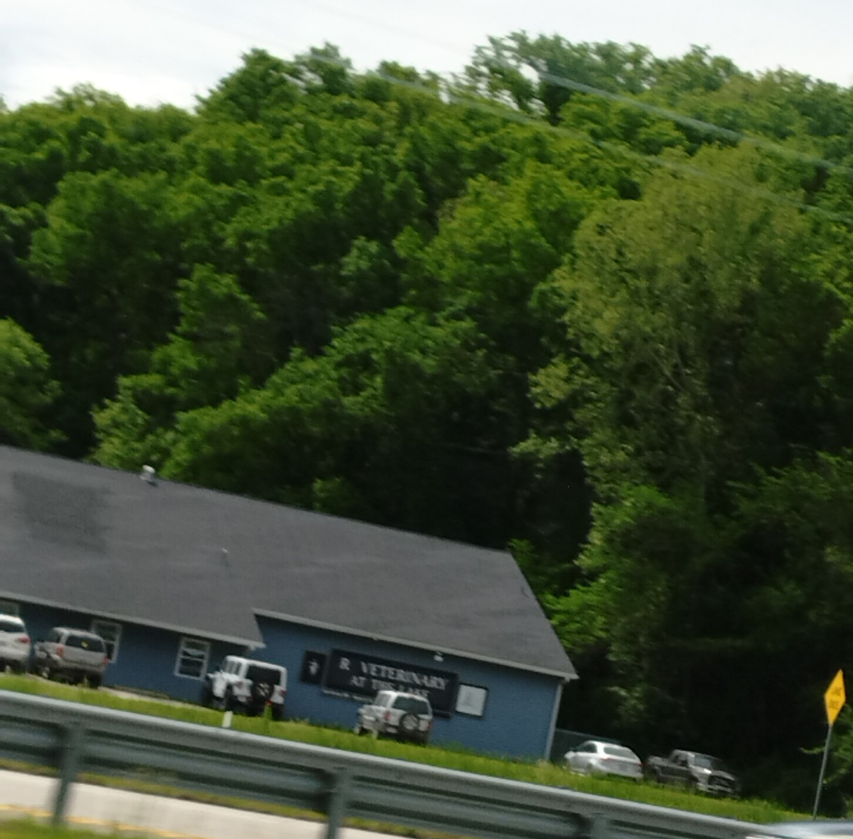
- Linn Creek in May 2024
- Motto: Rising To Endless Horizons
- Location of Linn Creek, Missouri
- Coordinates: 38°02′04″N 92°42′14″W
- Country: United States
- State: Missouri
- County: Camden
- Founded: 1841

Government
  - Type: Mayor-council government
  - Mayor: Jeff Davis

Area
  - Total: 1.30 sq mi (3.36 km^{2})
  - Land: 1.30 sq mi (3.36 km^{2})
  - Water: 0 sq mi (0.00 km^{2})
- Elevation: 764 ft (233 m)

Population (2020)
  - Total: 216
  - Density: 166.5/sq mi (64.27/km^{2})
- Time zone: UTC-6 (Central (CST))
  - Summer (DST): UTC-5 (CDT)
- ZIP code: 65052
- Area code: 573
- FIPS code: 29-43274
- GNIS feature ID: 2395721
- Website: linncreekmo.com

Linn Creek is a city in Camden County, Missouri, United States. The population was 216 at the 2020 census.

The original Linn Creek, which was the former county seat of Camden County, Missouri, is now under water, in the Lake of the Ozarks. Construction of the Bagnell Dam that created the lake was begun August 8, 1929. The county seat was moved to the new town of Camdenton which had its beginnings in 1931.

== History ==
=== Old Linn Creek ===
Linn Creek was settled in 1841 at the junction of the Niangua and Osage Rivers. It was named from the creek on which it is situated, and which was named for the many linden trees lining its banks. The city was considered a head of navigation on the Osage and became a major hub for transportation in southwest Missouri.

Linn Creek became the county seat in 1855 after a cholera epidemic killed most of the population of the former county seat of Erie.

A skirmish took place on October 14, 1861 between Union soldiers of the 13th Illinois, Fremont Battalion (Missouri) Cavalry and Confederates of Captain William Roberts.

The local newspaper, The Linn Creek Reveille, was created and published by J. W. Vincent from 1879 until his death in 1933. According to J. W. Vincent, the Moulder family was the most numerous and prominent family in the county

=== Modern Linn Creek ===
In 1929, it was announced that the Bagnell Dam would be constructed and the town would be flooded, causing controversy among the city's citizens. Almost all of the buildings were demolished, and the city was moved to a higher elevation, losing its designation as the county seat. The location where Linn Creek now resides was formerly the location of a small settlement called Easterville.

"New Linn Creek" became a common name for the new town. The Linn Creek Chamber of Commerce promoted the town as "The Miracle City."

== Geography ==
According to the United States Census Bureau, the city has a total area of 1.31 square miles (3.39 km^{2}), all land.

== Demographics ==
Historical population
Census	Pop.	Note	%±
1870	132		—
1900	340		—
1910	435		27.9%
1920	431		−0.9%
1930	553		28.3%
1940	202		−63.5%
1950	162		−19.8%
1960	174		7.4%
1970	268		54.0%
1980	242		−9.7%
1990	232		−4.1%
2000	280		20.7%
2010	244		−12.9%
2020	216		−11.5%
U.S. Decennial Census

=== 2010 census ===
As of the census of 2010, there were 244 people, 102 households, and 59 families living in the city. The population density was 186.3 inhabitants per square mile (71.9/km^{2}). There were 116 housing units at an average density of 88.5 per square mile (34.2/km^{2}). The racial makeup of the city was 98.8% White, 0.8% Pacific Islander, and 0.4% from two or more races. Hispanic or Latino of any race were 1.6% of the population.

There were 102 households, of which 30.4% had children under the age of 18 living with them, 41.2% were married couples living together, 14.7% had a female householder with no husband present, 2.0% had a male householder with no wife present, and 42.2% were non-families. 32.4% of all households were made up of individuals, and 7.8% had someone living alone who was 65 years of age or older. The average household size was 2.26 and the average family size was 2.90.

The median age in the city was 40 years. 20.9% of residents were under the age of 18; 10.3% were between the ages of 18 and 24; 29% were from 25 to 44; 30.8% were from 45 to 64; and 9% were 65 years of age or older. The gender makeup of the city was 52.9% male and 47.1% female.

=== 2000 census ===
As of the census of 2000, there were 280 people, 94 households, and 59 families living in the city. The population density was 252.9 inhabitants per square mile (97.6/km^{2}). There were 104 housing units at an average density of 93.9 per square mile (36.3/km^{2}). The racial makeup of the city was 96.79% White, 0.36% African American, 0.71% from other races, and 2.14% from two or more races. Hispanic or Latino of any race were 3.21% of the population.

There were 94 households, out of which 38.3% had children under the age of 18 living with them, 41.5% were married couples living together, 13.8% had a female householder with no husband present, and 36.2% were non-families. 28.7% of all households were made up of individuals, and 12.8% had someone living alone who was 65 years of age or older. The average household size was 2.73 and the average family size was 3.30.

In the city, the population was spread out, with 30.0% under the age of 18, 10.4% from 18 to 24, 30.4% from 25 to 44, 16.8% from 45 to 64, and 12.5% who were 65 years of age or older. The median age was 31 years. For every 100 females, there were 129.5 males. For every 100 females age 18 and over, there were 122.7 males.

The median income for a household in the city was $22,125, and the median income for a family was $27,321. Males had a median income of $25,833 versus $16,625 for females. The per capita income for the city was $11,009. About 17.5% of families and 19.9% of the population were below the poverty line, including 18.9% of those under the age of eighteen and 12.5% of those 65 or over.

== Notable people ==
- Morgan M. Moulder, U.S. representative from Missouri
