= Roach, Missouri =

Unincorporated community in Missouri, U.S.

Roach
- Unincorporated community
- Location of Roach in Missouri
- Coordinates: 37°59′38″N 92°50′11″W
- Country: United States
- State: Missouri
- County: Camden
- Named for: Roach family

Roach is an unincorporated community in southern Camden County, Missouri, United States. It is located north of U.S. Route 54 on Missouri Route AA, approximately five miles west of Camdenton and 2.5 miles west of the Niangua River arm of the Lake of the Ozarks. The ZIP Code for Roach is 65787.

The community was named after the Roach family of pioneer settlers, who migrated from Tennessee in 1831. Littleberry "Jack" Roach served as Camden County sheriff in 1868, then as county clerk and probate judge. There was a post office at Roach from 1887 to 1897, and since 1904.
