= Climax Springs, Missouri =

- Census-designated place
- Nickname: Climax
- Location of Climax Springs, Missouri
- Coordinates: 38°06′15″N 93°03′01″W
- Country: United States
- State: Missouri
- County: Camden

Area
  - Total: 0.81 sq mi (2.09 km^{2})
  - Land: 0.81 sq mi (2.09 km^{2})
  - Water: 0 sq mi (0.00 km^{2})
- Elevation: 971 ft (296 m)

Population (2020)
  - Total: 118
  - Density: 146.3/sq mi (56.49/km^{2})
- Time zone: UTC-6 (Central (CST))
  - Summer (DST): UTC-5 (CDT)
- ZIP code: 65324
- Area code: 573
- FIPS code: 29-14914
- GNIS feature ID: 0755543

Climax Springs is a census-designated place and former village in Camden County, Missouri, United States. The population was 118 at the 2020 census.

== History ==
A post office called Climax was established in 1883, and the name was changed to Climax Springs in 1886. The community took its name from a mineral spring near the original town site. According to tradition, an enthusiastic settler cried "that caps the climax!" upon discovering the spring and realizing its potential as a mineral spa.

In 2015, Climax Springs disincorporated.

== Geography ==
Climax Springs is located just north of Missouri Route 7 one-half mile east of the Camden–Benton county line. The Lake of the Ozarks lies approximately six miles to the northeast.

According to the United States Census Bureau, the village has a total area of 0.46 square miles (1.19 km^{2}), all land. The town is located on a ridge-like landform in the northern Ozarks. It is approximately six miles south of the Lake of the Ozarks, and about 4 miles north of the Little Niangua River. The area just southeast of Climax Springs is called Kolb Hollow, with Kolb Branch running through it.

== Demographics ==
Historical population
Census	Pop.	Note	%±
1950	151		—
1960	93		−38.4%
1970	104		11.8%
1980	87		−16.3%
1990	91		4.6%
2000	80		−12.1%
2010	124		55.0%
2020	118		−4.8%
U.S. Decennial Census

=== 2010 census ===
As of the census of 2010, there were 124 people, 46 households, and 32 families living in the village. The population density was 269.6 inhabitants per square mile (104.1/km^{2}). There were 60 housing units at an average density of 130.4 per square mile (50.3/km^{2}). The racial makeup of the village was 96.8% White and 3.2% from other races. Hispanic or Latino of any race were 4.0% of the population.

There were 46 households, of which 43.5% had children under the age of 18 living with them, 39.1% were married couples living together, 19.6% had a female householder with no husband present, 10.9% had a male householder with no wife present, and 30.4% were non-families. 26.1% of all households were made up of individuals, and 10.8% had someone living alone who was 65 years of age or older. The average household size was 2.70 and the average family size was 3.09.

The median age in the village was 39 years. 33.1% of residents were under the age of 18; 7.2% were between the ages of 18 and 24; 19.3% were from 25 to 44; 31.3% were from 45 to 64; and 8.9% were 65 years of age or older. The gender makeup of the village was 53.2% male and 46.8% female.

=== 2000 census ===
As of the census of 2000, there were 80 people, 37 households, and 19 families living in the village. The population density was 294.6 inhabitants per square mile (113.7/km^{2}). There were 45 housing units at an average density of 165.7 per square mile (64.0/km^{2}). The racial makeup of the village was 97.50% White, 1.25% Native American, and 1.25% from two or more races.

There were 37 households, out of which 32.4% had children under the age of 18 living with them, 37.8% were married couples living together, 10.8% had a female householder with no husband present, and 48.6% were non-families. 40.5% of all households were made up of individuals, and 13.5% had someone living alone who was 65 years of age or older. The average household size was 2.16 and the average family size was 2.95.

In the village, the population was spread out, with 23.8% under the age of 18, 10.0% from 18 to 24, 30.0% from 25 to 44, 22.5% from 45 to 64, and 13.8% who were 65 years of age or older. The median age was 38 years. For every 100 females, there were 105.1 males. For every 100 females age 18 and over, there were 110.3 males.

The median income for a household in the village was $30,000, and the median income for a family was $43,750. Males had a median income of $21,875 versus $18,125 for females. The per capita income for the village was $13,620. There were no families and 8.4% of the population living below the poverty line, including no under eighteens and 11.8% of those over 64.

== Education ==
Climax Springs R-IV School District operates one elementary school and Climax Springs High School.

Climax Springs has a public library, a branch of the Camden County Library District.
