= Camden County, Missouri =

County in Missouri, United States

- County
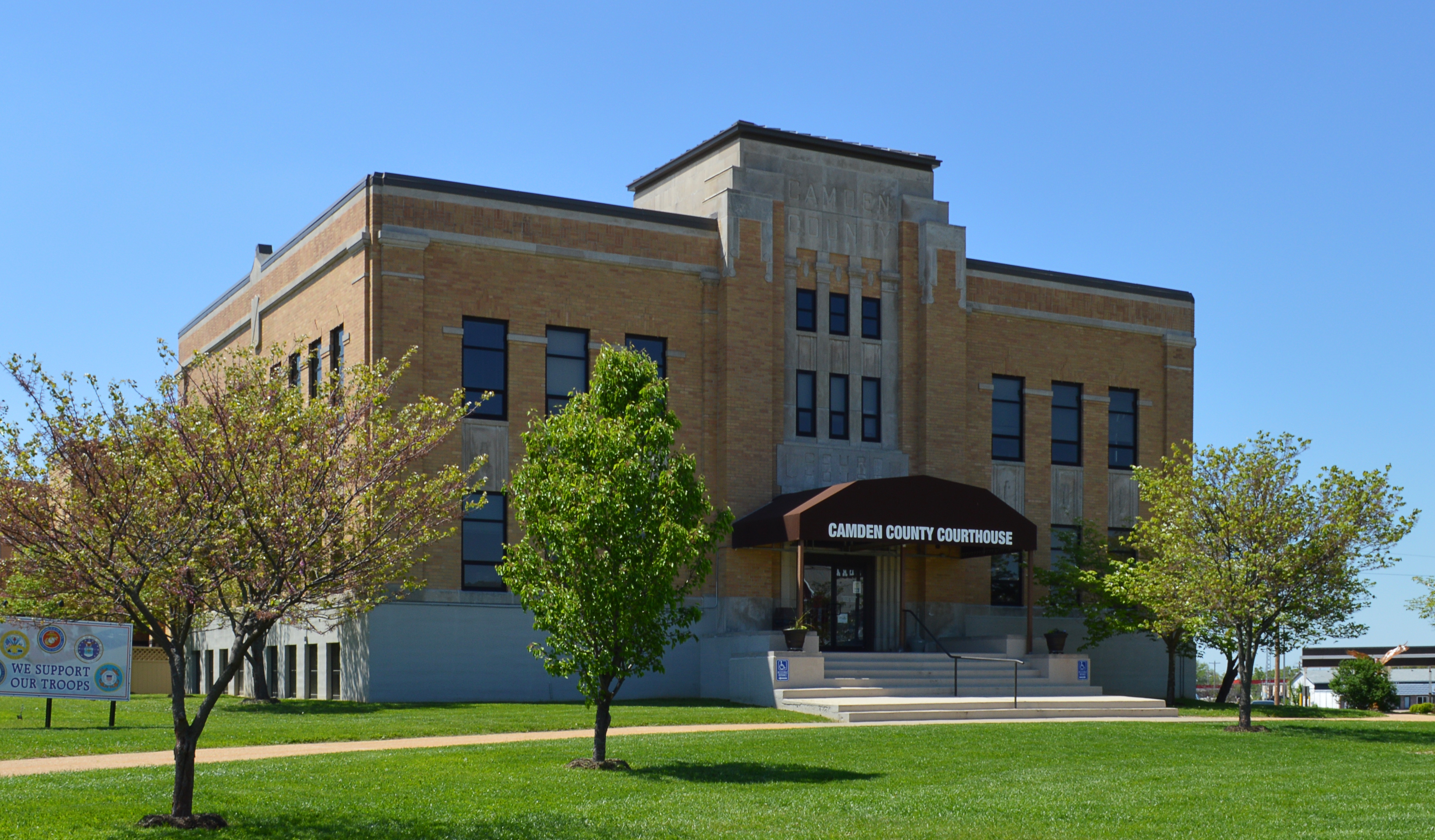
- The Camden County Courthouse in Camdenton

- Location within the U.S. state of Missouri
- Coordinates: 38°02′N 92°46′W
- Country: United States
- State: Missouri
- Founded: January 29, 1841
- Named for: Charles Pratt, 1st Earl Camden
- Seat: Camdenton
- Largest city: Osage Beach

Area
  - Total: 709 sq mi (1,840 km^{2})
  - Land: 656 sq mi (1,700 km^{2})
  - Water: 53 sq mi (140 km^{2}) 7.4%

Population (2020)
  - Total: 42,745
  - Estimate (2025): 44,047 ▲
  - Density: 65.2/sq mi (25.2/km^{2})
- Time zone: UTC−6 (Central)
  - Summer (DST): UTC−5 (CDT)
- Congressional districts: 3rd, 4th
- Website: camdencountymo.gov

Camden County is a county located in the U.S. state of Missouri. As of the 2020 Census, the population was 42,745. Its county seat is Camdenton. The county was organized on January 29, 1841, as Kinderhook County and renamed Camden County in 1843 after Charles Pratt, 1st Earl Camden, Lord Chancellor of the United Kingdom and leader of the British Whig Party. Camden County is also the primary setting of the Netflix show Ozark.

== History ==
=== Settlement and founding ===
There is no preserved record of the area that is now Camden County being inhabited before 1827, when Kentuckian settlers Harrison Davis and Reuben Berry pitched a camp on the Dry Auglaize Creek, eight miles east of what is now Linn Creek. Throughout the next few years, more settlers came into the area, and by 1831, there were thirteen families living near the Dry Auglaize. Records of settling the Wet Auglaize Creek date back to the beginning of 1832. The first school in Camden County was built on a farm in 1833.

=== Original county seat ===
The town of Oregon was established in 1841 and became the county seat. In 1843, when the name of the county was changed from Kinderhook to Camden, the name of Oregon was changed to Erie. In 1854, a cholera epidemic struck Erie, leaving only 7 survivors. As a result, the county seat was changed to Linn Creek in 1855.

=== American Civil War ===
Camden County saw some fighting during the American Civil War.

==== Battle of Monday's Hollow ====
Battle of Monday's Hollow
- Part of the American Civil War
Date	October 13, 1861
Location	Camden County, Missouri
Result	Union victory

Belligerents
United States	Missouri State Guard

Commanders and leaders
(United States) Col. John Wyman; (United States) Maj. Clark Wright; (United States) Maj. W.D. Bowen	Lt. Col. J.M. Johnson

Units involved
(United States) 13th Illinois Infantry Regiment (United States) 13th Illinois Cavalry Regiment: Frémont Battalion; First Battalion	Unnamed cavalry unit

Casualties and losses
1 killed	Approximately 100 killed and wounded

On October 13, 1861, the Battle of Monday's Hollow took place. Colonel John Wyman led the 13th Illinois Infantry Regiment from the east towards Linn Creek, while the 13th Illinois Cavalry Regiment, consisting of Major Clark Wright's Frémont Battalion and Major W.D. Bowen's First Battalion headed southwest towards Lebanon. Bowen's forces collided with a Missouri State Guard cavalry unit commanded by Lieutenant Colonel J.M. "Myscal" Johnson. Bowen called for assistance from Wright and Wyman, halting near where Missouri Route 7 now crosses Murphy Creek. The Union forces saw Johnson's cavalry, and Wyman attacked, driving the Missouri State Guard in the direction of Lebanon.

==== Skirmish at Linn Creek ====
Wyman remained in his camp for several days after the Battle of Monday's Hollow. Southern partisans took control of an undefended Linn Creek. On October 14, 1861, the Frémont Battalion descended on the town and drove out the southerners, taking 37 prisoners.

== Geography ==
According to the U.S. Census Bureau, the county has a total area of 709 square miles (1,840 km^{2}), of which 656 square miles (1,700 km^{2}) is land and 53 square miles (140 km^{2}) (7.4%) is water.

=== Adjacent counties ===
- Morgan County (north)
- Miller County (northeast)
- Pulaski County (east)
- Laclede County (southeast)
- Dallas County (southwest)
- Hickory County (west)
- Benton County (northwest)

=== Major highways ===
- U.S. Route 54
- Route 5
- Route 7
- Route 134
- Route 242

== Demographics ==
Historical population
Census	Pop.	Note	%±
1850	2,338		—
1860	4,975		112.8%
1870	6,108		22.8%
1880	7,266		19.0%
1890	10,040		38.2%
1900	13,113		30.6%
1910	11,582		−11.7%
1920	10,474		−9.6%
1930	9,142		−12.7%
1940	8,971		−1.9%
1950	7,861		−12.4%
1960	9,116		16.0%
1970	13,315		46.1%
1980	20,017		50.3%
1990	27,495		37.4%
2000	37,051		34.8%
2010	44,002		18.8%
2020	42,745		−2.9%
2025 (est.)	44,047	▲	3.0%
U.S. Decennial Census; 1790-1960 1900-1990; 1990-2000 2010-2015

Camden County, Missouri – Racial and ethnic composition Note: the US Census treats Hispanic/Latino as an ethnic category. This table excludes Latinos from the racial categories and assigns them to a separate category. Hispanics/Latinos may be of any race.
Race / Ethnicity (NH = Non-Hispanic)	Pop 1980	Pop 1990	Pop 2000	Pop 2010	Pop 2020	% 1980	% 1990	% 2000	% 2010	% 2020
White alone (NH)	19,749	27,120	35,954	41,913	38,714	98.66%	98.64%	97.04%	95.25%	90.57%
Black or African American alone (NH)	30	57	94	170	247	0.15%	0.21%	0.25%	0.39%	0.58%
Native American or Alaska Native alone (NH)	61	101	168	199	177	0.30%	0.37%	0.45%	0.45%	0.41%
Asian alone (NH)	36	45	107	175	221	0.18%	0.16%	0.29%	0.40%	0.52%
Native Hawaiian or Pacific Islander alone (NH)	x	x	14	7	28	x	x	0.04%	0.02%	0.07%
Other race alone (NH)	10	2	20	22	128	0.05%	0.01%	0.05%	0.05%	0.30%
Mixed race or Multiracial (NH)	x	x	348	502	1,875	x	x	0.94%	1.14%	4.39%
Hispanic or Latino (any race)	131	170	346	1,014	1,355	0.65%	0.62%	0.93%	2.30%	3.17%
Total	20,017	27,495	37,051	44,002	42,745	100.00%	100.00%	100.00%	100.00%	100.00%

=== 2020 census ===
As of the 2020 census, the county had a population of 42,745. The median age was 51.6 years. 18.2% of residents were under the age of 18 and 27.5% of residents were 65 years of age or older. For every 100 females there were 99.2 males, and for every 100 females age 18 and over there were 97.7 males age 18 and over.

The racial makeup of the county was 91.5% White, 0.6% Black or African American, 0.5% American Indian and Alaska Native, 0.5% Asian, 0.1% Native Hawaiian and Pacific Islander, 1.2% from some other race, and 5.6% from two or more races. Hispanic or Latino residents of any race comprised 3.2% of the population.

43.7% of residents lived in urban areas, while 56.3% lived in rural areas.

There were 18,617 households in the county, of which 21.7% had children under the age of 18 living with them and 21.4% had a female householder with no spouse or partner present. About 27.5% of all households were made up of individuals and 13.6% had someone living alone who was 65 years of age or older.

There were 39,473 housing units, of which 52.8% were vacant. Among occupied housing units, 79.4% were owner-occupied and 20.6% were renter-occupied. The homeowner vacancy rate was 2.7% and the rental vacancy rate was 18.5%.

=== 2000 census ===
As of the 2000 census, there were 37,051 people, 15,779 households, and 11,297 families residing in the county. The population density was 57 people per square mile (22 people/km^{2}). There were 33,470 housing units at an average density of 51 units per square mile (20/km^{2}). The racial makeup of the county was 97.68% White, 0.26% Black or African American, 0.49% Native American, 0.29% Asian, 0.04% Pacific Islander, 0.22% from other races, and 1.03% from two or more races. Approximately 0.93% of the population were Hispanic or Latino of any race.

There were 15,779 households, out of which 23.80% had children under the age of 18 living with them, 61.80% were married couples living together, 6.60% had a female householder with no husband present, and 28.40% were non-families. 23.30% of all households were made up of individuals, and 9.50% had someone living alone who was 65 years of age or older. The average household size was 2.31 and the average family size was 2.68.

In the county, the population was spread out, with 20.30% under the age of 18, 6.10% from 18 to 24, 23.30% from 25 to 44, 31.40% from 45 to 64, and 19.00% who were 65 years of age or older. The median age was 45 years. For every 100 females there were 100.00 males. For every 100 females age 18 and over, there were 97.50 males.

The median income for a household in the county was $35,840, and the median income for a family was $40,695. Males had a median income of $28,020 versus $20,825 for females. The per capita income for the county was $20,197. About 8.00% of families and 11.40% of the population were below the poverty line, including 17.00% of those under age 18 and 7.70% of those age 65 or over.

=== Religion ===
According to the Association of Religion Data Archives County Membership Report (2010), Camden County is part of the Bible Belt, with evangelical Protestantism being the most predominant religion. The most predominant denominations among residents in Camden County who adhere to a religion are Southern Baptists (33.09%), nondenominational evangelical groups (13.92%), and Roman Catholics (11.44%).

== Education ==
=== Public schools ===
- Camdenton R-III School District – Camdenton
  - Dogwood Elementary School (PK-02)
  - Hawthorn Elementary School (03–04)
  - Osage Beach Elementary School (PK-04)
  - Hurricane Deck Elementary School (PK-04)
  - Oak Ridge Intermediate School (05–06)
  - Camdenton Middle School (07–08)
  - Camdenton High School (09–12)
- Climax Springs R-IV School District – Climax Springs
  - Climax Springs Elementary School (K-06)
  - Climax Springs High School (07–12)
- Macks Creek R-V School District – Macks Creek
  - Macks Creek Elementary School (PK-06)
  - Macks Creek High School (07–12)
- Stoutland R-II School District – Stoutland
  - Stoutland Elementary School (PK-06)
  - Stoutland High School (07–12)

=== Private schools ===
- Lake Christian Academy - Sunrise Beach (PK-12) - Nondenominational Christian

=== Public libraries ===
- Camden County Library District

== Communities ==
=== Cities ===
- Camdenton (county seat)
- Lake Ozark (mostly in Miller County)
- Linn Creek
- Osage Beach (largest city, also in Miller County)
- Richland (mostly in Pulaski County and a small part in Laclede County)

=== Villages ===
- Friedenswald
- Stoutland
- Sunrise Beach
- Village of Four Seasons

=== Census-designated places ===
- Climax Springs
- Macks Creek
- Montreal

=== Other unincorporated places ===
- Bannister
- Barnumton
- Branch
- Damsel
- Decaturville
- Edith
- Green Bay Terrace
- Hugo
- Hurricane Deck
- Neongwah
- Passover
- Purvis
- Roach
- Sagrada
- Toronto
- Wet Glaize

== Notable people ==
- Joseph W. McClurg, Governor of Missouri (1869–1871) and U.S. Representative from Missouri (1863–1868)

== Politics ==
=== Local ===
The Republican Party predominantly controls politics at the local level in Camden County.

Camden County, Missouri

Elected countywide officials
Assessor	Marty McGuire	Republican
Auditor	Jimmy Laughlin	Republican
Circuit Clerk	Kayla Henry	Republican
County Clerk	Rowland Todd	Republican
Collector	Teresa Murray	Republican
Commissioner (presiding)	Ike Skelton	Republican
Commissioner (district 1)	James Gohagan	Republican
Commissioner (district 2)	Steve Dougan	Republican
Prosecuting Attorney	Richelle Christensen-Grosvenor	Republican
Public Administrator	Thomas Gorsline	Republican
Recorder	Donnie Snelling	Republican
Sheriff	Chris Edgar	Republican
Treasurer	Kendra Hicks	Republican

=== State ===
Past gubernatorial election results
Year	Republican	Democratic	Third Parties
2024	75.95% 19,104	21.94% 5,519	2.11% 532
2020	76.18% 18,837	22.08% 5,461	1.74% 430
2016	67.09% 15,050	29.80% 6,686	3.11% 698
2012	54.91% 11,986	42.19% 9,210	2.90% 632
2008	48.79% 10,716	49.15% 10,795	2.06% 453
2004	61.18% 11,956	37.87% 7,401	0.95% 184
2000	56.24% 9,555	41.55% 7,059	2.21% 376
1996	50.25% 7,385	46.34% 6,810	3.42% 502

Camden County is split between two legislative districts that elect members of the Missouri House of Representatives, both of which are represented by Republicans.

- District 123 — Suzie Pollock (R-Lebanon). Consists of the southern half of the county, including the communities of Camdenton, Linn Creek, Macks Creek, and Stoutland.

Missouri House of Representatives — District 123 — Camden County (2020)
Party	Candidate	Votes	%	±%
Republican	Suzie Pollock	9,459	87.16%	+11.25
Constitution	Pat Bellew	1,394	12.84%	+12.84

Missouri House of Representatives — District 123 — Camden County (2018)
Party	Candidate	Votes	%	±%
Republican	Suzie Pollock	6,920	75.91%	−24.09
Democratic	Joe Register	2,196	24.09%	+24.09

- District 124 — Lisa Thomas (R-Lake Ozark). Consists of the northern half of the county, including the communities of Climax Springs, Lake Ozark, Osage Beach, Sunrise Beach, and Village of Four Seasons.

Missouri House of Representatives — District 124 — Camden County (2020)
Party	Candidate	Votes	%	±%
Republican	Lisa Thomas	11,287	100.00%	−24.18

Missouri House of Representatives — District 124 — Camden County (2018)
Party	Candidate	Votes	%	±%
Republican	Rocky Miller	7,971	75.82%	−24.18
Democratic	Steve Dakopolos	2,542	24.18%	+24.18

All of Camden County is a part of Missouri's 16th District in the Missouri Senate and is currently represented by Justin Brown (R-Rolla).

Missouri Senate — District 16 — Camden County (2018)
Party	Candidate	Votes	%	±%
Republican	Justin Brown	14,356	73.37%	−26.63
Democratic	Ryan Dillon	5,211	26.63%	+26.63

Missouri Senate — District 16 — Camden County (2014)
Party	Candidate	Votes	%	±%
Republican	Dan Brown	8,760	100.00%	

=== Federal ===
Most of Camden County is included in Missouri's 3rd Congressional District and is currently represented by Blaine Luetkemeyer (R-St. Elizabeth) in the U.S. House of Representatives. Luetkemeyer was elected to a seventh term in 2020 over Democratic challenger Megan Rezabek.

U.S. House of Representatives — Missouri's 3rd Congressional District — Camden County (2020)
Party	Candidate	Votes	%	±%
Republican	Blaine Luetkemeyer	11,652	77.57%	+2.21
Democratic	Megan Rezabek	3,122	20.78%	−2.12
Libertarian	Leonard J. Steinman II	248	1.65%	−0.10

U.S. House of Representatives — Missouri's 3rd Congressional District — Camden County (2018)
Party	Candidate	Votes	%	±%
Republican	Blaine Luetkemeyer	9,051	75.36%	−0.36
Democratic	Katy Geppert	2,750	22.90%	+1.95
Libertarian	Donald V. Stolle	210	1.75%	−0.90

Part of Camden County is included in Missouri's 4th Congressional District and is currently represented by Vicky Hartzler (R-Harrisonville) in the U.S. House of Representatives. Hartzler was elected to a sixth term in 2020 over Democratic challenger Lindsey Simmons.

U.S. House of Representatives — Missouri's 4th Congressional District — Camden County (2020)
Party	Candidate	Votes	%	±%
Republican	Vicky Hartzler	7,270	78.03%	+1.57
Democratic	Lindsey Simmons	1,809	19.42%	−1.98
Libertarian	Steven K. Koonse	238	2.55%	+0.41

U.S. House of Representatives — Missouri's 4th Congressional District — Camden County (2018)
Party	Candidate	Votes	%	±%
Republican	Vicky Hartzler	5,980	76.46%	−0.22
Democratic	Renee Hoagenson	1,674	21.40%	+1.72
Libertarian	Mark Bliss	167	2.14%	−1.50

Camden County, along with the rest of the state of Missouri, is represented in the U.S. Senate by Josh Hawley (R-Columbia) and Roy Blunt (R-Strafford).

U.S. Senate – Class I – Camden County (2018)
Party	Candidate	Votes	%	±%
Republican	Josh Hawley	13,995	69.94%	+20.15
Democratic	Claire McCaskill	5,425	27.11%	−15.86
Independent	Craig O'Dear	299	1.49%	
Libertarian	Japheth Campbell	294	1.02%	−6.20
Green	Jo Crain	87	0.44%	+0.44

Blunt was elected to a second term in 2016 over then-Missouri Secretary of State Jason Kander.

U.S. Senate — Missouri — Camden County (2016)
Party	Candidate	Votes	%	±%
Republican	Roy Blunt	14,434	64.36%	+14.57
Democratic	Jason Kander	6,995	31.19%	−11.78
Libertarian	Jonathan Dine	580	2.59%	−4.63
Constitution	Fred Ryman	210	0.94%	+0.94
Green	Johnathan McFarland	208	0.93%	+0.93

==== Political culture ====
United States presidential election results for Camden County, Missouri
Year	Republican		Democratic		Third party(ies)	
Year	No.	%	No.	%	No.	%
1888	1,056	53.99%	675	34.51%	225	11.50%
1892	1,070	53.99%	602	30.37%	310	15.64%
1896	1,326	50.40%	1,287	48.92%	18	0.68%
1900	1,511	58.14%	1,078	41.48%	10	0.38%
1904	1,466	60.23%	883	36.28%	85	3.49%
1908	1,446	58.90%	955	38.90%	54	2.20%
1912	918	49.12%	667	35.69%	284	15.20%
1916	1,261	56.17%	930	41.43%	54	2.41%
1920	2,276	67.96%	1,034	30.87%	39	1.16%
1924	1,732	57.14%	1,196	39.46%	103	3.40%
1928	2,085	77.37%	606	22.49%	4	0.15%
1932	1,497	45.19%	1,801	54.36%	15	0.45%
1936	2,281	54.37%	1,908	45.48%	6	0.14%
1940	2,692	63.40%	1,549	36.48%	5	0.12%
1944	2,180	68.66%	990	31.18%	5	0.16%
1948	2,020	61.38%	1,264	38.41%	7	0.21%
1952	2,789	69.29%	1,226	30.46%	10	0.25%
1956	2,817	65.86%	1,460	34.14%	0	0.00%
1960	3,509	66.61%	1,759	33.39%	0	0.00%
1964	2,607	50.83%	2,522	49.17%	0	0.00%
1968	3,500	61.00%	1,605	27.97%	633	11.03%
1972	4,996	73.94%	1,761	26.06%	0	0.00%
1976	4,469	52.51%	3,975	46.71%	66	0.78%
1980	6,541	63.84%	3,416	33.34%	289	2.82%
1984	8,057	72.29%	3,088	27.71%	0	0.00%
1988	7,773	66.10%	3,930	33.42%	56	0.48%
1992	5,554	37.97%	5,140	35.14%	3,933	26.89%
1996	7,190	48.93%	5,566	37.88%	1,938	13.19%
2000	10,358	60.58%	6,323	36.98%	418	2.44%
2004	13,122	67.23%	6,296	32.26%	101	0.52%
2008	14,074	63.40%	7,773	35.02%	350	1.58%
2012	15,092	68.55%	6,458	29.33%	465	2.11%
2016	16,944	74.71%	4,768	21.02%	968	4.27%
2020	18,850	75.97%	5,652	22.78%	310	1.25%
2024	19,597	76.71%	5,724	22.40%	227	0.89%

Camden County has long been a Republican stronghold. The last Democrat to carry the county was Franklin D. Roosevelt in 1932, the only time a Democrat has won the county since Stephen Douglas in 1860. Underlining how Republican the county is, it rejected native son Harry Truman in 1944 when he was Roosevelt's running mate, and when he headed the ticket himself in 1948. Jimmy Carter is the only Democrat since Lyndon B. Johnson to manage even 40 percent of the county's vote.

Like most rural areas in western Missouri, voters in Camden County generally adhere to socially and culturally conservative principles which tend to influence their Republican leanings.

=== Missouri presidential preference primaries ===
==== 2020 ====
The 2020 presidential primaries for both the Democratic and Republican parties were held in Missouri on March 10. On the Democratic side, former Vice President Joe Biden (D-Delaware) both won statewide and carried Camden County by a wide margin. Biden went on to defeat President Donald Trump in the general election.

Missouri Democratic Presidential Primary – Camden County (2020)
Party	Candidate	Votes	%	±%
Democratic	Joe Biden	2,101	69.14	
Democratic	Bernie Sanders	756	24.88	
Democratic	Tulsi Gabbard	34	1.12	
Democratic	Others/Uncommitted	148	4.87	

Incumbent President Donald Trump (R-Florida) faced a primary challenge from former Massachusetts Governor Bill Weld, but won both Camden County and statewide by overwhelming margins.

Missouri Republican Presidential Primary – Camden County (2020)
Party	Candidate	Votes	%	±%
Republican	Donald Trump	3,564	97.94	
Republican	Bill Weld	14	0.39	
Republican	Others/Uncommitted	61	1.68	

==== 2016 ====
The 2016 presidential primaries for both the Republican and Democratic parties were held in Missouri on March 15. Businessman Donald Trump (R-New York) narrowly won the state overall, but carried a majority of the vote in Camden County. He went on to win the presidency.

Missouri Republican Presidential Primary – Camden County (2016)
Party	Candidate	Votes	%	±%
Republican	Donald Trump	5,467	54.88	
Republican	Ted Cruz	2,985	29.97	
Republican	John Kasich	846	8.49	
Republican	Marco Rubio	473	4.75	
Republican	Others/Uncommitted	190	1.91	

On the Democratic side, former Secretary of State Hillary Clinton (D-New York) narrowly won statewide, but Senator Bernie Sanders (I-Vermont) carried Camden County by a small margin.

Missouri Democratic Presidential Primary – Camden County (2016)
Party	Candidate	Votes	%	±%
Democratic	Bernie Sanders	1,419	49.95	
Democratic	Hillary Clinton	1,388	48.86	
Democratic	Others/Uncommitted	34	1.20	

==== 2012 ====
The 2012 Missouri Republican Presidential Primary's results were nonbinding on the state's national convention delegates. Voters in Camden County supported former U.S. Senator Rick Santorum (R-Pennsylvania), who finished first in the state at large, but eventually lost the nomination to former Governor Mitt Romney (R-Massachusetts). Delegates to the congressional district and state conventions were chosen at a county caucus, which selected a delegation favoring Santorum. Incumbent President Barack Obama easily won the Missouri Democratic Primary and renomination. He defeated Romney in the general election.

==== 2008 ====
In 2008, the Missouri Republican Presidential Primary was closely contested, with Senator John McCain (R-Arizona) prevailing and eventually winning the nomination.

Missouri Republican Presidential Primary – Camden County (2008)
Party	Candidate	Votes	%	±%
Republican	John McCain	2,196	33.92	
Republican	Mike Huckabee	2,133	32.94	
Republican	Mitt Romney	1,843	28.46	
Republican	Ron Paul	194	3.00	
Republican	Others/Uncommitted	109	1.69	

Then-Senator Hillary Clinton (D-New York) received more votes than any candidate from either party in Camden County during the 2008 presidential primary. Despite initial reports that Clinton had won Missouri, Barack Obama (D-Illinois), also a Senator at the time, narrowly defeated her statewide and later became that year's Democratic nominee, going on to win the presidency.

Missouri Democratic Presidential Primary – Camden County (2008)
Party	Candidate	Votes	%	±%
Democratic	Hillary Clinton	2,794	57.99	
Democratic	Barack Obama	1,867	38.75	
Democratic	Others/Uncommitted	157	3.26	

== See also ==
- National Register of Historic Places listings in Camden County, Missouri
