= Camdenton, Missouri =

City in Missouri, U.S.

- City
- City of Camdenton
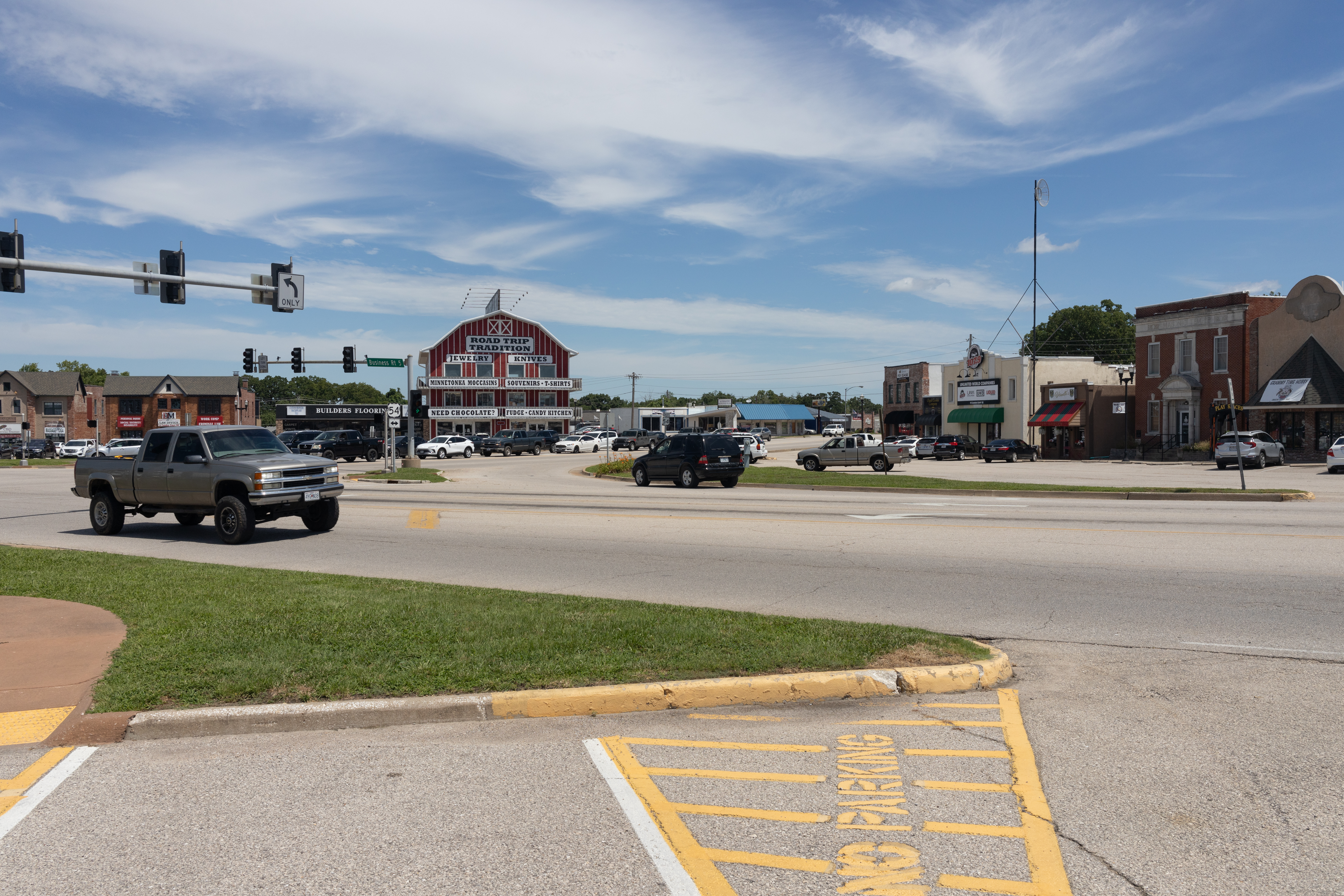
- Camdenton Town Square
- Interactive map of Camdenton, Missouri
- Coordinates: 38°0′32″N 92°44′47″W
- Country: United States
- State: Missouri
- County: Camden
- Founded: 1931

Government
  - Type: Mayor/Administrator/Board of Aldermen
  - Mayor: John McNabb
  - Administrator: J. Jeff Hancock
  - City Clerk: Renée Kingston

Area
  - Total: 5.49 sq mi (14.23 km^{2})
  - Land: 5.49 sq mi (14.22 km^{2})
  - Water: 0.0039 sq mi (0.01 km^{2})
- Elevation: 1,017 ft (310 m)

Population (2020)
  - Total: 3,960
  - Estimate (2023): 4,134
  - Density: 721.1/sq mi (278.42/km^{2})
- Time zone: UTC-6 (Central (CST))
  - Summer (DST): UTC-5 (CDT)
- ZIP code: 65020
- Area code: 573
- FIPS code: 29-10810
- GNIS feature ID: 2393511
- Website: City of Camdenton

Camdenton is a city in and the county seat of Camden County, Missouri, United States. As of the 2020 census, Camdenton had a population of 3,960. The city is enveloped by the Lower Niangua arm of the Lake of the Ozarks, and serves as a popular trade point for visitors to the area.

== History ==
Camdenton, the new county seat, had its start in the 1930s, when construction of the Lake of the Ozarks inundated the old county seat of Linn Creek. The city derives its name from Camden County. The name Camdenton was chosen because there were no other cities with that name. A post office called Camdenton has been in operation since 1931.

The city was platted in 1930 by Clint Webb and Jim Banner, under the direction of John T. Woodruff on a 160-acre plot of land at the intersection of U.S. Route 54 and Missouri Route 5. It was originally planned for a map of the streets to look like a wagon wheel.

== Geography ==
Camdenton is located at 38°0′32″N 92°44′47″W (38.008890, -92.746484). According to the United States Census Bureau, the city has a total area of 5.48 square miles (14.19 km^{2}), all land. Camdenton is 1,043 feet (318 m) above sea level.

== Demographics ==
Historical population
Census	Pop.	Note	%±
1940	893		—
1950	1,142		27.9%
1960	1,405		23.0%
1970	1,636		16.4%
1980	2,303		40.8%
1990	2,561		11.2%
2000	2,779		8.5%
2010	3,718		33.8%
2020	3,960		6.5%
U.S. Decennial Census

=== 2020 census ===
As of the 2020 census, Camdenton had a population of 3,960. The median age was 35.5 years. 27.7% of residents were under the age of 18 and 15.6% of residents were 65 years of age or older. For every 100 females there were 93.5 males, and for every 100 females age 18 and over there were 87.6 males age 18 and over.

94.5% of residents lived in urban areas, while 5.5% lived in rural areas.

There were 1,531 households in Camdenton, of which 37.8% had children under the age of 18 living in them. Of all households, 39.3% were married-couple households, 18.4% were households with a male householder and no spouse or partner present, and 31.9% were households with a female householder and no spouse or partner present. About 29.9% of all households were made up of individuals and 13.6% had someone living alone who was 65 years of age or older.

There were 1,664 housing units, of which 8.0% were vacant. The homeowner vacancy rate was 2.2% and the rental vacancy rate was 5.6%.

Racial composition as of the 2020 census
Race	Number	Percent
White	3,425	86.5%
Black or African American	45	1.1%
American Indian and Alaska Native	25	0.6%
Asian	21	0.5%
Native Hawaiian and Other Pacific Islander	5	0.1%
Some other race	110	2.8%
Two or more races	329	8.3%
Hispanic or Latino (of any race)	248	6.3%

=== 2010 census ===
As of the census of 2010, 3,718 people, 1,441 households, and 901 families were living in the city. The population density was 678.5 inhabitants per square mile (262.0/km^{2}). Th 1,591 housing units had an average density of 290.3/sq mi (112.1/km^{2}). The racial makeup of the city was 95.0% White, 0.3% African American, 0.4% Native American, 0.5% Asian, 1.4% from other races, and 2.3% from two or more races. Hispanics or Latinos of any race were 3.7% of the population.

Of the 1,441 households, 36.8% had children under 18 living with them, 39.9% were married couples living together, 18.2% had a female householder with no husband present, 4.4% had a male householder with no wife present, and 37.5% were not families. About 31.0% of all households were made up of individuals, and 15.0% had someone living alone who was 65 or older. The average household size was 2.47, and the average family size was 3.07.

The median age in the city was 32.3 years; 28.1% of residents were under 18; 10.2% were between 18 and 24; 26.2% were 25 to 44; 21.8% were 45 to 64; and 13.8% were 65 or older. The gender makeup of the city was 47.3% male and 52.7% female.

=== 2000 census ===
As of the census of 2000, 2,779 people, 1,149 households, and 708 families resided in the city. The population density was 795.3 people/sq mi (307.4/km^{2}). The 1,283 housing units had an average density of 367.2/sq mi (141.9/km^{2}). The racial makeup of the city was 95.65% White, 0.18% African American, 0.90% Native American, 0.76% Asian, 0.14% Pacific Islander, 0.50% from other races, and 1.87% from two or more races. Hispanics or Latino of any race were 2.16% of the population.

Of the 1,149 households, 34.2% had children under 18 living with them, 40.4% were married couples living together, 16.4% had a female householder with no husband present, and 38.3% were not families. About 33.5% of all households were made up of individuals, and 17.3% had someone living alone who was 65or older. The average household size was 2.35, and the average family size was 2.99.

In the city, the age distribution was 27.6% under 18, 9.7% from 18 to 24, 28.4% from 25 to 44, 18.9% from 45 to 64, and 15.3% who were 65 or older. The median age was 34 years. For every 100 females, there were 90.0 males. For every 100 females 18 and over, there were 80.7 males.

The median income for a household in the city was $26,649, and for a family was $29,342. Males had a median income of $25,156 versus $20,431 for females. The per capita income for the city was $14,040. About 15.2% of families and 17.1% of the population were below the poverty line, including 21.8% of those under age 18 and 16.3% of those age 65 or over.

=== April 1932 report ===
In April 1932, The Reveille, a local newspaper, reported that the town had 67 dwellings, 2 churches, a Masonic lodge, a court house, a high school, 2 hotels, 2 cafes, 2 barber shops, 2 garages, 4 general stores, an ice plant, a drugstore, a bank, a newspaper, an airport, a lumber yard, a jewelry store, an electric shop, an abstract and tile company, and nine other businesses.

== Media ==
KCVO-FM is a noncommercial FM radio station whose frequency is 91.7 mHz. Its programming consists of Christian music and talk. It is the flagship station for Spirit FM, a network of stations in Missouri owned by Lake Area Educational Broadcasting Foundation.

The Lake Sun is a semiweekly newspaper covering the Lake of the Ozarks, owned by Vernon Publishing.

== Education ==
Camdenton R-III School District operates public elementary schools, Camdenton Middle School, and Camdenton High School. Camdenton is home to a FIRST Robotics Competition program named FIRST LASER.

Camdenton has a public library, a branch of the Camden County Library District.

== Arts and culture ==
Camdenton offers some Lake of the Ozarks accommodations, including boating and fishing year-round. Each June, the city serves as Time Station 32 in the Race Across America, the annual ultramarathon cross country 3,000-mile nonstop bicycle race starting in Oceanside, California, and ending in Annapolis, Maryland. The Camdenton Memorial Airport host an air show every September.

== Transportation ==
Camdenton is served by U.S. Route 54, which intersects Missouri Route 5 and 7. Missouri Route 5 and 7 share a concurrency throughout the city. Camdenton has an airport named Camdenton Memorial Airport.

== Tourism ==
Camdenton is located near two tourist attractions: Bridal Cave and Ha Ha Tonka State Park.

== See also ==
- List of cities in Missouri
