= List of townships in Missouri =

Missouri townships
- Map of the 1,378 townships in Missouri
- Category: Lower-level administrative division
- Location: Missouri
- Number: 1,378
- Populations: 17 (Benton Township) – 183,073 (Kaw Township)
- Areas: 1.3 square miles (3.4 km^{2}) (Center Township) – 246.5 square miles (638 km^{2}) (Eminence Township)
- Government: Township government

In the 20 highlighted counties, townships have governments, while in other counties they are only geographical areas without township governments.

The U.S. state of Missouri is divided into 1,378 townships in 114 counties.

In Missouri, only counties of the third and fourth classes, which are those with a total assessed valuation under $450,000,000, may have township governments, but are not required to. As of 2021, 20 of the 114 Missouri counties had township governments, containing 285 townships. Township governments are considered subcounty general purpose governments, but not municipal governments. Townships in the other Missouri counties are geographical areas only, without township governments.

Township	County
Adair	Camden
Adams	Harrison
Adams	DeKalb
Agency	Buchanan
Airport	St. Louis
Alexander	Benton
Allen	Worth
Alpine	Stone
Anderson East	McDonald
Anderson West	McDonald
Anderson	New Madrid
Apple Creek	Cape Girardeau
Appleton	St. Clair
Arcadia	Iron
Arlington	Phelps
Arnold	Jefferson
Arrow Rock	Saline
Ash Hill	Butler
Ash	Barry
Ashley	Pike
Atchison	Clinton
Atchison	Nodaway
Athens	Gentry
Auglaize	Laclede
Auglaize	Camden
Aurora	Lawrence
Austin	Cass
Auxvasse	Callaway
Bacon	Vernon
Badger	Vernon
Baker	Linn
Barren Fork	Ozark
Bartlett	Shannon
Barton City	Barton
Bayou I	Ozark
Bayou II	Ozark
Bear Creek	Henry
Bear Creek	Montgomery
Beauvais	Ste. Genevieve
Beaver Dam	Butler
Beaver	Taney
Bedford	Lincoln
Bee Branch	Chariton
Bee Ridge	Knox
Belgrade	Washington
Bellevue	Washington
Benton	Daviess
Benton	Osage
Benton	Cedar
Benton	Wayne
Benton	Crawford
Benton	Holt
Benton	Adair
Benton	Newton
Benton	Andrew
Benton	Howell
Benton	Linn
Benton	Douglas
Benton	Atchison
Benton	Knox
Berwick	Newton
Bethany	Harrison
Bethel	Shelby
Bethlehem	Henry
Bevier	Macon
Big Apple	Oregon
Big Creek	Cass
Big Creek	Henry
Big Creek	Ozark
Big Creek	Taney
Big Creek	Madison
Big Prairie	New Madrid
Big River	St. Francois
Big River	Jefferson
Bigelow	Holt
Billmore	Oregon
Birch Tree	Shannon
Black Creek	Shelby
Black Pond	Oregon
Black River	Wayne
Black River	Reynolds
Black River	Butler
Blackwater	Saline
Blackwater	Cooper
Blackwater	Pettis
Blanchette	St. Charles
Bloomington	Buchanan
Blue Mound	Livingston
Blue Mound	Vernon
Blue	Jackson
Boeuf	Gasconade
Boeuf	Franklin
Bogard	Henry
Bogle	Gentry
Bois Brule	Perry
Boles	Franklin
Bonhomme	St. Louis
Bonne Femme	Howard
Boone No. 1	Greene
Boone No. 2	Greene
Boone	Maries
Boone	Douglas
Boone	Franklin
Boone	St. Charles
Boone	Crawford
Boone	Texas
Boone	Wright
Boonslick	Howard
Boonville	Cooper
Boulware	Gasconade
Bourbois	Gasconade
Bourbon	Knox
Bourbon	Callaway
Bourbon	Boone
Bowlan	Shannon
Bowling Green	Chariton
Bowling Green	Pettis
Bowman	Sullivan
Box	Cedar
Braggadocio	Pemiscot
Branson	Taney
Brazeau	Perry
Breckenridge	Caldwell
Breton	Washington
Bridgeport	Warren
Bridges	Ozark
Brookfield	Linn
Brooking	Jackson
Brookline	Greene
Brown	Douglas
Bruner	Christian
Brunswick	Chariton
Brush Creek	Gasconade
Brush Creek	Wright
Brush Creek	Douglas
Bryan	Douglas
Buchanan	Douglas
Buchanan	Sullivan
Buchanan	Atchison
Buck Prairie	Lawrence
Buckeye	Shannon
Bucklin	Linn
Buffalo Hart	McDonald
Buffalo May	McDonald
Buffalo	Newton
Buffalo	Dunklin
Buffalo	Morgan
Buffalo	Pike
Burdine	Texas
Burr Oak	Lincoln
Burris Fork	Moniteau
Burton	Howard
Butler	Harrison
Butler	Pemiscot
Butler	St. Clair
Butterfield	Barry
Byrd	Cape Girardeau
Cairo	Randolph
Caldwell	Callaway
Callao	Macon
Calumet	Pike
Calvey	Franklin
Calwood	Callaway
Cambridge	Saline
Camden	Ray
Camden	DeKalb
Camp Branch	Warren
Camp Branch	Cass
Campbell No. 1	Greene
Campbell No. 2	Greene
Campbell	Douglas
Campbell	Polk
Canaan	Gasconade
Cane Creek	Butler
Canton	Lewis
Cape Girardeau	Cape Girardeau
Capps Creek	Barry
Carroll	Texas
Carroll	Platte
Carroll	Reynolds
Carrollton	Carroll
Carter	Carter
Cass	Stone
Cass	Greene
Cass	Texas
Cass	Douglas
Cassidy	Christian
Castor	Stoddard
Castor	Madison
Cedar Bluff	Oregon
Cedar Creek	Taney
Cedar Creek	Wayne
Cedar	Dade
Cedar	Cedar
Cedar	Callaway
Cedar	Pettis
Cedar	Boone
Center No. 1	Greene
Center No. 2	Greene
Center No. 3	Greene
Center	Buchanan
Center	Vernon
Center	Hickory
Center	St. Clair
Center	Ralls
Center	Dade
Center	Knox
Center	McDonald
Centerview	Johnson
Central	Barton
Central	Jefferson
Central	Madison
Central	Perry
Central	Franklin
Centralia	Boone
Chadwick	Christian
Chalk Level	St. Clair
Champion	Douglas
Chapel	Howell
Chariton	Randolph
Chariton	Howard
Chariton	Macon
Chariton	Chariton
Chariton	Schuyler
Charlotte	Bates
Charrette	Warren
Cherry Valley	Carroll
Chesterfield	St. Louis
Chilhowee	Johnson
Chillicothe	Livingston
Chouteau	Clay
Cinque Hommes	Perry
City	Barton
Clark Fork	Cooper
Clark	Lincoln
Clark	Cole
Clark	Chariton
Clark	Atchison
Clark	Wright
Clay	Lafayette
Clay	Clark
Clay	Saline
Clay	Ralls
Clay	Holt
Clay	Greene
Clay	Harrison
Clay	Shelby
Clay	Dunklin
Clay	Monroe
Clay	Andrew
Clay	Sullivan
Clay	Linn
Clay	Atchison
Clay	Gasconade
Clay	Adair
Clay	Douglas
Clayton	St. Louis
Clear Creek	Cooper
Clear Creek	Vernon
Cleveland	Callaway
Clifton	Randolph
Clinton	Clinton
Clinton	Henry
Clinton	Douglas
Clinton	Texas
Cliquot	Polk
Coal	Vernon
Cockrell	Chariton
Cold Spring	Phelps
Coldwater	Cass
Cole	Benton
Colfax	Atchison
Colfax	Harrison
Colfax	DeKalb
Colfax	Daviess
Collins	St. Clair
Colony	Knox
Columbia	Boone
Columbus	Johnson
Combs	Carroll
Commerce	Scott
Como	New Madrid
Concord	Pemiscot
Concord	Washington
Concord	Clinton
Concord	St. Louis
Coon Island	Butler
Cooper	Gentry
Cooter	Pemiscot
Corsicana	Barry
Cote Sans Dessein	Callaway
Cottleville	St. Charles
Cotton Hill	Dunklin
Couch	Oregon
Courtois	Crawford
Cowan	Wayne
Crane Creek	Barry
Crawford	Osage
Crawford	Buchanan
Cream Ridge	Livingston
Creve Coeur	St. Louis
Crooked Creek	Bollinger
Crooked River	Ray
Cross Timbers	Hickory
Cuivre	Pike
Cuivre	Audrain
Cullen	Pulaski
Cunningham	Chariton
Current River	Ripley
Current	Dent
Current	Texas
Cypress	Harrison
Dale	Atchison
Dallas	Harrison
Dallas	St. Clair
Dallas	DeKalb
Danville	Montgomery
Dardenne	St. Charles
Date	Texas
Davis	Caldwell
Davis	Lafayette
Davis	Henry
Dawson	Phelps
Dawt	Ozark
Dayton	Cass
Dayton	Newton
De Witt	Carroll
Deepwater	Bates
Deepwater	Henry
Deer Creek	Henry
Deer Creek	Bates
Deerfield	Vernon
Delaware	Shannon
Dent	Iron
Des Moines	Clark
Dickerson	Lewis
Diggins	Webster
Dillon	Phelps
Dolan	Cass
Doniphan	Ripley
Dover	Lafayette
Dover	Vernon
Doyal	St. Clair
Doylesport	Barton
Drake	Macon
Dresden	Pettis
Dry Creek	Maries
Dry Creek	Howell
Drywood	Vernon
Duck Creek	Stoddard
Duncan	Sullivan
Duval	Jasper
Eagle	Macon
Easley	Macon
East Benton	Christian
East Boone	Bates
East Finley	Christian
East Fulton	Callaway
East Looney	Polk
East Madison	Polk
East Ozark	Webster
East Republic	Greene
Egypt	Carroll
Eldridge	Laclede
Elk Creek	Wright
Elk Fork	Pettis
Elk Horn	McDonald
Elk River East	McDonald
Elk River West	McDonald
Elk	Stoddard
Elkhart	Bates
Elm	Putnam
Elmwood	Saline
Eminence	Shannon
Empire	Andrew
Enterprise	Linn
Epps	Butler
Equality	Miller
Erie Goodman	McDonald
Erie McNatt	McDonald
Ernest	Dade
Eugene	Carroll
Everett	Cass
Exeter	Barry
Fabius	Marion
Fabius	Knox
Fabius	Schuyler
Fair	Platte
Fairfield	Carroll
Fairview	Livingston
Fairview	Caldwell
Fairview	Henry
Falling Spring	Oregon
Ferguson	St. Louis
Fields Creek	Henry
Filmore	Bollinger
Findley	Douglas
Finley	Webster
Fishing River	Ray
Fishing River	Clay
Five Mile	Newton
Flat Creek A	Stone
Flat Creek B	Stone
Flat Creek	Barry
Flat Creek	Pettis
Flatwoods	Ripley
Flemington	Polk
Fletchall	Worth
Florissant	St. Louis
Folker	Clark
Forbes	Holt
Forest	Holt
Fort Osage	Jackson
Fox Creek	Harrison
Fox	Platte
Franklin No. 1	Greene
Franklin No. 2	Greene
Franklin	Grundy
Franklin	Newton
Franklin	Miller
Franklin	Howard
Franklin	Laclede
Franklin	Dent
Freeborn	Dunklin
Freedom	Lafayette
Freistatt	Lawrence
Friedens	St. Charles
Fristoe	Benton
Frontier	St. Charles
Galena	Jasper
Gallatin	Clay
Garden Grove	Christian
Garrison	Christian
Gasconade	Laclede
Gasconade	Wright
Gatewood	Ripley
Gillis Bluff	Butler
Gladden	Dent
Glaze	Miller
Glenwood	Schuyler
Godair	Pemiscot
Goebel	Oregon
Golden City	Barton
Goldsberry	Howell
Gomer	Caldwell
Granby	Newton
Grand Pass	Saline
Grand River	Bates
Grand River	DeKalb
Grand River	Cass
Grand River	Daviess
Grand River	Livingston
Grant	Caldwell
Grant	Dade
Grant	Clark
Grant	Harrison
Grant	Putnam
Grant	Stone
Grant	Nodaway
Grant	Webster
Grant	Dallas
Grant	DeKalb
Grantsville	Linn
Grape Grove	Ray
Gravois	St. Louis
Green Ridge	Pettis
Green	Hickory
Green	Platte
Green	Lawrence
Green	Livingston
Green	Nodaway
Greene	Worth
Greensburg	Knox
Grover	Johnson
Guthrie	Callaway
Hadley	St. Louis
Hamilton	Caldwell
Hamilton	Harrison
Hardin	Clinton
Harmony	Washington
Harris	Ripley
Harrison	Grundy
Harrison	Mercer
Harrison	Vernon
Harrison	Daviess
Harrison	Moniteau
Harrison	Scotland
Hart	Wright
Hartford	Pike
Harvester	St. Charles
Haw Creek	Morgan
Hawk Point	Lincoln
Hayti	Pemiscot
Hazel Hill	Johnson
Hazelwood	Webster
Heath Creek	Pettis
Henry	Vernon
Hermitage	Hickory
Hickory Grove	Warren
Hickory	Holt
High Prairie	Webster
High Ridge	Jefferson
Highland	Lewis
Highland	Oregon
Hill	Carroll
Hoberg	Lawrence
Holcomb	Dunklin
Holland	Pemiscot
Homer	Bates
Honey Creek	Henry
Hopkins	Nodaway
Hough	New Madrid
Houstonia	Pettis
Howard	Gentry
Howard	Bates
Howell	Howell
Hubble	Cape Girardeau
Hudson	Bates
Hudson	Macon
Huggins	Gentry
Hughes	Nodaway
Hughesville	Pettis
Hurley	Stone
Hurricane	Lincoln
Hurricane	Carroll
Hutton Valley	Howell
Imperial	Jefferson
Independence	Nodaway
Independence	Macon
Independence	Dunklin
Independence	Schuyler
Index	Cass
Indian Creek	Monroe
Indian	Pike
Iron	St. Francois
Iron	Iron
Jackson No. 1	Greene
Jackson No. 2	Greene
Jackson	Douglas
Jackson	Clark
Jackson	Putnam
Jackson	Clinton
Jackson	Texas
Jackson	Osage
Jackson	Carter
Jackson	Webster
Jackson	Randolph
Jackson	Shannon
Jackson	Nodaway
Jackson	Macon
Jackson	Reynolds
Jackson	Ozark
Jackson	St. Clair
Jackson	Shelby
Jackson	Johnson
Jackson	Camden
Jackson	Ste. Genevieve
Jackson	Polk
Jackson	Sullivan
Jackson	Livingston
Jackson	Dallas
Jackson	Monroe
Jackson	Callaway
Jackson	Gentry
Jackson	Maries
Jackson	Andrew
Jackson	Grundy
Jackson	Buchanan
Jackson	Daviess
Jackson	Jasper
Jackson	Linn
James Bayou	Mississippi
Jamesport	Daviess
Jasper	Dallas
Jasper	Ozark
Jasper	Jasper
Jasper	Camden
Jasper	Taney
Jasper	Ralls
Jeddo	Knox
Jeff	Oregon
Jefferson	Cole
Jefferson	Johnson
Jefferson	Andrew
Jefferson	Daviess
Jefferson	Grundy
Jefferson	Shelby
Jefferson	St. Louis
Jefferson	Linn
Jefferson	Wayne
Jefferson	Maries
Jefferson	Polk
Jefferson	Harrison
Jefferson	Monroe
Jefferson	Osage
Jefferson	Scotland
Jefferson	Clark
Jefferson	Nodaway
Jefferson	Cedar
Jenkins	Barry
Jim Henry	Miller
Joachim	Jefferson
Jobe	Oregon
Johnson	Polk
Johnson	Washington
Johnson	Scotland
Johnson	Maries
Johnson	Carter
Johnson	Ripley
Johnson	Oregon
Johnston	Macon
Joplin	Jasper
Jordan	Hickory
Jordan	Ripley
Kaolin	Iron
Kaw	Jackson
Kearney	Clay
Kelley	Ripley
Kelly	Cooper
Kelly	Carter
Kelso	Scott
Keytesville	Chariton
Kickapoo	Platte
Kidder	Caldwell
Kiheka	Camden
Kinder	Cape Girardeau
King	Oregon
Kings Prairie	Barry
Kingston	Caldwell
Kingston	Washington
Kingsville	Johnson
Knobview	Crawford
Knoxville	Ray
La Belle	Lewis
La Font	New Madrid
La Monte	Pettis
La Plata	Macon
Lafayette	St. Louis
Lafayette	Clinton
Lake Creek	Pettis
Lake	Vernon
Lake	Buchanan
Lamar	Barton
Lamine	Cooper
Lathrop	Clinton
Le Sieur	New Madrid
Lead Hill	Christian
Lebanon	Cooper
Lebanon	Laclede
Lee	Platte
Leesville	Henry
Lemay	St. Louis
Lentner	Shelby
Leroy	Barton
Leslie	Carroll
Lesterville	Reynolds
Lewis and Clark	St. Louis
Lewis	New Madrid
Lewis	Holt
Lexington	Lafayette
Liberty	Marion
Liberty	Adair
Liberty	Daviess
Liberty	Schuyler
Liberty	Sullivan
Liberty	Bollinger
Liberty	Callaway
Liberty	Cape Girardeau
Liberty	Stoddard
Liberty	Grundy
Liberty	Pulaski
Liberty	Holt
Liberty	Putnam
Liberty	Phelps
Liberty	Macon
Liberty	Knox
Liberty	Iron
Liberty	Clay
Liberty	Washington
Liberty	Barry
Liberty	Crawford
Liberty	Madison
Liberty	Saline
Liberty	St. Francois
Liberty	Cole
Lick Creek	Ozark
Lincoln	Lawrence
Lincoln	Atchison
Lincoln	Stone
Lincoln	Holt
Lincoln	Nodaway
Lincoln	Andrew
Lincoln	Putnam
Lincoln	Christian
Lincoln	Grundy
Lincoln	Daviess
Lincoln	Douglas
Lincoln	Jasper
Lincoln	Caldwell
Lincoln	Clark
Lincoln	Dallas
Lincoln	Harrison
Linden	Christian
Lindenwood	St. Charles
Lindley	Mercer
Lindsey	Benton
Lingo	Macon
Linn	Dent
Linn	Moniteau
Linn	Cedar
Linn	Osage
Linn	Audrain
Little Prairie	Pemiscot
Little River	Pemiscot
Lockwood	Dade
Locust Creek	Linn
Logan	Reynolds
Logan	Wayne
Lone Oak	Bates
Long Prairie	Mississippi
Longrun	Ozark
Longwood	Pettis
Lorance	Bollinger
Lost Creek	Wayne
Loutre	Montgomery
Loutre	Audrain
Lyda	Macon
Lynch	Texas
Lyon	Franklin
Lyon	Lewis
Lyon	Knox
Madison	Cedar
Madison	Clark
Madison	Grundy
Madison	Harrison
Madison	Johnson
Madison	Mercer
Madison	Jasper
Marceline	Linn
Marion	Buchanan
Marion	Newton
Marion	Mercer
Marion	Cole
Marion	Dade
Marion	St. Francois
Marion	Daviess
Marion	Grundy
Marion	Jasper
Marion	Harrison
Marion	Monroe
Marquand	Madison
Marshall	Saline
Marshall	Platte
Maryland Heights	St. Louis
Mason	Marion
May	Platte
May/Smith	Laclede
McCracken	Christian
McCredie	Callaway
McDonald	Barry
McDonald	Jasper
McDowell	Barry
McKinley	Douglas
McKinley	Polk
McKinley	Stone
McMillen Coy	McDonald
McMillen Tiff	McDonald
McMurtrey	Douglas
Medicine	Mercer
Medicine	Livingston
Medicine	Putnam
Mendon	Chariton
Meramec	St. Louis
Meramec	Dent
Meramec	Phelps
Meramec	Franklin
Meramec	Jefferson
Meramec	Crawford
Metz	Vernon
Miami	Saline
Middle Fork	Macon
Middlefork	Worth
Middleton	Lafayette
Midland	St. Louis
Milford	Barton
Mill Creek	Morgan
Mill Spring	Wayne
Miller	Maries
Miller	Phelps
Miller	Dallas
Miller	Marion
Miller	Douglas
Miller	Gentry
Miller	Scotland
Millwood	Lincoln
Mine La Motte	Madison
Mineral	Barry
Mineral	Jasper
Mingo	Bates
Minton	Holt
Mirabile	Caldwell
Mississippi	Mississippi
Missouri River	St. Louis
Missouri	Boone
Monegaw	St. Clair
Monett	Barry
Moniteau	Howard
Moniteau	Randolph
Monroe	Monroe
Monroe	Nodaway
Monroe	Andrew
Monroe	Livingston
Monroe	Lincoln
Monroe	Daviess
Montevallo	Vernon
Montgomery	Wright
Montgomery	Hickory
Montgomery	Montgomery
Montier	Shannon
Montserrat	Johnson
Mooney	Polk
Moore	Shannon
Moore	Oregon
Mooresville	Livingston
Moreau	Moniteau
Moreau	Cole
Moreau	Morgan
Moreland	Scott
Morgan	Mercer
Morley	Scott
Morris	Sullivan
Morris	Texas
Morrow	Adair
Morrow	Macon
Moss Creek	Carroll
Mound	Bates
Moundville	Vernon
Mount Pleasant	Cass
Mount Pleasant	Lawrence
Mount Pleasant	Bates
Mount Pleasant	Scotland
Mount Vernon	Lawrence
Mountain Grove	Wright
Mountain	Barry
Mountain	McDonald
Murray	Greene
Musselfork	Chariton
Myatt	Howell
Myers	Grundy
Myrtle	Oregon
Myrtle	Knox
Narrows	Macon
Nashville	Barton
Neely	Butler
Neosho	Newton
New Haven	Franklin
New Home	Bates
New Lisbon	Stoddard
New Madrid	New Madrid
New York	Caldwell
Newport	Barton
Newton	Shannon
Newtonia	Newton
Niangua	Camden
Niangua	Webster
Nine Mile Prairie	Callaway
Nineveh	Adair
Nineveh	Lincoln
Nishnabotna	Atchison
Noble	Ozark
Nodaway	Nodaway
Nodaway	Holt
Nodaway	Andrew
Norman	Dent
Normandy	St. Louis
North Benton	Dallas
North Benton	Polk
North Campbell No. 1	Greene
North Campbell No. 2	Greene
North Campbell No. 3	Greene
North Elkhorn	Warren
North Galloway	Christian
North Green	Polk
North Linn	Christian
North Moniteau	Cooper
North Morgan	Dade
North River	Shelby
North Salem	Linn
North Sugar Creek	Randolph
North	Dade
Northeast Marion	Polk
Northfork	Barton
Northview	Christian
Northwest Marion	Polk
Northwest	St. Louis
Norwood	St. Louis
Nottinghill	Ozark
O'Fallon	St. Charles
Oak Hill	Crawford
Oakville	St. Louis
Ohio	Mississippi
Oldfield	Christian
Oliver	Taney
Orrick	Ray
Osage	Crawford
Osage	Vernon
Osage	Dent
Osage	Morgan
Osage	Bates
Osage	Miller
Osage	Cole
Osage	Camden
Osage	Laclede
Osage	St. Clair
Osage	Henry
Osceola	Camden
Osceola	St. Clair
Otterville	Cooper
Ozark	Lawrence
Ozark	Texas
Ozark	Oregon
Ozark	Barton
Ozark	Webster
Ozark	Barry
Palestine	Cooper
Parson Creek	Linn
Pascola	Pemiscot
Pawhuska	Camden
Pawnee	Platte
Peculiar	Cass
Pemiscot	Pemiscot
Pendleton	St. Francois
Penn	Sullivan
Peno	Pike
Perche	Boone
Perry	St. Francois
Pettis	Platte
Pettis	Adair
Phillipsburg	Laclede
Pierce	Texas
Pierce	Stone
Pierce	Lawrence
Pike	Carter
Pike	Stoddard
Pilgrim	Dade
Pilot Grove	Cooper
Pilot Grove	Moniteau
Pinckney	Warren
Pine A	Stone
Pine B	Stone
Pine Creek	Ozark
Pine	Ripley
Pineville Lanagan	McDonald
Pineville North	McDonald
Pineville South	McDonald
Piney	Oregon
Piney	Texas
Piney	Pulaski
Pioneer	Barry
Platte	Buchanan
Platte	Clay
Platte	Clinton
Platte	Andrew
Plattin	Jefferson
Pleasant Gap	Bates
Pleasant Hill	Cass
Pleasant Hill	Sullivan
Pleasant Ridge	Barry
Pleasant Valley	Wright
Polk	Christian
Polk	Sullivan
Polk	Dade
Polk	Nodaway
Polk	St. Clair
Polk	Madison
Polk	Cass
Polk	Ray
Polk	DeKalb
Polk	Atchison
Polk	Adair
Ponce de Leon	Stone
Pond Creek	Greene
Pontiac	Ozark
Poplar Bluff	Butler
Portage	New Madrid
Post Oak	Johnson
Poynor	Ripley
Prairie Home	Cooper
Prairie	Audrain
Prairie	Franklin
Prairie	Pettis
Prairie	Montgomery
Prairie	Randolph
Prairie	Lincoln
Prairie	Bates
Prairie	Howard
Prairie	Carroll
Prairie	Schuyler
Prairie	McDonald
Prairie	Jackson
Prairieville	Pike
Preston	Platte
Preston	Jasper
Purdy	Barry
Queeny	St. Louis
Randol	Cape Girardeau
Randolph	St. Francois
Ravanna	Mercer
Raymore	Cass
Red Oak	Lawrence
Reddish	Lewis
Rich Hill	Livingston
Richland	Ozark
Richland	Macon
Richland	Gasconade
Richland	Vernon
Richland	Douglas
Richland	Scott
Richland	Stoddard
Richland	Barton
Richland	Morgan
Richland	Putnam
Richmond	Howard
Richmond	Ray
Richwood	McDonald
Richwoods	Miller
Richwoods	Washington
Ridge	Carroll
River View	Jefferson
Rivers	St. Charles
Riverside	Christian
Roaring River	Barry
Roark	Gasconade
Robberson No. 1	Greene
Robberson No. 2	Greene
Rochester	Andrew
Rock Prairie	Dade
Rock	Jefferson
Rockford	Caldwell
Rockford	Carroll
Rockville	Bates
Rocky Fork	Boone
Rolla	Phelps
Rootwad	Scott
Roscoe	St. Clair
Rose Hill	Johnson
Rosedale	Christian
Roubidoux	Pulaski
Roubidoux	Texas
Round Grove	Macon
Round Grove	Marion
Round Prairie	Callaway
Rush	Buchanan
Russell	Macon
Russell	Camden
Ruth A	Stone
Ruth B City	Stone
Ruth B Rural	Stone
Ruth C Rural	Stone
Ruth C	Stone
Sac	Dade
Salem	Dunklin
Salem	Daviess
Salem	Perry
Salem	Lewis
Saline	Ste. Genevieve
Saline	Cooper
Saline	Miller
Saline	Ralls
Saline	Perry
Saling	Audrain
Salisbury	Chariton
Salt Creek	Chariton
Salt Fork	Saline
Salt Pond	Saline
Salt River	Adair
Salt River	Ralls
Salt River	Shelby
Salt River	Pike
Salt River	Schuyler
Salt River	Audrain
Salt River	Knox
Salt River	Randolph
Salt Springs	Randolph
Sampsel	Livingston
Sand Hill	Scotland
Sandywoods	Scott
Sarcoxie	Jasper
Sargent	Texas
Saverton	Ralls
Scopus	Bollinger
Scott	Taney
Sedalia	Pettis
Seneca	Christian
Seneca	Newton
Shamrock	Callaway
Shawnee	Cape Girardeau
Shawnee	Bates
Shawnee	Henry
Shell Knob	Barry
Shelton	Knox
Sheridan	Jasper
Sheridan	Dallas
Sheridan	Daviess
Sherman	Dallas
Sherman	DeKalb
Sherman	Putnam
Sherman	Cass
Sherman	Harrison
Sherrill	Texas
Shirley	Ripley
Shoal Creek	Newton
Shoal	Clinton
Short Bend	Dent
Siloam Springs	Howell
Silver Creek	Randolph
Simpson	Johnson
Sinking	Dent
Sioux	Platte
Sisson	Howell
Smith	Dade
Smith	Worth
Smithton	Pettis
Sni-A-Bar	Lafayette
Sni-A-Bar	Jackson
Snow Hill	Lincoln
Somerset	Mercer
South Benton	Polk
South Benton	Dallas
South Elkhorn	Warren
South Fork	Audrain
South Fork	Monroe
South Fork	Howell
South Galloway	Christian
South Green	Polk
South Linn	Christian
South Moniteau	Cooper
South Morgan	Dade
South River	Marion
South Sugar Creek	Randolph
South West	Barton
South	Dade
Southeast Marion	Polk
Southwest Marion	Polk
Spanish Lake	St. Louis
Sparta	Christian
Speedwell	St. Clair
Spencer Creek	St. Charles
Spencer	Ralls
Spencer	Douglas
Spencer	Pike
Spring Creek East	Dent
Spring Creek West	Dent
Spring Creek	Ozark
Spring Creek	Howell
Spring Creek	Phelps
Spring Creek	Shannon
Spring Creek	Douglas
Spring Creek	Maries
Spring Hollow	Laclede
Spring River	Lawrence
Spring Valley	Shannon
Springfield	Henry
Springfield	Greene
Spruce	Bates
St. Aubert	Callaway
St. Ferdinand	St. Louis
St. Francois	Butler
St. Francois	St. Francois
St. Francois	Madison
St. Francois	Wayne
St. James	Mississippi
St. James	Phelps
St. John	New Madrid
St. Johns	Franklin
St. Marys	Perry
St. Michael	Madison
St. Peters	St. Charles
Stark	Hickory
Ste. Genevieve	Ste. Genevieve
Stokes Mound	Carroll
Sugar Creek	Harrison
Sugar Creek	Barry
Sugartree	Carroll
Summit	Bates
Summit	Callaway
Swan	Taney
Sweet Home	Clark
Sylvania	Scott
Taber	St. Clair
Tarkio	Atchison
Tavern	Pulaski
Taylor	Sullivan
Taylor	Grundy
Taylor	Greene
Taylor	Shelby
Tebo	Henry
Templeton	Atchison
Ten Mile	Macon
Tesson Ferry	St. Louis
Texas	Dent
Thayer	Oregon
Third Creek	Gasconade
Thomas	Ripley
Thomson	Scotland
Thornfield	Ozark
Tiger Fork	Shelby
Tobin	Scotland
Tom	Benton
Trail Creek	Harrison
Tremont	Buchanan
Trenton	Grundy
Triplett	Chariton
Trotter	Carroll
Turnback	Lawrence
Twelvemile	Madison
Twin Groves	Jasper
Tyler	Hickory
Tywappity	Mississippi
Tywappity	Scott
Union Chapel	Christian
Union	Sullivan
Union	Polk
Union	Washington
Union	Stone
Union	Crawford
Union	Perry
Union	Holt
Union	Harrison
Union	Ste. Genevieve
Union	Laclede
Union	Webster
Union	Nodaway
Union	Wright
Union	Iron
Union	Daviess
Union	Clark
Union	Jasper
Union	Marion
Union	Cass
Union	Monroe
Union	Randolph
Union	Bollinger
Union	Franklin
Union	Lincoln
Union	Dunklin
Union	Putnam
Union	Pulaski
Union	Scotland
Union	Barton
Union	Worth
Union	Benton
Union	Ripley
Union	Lewis
University	St. Louis
Upper Loutre	Montgomery
Upton	Texas
Valle	Jefferson
Valley	Macon
Van Buren	Newton
Van Buren	Wright
Van Buren	Jackson
Van Horn	Carroll
Varner	Ripley
Vernon	Clark
Vest	Scotland
Vineyard	Lawrence
Virgil	Vernon
Virginia	Pemiscot
Wakenda	Carroll
Waldron	Platte
Walker	Henry
Walker	Moniteau
Walker	Vernon
Walls	Douglas
Walnut Creek	Macon
Walnut Grove	Greene
Walnut	Bates
Walnut	Adair
Walton	Washington
Warren	Camden
Warren	Marion
Warrensburg	Johnson
Washburn	Barry
Washington	Daviess
Washington	DeKalb
Washington	Ripley
Washington	Dade
Washington	Douglas
Washington	Clay
Washington	Johnson
Washington	Monroe
Washington	Osage
Washington	Dallas
Washington	Laclede
Washington	St. Clair
Washington	Clark
Washington	Vernon
Washington	Pettis
Washington	Cedar
Washington	Buchanan
Washington	Stone
Washington	Harrison
Washington	Grundy
Washington	Jackson
Washington	Nodaway
Washington	Greene
Washington	Carroll
Washington	Mercer
Washington	Lafayette
Washington	Franklin
Washington	Webster
Watkins	Dent
Waverly	Lincoln
Wayland	Chariton
Wayne	Bollinger
Wayne	Buchanan
Weaubleau	Hickory
Webb	Reynolds
Welch	Cape Girardeau
Wentzville	St. Charles
West Benton	Newton
West Benton	Christian
West Boone	Bates
West Bridges	Ozark
West Dolan	Cass
West Doniphan	Ripley
West Finley	Christian
West Fulton	Callaway
West Looney	Polk
West Madison	Polk
West Ozark	Webster
West Peculiar	Cass
West Point	Bates
West Republic	Greene
West	New Madrid
Weston	Platte
Wheatland	Hickory
Wheaton	Barry
Wheeling	Livingston
White Cloud	Nodaway
White Oak	Henry
White Oak	Harrison
White River	Barry
White Rock	McDonald
White	Macon
White	Benton
Whitewater	Cape Girardeau
Whitewater	Bollinger
Wildhorse	St. Louis
Williams	Wayne
Williams	Benton
Williams	Stone
Willow Fork	Moniteau
Willow Springs	Howell
Wilson	Adair
Wilson	Dallas
Wilson	Gentry
Wilson	Grundy
Wilson	Putnam
Wilson	Audrain
Wilson	Greene
Windsor	Jefferson
Windsor	Henry
Winona	Shannon
Wishart	Polk
Wolf Island	Mississippi
Wood	Douglas
Wood	Wright
Woodlawn	Monroe
Woodside	Oregon
Wyaconda	Clark
Yellow Creek	Chariton
Yellow Creek	Linn
York	Putnam
Zumbehl	St. Charles

== See also ==
- List of counties in Missouri
- List of municipalities in Missouri
