= Salt River Township =

Salt River Township may refer to

- Salt River Township, Adair County, Missouri
- Salt River Township, Audrain County, Missouri
- Salt River Township, Knox County, Missouri
- Salt River Township, Pike County, Missouri
- Salt River Township, Ralls County, Missouri
- Salt River Township, Randolph County, Missouri
- Salt River Township, Shelby County, Missouri
