= Ozark Township =

Ozark Township may refer to:

- Ozark Township, Polk County, Arkansas, in Polk County, Arkansas
- Ozark Township, Sharp County, Arkansas, in Sharp County, Arkansas
- Ozark Township, Anderson County, Kansas
- Ozark Township, Barry County, Missouri
- Ozark Township, Barton County, Missouri
- Ozark Township, Lawrence County, Missouri
- Ozark Township, Oregon County, Missouri
- Ozark Township, Texas County, Missouri
- Ozark Township, Webster County, Missouri
