= Moniteau Township =

Moniteau Township may refer to the following townships in the United States:

- Moniteau Township, Howard County, Missouri
- Moniteau Township, Randolph County, Missouri

== See also ==
- North Moniteau Township, Cooper County, Missouri
- South Moniteau Township, Cooper County, Missouri
