= McKinley Township =

McKinley Township may refer to:

== Michigan ==
- McKinley Township, Emmet County, Michigan
- McKinley Township, Huron County, Michigan

== Minnesota ==
- McKinley Township, Cass County, Minnesota

== Missouri ==
- McKinley Township, Douglas County, Missouri, in Douglas County, Missouri
- McKinley Township, Polk County, Missouri
- McKinley Township, Stone County, Missouri

== North Dakota ==
- McKinley Township, Ward County, North Dakota, in Ward County, North Dakota

== South Dakota ==
- McKinley Township, Marshall County, South Dakota, in Marshall County, South Dakota
