= Wilson Township, Missouri =

Wilson Township may refer to several places in the U.S. state of Missouri:

- Wilson Township, Adair County, Missouri
- Wilson Township, Audrain County, Missouri
- Wilson Township, Dallas County, Missouri
- Wilson Township, Gentry County, Missouri
- Wilson Township, Greene County, Missouri
- Wilson Township, Grundy County, Missouri
- Wilson Township, Putnam County, Missouri

See also

- Wilson Township (disambiguation)
