= South Moniteau Township, Cooper County, Missouri =

Township in the U.S. state of Missouri

South Moniteau Township
- Township
- Location in Cooper County
- Coordinates: 38°42′45″N 92°40′17″W
- Country: United States
- State: Missouri
- County: Cooper

Area
  - Total: 22.41 sq mi (58.04 km^{2})
  - Land: 22.39 sq mi (57.98 km^{2})
  - Water: 0.023 sq mi (0.06 km^{2}) 0.1%
- Elevation: 833 ft (254 m)

Population (2000)
  - Total: 194
  - Density: 8.5/sq mi (3.3/km^{2})
- Time zone: UTC-6 (CST)
  - Summer (DST): UTC-5 (CDT)
- ZIP codes: 65018, 65025
- GNIS feature ID: 0766539

South Moniteau Township is one of fourteen townships in Cooper County, Missouri, USA. As of the 2000 census, its population was 194.

== Geography ==
According to the United States Census Bureau, South Moniteau Township covers an area of 22.41 square miles (58.04 square kilometers); of this, 22.39 square miles (57.98 square kilometers, 99.9 percent) is land and 0.02 square miles (0.06 square kilometers, 0.1 percent) is water.

=== Adjacent townships ===
- North Moniteau Township (north)
- Linn Township, Moniteau County (northeast)
- Walker Township, Moniteau County (east)
- Moreau Township, Moniteau County (south)
- Willow Fork Township, Moniteau County (southwest)
- Kelly Township (west)

=== Cemeteries ===
The township contains these cemeteries: Renshaw and Smiley,

== School districts ==
- Clarksburg C-2
- Moniteau County R-I School District
- Prairie Home R-V School District

== Political districts ==
- Missouri's 6th congressional district
- State House District 117
- State Senate District 21
