= Hoberg Township, Lawrence County, Missouri =

Inactive township in the US state of Missouri

Coordinates: 37.0608°N 93.8594°W

Hoberg Township is an inactive township in Lawrence County, in the U.S. state of Missouri.

It was formed in 1910 from parts of Freistatt and Mount Vernon townships. Hoberg Township took its name from the community of Hoberg, Missouri, itself named after Henry Hoberg.
