= Little Prairie =

Little Prairie may refer to:

== Canada ==
- Chetwynd, formerly Little Prairie, British Columbia
  - Little Prairie Elementary School, a K-7 school in Chetwynd, belonging to the School District 59 Peace River South.

== United States ==
- Little Prairie, Wisconsin, an unincorporated community located in the town of Troy, Walworth County, Wisconsin
- Little Prairie Township, Missouri, an inactive township in Pemiscot County, Missouri
- Little Prairie, Louisiana, an unincorporated community in Ascension Parish, Louisiana.
