= McKinley Township, Michigan =

McKinley Township is the name of some places in the U.S. state of Michigan:

- McKinley Township, Emmet County, Michigan
- McKinley Township, Huron County, Michigan

== See also ==
- McKinley, Michigan, an unincorporated community in Mentor Township, Oscoda County
- McKinley Township (disambiguation)
