= Imperial Township, Jefferson County, Missouri =

Township in Missouri, U.S.

Coordinates: 38°22′06″N 90°26′57″W

Imperial Township
- Township
- Interactive map of Imperial Township
- Country: United States of America
- State: Missouri
- County: Jefferson
- GNIS feature ID: 2397815

Imperial Township is a township in northeastern Jefferson County, in the U.S. state of Missouri. The township borders the Census-designated place of Imperial in Windsor Township, and contains the four communities: Antonia, Barnhart, Liguori, and Otto.
