= Piney Township =

Piney Township may refer to the following townships in the United States:

- Piney Township, Carroll County, Arkansas
- Piney Township, Oregon County, Missouri
- Piney Township, Pennsylvania

== See also ==
- Piney Creek Township, Alleghany County, North Carolina
