= Speed, Missouri =

Unincorporated community in the US state of Missouri

- Unincorporated community
- Location within Missouri
- Coordinates: 38°50′53″N 92°48′12″W
- Country: United States
- State: Missouri
- County: Cooper County
- Township: Palestine Township
- Elevation: 669 ft (204 m)
- ZIP code: 65233

Speed is an unincorporated community in Palestine Township, Cooper County, Missouri, United States.

== Geography ==
Speed is located along Missouri Route F on the west bank of Stephens Branch of Petite Saline Creek, four miles north of Bunceton. Boonville is nine miles to the north-northeast. The community of Bellair is two miles to the west on Missouri Route 5.

== History ==
Speed was originally named New Palestine, and under the latter name was laid out in 1868. The present name is after Austin Speed, a railroad official. A post office called New Palestine was established in 1869, the name was changed to Speed in 1898, and the post office closed in 1955.
