= Clifton City, Missouri =

Unincorporated community in the US state of Missouri

Clifton City
- Unincorporated community
- Location within Missouri
- Coordinates: 38°45′53″N 93°02′29″W
- Country: United States
- State: Missouri
- County: Cooper County
- Township: Otterville Township
- Elevation: 771 ft (235 m)
- ZIP code: 65348
- GNIS feature ID: 0739984

Clifton City is an unincorporated community in southwestern Cooper County, Missouri, United States. The community is located on Missouri Route 135 and Missouri Route BB. The nearest town is Otterville approximately five miles to the south. It is also 10 miles (16 km) northeast of Sedalia. The Lamine River flows past one half mile east of the town. The Cooper - Pettis county boundary lies three-quarters of a mile west of the location. The Katy Trail State Park passes the south edge of the community.

== History ==
Clifton City was originally called Cranmer's Mill, and under the latter name was settled in the early 1830s. A post office called Clifton City was established in 1873, and remained in operation until 1959. The present name most likely is after Clifton R. Woods, an early settler.
