= Mount Vernon Township, Lawrence County, Missouri =

Township in the US state of Missouri

Mount Vernon Township
- Civil township
- Interactive map of Mount Vernon Township
- Coordinates: 37.1233°N 93.7964°W
- Country: United States
- State: Missouri
- County: Lawrence

Government
  - Type: Board of trustees

Area
  - Total: 82.6 sq mi (214 km^{2})

Population
  - Total: 8,267

Mount Vernon Township is a civil township located in Lawrence County, Missouri, in the United States. The township is part of the larger Mount Vernon micropolitan area, and it has a population of 8,267.

The township covers an area of 82.6 square miles, and it includes the city of Mount Vernon, which serves as the county seat of Lawrence County. Other communities located in the township include Jenkins, Hoberg, and Stotts City.

Mount Vernon Township is governed by an elected board of trustees. Its services include road maintenance, emergency management, and property assessment. The township is also home to several parks and recreational facilities, including the Mount Vernon City Park and the Spring Park.

The township is located in the southwestern part of Missouri and is approximately 30 miles southwest of Springfield. It is bordered by other townships in Lawrence County, including Ozark Township to the north, Pierce Township to the east, and Red Oak Township to the south.
