= Virginia Township =

Virginia Township may refer to the following townships in the United States:

- Virginia Township, Cass County, Illinois
- Virginia Township, Pemiscot County, Missouri
- Virginia Township, Coshocton County, Ohio
