= Osceola Township, Camden County, Missouri =

Osceola Township
- Township
- Location in Camden County
- Coordinates: 38°03′09″N 92°45′40″W
- Country: United States
- State: Missouri
- County: Camden

Area
  - Total: 32.14 sq mi (83.23 km^{2})
  - Land: 25.7 sq mi (66.6 km^{2})
  - Water: 6.42 sq mi (16.63 km^{2}) 19.98%
- Elevation: 883 ft (269 m)

Population (2000)
  - Total: 3,457
  - Density: 134/sq mi (51.9/km^{2})
- Time zone: UTC-6 (CST)
  - Summer (DST): UTC-5 (CDT)
- ZIP codes: 65020, 65052
- GNIS feature ID: 2397850

Osceola Township is one of eleven townships in Camden County, Missouri, USA. As of the 2000 census, its population was 3,457.

== Geography ==
According to the United States Census Bureau, Osceola Township covers an area of 32.13 square miles (83.23 square kilometers); of this, 25.71 square miles (66.6 square kilometers, 80.02 percent) is land and 6.42 square miles (16.63 square kilometers, 19.98 percent) is water.

=== Cities, towns, villages ===
- Camdenton (partial)

=== Adjacent townships ===
- Jasper Township (north)
- Osage Township (northeast)
- Kiheka Township (east)
- Niangua Township (southwest)
- Adair Township (northwest)

=== Cemeteries ===
The township contains Memorial Cemetery.

=== Major highways ===
- U.S. Route 54
- Missouri Route 5

== School districts ==
- Camdenton R-Iii School District

== Political districts ==
- Missouri's 4th congressional district
- State House District 155
- State Senate District 33
