= Salt Pond Township, Saline County, Missouri =

Township in Saline County, Missouri, U.S.

Coordinates: 38°59′00″N 93°24′30″W

Salt Pond Township is an inactive township in Saline County, in the U.S. state of Missouri.

The two principle settlements in the township are Sweet Springs and Emma. Emma is on the border with Freedom Township in Lafayette County. The principle waterway in the township is the Blackwater River, with its major tributary, Davis Creek. The northernmost part of the Perry Memorial Conservation Area is located in Salt Pond Township.

Salt Pond Township was established on November 25, 1820 when Saline County was created, and it was named for the numerous brine springs in the area; but it was not formally organized until May 1834. The first European settlement in the township was in 1817 by Edward Reavis who established his family and retainers about four miles north of present-day Sweet Springs, where he engaged in salt mining.
