= Marquand Township, Madison County, Missouri =

Township in Madison County, Missouri

Coordinates: 37°25′18″N 90°12′42″W

Marquand
- Township
- Nickname: German Township
- Interactive map of Marquand
- Country: USA
- State: Missouri
- County: Madison
- Established: 1842

Marquand Township is a township located in Madison County, Missouri, in the United States of America.

== History ==
Marquand Township is located in the eastern part of Madison County. This township was first organized in 1842 and called German Township due to the many German settlers who were there. German Township remained until 1845 when the county was redistricted, and again in 1909 when it was divided to form Big Creek Township. In 1918, May 7, "came H.K. Lett, Wm. White, J.P. Ennes, et al (in number about 130), all citizens of German Township and presented a petition praying that the name of their township be changed from German Township to Marquand Township," and thus the name was changed. The reason given was the feeling which existed during World War I against even the word German. Marquand is the principal settlement in this township.
