= Spring Creek West Township, Dent County, Missouri =

Township in Dent County, Missouri, U.S.

Coordinates: 37.6478°N 91.5975°W

Spring Creek West Township is a township in Dent County, in the U.S. state of Missouri.

Spring Creek West Township was named from Spring Creek.
