= Osage Township, Camden County, Missouri =

Township in Missouri, United States

Osage Township
- Township
- Coordinates: 38°04′04″N 092°43′20″W
- Country: United States
- State: Missouri
- County: Camden

Area
  - Total: 26.46 sq mi (68.52 km^{2})
  - Land: 20.5 sq mi (53.1 km^{2})
  - Water: 5.95 sq mi (15.42 km^{2}) 22.5%
- Elevation: 705 ft (215 m)

Population (2010)
  - Total: 4,945
  - Density: 187/sq mi (72.2/km^{2})
- FIPS code: 29-55046
- GNIS feature ID: 0766392

Osage Township is one of eleven townships in Camden County, Missouri, United States. As of the 2010 census, its population was 4,945.

Osage Township was established in 1841, taking its name from the Osage River.

== Geography ==
Osage Township borders Jasper Township to the north and west, Pawhuska Township to the east, Kiheka Township to the east, and Osceola Township to the southwest.

Osage Township covers an area of 26.46 square miles (68.5 km^{2}) and contains two incorporated settlements: Linn Creek and Osage Beach. It contains four cemeteries: Hall, Hopkins, Memorial and Old Erie.

The streams of Blue Springs Branch, Linn Creek, North Fork Linn Creek and South Fork Linn Creek run through this township.

== Transportation ==
Osage Township contains two airports or landing strips: Hospital Property Heliport and Linn Creek-Grand Glaize Memorial Airport.
