= North Moniteau Township, Cooper County, Missouri =

Township in the U.S. state of Missouri

North Moniteau Township
- Township
- Location in Cooper County
- Coordinates: 38°45′32″N 92°39′12″W
- Country: United States
- State: Missouri
- County: Cooper

Area
  - Total: 26.80 sq mi (69.42 km^{2})
  - Land: 26.80 sq mi (69.42 km^{2})
  - Water: 0 sq mi (0 km^{2}) 0%
- Elevation: 771 ft (235 m)

Population (2000)
  - Total: 182
  - Density: 6.7/sq mi (2.6/km^{2})
- Time zone: UTC-6 (CST)
  - Summer (DST): UTC-5 (CDT)
- ZIP codes: 65018, 65025, 65068, 65237
- GNIS feature ID: 0766533

North Moniteau Township is one of fourteen townships in Cooper County, Missouri, USA. As of the 2000 census, its population was 182.

== Geography ==
According to the United States Census Bureau, North Moniteau Township covers an area of 26.8 square miles (69.42 square kilometers).

=== Unincorporated towns ===
- Pisgah at 38.776415°N 92.649357°W

(This list is based on USGS data and may include former settlements.)

=== Adjacent townships ===
- Prairie Home Township (northeast)
- Linn Township, Moniteau County (east)
- Walker Township, Moniteau County (southeast)
- South Moniteau Township (south)
- Kelly Township (west)
- Clark Fork Township (northwest)

=== Cemeteries ===
The township contains these two cemeteries: Jones and Strickfaden.

== School districts ==
- Cooper County C-4
- Prairie Home R-V School District

== Political districts ==
- Missouri's 6th congressional district
- State House District 117
- State Senate District 21
