= Spring Creek Township, Phelps County, Missouri =

Township in Phelps County, Missouri, U.S.

Coordinates: 37.6925°N 91.9242°W

Spring Creek Township is an inactive township in Phelps County, in the U.S. state of Missouri.

Spring Creek Township takes its name from Spring Creek.
