= Spring Creek Township, Maries County, Missouri =

Township in Maries County, Missouri, U.S.

Coordinates: 38.1047°N 91.8497°W

Spring Creek Township is an inactive township in Maries County, in the U.S. state of Missouri.

Spring Creek Township took its name from the creek of the same name within its borders.
