= Prairie Home Township, Cooper County, Missouri =

Township in the U.S. state of Missouri

Prairie Home Township
- Township
- Location in Cooper County
- Coordinates: 38°49′41″N 92°35′30″W
- Country: United States
- State: Missouri
- County: Cooper

Area
  - Total: 33.00 sq mi (85.46 km^{2})
  - Land: 32.97 sq mi (85.39 km^{2})
  - Water: 0.027 sq mi (0.07 km^{2}) 0.08%
- Elevation: 850 ft (259 m)

Population (2000)
  - Total: 554
  - Density: 17/sq mi (6.5/km^{2})
- Time zone: UTC-6 (CST)
  - Summer (DST): UTC-5 (CDT)
- ZIP codes: 65068, 65233, 65287
- GNIS feature ID: 0766537

Prairie Home Township is one of fourteen townships in Cooper County, Missouri, USA. As of the 2000 census, its population was 554.

== Geography ==
According to the United States Census Bureau, Prairie Home Township covers an area of 33 square miles (85.46 square kilometers); of this, 32.97 square miles (85.39 square kilometers, 99.92 percent) is land and 0.03 square miles (0.07 square kilometers, 0.08 percent) is water.

=== Cities, towns, villages ===
- Prairie Home

=== Adjacent townships ===
- Saline Township (north)
- Linn Township, Moniteau County (east)
- North Moniteau Township (southwest)
- Clark Fork Township (west)

=== Cemeteries ===
The township contains these five cemeteries: Ellis, Harris, New Salem, Providence and Robison.

=== Major highways ===
- Missouri Route 87

== School districts ==
- Boonville School District
- Prairie Home R-V School District

== Political districts ==
- Missouri's 6th congressional district
- State House District 117
- State Senate District 21
