= Spring Creek East Township, Dent County, Missouri =

Township in Dent County, Missouri, U.S.

Coordinates: 37.6428°N 91.4806°W

Spring Creek East Township is a township in Dent County, in the U.S. state of Missouri.

Spring Creek East Township was named from Spring Creek, which flows through it.
