= Otterville Township, Cooper County, Missouri =

Township in the U.S. state of Missouri

Otterville Township
- Township
- Location in Cooper County
- Coordinates: 38°42′49″N 93°00′48″W
- Country: United States
- State: Missouri
- County: Cooper

Area
  - Total: 27.24 sq mi (70.56 km^{2})
  - Land: 27.24 sq mi (70.55 km^{2})
  - Water: 0.0077 sq mi (0.02 km^{2}) 0.03%
- Elevation: 725 ft (221 m)

Population (2000)
  - Total: 913
  - Density: 33/sq mi (12.9/km^{2})
- Time zone: UTC-6 (CST)
  - Summer (DST): UTC-5 (CDT)
- ZIP codes: 65276, 65301, 65348
- GNIS feature ID: 0766534

Otterville Township is one of fourteen townships in Cooper County, Missouri, USA. As of the 2000 census, its population was 913.

== Geography ==
According to the United States Census Bureau, Otterville Township covers an area of 27.24 square miles (70.56 square kilometers); of this, 27.24 square miles (70.55 square kilometers, 99.99 percent) is land and 0.01 square miles (0.02 square kilometers, 0.03 percent) is water.

=== Cities, towns, villages ===
- Otterville

=== Unincorporated towns ===
- Clifton City at 38.76474°N 93.041310°W

(This list is based on USGS data and may include former settlements.)

=== Adjacent townships ===
- Clear Creek Township (north)
- Lebanon Township (east)
- Richland Township, Morgan County (south)
- Smithton Township, Pettis County (southwest)
- Bowling Green Township, Pettis County (west)
- Heath Creek Township, Pettis County (northwest)

=== Cemeteries ===
The township contains these two cemeteries: Saint Josephs and Shackleford.

=== Major highways ===
- U.S. Route 50
- Route 135

== School districts ==
- Otterville R-Vi
- Pilot Grove C-4
- Smithton School District

== Political districts ==
- Missouri's 6th congressional district
- State House District 117
- State House District 118
- State Senate District 21
- State Senate District 28
