= Kelly Township, Cooper County, Missouri =

Township in the U.S. state of Missouri

Kelly Township
- Township
- Location in Cooper County
- Coordinates: 38°46′39″N 92°47′46″W
- Country: United States
- State: Missouri
- County: Cooper

Area
  - Total: 66.70 sq mi (172.74 km^{2})
  - Land: 66.61 sq mi (172.53 km^{2})
  - Water: 0.081 sq mi (0.21 km^{2}) 0.12%
- Elevation: 873 ft (266 m)

Population (2000)
  - Total: 676
  - Density: 10/sq mi (3.9/km^{2})
- Time zone: UTC-6 (CST)
  - Summer (DST): UTC-5 (CDT)
- ZIP codes: 65025, 65081, 65237, 65276, 65348, 65354
- GNIS feature ID: 0766530

Kelly Township is one of fourteen townships in Cooper County, Missouri, USA. As of the 2000 census, its population was 676.

Kelly Township was named after John Kelley, a pioneer citizen.

== Geography ==
According to the United States Census Bureau, Kelly Township covers an area of 66.69 square miles (172.74 square kilometers); of this, 66.61 square miles (172.53 square kilometers, 99.88 percent) is land and 0.08 square miles (0.21 square kilometers, 0.12 percent) is water.

=== Cities, towns, villages ===
- Bunceton

=== Extinct towns ===
- Petersburg at 38.801133°N 92.802414°W

(These towns are listed as "historical" by the USGS.)

=== Adjacent townships ===
- Palestine Township (north)
- Clark Fork Township (northeast)
- North Moniteau Township (east)
- South Moniteau Township (east)
- Willow Fork Township, Moniteau County (south)
- Mill Creek Township, Morgan County (southwest)
- Lebanon Township (west)

=== Cemeteries ===
The township contains these five cemeteries: Chilton, Hopewell, Howard, Masonic and Woods.

=== Major highways ===
- Missouri Route 5

== School districts ==
- Cooper County C-4
- Moniteau County R-Vi School District
- Otterville R-Vi
- Pilot Grove C-4

== Political districts ==
- Missouri's 6th congressional district
- State House District 117
- State Senate District 21
