= Dawt Township, Ozark County, Missouri =

Township in Ozark County, Missouri, U.S.

Coordinates: 36.5936°N 92.2739°W

Dawt Township is an inactive township in Ozark County, in the U.S. state of Missouri.

Dawt Township was established in 1908, taking its name from the community of Dawt, Missouri.
