= South Sugar Creek Township, Randolph County, Missouri =

Township in the US state of Missouri

Coordinates: 39.4006°N 92.4019°W

South Sugar Creek Township is a township in Randolph County, in the U.S. state of Missouri.

South Sugar Creek Township takes its name from Sugar Creek.
