= North Sugar Creek Township, Randolph County, Missouri =

Inactive township in the US state of Missouri

Coordinates: 39.4436°N 92.4586°W

North Sugar Creek Township is a township in Randolph County, in the U.S. state of Missouri.

North Sugar Creek Township takes its name from Sugar Creek.
