= Pine Township, Ripley County, Missouri =

Township in Ripley County, Missouri, U.S.

Coordinates: 36.7350°N 91.0753°W

Pine Township is an inactive township in Ripley County, in the U.S. state of Missouri.

Pine Township was erected on August 5, 1890, from portions of Kelley and Forshe townships. It was named after the community of Pine, Missouri.
