= Watkins Township, Dent County, Missouri =

Township in Dent County, Missouri, U.S.

Coordinates: 37.69°N 91.73°W

Watkins Township is an inactive township in the northwest portion of Dent County, in the U.S. state of Missouri.

Watkins Township was established in 1851 as one of the original county townships, taking its name from James D. Watkins (September 4, 1800 in VA - June 19, 1863 in MO), a pioneer citizen who settled on Dry Fork Creek circa 1830 and who served as a Justice of the Peace.
