= Cross Timbers Township, Hickory County, Missouri =

Township in Missouri

Coordinates: 38.0264°N 93.2522°W

Cross Timbers Township is an inactive township in Hickory County, in the U.S. state of Missouri.

Cross Timbers Township was established in 1873, taking its name from the community of Cross Timbers, Missouri.
