= Sedalia Township, Pettis County, Missouri =

Township in Pettis County, Missouri, U.S.

Coordinates: 38.6922°N 93.2300°W

Sedalia Township is an inactive township in Pettis County, in the U.S. state of Missouri.

Sedalia Township was erected in 1873, taking its name from the community of Sedalia, Missouri.
