= Swan Township, Taney County, Missouri =

Township in Taney County, Missouri, U.S.

Coordinates: 36.7156°N 93.0667°W

Swan Township is an active township in Taney County, in the U.S. state of Missouri.

Swan Township was founded in 1839, taking its name from Swan Creek.
