= Richland Township, Scott County, Missouri =

Township in Scott County, Missouri, U.S.

Coordinates: 36.8972°N 89.5606°W

Richland Township is an inactive township in Scott County, in the U.S. state of Missouri. Richland Township was created in 1822, and so named on account of its rich soil.
