= Lost Creek Township, Wayne County, Missouri =

Township in Wayne County, Missouri, U.S.

Coordinates: 37.0300°N 90.2983°W

Lost Creek Township is an inactive township in Wayne County, in the U.S. state of Missouri.

Lost Creek Township was erected in 1872, taking its name from Lost Creek.
