= Mountain Township, McDonald County, Missouri =

Township in McDonald County, Missouri, U.S.

Coordinates: 36.5339°N 94.1336°W

Mountain Township is an inactive township in McDonald County, in the U.S. state of Missouri.

Mountain Township was so named on account of its uneven terrain.
