= James Bayou Township, Mississippi County, Missouri =

Township in Mississippi County, Missouri, U.S.

Coordinates: 36.6283°N 89.2853°W

James Bayou Township is an inactive township in Mississippi County, in the U.S. state of Missouri.

A variant name was "St. James Bayou Township". James Bayou Township was established in 1836, taking its name from the St. James Bayou within its borders.
