= Union Township, Scotland County, Missouri =

Township in Scotland County, Missouri, U.S.

Coordinates: 40.5456°N 92.1417°W

Union Township is an inactive township in Scotland County, in the U.S. state of Missouri.

Union Township was originally called "Green Township", and under the latter name was established in 1859. The present name was adopted in 1866.
