= Elk Horn Township, McDonald County, Missouri =

Township in the US state of Missouri

Coordinates: 36.6925°N 94.2383°W

Elk Horn Township is an inactive township in McDonald County, in the U.S. state of Missouri.

Elk Horn Township takes its name from Elkhorn Creek.
