= Mississippi Township, Mississippi County, Missouri =

Township in Mississippi County, Missouri, U.S.

Coordinates: 36.8225°N 89.2064°W

Mississippi Township is an inactive township in Mississippi County, in the U.S. state of Missouri.

Mississippi Township was established in 1845, taking its name from the Mississippi River.
