= Bowlan Township, Shannon County, Missouri =

Defunct township in Missouri, US

Coordinates: 37.2161588°N 91.1615184°W

Bowlan Township is a defunct township in Shannon County, in the U.S. state of Missouri.

Bowlan Township was established in 1842, and named after the local Bowlin family, although the spelling is different.
