= Gladden Township, Dent County, Missouri =

Township in Missouri, U.S.

Coordinates: 37°27′49″N 91°30′33″W

Gladden Township is a township in Dent County, in the U.S. state of Missouri.

Gladden Township is located in the south-central section of the county; it was erected in 1894. It was originally named for the sub-region known as Gladden Valley, which itself was named for a family who settled there.
