= Garden Grove Township, Christian County, Missouri =

Township in Christian County, Missouri, U.S.

Coordinates: 37.02012°N 93.28394°W

Garden Grove Township is a township in central Christian County, Missouri.

The organization date and origin of the name of Garden Grove Township is unknown.
