= Richwood Township, McDonald County, Missouri =

Township in McDonald County, Missouri, U.S.

Coordinates: 36.6831°N 94.1406°W

Richwood Township is an inactive township in McDonald County, in the U.S. state of Missouri.

Richwood Township was established in 1866, and most likely named after an early settler.
