= Dresden Township, Pettis County, Missouri =

Inactive township in the US state of Missouri

Coordinates: 38.7608°N 93.3344°W

Dresden Township is an inactive township in Pettis County, in the U.S. state of Missouri.

Dresden Township was erected in 1873, and named after the community of Dresden, Missouri.
