= Buck Prairie Township, Lawrence County, Missouri =

Inactive township in the US state of Missouri

Coordinates: 36.9967°N 93.6453°W

Buck Prairie Township is an inactive township in Lawrence County, in the U.S. state of Missouri.

Buck Prairie Township took its name from a prairie of the same name, which was named after an early citizen with the surname Buck.
