= Diggins Township, Webster County, Missouri =

Township in the U.S. state of Missouri

Coordinates: 37.1833°N 92.8589°W

Diggins Township is a township in Webster County, in the U.S. state of Missouri.

Diggins Township takes its name from Mr. H.W. Diggins, a railroad official.
