= Salt Fork Township, Saline County, Missouri =

Inactive township in the US state of Missouri

Coordinates: 39.0239°N 93.1369°W

Salt Fork Township is an inactive township in Saline County, in the U.S. state of Missouri.

Salt Fork Township was erected in 1873, taking its name from a creek of the same name within its borders.
