= Blue Township, Jackson County, Missouri =

Inactive township in the US state of Missouri

Coordinates: 39°06′38″N 94°23′56″W

Blue Township is an inactive township in Jackson County, in the U.S. state of Missouri.

Blue Township was established in 1827, taking its name from the Blue River.

In 1930, the township included the city of Independence as well as the villages of Atherton, Sugar Creek, Courtney, Cement City, and East Independence.
