= Morley Township, Scott County, Missouri =

Township in Scott County, Missouri, U.S.

Coordinates: 37.0183°N 89.6367°W

Morley Township is an inactive township in Scott County, in the U.S. state of Missouri.

Morley Township was erected in 1872, taking its name from the community of Morley, Missouri.
