= Liguori, Missouri =

Unincorporated community in Missouri, U.S.

Coordinates: 38.358°N 90.4229°W

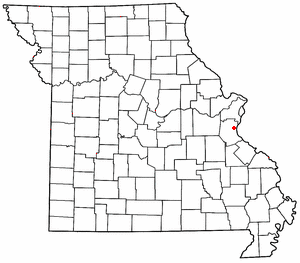

Liguori is an unincorporated community in Jefferson County, Missouri, United States. It is a part of the Greater St. Louis metropolitan area and is located approximately 10 miles south of Arnold on U.S. Route 67. The community is named after Saint Alphonsus Liguori, founder of the Congregation of the Most Holy Redeemer, and is the home of communities of Redemptorists and Redemptoristine nuns.
