= Big Prairie Township, New Madrid County, Missouri =

Township in New Madrid County, Missouri, U.S.

Coordinates: 36.7828°N 89.5578°W

Big Prairie Township is an inactive township in New Madrid County, in the U.S. state of Missouri.

Big Prairie Township takes its name from a prairie of the same name within its borders.
