= Bourbois Township, Gasconade County, Missouri =

Inactive township in the US state of Missouri

Coordinates: 38.1986°N 91.5886°W

Bourbois Township is an inactive township in Gasconade County, in the U.S. state of Missouri.

Bourbois Township was established in 1828, most likely taking its name the Bourbeuse River. Crops like soybeans are planted in the area.
