= Sylvania Township, Scott County, Missouri =

Township in Scott County, Missouri, U.S.

Coordinates: 37.0858°N 89.7053°W

Sylvania Township is an inactive township in Scott County, in the U.S. state of Missouri.

Sylvania Township was erected in 1871, and was named for the forestland (Latin: sylvania) within its borders.
