= Logan Township, Wayne County, Missouri =

Township in Wayne County, Missouri, U.S.

Coordinates: 37.1967°N 90.5739°W

Logan Township is an inactive township in Wayne County, in the U.S. state of Missouri.

Logan Township has the name of the local Logan family.
