= Grover Township, Johnson County, Missouri =

Township in Johnson County, Missouri, U.S.

Coordinates: 38.8721877°N 93.5521816°W

Grover Township is an inactive township in Johnson County, in the U.S. state of Missouri.

Grover Township was established in 1869, and named after B. W. Grover, a pioneer citizen.
