= Randolph Township, St. Francois County, Missouri =

Inactive township in the US state of Missouri

Coordinates: 37.8353°N 90.5878°W

Randolph Township is an inactive township in St. Francois County, in the U.S. state of Missouri.

Randolph Township was erected in 1858, taking its name from John Randolph of Roanoke.
