= Bethel Township, Shelby County, Missouri =

Inactive township in the American state of Missouri

Coordinates: 39.9008°N 92.0394°W

Bethel Township is an inactive township in Shelby County, in the U.S. state of Missouri.

Bethel Township was erected in the 1840s, and named after the community of Bethel, Missouri.
