= East Republic Township, Greene County, Missouri =

Township in the US state of Missouri

Coordinates: 37.1072°N 93.4625°W

East Republic Township is a township in Greene County, in the U.S. state of Missouri.

East Republic Township is named after the city within its boundaries.
