= St. Francois Township, St. Francois County, Missouri =

Inactive township in the US state of Missouri

Coordinates: 37.7981°N 90.4433°W

St. Francois Township is an inactive township in St. Francois County, in the U.S. state of Missouri.

St. Francois Township takes its name from the county in which it is located.
