= Bridgeport Township, Warren County, Missouri =

Inactive township in the US state of Missouri

Coordinates: 38.7741068°N 91.3599392°W

Bridgeport Township is an inactive township in Warren County, in the U.S. state of Missouri.

Bridgeport Township was erected in 1833, taking its name from the community of Bridgeport, Missouri.
