= Camp Branch Township, Cass County, Missouri =

Inactive township in the US state of Missouri

Coordinates: 38.6361°N 94.2353°W

Camp Branch Township is an inactive township in Cass County, in the U.S. state of Missouri.

Camp Branch Township was established in 1872, taking its name from Camp Branch creek.
