= Washington Township, Greene County, Missouri =

Township in Greene County, Missouri, U.S.

Coordinates: 37.1272°N 93.1178°W

Washington Township is an inactive township in Greene County, in the U.S. state of Missouri.

Washington Township has the name of President George Washington.
