= Montserrat Township, Johnson County, Missouri =

Inactive township in the US state of Missouri

Coordinates: 38.75°N 93.63°W

Montserrat Township is an inactive township in Johnson County, in the U.S. state of Missouri.

Montserrat Township was established in 1890, taking its name from the community of Montserrat, Missouri.
