= Union Township, Cass County, Missouri =

Township in Cass County, Missouri, U.S.

Coordinates: 38°43′04″N 94°33′56″W

Union is a township in Cass County, Missouri, south of Kansas City.

== Geography and Demographics ==
Land area: 30.1 sq. mi.
Water area: 0.1 sq. mi.
Population: 2,128 (all rural).
Males: 1,074.
Females: 1,054.
Races in Union township:

- White Non-Hispanic: 96.2%
- Black: 0.6%
- American Indian and Alaska Native: 0.9%
- Asian: 0.4%
- Two or more races: 1.0%
- Some other race: 0.0%
