= Piney Township, Pulaski County, Missouri =

Inactive township in the US state of Missouri

Coordinates: 37.6614°N 92.0897°W

Piney Township is an inactive township in Pulaski County, in the U.S. state of Missouri.

Piney Township was erected in 1853, taking its name from the Big Piney River.
