= Mount Pleasant Township, Cass County, Missouri =

Township in Cass County, Missouri, U.S.

Coordinates: 38.7936°N 94.5606°W

Mount Pleasant Township is a township in Cass County, in the U.S. state of Missouri.

Mount Pleasant Township takes its name from its location on a hill.
