= Boone Township, Douglas County, Missouri =

Township in Missouri, U.S.

Coordinates: 36°56′03″N 92°34′49″W

Boone Township is a township in central Douglas County, in the U.S. state of Missouri.
