= St. James Township, Mississippi County, Missouri =

Township in Mississippi County, Missouri, U.S.

Coordinates: 36.7886°N 89.3758°W

St. James Township is an inactive township in Mississippi County, in the U.S. state of Missouri.

St. James Township was established in 1836, taking its name from the St. James Bayou within its borders.
