= Vest Township, Scotland County, Missouri =

Township in Scotland County, Missouri, U.S.

Coordinates: 40.4614°N 92.3067°W

Vest Township is an inactive township in Scotland County, in the U.S. state of Missouri.

Vest Township was erected in 1891, taking its name from George Graham Vest, a United States Senator from Missouri.
