= Washington Township, Lafayette County, Missouri =

Inactive township in the U.S. state of Missouri

Coordinates: 39.0014°N 93.8631°W

Washington Township is an inactive township in Lafayette County, in the U.S. state of Missouri.

Washington Township has the name of President George Washington.
