= Canton Township, Lewis County, Missouri =

Inactive township in Missouri, U.S.

Coordinates: 40.1894°N 91.5675°W

Canton Township is an inactive township in Lewis County, in the U.S. state of Missouri.

Canton Township was established in 1830, taking its name from the community of Canton, Missouri.
