= Thayer Township, Oregon County, Missouri =

Inactive township in the U.S. state of Missouri

Coordinates: 36.5617°N 91.5322°W

Thayer Township is an inactive township in Oregon County, in the U.S. state of Missouri.

Thayer Township took its name from the community of Thayer, Missouri.
