= Black Creek Township, Shelby County, Missouri =

Inactive township in the American state of Missouri

Coordinates: 39.8225°N 92.0683°W

Black Creek Township is an inactive township in Shelby County, in the U.S. state of Missouri.

Black Creek Township was erected in the 1834, taking its name from Black Creek.
