= Pascola Township, Pemiscot County, Missouri =

Township in Pemiscot County, Missouri, U.S.

Coordinates: 36.26°N 89.86°W

Pascola Township is an inactive township in Pemiscot County, in the U.S. state of Missouri.

Pascola Township was erected in 1900, taking its name from the community of Pascola, Missouri.
