= Union Township, Ripley County, Missouri =

Township in Ripley County, Missouri, U.S.

Coordinates: 36.5531°N 90.9689°W

Union Township is an inactive township in Ripley County, in the U.S. state of Missouri.

Union Township was erected in 1871.
