= West Finley Township, Christian County, Missouri =

Township in Christian County, Missouri, U.S.

Coordinates: 36.998849°N 93.243002°W

West Finley Township is a township in central Christian County, Missouri.

The organization date and origin of the name of West Finley Township is unknown.
