= Sherman Township, Dallas County, Missouri =

Township in Dallas County, Missouri, U.S.

Coordinates: 37.85°N 93.00°W

Sherman Township is an inactive township in Dallas County, in the U.S. state of Missouri.

Sherman Township was established in 1870, taking its name from William Tecumseh Sherman, an officer in the Civil War.
