= Niangua Township, Webster County, Missouri =

Inactive township in the U.S. state of Missouri

Coordinates: 37.3889°N 92.7978°W

Niangua Township is an inactive township in Webster County, in the U.S. state of Missouri.

Niangua Township was formed on February 7, 1888, taking its name from the Niangua River.
