= Washington Township, Clay County, Missouri =

Township in Clay County, Missouri, U.S.

Washington Township
- Township
- Interactive map of Washington Township
- Coordinates: 39°24′07″N 94°16′15″W
- Country: United States
- State: Missouri
- County: Clay

Area
  - Total: 42.18 sq mi (109.2 km^{2})
  - Land: 41.9 sq mi (109 km^{2})
  - Water: 0.28 sq mi (0.73 km^{2}) 0.66%
- Elevation: 988 ft (301 m)

Population (2020)
  - Total: 4,756
  - Density: 113.5/sq mi (43.8/km^{2})
- FIPS code: 29-04777308
- GNIS feature ID: 766510

Washington Township is a township in Clay County, Missouri, United States. At the 2020 census, its population was 4,756.

Washington Township was erected in 1830, most likely taking its name from President George Washington.
