= Lebanon Township, Cooper County, Missouri =

Township in the U.S. state of Missouri

Lebanon Township
- Township
- Location in Cooper County
- Coordinates: 38°45′01″N 92°56′31″W
- Country: United States
- State: Missouri
- County: Cooper

Area
  - Total: 42.31 sq mi (109.59 km^{2})
  - Land: 42.31 sq mi (109.58 km^{2})
  - Water: 0.0039 sq mi (0.01 km^{2}) 0.01%
- Elevation: 846 ft (258 m)

Population (2000)
  - Total: 333
  - Density: 7.8/sq mi (3/km^{2})
- Time zone: UTC-6 (CST)
  - Summer (DST): UTC-5 (CDT)
- ZIP codes: 65237, 65276, 65348, 65354
- GNIS feature ID: 0766532

Lebanon Township is one of fourteen townships in Cooper County, Missouri, USA. As of the 2000 census, its population was 333.

Lebanon Township was established in the 1820s.

== Geography ==
According to the United States Census Bureau, Lebanon Township covers an area of 42.31 square miles (109.59 square kilometers).

=== Unincorporated towns ===
- New Lebanon at 38.763908°N 92.939363°W

(This list is based on USGS data and may include former settlements.)

=== Extinct towns ===
- Byberry at 38.691687°N 92.927697°W

(These towns are listed as "historical" by the USGS.)

=== Adjacent townships ===
- Palestine Township (northeast)
- Kelly Township (east)
- Mill Creek Township, Morgan County (south)
- Richland Township, Morgan County (southwest)
- Otterville Township (west)
- Clear Creek Township (northwest)

=== Cemeteries ===
The township contains Antioch Cemetery.

=== Major highways ===
- U.S. Route 50
- Route 135

== School districts ==
- Cooper County C-4
- Moniteau County R-Vi School District
- Otterville R-Vi
- Pilot Grove C-4

== Political districts ==
- Missouri's 6th congressional district
- State House District 117
- State Senate District 21
