= North River Township, Shelby County, Missouri =

Township in Shelby County, Missouri, U.S.

Coordinates: 39.8056°N 91.8708°W

North River Township is an inactive township in Shelby County, in the U.S. state of Missouri.

North River Township was erected in the 1834, taking its name from the North River.
