= Meramec Township, Phelps County, Missouri =

Inactive township in the US state of Missouri

Coordinates: 37.8781°N 91.5686°W

Meramec Township is an inactive township in Phelps County, in the U.S. state of Missouri.

Meramec Township was erected in 1857, taking its name from the Meramec River.
