= Boulware Township, Gasconade County, Missouri =

Township in the American state of Missouri

Coordinates: 38.4997°N 91.5608°W

Boulware Township is an inactive township in Gasconade County, in the U.S. state of Missouri.

Boulware Township was named after Philip Boulware, a county official.
