= Thomas Township, Ripley County, Missouri =

Township in Ripley County, Missouri, U.S.

Coordinates: 36.5492°N 90.6247°W

Thomas Township is an inactive township in Ripley County, in the U.S. state of Missouri.

Thomas Township was erected in 1872, taking its name from Ad Thomas, a pioneer citizen.
