= Salem Township, Lewis County, Missouri =

Inactive township in the US state of Missouri

Coordinates: 40.0017°N 91.8681°W

Salem Township is an inactive township in Lewis County, in the U.S. state of Missouri.

Salem Township was established in 1841, taking its name from a local church of the same name.
