= Thomson Township, Scotland County, Missouri =

Township in Scotland County, Missouri, U.S.

Coordinates: 40.4597°N 92.0083°W

Thomson Township is an inactive township in Scotland County, in the U.S. state of Missouri.

Thomson Township was erected in 1888, and named after the local Thomson family.
