= Roubidoux Township, Pulaski County, Missouri =

Inactive township in the US state of Missouri

Coordinates: 37.6803°N 92.2242°W

Roubidoux Township is an inactive township in Pulaski County, in the U.S. state of Missouri.

Roubidoux Township takes its name from Roubidoux Creek.
