= Carroll Township, Reynolds County, Missouri =

Inactive township in the American state of Missouri

Coordinates: 37.4828°N 91.0994°W

Carroll Township is an inactive township in Reynolds County, in the U.S. state of Missouri.

Carroll Township was erected in 1845.
