= St. John Township, New Madrid County, Missouri =

Township in New Madrid County, Missouri, U.S.

Coordinates: 36.5925°N 89.4219°W

St. John Township is an inactive township in New Madrid County, in the U.S. state of Missouri.

St. John Township takes its name from St. John Bayou.
