= Champion Township, Douglas County, Missouri =

Township in Missouri, U.S.

Coordinates: 36°55′50″N 92°21′49″W

Champion Township is a township in central Douglas County, in the U.S. state of Missouri.
