= Findley Township, Douglas County, Missouri =

Township in Missouri, U.S.

Coordinates: 37°01′24″N 92°41′12″W

Findley Township is a township in northern Douglas County, in the U.S. state of Missouri.
