= Richland Township, Ozark County, Missouri =

Township in Ozark County, Missouri, U.S.

Coordinates: 36.7383°N 92.2392°W

Richland Township is an inactive township in Ozark County, in the U.S. state of Missouri.

Richland Township was erected in 1860, taking its name from the local Richland family.
