= Wood Township, Douglas County, Missouri =

Township in Missouri, U.S.

Coordinates: 37°00′57″N 92°15′08″W

Wood Township is a township in eastern Douglas County, in the U.S. state of Missouri.
