= Spring Valley Township, Shannon County, Missouri =

Inactive township in the American state of Missouri

Coordinates: 37.2142°N 91.5839°W

Spring Valley Township is an inactive township in Shannon County, in the U.S. state of Missouri.

Spring Valley Township was erected in 1842, and named for a valley containing springs within its borders.
