= Wolf Island Township, Mississippi County, Missouri =

Township in Mississippi County, Missouri, U.S.

Coordinates: 36.7325°N 89.2569°W

Wolf Island Township is an inactive township in Mississippi County, in the U.S. state of Missouri.

Wolf Island Township was established in 1845, taking its name from an island of the same name in the Mississippi River.
