= Hayti Township, Pemiscot County, Missouri =

Inactive township in the US state of Missouri

Coordinates: 36.223213°N 89.754404°W

Hayti Township is an inactive township in Pemiscot County, in the U.S. state of Missouri.

Hayti Township takes its name from the community of Hayti, Missouri.
