= Peculiar Township, Cass County, Missouri =

Township in Cass County, Missouri, U.S.

Coordinates: 38.7014°N 94.3539°W

Peculiar Township is an inactive township in Cass County, in the U.S. state of Missouri.

Peculiar Township was established in 1872, taking its name from Peculiar, Missouri.
