= Seneca Township, Newton County, Missouri =

Township in Newton County, Missouri, USA

Coordinates: 36.8733°N 94.5889°W

Seneca Township is an inactive township in Newton County, in the U.S. state of Missouri.

Seneca Township derives its name from the community of Seneca, Missouri.
