= South Fork Township, Monroe County, Missouri =

Township in Monroe County, Missouri, U.S.

Coordinates: 39.3825°N 91.8397°W

South Fork Township is an inactive township in Monroe County, in the U.S. state of Missouri.

It was established in 1834, taking its name from South Fork Salt River.
