= Union Township, Lincoln County, Missouri =

Township in Lincoln County, Missouri, United States

Coordinates: 39.12°N 91.00°W

Union Township is an inactive township in Lincoln County, in the U.S. state of Missouri.

Union Township was established in 1819.
