= Washington Township, Pettis County, Missouri =

Township in Pettis County, Missouri, U.S.

Coordinates: 38.5681°N 93.3444°W

Washington Township is an inactive township in Pettis County, in the U.S. state of Missouri.

Washington Township has the name of President George Washington.
