= Walls Township, Douglas County, Missouri =

Township in Missouri, U.S.

Coordinates: 36°50′48″N 92°34′58″W

Walls Township is a township in central Douglas County, in the U.S. state of Missouri.
