= Dawt, Missouri =

- Community
- Location of Dawt, Missouri Dawt, Missouri (the United States)
- Coordinates: 36°36′36″N 92°16′37″W
- Country: United States
- State: Missouri
- County: Ozark County
- Time zone: UTC-6 (CST)
  - Summer (DST): UTC-5 (CDT)

Dawt is an unincorporated community in Ozark County, in the U.S. state of Missouri. Dawt or Dawt Mill is located on the east bank of the North Fork River just north (upstream) of Tecumseh. The Dawt Mill Resort, which offers float trips on the river, is located at the mill.

== History ==
A post office called Dawt was established in 1907, and remained in operation until 1934. It is unknown why the name "Dawt" was applied to this community.
