= Myrtle Township, Oregon County, Missouri =

Inactive township in the U.S. state of Missouri

Coordinates: 36.5297°N 91.2697°W

Myrtle Township is an inactive township in Oregon County, in the U.S. state of Missouri.

Myrtle Township took its name from the community of Myrtle, Missouri.
