= West Dolan Township, Cass County, Missouri =

Township in Cass County, Missouri, U.S.

Coordinates: 38.6217°N 94.5675°W

West Dolan Township is an inactive township in Cass County, in the U.S. state of Missouri.

West Dolan Township was established in 1873.
