= Delaware Township, Shannon County, Missouri =

Inactive township in the US state of Missouri

Coordinates: 37.0819°N 91.4322°W

Delaware Township is an inactive township in Shannon County, in the U.S. state of Missouri.

Delaware Township was established in 1870, and named after the Delaware people.
