= Hermitage Township, Hickory County, Missouri =

Township in Missouri, U.S.

Coordinates: 37°56′33″N 93°20′29″W

Hermitage Township is a township in central Hickory County, in the U.S. state of Missouri.

Hermitage Township was named after the city of Hermitage.
