= Chilhowee Township, Johnson County, Missouri =

Township in Johnson County, Missouri, U.S.

Coordinates: 38.6213294°N 93.8694493°W

Chilhowee Township is an inactive township in Johnson County, in the U.S. state of Missouri.

Chilhowee Township was established in 1868, taking its name from the community of Chilhowee, Missouri.
