= Le Sieur Township, New Madrid County, Missouri =

Township in New Madrid County, Missouri, U.S.

Coordinates: 36°26′26″N 89°34′50″W

Le Sieur Township is a township in New Madrid County, in the U.S. state of Missouri. Its population was 585 as of the 2010 census.
