= Miller Township, Phelps County, Missouri =

Inactive township in the American state of Missouri

Coordinates: 38.01°N 91.85°W

Miller Township is an inactive township in Phelps County, in the U.S. state of Missouri.

Miller Township has the name of Hamilton Miller, a local jurist.
