= Moreland Township, Scott County, Missouri =

Township in Scott County, Missouri, U.S.

Coordinates: 37.0981°N 89.5561°W

Moreland Township is an inactive township in Scott County, in the U.S. state of Missouri.

Moreland Township was erected in 1822, and named after a pioneer citizen.
