= Miami Township, Saline County, Missouri =

Inactive township in the US state of Missouri

Coordinates: 39.2864°N 93.2067°W

Miami Township is an inactive township in Saline County, in the U.S. state of Missouri.

Miami Township was erected in 1822, taking its name from the community of Miami, Missouri.
