= Portage Township, New Madrid County, Missouri =

Township in New Madrid County, Missouri, U.S.

Coordinates: 36.4503°N 89.7747°W

Portage Township is an inactive township in New Madrid County, in the U.S. state of Missouri.

Portage Township was established in 1874, taking its name from Portage Bayou.
