= Prairie Township, Pettis County, Missouri =

Township in Pettis County, Missouri, U.S.

Coordinates: 38.6717°N 93.3403°W

Prairie Township is an inactive township in Pettis County, in the U.S. state of Missouri.

Prairie Township was erected in 1873, and named for the prairie within its borders.
