= Miller Township, Douglas County, Missouri =

Township in Missouri, U.S.

Coordinates: 37°01′18″N 92°34′42″W

Miller Township is a township in northern Douglas County, in the U.S. state of Missouri.
