= Montgomery Township, Wright County, Missouri =

Township in Wright County, Missouri, U.S.

Coordinates: 37.40°N 92.33°W

Montgomery Township is an inactive township in Wright County, in the U.S. state of Missouri.

Montgomery Township was erected in 1880, taking its name from the local Montgomery family.
