= Salt Springs Township, Randolph County, Missouri =

Inactive township in the US state of Missouri

Coordinates: 39.4372°N 92.5592°W

Salt Springs Township is an inactive township in Randolph County, in the U.S. state of Missouri.

Salt Springs Township was so named on account of brine springs in the area.
