= Upper Loutre Township, Montgomery County, Missouri =

Township in Montgomery County, Missouri, U.S.

Coordinates: 39.0925°N 91.5536°W

Upper Loutre Township is an inactive township in Montgomery County, in the U.S. state of Missouri.

Upper Loutre Township was established in 1818, taking its name from the Loutre River.
