= Bryan Township, Douglas County, Missouri =

Township in Missouri, U.S.

Coordinates: 36°55′43″N 92°15′17″W

Bryan Township is a township in eastern Douglas County, in the U.S. state of Missouri.
