= Sandywoods Township, Scott County, Missouri =

Township in Scott County, Missouri, U.S.

Coordinates: 36.9817°N 89.5131°W

Sandywoods Township is an inactive township in Scott County, in the U.S. state of Missouri.

Sandywoods Township was erected in 1822, and so named on account of sandy soil within its borders.
