= Perry Township, St. Francois County, Missouri =

Township in St. Francois County, Missouri, U.S.

Coordinates: 37.9081°N 90.5369°W

Perry Township is an inactive township in St. Francois County, in the U.S. state of Missouri.

Perry Township was erected in 1821, taking its name from Oliver Hazard Perry (1785–1819), American naval officer.
