= Cairo Township, Randolph County, Missouri =

Inactive township in Missouri

Coordinates: 39.5178°N 92.4461°W

Cairo Township is an inactive township in Randolph County, in the U.S. state of Missouri.

Cairo Township takes its name from the community of Cairo, Missouri.
