= Union Township, Iron County, Missouri =

Township in Iron County, Missouri, U.S.

Coordinates: 37.3383°N 90.6553°W

Union Township is an inactive township in Iron County, in the U.S. state of Missouri.

Union Township was established in 1857.
