= Dawson Township, Phelps County, Missouri =

Township in the American state of Missouri

Coordinates: 38.1028°N 91.5778°W

Dawson Township is an inactive township in Phelps County, in the U.S. state of Missouri.

Dawson Township has the name of William Dawson, a pioneer judge.
