= Aurora Township, Lawrence County, Missouri =

Inactive township in the US state of Missouri

Coordinates: 36.9908°N 93.7225°W

Aurora Township is an inactive township in Lawrence County, in the U.S. state of Missouri.

Aurora Township took its name from the community of Aurora, Missouri.
