= West Peculiar Township, Cass County, Missouri =

Township in Cass County, Missouri, U.S.

Coordinates: 38.7092°N 94.4619°W

West Peculiar Township is an inactive township in Cass County, in the U.S. state of Missouri.

West Peculiar Township was established in 1873.
