= Kelly Township, Carter County, Missouri =

Township in Carter County, Missouri, U.S.

Coordinates: 36.8447°N 90.9889°W

Kelly Township is a township in Carter County, in the U.S. state of Missouri.
