= Pond Creek Township, Greene County, Missouri =

Inactive township in the US state of Missouri

Coordinates: 37.1469°N 93.5600°W

Pond Creek Township is an inactive township in Greene County, in the U.S. state of Missouri.

Pond Creek Township took its name from Pond Creek.
