= Falling Spring Township, Oregon County, Missouri =

Township in Oregon County, Missouri, U.S.

Coordinates: 36.8319°N 91.2817°W

Falling Spring Township is an inactive township in Oregon County, in the U.S. state of Missouri.

Falling Spring Township took its name from a cascading spring of the same name within its borders.
