= Godair Township, Pemiscot County, Missouri =

Township in Pemiscot County, Missouri, U.S.

Coordinates: 36.369172°N 89.717472°W

Godair Township is an inactive township in Pemiscot County, in the U.S. state of Missouri.

Godair Township has the name of the local Godair family.
