= Washington Township, Webster County, Missouri =

Inactive township in the U.S. state of Missouri

Coordinates: 37.4217°N 92.9381°W

Washington Township is an inactive township in Webster County, in the U.S. state of Missouri.

Washington Township was established February 6, 1856, taking its name from George Washington.
