= Prairie Township, McDonald County, Missouri =

Township in McDonald County, Missouri, United States

Coordinates: 36.5594°N 94.5833°W

Prairie Township is an inactive township in McDonald County, in the U.S. state of Missouri.

Prairie Township was established in 1866 (160 years ago), and named for the terrain common within its borders.
