= Richmond Township, Howard County, Missouri =

Township in Howard County, Missouri, U.S.

Coordinates: 39.1400°N 92.6836°W

Richmond Township is an inactive township in Howard County, in the U.S. state of Missouri.

Richmond Township was erected in 1821, taking its name from Richmond, in Virginia, the native state of a share of the first settlers.
