= Cuivre Township, Pike County, Missouri =

Inactive township in the U.S. state of Missouri

Coordinates: 39.3381°N 91.1894°W

Cuivre Township is an inactive township in Pike County, in the U.S. state of Missouri.

Cuivre Township was erected in 1820, taking its name from the North Fork Cuivre River.
