= Cassidy Township, Christian County, Missouri =

Township in Christian County, Missouri, U.S.

Coordinates: 37.0574°N 93.2402°W

Cassidy Township is a township in northern Christian County, Missouri.

The organization date and origin of the name of Cassidy Township is unknown, but there was a settlement located here named Cassidy with a post office established in 1884, which was apparently named after a railroad official.
