= Richwoods Township, Miller County, Missouri =

Township in Miller County, Missouri, U.S.

Coordinates: 38.0900°N 92.2939°W

Richwoods Township is an inactive township in Miller County, in the U.S. state of Missouri.

Richwoods Township was named for the forest and fertile soil within its borders.
