= Jim Henry Township, Miller County, Missouri =

Township in Missouri

Coordinates: 38.2886°N 92.3933°W

Jim Henry Township is an inactive township in Miller County, in the U.S. state of Missouri.

Jim Henry Township was established in 1838, and named after a local Native American tribal leader.
