= Cold Spring Township, Phelps County, Missouri =

Inactive township in the US state of Missouri

Coordinates: 37.8403°N 91.7600°W

Cold Spring Township is an inactive township in Phelps County, in the U.S. state of Missouri.

Cold Spring Township was erected in 1857, taking its name from the cold springs in the area.
