= Bayou II Township, Ozark County, Missouri =

Township in Ozark County, Missouri, U.S.

Coordinates: 36.6144°N 92.1739°W

Bayou II Township is an inactive township in Ozark County, in the U.S. state of Missouri.

Bayou II Township takes its name from Bayou Creek within its borders.
