= Washington Township, Ripley County, Missouri =

Township in Ripley County, Missouri, U.S.

Coordinates: 36.6372°N 90.6222°W

Washington Township is an inactive township in Ripley County, in the U.S. state of Missouri.

Washington Township was erected in 1871, taking its name from one President George Washington.
