= Woodside Township, Oregon County, Missouri =

Township in Oregon County, Missouri, U.S.

Coordinates: 36.8131°N 91.3881°W

Woodside Township is an inactive township in Oregon County, in the U.S. state of Missouri.

Woodside Township has the name of J. N. Woodside, an early settler.
