= Houstonia Township, Pettis County, Missouri =

Township in Pettis County, Missouri, U.S.

Coordinates: 38.8997°N 93.3433°W

Houstonia Township is an inactive township in Pettis County, in the U.S. state of Missouri.

Houstonia Township was erected in 1873, taking its name from the community of Houstonia, Missouri.
