= Washington Township, Stone County, Missouri =

Township in Stone County, Missouri, U.S.

Coordinates: 36.8011°N 93.4736°W

Washington Township is an inactive township in Stone County, in the U.S. state of Missouri.

Washington Township was erected in 1851, taking its name from President George Washington.
