= Oliver Township, Taney County, Missouri =

Township in Taney County, Missouri, U.S.

Coordinates: 36.5586°N 93.2550°W

Oliver Township is an active township in Taney County, in the U.S. state of Missouri.

Oliver Township is named for the local Oliver family.

The Ralph Foster Museum is within the township boundaries.
