= La Font Township, New Madrid County, Missouri =

Inactive township in the US state of Missouri

Coordinates: 36.5011°N 89.6550°W

La Font Township is an inactive township in New Madrid County, in the U.S. state of Missouri.

La Font Township was established in 1899, and named after Robert Lafont, a local judge.
