= Spencer Township, Pike County, Missouri =

Township in Pike County, Missouri, U.S.

Coordinates: 39.3942°N 91.3711°W

Spencer Township is an inactive township in Pike County, in the U.S. state of Missouri.

Spencer Township was erected in 1820, taking its name from Spencer Creek.
