= Mount Pleasant Township, Lawrence County, Missouri =

Township in Lawrence County, Missouri, U.S.

Coordinates: 37.0283°N 93.9978°W

Mount Pleasant Township is an inactive township in Lawrence County, in the U.S. state of Missouri.

Mount Pleasant Township took its name from the extinct town of Mount Pleasant.
