= Indian Township, Pike County, Missouri =

Township in Pike County, Missouri, U.S.

Coordinates: 39.2711°N 91.3719°W

Indian Township is an inactive township in Pike County, in the U.S. state of Missouri.

Indian Township was erected in 1842, taking its name from Indian Creek.
