= Richland Township, Gasconade County, Missouri =

Inactive township in the U.S. state of Missouri

Coordinates: 38.62°N 91.60°W

Richland Township is an inactive township in Gasconade County, in the U.S. state of Missouri.

Richland Township was established in 1846, and named for the richness of their soil.
