= Union Township, Randolph County, Missouri =

Inactive township in the U.S. state of Missouri

Coordinates: 39.4544°N 92.3475°W

Union Township is an inactive township in Randolph County, in the U.S. state of Missouri.

Union Township was named for the federal union.
