= Moreau Township, Cole County, Missouri =

Inactive township in the US state of Missouri

Coordinates: 38.5089°N 92.4100°W

Moreau Township is an inactive township in Cole County, in the U.S. state of Missouri.

Moreau Township was established in 1821, taking its name from the river of the same name within its borders.
