= Wood Township, Wright County, Missouri =

Township in Wright County, Missouri, U.S.

Coordinates: 37.23°N 92.32°W

Wood Township is an inactive township in Wright County, in the U.S. state of Missouri.

Wood Township was erected in 1880, taking its name from the local Wood family.
