= La Monte Township, Pettis County, Missouri =

Inactive township in the US state of Missouri

Coordinates: 38.7692°N 93.4408°W

La Monte Township is an inactive township in Pettis County, in the U.S. state of Missouri.

La Monte Township was erected in 1873, and named after the community of La Monte, Missouri.
