= Buchanan Township, Douglas County, Missouri =

Township in Missouri, U.S.

Coordinates: 36°52′26″N 92°52′50″W

Buchanan Township is a township in western Douglas County, in the U.S. state of Missouri.
