= Lyon Township, Lewis County, Missouri =

Township in Lewis County, Missouri, U.S.

Coordinates: 40.2014°N 91.6983°W

Lyon Township is an inactive township in Lewis County, in the U.S. state of Missouri.

Lyon Township was established in 1866, taking its name from Nathaniel Lyon (1818–1861), US Civil War general.
