= Cedar Bluff Township, Oregon County, Missouri =

Inactive township in the U.S. state of Missouri

Coordinates: 36.5556°N 91.1575°W

Cedar Bluff Township is an inactive township in Oregon County, in the U.S. state of Missouri.

Cedar Bluff Township was established in 1886, and named for a river bluff where cedar trees grew.
