= Logan Township, Reynolds County, Missouri =

Township in Reynolds County, Missouri, U.S.

Coordinates: 37.2353°N 90.9650°W

Logan Township is an inactive township in Reynolds County, in the U.S. state of Missouri.

Logan Township was erected in 1845, taking its name from James Logan, a pioneer citizen.
