= Post Oak Township, Johnson County, Missouri =

Inactive township in the US state of Missouri

Coordinates: 38.62°N 93.73°W

Post Oak Township is an inactive township in Johnson County, in the U.S. state of Missouri.

Post Oak Township was established in 1849, taking its name from Post Oak Creek.
