= Prairie Township, Randolph County, Missouri =

Township in Randolph County, Missouri, U.S.

Coordinates: 39.3219°N 92.4022°W

Prairie Township is an inactive township in Randolph County, in the U.S. state of Missouri.

Prairie Township was so named on account of a prairie within its borders.
