= Mountain Grove Township, Wright County, Missouri =

Township in Wright County, Missouri, U.S.

Coordinates: 37.1°N 92.3°W

Mountain Grove Township is an inactive township in Wright County, in the U.S. state of Missouri.

Mountain Grove Township was erected in 1855, taking its name from the community of Mountain Grove, Missouri.
