= Shoal Township, Clinton County, Missouri =

Township in Clinton County, Missouri, U.S.

Shoal Township
- Township
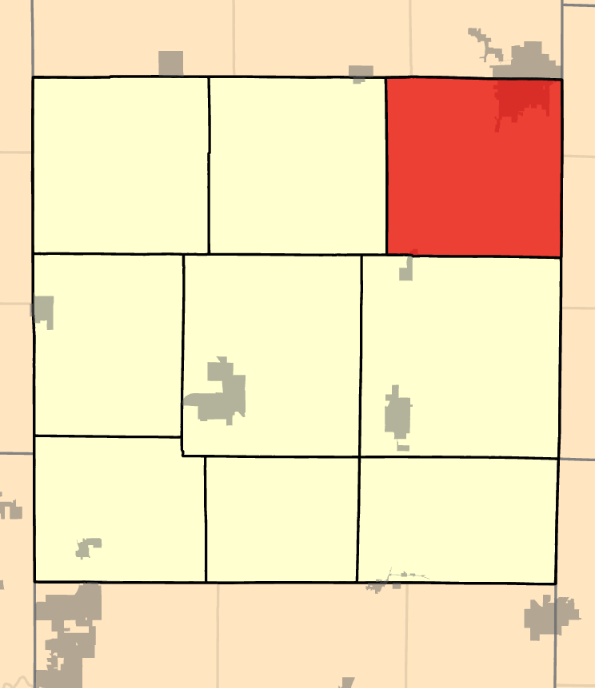
- Coordinates: 39°41′18″N 94°16′14″W
- Country: United States
- State: Missouri
- County: Clinton

Area
  - Total: 49.5 sq mi (128 km^{2})
  - Land: 49.45 sq mi (128.1 km^{2})
  - Water: 0.05 sq mi (0.13 km^{2}) 0.1%
- Elevation: 1,010 ft (310 m)

Population (2020)
  - Total: 6,275
  - Density: 126.9/sq mi (49.0/km^{2})
- FIPS code: 29-04967592
- GNIS feature ID: 766519

Shoal Township is a township in Clinton County, Missouri, United States. At the 2020 census, its population was 6,275.

Shoal Township took its name from Shoal Creek.
