= Spring Creek Township, Douglas County, Missouri =

Township in Missouri, U.S.

Coordinates: 36°50′55″N 92°41′29″W

Spring Creek Township is a township in southern Douglas County, in the U.S. state of Missouri.
