= Sheridan Township, Dallas County, Missouri =

Township in Dallas County, Missouri, U.S.

Coordinates: 37.452°N 93.110°W

Sheridan Township is an inactive township in Dallas County, in the U.S. state of Missouri.

Sheridan Township was established in 1870, taking its name from Philip Sheridan, an officer in the Civil War.
