= Little River Township, Pemiscot County, Missouri =

Inactive township in the US state of Missouri

Coordinates: 36.354013°N 89.858213°W

Little River Township is an inactive township in Pemiscot County, in the U.S. state of Missouri.

Little River Township takes its name from the Little River.
