= Blackwater Township, Pettis County, Missouri =

Township in Pettis County, Missouri, U.S.

Coordinates: 38.8769°N 93.4406°W

Blackwater Township is an inactive township in Pettis County, in the U.S. state of Missouri.

Blackwater Township takes its name from Blackwater River.
