= Union Township, Webster County, Missouri =

Union Township
- Coordinates: 37.4414°N 92.7647°W
- Country: United States
- State: Missouri
- County: Webster County
- Erected: May 22, 1855

Union Township is a township in Webster County, in the U.S. state of Missouri. Established in the 19th century.

Union Township was erected on May 22, 1855, and was named because they united several communities and towns to form the township.
