= Hurricane Township, Lincoln County, Missouri =

Township in Missouri, United States

Coordinates: 39.1649594°N 90.8359395°W

Hurricane Township is an inactive township in Lincoln County, in the U.S. state of Missouri.

Hurricane Township took its name from a former creek of the same name within its borders, where a hurricane had struck the area in 1798.
