= Washington Township, Osage County, Missouri =

Township in Osage County, Missouri, U.S.

Coordinates: 38.38°N 91.93°W

Washington Township is an inactive township in Osage County, in the U.S. state of Missouri.

Washington Township was erected in 1841, taking its name from George Washington, first President of the United States.
