= Flatwoods Township, Ripley County, Missouri =

Inactive township in the U.S. state of Missouri

Coordinates: 36.6611°N 90.6983°W

Flatwoods Township is an inactive township in Ripley County, in the U.S. state of Missouri.

Flatwoods Township was erected in 1910, taking its name from the community of Flatwoods, Missouri.
