= Brooking Township, Jackson County, Missouri =

Inactive township in the US state of Missouri

Coordinates: 38°59′24″N 94°28′28″W

Brooking Township is an inactive township in Jackson County, in the U.S. state of Missouri.

Brooking Township was established in 1872, taking its name from Alvin Brooking, a state legislator.

The township includes Raytown and environs, including a northwestern portion of Unity Village.
