= Lesterville Township, Reynolds County, Missouri =

Township in Reynolds County, Missouri, U.S.

Coordinates: 37.4831°N 90.8025°W

Lesterville Township is an inactive township in Reynolds County, in the U.S. state of Missouri.

Lesterville Township was erected in 1872, taking its name from the community of Lesterville, Missouri.
