= Camp Branch Township, Warren County, Missouri =

Township in Warren County, Missouri, U.S.

Coordinates: 38.922616°N 91.2005596°W

Camp Branch Township is an inactive township in Warren County, in the U.S. state of Missouri.

Camp Branch Township was erected in 1833, taking its name from the creek of the same name within its borders.
