= Northview Township, Christian County, Missouri =

Township in Christian County, Missouri, U.S.

Coordinates: 37.0685°N 93.2797°W

Northview Township is a township in northern Christian County, Missouri.

The organization date and origin of the name of Northview Township is unknown.
