= Gasconade Township, Wright County, Missouri =

Township in Wright County, Missouri, U.S.

Coordinates: 37.2073252°N 92.5987975°W

Gasconade Township is an inactive township in Wright County, in the U.S. state of Missouri.

Gasconade Township was established in 1855, taking its name from the Gasconade River.
