= St. James Township, Phelps County, Missouri =

Township in the American state of Missouri

Coordinates: 38.0056°N 91.5794°W

St. James Township is an inactive township in Phelps County, in the U.S. state of Missouri.

St. James Township takes its name from the community of St. James, Missouri.
