= Ashley Township, Pike County, Missouri =

Inactive township in Missouri

Coordinates: 39.2519°N 91.2144°W

Ashley Township is an inactive township in Pike County, in the U.S. state of Missouri.

Ashley Township was erected in 1852, taking its name from the community of Ashley, Missouri.
