= Montgomery Township, Montgomery County, Missouri =

Township in Montgomery County, Missouri, U.S.

Coordinates: 39.0014°N 91.5083°W

Montgomery Township is an inactive township in Montgomery County, in the U.S. state of Missouri.

Montgomery Township was established in 1872, taking its name from Montgomery City, Missouri.
