= Lentner Township, Shelby County, Missouri =

Inactive township in the American state of Missouri

Coordinates: 39.7189°N 92.1447°W

Lentner Township is an inactive township in Shelby County, in the U.S. state of Missouri.

Lentner Township was erected in the 1897, and named after the community of Lentner, Missouri.
