= Varner Township, Ripley County, Missouri =

Township in Ripley County, Missouri, U.S.

Coordinates: 36.5842°N 90.6881°W

Varner Township is an inactive township in Ripley County, in the U.S. state of Missouri.

Varner Townshipwas erected in 1890, taking its name from one Mr. Varner, an early settler.
