= Cowan Township, Wayne County, Missouri =

Inactive township in Missouri, U.S.

Coordinates: 37.2144°N 90.2883°W

Cowan Township is an inactive township in Wayne County, in the U.S. state of Missouri.

Cowan Township has the name of Richard "Uncle Dicky" Cowan, a pioneer settler.
