= North Benton Township, Dallas County, Missouri =

Inactive civil township in the American state of Missouri

Coordinates: 37.68213°N 93.09274°W

North Benton Township is an inactive township in Dallas County, in the U.S. state of Missouri.

North Benton Township was named for the fact the township formerly was the northern part of the now-defunct Benton Township.
