= Snow Hill Township, Lincoln County, Missouri =

Township in Missouri, United States

Coordinates: 39.0543°N 90.8700°W

Snow Hill Township is an inactive township in Lincoln County, in the U.S. state of Missouri.

Snow Hill Township was established in 1875.
