= Richland Township, Douglas County, Missouri =

Township in Missouri, U.S.

Coordinates: 36°50′20″N 92°08′55″W

Richland Township is a township in eastern Douglas County, in the U.S. state of Missouri.
