= Poynor Township, Ripley County, Missouri =

Inactive township in the U.S. state of Missouri

Coordinates: 36.5317°N 90.9017°W

Poynor Township is an inactive township in Ripley County, in the U.S. state of Missouri.

Poynor Township was erected in 1920, and named after the community of Poynor, Missouri.
