= Washington Township, Cedar County, Missouri =

Inactive township in the US state of Missouri

Coordinates: 37.78°N 93.78°W

Washington Township is an inactive township in Cedar County, in the U.S. state of Missouri.

Washington Township was established in the 1850s, taking its name from President George Washington.
