= McMurtrey Township, Douglas County, Missouri =

Township in Missouri, U.S.

Coordinates: 36°55′55″N 92°28′19″W

McMurtrey Township is a township in central Douglas County, in the U.S. state of Missouri.
