= Gatewood Township, Ripley County, Missouri =

Township in Ripley County, Missouri, U.S.

Coordinates: 36.5631°N 91.0744°W

Gatewood Township is an inactive township in Ripley County, in the U.S. state of Missouri.

Gatewood Township was erected in 1882, taking its name from the community of Gatewood, Missouri.
