= River View Township, Jefferson County, Missouri =

Township in Missouri, U.S.

Coordinates: 38°13′18″N 90°23′47″W

River View Township
- Township
- Interactive map of River View Township
- Country: United States of America
- State: Missouri
- County: Jefferson
- GNIS feature ID: 2397861

River View Township is a township in eastern Jefferson County, in the U.S. state of Missouri along the Mississippi River. The township contains portions of Crystal City, Festus, and Herculaneum.
