= Turnback Township, Lawrence County, Missouri =

Township in Lawrence County, Missouri, U.S.

Coordinates: 37.1186°N 93.6575°W

Turnback Township is an inactive township in Lawrence County, in the U.S. state of Missouri.

Turnback Township was named after Turnback Creek.
