= Anderson East Township, McDonald County, Missouri =

Township in the US state of Missouri

Coordinates: 36.6567°N 94.4197°W

Anderson East Township is a township in McDonald County, in the U.S. state of Missouri, which takes its name from the town of Anderson, Missouri.
