= Pontiac Township, Ozark County, Missouri =

Township in Ozark County, Missouri, U.S.

Coordinates: 36°31′2″N 92°33′12″W

Pontiac Township is a township in Ozark County, in the U.S. state of Missouri.

Pontiac Township takes its name from the Ottawa Indian chief Pontiac.
