= Union Township, Lewis County, Missouri =

Township in the US state of Missouri

Coordinates: 40.0161°N 91.5422°W

Union Township is a township in Lewis County, in the U.S. state of Missouri.

Union Township was established in 1833.
