= Miller Township, Scotland County, Missouri =

Township in Scotland County, Missouri, U.S.

Coordinates: 40.5525°N 92.3072°W

Miller Township is an inactive township in Scotland County, in the U.S. state of Missouri.

Miller Township was erected in 1842.
