= Norman Township, Dent County, Missouri =

Inactive township in the American state of Missouri

Coordinates: 37.74°N 91.60°W

Norman Township is an inactive township in Dent County, in the U.S. state of Missouri.

Norman Township was established in 1866, taking its name from Norman Creek.
