= Washington Township, Monroe County, Missouri =

Township in Monroe County, Missouri, U.S.

Coordinates: 39.6358°N 91.9419°W

Washington Township is an inactive township in Monroe County, in the U.S. state of Missouri.

Washington Township was established in 1833, taking its name from President George Washington.
