= Third Creek Township, Gasconade County, Missouri =

Township in the American state of Missouri

Coordinates: 38.38°N 91.60°W

Third Creek Township is an inactive township in Gasconade County, in the U.S. state of Missouri.

Third Creek Township was established in 1841, and named after Third Creek.
