= South Benton Township, Dallas County, Missouri =

Inactive township in the US state of Missouri

Coordinates: 37.62°N 93.11°W

South Benton Township is an inactive township in Dallas County, in the U.S. state of Missouri.

South Benton Township was named for the fact the township formerly was the southern part of the now-defunct Benton Township.
