= Silver Creek Township, Randolph County, Missouri =

Inactive township in the US state of Missouri

Coordinates: 39.3494°N 92.6361°W

Silver Creek Township is an inactive township in Randolph County, in the U.S. state of Missouri.

Silver Creek Township takes its name from Silver Creek.

== Demographics ==
According to the 2020 census, there are 320 people residing in the area. The population density is 2.61 inhabitants/km². 93.75 % of the inhabitants are White, 0.31 % are African American, 0.31 % are American Indian, 0.63 % are Pacific Islander, 1.25 % are of other races, and 3.75 % are of a mixture of races. Of the total population, 4.38% is Hispanic or Latino of any race.
