= Marshall Township, Saline County, Missouri =

Inactive township in the US state of Missouri

Coordinates: 39.1231°N 93.2000°W

Marshall Township is an inactive township in Saline County, in the U.S. state of Missouri.

Marshall Township was erected in 1841, taking its name from the community of Marshall, Missouri.
