= Newtonia Township, Newton County, Missouri =

Township in Newton County, Missouri, U.S.

Coordinates: 36.8697°N 94.1564°W

Newtonia Township is an inactive township in Newton County, in the U.S. state of Missouri.

Newtonia Township derives its name from the community of Newtonia, Missouri.
