= Sherman Township, Cass County, Missouri =

Township in Cass County, Missouri, U.S.

Coordinates: 38.5075°N 94.1072°W

Sherman Township is an inactive township in Cass County, in the U.S. state of Missouri.

Sherman Township was established in 1872, taking its name from William Tecumseh Sherman, a general in the American Civil War.
