= Arlington Township, Phelps County, Missouri =

Inactive township in the US state of Missouri

Coordinates: 37.9250°N 91.9519°W

Arlington Township is an inactive township in Phelps County, in the U.S. state of Missouri.

Arlington Township was erected in 1857, its name from the community of Arlington, Missouri.
