= Mine La Motte Township, Madison County, Missouri =

Township in Madison County, Missouri, U.S.

Coordinates: 37.6169°N 90.2853°W

Mine La Motte Township is an inactive township in Madison County, in the U.S. state of Missouri.

Mine La Motte Township was established in 1909, taking its name from Mine La Motte, Missouri.
