= Braggadocio Township, Pemiscot County, Missouri =

Inactive township in the US state of Missouri

Coordinates: 36.1903324°N 89.8839662°W

Braggadocio Township is an inactive township in Pemiscot County, in the U.S. state of Missouri.

Braggadocio Township takes its name from the community of Braggadocio, Missouri.

== Population ==
As of December 2018, Braggadocio township has a population of 592 people.
