= Elk Fork Township, Pettis County, Missouri =

Inactive township in the American state of Missouri

Coordinates: 38.6669°N 93.4419°W

Elk Fork Township is an inactive township in Pettis County, in the U.S. state of Missouri.

Elk Fork Township was erected in 1833, taking its name from the Elk Fork creek.
