= Washington Township, Douglas County, Missouri =

Township in Missouri, U.S.

Coordinates: 36°56′16″N 92°47′50″W

Washington Township is a township in western Douglas County, in the U.S. state of Missouri.
