= Taylor Township, Shelby County, Missouri =

Township in Shelby County, Missouri, U.S.

Coordinates: 39.9039°N 92.2058°W

Taylor Township is an inactive township in Shelby County, in the U.S. state of Missouri.

Taylor Township was named after President Zachary Taylor.
