= Peno Township, Pike County, Missouri =

Township in Pike County, Missouri, U.S.

Coordinates: 39.4925°N 91.2847°W

Peno Township is an inactive township in Pike County, in the U.S. state of Missouri.

Peno Township was erected in 1819, taking its name from Peno Creek.
