= Webb Township, Reynolds County, Missouri =

Inactive township in the US state of Missouri

Coordinates: 37.1894°N 90.8131°W

Webb Township is an inactive township in Reynolds County, in the U.S. state of Missouri.

Webb Township was erected in 1845, taking its name from the local Webb family.
