= Sand Hill Township, Scotland County, Missouri =

Township in Scotland County, Missouri, U.S.

Coordinates: 40.3586°N 92.1081°W

Sand Hill Township is an inactive township in Scotland County, in the U.S. state of Missouri.

Sand Hill Township was erected in 1852, taking its name from the community of Sand Hill, Missouri.
