= Tiger Fork Township, Shelby County, Missouri =

Township in Shelby County, Missouri, U.S.

Coordinates: 39.8878°N 91.9017°W

Tiger Fork Township is an inactive township in Shelby County, in the U.S. state of Missouri.

Tiger Fork Township took its name from the creek of the same name, Tiger Fork.
