= Miller Township, Maries County, Missouri =

Township in Maries County, Missouri, U.S.

Coordinates: 38.0947°N 92.1231°W

Miller Township is an inactive township in Maries County, in the U.S. state of Missouri.

Miller Township took its name from nearby Miller County.
