= Brush Creek Township, Douglas County, Missouri =

Township in Missouri, U.S.

Coordinates: 36°50′28″N 92°15′26″W

Brush Creek Township is a township in southeastern Douglas County, in the U.S. state of Missouri.
