= Alpine Township, Stone County, Missouri =

Inactive township in the US state of Missouri

Coordinates: 36.6208°N 93.5306°W

Alpine Township is an inactive township in Stone County, in the U.S. state of Missouri.

Alpine Township was erected in 1890, and so named on account of its lofty elevation.
