= Waverly Township, Lincoln County, Missouri =

Township in Lincoln County, Missouri, U.S.

Coordinates: 39°10′54″N 91°07′12″W

Waverly Township is an inactive township located in Lincoln County, in the U.S. state of Missouri.

It was established in 1825.
