= Vineyard Township, Lawrence County, Missouri =

Inactive township in the US state of Missouri

Coordinates: 37.1292°N 93.9867°W

Vineyard Township is an inactive township in Lawrence County, in the U.S. state of Missouri.

Vineyard Township took its name from the extinct community of Vineyard, which had the name of the local Vineyard family.
