= Cullen Township, Pulaski County, Missouri =

Inactive township in Missouri, U.S.

Coordinates: 37°48′23″N 92°09′09″W

Cullen Township is an inactive township in Pulaski County, in the U.S. state of Missouri.

Cullen Township was erected in 1833, taking its name from the local Cullen family.
