= Goebel Township, Oregon County, Missouri =

Township in Oregon County, Missouri, U.S.

Coordinates: 36.7256°N 91.2639°W

Goebel Township is an inactive township in Oregon County, in the U.S. state of Missouri.

Goebel Township was established in the 1910s, taking its name from William Goebel, 34th Governor of Kentucky.
