= Raymore Township, Cass County, Missouri =

Township in Cass County, Missouri, U.S.

Coordinates: 38.7964°N 94.4583°W

Raymore Township is a township in Cass County, in the U.S. state of Missouri. The township had 28,306 residents as of a 2015 estimate. The township borders Jackson County and includes the city of Raymore

Raymore Township was established in 1873.
