= Hawk Point Township, Lincoln County, Missouri =

Township in Lincoln County, Missouri, U.S.

Coordinates: 38.9820888°N 91.1219182°W

Hawk Point Township is an inactive township in Lincoln County, in the U.S. state of Missouri.

Hawk Point Township took its name from the community of Hawk Point, Missouri.
