= Riverside Township, Christian County, Missouri =

Township in Christian County, Missouri, U.S.

Coordinates: 37.0627°N 93.19761°W

Riverside Township is a township in northern Christian County, Missouri.

The organization date and origin of the name of Riverside Township is unknown.
