= West Republic Township, Greene County, Missouri =

Township in the US state of Missouri

Coordinates: 37.1503°N 93.4978°W

West Republic Township is a township in Greene County, in the U.S. state of Missouri.

West Republic Township is named after the city within its boundaries.
