= Pleasant Valley Township, Wright County, Missouri =

Township in Wright County, Missouri, U.S.

Coordinates: 37.11°N 92.64°W

Pleasant Valley Township is an inactive township in Wright County, in the U.S. state of Missouri.

Pleasant Valley Township was created in 1855, taking its name from an early Cumberland Presbyterian church of the same name.
