= Dry Creek Township, Maries County, Missouri =

Township in Maries County, Missouri, U.S.

Coordinates: 38.0569°N 92.0003°W

Dry Creek Township is an inactive township in Maries County, in the U.S. state of Missouri.

Dry Creek Township took its name from a creek of the same name within its borders.
