= Warrensburg Township, Johnson County, Missouri =

Inactive township in the US state of Missouri

Coordinates: 38.75°N 93.74°W

Warrensburg Township is an inactive township in Johnson County, in the U.S. state of Missouri.

Warrensburg Township was established in 1836, taking its name from the community of Warrensburg, Missouri.
