= Moore Township, Oregon County, Missouri =

Inactive township in the U.S. state of Missouri

Coordinates: 36.7939°N 91.5436°W

Moore Township is an inactive township in Oregon County, in the U.S. state of Missouri.

Moore Township has the name of John Moore, a pioneer citizen.
