= East Finley Township, Christian County, Missouri =

Township in Christian County, Missouri, U.S.

Coordinates: 36.98006°N 93.20380°W

East Finley Township is a township in central Christian County, Missouri.

The organization date and origin of the name of East Finley Township is unknown.
