= Como Township, New Madrid County, Missouri =

Inactive township in the US state of Missouri

Coordinates: 36.5639°N 89.8356°W

Como Township is an inactive township in New Madrid County, in the U.S. state of Missouri.

Como Township was established in 1888, taking its name from the community of Como, Missouri.
