= Danville Township, Montgomery County, Missouri =

Township in Montgomery County, Missouri, U.S.

Coordinates: 38.8783°N 91.5458°W

Danville Township is an inactive township in Montgomery County, in the U.S. state of Missouri.

Danville Township takes its name from the community of Danville, Missouri.
