= Winona Township, Shannon County, Missouri =

Winona Township
- Township
- Location in Missouri
- Coordinates: 37°00′37″N 91°20′12″W
- Country: United States
- State: Missouri
- County: Shannon

Area
  - Total: 152 sq mi (390 km^{2})
  - Land: 152 sq mi (390 km^{2})
- Elevation: 922 ft (281 m)
- Time zone: UTC-6 (CST)
  - Summer (DST): UTC-5 (CDT)
- FIPS code: 05-90123
- GNIS ID: 68757

Winona Township is an inactive township in Shannon County, Missouri, United States.
