= Hurley Township, Stone County, Missouri =

Inactive township in the US state of Missouri

Coordinates: 36.9189°N 93.4678°W

Hurley Township is an inactive township in Stone County, in the U.S. state of Missouri.

Hurley Township was erected in 1902, taking its name from the community of Hurley, Missouri.
