= Spring Creek Township, Ozark County, Missouri =

Township in Ozark County, Missouri, U.S.

Coordinates: 36.7039°N 92.1553°W

Spring Creek Township is an inactive township in Ozark County, in the U.S. state of Missouri.

Spring Creek Township was established in 1868, taking its name from the creek of the same name within its borders.
