= Doniphan Township, Ripley County, Missouri =

Township in Ripley County, Missouri, U.S.

Coordinates: 36.6350°N 90.8025°W

Doniphan Township is an inactive township in Ripley County, in the U.S. state of Missouri.

Doniphan Township was erected in 1871, taking its name from the community of Doniphan, Missouri.
