= Hughesville Township, Pettis County, Missouri =

Inactive township in Missouri, US

Coordinates: 38.8369°N 93.2958°W

Hughesville Township is an inactive township in Pettis County, in the U.S. state of Missouri.

Hughesville Township was erected in 1878, taking its name from the community of Hughesville, Missouri.
