= Marion Township, Monroe County, Missouri =

Township in Monroe County, Missouri, U.S.

Coordinates: 39.4894°N 92.2133°W

Marion Township is an inactive township in Monroe County, in the U.S. state of Missouri.

Marion Township was established in 1835, taking its name from Francis Marion, an officer in the Revolutionary War.
