= Dickerson Township, Lewis County, Missouri =

Township in Lewis County, Missouri, U.S.

Coordinates: 40.0822°N 91.6964°W

Dickerson Township is an inactive township in Lewis County, in the U.S. state of Missouri.

Dickerson Township was established in 1833, and named after Obadiah Dickerson, a pioneer citizen.
