= Palestine Township, Cooper County, Missouri =

Township in the U.S. state of Missouri

Palestine Township
- Township
- Location in Cooper County
- Coordinates: 38°51′16″N 92°50′31″W
- Country: United States
- State: Missouri
- County: Cooper

Area
  - Total: 44.97 sq mi (116.48 km^{2})
  - Land: 44.92 sq mi (116.34 km^{2})
  - Water: 0.058 sq mi (0.15 km^{2}) 0.13%
- Elevation: 745 ft (227 m)

Population (2000)
  - Total: 367
  - Density: 8.3/sq mi (3.2/km^{2})
- Time zone: UTC-6 (CST)
  - Summer (DST): UTC-5 (CDT)
- ZIP codes: 65233, 65237, 65276
- GNIS feature ID: 0766535

Palestine Township is one of fourteen townships in Cooper County, Missouri, USA. As of the 2000 census, its population was 367.

== Geography ==
According to the United States Census Bureau, Palestine Township covers an area of 44.97 square miles (116.48 square kilometers); of this, 44.92 square miles (116.34 square kilometers, 99.88 percent) is land and 0.06 square miles (0.15 square kilometers, 0.13 percent) is water.

=== Unincorporated towns ===
- Bellair at 38.833078°N 92.844359°W
- Speed at 38.848079°N 92.803247°W

(This list is based on USGS data and may include former settlements.)

=== Adjacent townships ===
- Boonville Township (northeast)
- Clark Fork Township (east)
- Kelly Township (south)
- Lebanon Township (southwest)
- Clear Creek Township (west)
- Pilot Grove Township (northwest)

=== Cemeteries ===
The township contains these three cemeteries: Briscoe, Concord and Concord.

=== Major highways ===
- Missouri Route 5

== School districts ==
- Boonville School District
- Cooper County C-4
- Pilot Grove C-4

== Political districts ==
- Missouri's 6th congressional district
- State House District 117
- State Senate District 21
