= Anderson West Township, McDonald County, Missouri =

Township in the US state of Missouri

Coordinates: 36.6700°N 94.4661°W

Anderson West Township is a township in McDonald County, in the U.S. state of Missouri.

Anderson West Township takes its name from the town of Anderson, Missouri.
