= Prairie Township, Montgomery County, Missouri =

Township in Montgomery County, Missouri, U.S.

Coordinates: 39.0958°N 91.3667°W

Prairie Township is an inactive township in Montgomery County, in the U.S. state of Missouri.

Prairie Township was established in 1818, and named for the prairie within its borders.
