= Walnut Grove Township, Greene County, Missouri =

Township in Greene County, Missouri, U.S.

Coordinates: 37.3917°N 93.5564°W

Walnut Grove Township is an inactive township in Greene County, in the U.S. state of Missouri.

Walnut Grove Township takes its name from the community of Walnut Grove.
