= Union Township, Monroe County, Missouri =

Township in Monroe County, Missouri, U.S.

Coordinates: 39.3969°N 92.2264°W

Union Township is an inactive township in Monroe County, Missouri, in the United States. It was established in 1831, and named for the federal union.
