= Hazelwood Township, Webster County, Missouri =

Township in Webster County, Missouri, U.S.

Coordinates: 37.2167°N 92.7231°W

Hazelwood Township is an inactive township in Webster County, in the U.S. state of Missouri.

Hazelwood Township was erected in 1855, taking its name from an extinct community of the same name, which in turn was named after a grove of hazelnut trees near the site. The first circuit court session was held at Hazelwood May 21, 1855 at that time the first County Seat with Judges R.J. Jameson, J.C. Trimble, and J.A. Goss Presiding; J.B. Love was Sheriff and John Foster Clerk.
