= Black River Township, Reynolds County, Missouri =

Inactive township in the US state of Missouri

Coordinates: 37.5550°N 90.9717°W

Black River Township is an inactive township in Reynolds County, in the U.S. state of Missouri.

Black River Township was erected in 1845, taking its name from the Black River.
