= Pierce Township, Stone County, Missouri =

Inactive township in the American state of Missouri

Coordinates: 36.8936°N 93.5608°W

Pierce Township is an inactive township in Stone County, in the U.S. state of Missouri.

Pierce Township was erected in 1853.
