= Hough Township, New Madrid County, Missouri =

Former township in Missouri

Coordinates: 36.7169°N 89.4556°W

Hough Township is an inactive township in New Madrid County, in the U.S. state of Missouri.

Hough Township was established in 1903, and named after Bottoly Hough, a businessperson in the local cooperage industry.
