= Williams Township, Stone County, Missouri =

Inactive township in the U.S. state of Missouri

Coordinates: 36.5464°N 93.5317°W

Williams Township is an inactive township in Stone County, in the U.S. state of Missouri.

Williams Township was erected in 1851, taking its name from John B. Williams, a county official.
