= Clark Fork Township, Cooper County, Missouri =

Township in the U.S. state of Missouri

Clark Fork Township
- Township
- Location in Cooper County
- Coordinates: 38°52′10″N 92°41′46″W
- Country: United States
- State: Missouri
- County: Cooper

Area
  - Total: 52.63 sq mi (136.32 km^{2})
  - Land: 52.60 sq mi (136.24 km^{2})
  - Water: 0.031 sq mi (0.08 km^{2}) 0.06%
- Elevation: 690 ft (210 m)

Population (2000)
  - Total: 598
  - Density: 11/sq mi (4.4/km^{2})
- Time zone: UTC-6 (CST)
  - Summer (DST): UTC-5 (CDT)
- ZIP codes: 65068, 65233, 65237
- GNIS feature ID: 0766528

Clark Fork Township is one of fourteen townships in Cooper County, Missouri, USA. As of the 2000 census, its population was 598.

Clark Fork Township was named after the creek of the same name within its borders.

== Geography ==
According to the United States Census Bureau, Clark Fork Township covers an area of 52.64 square miles (136.32 square kilometers); of this, 52.6 square miles (136.24 square kilometers, 99.94 percent) is land and 0.03 square miles (0.08 square kilometers, 0.06 percent) is water.

=== Unincorporated towns ===
- Clarks Fork at 38.886973°N 92.652688°W
- Lone Elm at 38.825024°N 92.736857°W

=== Adjacent townships ===
- Saline Township (northeast)
- Prairie Home Township (east)
- North Moniteau Township (southeast)
- Kelly Township (southwest)
- Palestine Township (west)
- Boonville Township (northwest)

=== Cemeteries ===
The township contains these two cemeteries: McCullough and Toler.

=== Major highways ===
- Missouri Route 87

== School districts ==
- Boonville School District
- Cooper County C-4
- Prairie Home R-V School District

== Political districts ==
- Missouri's 6th congressional district
- State House District 117
- State Senate District 21
