= Prairie Township, Howard County, Missouri =

Township in Howard County, Missouri, U.S.

Coordinates: 39.2547°N 92.7089°W

Prairie Township is an inactive township in Howard County, in the U.S. state of Missouri.

Prairie Township was named for the prairie lands within its borders.
