= Longrun Township, Ozark County, Missouri =

Township in Ozark County, Missouri, U.S.

Coordinates: 36.6522°N 92.7492°W

Longrun Township is an inactive township in Ozark County, in the U.S. state of Missouri.

Longrun Township was established in 1841, taking its name from the creek of the same name within its borders.
