= Madison Township, Johnson County, Missouri =

Township in Johnson County, Missouri, U.S.

Coordinates: 38.732°N 93.974°W

Madison Township is an inactive township in Johnson County, in the U.S. state of Missouri.

Madison Township was established in 1835, taking its name from President James Madison.
