= Washington Township, Jackson County, Missouri =

Inactive township in the US state of Missouri

Coordinates: 38°54′13″N 94°30′56″W

Washington Township is an inactive township in Jackson County, in the U.S. state of Missouri.

Washington Township was established in 1836, taking its name from President George Washington.

Most of the township was annexed to be included within the city limits of Kansas City sometime after 1930. In 1930, Washington Township included what corresponds now to the southern half of the part of Kansas City lying within Jackson County, and the villages within it were Dodson, Holmes Park, Dallas, Redbridge, Hickmans Mill, Santa Fe, Martin City, and Grandview (still a separate city from Kansas City as of 2018). An atlas showing the townships of Jackson County in 1930 is on page 2 at:

- (Jackson County, circa 1930): http://cdm.sos.mo.gov/cdm/ref/collection/moplatbooks/id/1537
