= South Elkhorn Township, Warren County, Missouri =

Township in Missouri, U.S.

Coordinates: 38.79°N 91.13°W

The South Elkhorn Township is a township located in Warren County in the State of Missouri.

== Population ==
In the year 2010 the township has 7249 inhabitants.

== Geography ==
The South Elkhorn Township has an area of 71.04 km2, 69.04 km2 is terrain and 2 km2 is water.
