= Middleton Township, Lafayette County, Missouri =

Inactive township in the U.S. state of Missouri

Coordinates: 39.1567°N 93.5339°W

Middleton Township is an inactive township in Lafayette County, in the U.S. state of Missouri.

Middleton Township was established in 1848, taking its name from the community of "Middleton", now known as Waverly.
