= Short Bend Township, Dent County, Missouri =

Inactive township in the American state of Missouri

Coordinates: 37.74°N 91.44°W

Short Bend Township is an inactive township in Dent County, in the U.S. state of Missouri.

Short Bend Township was established in 1873, taking its name from the community of Short Bend, Missouri.
