= Miller Township, Dallas County, Missouri =

Township in Dallas County, Missouri, U.S.

Coordinates: 37.8317°N 92.9212°W

Miller Township is an inactive township in Dallas County, in the U.S. state of Missouri.

Miller Township was established in 1841, and has the name of John R. Miller, an early settler.

It was a largely rural township and included the northeast corner of the county, close to the borders of both Camden and Laclede counties. It includes the communities of Easton (per US Census records from 1860) and Celt (per map at https://www.acrevalue.com/plat-map/MO/Dallas/)
