= Glaze Township, Miller County, Missouri =

Township in Missouri

Coordinates: 38.1325°N 92.5267°W

Glaze Township is an inactive township in Miller County, Missouri, United States.

Glaze Township was established in 1838, taking its name from the Grandglaize Creek.Some of its first settlers were the Gumm family.
