= Murray Township, Greene County, Missouri =

Township in Greene County, Missouri, U.S.

Coordinates: 37.3050°N 93.4547°W

Murray Township is an inactive township in Greene County, in the U.S. state of Missouri.

Murray Township has the name of the local Murray family.
