= New Madrid Township, New Madrid County, Missouri =

Inactive township in the US state of Missouri

Coordinates: 36.6453°N 89.5589°W

New Madrid Township is an inactive township in New Madrid County, in the U.S. state of Missouri.

New Madrid Township takes its name from the community of New Madrid, Missouri.
