= Spring River Township, Lawrence County, Missouri =

Inactive township in the US state of Missouri

Coordinates: 36.9636°N 93.8206°W

Spring River Township is an inactive township in Lawrence County, in the U.S. state of Missouri.

Spring River Township was named after the stream of the same name.
