= Spencer Township, Douglas County, Missouri =

Township in Missouri, U.S.

Coordinates: 37°00′16″N 92°52′38″W

Spencer Township is a township in western Douglas County, in the U.S. state of Missouri.
