= Bartlett Township, Shannon County, Missouri =

Inactive township in the American state of Missouri

Coordinates: 36.9683°N 91.4200°W

Bartlett Township is an inactive township in Shannon County, in the U.S. state of Missouri.

Bartlett Township was erected in 1905, taking its name the community of Bartlett, Missouri.
