= Hazel Hill Township, Johnson County, Missouri =

Inactive Missouri township

Coordinates: 38.878446°N 93.777649°W

Hazel Hill Township is an inactive township in Johnson County, in the U.S. state of Missouri.

Hazel Hill Township was established in 1856, and named for the hazel bushes near a local schoolhouse.
