= Lindsey Township, Benton County, Missouri =

Township in Benton County, Missouri, U.S.

Coordinates: 38.33806°N 93.38665°W

Lindsey Township is a township in western Benton County, in the U.S. state of Missouri.

Lindsey Township was organized in February 1835, being one of the original four townships of the county. The township was originally named Lindsay, after the county judge name John W. Lindsay.
