= Prairie Township, Lincoln County, Missouri =

Township in Lincoln County, Missouri, U.S.

Coordinates: 39.00°N 91.23°W

Prairie Township is an inactive township in Lincoln County, in the U.S. state of Missouri.

Prairie Township was established in 1848, and named for prairie land within its borders.
