= Centerview Township, Johnson County, Missouri =

Inactive township in the US state of Missouri

Coordinates: 38.7501856°N 93.8594326°W

Centerview Township is an inactive township in Johnson County, in the U.S. state of Missouri.

Centerview Township was established in 1870, taking its name from the community of Centerview, Missouri.
