= Meramec Township, Dent County, Missouri =

Township in Missouri, U.S.

Coordinates: 37°38′49″N 91°22′06″W

Meramec Township is a township in Dent County, in the U.S. state of Missouri.

Meramec Township was named after the Meramec River.
