= Rosedale Township, Christian County, Missouri =

Township in Christian County, Missouri, U.S.

Coordinates: 37.01536°N 93.33167°W

Rosedale Township is a township in west-central Christian County, Missouri.

The organization date and origin of the name of Rosedale Township is unknown.
