= Washington Township, Dallas County, Missouri =

Township in Dallas County, Missouri, U.S.

Coordinates: 37.51°N 92.91°W

Washington Township is an inactive township in Dallas County, in the U.S. state of Missouri.

Washington Township was established in 1841, taking its name from President George Washington.
