= Madison Township, Cedar County, Missouri =

Inactive township in the US state of Missouri

Coordinates: 37.62468°N 93.69166°W

Madison Township is an inactive township in Cedar County, in the U.S. state of Missouri.

Madison Township was established in the 1840s, taking its name from President James Madison.
