= West Township, New Madrid County, Missouri =

Inactive township in the US state of Missouri

Coordinates: 36.7806°N 89.6683°W

West Township is an inactive township in New Madrid County, in the U.S. state of Missouri.

The township was established in 1890.
