= Simpson Township, Johnson County, Missouri =

Inactive township in the US state of Missouri

Coordinates: 38.87°N 93.64°W

Simpson Township is an inactive township in Johnson County, in the U.S. state of Missouri.

Simpson Township was established in 1875, and named after James Simpson, a law enforcement agent.
