= Sinking Township, Dent County, Missouri =

Township in Dent County, Missouri, U.S.

Coordinates: 37.4642°N 91.3069°W

Sinking Township is an inactive township in Dent County, in the U.S. state of Missouri.

Sinking Township was erected in 1851, taking its name from Sinking Creek.
