= Woodlawn Township, Monroe County, Missouri =

Township in Monroe County, Missouri, U.S.

Coordinates: 39.5986°N 92.2114°W

Woodlawn Township is an inactive township in Monroe County, in the U.S. state of Missouri.

Woodlawn Township was established in 1854, taking its name from the community of Woodlawn, Missouri.
