= Mill Spring Township, Wayne County, Missouri =

Township in Wayne County, Missouri, U.S.

Coordinates: 37.0503°N 90.6647°W

Mill Spring Township is an inactive township in Wayne County, in the U.S. state of Missouri.

Mill Spring Township was erected in 1872, taking its name from the community of Mill Spring, Missouri.
