= Central Township, Madison County, Missouri =

Inactive township in the US state of Missouri

Coordinates: 37.4361°N 90.3736°W

Central Township is an inactive township in Madison County, in the U.S. state of Missouri.

Central Township was established in 1909, and named for the fact the geographical center of Madison County lies within its borders.
