= Grand Pass Township, Saline County, Missouri =

Township in Saline County, Missouri, U.S.

Coordinates: 39.2108°N 93.3781°W

Grand Pass Township is an inactive township in Saline County, in the U.S. state of Missouri.

Grand Pass Township was erected in 1841, taking its name from a mountain pass within its borders.
