= Arnold Township, Jefferson County, Missouri =

Township in Missouri, U.S.

Coordinates: 38°25′47″N 90°22′24″W

Arnold Township
- Township
- Interactive map of Arnold Township
- Country: United States of America
- State: Missouri
- County: Jefferson
- GNIS feature ID: 2397767

Arnold Township is a township in northeastern Jefferson County, in the U.S. state of Missouri. The township takes its name from the city of Arnold and its area is entirely coincident with the city's.
