= Moreau Township, Moniteau County, Missouri =

Inactive township in the American state of Missouri

Coordinates: 38.6261°N 92.6750°W

Moreau Township is an inactive township in Moniteau County, in the U.S. state of Missouri.

Moreau Township was established in 1845, taking its name from the Moreau River.
