= Moniteau Township, Howard County, Missouri =

Inactive township in the American state of Missouri

Coordinates: 39.0683°N 92.5800°W

Moniteau Township is an inactive township in Howard County, in the U.S. state of Missouri.

Moniteau Township was erected in 1821, taking its name from Moniteau Creek.
