= Big Creek Township, Madison County, Missouri =

Inactive township in the American state of Missouri

Coordinates: 37.3447°N 90.2519°W

Big Creek Township is an inactive township in Madison County, in the U.S. state of Missouri.

Big Creek Township was established in 1909, taking its name from Big Creek.
