= Little Prairie Township, Pemiscot County, Missouri =

Inactive township in the US state of Missouri

Coordinates: 36.154868°N 89.702793°W

Little Prairie Township is an inactive township in Pemiscot County, Missouri, United States.

Little Prairie Township derives its name from a translation of the French La Petite Prairie.
