= Salt River Township, Ralls County, Missouri =

Township in Ralls County, Missouri, U.S.

Coordinates: 39.4244°N 91.6689°W

Salt River Township is an inactive township in Ralls County, in the U.S. state of Missouri.

Salt River Township takes its name from the Salt River.
