= Red Oak Township, Lawrence County, Missouri =

Inactive township in the US state of Missouri

Coordinates: 37.2378°N 94.0050°W

Red Oak Township is an inactive township in Lawrence County, in the U.S. state of Missouri.

Red Oak Township was named after a creek of the same name where red oak timber was abundant.
