= Wilson Township, Greene County, Missouri =

Township in Greene County, Missouri

Coordinates: 37.1322731°N 93.3415778°W

Wilson Township is an inactive township in Greene County, in the U.S. state of Missouri.

Wilson Township was named after Wilsons Creek.
