= Virginia Township, Pemiscot County, Missouri =

Township in Pemiscot County, Missouri, U.S.

Coordinates: 36.12°N 89.88°W

Virginia Township is an inactive township in Pemiscot County, in the U.S. state of Missouri.

It is unclear why the name Virginia was applied to this township.
