= Ozark Township, Barton County, Missouri =

Township in the US state of Missouri

Ozark Township
- Township
- Location in Barton County
- Coordinates: 37°33′09″N 094°32′00″W
- Country: United States
- State: Missouri
- County: Barton

Area
  - Total: 38.55 sq mi (99.84 km^{2})
  - Land: 38.36 sq mi (99.35 km^{2})
  - Water: 0.19 sq mi (0.5 km^{2}) 0.5%
- Elevation: 889 ft (271 m)

Population (2000)
  - Total: 1,102
  - Density: 29/sq mi (11.1/km^{2})
- GNIS feature ID: 0766285

Ozark Township is a township in Barton County, Missouri, USA. As of the 2000 census, its population was 1,102.

The township takes its name from the Ozark Mountains.

== Geography ==
Ozark Township covers an area of 38.55 square miles (99.8 km^{2}) and contains two incorporated settlements: Burgess and Liberal. According to the USGS, it contains two cemeteries: Liberal and Yale.

The streams of East Drywood Creek, Fleck Creek and Second Nicolson Creek run through this township.
