= McKinley Township, Stone County, Missouri =

Township in Stone County, Missouri, U.S.

Coordinates: 36.8433°N 93.3883°W

McKinley Township is an inactive township in Stone County, in the U.S. state of Missouri.

McKinley Township was erected in 1902, taking its name from William McKinley, 25th President of the United States.
