= Salt River Township, Randolph County, Missouri =

Inactive township in the US state of Missouri

Coordinates: 39.5636°N 92.3483°W

Salt River Township is an inactive township in Randolph County, in the U.S. state of Missouri.

Salt River Township takes its name from the nearby Salt River.
