= Wilson Township, Dallas County, Missouri =

Township in Dallas County, Missouri, U.S.

Coordinates: 37.62°N 92.91°W

Wilson Township is an inactive township in Dallas County, in the U.S. state of Missouri.

Wilson Township was established in 1921, taking its name from President Woodrow Wilson.
