= Kelley Township, Ripley County, Missouri =

Township in Ripley County, Missouri, U.S.

Coordinates: 36.7478°N 90.9714°W

Kelley Township is an inactive township in Ripley County, in the U.S. state of Missouri.

Kelley Township was erected in 1871, and named after the local Kelley family.
