= Salt River Township, Knox County, Missouri =

Inactive township in the American state of Missouri

Coordinates: 39.9828°N 92.2492°W

Salt River Township is an inactive township in Knox County, in the U.S. state of Missouri.

Salt River Township was established in 1845, taking its name from the North Fork Salt River.
