= Spring Creek (Gasconade River tributary) =

Stream in the U.S. state of Missouri

Spring Creek is a stream in Maries and Phelps counties of Missouri. It is a tributary of Gasconade River.

The stream headwaters arise in Phelps County just northeast of Rolla near the Missouri Route V interchange on I-44 (at 37°59′03″N 91°43′44″W) and stream flows to the north-northwest passing under Missouri Route 63 about three miles north of Rolla. The stream enters Maries County near its midpoint, crosses under Missouri Route A and flows parallel to and just south of Route 63 again to its confluence with the Gasconade (at 38°08′38″N 91°52′54″W) about four miles southeast of Vienna.

Spring Creek was named for the fact there are abundant springs along its course.

== See also ==
- List of rivers of Missouri
