= Piney Township, Oregon County, Missouri =

Inactive township in the U.S. state of Missouri

Coordinates: 36.6789°N 91.4197°W

Piney Township is an inactive township in Oregon County, in the U.S. state of Missouri.

Piney Township takes its name from Piney Creek.
