= Moniteau Township, Randolph County, Missouri =

Inactive township in the American state of Missouri

Coordinates: 39.3222°N 92.5211°W

Moniteau Township is an inactive township in Randolph County, in the U.S. state of Missouri.

Moniteau Township takes its name from Moniteau Creek.
