= Freedom Township, Lafayette County, Missouri =

Township in Lafayette County, Missouri, U.S.

Coordinates: 38.9728°N 93.6200°W

Freedom Township is an inactive township in Lafayette County, Missouri.

Freedom Township was established in 1832, and named after the universal principle of freedom.
