= Windsor Township, Jefferson County, Missouri =

Township in Missouri, U.S.

Coordinates: 38°24′17″N 90°23′53″W

Arnold Township
- Township
- Interactive map of Arnold Township
- Country: United States of America
- State: Missouri
- County: Jefferson
- GNIS feature ID: 2397900

Windsor Township is a township in northeastern Jefferson County, in the U.S. state of Missouri. The township takes its name from the original settlement called Windsor Harbor at present-day Kimmswick. The Census-designated place of Imperial is located in this township along with the city of Kimmswick.
