= Ozark Township, Oregon County, Missouri =

Unincorporated community in the U.S. state of Missouri

Coordinates: 36.6775°N 91.1508°W

Ozark Township is an inactive township in Oregon County, in the U.S. state of Missouri.

Ozark Township took its name from the Ozark Land and Lumber Company.
