= Salt River Township, Pike County, Missouri =

Township in Pike County, Missouri, U.S.

Coordinates: 39.5314°N 91.1714°W

Salt River Township is an inactive township in Pike County, in the U.S. state of Missouri.

Salt River Township was erected in 1820, taking its name from the Salt River.
