= Ozark Township, Webster County, Missouri =

Defunct township in the U.S. state of Missouri

Coordinates: 37.33088°N 92.89851°W

Ozark Township is a defunct township in Webster County, in the U.S. state of Missouri.

Ozark Township was formed May 22, 1855, taking its name from the range of the same name.
