= Salt River Township, Shelby County, Missouri =

Township in Shelby County, Missouri, USA

Coordinates: 39.7142°N 92.0408°W

Salt River Township is an inactive township in Shelby County, in the U.S. state of Missouri.

Salt River Township was named after the North Fork Salt River.
