= Niangua Township, Camden County, Missouri =

Niangua Township
- Township
- Coordinates: 38°01′19″N 092°48′36″W
- Country: United States
- State: Missouri
- County: Camden

Area
  - Total: 20.70 sq mi (53.62 km^{2})
  - Land: 17.34 sq mi (44.91 km^{2})
  - Water: 3.36 sq mi (8.71 km^{2}) 16.24%
- Elevation: 748 ft (228 m)

Population (2000)
  - Total: 3,356
  - Density: 193/sq mi (74.7/km^{2})
- FIPS code: 29-52410
- GNIS feature ID: 0767575

Niangua Township is one of eleven townships in Camden County, Missouri, USA. As of the 2000 census, its population was 3,356.

The township was named after the Niangua River.

== Geography ==
Niangua Township covers an area of 20.7 square miles (54 km^{2}) and contains one incorporated settlement, Camdenton (the county seat). It contains three cemeteries: Laughlin, Tick Ridge and Union Electric.
