= Freistatt Township, Lawrence County, Missouri =

Township in Missouri

Coordinates: 37.0200°N 93.8883°W

Freistatt Township is an inactive township in Lawrence County, in the U.S. state of Missouri.

Freistatt Township took its name from the community of Freistatt, Missouri.
