= Smithton Township, Pettis County, Missouri =

Inactive township in the US state of Missouri

Coordinates: 38.6675°N 93.1150°W

Smithton Township is an inactive township in Pettis County, in the U.S. state of Missouri.

Smithton Township was erected in 1873, taking its name from the community of Smithton, Missouri.
