= Sugar Creek (Perche Creek tributary) =

Stream in the American state of Missouri

Coordinates: 39.200872°N 92.424068°W

Sugar Creek is a stream in Boone and Randolph Counties in the U.S. state of Missouri. It is a tributary of Perche Creek.

Sugar Creek was named for the sugar maple timber along its course.

== See also ==
- List of rivers of Missouri
