= McKinley Township, Polk County, Missouri =

Township in Polk County, Missouri, U.S.

Coordinates: 37.7519°N 93.3297°W

McKinley Township is an inactive township in Polk County, in the U.S. state of Missouri.

McKinley Township was erected in 1910, taking its name from President William McKinley.
