= Spring Creek (Dent County, Missouri) =

Stream in the U.S. state of Missouri

Spring Creek is a stream in Dent County in the U.S. state of Missouri. It is a tributary of Dry Fork.

The stream headwaters arise south of Salem just north of Missouri Route K and west of Missouri Route 19 (at 37°34′39″N 91°32′21″W). The stream flows to the north then turns east passing under route 19 on the south edge of Salem. It then turns north passing under Missouri Route 32 just east of Salem then turns northwest passing under combined routes 68-19. It continues to the northwest for about five miles to its confluence with Dry Fork (at 37°43′03″N 91°36′45″W).

Spring Creek was named for the fact it is a spring-fed stream at its source.

== See also ==
- List of rivers of Missouri
