= Pierce Township, Lawrence County, Missouri =

Inactive township in the US state of Missouri

Coordinates: 36.9569°N 93.9722°W

Pierce Township is an inactive township in Lawrence County, in the U.S. state of Missouri.

Pierce Township was named after the community of Pierce City, Missouri.
