= Walker Township, Moniteau County, Missouri =

Inactive township in the American state of Missouri

Coordinates: 38.6572°N 92.5092°W

Walker Township is an inactive township that is located in Moniteau County, in the U.S. state of Missouri.

Walker Township was established in 1845, and most likely was named after a pioneer citizen.

The township included the city of California.
