= Willow Fork Township, Moniteau County, Missouri =

Township in the American state of Missouri

Coordinates: 38.6175°N 92.7783°W

Willow Fork Township is a township in Moniteau County, in the U.S. state of Missouri.

Willow Fork Township was named for the stream of Willow Fork.
