= Kiheka Township, Camden County, Missouri =

Kiheka Township
- Township
- Coordinates: 38°01′47″N 092°41′03″W
- Country: United States
- State: Missouri
- County: Camden

Area
  - Total: 42.12 sq mi (109.08 km^{2})
  - Land: 41.61 sq mi (107.76 km^{2})
  - Water: 0.51 sq mi (1.32 km^{2}) 1.21%
- Elevation: 728 ft (222 m)

Population (2000)
  - Total: 4,237
  - Density: 102/sq mi (39.3/km^{2})
- FIPS code: 29-38585
- GNIS feature ID: 1729741

Kiheka Township is one of eleven townships in Camden County, Missouri, USA. As of the 2000 census, its population was 4,237.

== Geography ==
Kiheka Township covers an area of 42.12 square miles (109.1 km^{2}) and contains no incorporated settlements. It contains six cemeteries: Caviness, Davis, Hugo, Percival Memorial, Williams and Zion.

The stream of Watered Hollow Branch runs through this township.

== Transportation ==
Kiheka Township contains one airport or landing strip, Heritage Landing Strip.
