= Ozark Township, Lawrence County, Missouri =

Inactive township in the US state of Missouri

Coordinates: 37.2239°N 93.6817°W

Ozark Township is an inactive township in Lawrence County, in the U.S. state of Missouri.

Ozark Township derives its name from the Ozarks.
