= Linn Township, Moniteau County, Missouri =

Inactive township in the U.S. state of Missouri

Coordinates: 38.7864°N 92.4883°W

Linn Township is an inactive township in Moniteau County, in the U.S. state of Missouri.

Linn Township was established in 1845.

This historic township included Jamestown, the settlements of Sandy Hook and Lupus, and all of the Missouri River coastline of Moniteau County, across the river from the Boone County settlements of Easley and McBaine. The historic names among these are often critical in ascertaining historical events and birthplaces for genealogical data.

In historical and genealogical records, Linn Township of Moniteau, across from Boone County, has sometimes been confused with the city of Linn in Osage County, which is located eastward and beyond all of Cole County, and opposite Callaway County along the Missouri River coastline. This is one example among many of completely different towns and townships within the same state using the same name despite distances between them, and this complicated by the rare continued popular use of old township (county subdivision) names still appearing in historical records, nonetheless.

A map of Linn Township in Moniteau County can be found here: http://cdm16795.contentdm.oclc.org/cdm/ref/collection/moplatbooks/id/1258 .
