= Boonville Township, Cooper County, Missouri =

Township in the U.S. state of Missouri

Boonville Township
- Township
- Location in Cooper County
- Coordinates: 38°57′44″N 92°44′50″W
- Country: United States
- State: Missouri
- County: Cooper

Area
  - Total: 53.5 sq mi (138.5 km^{2})
  - Land: 51.83 sq mi (134.23 km^{2})
  - Water: 1.65 sq mi (4.27 km^{2}) 3.08%
- Elevation: 748 ft (228 m)

Population (2000)
  - Total: 9,898
  - Density: 191/sq mi (73.7/km^{2})
- Time zone: UTC-6 (CST)
  - Summer (DST): UTC-5 (CDT)
- ZIP code: 65233
- GNIS feature ID: 0766527

Boonville Township is one of fourteen townships in Cooper County, Missouri, USA. As of the 2000 census, its population was 9,898.

== Geography ==
According to the United States Census Bureau, Boonville Township covers an area of 53.47 square miles (138.5 square kilometers); of this, 51.82 sq mi (134.2 km^{2}, 96.92 percent) is land and 1.65 square miles (4.27 square kilometers, 3.08 percent) is water.

=== Cities, towns, villages ===
- Boonville
- Windsor Place

=== Unincorporated towns ===
- Billingsville at 38.903081°N 92.794356°W
- Merna at 38.971142°N 92.64963°W

(This list is based on USGS data and may include former settlements.)

=== Adjacent townships ===
- Franklin Township, Howard County (north)
- Moniteau Township, Howard County (northeast)
- Saline Township (east)
- Clark Fork Township (southeast)
- Palestine Township (southwest)
- Lamine Township (west)
- Pilot Grove Township (west)
- Boonslick Township, Howard County (northwest)

=== Cemeteries ===
The township contains Walnut Grove Cemetery.

=== Major highways ===
- Interstate 70
- U.S. Route 40
- Route 5
- Route 41
- Route 87
- Route 135

=== Airports and landing strips ===
- Jesse Viertel Memorial Airport

=== Landmarks ===
- Harley Park

=== Bodies of water ===
- Missouri River
  - Rupe Branch
  - Thomas Branch
- Lamine River
- Hickory Branch

== School districts ==
- Boonville School District

== Political districts ==
- Missouri's 6th congressional district
- State House District 117
- State Senate District 21
