= Missouri Route 87 =

State highway in Missouri, U.S.

Route 87
- MO 87 highlighted in red

Route information
- Maintained by MoDOT
- Length: 77.467 mi (124.671 km)

Major junctions
- South end: US 54 / Route M in Eldon
- US 50 in California US 50 Bus. in California; I-70 / I-70 BL in Windsor Place; US 40 / Route 5 Boonville-Franklin
- North end: Route 5 / Route 240 in Glasgow

Location
- Country: United States
- State: Missouri

Highway system
- Missouri State Highway System; Interstate; US; State; Supplemental
← Route 86	→ Route 88

Route 87 is a highway in central Missouri. Its southern terminus is at U.S. Route 54 in Eldon, and its northern terminus is at Route 5/240 in Glasgow. Parts of the road are overlapped by the Lewis and Clark Trail and Santa Fe Trail.

== Route description ==
Route 87 begins at an interchange along U.S. Route 54 (US 54) which is also shared by Route M. The route runs northwest and then curve west just before an abandoned Rock Island railroad crossing. The route continues west until it encounters the intersection with US 54 Business (US 54 Bus.), where it makes a right turn an runs northeast in a concurrency. At the intersection with Manor Drive, Route 87 leaves the concurrency with US 54 Bus. and travels straight north, along the east side of Eldon Model Airpark. The northern trajectory ends at the intersection of Boulder Road where Route 87 makes a right curve and resumes later at the blinker-light intersection with Route P, which leads east to Olean. Further north, it crosses a bridge over South Moreau Creek, and later the Miller–Moniteau county line. Within Moniteau County, and well as much of the route, the surroundings are primarily rural and agricultural, and the highway travels along various hills and ridges. Among the few developed communities, Route 87 travels east of High Point where the closest representation to a major intersection is a blinker-light intersection with Route C. The highway continues to meander through the rural agricultural hills of Central Missouri, until it approaches a partial cloverleaf interchange with US 50, the northwest quadrant of which includes a decorative welcome sign for California. North of there, Route 87 is named Oak Street. The route doesn't officially enter California until between the intersections with Kevin Street and Quail Hollow Road. With a few exceptions, the surroundings along Route 87 are primarily residential until the road approaches U.S. Route 50 Bus. Continuing through downtown California, it later it crosses a pair of railroad lines formerly owned by Missouri Pacific Railroad. At Main Street, Route 87 makes a right turn and Oak Street becomes Route O. It then travels along Main Street for two blocks, then turns north again at East Street. North of Walnut Street, the route curves northeast as it leaves the city limits and becomes Jamestown Road, resuming its run through the rural hills of Moniteau County. It travels through Kliever, and later crosses a bridge over Moniteau Creek. The highway enters Jamestown just as it curves to the west at South Mill Street (Route AA), then at the intersection with West Row Street joins up in a concurrency with Route 179. The two highways turn out of town back to the north and later the northwest. After the end of the concurrency with Route 179, Route 87 curves to the west. Between the intersections of two dirt roads, Homestead Road and Splice Creek Drive, it crosses the Moniteau–Cooper county line and enters Prairie Home. Shortly after the intersection with Route D, it turns northwest again, gradually curving toward the north after leaving that community and running through rural Cooper County.

In Windsor Place, Route 87 encounters an interchange with Interstate 70 (I-70) and is joined by the east end of Interstate 70 Business (BL I-70), with which it has a concurrency towards the northwest, passing by a golf course. Sparse development can be seen along the way, and further northwest the road serves as the western terminus of Route 98, joining part of the Lewis and Clark Trail. Entering Boonville, the highway becomes known as Bingham Road, which has more suburban surroundings. The highway later makes a right turn at Route B and becomes Main Street. Over two blocks later, the highway is joined by US 40, Route 5, and the Santa Fe Trail, which is where BL I-70 makes a left turn. US 40/Route 5/Route 87 travels north along Main Street through historic downtown Boonville, and after the intersection with High Street, crosses the Boonslick Bridge over the Missouri River, crossing the Cooper–Howard county line, entering Franklin. Immediately after crossing the bridge, Route 87 leaves the concurrency with US 40 and Route 5 and turns left, taking the Santa Fe Trail with it.

Route 87 and the Santa Fe Trail run in relative proximity to the north bank of the Missouri River crossing the Katy Trail State Park until just before the intersection with Howard County Road 339 (CR 339), and moves further away at the intersection with Route Z, which continues the previous trajectory towards Petersburg. From there, the road shifts at varying northwest angles. The road heads west-northwest as it enters Boonesboro and then has an overlap with Route J, which ends just after Route 87 makes a sharp right curve to the north. Well after leaving what passes for "downtown Boonesboro," it makes a long right curve as it approaches the east end of Route 187, which leads to the Boone's Lick State Historic Site. Turning back north, little else can be found as the road winds through the rural and agricultural lands of western Howard County, though near a USDA water tower are the intersections of Howard CR 316 and CR 314. North of Howard CR 308 is a bridge over Richland Creek with a church (Richland Christian Church) and cemetery on the northeast corner, and Howard CR 306 dividing the two. From there, it has a brief concurrency with Route E which is shared by a bridge over Blue Creek. Later it climbs a hill to reach the shared intersections with Howard CR 220 and CR 218, then descends as it approaches the western terminus of Route AA, just before crossing a bridge over Hurricane Creek. The highway starts to curve to the northwest and is joined by another concurrency with Route 5, this time also shared by Route 240. Route 5/Route 87/Route 240 officially enters Glasgow, just before crossing a bridge over Greggs Creek, then crosses a railroad line before heading west, running parallel to another railroad line, owned by Kansas City Southern Railway. Route 87 ends at the northern end of the concurrency with Route 5 and Route 240, the former of which joins Route 240 Bus., while Route 240 continues west to cross another bridge over the Missouri River.

== Major intersections ==
County	Location	mi	km	Destinations	Notes
Miller	Eldon	0.000	0.000	US 54 / Route M – Jefferson City, Lake of the Ozarks	Southern terminus; interchange
Miller	Eldon	1.289	2.074	US 54 Bus. south (South Orange Street)	south end of US 54 Bus. overlap
Miller	Eldon	1.897	3.053	US 54 Bus. north – Eldon	north end of US 54 Bus. overlap
Moniteau	Walker Township	20.881	33.605	US 50 – Jefferson City, Sedalia	interchange
Moniteau	California	22.027	35.449	US 50 Bus. (Buchanan Street) – California	
Moniteau	Jamestown	34.299	55.199	Route 179 south (West Row Street) / Route U – Jamestown, Jefferson City	south end of Route 179 overlap
Moniteau	Linn Township	37.563	60.452	Route 179 north – Woolridge	north end of Route 179 overlap
Cooper	Windsor Place	52.534	84.545	I-70 north / I-70 BL	Exit 106 (I-70); south end of BL-70 overlap
Cooper	Boonville Township	54.382	87.519	Route 98 / Lewis and Clark Trail east – Overton	west end of Route 98
Cooper	Boonville	55.999	90.122	Route B / Main Street	
Cooper	Boonville	56.106	90.294	US 40 west / I-70 BL west / Route 5 south / Lewis and Clark Trail west / Santa Fe National Historic Trail west (Ashley Road) – Boonville	south end of US 40/Route 5 overlap; north end of BL-70 overlap
Missouri River		56.840	91.475	Boonslick Bridge	
Howard	Franklin	57.458	92.470	US 40 east / Route 5 north / Lewis and Clark Trail east – New Franklin	north end of US 40/Route 5 overlap
Howard	Franklin Township			Route Z / Lewis and Clark Trail west / Santa Fe National Historic Trail east – Petersburg	
Howard	Boonslick Township	67.687	108.932	Route 187	Access to Boone's Lick State Historic Site
Howard	Glasgow	76.951	123.841	Route 5 south / Route 240 east – Fayette	south end of Route 5/240 overlap
Howard	Glasgow	77.467	124.671	Route 5 / Route 240 / Route 240 Bus. – Slater	northern terminus; north end of Route 5 overlap; western terminus of Route 240 BUS
1.000 mi = 1.609 km; 1.000 km = 0.621 mi: Concurrency terminus
