= Blackwater Township, Cooper County, Missouri =

Township in the U.S. state of Missouri

Blackwater Township
- Township
- Location in Cooper County
- Coordinates: 38°58′05″N 92°59′39″W
- Country: United States
- State: Missouri
- County: Cooper

Area
  - Total: 25.26 sq mi (65.42 km^{2})
  - Land: 24.88 sq mi (64.45 km^{2})
  - Water: 0.37 sq mi (0.97 km^{2}) 1.48%
- Elevation: 636 ft (194 m)

Population (2000)
  - Total: 406
  - Density: 16/sq mi (6.3/km^{2})
- Time zone: UTC-6 (CST)
  - Summer (DST): UTC-5 (CDT)
- ZIP codes: 65322, 65347
- GNIS feature ID: 0766526

Blackwater Township is one of fourteen townships in Cooper County, Missouri, USA. As of the 2000 census, its population was 406.

The township takes its name from Blackwater River.

== Geography ==
According to the United States Census Bureau, Blackwater Township covers an area of 25.26 square miles (65.42 square kilometers); of this, 24.88 square miles (64.45 square kilometers, 98.52 percent) is land and 0.37 square miles (0.97 square kilometers, 1.48 percent) is water.

=== Cities, towns, villages ===
- Blackwater

=== Unincorporated towns ===
- Shackleford Crossing at 38.8919643°N 93.0335307°W

(This list is based on USGS data and may include former settlements.)

=== Adjacent townships ===
- Arrow Rock Township, Saline County (north)
- Lamine Township (northeast)
- Pilot Grove Township (southeast)
- Clear Creek Township (south)
- Heath Creek Township, Pettis County (southwest)

=== Major highways ===
- Interstate 70
- U.S. Route 40

=== Lakes ===
- Embry Lake
- Horseshoe Lake
- Wilson Lake

== School districts ==
- Pilot Grove C-4

== Political districts ==
- Missouri's 6th congressional district
- State House District 117
- State Senate District 21
