= Saline Township, Cooper County, Missouri =

Township in the U.S. state of Missouri

Saline Township
- Township
- Location in Cooper County
- Coordinates: 38°54′22″N 92°34′22″W
- Country: United States
- State: Missouri
- County: Cooper

Area
  - Total: 47.94 sq mi (124.16 km^{2})
  - Land: 46.71 sq mi (120.98 km^{2})
  - Water: 1.23 sq mi (3.18 km^{2}) 2.56%
- Elevation: 581 ft (177 m)

Population (2010)https://factfinder.census.gov/faces/tableservices/jsf/pages/productview.xhtml?src=bkmk
  - Total: 840
  - Density: 18/sq mi (7/km^{2})
- Time zone: UTC-6 (CST)
  - Summer (DST): UTC-5 (CDT)
- ZIP codes: 65068, 65233, 65287
- GNIS feature ID: 0766538

Saline Township is one of fourteen townships in Cooper County, Missouri, USA. As of the 2000 census, its population was 687.

Saline Township most likely takes its name from Petite Saline Creek.

== Geography ==
According to the United States Census Bureau, Saline Township covers an area of 47.94 square miles (124.16 square kilometers); of this, 46.71 square miles (120.98 square kilometers, 97.44 percent) is land and 1.23 square miles (3.18 square kilometers, 2.56 percent) is water.

=== Cities, towns, villages ===
- Wooldridge

=== Unincorporated towns ===
- Overton at 38.947811°N 92.576296°W
- Pleasant Grove at 38.868643°N 92.551854°W

(This list is based on USGS data and may include former settlements.)

=== Adjacent townships ===
- Moniteau Township, Howard County (north)
- Katy Township, Boone County (northeast)
- Linn Township, Moniteau County (southeast)
- Prairie Home Township (south)
- Clark Fork Township (southwest)
- Boonville Township (west)

=== Major highways ===
- Interstate 70
- Missouri Route 87

== School districts ==
- Boonville School District
- Prairie Home R-V School District

== Political districts ==
- Missouri's 6th congressional district
- State House District 117
- State Senate District 21
