= Petite Saline Creek =

Stream in Moniteau and Morgan counties, Missouri, US

Petite Saline Creek is a stream in Cooper, Moniteau and Morgan counties in the U.S. state of Missouri. It is a tributary of the Missouri River.

The stream source area is along the Morgan-Moniteau county line just north of U.S. Route 50 two miles east of Syracuse and three miles west of Tipton at 38°40′12″N 92°50′18″W and at an elevation of about 920 feet. The stream flows north into Cooper County crossing under and flowing parallel to the west side of Missouri Route 5. The stream turns east again crossing under Route 5 just south of Billingsville. The stream flows generally east passing under Missouri Route 87 southeast of Boonville. The stream continues east to southeast passing under Missouri Route 179 south of Wooldridge. The stream enters the Missouri River bottom just south of Wooldridge in eastern Cooper County and the confluence with the Missouri is in the northern corner of Moniteau County across the river from McBaine at 38°52′35″N 92°28′55″W and an elevation of 564 feet.

At what was then called Wilkin's bridge, there was a skirmish during the American Civil War on October 13, 1864, between the troops of the 5th Regiment, Missouri State Militia Cavalry, and the troops of General Fagan, who were guarding the bridge, during Price's Raid.

Petite Saline Creek was so named for the salty character of the little creek.

Lewis & Clark passed by on June 6, 1804, and made mention of this creek in their journals. ‘Passed the mouth of a creek called ‘saline’ or ‘salt’ creek. This river is about 30 yards wide and has so many licks and salt springs on its banks that the water of the creek is brackish. One very large lick is 9 ms up on the left side. The water of this spring is strong. So much so, that it is said one bushel will make 7 pounds of good salt.”

== See also ==
- List of rivers of Missouri
