= Clear Creek Township, Cooper County, Missouri =

Township in the U.S. state of Missouri

Clear Creek Township
- Township
- Location in Cooper County
- Coordinates: 38°51′57″N 92°59′15″W
- Country: United States
- State: Missouri
- County: Cooper

Area
  - Total: 50.44 sq mi (130.64 km^{2})
  - Land: 50.32 sq mi (130.34 km^{2})
  - Water: 0.12 sq mi (0.3 km^{2}) 0.23%
- Elevation: 830 ft (253 m)

Population (2000)
  - Total: 439
  - Density: 8.8/sq mi (3.4/km^{2})
- Time zone: UTC-6 (CST)
  - Summer (DST): UTC-5 (CDT)
- ZIP codes: 65276, 65348
- GNIS feature ID: 0766529

Clear Creek Township is one of fourteen townships in Cooper County, Missouri, USA. As of the 2000 census, its population was 439.

Clear Creek Township was named after the creek of the same name within its borders.

== Geography ==
According to the United States Census Bureau, Clear Creek Township covers an area of 50.44 square miles (130.64 square kilometers); of this, 50.32 square miles (130.34 square kilometers, 99.77 percent) is land and 0.12 square miles (0.3 square kilometers, 0.23 percent) is water.

=== Unincorporated towns ===
- Harriston at 38.834465°N 92.948251°W
- Hoffman at 38.843632°N 92.945195°W
- Pleasant Green at 38.806131°N 92.962696°W

(This list is based on USGS data and may include former settlements.)

=== Extinct towns ===
- Corioli at 38.904187°N 92.989084°W

(These towns are listed as "historical" by the USGS.)

=== Adjacent townships ===
- Blackwater Township (north)
- Pilot Grove Township (northeast)
- Palestine Township (east)
- Lebanon Township (southeast)
- Otterville Township (south)
- Bowling Green Township, Pettis County (southwest)
- Heath Creek Township, Pettis County (west)

=== Cemeteries ===
The township contains these two cemeteries: Lamine and Sowers.

=== Major highways ===
- Interstate 70
- U.S. Route 40
- Route 135

=== Lakes ===
- Goose Lake

== School districts ==
- Otterville R-Vi
- Pilot Grove C-4
- Smithton School District

== Political districts ==
- Missouri's 6th congressional district
- State House District 117
- State Senate District 21

== Notable people ==
- Clark Griffith, baseball pitcher, manager, and team owner.
