= Missouri Route 98 =

State highway in Missouri, U.S.

Route 98
- Route 98 highlighted in red

Route information
- Maintained by MoDOT
- Length: 8.376 mi (13.480 km)
- Existed: 1922–present

Major junctions
- West end: Route 87 in Boonville
- East end: Overton

Location
- Country: United States
- State: Missouri

Highway system
- Missouri State Highway System; Interstate; US; State; Supplemental
← Route 97	→ Route 99

Route 98 is a highway in Cooper County. It stretches for 9.5 miles through a mostly rural area of Missouri.

== Route description ==
In the west, Route 98 begins at Business Loop Interstate 70/Route 87 in Booneville. It proceeds eastward, traversing a largely rural area. Upon reaching Orchard Drive, Route 98 turns due south, but soon resumes an eastward course as it passes near the Jesse Viertel Memorial Airport. The highway approaches I-70, which it generally parallels for its entire length. Route 98 reaches its closest proximity to I-70 when it meets a junction with Route 179. It turns northeast and loses its designation at a railroad crossing and transitions into Cumberland Church Road, south of the Missouri River.

== Major intersections ==
The entire route is in Cooper County.

Location	mi	km	Destinations	Notes
Boonville	0.000	0.000	Route 87 / Lewis and Clark Trail – Boonville, Prairie Home	Western terminus; west end of Lewis and Clark Trail overlap
Saline Township	6.923	11.141	Route 179 south / Lewis and Clark Trail – Wooldridge	East end of Lewis and Clark Trail overlap
Overton	8.376	13.480	End state maintenance	
1.000 mi = 1.609 km; 1.000 km = 0.621 mi: Concurrency terminus
