= Glasgow Bridge =

Glasgow Bridge may refer to:

- Glasgow Bridge, Glasgow over the Clyde sometimes known as Jamaica Bridge.
- Glasgow Bridge, Kirkintilloch, the site of the Roman Fortlet and bridge over the Forth and Clyde Canal.
- Glasgow Bridge, Missouri over the Missouri River adjacent to a rail bridge.
