= Chouteau Springs, Missouri =

Unincorporated community in Missouri, US

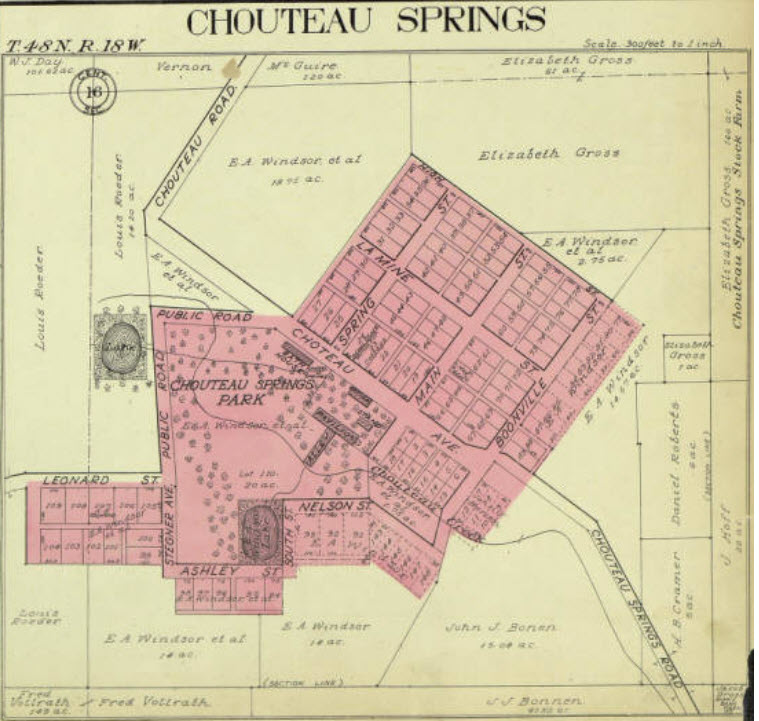
1915 map of Chouteau Springs, Missouri from the Standard Atlas of Cooper County, Missouri, 1915, p.13, State Historical Society of Missouri

Chouteau Springs is an unincorporated community in Pilot Grove Township, Cooper County, in the U.S. state of Missouri.

== Chronological History ==
In 1799 Jean Pierre Chouteau and his party of fur traders on an inland excursion from the Missouri River came upon bubbling mineral springs in a valley surrounded by sycamores and elms. The local Osage Indians informed Chouteau of the curative qualities of the mineral water and told him that their braves would often drink from them. Chouteau bartered with the Osage for 30,000 arpens (about 25,000 acres) of what is now called the Chouteau Springs area. The official transaction took place at the Fort of the Osages on March 19, 1799. Chouteau would later sell the 30,000 arpens to William Henry Ashley, Missouri's first Lieutenant Governor (1820–1824)

Pierre Chouteau, acquired Chouteau Springs area from the Osage. Image from the Missouri Historical Society Collections, 1911, v3, p. 391

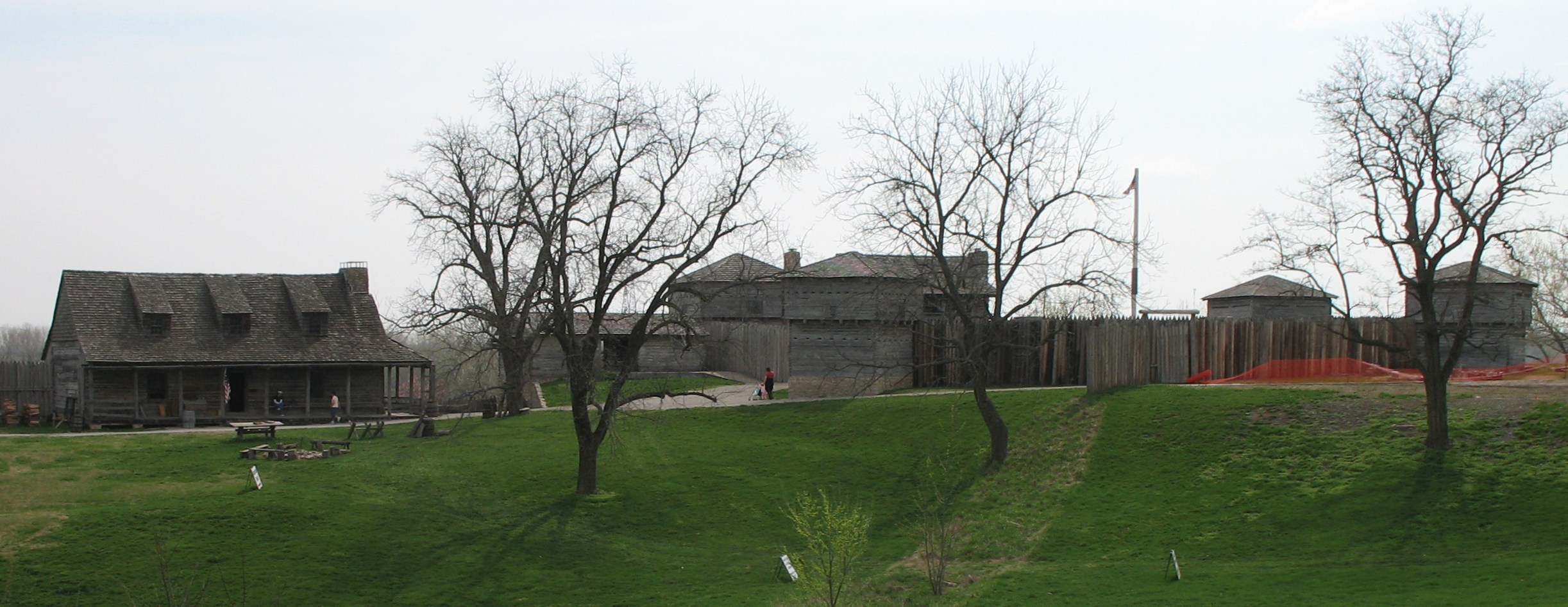
Fort of the Osages where Pierre Chouteau acquired the Chouteau Springs area from the Osage Indians in 1799. {Public Domain photo.}

As early as 1855, the "medicinal qualities" of the water from Chouteau Springs was being touted in newspaper advertisements. R. A Campbell in 1874 wrote regarding the medicinal qualities of Chouteau Springs, "Among the latter the most noted for their medicinal properties are the Chouteau Springs, about 12 miles south-west of Boonville, and near the line of the Missouri, Kansas & Texas Railroad. They are much frequented, and when improved will be a delightful place for summer resort. The medicinal properties of these waters are highly spoken of, and numerous individuals have received great benefit from their use."

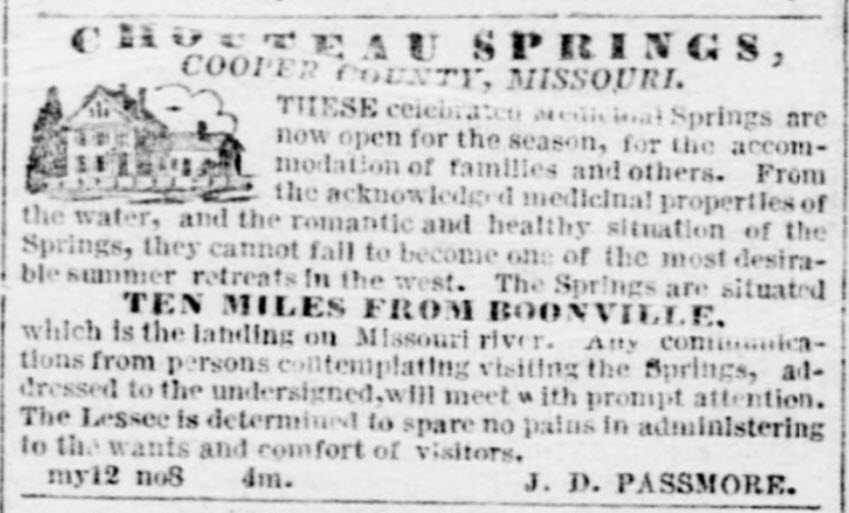
1855 Advertisement touting the medicinal benefits of Chouteau Springs water {from the Boonville Weekly Observer, July 7, p. 1}

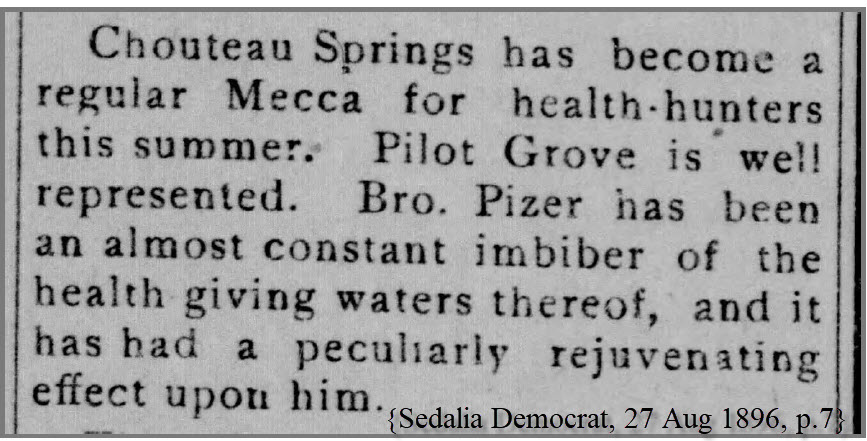
Source: Sedalia (Missouri) Democrat, 27 Aug 1896, p. 7

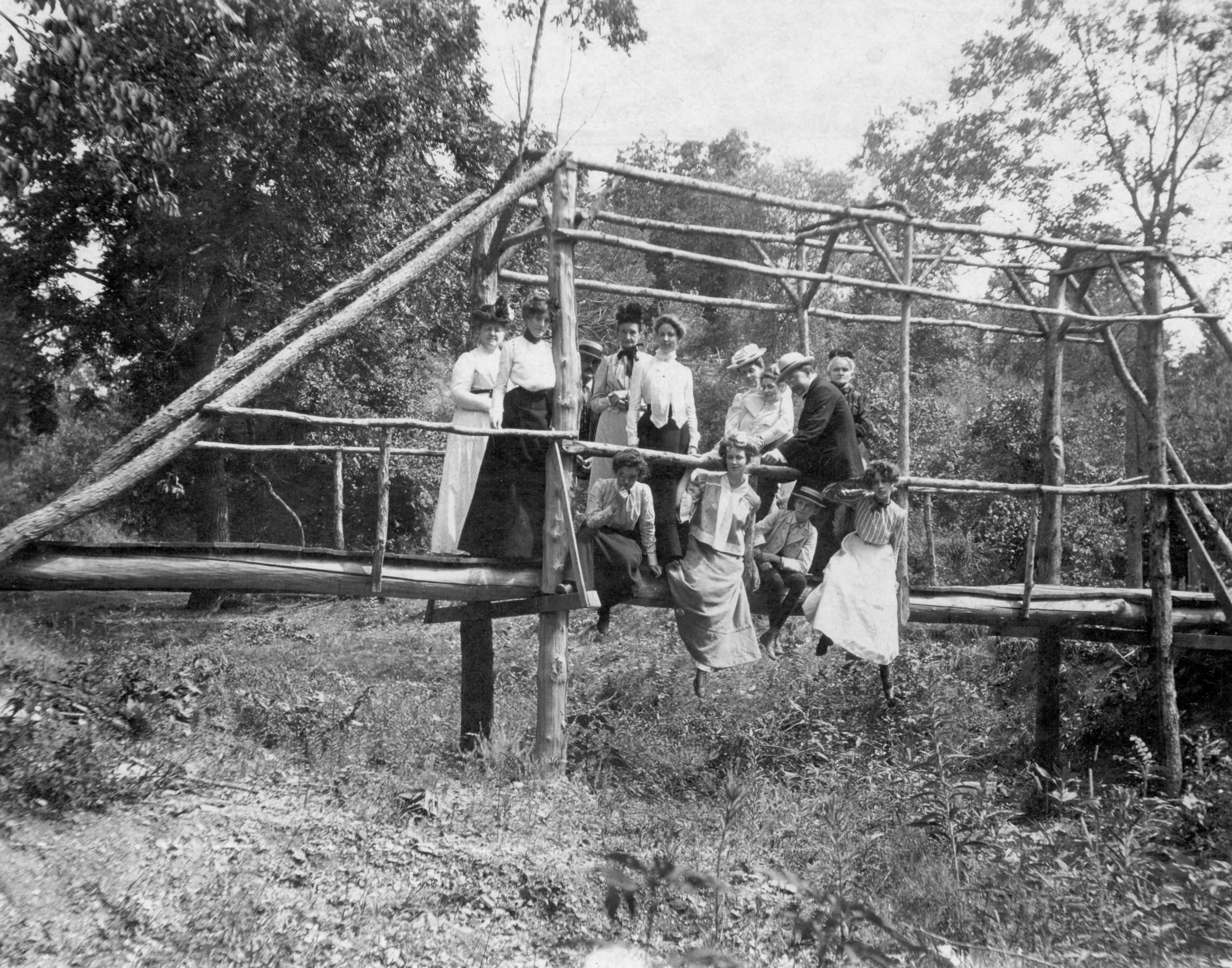
Wooden Log Bridge at Chouteau Springs circa 1900 {From the Charles van Ravenswaay Photograph Collection, State Historical Society of Missouri}

On October 12, 1864, 10p.m., Major General Sterling Price marched his Confederate troops from Boonville to Chouteau Springs, a distance of about 11 miles, where they camped briefly on their way to eventually being routed in Westport (Kansas City) by the Union forces and driven into Kansas. Local resident Maria Eva (Martin) Day recalled that when she was about 16 years old and the Confederate soldiers of Generals Price and Shelby were camped out in Chouteau Springs: "One time I remember well the bushwackers and guerillas took everything we had, even the sauerkraut, and carried it away in their handkerchiefs and in paper. At those times, young girls would not dare to walk anywhere by themselves, and we used to ride horseback, and when we passed the camps we would ride as hard as we could and sing 'Way Down In Dixie.' The bushwackers and guerillas killed and took away much of the farmers' food, livestock, and poultry."

In 1870, St. Martin's Catholic Church, an 18x24 log structure, was built in Chouteau Springs on 1.5 acres of land donated by Daniel Martin, called "Martinsville." A larger frame structure church was built on the same grounds in 1877 and in 1908 a solid red brick church was built on 2.25 acres donated by Anton Joseph Wesselman. The third church was about 1/4 mile north of the Chouteau Springs KATY railroad station. In 1920 St. Martin's Parochial School was built next to the brick church. One hundred years after the first church was built in 1870, the Diocese closed down St. Martin's Church and School in 1970. St. Martin's Cemetery (Chouteau Springs "Martinsville") is located on the eastern rim of Chouteau Springs 38.9169006°N 92.8778000°W. Cemetery records are regularly surveyed.

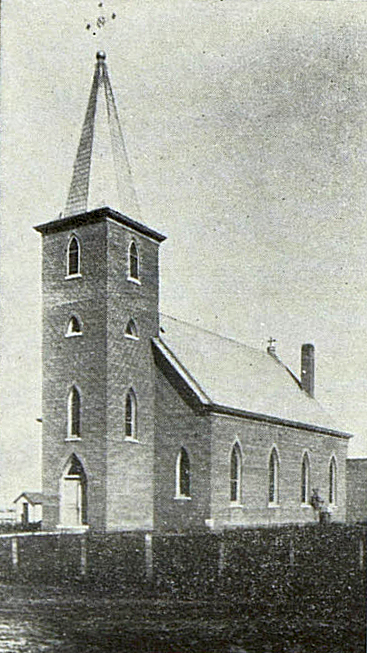
St. Martin's Catholic Church, Chouteau Springs, Cooper County, Missouri, circa 1910, built in 1908 {from the Standard Atlas of Cooper County, 1915, p. 79, State Historical Society of Missouri}

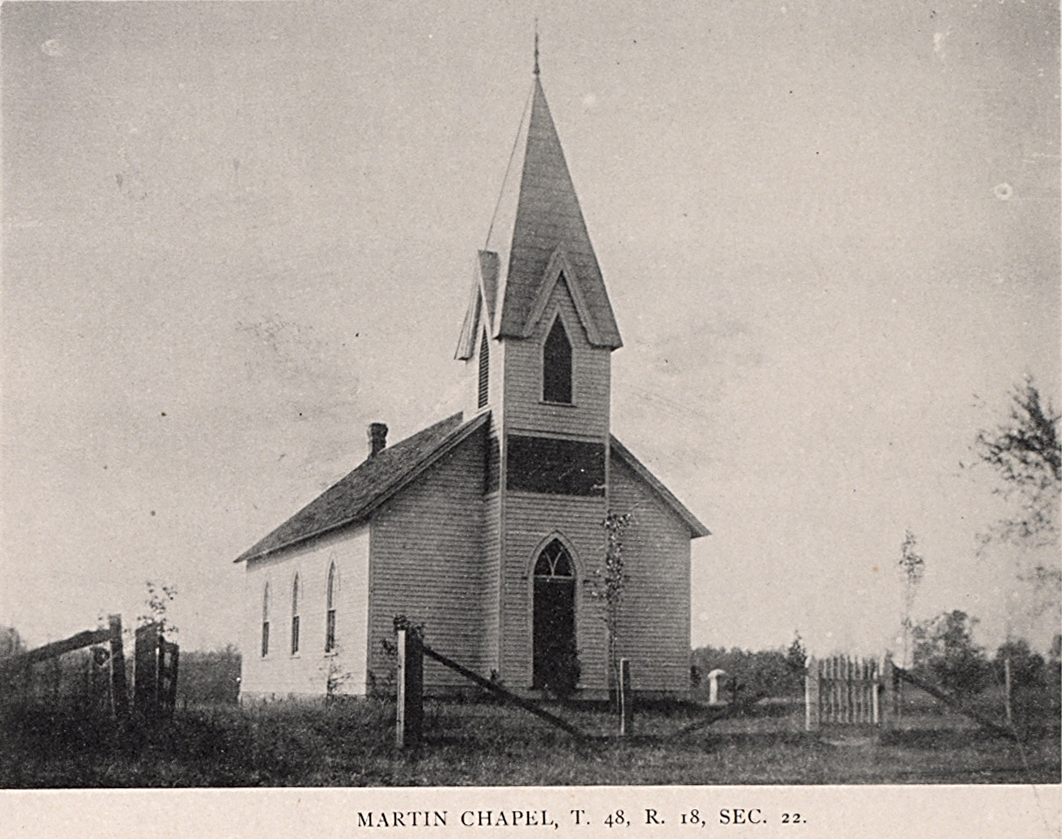
St. Martin's Chapel, Wood-Framed Structure, Chouteau Springs, Missouri, built in 1877 on land donated by Daniel Martin {from p. 17 of the 1897 Illustrated Historical Atlas of Cooper County, Missouri, State Historical Society of Missouri.}

In 1877, a 4-story frame hotel 190 x 45 ft. was built in Chouteau Springs for about $25,000 with C. B. Lakin of Kansas City as the architect. It had a passenger elevator, steam bath, speaking tubes, hardwood, stained glass. In 1906, there was a hotel in Chouteau Springs called the "Hotel Brown".

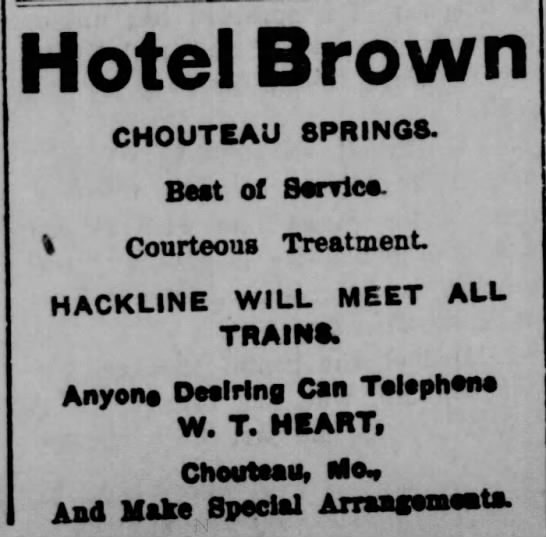
1906 Advertisement for Hotel Brown, Chouteau Springs, Missouri; appeared in Sedalia Democrat, Aug 6, p. 3

Arguably the most beloved hotel operator in Chouteau Springs was Maria Eva (Martin) Day, affectionately known as "Grandma" Day. After her husband John Adam Day died in 1911, she solely operated Day Hotel for 18 years, charging $4.50 per week for lodging and 25 cents per meal. Her renowned specialty was fried chicken because as she said, "Yes, that's what people like best." Grandma Day died in 1937 at 89 years of age.

In 1882, citizens of Boonville seriously considered piping Chouteau Springs mineral water from Chouteau Springs to Boonville, a distance of about ten miles. By the late 1880s, Chouteau Springs Resort had several turreted structures (gazebos) from which to obtain the mineral water, a large dancing pavilion, a pool, and ample picnic grounds. Families from St. Louis and beyond would spend a week or more at Chouteau Springs Resort.

Fox hunts were also conducted at Chouteau Springs Resort.

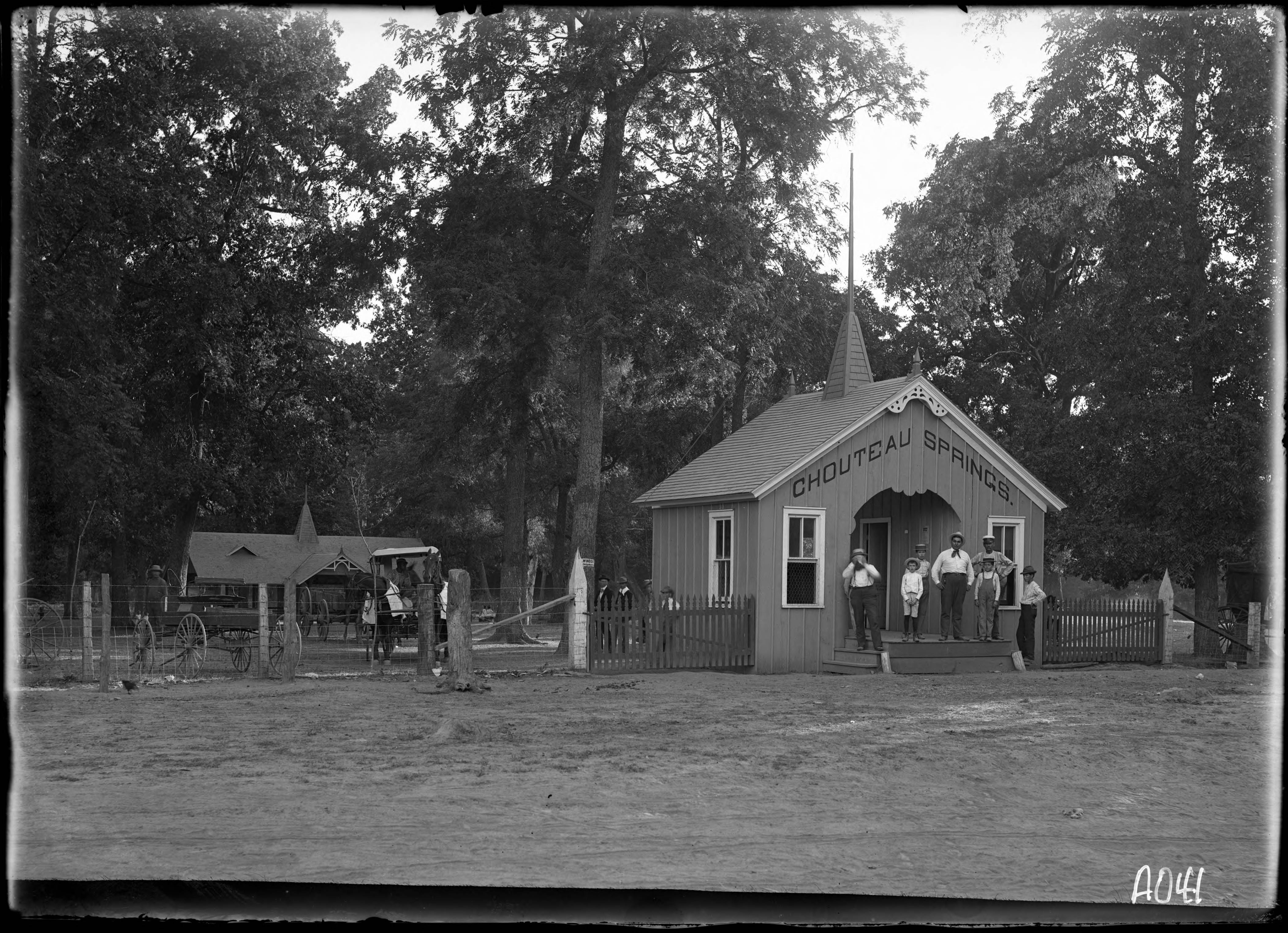
Chouteau Springs Resort Entrance & Pavilion early 1900s. From Schmidt, Maximilan E, Photographs (P0001)P0001-A041. The State Historical Society of Missouri, Photograph Collection

Chouteau Springs was officially platted in 1886 beside a mineral spring, and named after Jean Pierre Chouteau, the original owner of the town site.

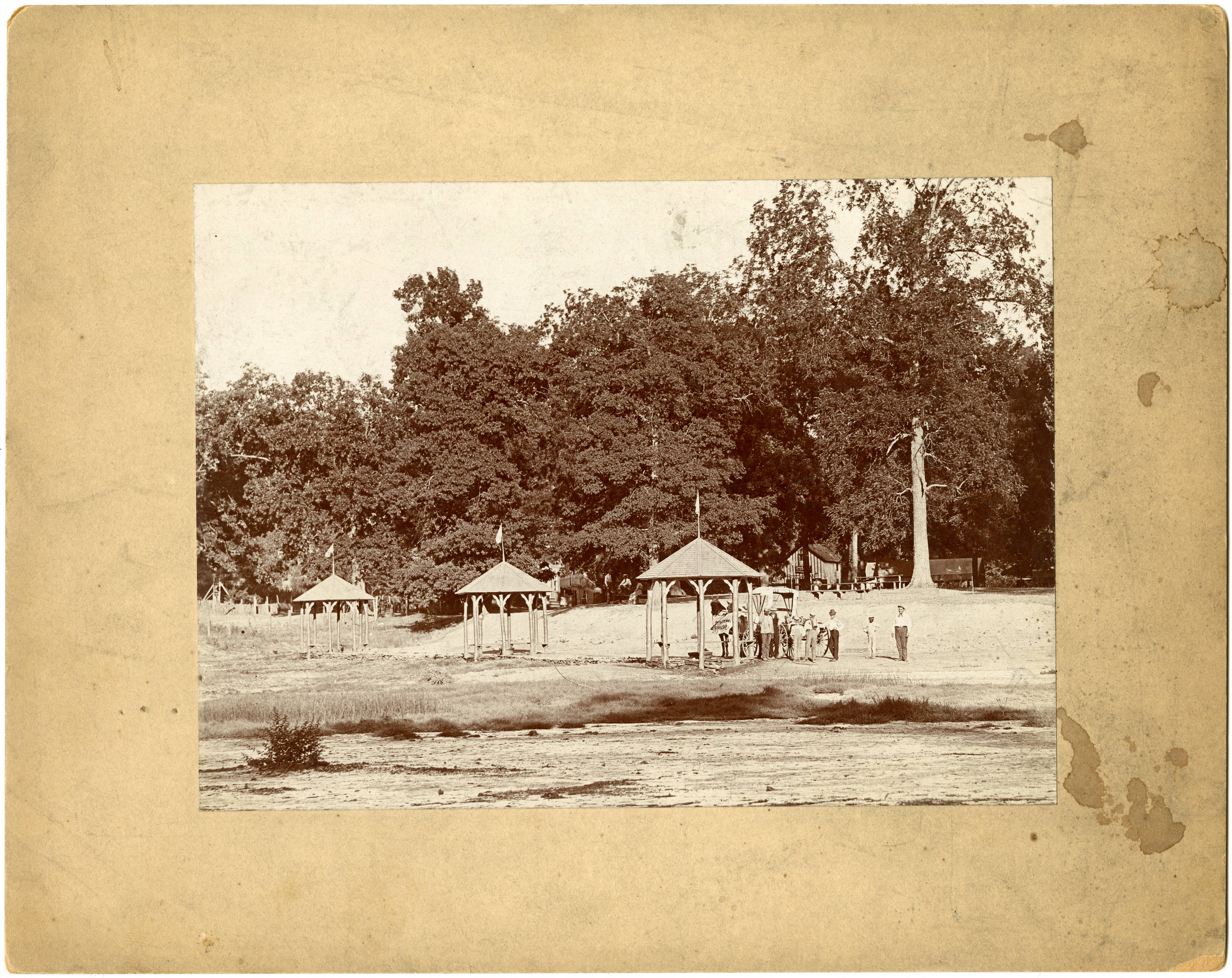
Gazebos over Chouteau Springs wells {Photo by Maximilian E. Schmidt, The State Historical Society of Missouri}

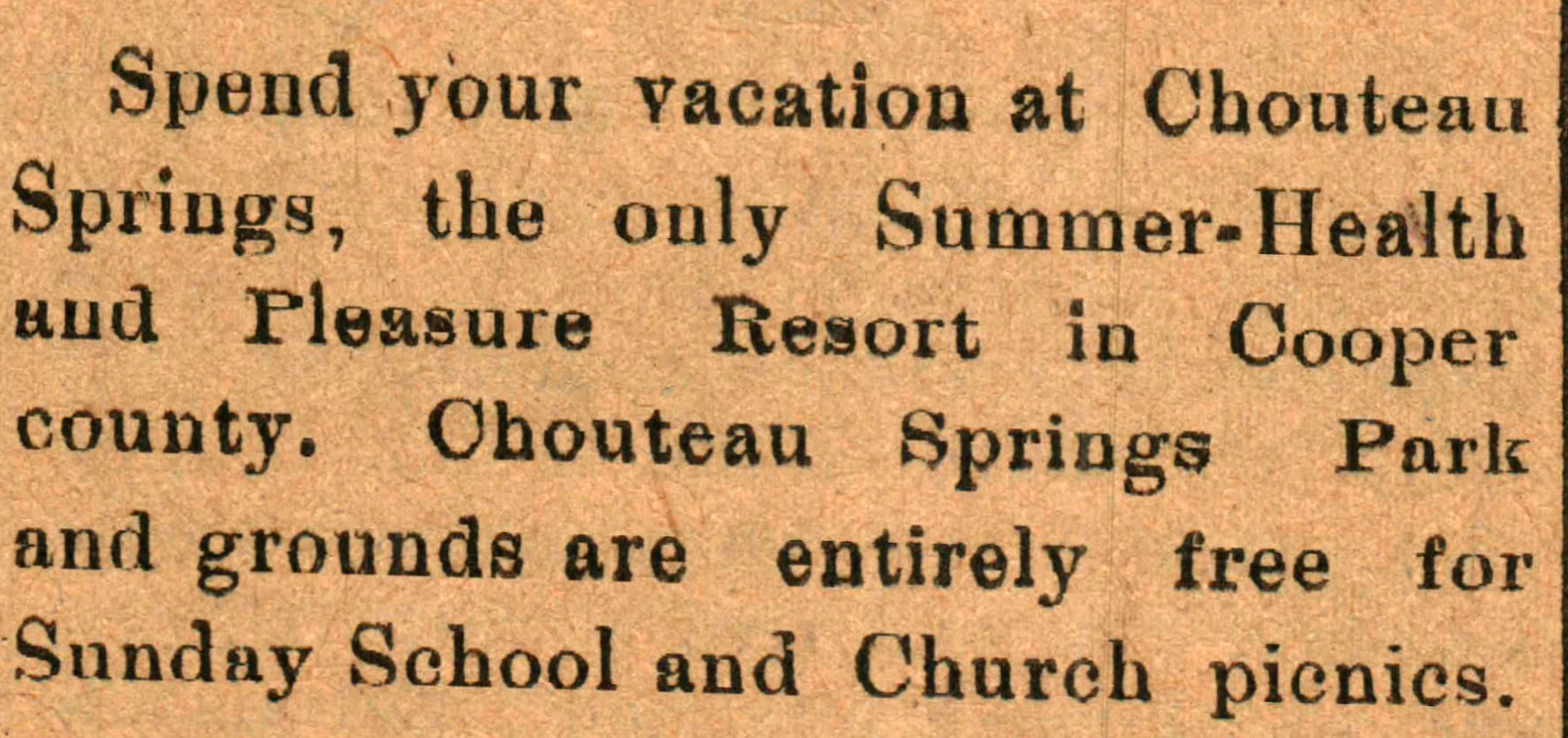
1904 Bunceton Eagle Tribune Newspaper Advertisement for Chouteau Springs Park, Missouri

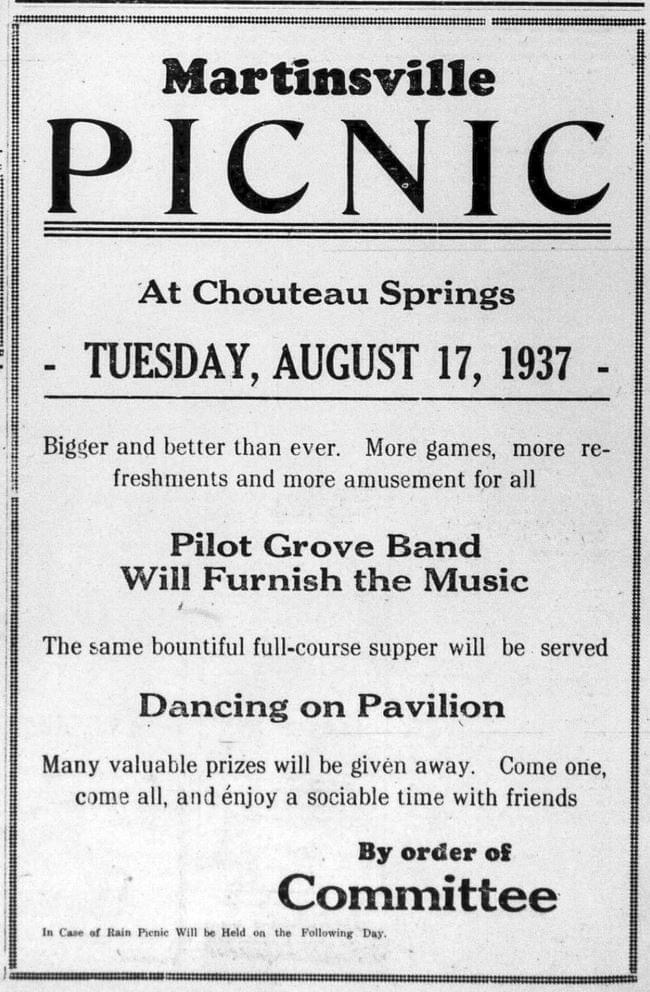
1937 St. Martin's "Martinsville" Catholic Church Annual Picnic in Chouteau Springs, Cooper County, Missouri {Bunceton Eagle, August 1937}

In 1887, an electric railroad] from Boonville to Chouteau Springs was proposed. It was never built.

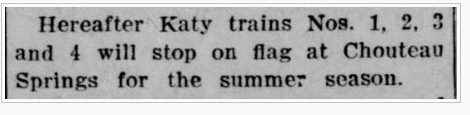
1907 Katy Train Stops in Chouteau Springs, Missouri {The Sedalia Democrat, July 24, 1907, p. 8}

In 1889, Nick, John and Leonard Smith sunk a shaft south of Chouteau Springs, seeking gold.

The U.S. Post Office "Chouteau" was established in 1890 and remained in operation until 1896. The following were appointed as U.S. Postmasters of the Chouteau post office: Homer Edson (appointed 18 June 1890), George Gross (23 January 1891), Benj Bowles (11 September 1891), Hiram Shrout (9 July 1892), Mary Shrout (16 June 1893). Chouteau post office responsibilities reverted to Lamine on 4 January 1896.

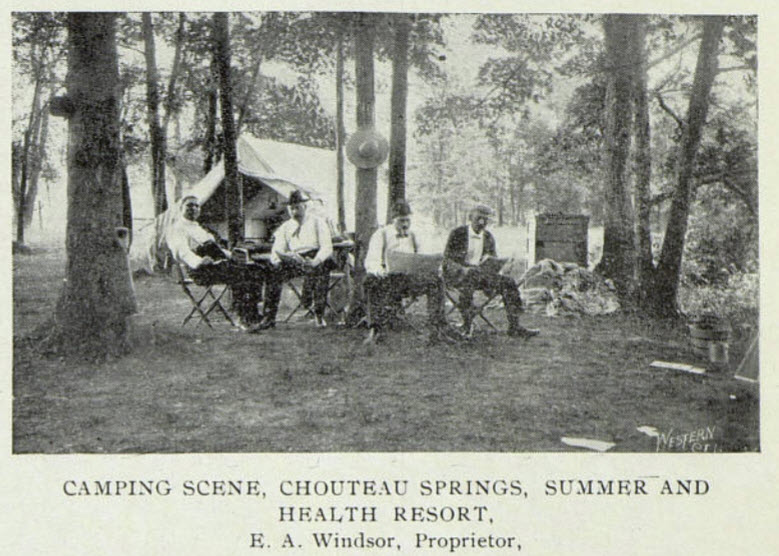
1915 Camping at Chouteau Springs Resort, Cooper County, Missouri. From p. 83 of the Standard Atlas of Cooper County, Missouri, 1915, State Historical Society of Missouri

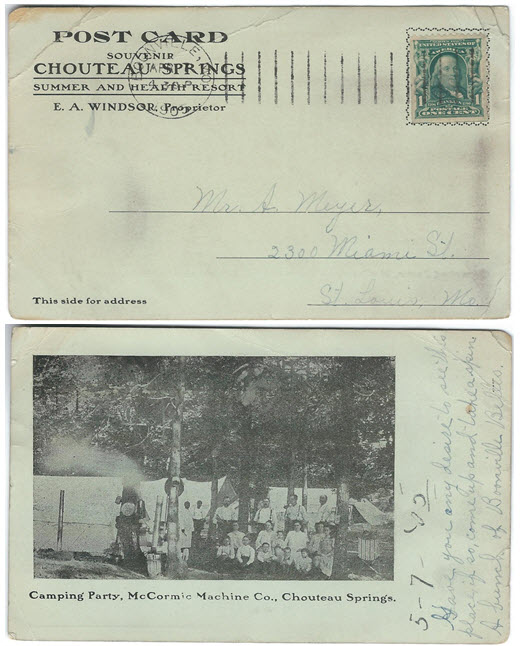
1905 Chouteau Springs, Missouri Real Photo Post Card Showing Camping Party At The Resort

In 1900, Eugene A Windsor purchased Chouteau Springs Park Resort from James E. Young of Kansas City, Kansas. Everett Spry was manager of Chouteau Springs Resort from about 1917 to 1932.

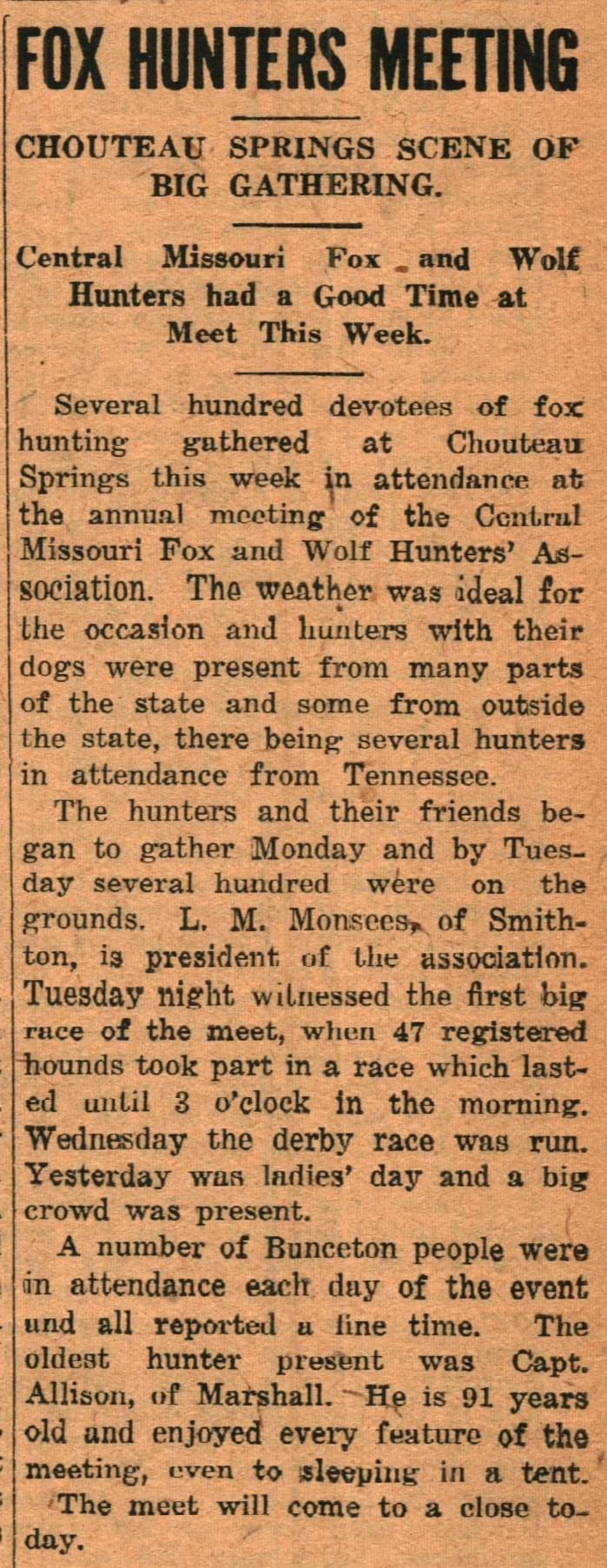
Chouteau Springs, Cooper County, Missouri was a frequent host of fox hunts in Missouri in the early 1900s {Bunceton (Missouri) Eagle, circa 1920}

By 1907, KATY Railroad was making multiple stops in Chouteau Springs.

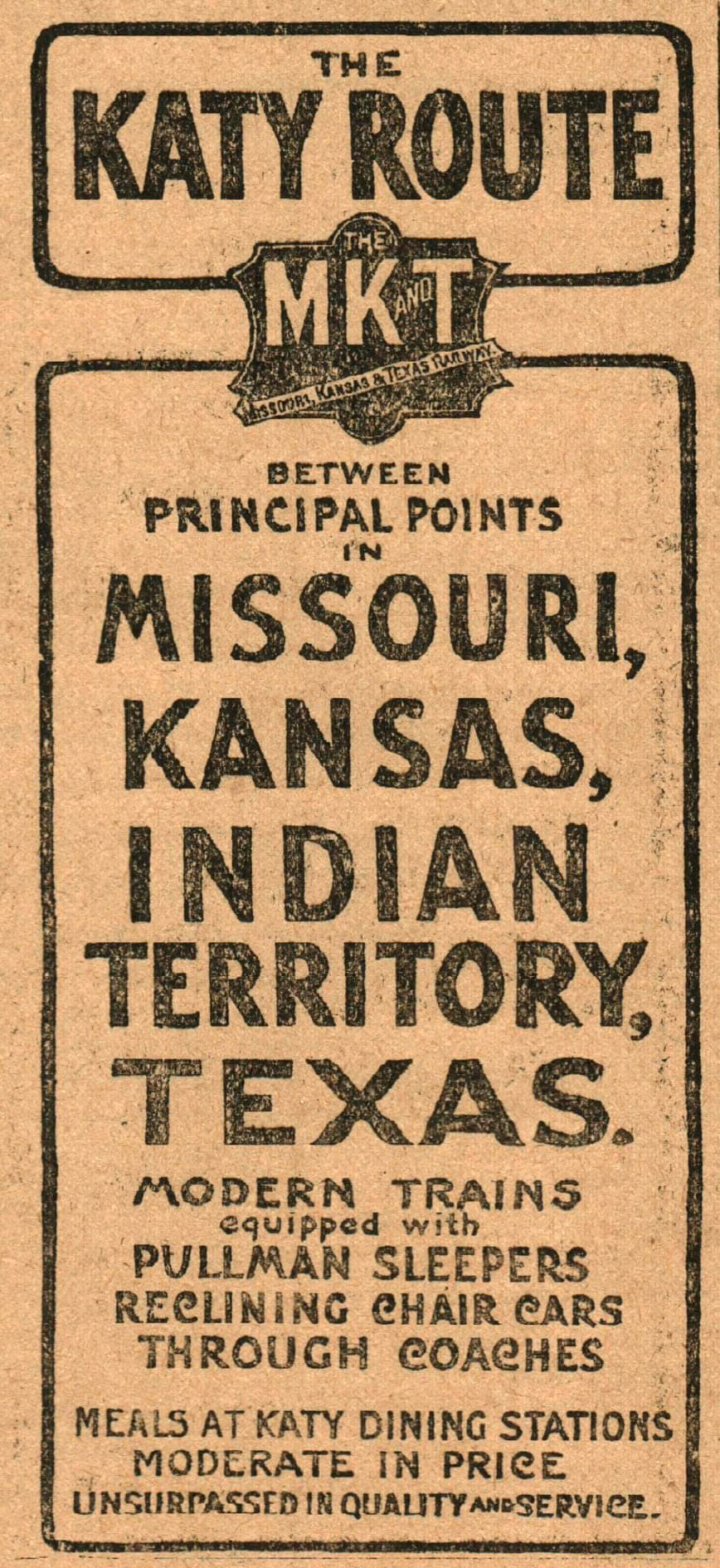
1902 Advertisement for MKT RR (KATY) published in Cooper County, Missouri newspapers

Melton (1937, p. 159) noted the following about the Chouteau Springs Grade School: "DISTRICT 18, CHOUTEAU, is taught by Miss Florence Stoecklein. Members of the board are: President, John S. Davis; Herman Lammers and John Schuster. Henry Brownfield is clerk. Pupils are: Dorothy Davis, Lorena Gatewood, John Edward Schuster, Farrel Gatewood, Jr., Margie Edson, Edna Grace Davis, Ruby Smith, Goldie Nelson, Kenneth Nelson, Bennie Evans, Albert Gatewood, Orville Evans, Mary Schraeder, Albert Leo Imhoff, Alberta Schraeder, Thomas Gatewood, Homer Evans, Alvin Oland and Robert Imhoff."

Chouteau Springs Park Resort ceased operations about 1960 with Jack Schweitzer as its last manager. In a 1982 piece in the Kansas City Times, James J. Fisher called Chouteau Springs "The Town That Could Have Been" and attributed its demise to the building of Bagnell Dam, which created the Lake of the Ozarks, and to the Great Depression. Chouteau Springs Resort is in ruins as of 2019.

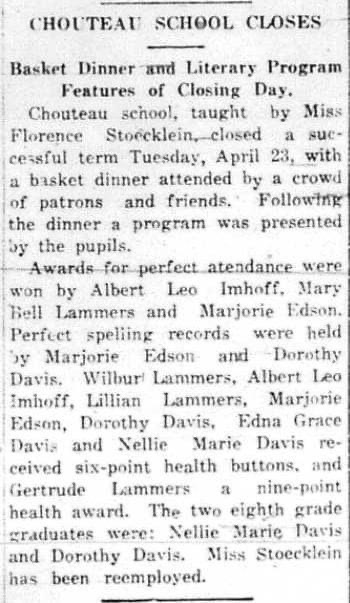
1935 Chouteau Springs School Term Closing and Awards, Cooper County, Missouri. From the "Pilot Grove Record," April, 1935; Cooper County Historical Society, Pilot Grove, Missouri.

The surrounding farmlands and homes of the Chouteau Springs community continue to thrive.

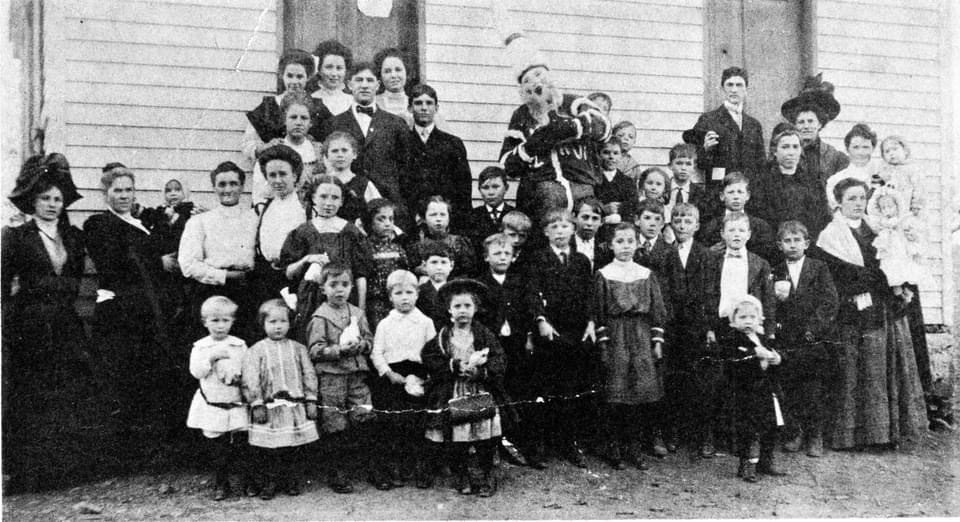
1907 Chouteau Springs School, Cooper County, Missouri, USA {Cooper County Historical Society, Pilot Grove, Missouri}

== Geological Research ==
In 1874, Professor Adolphe Smith of the Missouri Geological Survey was "delighted with Chouteau Springs water, pronouncing it the best he ever tasted and better than the famous Blue Lick waters in Kentucky." In 1886, an analysis of Chouteau Springs water by G. C. Swallow, Missouri state geologist, showed the following minerals: carbonate of protoxide of iron, carbonate of lime, carbonate of magnesia, chloride of calcium, chloride of potassium, chloride of sodium, carbonic acid and silica. Total weight of the minerals was approximately one-tenth of one per cent of the weight of the water.

In 1902, Professor F. A. Sampson of the State Historical Society of Missouri and Professor Stewart Weller of Chicago University studied the subcarboniferous era geologic formations of Chouteau Springs.

In 1981, Larry Stout, a scientist at the Scripps Institution of Oceanography in La Jolla, California, published an article in the Journal of Paleontology regarding his discovery of the unusual occurrence (only the third known in North America) of the brackish-water ostracode Cyprideis salebrosa in Chouteau Springs.

In 1944, William H. Easton of the Illinois State Geological Survey Division published an article which noted, among many other things, that the coral fauna of the Chouteau Springs limestone is larger in number of genera and species than that known from any other Carboniferous formation in this hemisphere (p. 7).

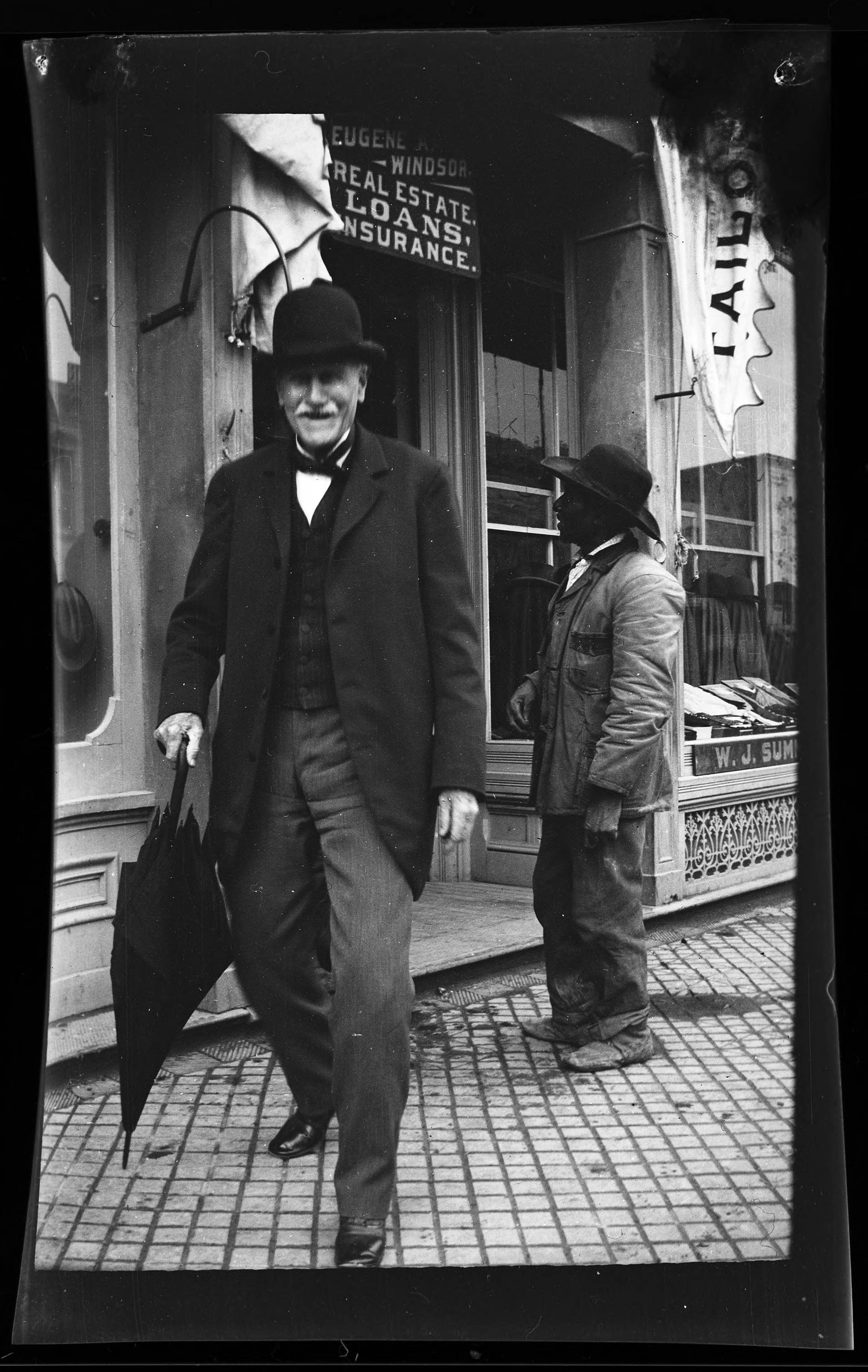
Eugene A Windsor, owner of Chouteau Springs Resort in 1900, (with umbrella) outside his office Windsor Loans and Insurance, Boonville, Cooper County, Missouri ca 1905 {Photo by Maximilian E. Schmidt, State Historical Society of Missouri, P0001-P086}

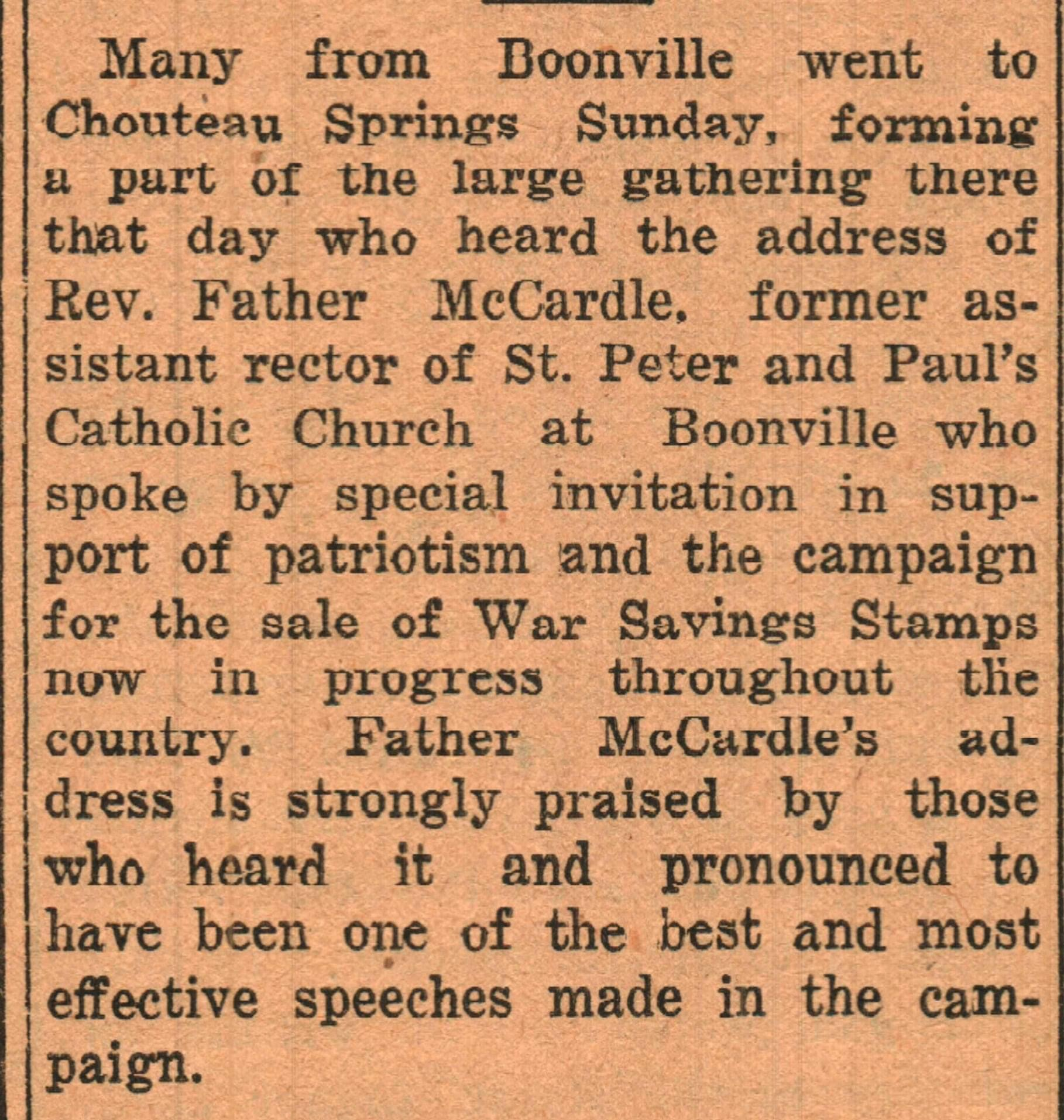
Circa 1917 clipping from the Bunceton (Missouri) Eagle/Tribune describing Boonville's Fr. McCardle's patriotism speech given at Chouteau Springs.
