= Missouri Route 240 =

State highway in Missouri, U.S.

Route 240
- MO 240 highlighted in red

Route information
- Maintained by MoDOT
- Length: 51.828 mi (83.409 km)

Major junctions
- West end: US 65 / US 65 Bus. in Marshall
- East end: US 40 near Rocheport

Location
- Country: United States
- State: Missouri

Highway system
- Missouri State Highway System; Interstate; US; State; Supplemental
← Route 231	→ Route 242

Route 240 is a highway in the central part of Missouri. Its eastern terminus is at U.S. Route 40 about two miles (3 km) west of Columbia; its western terminus is at U.S. Route 65 in Marshall. Spur Route 240 connects the road with Rocheport.

From 1922 until 1926, Route 240 from Rocheport to Fayette was Route 67. It was renumbered Route 3 in 1926; that route has since been extended north and truncated, leaving Route 240 behind.

The highway was mentioned in the title of David R. Holsinger's four-movement piece "One Day In a Small Town...". The fourth movement is titled "Chasing the Band Bus on MO240".

== Route description ==
Route 240 begins its journey east in Marshall at U.S. Route 65, concurrent with southbound Business Loop 65. Less than ½ mile down the road, Route 240 dumps Business Loop 65 and picks up southbound Route 41. Route 41 leaves a few miles east of Marshall, leaving Route 240 to head on its own. Route 240 heads north-northeast through gently rolling hills to Slater, where Route turns east. The highway then passes through Gilliam, crosses the Missouri River, then enters Glasgow. At the Glasgow end of the bridge, Route 240 becomes concurrent with the southbound directions of Route 5 and Route 87, and at the same time gains a business loop. As the highway exits Glasgow, Routes 5 and 240 turn off of Route 87 and head east-northeast (despite being signed as a southbound direction) until meeting the other end of Business Loop 240, after which the duplex turns east. The duplex later turns south-south east and meets the southern terminus of Route 3. North of Fayette, Route 240 turns off of Route 5, but still heads in the southeasterly direction as it passes through Downtown Fayette. South of the city, Route 240 serves as the western end of Route 124. Route 240 then becomes hillier until it meets U.S. Route 40, where it flattens out and meets Alternate Route 240, which provides easier access from eastbound Route 240 to westbound Route 40, and vice versa (see below).

== Intersections ==
County	Location	mi	km	Destinations	Notes
Saline	Marshall	0.000	0.000	US 65 / US 65 Bus. begins / Lewis and Clark Trail / Santa Fe National Historic Trail	Western end of US 65 Business overlap
Saline	Marshall	0.581	0.935	US 65 Bus. south / Route 41 north	Eastern end of US 65 Business overlap; western end of Route 41 overlap
Saline	Marshall	1.1	1.8	Route O – Marshall	Westbound exit eastbound entrance
Saline	Marshall Township	5.541	8.917	Route 41 / Lewis and Clark Trail / Santa Fe National Historic Trail – Arrow Rock	Eastern end of Route 41 overlap
Missouri River		25.736	41.418	Glasgow Bridge; Saline–Howard county line	
Howard	Glasgow	25.909	41.696	Route 5 / Route 87 / Route 240 Bus. – Slater	Western end of Route 5 / Route 87 overlap; western end of MO 240 Business
Howard	Glasgow	26.425	42.527	Route 87 / Lewis and Clark Trail – Boonville	Eastern end of Route 87 overlap
Howard	Chariton Township	30.594	49.236	Route 240 Bus. west	Eastern end of Route 240 Business
Howard	Prairie Township	33.376	53.713	Route 3 north – Armstrong	
Howard	Fayette	38.376	61.760	Route 5 / Lewis and Clark Trail – New Franklin	Eastern end of Route 5 overlap
Howard	Richmond Township	40.140	64.599	Route 124 east – Harrisburg	
Howard	Moniteau Township	51.225	82.439	Route 240 Alt. west – Boonville	
Howard	Moniteau Township	51.828	83.409	US 40 / Lewis and Clark Trail – Boonville	
1.000 mi = 1.609 km; 1.000 km = 0.621 mi: Concurrency terminus; Incomplete access

== Glasgow business loop ==
Route 240 Business
- Location: Glasgow, Missouri
- Length: 4.858 mi (7.818 km)

Business Loop 240 runs entirely on the old routing of Route 240. It begins at the Glasgow end of the bridge over the Missouri River. It heads north concurrent with Route 5 through Downtown Glasgow. After passing through downtown, Route 5 leaves, and Business 240 runs eastward to the new routing of Routes 5 and 240.

== Howard County alternate ==
Route 240 Alternate
- Location: Northwest of Rocheport, Missouri
- Length: 0.789 mi (1,270 m)

Alternate Route 240 in rural Howard County is technically a spur route that provides easy access from eastbound Route 240 to westbound U.S. Route 40, and vice versa, utilizing an old alignment of U.S. Route 40. The route runs northeast from U.S. Route 40 at the southeastern edge of the Davidsdale Conservation Area, then passes through some farmland. After running along the northwestern edge of a small pond, it intersects Howard County Road 435A, and immediately the shared intersection of Howard County Roads 442 and 435. Before reaching its northeastern terminus, the road curves east, where a connecting road leads to westbound Route 240, while the existing road curves to the southeast and ends at eastbound Route 240.

== Rocheport spur ==
Route 240 Spur
- Location: Rocheport, Missouri
- Length: 1.092 mi (1.757 km)

Route 240 Spur is a spur route from US 40/MO 240 that runs towards Rocheport, Missouri. Though cardinal direction signs read "East," it actually runs south from its parent route, taking the Lewis and Clark Trail with it. The road then curves to the southeast where it has a wye intersection with Howard County Road 440. Spur Route 240 officially enters Rocheport, just before crossing a bridge over Moniteau Creek where it also crosses the Howard-Boone County Line, then ends at Route BB (Third Street), which takes the Lewis and Clark Trail with it, while Spur Route 240 continues south as Central Avenue which leads to a portion of the Katy Trail State Park.
