= Missouri Route 187 =

State highway in Missouri, U.S.

Route 187
- MO 187 highlighted in red

Route information
- Maintained by MoDOT
- Length: 2.218 mi (3.570 km)

Major junctions
- West end: CR-328 at Boone's Lick State Historic Site
- East end: Route 87 north of Boonesboro

Location
- Country: United States
- State: Missouri

Highway system
- Missouri State Highway System; Interstate; US; State; Supplemental
← Route 185	→ Route 190

Route 187 is a short segment of highway running less than five miles (8 km) in Howard County, Missouri. Its eastern terminus is at Route 87 south of Glasgow; its western terminus is at Boone's Lick State Historic Site. No towns are on the route.

== Route description ==
Route 187 begins at Boone's Lick State Historic Site in Howard County, where the road continues west as CR-328. The route heads northeast on a two-lane undivided road, passing through areas of fields and woods. Route 187 curves east and comes to its eastern terminus at Route 87 north of Boonesboro.

== Major intersections ==
The entire route is in Howard County.

Location	mi	km	Destinations	Notes
	0.000	0.000	CR-328 west	
Boonesboro	2.218	3.570	Route 87	
1.000 mi = 1.609 km; 1.000 km = 0.621 mi
