= Pilot Grove Township, Cooper County, Missouri =

Township in the U.S. state of Missouri

Pilot Grove Township
- Township
- Location in Cooper County
- Coordinates: 38°52′56″N 92°54′07″W
- Country: United States
- State: Missouri
- County: Cooper

Area
  - Total: 36.2 sq mi (93.7 km^{2})
  - Land: 35.94 sq mi (93.09 km^{2})
  - Water: 0.24 sq mi (0.61 km^{2}) 0.65%
- Elevation: 814 ft (248 m)

Population (2000)
  - Total: 1,134
  - Density: 32/sq mi (12.2/km^{2})
- Time zone: UTC-6 (CST)
  - Summer (DST): UTC-5 (CDT)
- ZIP codes: 65233, 65276, 65322
- GNIS feature ID: 0766536

Pilot Grove Township is one of fourteen townships in Cooper County, Missouri, USA. As of the 2000 census, its population was 1,134.

== Geography ==
According to the United States Census Bureau, Pilot Grove Township covers an area of 36.18 square miles (93.7 square kilometers); of this, 35.94 square miles (93.09 square kilometers, 99.35 percent) is land and 0.24 square miles (0.61 square kilometers, 0.65 percent) is water.

=== Cities, towns, villages ===
- Pilot Grove

=== Unincorporated towns ===
- Chouteau Springs at 38.925023°N 92.894914°W

(This list is based on USGS data and may include former settlements.)

=== Adjacent townships ===
- Lamine Township (north)
- Boonville Township (east)
- Palestine Township (southeast)
- Clear Creek Township (southwest)
- Blackwater Township (northwest)

=== Cemeteries ===
The township contains these four cemeteries: Mount Vernon, Pleasant Hill, Saint Joseph, and Saint Martin's in Chouteau Springs.

=== Major highways ===
- Interstate 70
- U.S. Route 40
- Route 41
- Route 135

== School districts ==
- Boonville School District
- Pilot Grove C-4

== Political districts ==
- Missouri's 6th congressional district
- State House District 117
- State Senate District 21

== Notable people ==
- America McCutchen Drennan (1830–1903), educator and missionary
