= Kliever, Missouri =

Unincorporated community in the US state of Missouri

Coordinates: 38°41′50″N 92°30′13″W

Kliever (also spelled Kleiver) is an unincorporated community in eastern Moniteau County, in the U.S. state of Missouri. The primary road which passes through Kliever is Missouri Route 87. The community is about five miles northeast of California and five miles south of Jamestown.

== History ==
A post office called Kliever was established in 1891, and remained in operation until 1907. The community was named after one Mr. Kleiver, the original owner of the town site.
