= America McCutchen Drennan =

American educator and pioneer missionary to Japan

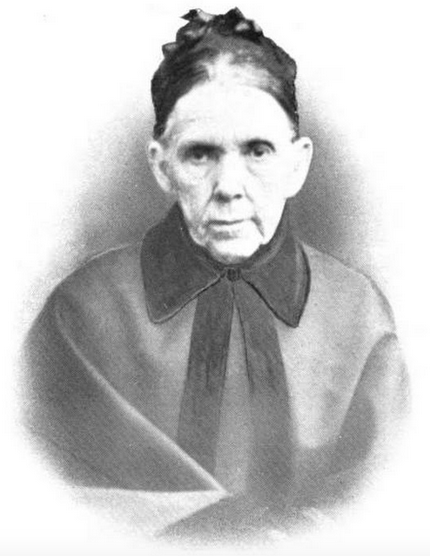
America McCutchen Drennan

America Witherspoon Drennan (née America Missouri McCutchen; July 23, 1830 – June 26, 1903) was an American educator and pioneer missionary to Japan. She did not acquire the Japanese language, and from the beginning of her career as a missionary, she was met with opposition and discouragement but it did not dissuade her. Yet, she organized classes in English language for young men; the Chautauqua Circle was formed and a periodical started; children's meetings and old women's meetings were held; Sunday schools were introduced; a Christian Endeavor Society was organized; and orphanage was started; and a girls' school was opened.

== Biography ==
America Missouri McCutchen was born in Pilot Grove Township, Cooper County, Missouri, July 23, 1830. Her father, John McCutchen, a Virginian by birth, soon after the close of the American Revolutionary War moved to southern Kentucky and located in what is known as the "Cumberland Country". Her mother, Annie Motherel, was born in North Carolina, but in early childhood, moved with her parents to Wilson County, Tennessee, and settled near where the city of Nashville, Tennessee, now stands. She married Mr. McCutchen in 1806, and they made their home in Kentucky. Mrs. McCutchen was a convert of the "great revival of 1800", that religious awakening that swept over Kentucky and Tennessee, resulting in the organization of the Cumberland Presbyterian Church. Mrs. McCutchen was a member of the Woman's Missionary Society organized at Russellville, Kentucky.

When about eight years old, Drennan attended school in the neighborhood, accompanied by a male cousin, whose father was Rev. Robert Bell (1770-1853). She was educated at the Missouri Female College in Boonville, Missouri. After graduating, she returned to the same school for a post-graduate course.

== Career ==
=== Teacher ===
In 1848, while attending the post-graduate course, she became engaged to be married to Rev. Finis Anderson Witherspoon (1826-1863), a young minister of the Cumberland Presbyterian Church. They married on September 18, 1850. Mr. Witherspoon was pastor at Kinmundy, Illinois, where he died on October 26, 1863. Subsequently, she returned to her home in Missouri. She had the care of two orphan children, the son and daughter of Mr. Witherspoon's brother, and Drennan's father was growing feeble, so she felt it necessary to stay near him. She secured a position as a teacher in the Missouri Female College. Here, her influence was such that, in a short time, everyone connected with it was converted to Christianity, and a revival started which reached many in the town outside of the school. After the American Civil War, which ended in 1865, she stopped teaching to devote herself to the care of her aged father and the two adopted children.

After her father's death, she married Rev. James Alexander Drennan, on January 28, 1868. He was pastor of the Cumberland Presbyterian Church at Lexington, Missouri. He died October 31, 1869. A month later their only child, a son, thirteen months old, died, too. She then began teaching at Lexington, having to provide for the education of two daughters, Mary (b. 1856) and Jane (b. 1863), of Mr. Drennan. With some variation she continued for several years as a teacher, part of the time at Oxford, Mississippi.

=== Development of the Women's Board of Missions ===
In 1880, when the call came through the papers for the women of the Cumberland Presbyterian Church to organize a Board of Missions, Drennan responded to the call, and met with other women of the church in Evansville, Indiana, for the purpose of considering the matter. The organization was established, and Drennan was made chairman of the committee to select the location of the Board. Not long after this, a member of the Assembly's Board suggested that they ask Drennan to go to the foreign field. Before she accepted, one of the women said, "Oh, what good can one of your age do there?" One more year passed, and Drennan attended the second meeting of the Board, which convened at Bowling Green, Kentucky. At this meeting, Drennan suggested the organization of synodical and presbyterial societies. She also suggested the circular letter plan that was adopted and used successfully in many of our presbyteries. She was appointed synodical vice president of Missouri, which office she accepted, hoping to find satisfaction in this work. She organized some societies, but the work did not prosper.

Again, at McMinnville, Tennessee, she returned to teaching, but this work, formerly something she enjoyed doing, had now become irksome to her. She gave up the school and determined to offer herself to the Board of Missions, with the knowledge that she would have gone even had her application to the Board been rejected. After due consideration by the members of the Board she was accepted. The consecration service was held in the lecture room of the First Cumberland Presbyterian church at Evansville in March, 1883. From there, Drennan hastened on to Missouri to say goodbye to relatives, having already said good-bye to Kentucky friends; her visit to Missouri was saddened by the unexpected death of her oldest sister. After a few days spent with each member of her family, she headed to Kansas City, Missouri, and then spent a week in San Francisco.

=== Missionary to Japan ===
==== Osaka ====
Drennan sailed away on April 19, 1883, reaching Osaka, Japan on May 5, 1883. She was then 53 years old. Though she was thrilled to be in Japan, she was unable speak the language. As soon as her trunks arrived and her room was arranged, she began to look for something to do. Three days after her arrival, three young men came to her and asked to learn English. One of them already had some knowledge of the language, and through him she taught the others. She gave them a book on physiology. In studying this, they were led to talk of the human body and its structure; and from there, she led the conversation to Christianity. The students advanced so rapidly that by June 1, they had completed the work on physiology, and she put them on the regular Chautauqua course, the book they had studied being the first book of the course for that year. This was the beginning of the Chautauqua work in Japan. She had no idea at the time of its reaching beyond the circle of students in her own room, but within five months after she reached Japan, in October 1883, she had regularly organized the Chautauqua Circle.

Knowing that through the young men in her class, she could reach other people, she devoted much time to them, providing them with entertainment and preparing a pleasant room where they could come for recreation. The Chautauqua Circle continued to widen, including men and women, in a short time numbering 1,200 members. Through the influence of this work, many were prompted to send for Bibles. "The Mission", in speaking of this branch of the work, said: "It is of incalculable worth in the work."

On July 20, 1883, a Japanese festival was held in the city. Drennan was persuaded by her pupils to go with them to see the exhibit, which was indeed a unique sight to American eyes. It was the festival of the god of that section. All this was extremely interesting to Drennan, and she remained on the streets so long that she was overcome by the heat, and forced to resort to the ever-ready and convenient jinrikisha, to be brought back to her boarding house. She was so prostrated from the sun exposure and crowd that it became necessary for her to leave the city; accordingly, on the last of July she went to the mountains for rest. The stay in the mountains not proving beneficial, she remained only one week, but spent the remainder of the vacation as Kobe, by the seaside. It was a good place to rest. Miyoshi San and others of her pupils visited her at Kobe, and the time was spent in teaching English and learning what she could of the Japanese language.

In August 1883, the mission bought a lot on the Concession in Osaka for the purpose of beginning a school. There were three houses on this lot, which were used for dwelling-, boarding-, and schoolhouses. In September, Drennan moved into one of these houses and resumed her classes of young men. These classes increased so rapidly that it became necessary to have afternoon and night sessions. Three times each week during the fall and winter, she held children's meetings in different parts of the city. The three young men who were her first pupils assisted in this work. She first taught the young men the Bible lesson, a picture story, and the songs to sing, and they afterward repeated it all to the children. The rooms were often filled with children, and many grown people stood about the doors, eager to see what it was that pleased the children so much. This work was kept up until stopped by the priests.

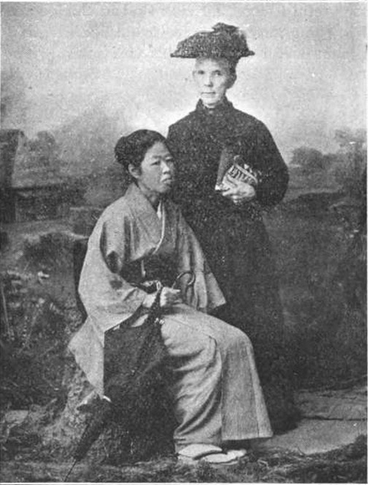
O Yone Hara San (Daisy) & Drennan

The second week of October 1883, Drennan was requested to take for her own a baby who was one year old. She was teaching her Bible class when the parents came to her house with two of their children. The baby, Drennan called Daisy. The boy, whom the parents brought as nurse for the baby, was six years old, and too small, Drennan thought, for such a task, so a nurse was hired. But the boy, Shozo, was allowed to remain and go to school until he grew too large for a girls' school. Then Drennan sent him to his father, who had prospered in business. Daisy was bright, and soon learned to speak English, and to sing and play on the organ.

In the fall of 1883, while waiting for the opening of the girls' school, which took place in January, 1884, Drennan organized a Christian Endeavor Society. She was assisted in this work by Nishi San, who was an elder in the church at Osaka. The society grew very rapidly, and soon published a paper for free distribution, called Words of Life. Four hundred copies each month were published. The meetings were held in her rooms. This was the first Christian Endeavor Society in Japan.

===== Wilmina School for Girls =====
On January 8, 1884, the Wilmina School for Girls (now Osaka Jogakuin University) was opened with four pupils, three girls and the little boy, Shozo San. By June, seventeen pupils were enrolled. For some reason, the English-speaking teacher, Drennan's interpreter, was removed, and Drennan was left with no one in the house who could speak to her in English. As she only knew a few Japanese words, she was forced to govern chiefly by signs. The need of more room was of even greater necessity than an interpreter, but it was some time before a new school building was erected to accommodate the rapidly increasing patronage. It was finished and they moved into it on May 19, 1887. From this time, under her management, the school not only paid all expenses, including teachers' salaries, and for all needed furniture and repairs, but at the close of the year, paid a small sum into the treasury of the mission.

The following year, she enrolled 45 boarding pupils and 105 day pupils. She began a night class for men in the spring of 1887 on Dojima Island this being one of the many small islands into which the city of Osaka is divided by the two rivers and numerous canals which pass through it. She had a large number of pupils every night studying the Bible after English lessons. She was at this place the night that the school building was burned, on February 8, 1888. She was not permitted to continue work at this place very long on account of the accumulation of school duties, caused by the sickness and retirement of Miss Renzer from the school. There was a fine prospect for building up a good church at Dojima. The Baptists took it soon after Drennan left.

Drennan lost everything by the fire, but she had many influential friends, who secured her a home in the city where she lived as their guest, and the next week after the fire, she resumed her school work. By this fire, the school was well advertised, so that there were more day-pupils than before, and notwithstanding the great loss sustained and the want of room which compelled her to give up some of her boarders, it was more than self-sustaining. She kept a strict financial record of the school's standing. Drennan's school work in Osaka ended in 1888.

===== Woman's class and orphanage =====
In September, 1885, Drennan organized a woman's class. She first taught them English, cooking, and fancy work, but they soon became interested in Christianity, and came regularly for Bible study. They were chiefly the wives of officers. At first, this class was small, but it grew until it numbered 40. On New Year's Day, 1887, Mr. Soto, who was president of the government revenue department, came to thank her for teaching his wife, and the next week engaged her to teach in the revenue department office. She had 30 pupils among the officers of this department, Mr. Soto being among the number. They were all deeply interested in Christianity. She taught them until the close of the school in 1888.

It had long been her wish to establish an orphanage, to be supported by the married women's class, which by now had 30 members. The women worked with Drennan to prepare bedding and clothes for this purpose. They put up a considerable sum of money. Drennan secured government permission, and 13 orphans were brought to the orphanage through legal channels. She had the assurance of the support and assistance of the men in Osaka, who had proffered all the aid she needed in the enterprise. However, this work was deemed inexpedient by the Woman's Board in America, and was abandoned.

==== Nagoya ====
The accumulation of care and work, together with crowded sleeping apartments and bad water, caused her health to fail, and she was compelled to resign from the school. She went to Nagoya with her helper in October 1888, where she engaged in direct evangelistic work. At first there was great opposition to Christianity' in Nagoya because the people thought it was Roman Catholicism, which the government forbade them to believe. But Drennan's tactful plan soon weakened the old prejudice. She obtained permission to organize a women's school. This work began in November with only two pupils, but she knew not discouragement, and very soon, through Bible classes for young men, and inquiry meetings for all, a little church grew, which was organized with ten members in January, 1889. In Nagoya, she left a little church of 30 members, and 13 yen in the bank. Five native preachers grew out of her work.

About March 7, 1889, the president of the government school sent an urgent request to Drennan to come to Yokkaichi, a station about 20 miles (32 km) from Nagoya. For years, this had been a sealed city, the people saying that no Christian should live there. Drennan responded to the call. The result of this one visit was a class of ten names signed for Bible study. She made weekly visits until a preaching place was opened, and an earnest class of Bible students formed. Miss Rezner then took charge of the work.

==== Ueno and Tsu ====
After the union of all the Presbyterian bodies in Japan, it was thought best that Drennan's church of 30 members, which was now meeting its own running expenses, should unite with the other Presbyterians in Nagoya. Her school was also turned over to them, and Drennan was transferred to Iga-Ueno, a city of 15,000 inhabitants in the interior of Japan. There was no Christian in the province of Iga. She first selected a location for her home, and fitted up a room near-by for a church. Immediately she set about organizing Sunday schools, Bible classes, English classes, and working classes. The people of Ueno did not know of Christianity, but they did know of Drennan's aptness in teaching English, and that was what they wished. At this time, the study of English was quite popular among the upper classes of Japanese. In response to their call she said to them: "I will teach you English, because through that I hope to be able to win you to listen to the teachings of the Bible." Her two boys, as she sometimes styled the young men who were her first student in Japan, and whom she had placed in school, helped her whenever they could get a day out of school. These two young men, Kimmura San and Matsuda San, were both studying for the ministry. Work was carried on in five other parts of the city.

In September, 1891, with money sent her by two young me from Kentucky, she rented a house in the best part of the city, where the people were wealthy but hard to reach. She had a Sunday school there every Sunday, and preaching every Saturday night, with a woman's meeting on Sunday afternoons. The interest grew, and in a few months, some of the men in high office were interested. It was at this point that she organized what she called her second church. It was named the Mukaijima Church. In May, 1892, the Christian women of Ueno united with Drennan to hold the first annual woman's meeting. In June 1892, Matsuda San having graduated, he at once became pastor of the church at Ueno. Drennan, at her own expense, had kept him in school six years. She was now relieved of the responsibility of the Ueno work.

Instead of going to the mountains for rest, she and her helper secured passports and started for Hida Province. It was three days' travel by jinrikisha after leaving the railroad to the capital of the province, Takayama, and they were detained four days in travel by the breaking of 0 Yone San's jinrikisha. The day that she was sixty-two years old, July 23, 1892, Drennan walked much of the way up the steep mountain side in the rain. There were frequent earthquakes, preceded by rumblings, and ending in explosions. She was the only foreign woman who had ever been in this province, and although the people were very curious, they were never uncivil. The chief of police sent an escort with her when she wished to go out on the streets, lest she might receive rudeness. They seemed to think that she had greatly honored them by her visit. Even the Roman Catholics had never reached this point, and to her it seemed a much neglected but important field. She expected to remain there one month looking over the field, but very soon news came of sickness in the church at Ueno. The young pastor had been called away to see his mother, who was dying, so, without having time to rest from her journey, she was compelled to return to Ueno, feeling that the duty lying nearest now was to comfort her troubled people at home. The result of this visit to Takayama is seen in the establishment of a mission there by the Episcopal Church, the Cumberland Presbyterian Church not feeling able to undertake the work at that time.

She returned to Ueno, taking up the work there in the absence of Matsuda San. There were now 12 places for holding service in that city and a church of 60 members. The preachers there were Matsuda San, Ohira, and a licentiate. In September, 1893, she began work at Tsu, the capital of Ise Province. She placed Mr. Kimura in charge of the work at Tsu, while she divided her time, spending half here and half at Ueno. These cities were 60 miles apart. When at Tsu, she slept and ate in Japanese fashion, and had no fire in her room; the winter was intensely cold, and the frequent changes gave her cold, but she kept up this practice of alternating every two weeks until the last of January, when she was compelled to go to Kyoto for treatment.

Drennan remained in Kyoto until March 1893, when she returned to her home in Ueno so feeble that her physicians wrote a letter recommending that she go to her native country for health. The Board of Missions wrote her that the time had come for her return. Very soon, a letter came from Drennan saying that she was fully restored to good health. Drennan's work was really not in a condition that she could with propriety leave it at this time. There were four girls whose support had been promised by societies in America, but for some reason had been given up. These she could not turn out into the world uncared for, so she kept up their support herself.

She planned a system of village work to be carried out by women, so that every village in Iga was to be visited, and work established wherever there was an opening. As the work was well organized at Ueno, she moved to Tsu in January, 1893, where her life represented the same busy line of teaching, visiting and holding religious service. But with all this, she found time to write letters of instruction weekly to the women of the church at Ueno, and through the Bible class women there kept up the work among the women.

=== Return to the U.S. in 1893 ===
There was much opposition to Christianity at this place also. Children who attended the Sunday school were threatened by the Roman Catholic priests, and degraded in their classes, and made the butt of ridicule until driven from the school. Notwithstanding the work was so difficult, in a few months, she had established a flourishing church. But the physical condition of Drennan later on made a return to the U.S. imperative. In July 1893, just before leaving Tsu, she wrote that she had succeeded in having all her girls provided for during her absence, and also had arranged her work so that it would not suffer. With Daisy satisfactorily provided for, Drennan left Japan on August 5, 1893, on the steamer Peking, and reached Pueblo, Colorado, August 31, where she remained a few days with her sister. Then she came to Missouri, spending a short time with her brother, before hastening to Franklin, Kentucky, that she might see her aged sister before her death. She remained in the United States until August, 1894, making just one year's absence from Japan. She spoke of the voyage to the U.S. as being restful; and this was the only rest she experienced during her visit as she had speaking engagements at least once a week, visiting 33 towns in 11 different States.

=== Return to Japan in 1894 ===
Drennan was accompanied to Japan by Mrs. Lyon and Miss Alexander. During the voyage there was a storm in which Drennan fell, striking her side on the edge of a cot. This injury gave her trouble afterwards, but she never complained, even to her relatives. Rev. E. E. Morris and the church in Marshall, Missouri, with the consent of the Board of Missions, undertook the support of Drennan after her return to Japan. But it was never enough. Once back in Japan, Drennan found the church at Tsu in great need of help. The Ueno church had also suffered during her absence; but very soon she secured the services of a good native preacher for the church at Tsu, and a man was placed at Ueno.

As soon as Drennan was partially relieved of the care of these two churches, she went to Shiroko, 12 miles (19 km) away. There she rented a chapel, fitted it up, and left a young man in charge of the work. With the assistance of Mrs. Lyon, the Bible Training School was opened, Drennan spending three hours each day teaching a Bible lesson, which was repeated many times by the Bible women as they went from house to house. The work at Shiroko met with much opposition from the Roman Catholic priests. She immediately returned to Tsu, and started, with her helper and three other girls, to go the additional ten miles to Shiroko in jinrikishas. They took with them a baby organ. After re-establishing their pastor in Shiroko, Drennan returned the same day to Tsu, in time for her regular work that day consisting of women's meetings; weekly meetings at home for those who would not attend church; Sunday schools, morning and afternoon; morning and night preaching on Sundays; Christian Endeavor Society, and Bible women's class each day. One of the most interesting societies was the old women's class, where none under fifty years old were admitted.

Between Tsu, Shiroko, and Ueno, Drennan attended and superintended twelve weekly, five monthly, two semi-monthly meetings each month, with the prospect shortly of opening work in two other towns, this being in addition to Bible Training School, home duties, and general oversight of all the woman's work. In the fall of 1896, in her round of work, Drennan found a family consisting of a mother, two sons and three daughters, all very old and very poor people. They had given a five-year-old girl child a home, not from any feeling benevolence, but with the design of selling her for sex work. With the aid of the chief of police, Drennan secured the child, whom she adopted. The child did not know her name but was called Faith.

In 1898, the Woman's Christian Temperance Union work was introduced, and a society organized with 20 members. Perhaps the most important new work started that year was the tent work, which began in September, with Mr. Banno preaching and distributing tracts to large audiences in Ueno.

In the spring of 1900, at one time every member of Drennan's group, consisting of fifteen girls, had Influenza. She also had two severe attacks from which she was slow to recover. She arranged to accommodate many of the missionaries whom, on account of the plague in Osaka, she knew would wish to spend the summer away from there. Through her influence, a very wealthy man consented to have a number of cottages built near the sea. Drennan succeeded in getting four comfortable cottages built, where the missionaries could have a summer's rest. Her philanthropy did not stop here. She wrote to the consul to send her four or five families of refugees from China, who had barely escaped with their lives. To these she offered places free of rent. In September 1900, Drennan returned from the beach to Tsu, and took up her regular work, opening school on September 17.

In the year 1901, a great wave of religious influence swept over that country, known as the "Twentieth Century Movement in Japan." The summer of this year, Drennan regarded as the hottest she had ever known. She had recovered from La Grippe, but she did not go out as much as usual, because more important work came to the house, and she now had well-trained girls who could relieve her of much of the outside labor.

=== Return to the U.S. in 1902 ===
A letter from the Mission Board in September 1902 said that Drennan should leave Japan in October and not spend another winter in Japan because of having had influenza. Drennan left Japan October 15, 1902, bringing with her two Japanese girls: Daisy, who had been with her from infancy; and O Tsura San. After a rough voyage of ten days, she landed in San Francisco October 28. They stopped at a hotel nearly two weeks, for rest from the voyage. From San Francisco they went to San Jose, California. She next spent ten days with her cousin, Rev. Nathan Motherel, at Hanford, California, before reaching Pueblo, Colorado. In March, she attended Presbytery at Colorado Springs, Colorado. After four days, she returned to her sister, Mrs. Bell, worn out. Another short rest and she went to Cañon City, Colorado, before returning to her sister's home for more rest.

Drennan had planned to attend the meeting of the Woman's Board at Huntsville, Alabama, and also to visit friends in Kentucky and Tennessee. After resting at Pueblo, Colorado, she left May 5, 1903, traveling until she had reached Holden, Missouri, the home of her nephew, Mr. McCutchen. She was unable to continue the journey, and was quite ill until she rallied, and on May 24, accompanied by Mr. McCutchen, she went to Pilot Grove, Missouri, the home of her childhood, to visit Mrs. List, her niece. One of the Japanese girls, Daisy, she left with her sister, Mrs. Bell, at Pueblo, Colorado, but O Tsura San went with Drennan as her companion and nurse. When the rainy season came, Drennan grew listless, was not inclined to talk, and had no appetite. Two weeks before she died, the Drennan Mission Band met at Mrs. List's home. The next day, she canceled an engagement in Texas. Two of her nieces were with her, but O Tsura San was by her bedside constantly. She sent for Mr. McCutchen and spoke to him of her burial, and expressed her satisfaction that he had had the family burying ground put in order. She gave directions for her funeral expenses, and requested that the small amount left over be given to the two Japanese girls, Daisy and O Tsura San. Drennan died June 26, 1903. She was buriedat the old Mt. Vernon cemetery next to her first husband, Rev. Mr. Witherspoon, her father, brother, sister, and other family members.
