= Missouri Route 179 =

State highway in Missouri, U.S.

Route 179
- Gateway Drive
- MO 179 highlighted in red

Route information
- Maintained by MoDOT
- Length: 42.965 mi (69.145 km)

Major junctions
- South end: US 54 / Route B in Jefferson City
- US 50 / US 50 Bus. in Jefferson City; Route 87 near Jamestown; I-70 east of Boonville
- North end: Route 98 east of Boonville

Location
- Country: United States
- State: Missouri
- Counties: Cole; Moniteau; Cooper

Highway system
- Missouri State Highway System; Interstate; US; State; Supplemental
← Route 177	→ Route 180

Route 179 is a highway in central Missouri. From its northern terminus at the interchange of Interstate 70 and Route 98, it winds its way Southeast over low rolling hills and through the flood plain along the Missouri River to Jefferson City, where it bypasses the city to the West via a four-lane divided highway between U.S. Route 50 and U.S. Route 54, its southern terminus. Towns on Route 179 are Overton, Wooldridge, Jamestown, Sandy Hook, Marion, and Jefferson City.

== Major intersections ==
County	Location	mi	km	Destinations	Notes
Cole	Jefferson City	0.000	0.000	US 54 / Route B – Jefferson City, Wardsville, Lake of the Ozarks	Interchange
Cole	Jefferson City	1.121	1.804	Route C – Russellville	Interchange
Cole	Jefferson City	2.053	3.304	Mission Drive	Interchange; access to SSM Health St. Mary's Hospital
Cole	Jefferson City	2.849	4.585	Edgewood Drive	
Cole	Jefferson City	3.496	5.626	US 50 Bus. (Missouri Boulevard)	Interchange for US 50 Business
Cole	Jefferson City	3.599	5.792	US 50 / Lewis and Clark Trail east – Linn, Sedalia	interchange for US 50; south end of Lewis and Clark Trail overlap
Moniteau	Jamestown	26.785	43.106	Route 87 south / Route U – California	Southern end of Route 87 concurrency
Moniteau	Linn Township	30.049	48.359	Route 87 north – Prairie Home	Northern end of Route 87 concurrency
Cooper	Saline Township	42.848	68.957	I-70 – Kansas City, Columbia	Exit 111 (I-70)
Cooper	Saline Township	42.965	69.145	Route 98 to Route 87 / Lewis and Clark Trail – Overton	Lewis and Clark Trail turns west onto MO 98
1.000 mi = 1.609 km; 1.000 km = 0.621 mi: Concurrency terminus

== See also ==
- List of state highways in Missouri
