= Boonesboro, Missouri =

Unincorporated community in Missouri, U.S.

Coordinates: 39°04′37″N 92°50′30″W

Boonesboro is a community in Howard County, Missouri, United States. It is located on Route 87 midway between Boonville and Glasgow in the historical Boone's Lick country.

The community was laid out in 1840 on the Boone's Lick Road and is named for frontiersman Daniel Boone. Boone's Lick State Historic Site is approximately two miles to the west on Missouri Route 187. The approximate population of the town is 150 citizens.
