= Rupe Branch =

Stream in the American state of Missouri

Coordinates: 38.978361°N 92.751019°W

Rupe Branch (also called Roupes Branch) is a stream in Cooper County in the U.S. state of Missouri.

Rupe Branch was named after Gilland Roupe, a pioneer citizen.

== See also ==
- List of rivers of Missouri
