= Heath Creek Township, Pettis County, Missouri =

Inactive township in the American state of Missouri

Coordinates: 38.8639°N 93.1144°W

Heath Creek Township is an inactive township in Pettis County, in the U.S. state of Missouri.

Heath Creek Township was erected in 1844, taking its name from Heaths Creek.
