= Petersburg, Missouri =

Unincorporated community in Missouri, U.S.

Coordinates: 38.519183°N 93.846605°W

Petersburg is an unincorporated community in Henry County, Missouri, United States.

== History ==
Variant names were "Carrsville" and "Petersburgh". Petersburg was originally called Carrsville, and under the latter name was founded in the 1870s, taking its name from Carrsville Mill. A post office called Carrsville was established in 1872, the name was changed to Petersburgh in 1881, and the post office closed in 1902. The present name honors Peter Lane, a local merchant.
