= Hickory Branch =

Stream in the American state of Missouri

Coordinates: 38.9153025°N 92.8196344°W

Hickory Branch is a stream in Cooper County in the U.S. state of Missouri.

Hickory Branch was named for the hickory timber lining its course.

== See also ==
- List of rivers of Missouri
