= Thomas Branch (Missouri River tributary) =

Stream in the American state of Missouri

Coordinates: 38.970582°N 92.791854°W

Thomas Branch is a stream in Cooper County in the U.S. state of Missouri. It is a tributary of the Missouri River.

Thomas Branch was named after a local family near its course.

== See also ==
- List of rivers of Missouri
