= Arrow Rock Township, Saline County, Missouri =

Inactive township in Missouri, U.S.

Coordinates: 39.0711°N 93.0183°W

Arrow Rock Township is an inactive township in Saline County, in the U.S. state of Missouri.

Arrow Rock Township was erected in 1822, taking its name from the community of Arrow Rock, Missouri.
