= Heaths Creek =

Stream in the American state of Missouri

Coordinates: 38°55′19″N 93°01′09″W

Heaths Creek is a stream in Cooper, Pettis and Saline counties in the U.S. state of Missouri. It is a tributary of the Lamine River.

Heaths Creek was named after John G. Heath, a pioneer citizen.

== See also ==
- List of rivers of Missouri
