= Franklin Township, Howard County, Missouri =

Township in Howard County, Missouri, U.S.

Coordinates: 39.0283°N 92.7486°W

Franklin Township is an inactive township in Howard County, in the U.S. state of Missouri.

Franklin Township was erected in 1821.
