= Windsor Place, Missouri =

- Village
- Interactive map of Windsor Place, Missouri
- Coordinates: 38°56′03″N 92°42′11″W
- Country: United States
- State: Missouri
- County: Cooper

Area
  - Total: 0.90 sq mi (2.32 km^{2})
  - Land: 0.90 sq mi (2.32 km^{2})
  - Water: 0 sq mi (0.00 km^{2})
- Elevation: 617 ft (188 m)

Population (2020)
  - Total: 358
  - Density: 399.2/sq mi (154.13/km^{2})
- ZIP code: 65233
- Area code: 660
- FIPS code: 29-80380
- GNIS feature ID: 2399714
- Website: www.windsorplacemo.com

Windsor Place is a village in Cooper County, Missouri, United States. It was incorporated in 2006. As of the 2020 census, Windsor Place had a population of 358.

== Geography ==
The community lies just west of Missouri Route 87 and less than one half mile (0.8 km) south of I-70. Booneville is approximately three miles (4.82 km) to the northwest.

According to the United States Census Bureau, the village has a total area of 0.20 square miles (0.52 km^{2}), all land.

== Demographics ==
Historical population
| Census | Pop. | Note | %± |
|---|---|---|---|
| 2010 | 309 | | — |
| 2020 | 358 | | 15.9% |
U.S. Decennial Census

=== 2010 census ===
As of the census of 2010, there were 309 people, 113 households, and 92 families residing in the village. The population density was 1,545.0 inhabitants per square mile (596.5/km^{2}). There were 119 housing units at an average density of 595.0 per square mile (229.7/km^{2}). The racial makeup of the village was 92.2% White, 1.3% African American, 2.3% Asian, 0.6% from other races, and 3.6% from two or more races. Hispanic or Latino of any race were 1.9% of the population.

There were 113 households, of which 42.5% had children under the age of 18 living with them, 60.2% were married couples living together, 16.8% had a female householder with no husband present, 4.4% had a male householder with no wife present, and 18.6% were non-families. 16.8% of all households were made up of individuals, and 4.4% had someone living alone who was 65 years of age or older. The average household size was 2.73 and the average family size was 3.00.

The median age in the village was 33.6 years. 29.1% of residents were under the age of 18; 7.7% were between the ages of 18 and 24; 30% were from 25 to 44; 21.7% were from 45 to 64; and 11.3% were 65 years of age or older. The gender makeup of the village was 46.6% male and 53.4% female.
