= Glasgow Bridge (Missouri) =

Coordinates: 39.2224°N 92.8503°W

- Carries: Route 240
- Crosses: Missouri River
- Locale: Howard County, Missouri

Characteristics
- Total length: 2,243.5 feet
- Width: 20.3 feet
- Longest span: 343.7 feet
- No. of spans: 5

History
- Construction end: 1925
- Opened: September 2009
- Rebuilt: 2009

The Glasgow Bridge carries Missouri Route 240 over the Missouri River between Cambridge Township and Glasgow, Missouri.

== Original bridge ==
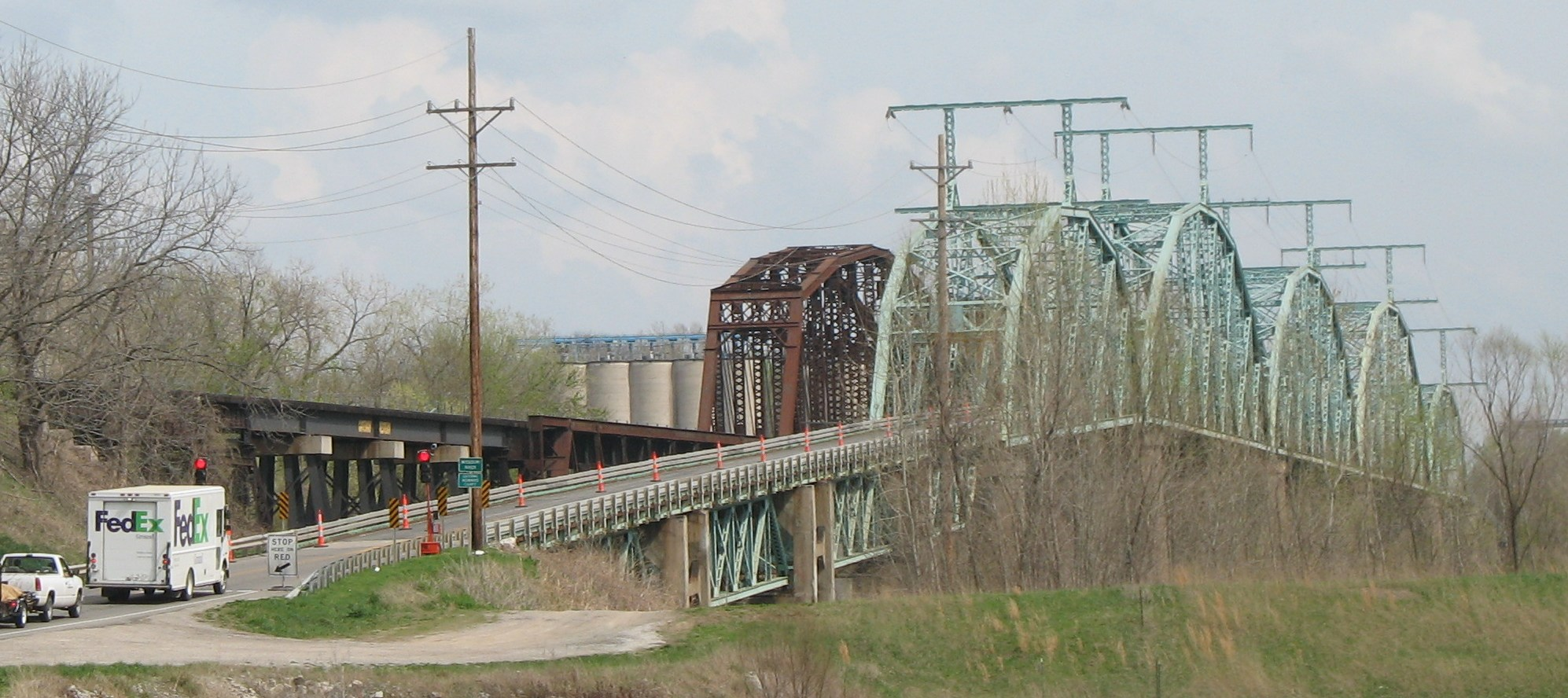
Old Glasgow Bridge (right) from southwest along with rail bridge upstream from it

The original bridge was a five-span through truss bridge built in 1878–79 and rehabilitated in 1986. Its main span was 343.7 feet and its total length was 2,243.5 feet. It had a deck width of 20.3 feet and vertical clearance of 14.8 feet. It was narrowed to a single lane in its final few years (with stoplights on either side) before being closed and replaced in 2008–09.

== Current bridge ==
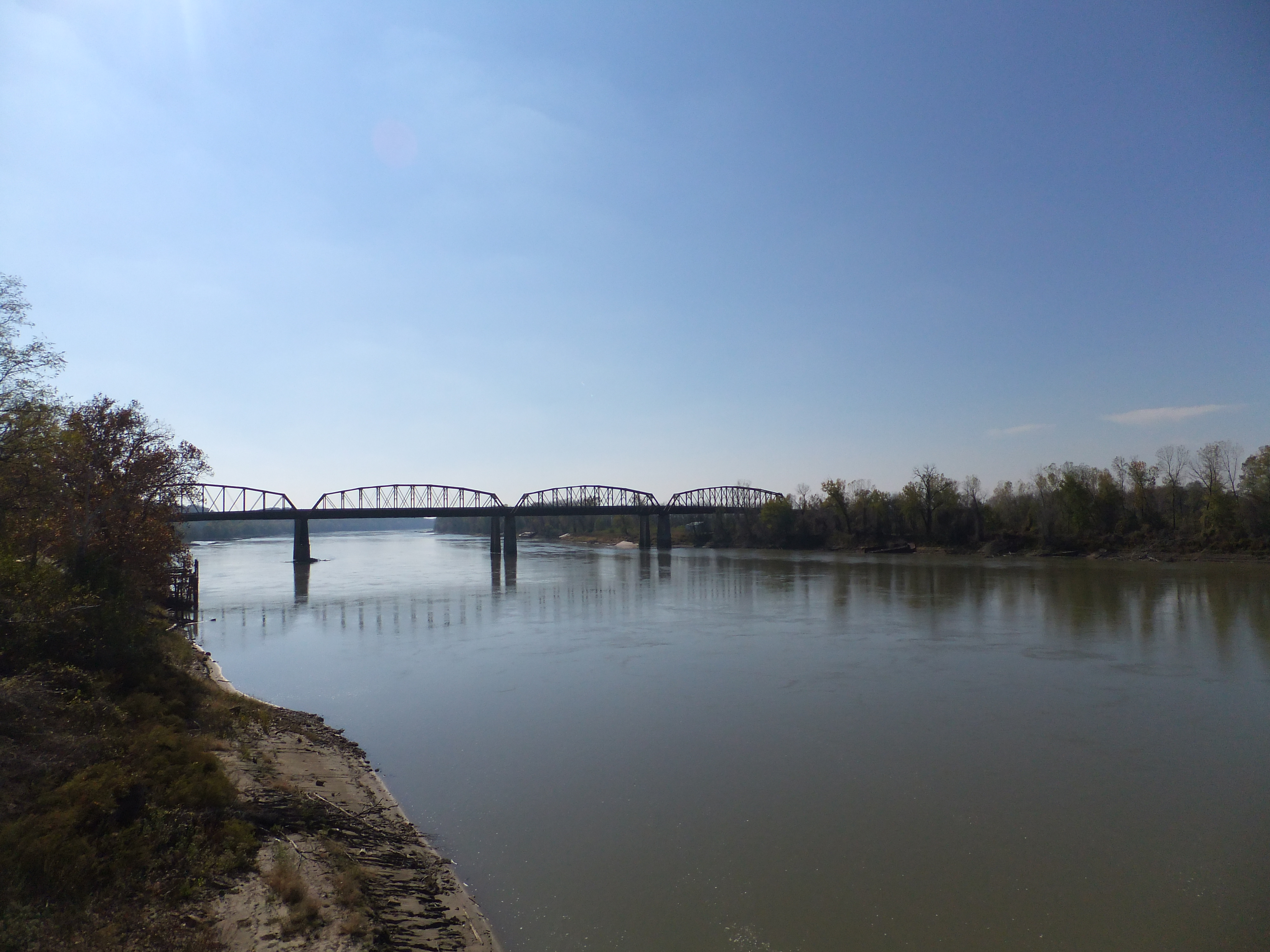
The new bridge along with the railroad bridge in 2021

The new bridge opened in September 2009 and the project was completed in autumn of that year.

== See also ==
- List of crossings of the Missouri River
