= Boonslick Township, Howard County, Missouri =

Township in Howard County, Missouri, U.S.

Coordinates: 39.0714°N 92.8717°W

Boonslick Township is an inactive township in Howard County, in the U.S. state of Missouri.

Boonslick Township was erected in 1821, taking its name from frontiersman Daniel Boone.
