= Overton, Missouri =

Unincorporated community in the US state of Missouri

Coordinates: 38°56′52″N 92°34′35″W

Overton is an unincorporated community in northeast Cooper County, in the U.S. state of Missouri. The community is adjacent to the south edge of the Missouri River floodplain. Missouri Route 98 passes through the community and I-70 passes approximately 1/2 mile to the south. Boonville is eight miles to the west and Wooldridge is four miles to the southeast adjacent to the Cooper-Moniteau county line.

== History ==
Overton was laid out in 1901, and named in honor of William B. Overton, the original owner of the town site. A post office called Overton was established in 1864, and remained in operation until 1944.
