= Wooldridge, Missouri =

- Village
- Location of Wooldridge, Missouri
- Coordinates: 38°54′24″N 92°31′17″W
- Country: United States
- State: Missouri
- County: Cooper

Area
  - Total: 0.062 sq mi (0.16 km^{2})
  - Land: 0.062 sq mi (0.16 km^{2})
  - Water: 0 sq mi (0.00 km^{2})
- Elevation: 581 ft (177 m)

Population (2020)
  - Total: 28
  - Density: 465.6/sq mi (179.78/km^{2})
- Time zone: UTC-6 (Central (CST))
  - Summer (DST): UTC-5 (CDT)
- ZIP code: 65287
- Area code: 660
- FIPS code: 29-81016
- GNIS feature ID: 2399740

Wooldridge is a village in northeastern Cooper County, Missouri, United States. As of the 2020 census, Wooldridge had a population of 28.

== History ==
Wooldridge was laid out in 1901. The village was named for Dr. Wooldridge, the original owner of the town site. A post office called Wooldridge has been in operation since 1902.

=== 2022 fire ===
On October 22, 2022, a large fire destroyed 23 buildings, about half the town. With a drought and high winds, the fire quickly spread.

== Geography ==
Wooldridge is located on Missouri Route 179 in the northeast corner of Cooper County. The Missouri River floodplain lies adjacent to the northeast side of the community. Boonville lies approximately eleven miles to the northwest. Columbia is nine miles to the northeast in adjacent Boone County.

According to the United States Census Bureau, the village has a total area of 0.06 square miles (0.16 km^{2}), all land.

== Demographics ==
Historical population
Census	Pop.	Note	%±
1910	119		—
1920	160		34.5%
1930	157		−1.9%
1940	178		13.4%
1950	137		−23.0%
1960	100		−27.0%
1970	97		−3.0%
1980	79		−18.6%
1990	54		−31.6%
2000	47		−13.0%
2010	61		29.8%
2020	28		−54.1%
U.S. Decennial Census

=== 2010 census ===
As of the census of 2010, there were 61 people, 32 households, and 15 families living in the village. The population density was 1,016.7 inhabitants per square mile (392.6/km^{2}). There were 39 housing units at an average density of 650.0 per square mile (251.0/km^{2}). The racial makeup of the village was 96.7% White, 1.6% Native American, and 1.6% from other races. Hispanic or Latino of any race were 11.5% of the population.

There were 32 households, of which 21.9% had children under the age of 18 living with them, 25.0% were married couples living together, 15.6% had a female householder with no husband present, 6.3% had a male householder with no wife present, and 53.1% were non-families. 50.0% of all households were made up of individuals. The average household size was 1.91 and the average family size was 2.80.

The median age in the village was 42.8 years. 18% of residents were under the age of 18; 13.2% were between the ages of 18 and 24; 19.7% were from 25 to 44; 46% were from 45 to 64; and 3.3% were 65 years of age or older. The gender makeup of the village was 47.5% male and 52.5% female.

=== 2000 census ===
As of the census of 2000, there were 47 people, 18 households, and 10 families living in the village. The population density was 761.3 inhabitants per square mile (293.9/km^{2}). There were 21 housing units at an average density of 340.1 per square mile (131.3/km^{2}). The racial makeup of the village was 97.87% White, and 2.13% from two or more races.

There were 18 households, out of which 38.9% had children under the age of 18 living with them, 44.4% were married couples living together, 11.1% had a female householder with no husband present, and 38.9% were non-families. 27.8% of all households were made up of individuals, and 5.6% had someone living alone who was 65 years of age or older. The average household size was 2.61 and the average family size was 3.18.

In the village, the population was spread out, with 27.7% under the age of 18, 10.6% from 18 to 24, 34.0% from 25 to 44, 25.5% from 45 to 64, and 2.1% who were 65 years of age or older. The median age was 32 years. For every 100 females, there were 113.6 males. For every 100 females age 18 and over, there were 100.0 males.

The median income for a household in the village was $45,000, and the median income for a family was $45,938. Males had a median income of $25,000 versus $22,500 for females. The per capita income for the village was $13,781. There were 15.4% of families and 29.6% of the population living below the poverty line, including 42.1% of under eighteens and none of those over 64.
