= Clay Township, Missouri =

Clay Township, Missouri may refer to one of the following places in the State of Missouri:

- Clay Township, Adair County, Missouri
- Clay Township, Andrew County, Missouri
- Clay Township, Atchison County, Missouri
- Clay Township, Clark County, Missouri
- Clay Township, Douglas County, Missouri
- Clay Township, Dunklin County, Missouri
- Clay Township, Gasconade County, Missouri
- Clay Township, Greene County, Missouri
- Clay Township, Harrison County, Missouri
- Clay Township, Holt County, Missouri
- Clay Township, Lafayette County, Missouri
- Clay Township, Linn County, Missouri
- Clay Township, Monroe County, Missouri
- Clay Township, Ralls County, Missouri
- Clay Township, Saline County, Missouri
- Clay Township, Shelby County, Missouri
- Clay Township, Sullivan County, Missouri

== See also ==
- Clay Township (disambiguation)
