= Clay Township =

Clay Township may refer to:

== Arkansas ==
- Clay Township, Bradley County, Arkansas, in Bradley County, Arkansas
- Clay Township, Howard County, Arkansas, in Howard County, Arkansas
- Clay Township, White County, Arkansas, in White County, Arkansas

== Indiana ==
- Clay Township, Bartholomew County, Indiana
- Clay Township, Carroll County, Indiana
- Clay Township, Cass County, Indiana
- Clay Township, Dearborn County, Indiana
- Clay Township, Decatur County, Indiana
- Clay Township, Hamilton County, Indiana
- Clay Township, Hendricks County, Indiana
- Clay Township, Howard County, Indiana
- Clay Township, Kosciusko County, Indiana
- Clay Township, LaGrange County, Indiana
- Clay Township, Miami County, Indiana
- Clay Township, Morgan County, Indiana
- Clay Township, Owen County, Indiana
- Clay Township, Pike County, Indiana
- Clay Township, St. Joseph County, Indiana
- Clay Township, Spencer County, Indiana
- Clay Township, Wayne County, Indiana

== Iowa ==
- Clay Township, Clay County, Iowa
- Clay Township, Grundy County, Iowa
- Clay Township, Hardin County, Iowa
- Clay Township, Harrison County, Iowa
- Clay Township, Jones County, Iowa
- Clay Township, Marion County, Iowa, in Marion County, Iowa
- Clay Township, Polk County, Iowa
- Clay Township, Shelby County, Iowa, in Shelby County, Iowa
- Clay Township, Washington County, Iowa
- Clay Township, Wayne County, Iowa
- Clay Township, Webster County, Iowa

== Kansas ==
- Clay Township, Butler County, Kansas
- Clay Township, Reno County, Kansas, in Reno County, Kansas

== Michigan ==
- Clay Township, Michigan

== Minnesota ==
- Clay Township, Minnesota

== Missouri ==
- Clay Township, Adair County, Missouri
- Clay Township, Andrew County, Missouri
- Clay Township, Atchison County, Missouri
- Clay Township, Clark County, Missouri
- Clay Township, Douglas County, Missouri, in Douglas County, Missouri
- Clay Township, Dunklin County, Missouri
- Clay Township, Gasconade County, Missouri
- Clay Township, Greene County, Missouri
- Clay Township, Harrison County, Missouri
- Clay Township, Holt County, Missouri
- Clay Township, Lafayette County, Missouri
- Clay Township, Linn County, Missouri
- Clay Township, Monroe County, Missouri
- Clay Township, Ralls County, Missouri
- Clay Township, Saline County, Missouri
- Clay Township, Shelby County, Missouri
- Clay Township, Sullivan County, Missouri

== North Carolina ==
- Clay Township, Guilford County, North Carolina, in Guilford County, North Carolina

== North Dakota ==
- Clay Township, Renville County, North Dakota, in Renville County, North Dakota

== Ohio ==
- Clay Township, Auglaize County, Ohio
- Clay Township, Gallia County, Ohio
- Clay Township, Highland County, Ohio
- Clay Township, Knox County, Ohio
- Clay Township, Montgomery County, Ohio
- Clay Township, Muskingum County, Ohio
- Clay Township, Ottawa County, Ohio
- Clay Township, Scioto County, Ohio
- Clay Township, Tuscarawas County, Ohio

== Pennsylvania ==
- Clay Township, Butler County, Pennsylvania
- Clay Township, Huntingdon County, Pennsylvania
- Clay Township, Lancaster County, Pennsylvania
