= Missouri Route 131 =

State highway in Missouri, U.S.

Route 131
- MO 131 highlighted in red

Route information
- Maintained by MoDOT
- Length: 38.739 mi (62.344 km)

Major junctions
- South end: Route 2 south of Medford
- Route 58 in Holden; US 50 in Pittsville; I-70 / US 40 in Odessa; US 24 south of Wellington
- North end: Route 224 in Wellington

Location
- Country: United States
- State: Missouri

Highway system
- Missouri State Highway System; Interstate; US; State; Supplemental
← Route 130	→ Route 133

Route 131 is a highway located in Lafayette and Johnson counties in western Missouri. Its northern terminus is at Route 224 in downtown Wellington and its southern terminus is on Route 2 south of Medford.

MoDOT provides a commuter parking lot (gravel) in Odessa near the intersection with I-70.

== Major intersections ==
County	Location	mi	km	Destinations	Notes
Johnson	Rose Hill Township	0.000	0.000	Route 2 – Chilhowee, Harrisonville	
Johnson	Holden	6.867	11.051	Route 58 east (Second Street)	Southern end of Route 58 overlap
Johnson	Holden	6.933	11.158	Route 58 west (Second Street)	Northern end of Route 58 overlap
Johnson	Pittsville	16.108– 17.440	25.923– 28.067	US 50 – Warrensburg, Lee's Summit	Restricted crossing U-turn intersection
Lafayette	Odessa	29.413	47.336	N. Second Street to I-70 east / US 40 east	
Lafayette	Odessa	30.116	48.467	I-70 west / US 40 west – Kansas City	No access to eastbound I-70 / US 40
Lafayette	Clay Township	38.452	61.882	US 24 – Lexington, Levasy	Roundabout
Lafayette	Wellington	39.264	63.189	Route 224 – Napoleon, Lexington	
1.000 mi = 1.609 km; 1.000 km = 0.621 mi: Concurrency terminus; Incomplete access
