= Waterloo, Lafayette County, Missouri =

Unincorporated community in Missouri, U.S.

Waterloo, Missouri
- Unincorporated community
- Location within Missouri
- Coordinates: 39°07′59″N 94°02′04″W
- Country: United States
- State: Missouri
- County: Lafayette
- Elevation: 702 ft (214 m)
- Time zone: UTC-6 (Central (CST))
  - Summer (DST): UTC-5 (CDT)
- Area code: 660
- GNIS feature ID: 728406

Waterloo is a community in Lafayette County, Missouri, United States. The community is located in west central Missouri on MO 224, near the south bank of the Missouri River. Nearby towns include Napoleon, Wellington, and Lexington.

== History ==
Waterloo was laid out in 1905. The community was named in commemoration of the Battle of Waterloo, at which Napoleon surrendered. A post office called Waterloo was established in 1877, and remained in operation until 1909.
