= Missouri Route 224 =

State highway in Missouri, U.S.

Route 224
- MO 224 highlighted in red

Route information
- Maintained by MoDOT
- Length: 13 mi (21 km)
- Existed: 1969–present

Major junctions
- West end: US 24 west of Napoleon
- East end: US 24 near Lexington

Location
- Country: United States
- State: Missouri
- Counties: Lafayette

Highway system
- Missouri State Highway System; Interstate; US; State; Supplemental
← Route 221	→ I-229

Route 224 is a highway in western Missouri. Its eastern terminus is at U.S. Route 24 near Lexington; its western terminus is at US 24 west of Napoleon. It follows the Missouri River and is prone to flooding.

== History ==
Before 1959, U.S. Route 24 used to travel through Napoleon and Lexington. A bypass was finished in 1959 which caused US 24 to reroute onto the bypass. This resulted in the creation of US 24 Business. It remained like that until 1969 when the business route was removed. This led to the creation of Route 224 and still remains like this to this day.

== Major intersections ==
The entire route is in Lafayette County.

Location	mi	km	Destinations	Notes
Clay Township	0.000	0.000	US 24 – Independence	
Napoleon	0.947	1.524	Route D	
Wellington	5.990	9.640	Route 131 south – Odessa	
Lexington	13.193	21.232	Route 13 Bus. south (13th Street)	West end of Route 13 Business overlap
Lexington	14.799– 14.982	23.817– 24.111	Route 13 / Route 13 Bus. ends – Richmond, Higginsville	Interchange; east end of Route 13 Business overlap
Lexington	15.217	24.489	US 24 – Marshall	
1.000 mi = 1.609 km; 1.000 km = 0.621 mi: Concurrency terminus
