= Missouri River Killer =

Unidentified serial killer

- 1991 composite sketch
- Other name: "Avenue Mutilator"

Details
- Victims: 7–12+
- Span of crimes: 1982–1994
- Country: United States
- State: Missouri (known)

The Missouri River Killer is an unidentified American serial killer who committed the murders of seven women and girls in the Kansas City metro area between 1982 and 1994. The victims varied in ages between 13 and 36 and all were found floating in the Missouri River, with several of them having had their legs severed by the perpetrator.

Beginning in the late 1980s, law enforcement agencies in western Missouri investigated a potential serial killer after the bodies of four women were discovered in the river, two of them missing their legs, with all having been last seen alive in Kansas City. Later, the 1991 murder and dismemberment of a 13-year-old Grain Valley girl was linked to the case through modus operandi, and another legless body that turned up in the river in 1994 further reinforced the presence of a serial killer. Additionally, while examining previous homicides, police determined that an earlier 1982 murder of a woman found in the river was likely committed by the same killer.

The case's only suspect, a supply clerk named Gregory Breeden, was never brought to trial due to lack of evidence.

== Murders ==
The killer chose young women and adolescents as victims, most of whom worked as sex workers in Kansas City. On four occasions, the killer dismembered the victims' legs. In total, at least seven females were victims of the killer:

- Annette K. Parker (27) was discovered floating in the Missouri River on May 31, 1982, by two fisherman on the Chouteau Bridge. She was found with a rope tied tightly around her neck and 13 stab wounds were located on her chest. Originally from Omaha, Nebraska, Parker had gone missing over a week prior to her body being found.
- Melody Jo Milliner (24) was found floating in the river in Lafayette County on August 6, 1986. Milliner, of Kansas City, worked as a prostitute and had a 2-year-old daughter. She had regularly helped her father on his farm in Kansas and once told him she was selling information to police about an unknown investigation. One area that she frequented, Independence Avenue, is believed to be where she encountered the killer. Her legs were amputated at the hips and the cause of death was ruled as stabbing.
- Linda Dennis (17) was found badly decomposed north side of the river on May 7, 1988. A native of Kansas City, Dennis was last seen in early April after she left home to go to the store. Dennis was a suspected prostitute and was once even arrested for it, but the charge was eventually dropped. Due to the extensive decomposition, her body could only be identified through dental records. Although the cause of death was never determined, foul play was suspected due to her body being entangled in driftwood.
- Kimberly Rash (19) was found naked and missing both her legs on May 10, 1988, by a fisherman in Ray County. She had gone missing over a month prior, and an autopsy showed she had been stabbed over 31 times in the chest and around her hands. She had a history of arrests for prostitution but was not known to visit Independence Avenue like some of the other victims. Since she was missing her legs, there was immediate speculation among law enforcement that her death could have been related to Milliner's case.
- Rhonda Dennis (16) was discovered floating in the river on May 10, 1988. She had been fatally stabbed 31 times and stripped of her clothes. She was not a known prostitute but did live on Independence Avenue. She was not related to Linda Dennis.
- Beverlie Tracy (13) was found floating in the river near Napoleon on April 15, 1991, eleven days after she was reported missing. She had been fatally shot in the chest and, like the previous victims, both her legs were cut off. On April 3, the day she was last seen, Tracy and her mother had a heated argument at the home of a friend and it only ended when she decided to leave and walk 16 miles to her home in Grain Valley. Later that same day, bystanders claimed that a bearded man driving a brown 1977 Chevy Malibu was seen talking to a girl who resembled Tracy.
- Viola McCoy's (36) torso was found floating in the river on September 13, 1994, a day after one of her legs was found in Lafayette County. A known drug addict, McCoy was last seen on September 8 by her boyfriend, who claimed that she ran off after an argument.

=== Possible ===
- Angela Donald (18) was found dead in the river in Clay County on September 26, 1984. She had been sexually assaulted and beaten to death. Initially, her death was linked with the other murders, but in 1994 a man named Rodney Wayne Marlett confessed to killing Donald, later pleading guilty to manslaughter and received a 14-year prison sentence.
- Viola Barber (23) was discovered afloat near Wellington on August 1, 1985. She was last seen three days prior walking along Independence Avenue, an area where several of the known victims were abducted from.
- Beverly Douthit (31) was discovered nude in the Blue River near Kansas City on August 21, 1985, the cause of death being attributed to a blow to the head. Her death was investigated as possibly being linked to the other bodies that were being found, but by September law enforcement had ruled that her death was unrelated.
- Christina Brandolese (21) was found dead in the early morning hours on May 30, 1989, by a Johnson County homeowner who noticed her body lying near their driveway. Brandolese was a known prostitute who operated in Kansas City, particularly around Independence Avenue. Her throat had been slit and her killer subsequently doused her body with a flammable liquid and lit her on fire.
- Candice Fisher (18), another Kansas City prostitute, was found dead in Johnson County on June 2, 1989, roughly 1.5 miles (2.4 kilometers) from where Brandolese was found. Detectives in Kansas City concluded that the same man, a Caucasian in his late 20s or early 30s, had killed both women, but it is unknown if the man was the elusive Missouri River Killer. It was theorized that a separate serial killer, Richard Grissom of nearby Kansas, could have killed both women, but he was evidently eliminated as a suspect.

== Investigation ==
The FBI joined the investigation in May 1988 after the deaths of Dennis and Rash. They withdrew their investigation after only a month.

The case's first suspect was a Kansas City physician who was accused of drugging and raping two female patients in 1992. After several weeks of newspaper speculation, police chief Skip Hedges added credence to the link by claiming the man had an office on Independence Avenue. However, it was later found that Hedges' claim was false and there was little to no evidence the man was involved in the murders. The man's lawyer mocked Hedges and the press by saying he anticipated they would tie his client with the John F. Kennedy assassination.

=== Gregory Breeden ===
During the investigation, police were notified about Gregory Breeden, a 48-year-old supply clerk who lived in Kansas City. Through investigation on Breeden's background, police learned several major factors; Breeden had served in the United States Navy from 1965 to 1968, during which time he was stationed in California, and he had once been investigated a suspect in the murder of Annette Parker, the first victim associated with the Missouri River Killer. At the time, Breeden claimed that Parker and him were engaged and he was released without charge.

On November 2, 1994, Kansas City police raided Breeden's home as he was asleep, waking him up with a flashlight in his face, and he was promptly arrested on charges of check forgery. While searching his home, police collected 19 knives and clothing that resembled clothes taken from Melody Milliner. In 1996, he was indicted with the murder of Viola McCoy, and the case was to be tried in Boone County. During the time Breeden was incarcerated, ten additional bodies turned up in the Missouri River, a majority of them being prostitutes who operated in Kansas City, but authorities determined that those deaths were unrelated. On April 1, 1999, the charge against Breeden was dropped. He maintained innocence until his death in May 2014.

== See also ==
- List of serial killers in the United States
