= Specker =

Specker is a surname. Notable people with the surname include:

- Ernst Specker (1920–2011), Swiss mathematician
- Joe C. Specker (1921–1944), United States Army soldier and Medal of Honor recipient
- Alexander Specker (born 1918–circa 2007), Swiss sports shooter

== See also ==
- Specker See, lake in Mecklenburg-Vorpommern, Germany
- Specker sequence, bounded sequence
- Baer–Specker group, Abelian group
- Kochen–Specker theorem, quantum mechanics theorem
