= Pedlar Creek (Arapahoe Creek tributary) =

Stream in northwest Missouri, U.S.

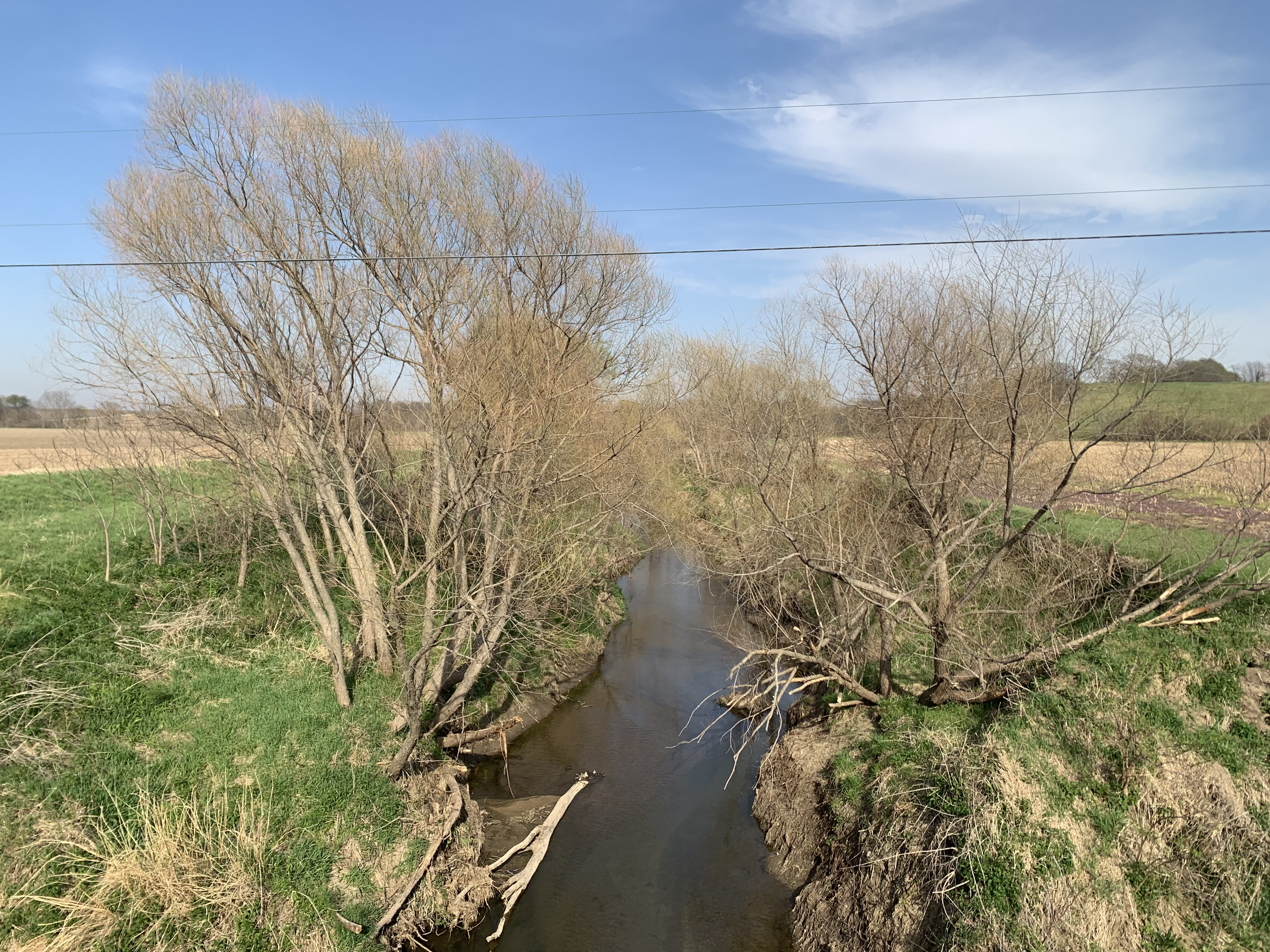
- Newland Creek on Route H bridge north of Fillmore

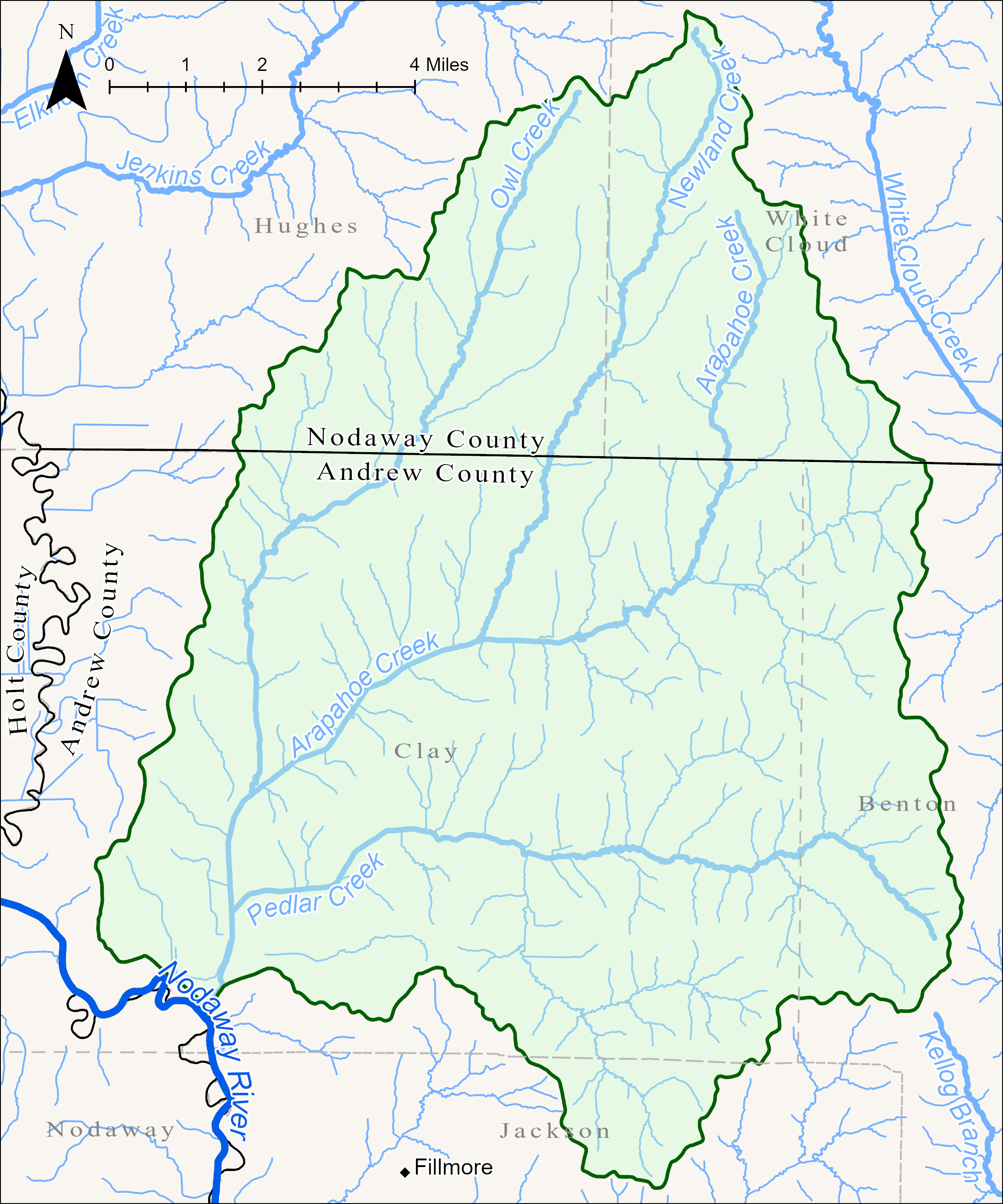
- Watershed map of Arapahoe Creek, Pedlar Creek in bottom center

Location
- Country: United States
- State: Missouri
- County: Andrew

Physical characteristics
- Source
  - location: Benton Township
  - coordinates: 40°03′17″N 94°52′25″W
  - elevation: 1,080 ft (330 m)
- Mouth: Arapahoe Creek
  - location: Clay Township
  - coordinates: 40°03′43″N 95°00′25″W
  - elevation: 833 ft (254 m)
- Length: 9.4 mi (15.1 km)

Basin features
- Progression: Pedlar Creek → Arapahoe Creek → Nodaway River → Missouri River → Mississippi River → Atlantic Ocean
- Stream gradient 19.2 ft/mi (3.64 m/km)

Pedlar Creek is a stream in northwestern Andrew County, Missouri. It is an indirect tributary to the Nodaway River via Arapahoe Creek and is 9.4 miles long.

Variant names include Peadlar and Peddler.

== Geography ==
Pedlar Creek is a left tributary of Arapahoe Creek and joins it 1.1 miles before its mouth in the Nodaway River.

=== Course ===
Pedlar Creek begins in north-central Andrew County about 3 miles west-northwest of Rosendale right alongside US 71. Smith Lake joins Pedlar Creek quite early on the stream's westerly progression. The stream flows in an undulating manner and among large bluffs on its southern side in the second half of its course. It confluences with Arapahoe Creek about 3 miles northwest of Fillmore.

=== Crossings ===
There is one highway that crosses Pedlar Creek at Route H in Andrew County.

== See also ==
- Tributaries of the Nodaway River
- List of rivers of Missouri
