= Arapaho Pass =

Arapaho Pass may refer to:

- Arapaho Pass (Front Range), a mountain pass on the Continental Divide of the Americas in the Front Range of Colorado, United States
- Arapaho Pass (Rabbit Ears Range), a mountain pass in the Rabbit Ears Range of Colorado, United States

== See also ==
- Arapaho (disambiguation)
- List of mountain passes
