= Holden, Missouri =

City in Johnson County, Missouri, United States

- City
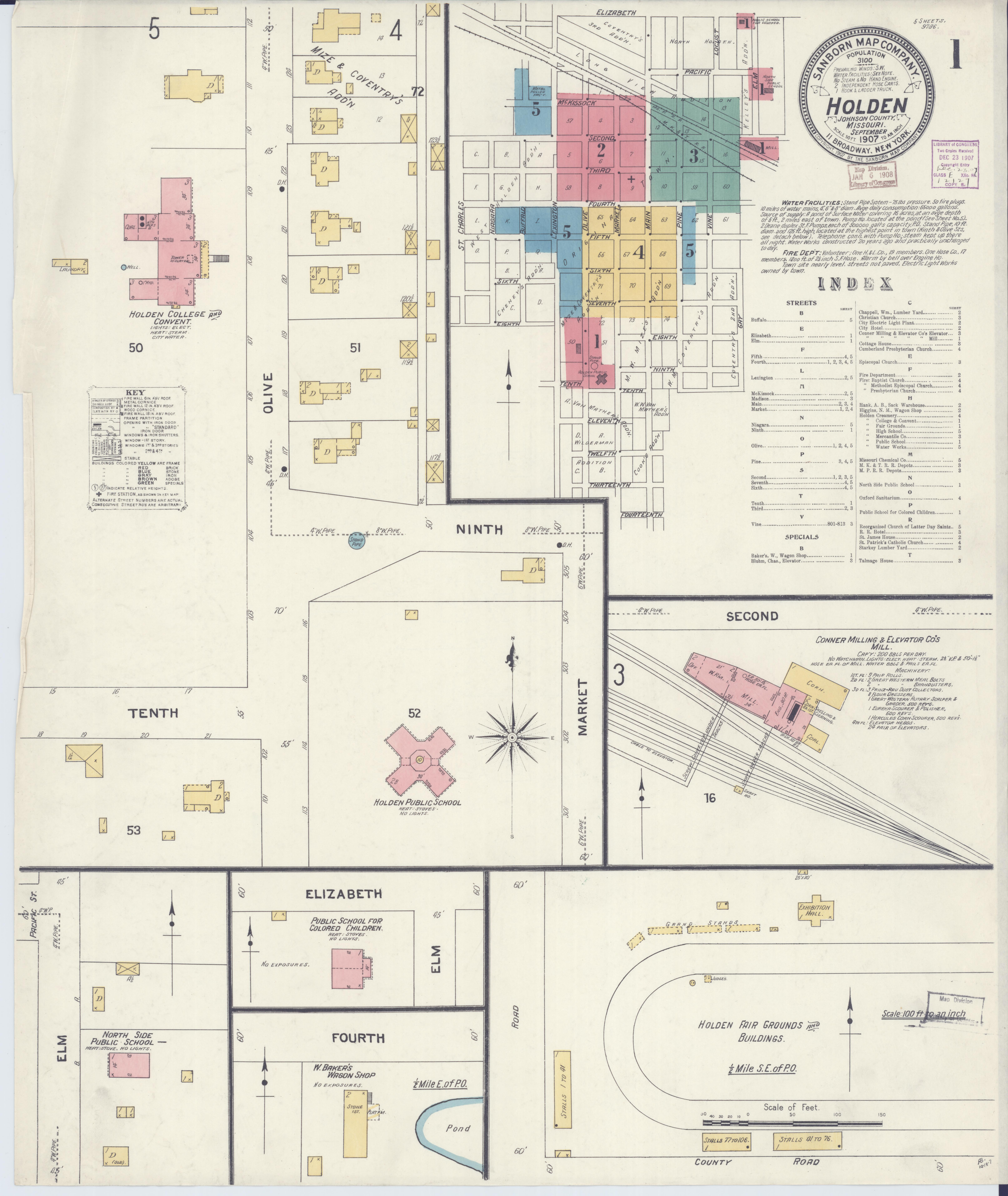
- 1908 map of Holden

- Location of Holden, Missouri
- Coordinates: 38°42′50″N 93°59′46″W
- Country: United States
- State: Missouri
- County: Johnson

Area
  - Total: 2.42 sq mi (6.26 km^{2})
  - Land: 2.41 sq mi (6.24 km^{2})
  - Water: 0.0077 sq mi (0.02 km^{2})
- Elevation: 873 ft (266 m)

Population (2020)
  - Total: 2,210
  - Density: 916.8/sq mi (353.98/km^{2})
- Time zone: UTC-6 (Central (CST))
  - Summer (DST): UTC-5 (CDT)
- ZIP code: 64040
- Area codes: 816, 975
- FIPS code: 29-32572
- GNIS feature ID: 2394398
- Website: holdenmo.gov

Holden is a city in western Johnson County, Missouri, United States. As of the 2020 census, Holden had a population of 2,210.

== History ==
Holden was laid out in 1857. It was named for Major Nathaniel Holden, a local politician who was instrumental in bringing the railroad to the area.

Anti-saloon advocate Carrie Nation lived in Holden in the 1870s, where she worked as a teacher.

== Geography ==
Holden is located at the intersection of Missouri routes 131 and 58. Warrensburg is approximately 13 miles to the east.

According to the United States Census Bureau, the city has a total area of 2.42 square miles (6.27 km^{2}), of which 2.41 square miles (6.24 km^{2}) is land and 0.01 square miles (0.03 km^{2}) is water.

East Pin Oak Creek, which merges with West Pin Oak Creek to form Pin Oak Creek to the north of the city, flows here.

== Demographics ==
Historical population
Census	Pop.	Note	%±
1860	59		—
1870	1,576		2,571.2%
1880	2,014		27.8%
1890	2,520		25.1%
1900	2,126		−15.6%
1910	2,007		−5.6%
1920	2,011		0.2%
1930	1,807		−10.1%
1940	1,818		0.6%
1950	1,765		−2.9%
1960	1,951		10.5%
1970	2,089		7.1%
1980	2,195		5.1%
1990	2,389		8.8%
2000	2,510		5.1%
2010	2,252		−10.3%
2020	2,210		−1.9%
U.S. Decennial Census

=== 2020 census ===
As of the 2020 census, Holden had a population of 2,210. The median age was 39.4 years. 25.7% of residents were under the age of 18 and 17.9% of residents were 65 years of age or older. For every 100 females there were 94.4 males, and for every 100 females age 18 and over there were 89.7 males age 18 and over.

0.0% of residents lived in urban areas, while 100.0% lived in rural areas.

There were 897 households in Holden, of which 32.3% had children under the age of 18 living in them. Of all households, 41.1% were married-couple households, 18.5% were households with a male householder and no spouse or partner present, and 30.5% were households with a female householder and no spouse or partner present. About 32.6% of all households were made up of individuals and 16.7% had someone living alone who was 65 years of age or older.

There were 1,045 housing units, of which 14.2% were vacant. The homeowner vacancy rate was 5.2% and the rental vacancy rate was 6.4%.

Racial composition as of the 2020 census
Race	Number	Percent
White	1,965	88.9%
Black or African American	28	1.3%
American Indian and Alaska Native	30	1.4%
Asian	2	0.1%
Native Hawaiian and Other Pacific Islander	4	0.2%
Some other race	4	0.2%
Two or more races	177	8.0%
Hispanic or Latino (of any race)	58	2.6%

=== 2010 census ===
As of the census of 2010, there were 2,252 people, 901 households, and 589 families living in the city. The population density was 934.4 inhabitants per square mile (360.8/km^{2}). There were 1,060 housing units at an average density of 439.8 per square mile (169.8/km^{2}). The racial makeup of the city was 94.6% White, 1.4% African American, 0.5% Native American, 0.1% Asian, 0.4% Pacific Islander, 0.8% from other races, and 2.3% from two or more races. Hispanic or Latino of any race were 2.5% of the population.

There were 901 households, of which 32.5% had children under the age of 18 living with them, 43.2% were married couples living together, 15.4% had a female householder with no husband present, 6.8% had a male householder with no wife present, and 34.6% were non-families. 29.4% of all households were made up of individuals, and 11.9% had someone living alone who was 65 years of age or older. The average household size was 2.44 and the average family size was 2.98.

The median age in the city was 37.7 years. 24.8% of residents were under the age of 18; 8.8% were between the ages of 18 and 24; 24.8% were from 25 to 44; 27.2% were from 45 to 64; and 14.3% were 65 years of age or older. The gender makeup of the city was 47.7% male and 52.3% female.

=== 2000 census ===
As of the census of 2000, there were 2,510 people, 990 households, and 656 families living in the city. The population density was 1,040.8 inhabitants per square mile (401.9/km^{2}). There were 1,089 housing units at an average density of 451.6 per square mile (174.4/km^{2}). The racial makeup of the city was 94.50% White, 1.91% African American, 1.08% Native American, 0.12% Asian, 0.04% Pacific Islander, 0.16% from other races, and 2.19% from two or more races. Hispanic or Latino of any race were 1.08% of the population.

There were 990 households, out of which 36.3% had children under the age of 18 living with them, 48.8% were married couples living together, 11.8% had a female householder with no husband present, and 33.7% were non-families. 29.3% of all households were made up of individuals, and 13.1% had someone living alone who was 65 years of age or older. The average household size was 2.53 and the average family size was 3.11.

In the city the population was spread out, with 30.0% under the age of 18, 11.0% from 18 to 24, 28.0% from 25 to 44, 17.3% from 45 to 64, and 13.8% who were 65 years of age or older. The median age was 33 years. For every 100 females there were 96.9 males. For every 100 females age 18 and over, there were 89.7 males.

The median income for a household in the city was $30,255, and the median income for a family was $35,234. Males had a median income of $26,285 versus $20,884 for females. The per capita income for the city was $13,537. About 10.0% of families and 12.5% of the population were below the poverty line, including 11.4% of those under age 18 and 23.9% of those age 65 or over.

== Education ==
The Holden R-III School District operates one elementary school, one middle school and the Holden High School.

Holden has a public library, a branch of the Trails Regional Library.

== Points of interest ==
The Holden City Lake, located in between Kingsville and Holden along SW 1501 County Road, managed and operated by the City of Holden is a 385-acre lake with 600 acres of recreational area. It is an important bird area in western Johnson County with over 225 bird species observed on the property. The lake also provides drinking water to the various surrounding communities.

The Joseph M. Miller Mausoleum is located just north of Holden. It is the only structure in Holden on the National Register of Historic Places.

Animal Wonders is a conservation organization based in Holden.

The Rock Island Spur of the Katy Trail State Park is located south of Holden near Medford.

== See also ==
- List of cities in Missouri
