= Missouri Route 58 =

State highway in Missouri, U.S.

Route 58

Route information
- Maintained by MoDOT
- Length: 50.041 mi (80.533 km)
- Existed: 1922–present

Major junctions
- West end: Route D west of Belton
- I-49 / US 71 in Belton; Route 291 east of Raymore; Route 7 in Pleasant Hill; Route 131 in Holden
- East end: US 50 west of Warrensburg

Location
- Country: United States
- State: Missouri

Highway system
- Missouri State Highway System; Interstate; US; State; Supplemental
| ← I-57 | → US 59 |

Route 58 is a highway in western Missouri. Its eastern terminus is at U.S. Route 50 west of Warrensburg; its western terminus is at Route D west of Belton, Missouri. It is one of only a very few highways to end at a state supplemental route.

Route 58 is one of the original 1922 state highways. Its eastern terminus was at Route 13 in Warrensburg, and its western terminus was at Route 1 (now Route 291) north of Harrisonville. In the 1950s, Route 58 had a spur connecting it with north US 71.

== Major intersections ==
| County | Location | mi | km | Destinations | Notes |
|---|---|---|---|---|---|
| Cass | Belton | 0.000 | 0.000 | Route D – Loch Lloyd, Kansas City, Cleveland | Western terminus; road continues as 171st Street |
| Cass | Belton | 4.480 | 7.210 | I-49 / US 71 – Harrisonville, Kansas City | I-49 exit 174 |
| Cass | Big Creek Township | 11.921 | 19.185 | Route 291 north – Lake Winnebago | Western end of Route 291 overlap |
| Cass | Big Creek Township | 13.439 | 21.628 | Route 291 south – Harrisonville | Eastern end of Route 291 overlap |
| Cass | Pleasant Hill | 19.124 | 30.777 | First Street north (Route 7 Bus. north) | Western end of Route 7 Bus. overlap |
| Cass | Pleasant Hill | 19.545– 19.793 | 31.455– 31.854 | Route 7 Bus. ends / Route 7 | Interchange via connector roads; eastern end of Route 7 Bus. overlap |
| Johnson | Holden | 35.935 | 57.832 | Route 131 north (Lexington Street) – Pittsville | Western end of Route 131 overlap |
| Johnson | Holden | 36.001 | 57.938 | Route 131 south (Olive Street) | Eastern end of Route 131 overlap |
| Johnson | Centerview | 47.102 | 75.803 | Centerview | Access via unsigned Route 58 Spur |
| Johnson | Centerview Township | 49.569– 50.041 | 79.774– 80.533 | US 50 – Warrensburg, Lee's Summit | Restricted crossing U-turn junction; eastern terminus |
1.000 mi = 1.609 km; 1.000 km = 0.621 mi: Concurrency terminus

== Related route ==
Route 58 Spur
- Location: Centerview
- Length: 0.257 mi (414 m)

Route 58 Spur is a 1/4-mile-long (400 m) road that extends from Route 58 west to Main Street in Centerview.
