= Owl Creek (Arapahoe Creek tributary) =

Stream in Missouri, U.S.

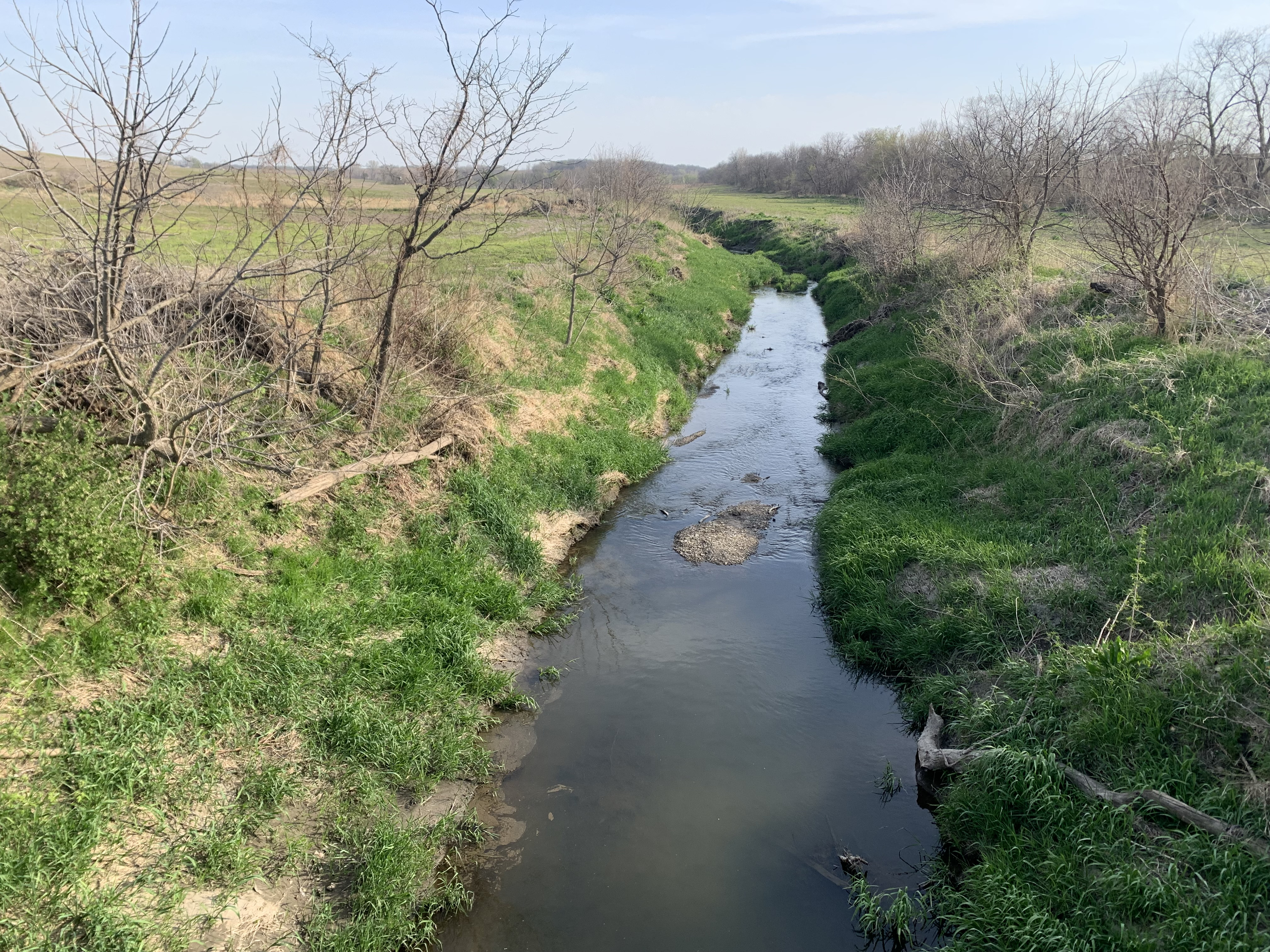
- Owl Creek on County Road 6 bridge in Clay Township, Andrew County

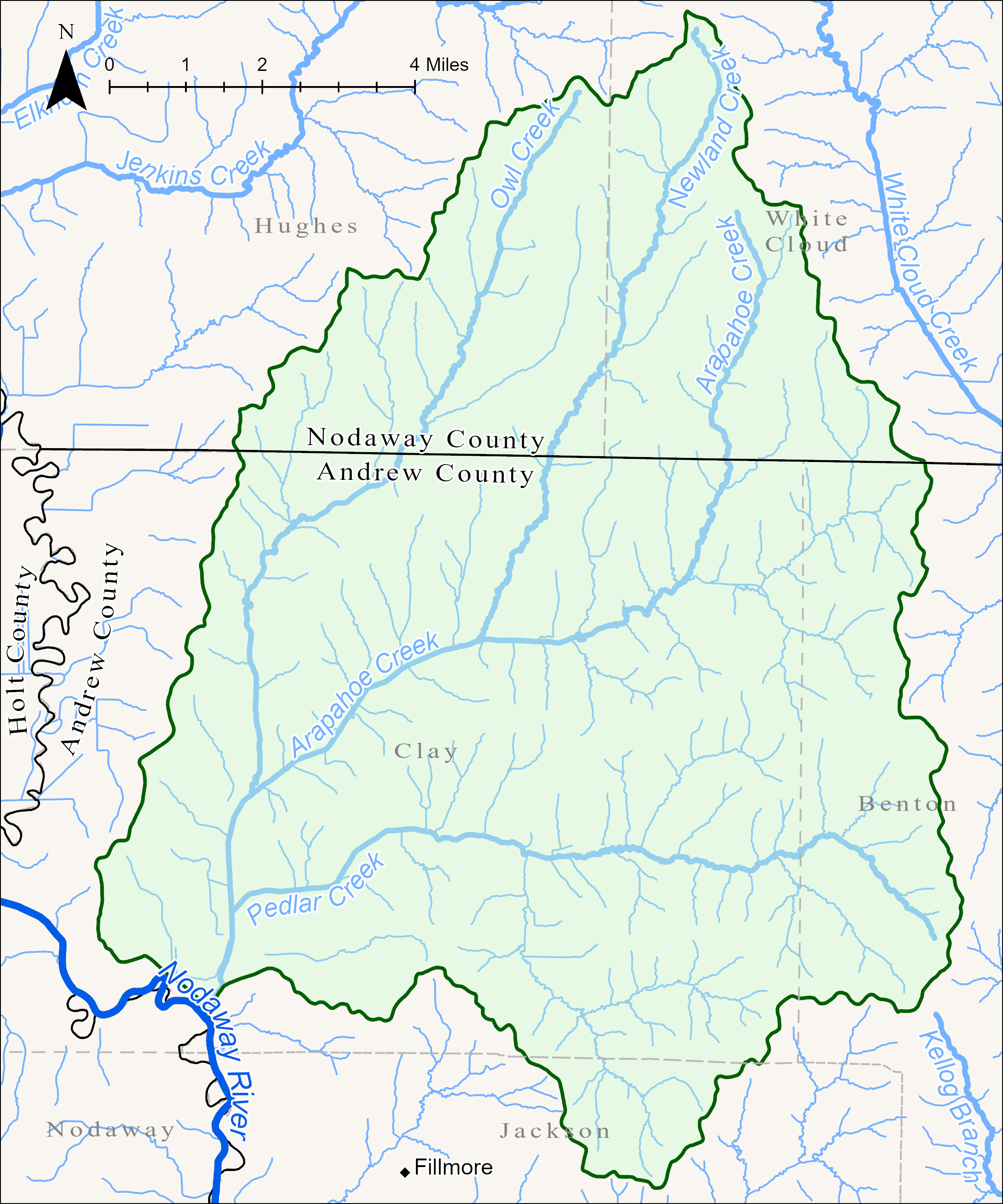
- Watershed map of Arapahoe Creek, Owl Creek in top left

Location
- Country: United States
- State: Missouri
- County: Andrew and Nodaway

Physical characteristics
- Source
  - location: Hughes Township
  - coordinates: 40°10′50″N 94°56′28″W
  - elevation: 1,050 ft (320 m)
- Mouth: Arapahoe Creek
  - location: Clay Township
  - coordinates: 40°04′54″N 95°00′05″W
  - elevation: 856 ft (261 m)
- Length: 9.5 mi (15.3 km)

Basin features
- Progression: Owl Creek → Arapahoe Creek → Nodaway River → Missouri River → Mississippi River → Atlantic Ocean

Owl Creek is a stream in Andrew and Nodaway counties of northwest Missouri. It is an indirect tributary to the Nodaway River via Arapahoe Creek and is 9.5 miles long.

== Geography ==
Owl Creek is a right tributary of Arapahoe Creek and joins it 2.4 miles before its mouth in the Nodaway River.

=== Course ===
Owl Creek arises in southwest Nodaway County about 5 miles east-southeast of Graham. The stream flows southwest about 3.5 miles to reach Andrew County and continues southwest another 2 miles before turning south. It passes Nodaway Valley Conservation Area to the east as it travels 2.5 miles south to its confluence with Arapahoe Creek.

=== Settlements ===
The hamlet of Parker was located on the west bank of this creek in northern Clay Township.

=== Crossings ===
Two highways cross Owl Creek: Route H in Nodaway County and Route Y in Andrew County.

== See also ==
- Tributaries of the Nodaway River
- List of rivers of Missouri
