= Newland Creek =

Stream in northwest Missouri, U.S.

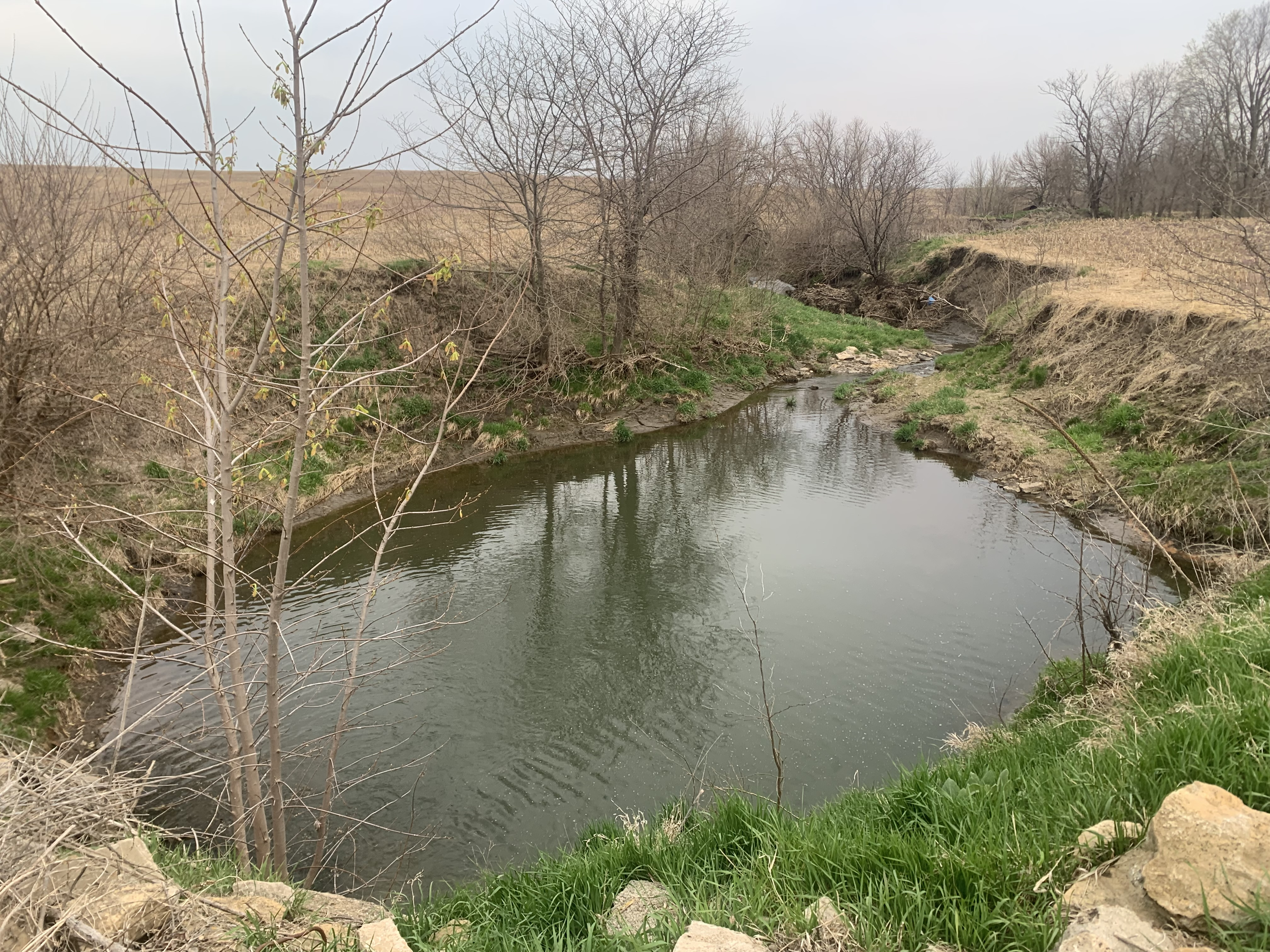
- Newland Creek on County Road 27 bridge in Clay Township, Andrew County

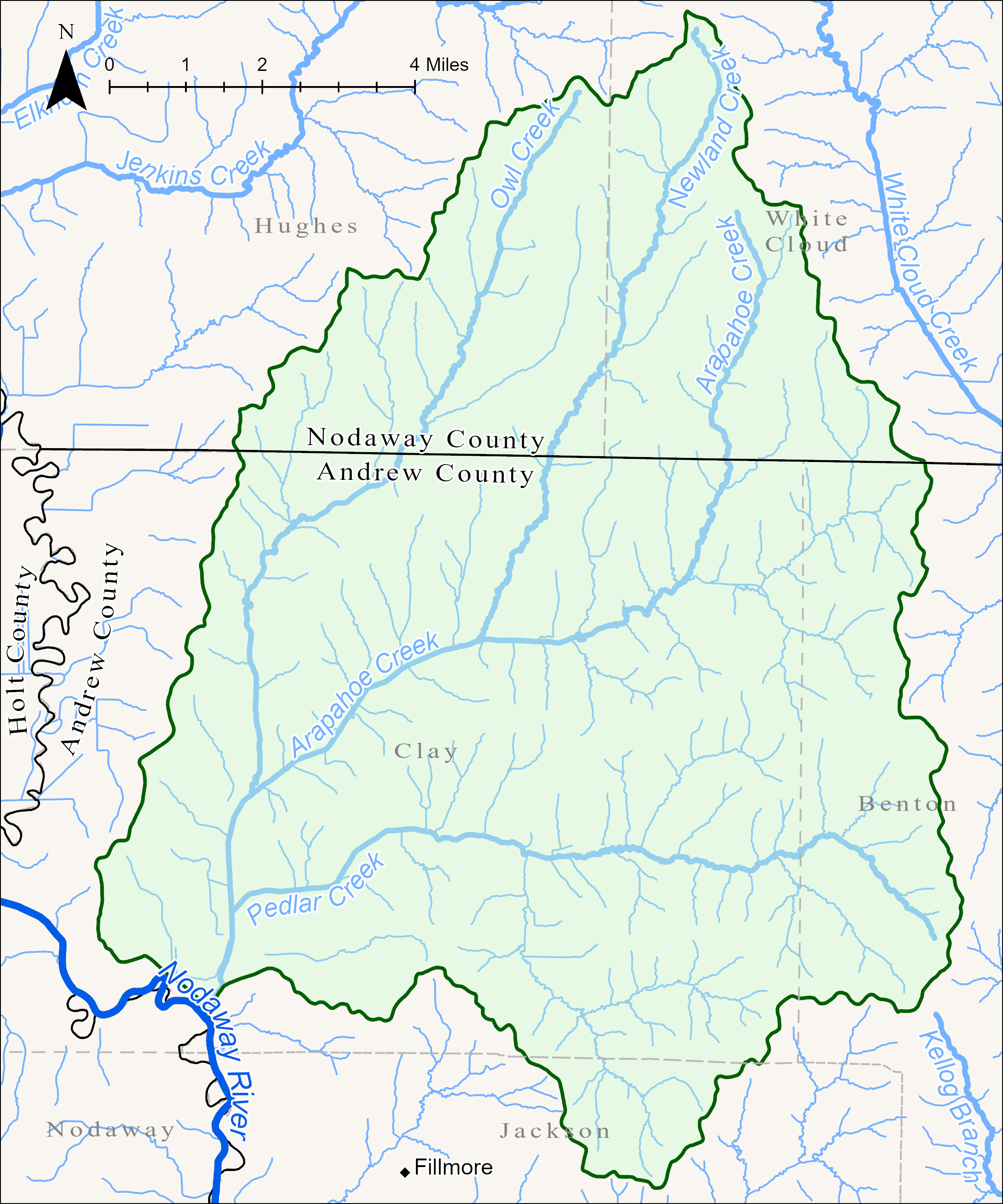
- Watershed map of Arapahoe Creek, Newland Creek in top center

Location
- Country: United States
- State: Missouri
- County: Andrew and Nodaway

Physical characteristics
- Source
  - location: White Cloud Township
  - coordinates: 40°11′28″N 94°55′07″W
  - elevation: 1,100 ft (340 m)
- Mouth: Arapahoe Creek
  - location: Clay Township
  - coordinates: 40°06′09″N 94°57′34″W
  - elevation: 863 ft (263 m)
- Length: 8.4 mi (13.5 km)

Basin features
- Progression: Newland Creek → Arapahoe Creek → Nodaway River → Missouri River → Mississippi River → Atlantic Ocean

Newland Creek is a stream in Andrew and Nodaway counties of northwest Missouri. It is an indirect tributary to the Nodaway River via Arapahoe Creek and is 8.4 miles long.

== Geography ==
Newland Creek is a right tributary of Arapahoe Creek and joins it 5.2 miles before its mouth in the Nodaway River. The Newland Creek headwaters are in southwest Nodaway County about 5 miles west-northwest of Barnard. The stream flows south-southwest in a fairly straight manner until it reaches Arapahoe Creek.

== See also ==
- Tributaries of the Nodaway River
- List of rivers of Missouri
