= Odessa, Missouri =

City in Lafayette County, Missouri, United States

- City
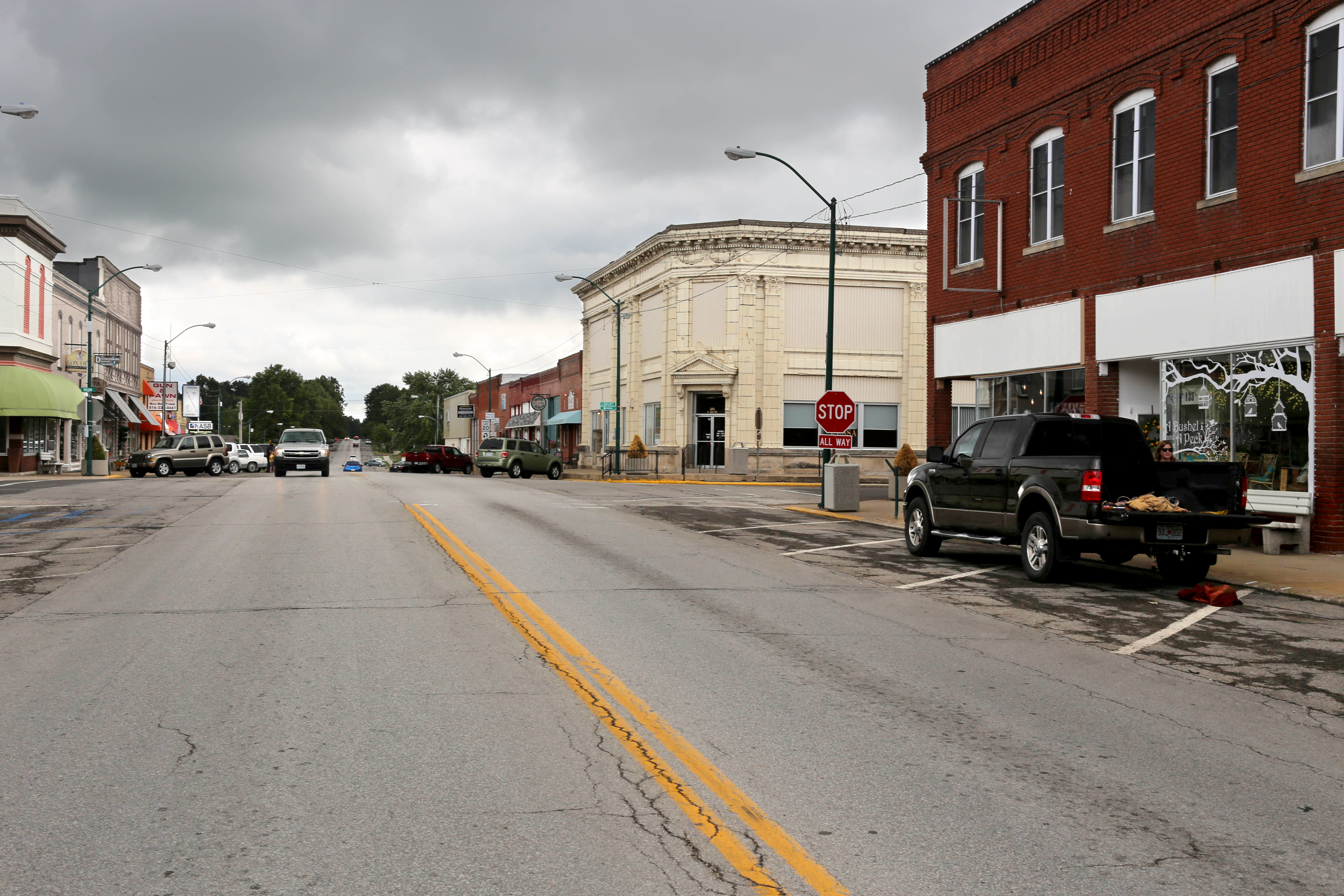
- Odessa, Missouri in 2018

- Location of Odessa, Missouri
- Coordinates: 38°59′56″N 93°58′00″W
- Country: United States
- State: Missouri
- County: Lafayette

Area
  - Total: 4.13 sq mi (10.69 km^{2})
  - Land: 4.10 sq mi (10.61 km^{2})
  - Water: 0.035 sq mi (0.09 km^{2})
- Elevation: 978 ft (298 m)

Population (2020)
  - Total: 5,593
  - Density: 1,365.4/sq mi (527.17/km^{2})
- Time zone: UTC-6 (Central (CST))
  - Summer (DST): UTC-5 (CDT)
- ZIP code: 64076
- Area code: 816
- FIPS code: 29-54038
- GNIS feature ID: 2395299
- Website: www.cityofodessamo.com

Odessa is the largest city in Lafayette County, Missouri, United States, and is part of the Kansas City metropolitan area. The population was 5,593 at the 2020 census. Located along Interstate 70 Odessa's historic downtown is home to a range of boutique shops and restaurants. The city is host to the annual Puddle Jumper Days town fair, the Odessa Rodeo, a Christmas lighting ceremony and various other community events held throughout the year.

== History ==
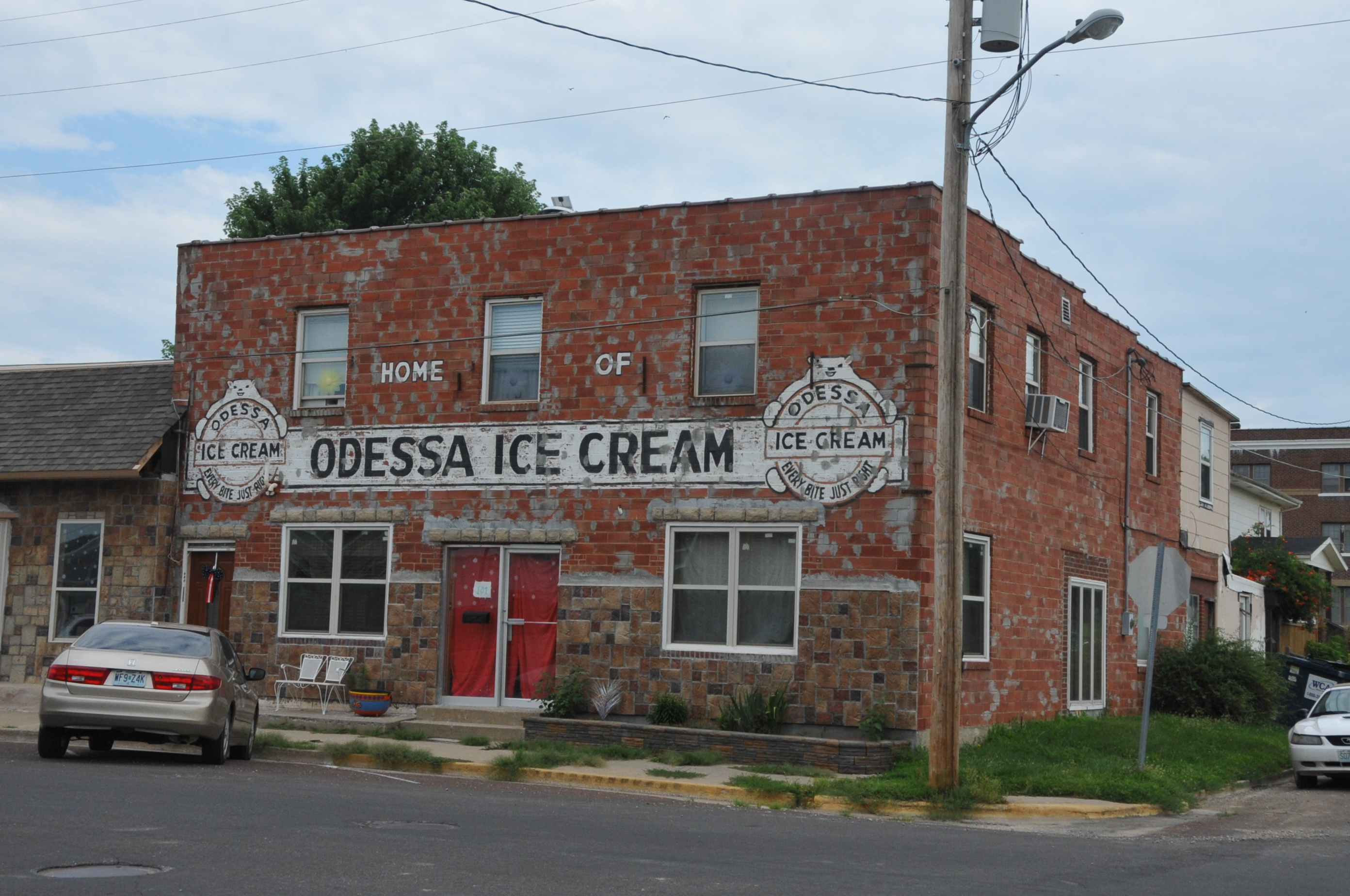
The Odessa Ice Cream Company Building was added to the registry of historic places.

Odessa was platted in 1878, and named after Odessa in the Russian Empire (present-day Ukraine). A post office called Odessa has been in operation since 1879.

In 1972, former President Harry Truman purchased his last car, a 1972 Chrysler Newport, from a dealership in Odessa.

The Odessa Ice Cream Company Building was listed on the National Register of Historic Places in 1996.

== Geography ==
According to the United States Census Bureau, the city has a total area of 4.13 square miles (10.70 km^{2}), of which 4.10 square miles (10.62 km^{2}) is land and 0.03 square miles (0.08 km^{2}) is water.

Odessa is located roughly 45 minutes from downtown Kansas City and approximately three hours from St. Louis.

== Demographics ==
Historical population
Census	Pop.	Note	%±
1880	100		—
1890	1,272		1,172.0%
1900	1,445		13.6%
1910	1,531		6.0%
1920	1,786		16.7%
1930	1,861		4.2%
1940	1,881		1.1%
1950	1,969		4.7%
1960	2,034		3.3%
1970	2,839		39.6%
1980	3,088		8.8%
1990	3,695		19.7%
2000	4,818		30.4%
2010	5,300		10.0%
2020	5,593		5.5%
U.S. Decennial Census

=== 2020 census ===
As of the 2020 census, Odessa had a population of 5,593. The median age was 35.6 years. 25.9% of residents were under the age of 18 and 15.8% of residents were 65 years of age or older. For every 100 females there were 93.8 males, and for every 100 females age 18 and over there were 90.2 males age 18 and over.

98.8% of residents lived in urban areas, while 1.2% lived in rural areas.

There were 2,195 households in Odessa, of which 34.6% had children under the age of 18 living in them. Of all households, 44.8% were married-couple households, 18.2% were households with a male householder and no spouse or partner present, and 28.1% were households with a female householder and no spouse or partner present. About 27.4% of all households were made up of individuals and 12.2% had someone living alone who was 65 years of age or older.

There were 2,321 housing units, of which 5.4% were vacant. The homeowner vacancy rate was 1.0% and the rental vacancy rate was 5.4%.

Racial composition as of the 2020 census
Race	Number	Percent
White	5,089	91.0%
Black or African American	62	1.1%
American Indian and Alaska Native	43	0.8%
Asian	23	0.4%
Native Hawaiian and Other Pacific Islander	4	0.1%
Some other race	28	0.5%
Two or more races	344	6.2%
Hispanic or Latino (of any race)	178	3.2%

=== 2010 census ===
As of the 2010 census, there were 5,300 people, 2,077 households, and 1,427 families living in the city. The population density was 1,292.7 inhabitants per square mile (499.1/km^{2}). There were 2,280 housing units at an average density of 556.1 units per square mile (214.7 units/km^{2}). The racial makeup of the city was 94.8% White, 1.4% African American, 0.4% Native American, 0.4% Asian, 0.3% from other races, and 2.6% from two or more races. Hispanic or Latino of any race were 2.2% of the population.

There were 2,077 households, of which 37.1% had children under the age of 18 living with them, 49.1% were married couples living together, 14.3% had a female householder with no husband present, 5.3% had a male householder with no wife present, and 31.3% were non-families. 26.1% of all households were made up of individuals, and 11.2% had someone living alone who was 65 years of age or older. The average household size was 2.52 and the average family size was 3.00.

The median age in the city was 35.2 years. 27% of residents were under the age of 18; 8.8% were between the ages of 18 and 24; 26.6% were from 25 to 44; 22.8% were from 45 to 64; and 14.8% were 65 years of age or older. The gender makeup of the city was 48.2% male and 51.8% female.

=== 2000 census ===
As of the 2000 census, there were 4,818 people, 1,887 households, and 1,290 families living in the city. The population density was 1,381.7 inhabitants per square mile (533.5/km^{2}). There were 2,011 housing units at an average density of 576.7 units per square mile (222.7 units/km^{2}). The racial makeup of the city was 97.09% White, 1.18% African American, 0.27% Native American, 0.10% Asian, 0.04% Pacific Islander, 0.33% from other races, and 0.98% from two or more races. Hispanic or Latino of any race were 0.73% of the population.

There were 1,887 households, out of which 36.5% had children under the age of 18 living with them, 53.8% were married couples living together, 10.9% had a female householder with no husband present, and 31.6% were non-families. 26.7% of all households were made up of individuals, and 11.7% had someone living alone who was 65 years of age or older. The average household size was 2.52 and the average family size was 3.07.

In the city the population was spread out, with 28.2% under the age of 18, 9.0% from 18 to 24, 30.9% from 25 to 44, 17.4% from 45 to 64, and 14.4% who were 65 years of age or older. The median age was 34 years. For every 100 females, there were 93.8 males. For every 100 females age 18 and over, there were 89.4 males.

The median income for a household in the city was $34,007, and the median income for a family was $40,000. Males had a median income of $35,476 versus $23,047 for females. The per capita income for the city was $17,455. About 8.4% of families and 9.9% of the population were below the poverty line, including 10.0% of those under age 18 and 14.9% of those age 65 or over.

== Education ==
Odessa R-7 School District, which covers the municipality, operates two elementary schools, one middle school and Odessa High School.

Odessa has a public library, a branch of the Trails Regional Library.

Metropolitan Community College has the Odessa school district area in its service area, but not its in-district taxation area.

== Sports ==
I-70 Motorsports Park I-70 Motorsports Park, formally known as I-70 Speedway, is a multi-purpose motorsports facility near Interstate 70 east of Odessa, Missouri, USA. The track first opened in 1969 and operated yearly until its closure in 2008. After more than a decade of abandonment, the park reopened in April 2021 under new ownership, featuring a resurfaced 3/8-mile dirt oval and a newly constructed 1/4-mile dragstrip.

The Odessa R-VII Bulldog Football Team was the 1994 and 2019 Missouri State High School Athletic Association Class 3 State Champions.

== Parks and recreation ==
Dyer Park is one of the oldest parks in Odessa and is the most developed and heavily used parks in the city. Facilities include a community building, swimming pool, pavilion, picnic shelter, outdoor basketball and tennis courts, baseball and softball fields, a rodeo arena, and two playground areas.

Lake Venita, located in Dyer Park, offers outstanding fishing, dock and a half mile paved walking trail.

The 90-acre Odessa City Lake southwest of Odessa offers fishing and waterfowl hunting. It is managed under a cooperative agreement between the Missouri Department of Conservation and the City of Odessa. The site includes a privy, boat ramp and dock, a pavilion and picnic areas.

== Government ==
The City of Odessa is governed by a mayor and six-member board of aldermen. The current mayor is Bryan Barner.

The city is divided into three wards. Two aldermen are elected in each ward, with terms alternating so that one alderman in each ward is elected each year in April. The mayor is elected in even years and serves a 2-year term. Odessa is incorporated as a fourth-class municipality.

== Media ==
Odessa has been served by a newspaper since 1880. In 1942, the Odessa Democrat merged with The Ledger creating The Odessan.

As Lafayette County's largest newspaper, The Odessan is published weekly providing local coverage of news and sports in the communities of Odessa, Bates City, Mayview, Wellington, Napoleon and Lafayette County. The newspaper is an independent, fourth-generation, family-owned publication.

== Notable people ==
- Brenna Dowell, gymnast who was a world champion in 2015
- Tonya Evinger, mixed martial artist; born in Odessa on June 4, 1981
- Jim Fitterling, chairman and CEO and of Dow, Inc., graduated Odessa High School in 1979
- Terin Humphrey, medal-winning Olympic gymnast; graduate of Odessa High School
- James Krause, professional mixed martial artist
- Norris Patterson, head football coach at William Jewell College from 1950 to 1967
- H. Owen Reed, composer; born in Odessa on June 17, 1910
- Joe C. Specker, Army sergeant and (posthumous) Medal of Honor recipient in World War II
- Brad Ziegler, Major League Baseball pitcher, attended Odessa High School

== See also ==
- List of cities in Missouri
