= Joseph M. Miller Mausoleum =

Historic mausoleum in Missouri, US

- U.S. National Register of Historic Places
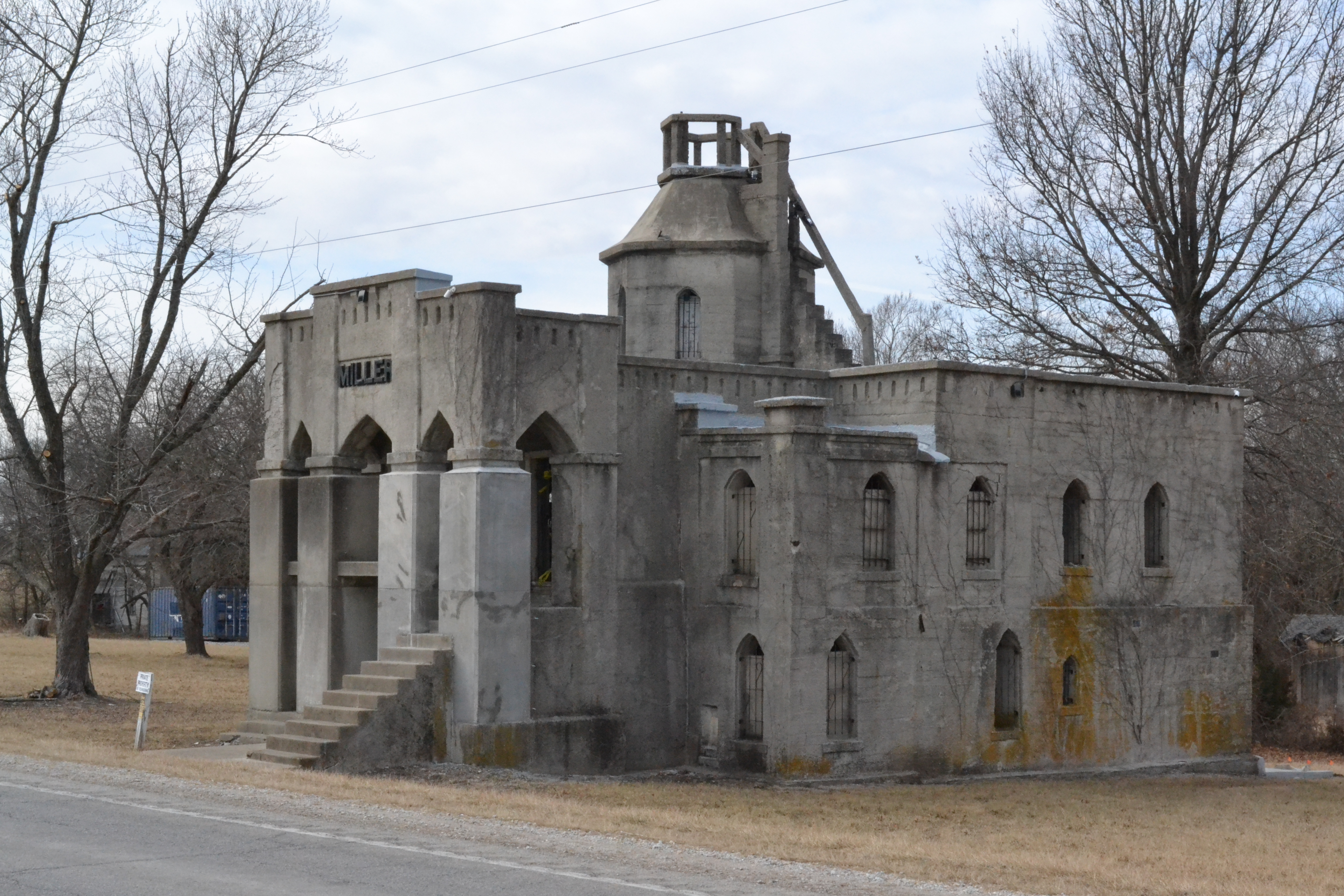
- The Joseph M. Miller Mausoleum in 2018

- Location within Missouri
- Coordinates: 38°43′49″N 93°59′34″W
- NRHP reference No.: 100002036
- Added to NRHP: January 29, 2018

The Joseph M. Miller Mausoleum is a historic mausoleum in Holden, Missouri.

== History ==
After biblical scholar Joseph M. Miller moved to Holden in 1915 from Macon, he ordered the construction of the Joseph M. Miller Mausoleum. It was finished in by 1927, and some fifteen to twenty of Miller's relatives have been buried inside between its completion and 1931. In 2010, descendant Carl Cranfill moved to Holden to maintain it.

It was added to the National Register of Historic Places on January 29, 2018.

In 2022, it was reported as haunted.
