= Odessa Ice Cream Company Building =

- U.S. National Register of Historic Places
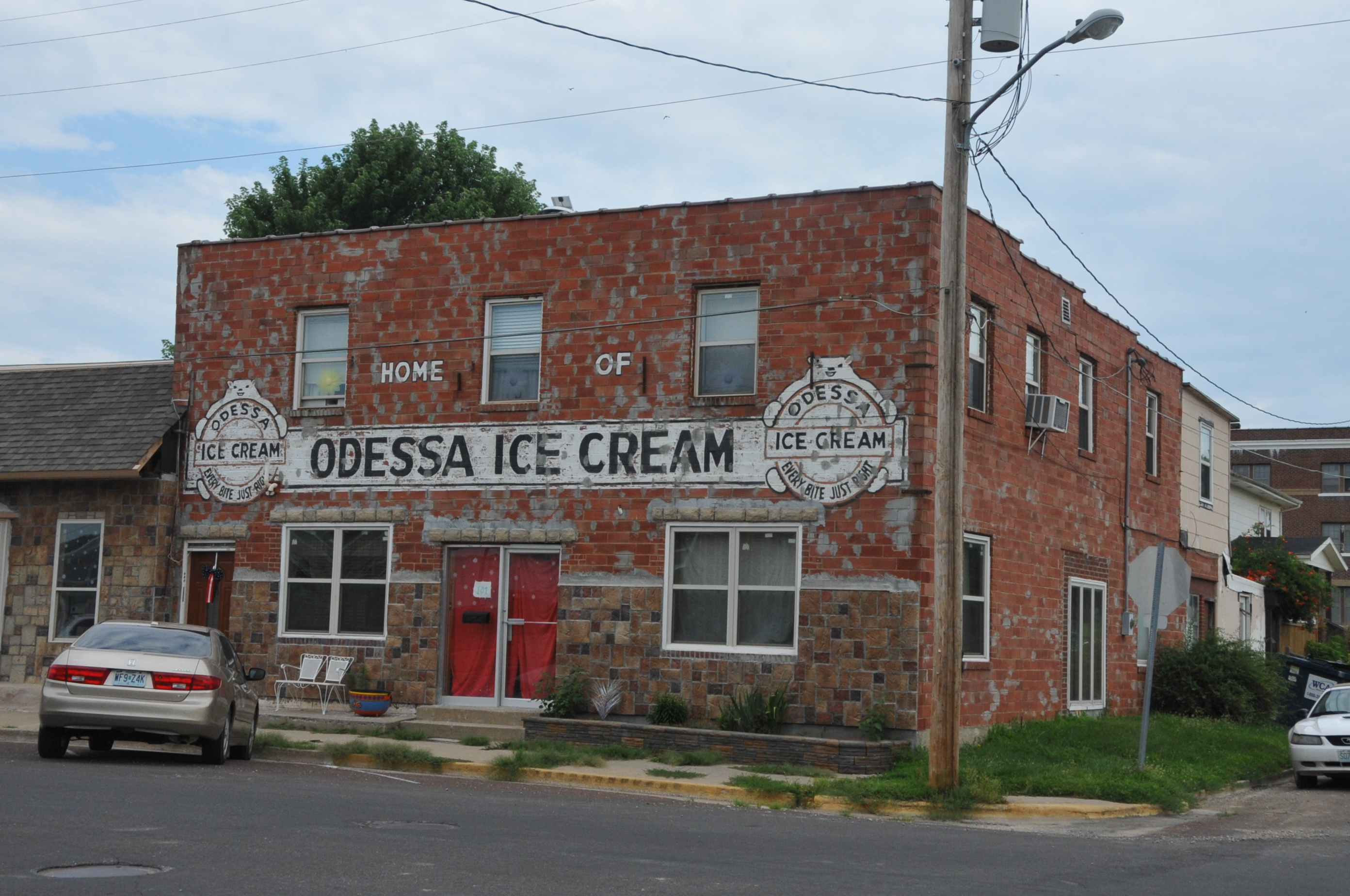
- Odessa Ice Cream Company Building, July 2013

- Location within Missouri Location within the United States
- Location: 101 W. Dryden St., Odessa, Missouri
- Coordinates: 38°59′36″N 93°57′15″W
- Area: less than one acre
- NRHP reference No.: 96001065
- Added to NRHP: October 3, 1996

Odessa Ice Cream Company Building is a historic commercial building and ice cream factory located in Odessa, Lafayette County, Missouri. It was built in 1929, and is a two-story, three bay by five bay, clay block and brick building. The rear section was raised to two stories about in 1946. Odessa Ice Cream was the official ice cream at the Missouri State Fair in the 1930s.

It was listed on the National Register of Historic Places in 1996.
