= Arapaho (disambiguation) =

The Arapaho are a tribe of Native Americans who originally lived in what is now eastern Colorado and Wyoming.

Arapaho or Arapahoe may also refer to:

- Arapahoe Tribe of the Wind River Reservation, federally recognized tribe of Northern Arapaho in Wyoming
- Cheyenne and Arapaho Tribes, federally recognized tribe of Southern Arapaho in Oklahoma
- Arapaho language

== Places ==
- Arapahoe at Village Center (RTD), a transit station in Greenwood Village, Colorado
- Arapahoe Basin, a ski area in Colorado
- Arapaho Center station (Dallas Area Rapid Transit), a transit station in Richardson, Texas
- Arapahoe, Colorado, an unincorporated town
- Arapahoe County, Colorado
- Arapahoe Creek, a tributary of the Nodaway River in northwestern Missouri
- Arapahoe, Nebraska, a small city
- Arapahoe, North Carolina, a small town on the eastern coast of North Carolina on the Neuse River
- Arapaho, Oklahoma, county seat of Custer County, Oklahoma
- Arapahoe, Wyoming, a town on the Wind River Indian Reservation, home to the Northern Arapahoe Tribe

== Transportation ==
- USS Arapahoe (1864), a sloop-of-war or frigate which was never constructed, being canceled in 1866
- USS Arapaho (AT-14), a tugboat launched on 20 June 1914
- USS Arapaho (ATF-68), a tugboat laid down on 8 November 1941 at Charleston, South Carolina
- Piper PA-40 Arapaho, a replacement for the Piper PA-39 Twin-Comanche C/R. Only three built, project cancelled
- Bell ARH-70 Arapaho, a light military helicopter designed for the United States Army's Armed Reconnaissance Helicopter (ARH) program.

== Other ==
- The "Arapaho" project, referring to the PCI Express computer expansion card interface format

== See also ==
- Arapaha, a Timucua town in Spanish Florida
