= Joe C. Specker =

United States Army Medal of Honor recipient

- Born: January 10, 1921; Odessa, Missouri, US
- Died: January 7, 1944 (aged 22); Mount Porchio, Italy
- Burial place: Odessa Cemetery, Odessa, Missouri
- Military career
- Allegiance: United States of America
- Branch: United States Army
- Service years: 1942 - 1944
- Rank: Sergeant
- Unit: 48th Engineer Combat Battalion
- Conflicts: World War II
- Awards: Medal of Honor

Joe C. Specker (January 10, 1921 – January 7, 1944) was a United States Army soldier and a recipient of the United States military's highest decoration—the Medal of Honor—for his actions in World War II.

Specker joined the Army from his birth city of Odessa, Missouri in September 1942, and by January 7, 1944, was serving as a Sergeant in the 48th Engineer Combat Battalion. On that day, at Mount Porchio, Italy, he voluntarily went forward alone to destroy an enemy machine gun emplacement. Although severely wounded during his advance, he continued on and routed the enemy force before succumbing to his wounds. He was posthumously awarded the Medal of Honor six months later, on July 12, 1944.

Specker, aged 22 at his death, was buried at Odessa Cemetery in his hometown of Odessa, Missouri.

== Medal of Honor citation ==
Sergeant Specker's official Medal of Honor citation reads:

For conspicuous gallantry and intrepidity at risk of life, above and beyond the call of duty, in action involving actual conflict. On the night of 7 January 1944, Sgt. Specker, with his company, was advancing up the slope of Mount Porchio, Italy. He was sent forward on reconnaissance and on his return he reported to his company commander the fact that there was an enemy machinegun nest and several well-placed snipers directly in the path and awaiting the company. Sgt. Specker requested and was granted permission to place 1 of his machineguns in a position near the enemy machinegun. Voluntarily and alone he made his way up the mountain with a machinegun and a box of ammunition. He was observed by the enemy as he walked along and was severely wounded by the deadly fire directed at him. Though so seriously wounded that he was unable to walk, he continued to drag himself over the jagged edges of rock and rough terrain until he reached the position at which he desired to set up his machinegun. He set up the gun so well and fired so accurately that the enemy machine-gun nest was silenced and the remainder of the snipers forced to retire, enabling his platoon to obtain their objective. Sgt. Specker was found dead at his gun. His personal bravery, self-sacrifice, and determination were an inspiration to his officers and fellow soldiers.

== See also ==
- List of Medal of Honor recipients
