= Arapahoe Creek =

Stream in Missouri, U.S.

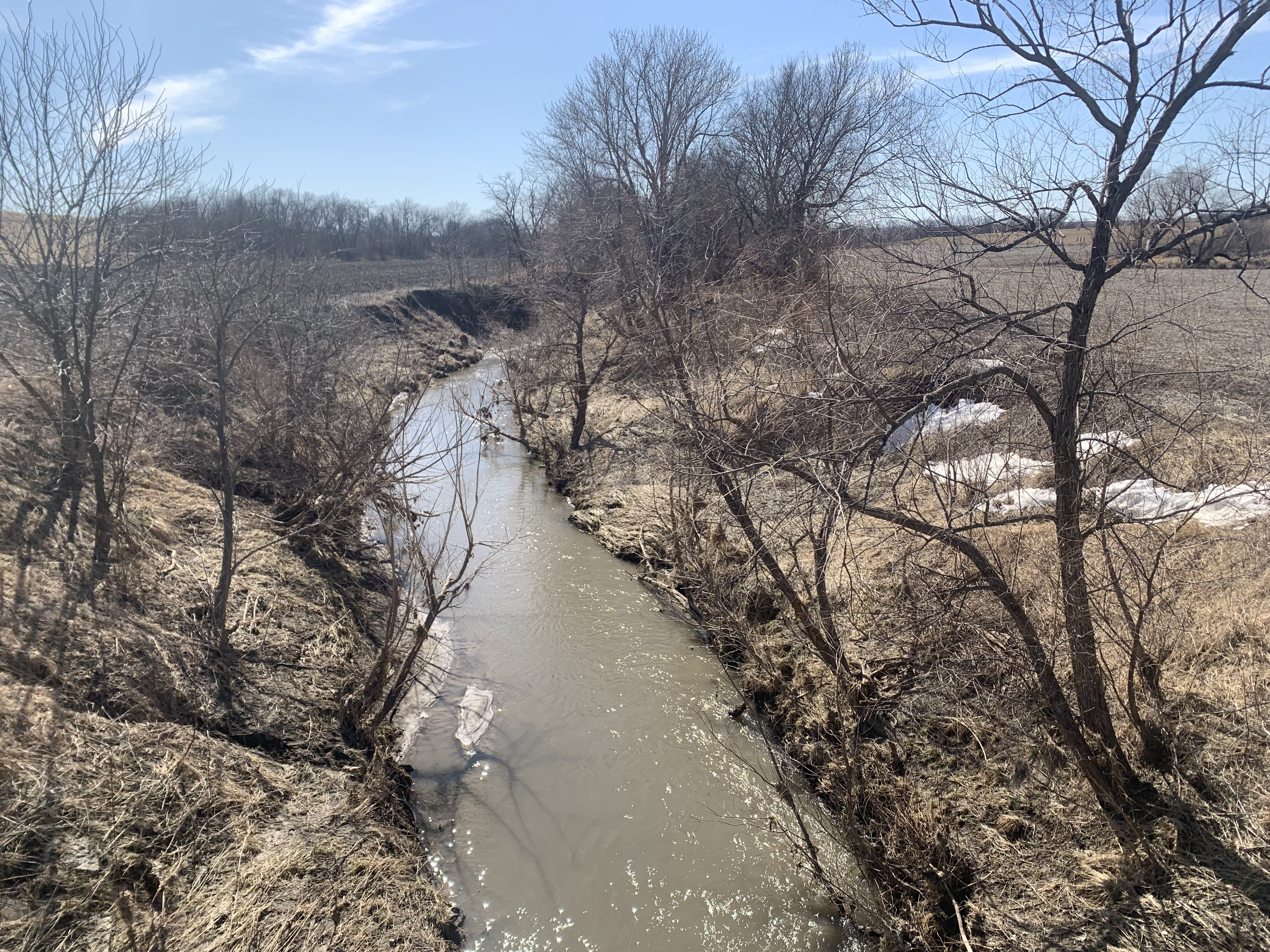
- Arapahoe Creek on Route H bridge in Clay Township, Andrew County

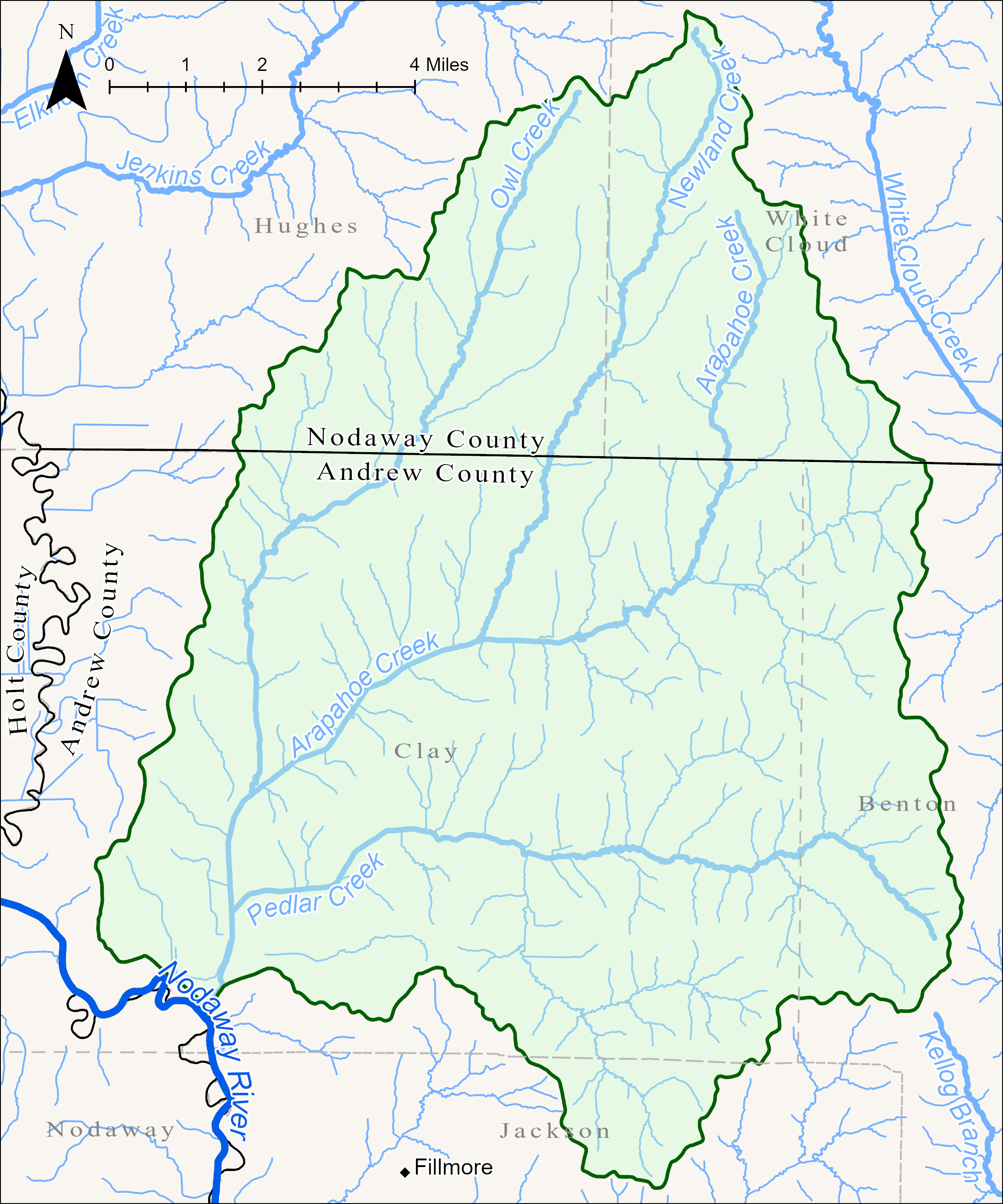
- Watershed map of Arapahoe Creek

Location
- Country: United States
- State: Missouri
- County: Andrew and Nodaway

Physical characteristics
- Source
  - location: White Cloud Township
  - coordinates: 40°10′10″N 94°54′38″W
  - elevation: 1,090 ft (330 m)
- Mouth: Nodaway River
  - location: Clay Township
  - coordinates: 40°2′51″N 95°00′40″W
  - elevation: 833 ft (254 m)
- Length: 12.6 mi (20.3 km)
- Basin size: 60.89 sq mi (157.7 km^{2})

Basin features
- Progression: Arapahoe Creek → Nodaway River → Missouri River → Mississippi River → Atlantic Ocean
- Stream gradient 16.9 ft/mi (3.20 m/km)

Arapahoe Creek is a stream in Andrew and Nodaway counties of northwest Missouri. It is a tributary to the Nodaway River and is 12.6 miles long.

== Etymology ==
Arapahoe Creek was named after the Arapaho Native Americans. A older, variant name was Whitelands Creek. A variant spelling was Arrappahoe.

== Geography ==
Arapahoe Creek is a left tributary of the Nodaway River and joins it 14.4 miles before its mouth in the Missouri River. It is the first major tributary of the Nodaway River in Andrew County. There are no communities in the Arapahoe Creek watershed, but there are two named lakes Dysart Lake and Smith Lake.

=== Course ===
The stream headwaters arise in southwest Nodaway County about 4.5 miles southwest of the community of Barnard and west of US 71. The stream flows south into Andrew County and flows southwest to its confluence with the Nodaway River about 2.5 miles northwest of the community of Fillmore. Holt County lies on the west side of the Nodaway River at the confluence.

=== Tributaries ===
The stream has three named tributaries: Pedlar Creek, Newland Creek, and Owl Creek, all of which join the Arapahoe Creek in Andrew County.

=== Crossings ===
There is one highway that crosses Arapahoe Creek at Route H in Andrew County.

== See also ==
- Tributaries of the Nodaway River
- List of rivers of Missouri
