= Specker See =

Lake in Mecklenburg-Vorpommern, Germany

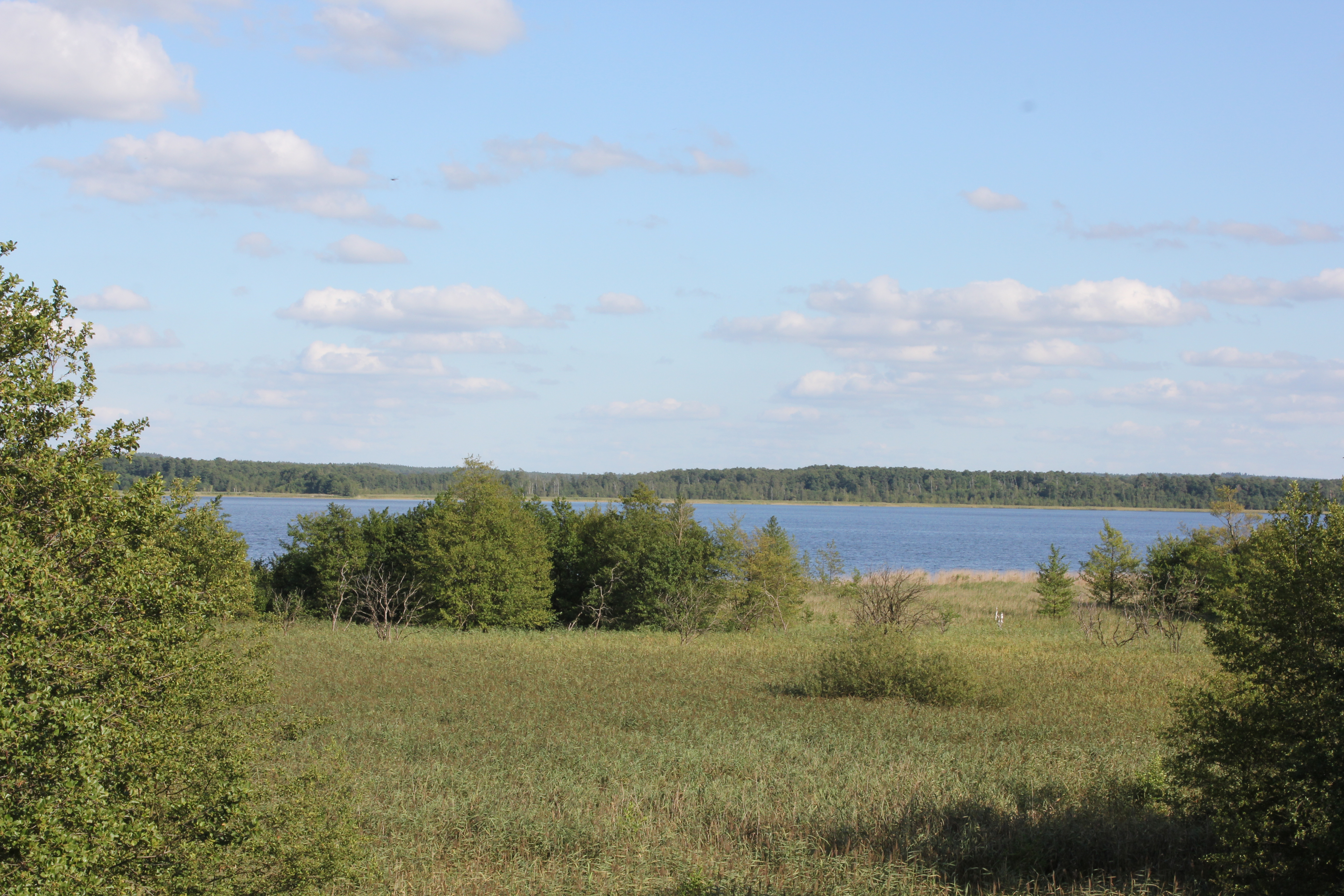

- Location within Mecklenburg-Vorpommern
- Location: Mecklenburgische Seenplatte, Mecklenburg-Vorpommern, Germany
- Coordinates: 53.438787°N 12.807312°E
- Primary outflows: Hermannsgraben
- Basin countries: Germany
- Surface area: 2.58 km^{2} (1.00 sq mi)
- Surface elevation: 62.4 m (205 ft)

Specker See is a lake in the Mecklenburgische Seenplatte district in Mecklenburg-Vorpommern, Germany. It has an elevation is 62.4 m (205 ft) and covers a surface area of 2.58 km^{2} (1.00 sq mi).
