= Pin Oak Creek =

Stream in the American state of Missouri

Coordinates: 38.765566°N 93.975497°W

Pin Oak Creek is a stream in Johnson County in the U.S. state of Missouri. It is a tributary of Blackwater River.

Pin Oak Creek was named for the pin oak trees lining its course.

== See also ==
- List of rivers of Missouri
