= Clay Township, Greene County, Missouri =

Township in Greene County, Missouri

Coordinates: 37.1178283°N 93.2515742°W

Clay Township is an inactive township in Greene County, in the U.S. state of Missouri.

Clay Township was named after Henry Clay.
