= Clay Township, Dunklin County, Missouri =

Extinct town in the U.S. state of Missouri

Coordinates: 36.0679755°N 90.0636774°W

Clay Township is a township in Dunklin County, in the U.S. state of Missouri.

Clay Township most likely has the name of statesman Henry Clay.
