= Clay Township, Ralls County, Missouri =

Inactive township in the American state of Missouri

Coordinates: 39.6344°N 91.4828°W

Clay Township is an inactive township in Ralls County, in the U.S. state of Missouri.

Clay Township has the name of Kentucky statesman Henry Clay.
