= Clay Township, Linn County, Missouri =

Township in Linn County, Missouri, U.S.

Coordinates: 39°52′24″N 93°17′46″W

Clay Township is a township in Linn County, in the U.S. state of Missouri.

Clay Township was established in 1869, and most likely was named after Henry Clay, a Kentucky statesman.
