= Clay Township, Shelby County, Missouri =

Township in Shelby County, Missouri, U.S.

Coordinates: 39.8031°N 92.2400°W

Clay Township is an inactive township in Shelby County, in the U.S. state of Missouri.

Clay Township was erected in the 1845, taking its name from Kentucky speaker Henry Clay.
