= Clay Township, Saline County, Missouri =

Township in Saline County, Missouri, U.S.

Coordinates: 39.1683°N 93.0100°W

Clay Township is an inactive township in Saline County, in the U.S. state of Missouri.

Clay Township was erected in 1837, taking its name from Kentucky statesman Henry Clay.
