= Clay Township, Douglas County, Missouri =

Township in Missouri, U.S.

Coordinates: 37°01′09″N 92°28′10″W

Clay Township is a township in northern Douglas County, in the U.S. state of Missouri.
