= Clay Township, Sullivan County, Missouri =

Township in the American state of Missouri

Coordinates: 40.3386°N 93.2875°W

Clay Township is a township in Sullivan County, in the U.S. state of Missouri.

Clay Township was erected in 1860.
