= Clay Township, Clark County, Missouri =

Township in Clark County, Missouri, U.S.

Coordinates: 40.3147828°N 91.5514703°W

Clay Township is an inactive township in Clark County, in the U.S. state of Missouri.

Clay Township was established in 1868, taking its name from Henry Clay, the Kentucky statesman.
