= Pittsville, Missouri =

Unincorporated community in Missouri, U.S.

Coordinates: 38°51′02″N 93°59′25″W

Pittsville is an unincorporated community in Jackson Township, Johnson County, in the U.S. state of Missouri.

== History ==
Pittsville was platted in 1858, and named after Warren M. Pitts, a local minister. A post office called Pittsville was established in 1860, and remained in operation until 1954.
