= Clay Township, Gasconade County, Missouri =

Inactive township in the American state of Missouri

Coordinates: 38.2954426°N 91.5816043°W

Clay Township is an inactive township in Gasconade County, in the U.S. state of Missouri.

Clay Township has the name of Henry Clay, a politician from Kentucky.
