= Clay Township, Monroe County, Missouri =

Township in Monroe County, Missouri, U.S.

Coordinates: 39.5897°N 92.0833°W

Clay Township is an inactive township in Monroe County, in the U.S. state of Missouri.

Clay Township was established in 1860, and named after Charles S. Clay, a pioneer citizen.
