= Clay Township, Andrew County, Missouri =

Township in Andrew County, Missouri, U.S.

Clay Township
- Township
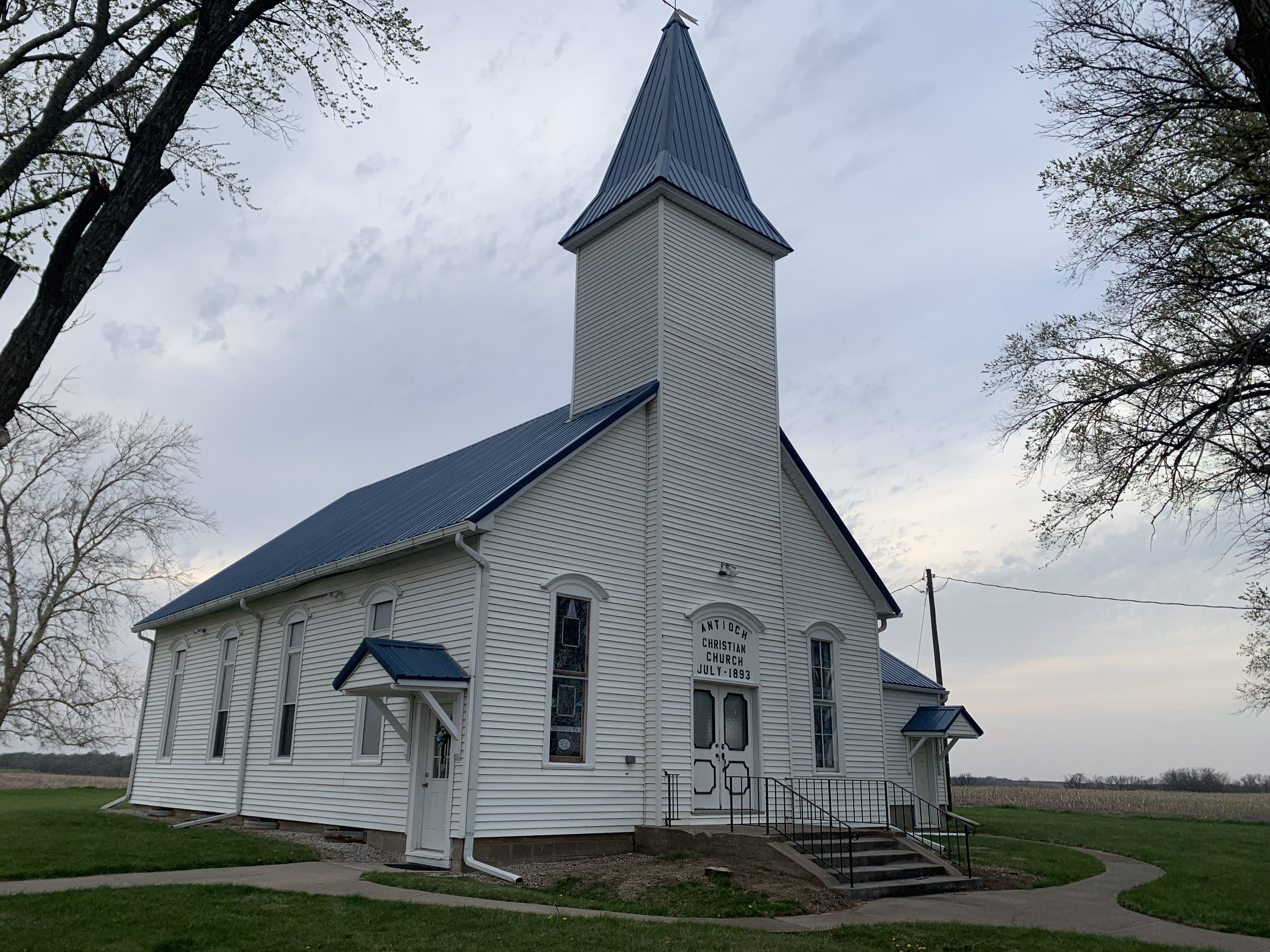
- Antioch Christian Church in Clay Township

- Coordinates: 40°05′30″N 94°58′01″W
- Country: United States
- State: Missouri
- County: Andrew

Area
  - Total: 45.33 sq mi (117.4 km^{2})
  - Land: 45.27 sq mi (117.2 km^{2})
  - Water: 0.06 sq mi (0.16 km^{2}) 0.13%
- Elevation: 938 ft (286 m)

Population (2020)
  - Total: 236
  - Density: 5.2/sq mi (2.0/km^{2})
- FIPS code: 29-00314266
- GNIS feature ID: 766221

Clay Township is a township in Andrew County, Missouri, United States. At the 2020 census, its population was 236.

The township was named after Henry Clay, a Kentucky statesman.

== Geography ==
Clay Township covers an area of 45.35 square miles (117.5 km^{2}) and contains no incorporated settlements.

The Nodaway River comrpises the western boundary of this township. The streams of Arapahoe Creek, Newland Creek, Owl Creek, and Pedlar Creek run through this township.

An extinct hamlet called Parker or Lone Corner (also Long Corner), was located along the west bank of Owl Creek in this township. The settlement originates from a wagon road west from Bolckow that changed course here. The post office here was named Parker because of a local merchant; it was present from 1872 until 1902. In 1878, Long Corner was briefly the name of the post office. There was a schoolhouse here named Parker and or Lone Corner.

== Transportation ==
Clay Township contains one airport, Lazy W Farms Airport.

The following highways travel through the township:

- Route H
- Route U
- Route Y
