= Clay Township, Lafayette County, Missouri =

Township in Lafayette County, Missouri, U.S.

Coordinates: 39.0828°N 94.0161°W

Clay Township is an inactive township in Lafayette County, in the U.S. state of Missouri.

Clay Township was established in 1825, taking its name from Kentucky statesman Henry Clay.
