= Napoleon, Missouri =

City in Lafayette County, Missouri, United States

- City
- Location of Napoleon, Missouri
- Coordinates: 39°07′46″N 94°05′08″W
- Country: United States
- State: Missouri
- County: Lafayette
- Incorporated: 1887

Area
  - Total: 1.75 sq mi (4.53 km^{2})
  - Land: 1.75 sq mi (4.53 km^{2})
  - Water: 0.0039 sq mi (0.01 km^{2})
- Elevation: 843 ft (257 m)

Population (2020)
  - Total: 211
  - Density: 120.7/sq mi (46.61/km^{2})
- Time zone: UTC-6 (Central (CST))
  - Summer (DST): UTC-5 (CDT)
- ZIP code: 64074
- Area code: 816
- FIPS code: 29-51140
- GNIS feature ID: 2395149

Napoleon is a city in Lafayette County, Missouri, United States, and part of the Kansas City metropolitan area. It is located approximately 30 miles (48 km) east of Kansas City. The population was 211 at the 2020 census.

== History ==
Napoleon was laid out in 1836, and most likely was named after Napoleon Bonaparte. A post office has been in operation at Napoleon since 1858.

== Geography ==
According to the United States Census Bureau, the city has a total area of 1.75 square miles (4.53 km^{2}), all land.

Napoleon lies just a few miles west of Wellington, the two towns having been named after the commanders at the Battle of Waterloo. Approximately halfway between the two towns lies a small, unincorporated crossroads called "Waterloo".

Napoleon is located in the northwestern corner of Lafayette County and bordered on the north side by the Missouri River and on the south side by U.S. Route 24 and on the west by Jackson County. It is approximately 40 miles (64 km) east of the Kansas/Missouri line on the south side of the Missouri River and about 6 miles (9.7 km) east of the Independence city limits as of this writing. The town measures about 2.5 miles (4.0 km) east to west and about 1 mile (1.6 km) north to south at its widest point.

== Demographics ==
Historical population
Census	Pop.	Note	%±
1890	106		—
1900	132		24.5%
1910	146		10.6%
1920	156		6.8%
1930	131		−16.0%
1940	132		0.8%
1950	143		8.3%
1960	215		50.3%
1970	263		22.3%
1980	271		3.0%
1990	233		−14.0%
2000	208		−10.7%
2010	222		6.7%
2020	211		−5.0%
U.S. Decennial Census

=== 2010 census ===
As of the census of 2010, there were 222 people, 85 households, and 69 families living in the city. The population density was 126.9 inhabitants per square mile (49.0/km^{2}). There were 98 housing units at an average density of 56.0 per square mile (21.6/km^{2}). The racial makeup of the city was 99.1% White and 0.9% from two or more races. Hispanic or Latino of any race were 0.5% of the population.

There were 85 households, of which 29.4% had children under the age of 18 living with them, 65.9% were married couples living together, 11.8% had a female householder with no husband present, 3.5% had a male householder with no wife present, and 18.8% were non-families. 15.3% of all households were made up of individuals, and 5.9% had someone living alone who was 65 years of age or older. The average household size was 2.61 and the average family size was 2.87.

The median age in the city was 43.8 years. 21.6% of residents were under the age of 18; 9.1% were between the ages of 18 and 24; 21.3% were from 25 to 44; 35.2% were from 45 to 64; and 13.1% were 65 years of age or older. The gender makeup of the city was 49.1% male and 50.9% female.

=== 2000 census ===
As of the census of 2000, there were 208 people, 86 households, and 63 families living in the city. The population density was 119.3 inhabitants per square mile (46.1/km^{2}). There were 99 housing units at an average density of 56.8 per square mile (21.9/km^{2}). The racial makeup of the city was 94.71% White, 1.92% African American, 0.48% Asian, and 2.88% from two or more races.

There were 86 households, out of which 24.4% had children under the age of 18 living with them, 65.1% were married couples living together, 7.0% had a female householder with no husband present, and 25.6% were non-families. 22.1% of all households were made up of individuals, and 8.1% had someone living alone who was 65 years of age or older. The average household size was 2.42 and the average family size was 2.80.

In the city the population was spread out, with 19.7% under the age of 18, 11.5% from 18 to 24, 22.6% from 25 to 44, 32.7% from 45 to 64, and 13.5% who were 65 years of age or older. The median age was 42 years. For every 100 females, there were 121.3 males. For every 100 females age 18 and over, there were 114.1 males.

The median income for a household in the city was $36,875, and the median income for a family was $45,625. Males had a median income of $36,042 versus $23,036 for females. The per capita income for the city was $17,546. About 9.0% of families and 7.6% of the population were below the poverty line, including 16.2% of those under the age of 18 and none of those 65 or over.

== Education ==
It is in the Wellington-Napoleon R-IX School District.

Metropolitan Community College has the Wellington-Napoleon school district area in its service area, but not its in-district taxation area.

== See also ==
- List of cities in Missouri
