= Wellington, Missouri =

City in Lafayette County, Missouri, United States

- City
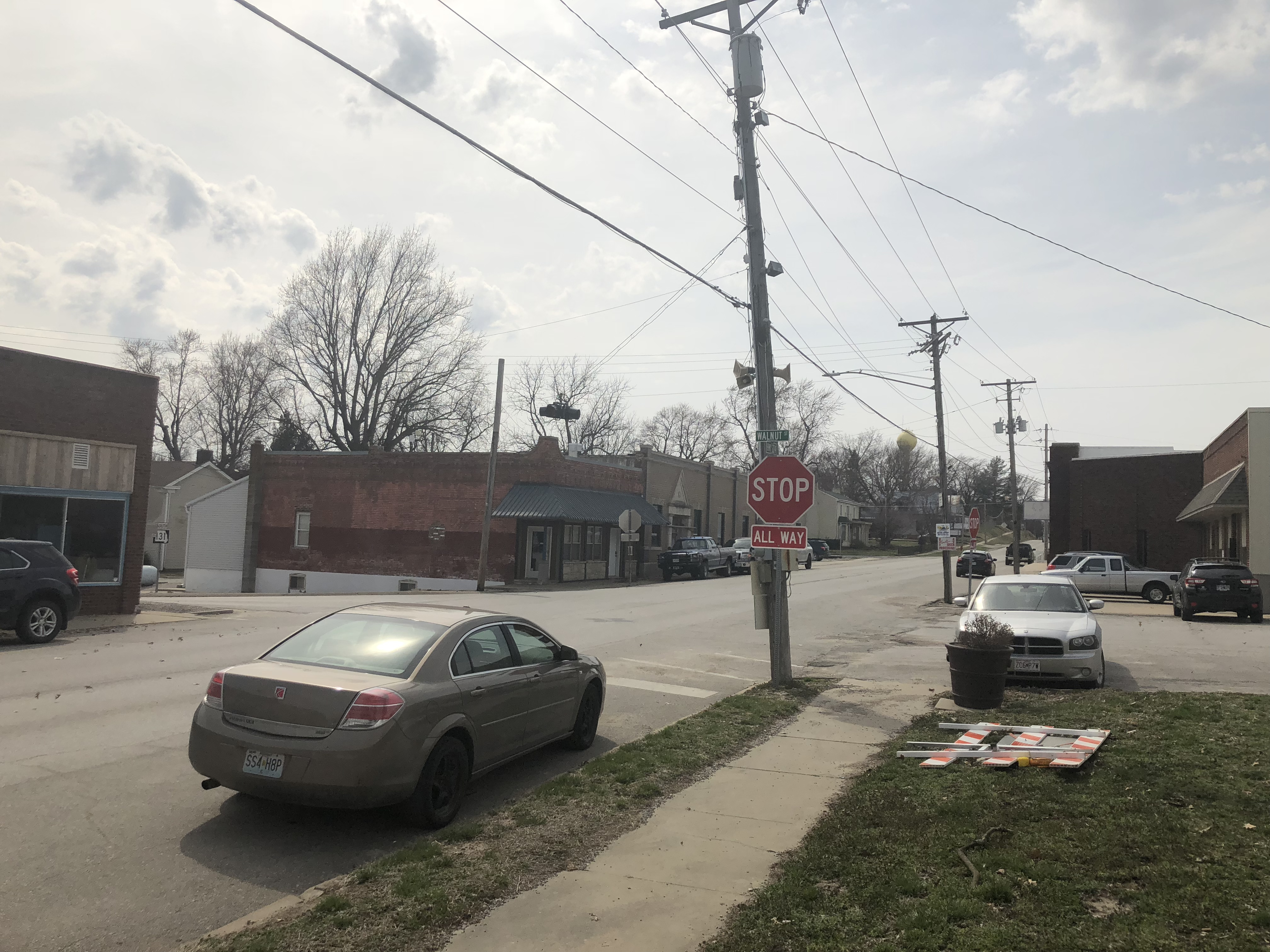
- Downtown Wellington in March 2019

- Location of Wellington, Missouri
- Coordinates: 39°08′18″N 93°59′10″W
- Country: United States
- State: Missouri
- County: Lafayette
- Incorporated: 1891

Area
  - Total: 1.13 sq mi (2.92 km^{2})
  - Land: 1.09 sq mi (2.82 km^{2})
  - Water: 0.035 sq mi (0.09 km^{2})
- Elevation: 692 ft (211 m)

Population (2020)
  - Total: 738
  - Density: 677.1/sq mi (261.43/km^{2})
- Time zone: UTC-6 (Central (CST))
  - Summer (DST): UTC-5 (CDT)
- ZIP code: 64097
- Area code: 816
- FIPS code: 29-78352
- GNIS feature ID: 2397247

Wellington is a city in Lafayette County, Missouri, and part of the Kansas City metropolitan area within the United States. It is located approximately 35 miles east of Kansas City. As of the 2020 census, Wellington had a population of 738.

== History ==
Wellington was laid out in 1837, and named after Arthur Wellesley, 1st Duke of Wellington, British commander at the Battle of Waterloo. A post office called Wellington has been in operation since 1840.

In November 2013, Leland Ray Kolkmeyer pled guilty, in federal court, of a fraud scheme in which he embezzled more than $1.5 million from Wellington-Napoleon Fire Protection District and Special Road District while being their former treasurer.

== Geography ==
According to the United States Census Bureau, the city has a total area of 1.13 square miles (2.93 km^{2}), of which 1.09 square miles (2.82 km^{2}) is land and 0.04 square miles (0.10 km^{2}) is water.

Wellington lies just a few miles east of Napoleon, Missouri, the two towns having been named after the commanders at the Battle of Waterloo. Approximately halfway between the two towns lies a small, unincorporated crossroads called "Waterloo".

== Demographics ==
Historical population
| Census | Pop. | Note | %± |
|---|---|---|---|
| 1880 | 378 | | — |
| 1890 | 446 | | 18.0% |
| 1900 | 520 | | 16.6% |
| 1910 | 558 | | 7.3% |
| 1920 | 878 | | 57.3% |
| 1930 | 756 | | −13.9% |
| 1940 | 656 | | −13.2% |
| 1950 | 649 | | −1.1% |
| 1960 | 651 | | 0.3% |
| 1970 | 720 | | 10.6% |
| 1980 | 780 | | 8.3% |
| 1990 | 779 | | −0.1% |
| 2000 | 784 | | 0.6% |
| 2010 | 812 | | 3.6% |
| 2020 | 738 | | −9.1% |
U.S. Decennial Census

=== 2010 census ===
As of the census of 2010, there were 812 people, 322 households, and 225 families living in the city. The population density was 745.0 inhabitants per square mile (287.6/km^{2}). There were 357 housing units at an average density of 327.5 per square mile (126.4/km^{2}). The racial makeup of the city was 95.9% White, 1.0% African American, 0.2% Native American, 1.0% from other races, and 1.8% from two or more races. Hispanic or Latino of any race were 2.7% of the population.

There were 322 households, of which 34.2% had children under the age of 18 living with them, 55.0% were married couples living together, 10.9% had a female householder with no husband present, 4.0% had a male householder with no wife present, and 30.1% were non-families. 27.6% of all households were made up of individuals, and 11.5% had someone living alone who was 65 years of age or older. The average household size was 2.52 and the average family size was 3.06.

The median age in the city was 38.3 years. 27.5% of residents were under the age of 18; 7.7% were between the ages of 18 and 24; 24.7% were from 25 to 44; 26.8% were from 45 to 64; and 13.4% were 65 years of age or older. The gender makeup of the city was 48.9% male and 51.1% female.

=== 2000 census ===
As of the census of 2000, there were 784 people, 343 households, and 218 families living in the city. The population density was 714.0 inhabitants per square mile (275.7/km^{2}). There were 361 housing units at an average density of 328.7 per square mile (126.9/km^{2}). The racial makeup of the city was 98.47% White, 0.51% African American, 0.26% Native American, 0.13% Pacific Islander, 0.26% from other races, and 0.38% from two or more races. Hispanic or Latino of any race were 1.79% of the population.

There were 343 households, out of which 28.0% had children under the age of 18 living with them, 50.1% were married couples living together, 11.7% had a female householder with no husband present, and 36.2% were non-families. 32.7% of all households were made up of individuals, and 16.0% had someone living alone who was 65 years of age or older. The average household size was 2.26 and the average family size was 2.85.

In the city the population was spread out, with 23.1% under the age of 18, 7.9% from 18 to 24, 28.4% from 25 to 44, 23.1% from 45 to 64, and 17.5% who were 65 years of age or older. The median age was 39 years. For every 100 females, there were 97.0 males. For every 100 females age 18 and over, there were 89.6 males.

The median income for a household in the city was $32,500, and the median income for a family was $41,071. Males had a median income of $32,031 versus $23,250 for females. The per capita income for the city was $17,997. About 6.0% of families and 6.7% of the population were below the poverty line, including 7.6% of those under age 18 and 4.8% of those age 65 or over.

== Education ==
It is in the Wellington-Napoleon R-IX School District.

Metropolitan Community College has the Wellington-Napoleon school district area in its service area, but not its in-district taxation area.

== Notable person ==
- Zach Garrett, Olympic archer

== See also ==
- List of cities in Missouri
