= Johnson Township =

Johnson Township may refer to:

== Arkansas ==
- Johnson Township, Clay County, Arkansas, in Clay County, Arkansas
- Johnson Township, Little River County, Arkansas, in Little River County, Arkansas
- Johnson Township, Logan County, Arkansas, in Logan County, Arkansas
- Johnson Township, St. Francis County, Arkansas, in St. Francis County, Arkansas
- Johnson Township, Union County, Arkansas, in Union County, Arkansas
- Johnson Township, Washington County, Arkansas

== Illinois ==
- Johnson Township, Christian County, Illinois
- Johnson Township, Clark County, Illinois

== Indiana ==
- Johnson Township, Clinton County, Indiana
- Johnson Township, Crawford County, Indiana
- Johnson Township, Gibson County, Indiana
- Johnson Township, Knox County, Indiana
- Johnson Township, LaGrange County, Indiana
- Johnson Township, LaPorte County, Indiana
- Johnson Township, Ripley County, Indiana
- Johnson Township, Scott County, Indiana

== Iowa ==
- Johnson Township, Plymouth County, Iowa
- Johnson Township, Webster County, Iowa

== Kansas ==
- Johnson Township, Ness County, Kansas, in Ness County, Kansas

== Minnesota ==
- Johnson Township, Polk County, Minnesota

== Missouri ==
- Johnson Township, Carter County, Missouri
- Johnson Township, Maries County, Missouri
- Johnson Township, Oregon County, Missouri
- Johnson Township, Polk County, Missouri
- Johnson Township, Ripley County, Missouri
- Johnson Township, Scotland County, Missouri
- Johnson Township, Washington County, Missouri

== North Dakota ==
- Johnson Township, Wells County, North Dakota, in Wells County, North Dakota

== Ohio ==
- Johnson Township, Champaign County, Ohio
