= Johnson =

Johnson may refer to:

== People and fictional characters ==
- Johnson (surname), a common surname in English
  - List of people with surname Johnson, including fictional characters
- Johnson (given name), a list of people
- Johnson (composer) (1953–2011), Indian film score composer
- Johnson (rapper) (born 1979), Danish rapper
- Mr. Johnson (born 1966), Nigerian singer

== Places ==
- Mount Johnson (disambiguation)

=== Canada ===
- Johnson, Ontario, township
- Johnson (electoral district), provincial electoral district in Quebec
- Johnson Point (British Columbia), a headland on the north side of the entrance to Belize Inlet

=== United States ===
- Johnson, Arizona
- Johnson, Arkansas, a town
- Johnson, Delaware
- Johnson, Indiana, an unincorporated town
- Johnson, Kentucky
- Johnson, Minnesota
- Johnson, Nebraska
- Johnson, New York
- Johnson, Ohio, an unincorporated community
- Johnson, Oklahoma
- Johnson, Utah
- Johnson, Vermont, a town
  - Johnson (village), Vermont
- Johnson, Washington
- Johnson, Wisconsin, a town
- Johnson (community), Wisconsin, an unincorporated community
- Johnson City (disambiguation)
- Johnson County (disambiguation)
- Johnson River (disambiguation)
- Johnson Creek (disambiguation)
- Johnson's Island, Ohio, in Lake Erie
- Johnson Island (West Virginia), a bar in the Greenbrier River
- Johnson Township (disambiguation)

=== Elsewhere ===
- Johnson Island (Antarctica)
- Johnson Point (South Georgia), a headland on South Georgia

== Arts, entertainment, and media ==
- Johnson, the title character of Johnson and Friends, an Australian children's television series
- Antony and the Johnsons, the formation of Antony Hegarty and his band
  - The Johnsons (band), music group of the English singer composer Antony Hegarty
- Johnson's Dictionary, a dictionary of the English Language by Samuel Johnson

== Brands and enterprises ==
- Big Johnson, a brand of tee shirt marketed by Maryland Brand Management
  - E. Normus Johnson, mascot for Big Johnson
- Johnson & Johnson, American pharmaceutical, medical devices and consumer packaged goods manufacturer
- Johnson Controls, a company based in Milwaukee, Wisconsin, U.S.
- Johnson Flying Service, a defunct American airline
- Johnson Financial Group, Inc., the holding company of Johnson Bank, Johnson Insurance and Banque Franck, Galland & Cie.
- Johnson Outboards, American motor boat manufacturer

== Education ==
- Johnson & Wales University, Providence, Rhode Island
- Johnson Hall (Eugene, Oregon), the administration building of the University of Oregon
- Johnson Senior High School (St. Paul, Minnesota)
- Johnson State College, Johnson, Vermont
- Johnson University, a private Christian university near Knoxville, Tennessee
- Johnson University Florida, a private Christian university near Kissimmee, Florida
- Sol C. Johnson High School (Savannah, Georgia)

== Weapons ==
- M1941 Johnson machine gun
- M1941 Johnson rifle

== Other uses ==
- Johnson, a slang term for the human penis
- Johnson Act, a 1934 U.S. securities law
- Johnson Baronets, one title in the Baronetage of Great Britain and two in the Baronetage of the United Kingdom
- Johnson Formation, a geologic formation of shale in Nebraska, Kansas, and Oklahoma
- Johnson counter, also called a Möbius counter, switch-tail ring counter, twisted ring counter, or walking ring counter, or Möbius counter
- Johnson solid, a convex polyhedron in geometry
- Johnson Space Center, in the city of Houston, Texas, U.S.
