= Mount Johnson =

Mount Johnson, Johnson Mountain, or Johnson Peak may refer to:

== Places ==
- Mount Johnson, Lower Canada, Province of Canada; former name of Mont-Saint-Grégoire, Quebec, Canada
- Johnson Mountain, Montana, USA

=== Mountains ===
- Johnson Peak, Tuolumne Meadows, Yosemite National Park, California, USA
- Johnson Peak (Antarctica), Hart Hills, Ellsworth Land, Antarctica
- Johnson Peaks, Mittlere Petermann Range, Wohlthat Mountains, Queen Maud Land, Antarctica
- Johnson Mountain (Utah), Zion National Park, Utah
- Johnson Mountain (Washington), Cascade Range, Washington State, USA
- Mount Johnson (California), Sierra Nevada range, USA
- Mount Johnson (Washington), Olympics Mountains, Washington State, USA
- Mount Johnson (Alaska), Denali National Park, Alaska, USA

== Other uses ==
- Mount Johnson, a colonial farmstead on the Mohawk River, in the Province of New York, owned by Sir William Johnson, 1st Baronet
- Mount Johnson, a Loyalist farmstead near Chambly, Quebec, owned by Sir John Johnson, 2nd Baronet

== See also ==
- Johnson (disambiguation)
- La Mont Johnson (disambiguation)
- Mont and Harriet Johnson House, Springville, Utah, USA; formerly owned by Mont Johnson
- Johnson Mountain Boys, U.S. band
