= Johnson Township, Illinois =

Johnson Township may refer to one of the following places in the State of Illinois:

- Johnson Township, Christian County, Illinois
- Johnson Township, Clark County, Illinois

See also

- Johnson Township (disambiguation)
