= Johnson Creek =

Johnson Creek may refer to:

- Johnson Creek (Georgia), a waterway of the Atlantic Intracoastal Waterway
- Johnson Creek Airport, a grass airstrip in central Idaho
- Johnson Creek (Mississippi River), a stream in Minnesota
- Johnson Creek (Davis Creek), a stream in Missouri
- Johnson Creek (Turnback Creek), a stream in Missouri
- Johnson Creek (Ararat River tributary), a stream in North Carolina and Virginia
- Johnson Creek (Willamette River), a tributary of the Willamette River in Oregon
- Johnson Creek, a tributary of the Clackamas River northwest of Oregon City, Oregon
- Johnson Creek (Lithia Springs Creek tributary), a tributary of Lithia Springs Creek in Pennsylvania
- Johnson Creek (James River), a stream in South Dakota
- Johnson Creek (Texas), a tributary in the Trinity River watershed in north Texas
- Johnson Creek (Iron County, Utah)
- Johnson Creek (Skookumchuck River tributary), a stream in Washington state
- Johnson Creek (Rock River tributary), a stream in southern Wisconsin
- Johnson Creek, Wisconsin, a village in southern Wisconsin

== See also ==
- Ardenwald-Johnson Creek, Portland, Oregon
- Johnson Branch (disambiguation)
- Johnson River (disambiguation)
- Johnsons Creek Natural Area Preserve, a Natural Area Preserve in Alleghany County, Virginia
