= Johnson River =

Johnson River is the name of the following rivers:

In New Zealand

- Johnson River (New Zealand), tributary of the Allen River

In the United States

- Johnson River (Kuskokwim), tributary of the Kuskokwim River in Alaska
- Johnson River (Tanana), tributary of the Tanana River in Alaska
- Johnson River (Minnesota)

== See also ==
- Johnson (disambiguation)
- Johnson Creek (disambiguation)
