= Lamont Johnson (disambiguation) =

La'Mont Johnson, laMont Johnson, Lamont Johnson, or variation, may refer to:

- Lamont Johnson (1922–2010) U.S. filmmaker
- LaMont Johnson (1941–1999) U.S. jazz pianist
- Lamont Johnson (fretless bassist) (1955-2024) U.S. musician

== See also ==
- Johnson (disambiguation)
- Mont Johnson, former owner of the Springville, Utah, USA, structure Mont and Harriet Johnson House
- Mount Johnson (disambiguation)
