= Johnson Mountain (Washington) =

Mountain in Washington (state), United States

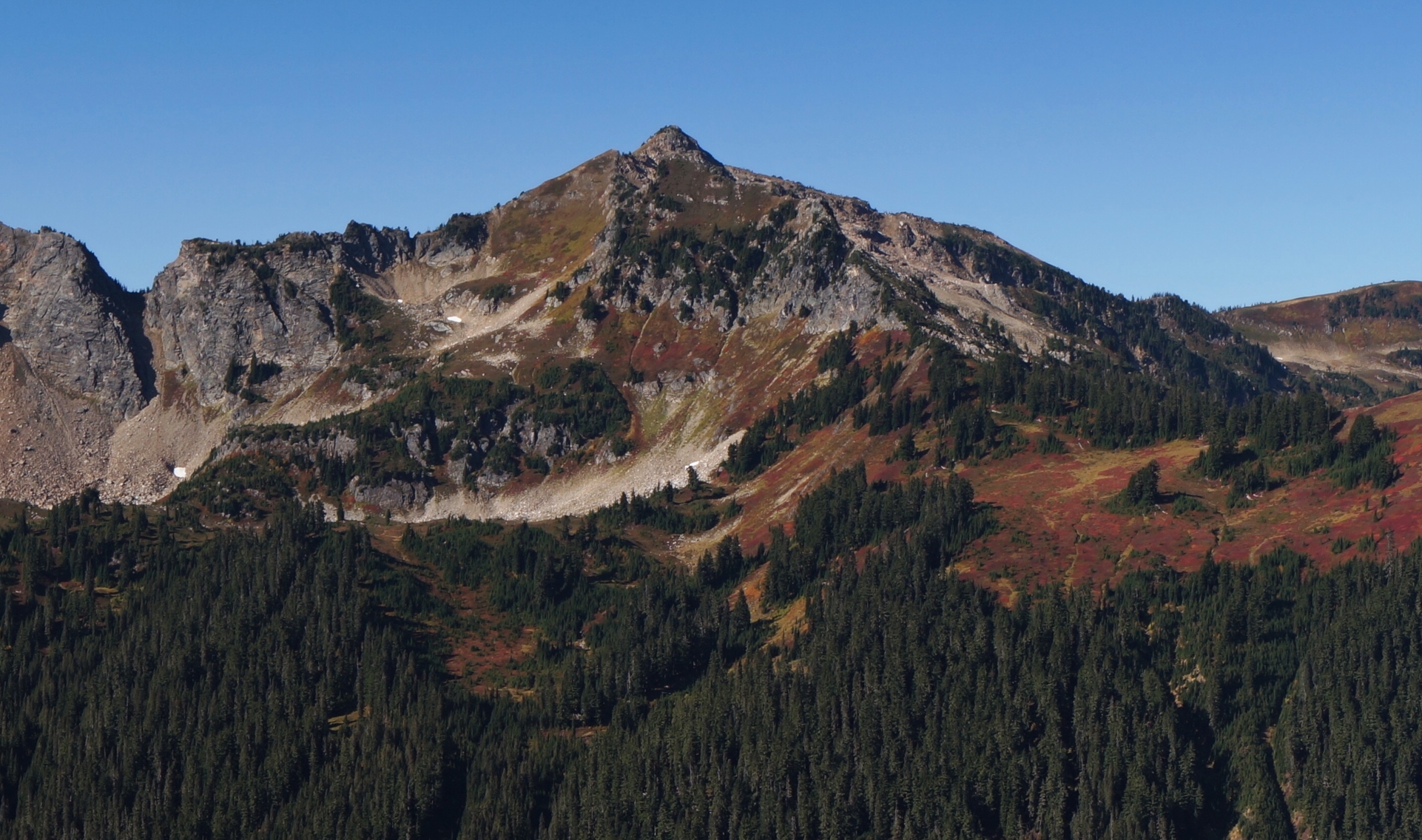
- Johnson Mountain seen from Pilot Ridge

Highest point
- Elevation: 6,721 ft (2,049 m)
- Prominence: 1,241 ft (378 m)
- Parent peak: Whittier Peak
- Isolation: 3.31 mi (5.33 km)
- Coordinates: 47°59′42″N 121°10′21″W

Geography
- Location within Washington (state) Location within the United States
- Interactive map of Johnson Mountain
- Country: United States
- State: Washington
- County: Snohomish
- Protected area: Glacier Peak Wilderness
- Parent range: Cascade Range
- Topo map: USGS Benchmark Mountain

Geology
- Rock age: Late Cretaceous
- Rock type: Migmatitic Gneiss

Climbing
- Easiest route: Hiking trail

Johnson Mountain is a 6,721-foot (2,049-metre) mountain summit located in the Glacier Peak Wilderness of the North Cascades in Washington state. The mountain is situated in eastern Snohomish County, in the Mt. Baker-Snoqualmie National Forest. The nearest higher peak is White Mountain, 3.3 mi (5.3 km) to the northeast, along with Indian Head Peak 3.38 mi (5.44 km) to the east. Precipitation runoff from the mountain drains into tributaries of the Sauk River. The mountain's name honors Mackinaw Johnson, a prospector who had a cabin in the vicinity.

== Geology ==
The North Cascades feature some of the most rugged topography in the Cascade Range with craggy peaks, spires, ridges, and deep glacial valleys. Geological events occurring many years ago created the diverse topography and drastic elevation changes over the Cascade Range leading to the various climate differences.

The history of the formation of the Cascade Mountains dates back millions of years ago to the late Eocene Epoch. With the North American Plate overriding the Pacific Plate, episodes of volcanic igneous activity persisted. Glacier Peak, a stratovolcano that is 8.52 mi (13.71 km) north of Johnson Mountain, began forming in the mid-Pleistocene. In addition, small fragments of the oceanic and continental lithosphere called terranes created the North Cascades about 50 million years ago.

During the Pleistocene period dating back over two million years ago, glaciation advancing and retreating repeatedly scoured the landscape leaving deposits of rock debris. The U-shaped cross section of the river valleys is a result of recent glaciation. Uplift and faulting in combination with glaciation have been the dominant processes which have created the tall peaks and deep valleys of the North Cascades area.

== Climate ==
Johnson Mountain is located in the marine west coast climate zone of western North America. Most weather fronts originating in the Pacific Ocean travel northeast toward the Cascade Mountains. As fronts approach the Cascades, they are forced upward by the peaks (orographic lift), causing them to drop their moisture in the form of rain or snowfall onto the Cascades. As a result, the west side of the North Cascades experiences high precipitation, especially during the winter months in the form of snowfall. Because of maritime influence, snow tends to be wet and heavy, resulting in high avalanche danger. During winter months, weather is usually cloudy, but, due to high pressure systems over the Pacific Ocean that intensify during summer months, there is often little or no cloud cover during the summer. Due to its temperate climate and proximity to the Pacific Ocean, areas west of the Cascade Crest very rarely experience temperatures below 0 °F (−18 °C) or above 80 °F (27 °C).

== Gallery ==
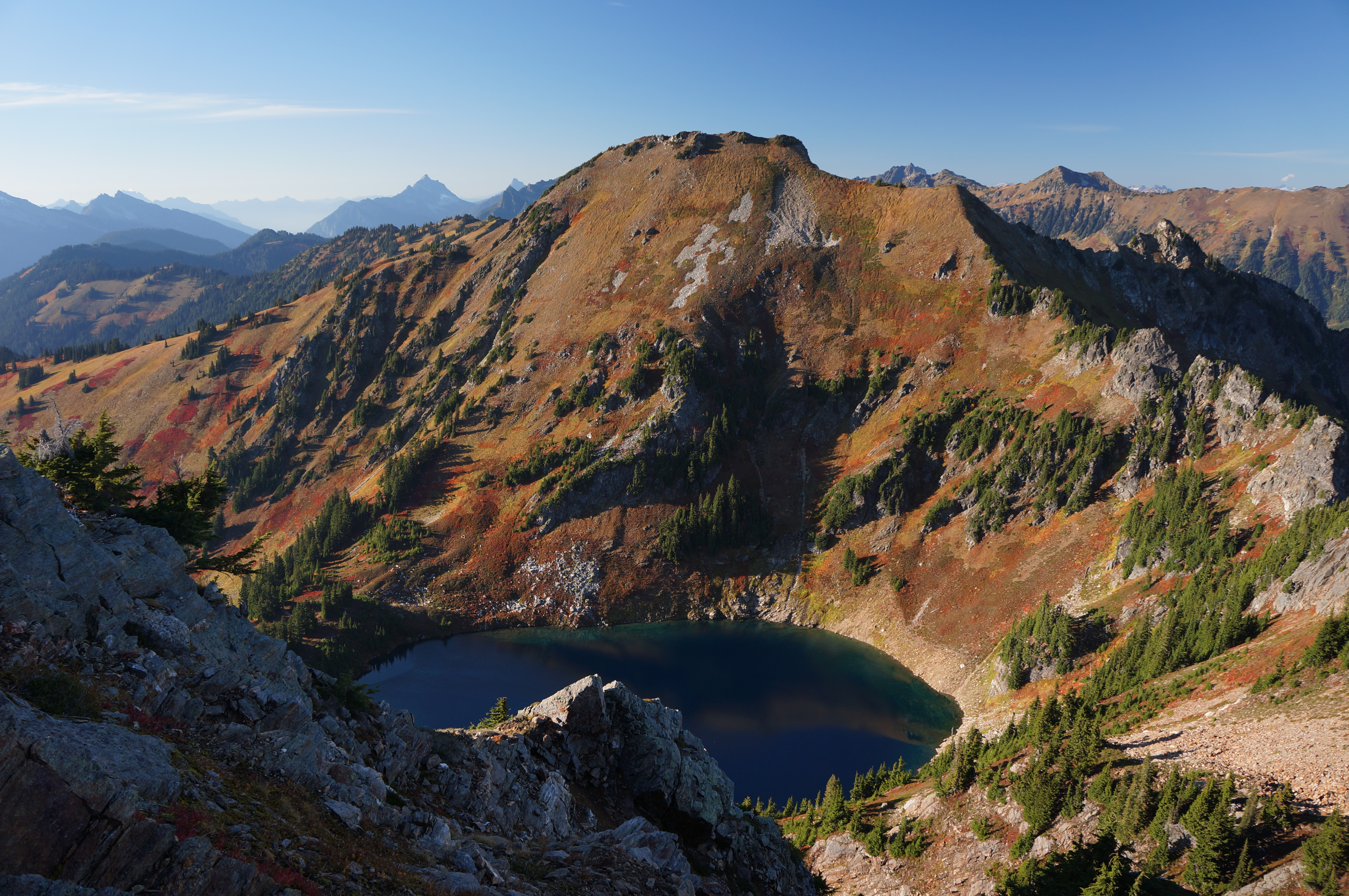
Johnson Mountain and Blue Lake seen from Blue Mountain

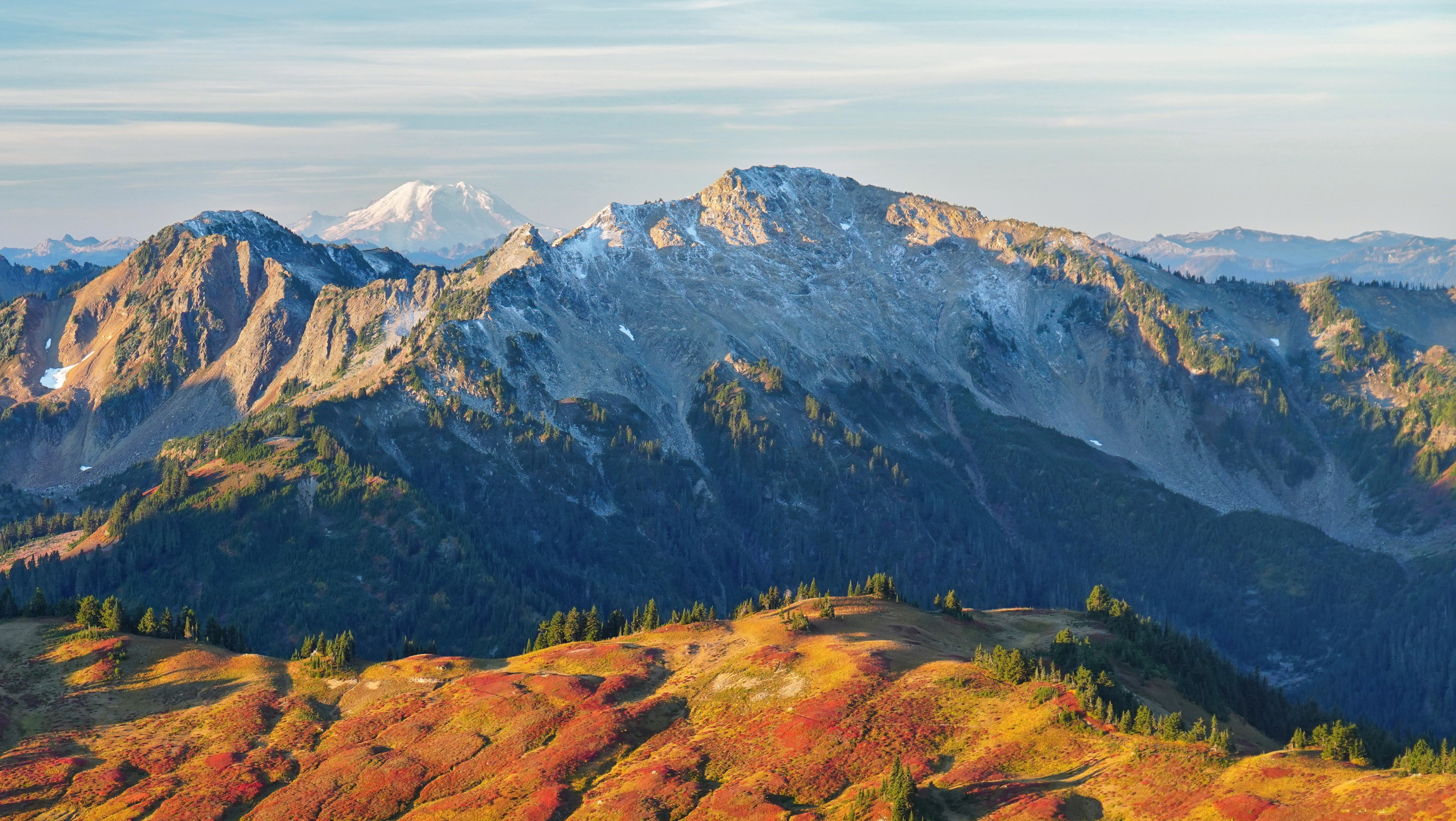
North aspect

== See also ==
- Geography of the North Cascades
