= Johnson Branch =

Johnson Branch may refer to:

- Johnson Branch (Fox River), a stream in Missouri
- Johnson Branch (Meramec River), a stream in Missouri
