= Mount David (Washington) =

Mountain in Washington (state), United States

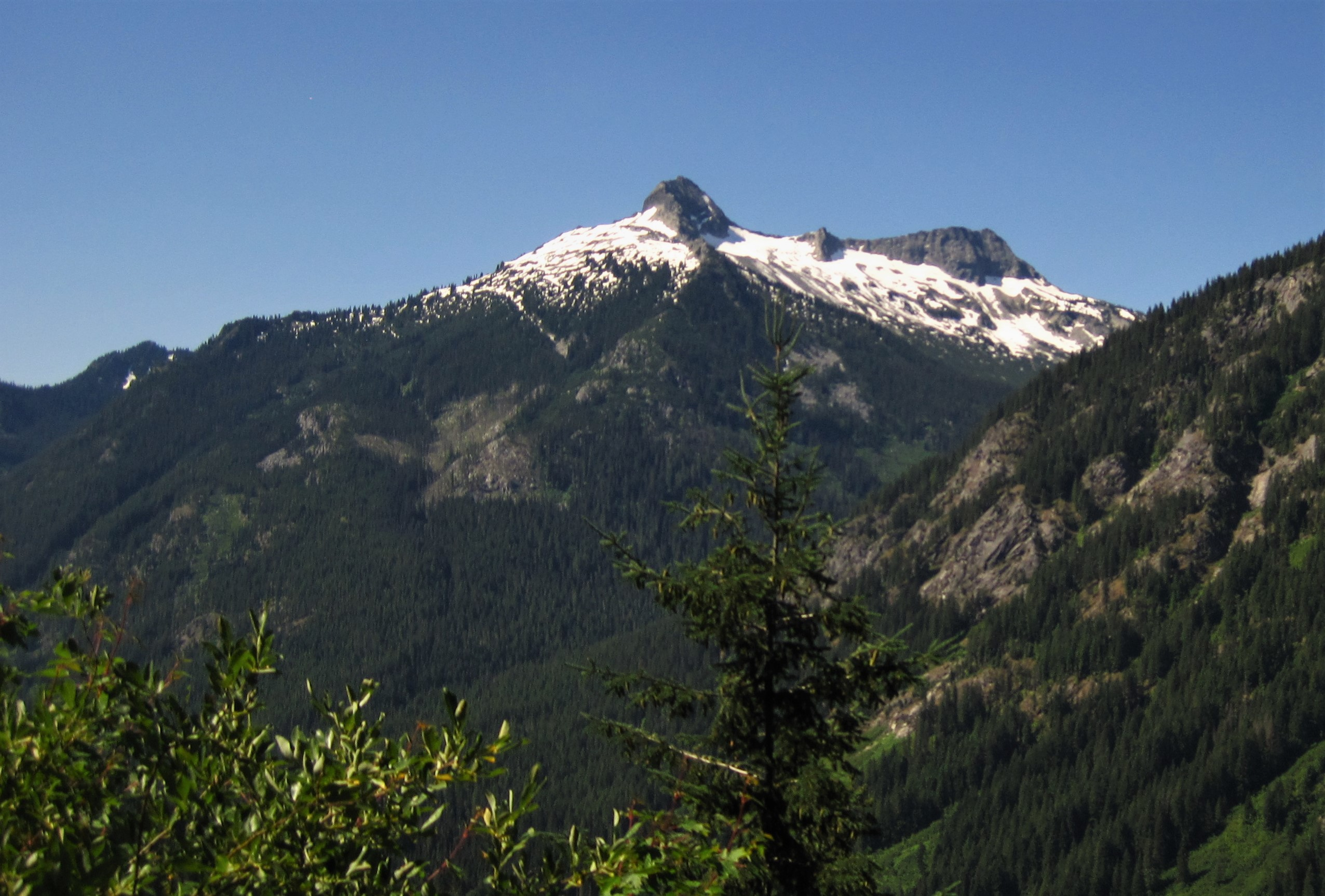
- Mt. David centered, from the north

Highest point
- Elevation: 7,420 ft (2,260 m)
- Prominence: 2,420 ft (740 m)
- Parent peak: Kololo Peaks (8,200+ ft)
- Isolation: 5.69 mi (9.16 km)
- Coordinates: 47°57′47″N 120°59′22″W

Geography
- Location within Washington (state) Location within the United States
- Interactive map of Mount David
- Country: United States
- State: Washington
- County: Chelan
- Protected area: Glacier Peak Wilderness
- Parent range: North Cascades; Cascade Range
- Topo map: USGS Mount David

Geology
- Rock type(s): mica schist, quartzite, breccia

Climbing
- Easiest route: Hiking trail

Mount David is a prominent 7,420-foot (2,260-metre) mountain summit located in Chelan County of Washington state. The mountain is situated in the Glacier Peak Wilderness, on land managed by the Okanogan-Wenatchee National Forest. Mount David is the highest point of Wenatchee Ridge, a subrange which also includes Indian Head Peak, Whittier Peak, Mount Saul, and Mount Jonathan. Its nearest higher neighbor is Bandit Peak, 5.69 mi (9.16 km) to the east-northeast. Precipitation runoff from Mount David drains into tributaries of the White River. Although modest in elevation, relief is significant since Mt. David rises 5,100 feet above the White River Valley in two miles. This peak was named for the biblical David by Albert Hale Sylvester, a pioneer surveyor, explorer, topographer, and forest supervisor in the Cascades who named thousands of natural features. This mountain can be climbed via the strenuous seven-mile Mount David Trail with over 5,000 feet of elevation gain.

== Geology ==
The North Cascades feature some of the most rugged topography in the Cascade Range with craggy peaks, spires, ridges, and deep glacial valleys. Geological events occurring many years ago created the diverse topography and drastic elevation changes over the Cascade Range leading to the various climate differences.

The history of the formation of the Cascade Mountains dates back millions of years ago to the late Eocene Epoch. With the North American Plate overriding the Pacific Plate, episodes of volcanic igneous activity persisted. Glacier Peak, a stratovolcano that is 11.8 mi (19.0 km) north of Mount David, began forming in the mid-Pleistocene. Due to Glacier Peak's proximity to Mount David, volcanic ash is common in the area. In addition, small fragments of the oceanic and continental lithosphere called terranes created the North Cascades about 50 million years ago.

During the Pleistocene period dating back over two million years ago, glaciation advancing and retreating repeatedly scoured and shaped the landscape. Uplift and faulting in combination with glaciation have been the dominant processes which have created the tall peaks and deep valleys of the North Cascades area.

== Climate ==
Weather fronts originating in the Pacific Ocean travel east toward the Cascade Mountains. As fronts approach, they are forced upward by the peaks (orographic lift), causing them to drop their moisture in the form of rain or snowfall onto the Cascades. As a result, the Cascades experience high precipitation, especially during the winter months in the form of snowfall. During winter months, weather is usually cloudy, but, due to high pressure systems over the Pacific Ocean that intensify during summer months, there is often little or no cloud cover during the summer. The months July through September offer the most favorable weather for viewing or climbing this peak.

== Gallery ==
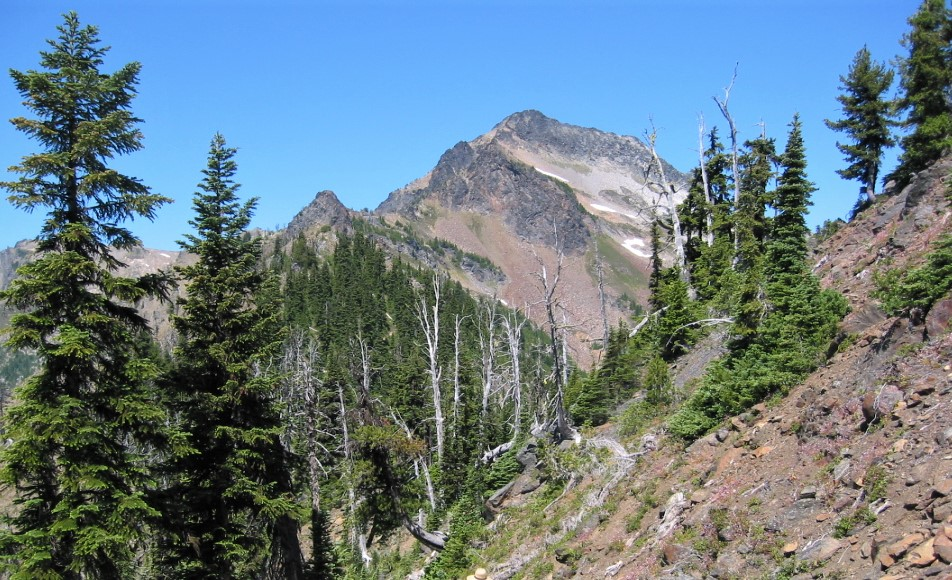
Southeast aspect from the trail

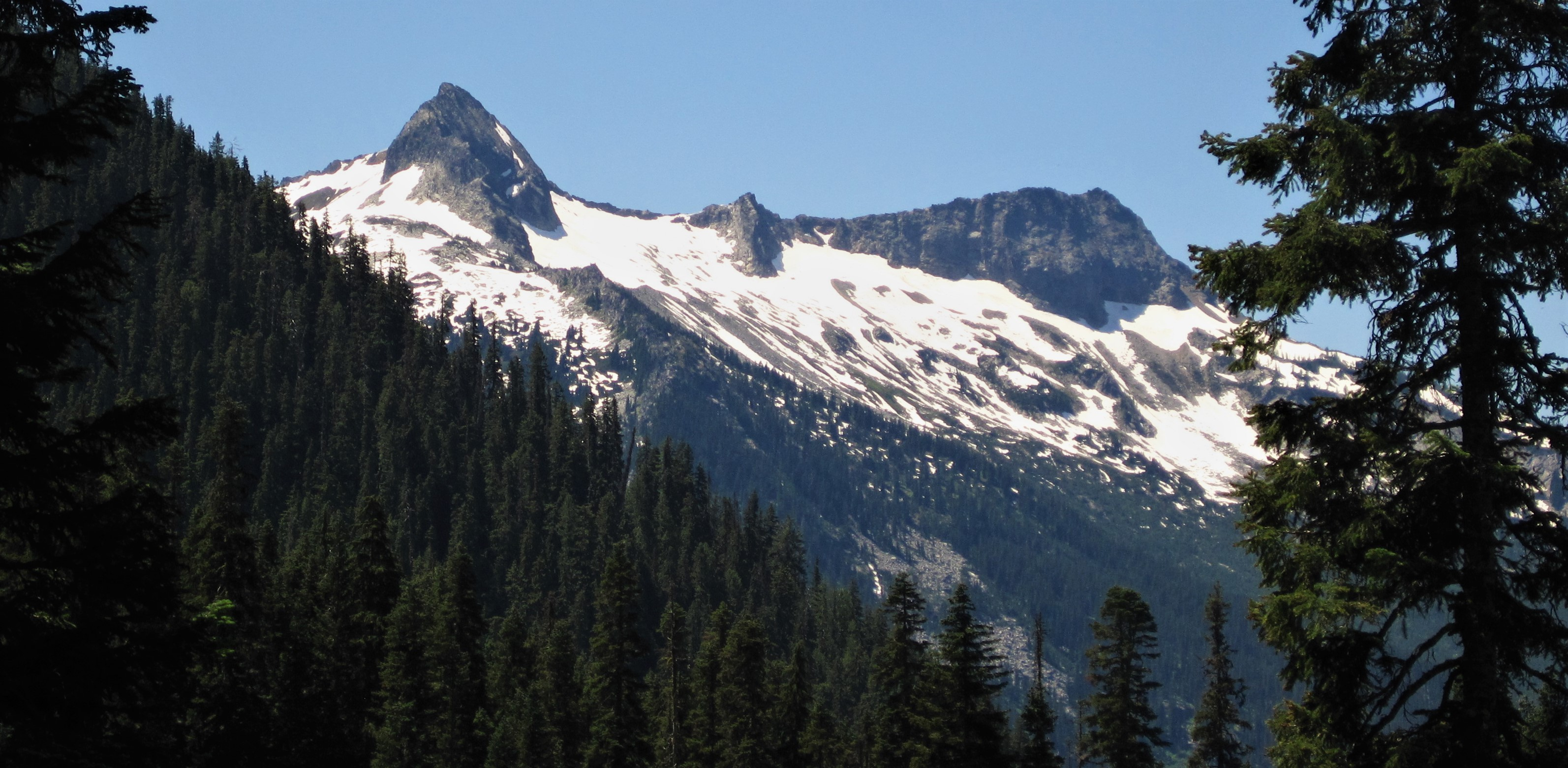
Mount David (left) and Mount Jonathan (right) are named for the biblical David and Jonathan

== See also ==
- Geography of Washington (state)
- Geology of the Pacific Northwest
- List of mountain peaks of Washington (state)
