= Johnson Township, Oregon County, Missouri =

Township in Oregon County, Missouri, U.S.

Coordinates: 36.6572°N 91.2442°W

Johnson Township is an inactive township in Oregon County, in the U.S. state of Missouri.

Johnson Township has the name of James Johnson, a pioneer citizen.
