= Johnson City =

Johnson City may refer to

== Places ==
=== United States ===
- Johnson City, Kansas
- Johnson City, Missouri
- Johnson City, New York
- Johnson City, Oregon
- Johnson City, Tennessee
- Johnson City, Texas

== See also ==
- Johnston City, Illinois
