= Johnson Branch (Fox River tributary) =

Stream in the American state of Missouri

Coordinates: 40.46004°N 91.7115531°W

Johnson Branch is a stream in Clark County in the U.S. state of Missouri. It is a tributary of the Fox River.

Johnson Branch has the name of James Johnson.

== See also ==
- List of rivers of Missouri
