= Johnson Township, Maries County, Missouri =

Township in Maries County, Missouri, U.S.

Coordinates: 38.1003°N 91.7197°W

Johnson Township is an inactive township in Maries County, in the U.S. state of Missouri.

Johnson Township has the name of Thomas Jefferson Johnson, a state legislator.
