= Johnson Township, Ripley County, Missouri =

Township in Ripley County, Missouri, U.S.

Coordinates: 36.7442°N 90.6953°W

Johnson Township is an inactive township in Ripley County, in the U.S. state of Missouri.

Johnson Township was erected in 1871, and named after William Johnson, an early citizen.
