= Johnson Creek (Mississippi River tributary) =

Stream in Stearns County, Minnesota, U.S.

Coordinates: 45°28′58″N 94°07′40″W

Johnson Creek is a stream in Stearns County, in the U.S. state of Minnesota.

Johnson Creek was named for L. P. Johnson, an early settler and afterward county official.

== See also ==
- List of rivers of Minnesota
