= Johnson Branch (Meramec River tributary) =

River in Missouri, United States of America

Coordinates: 38.353941°N 90.859302°W

Johnson Branch (also called Johnson Creek) is a stream in Franklin County in the U.S. state of Missouri. It is a tributary of the Meramec River.

Johnson Branch has the name of the local Johnson family.

== See also ==
- List of rivers of Missouri
