= Johnson River (New Zealand) =

River in New Zealand

- Route of the Johnson River
- Mouth of the Johnson River Johnson River (New Zealand) (South Island)

Location
- Country: New Zealand

Physical characteristics
- Source: Confluence of the Silver Creek and an unnamed stream
  - coordinates: 41.3934°S 172.2612°E
- Mouth
  - location: Allen River
  - coordinates: 41°28′32″S 172°17′09″E
- Length: 13 kilometres (8.1 mi)

Basin features
- Progression: Johnson River → Allen River → Mōkihinui River North Branch → Mōkihinui River → Karamea Bight → Tasman Sea
- Tributaries
  - right: Fugel Creek, Little Fugel Creek, Deep Creek

The Johnson River is a river of the northwestern South Island of New Zealand. It is located within the Radiant Range and flows mostly in a southerly direction to join with the Allen River shortly before the latter joins the Mōkihinui River North Branch.

== See also ==
- List of rivers of New Zealand
