= Johnson, Washington =

Unincorporated community in Washington, United States

Johnson
- Unincorporated community
- Location within Washington (state) Location within the United States Location within North America
- Coordinates: 46°37′53.6″N 117°8′16.6″W
- Country: United States
- State: Washington
- County: Whitman
- Elevation: 2,638 ft (804 m)
- Time zone: UTC-8 (Pacific (PST))
  - Summer (DST): UTC-7 (PDT)
- ZIP code: 99113
- Area code: 509
- GNIS feature ID: 1512333

Johnson is an unincorporated community in Whitman County, in the U.S. state of Washington.

== History ==
A post office called Johnson was established in 1888, and remained in operation until 1956. The community was named after Jonathan Johnson, the original owner of the town site.
