= Johnson Peak (Antarctica) =

Mountain in Antarctica

Johnson Peak (83°43′S 89°16′W) is a low mountain, 2,010 metres (6,600 ft) high, which forms the western part of the Hart Hills in Antarctica. It was named by the Advisory Committee on Antarctic Names in 1982 after Robert J.R. Johnson, a newspaper correspondent attached to the United States Antarctic Research Program Pagano Nunatak – Hart Hills expedition of 1964–65.

== See also ==
- Mountains in Antarctica
