= Johnson Creek (James River tributary) =

Stream in South Dakota, U.S.

Coordinates: 43°38′26″N 97°52′38″W

Johnson Creek is a stream in the U.S. state of South Dakota. It is a tributary of the James River.

Johnson Creek was named after a pioneer settler.

== See also ==
- List of rivers of South Dakota
