= Indian Head Peak =

Mountain in Washington (state), United States

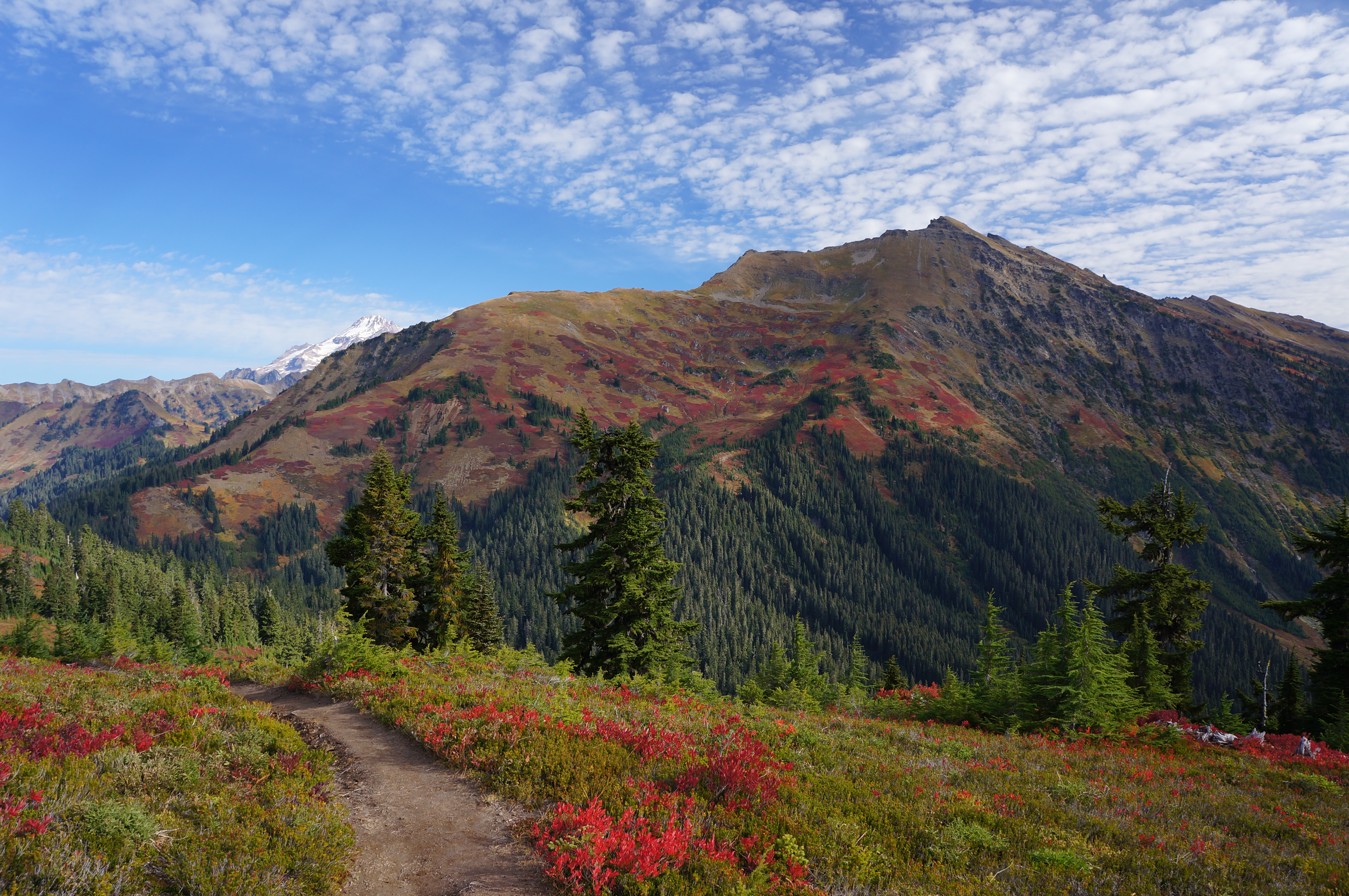
- Indian Head Peak from Pacific Crest Trail

Highest point
- Elevation: 7,448 ft (2,270 m)
- Prominence: 2,054 ft (626 m)
- Parent peak: Kololo Peaks (8,200+ ft)
- Isolation: 3.92 mi (6.31 km)
- Coordinates: 48°00′29″N 121°05′52″W

Geography
- Location within Washington (state) Location within the United States
- Interactive map of Indian Head Peak
- Country: United States
- State: Washington
- County: Chelan
- Protected area: Glacier Peak Wilderness
- Parent range: Cascade Range
- Topo map: USGS Glacier Peak East

Geology
- Rock age: Late Cretaceous
- Rock type: Schist

Climbing
- First ascent: 1870
- Easiest route: class 2 scrambling

Indian Head Peak is a prominent 7,448-foot (2,270-metre) mountain summit located in the Glacier Peak Wilderness, in the North Cascades of Washington state. The mountain is situated in Chelan County, on land managed by the Okanogan–Wenatchee National Forest. Its nearest higher neighbor is Kololo Peaks, 3.29 mi (5.29 km) to the north. Indian Head Peak is the second-highest point on Wenatchee Ridge, a subrange which also includes Mount Saul, Whittier Peak, and Mount David. Precipitation runoff from the peak drains into Indian Creek and White River which are tributaries of the Wenatchee River.

The mountain's name was given by Albert Hale Sylvester (1871–1944), for its resemblance to an "Indian's headdress" when viewed from the south, near Kodak Peak. Sylvester was a pioneer surveyor, explorer, topographer, and forest supervisor in the Cascades. Indian Head Peak was first climbed on July 2, 1870 by railroad surveyors D. C. Linsley and John A. Tennant.

== Climate ==
Indian Head Peak is located in the marine west coast climate zone of western North America. Most weather fronts originating in the Pacific Ocean travel northeast toward the Cascade Mountains. As fronts approach the North Cascades, they are forced upward by the peaks (orographic lift), causing them to drop their moisture in the form of rain or snowfall onto the Cascades. As a result, the west side of the North Cascades experiences high precipitation, especially during the winter months in the form of snowfall. Because of maritime influence, snow tends to be wet and heavy, resulting in high avalanche danger. During winter months, weather is usually cloudy, but, due to high pressure systems over the Pacific Ocean that intensify during summer months, there is often little or no cloud cover during the summer. Due to its temperate climate and proximity to the Pacific Ocean, areas west of the Cascade Crest very rarely experience temperatures below 0 °F (−18 °C) or above 80 °F (27 °C). The months July through September offer the most favorable weather for viewing or climbing this peak.

== Geology ==
The North Cascades feature some of the most rugged topography in the Cascade Range with craggy peaks, spires, ridges, and deep glacial valleys. Geological events occurring many years ago created the diverse topography and drastic elevation changes over the Cascade Range leading to the various climate differences.

The history of the formation of the Cascade Mountains dates back millions of years ago to the late Eocene Epoch. With the North American Plate overriding the Pacific Plate, episodes of volcanic igneous activity persisted. Glacier Peak, a stratovolcano that is 7.22 mi (11.62 km) north of Indian Head Peak, began forming in the mid-Pleistocene. Due to Glacier Peak's proximity to Indian Head Peak, volcanic ash is common in the area. In addition, small fragments of the oceanic and continental lithosphere called terranes created the North Cascades about 50 million years ago.

During the Pleistocene period dating back over two million years ago, glaciation advancing and retreating repeatedly scoured the landscape leaving deposits of rock debris. The U-shaped cross section of the river valleys is a result of recent glaciation. Uplift and faulting in combination with glaciation have been the dominant processes which have created the tall peaks and deep valleys of the North Cascades area.

== Gallery ==
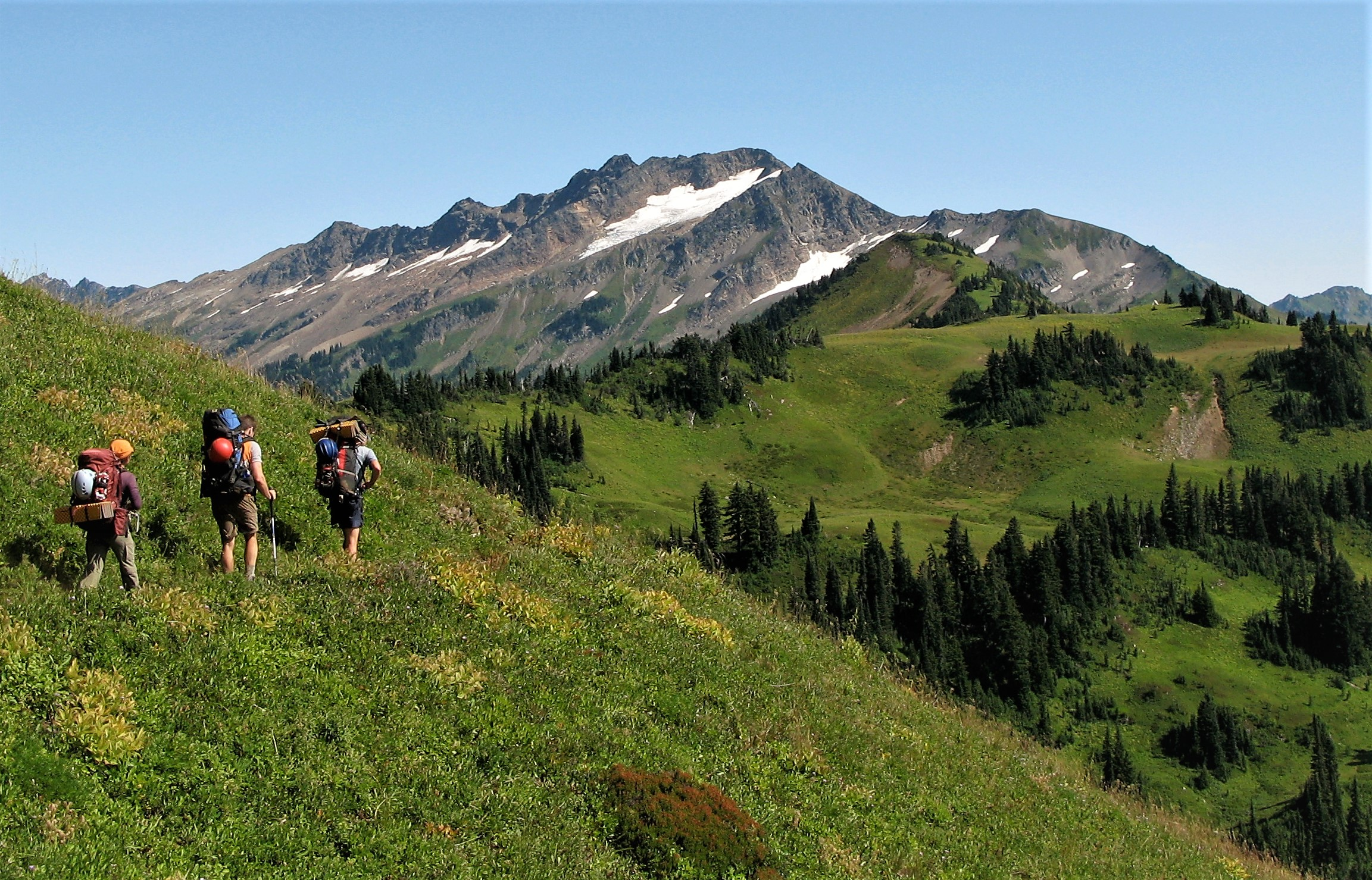
Indian Head Peak

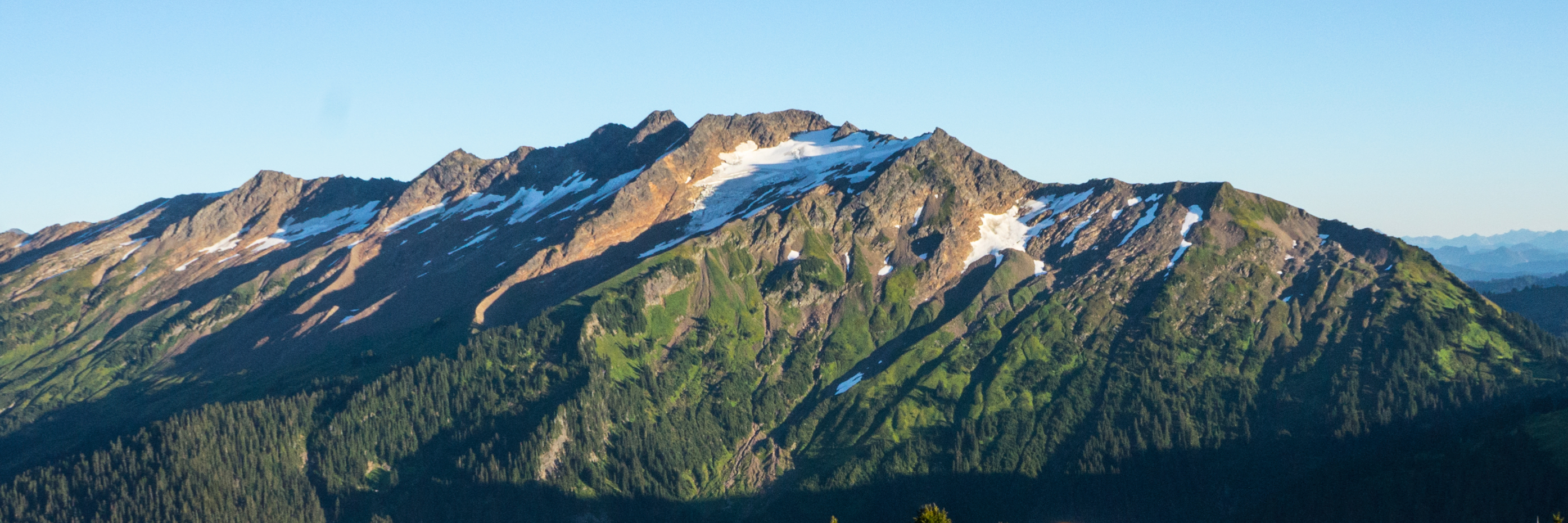
Indian Head Peak showing the north aspect with small remaining glacier

== See also ==
- List of mountain peaks of Washington (state)
- Geography of the North Cascades
