= Johnson Creek (Davis Creek tributary) =

Stream in Missouri, United States of America

Coordinates: 39.0314023°N 93.6538269°W

Johnson Creek is a stream in Lafayette County in the U.S. state of Missouri. It is a tributary of Davis Creek.

Johnson Creek most likely has the name of William Johnson, a pioneer citizen.

== See also ==
- List of rivers of Missouri
