= Johnson Township, Carter County, Missouri =

Township in Carter County, Missouri, U.S.

Coordinates: 36.8694°N 90.7919°W

Johnson Township is a township in Carter County, in the U.S. state of Missouri.

Johnson Township was established in 1873, taking its name from President Andrew Johnson.
