= Allen River =

River in New Zealand

- Route of the Allen River
- Mouth of the Allen River Allen River (South Island)

Location
- Country: New Zealand

Physical characteristics
- Source: Allen Range (Left Branch)
  - coordinates: 41.3999°S 172.2723°E
- 2nd source: Allen Range (Right Branch)
  - coordinates: 41.4160°S 172.3413°E
- Mouth
  - location: Mōkihinui River North Branch
  - coordinates: 41°28′39″S 172°17′21″E
  - elevation: 310 m (1,020 ft)

Basin features
- Progression: Allen River → Mōkihinui River North Branch → Mōkihinui River → Karamea Bight → Tasman Sea
- Tributaries
  - right: Johnson River

The Allen River is a river in the West Coast district of the South Island of New Zealand. It drains the south side of the Allen Range, elevations to 1,450 metres (4,760 ft), which forms part of the boundary between West Coast and Tasman districts. The river has left and right branches for half its length, and the right branch has a major tributary stream in a valley between the two branches. The united river flows south through a narrow gorge and is joined by the Johnson River 200 metres (660 ft) upstream of its confluence with the North branch of the Mōkihinui River.

== See also ==
- List of rivers of New Zealand
