= Whittier Peak =

Mountain in Washington (state), United States

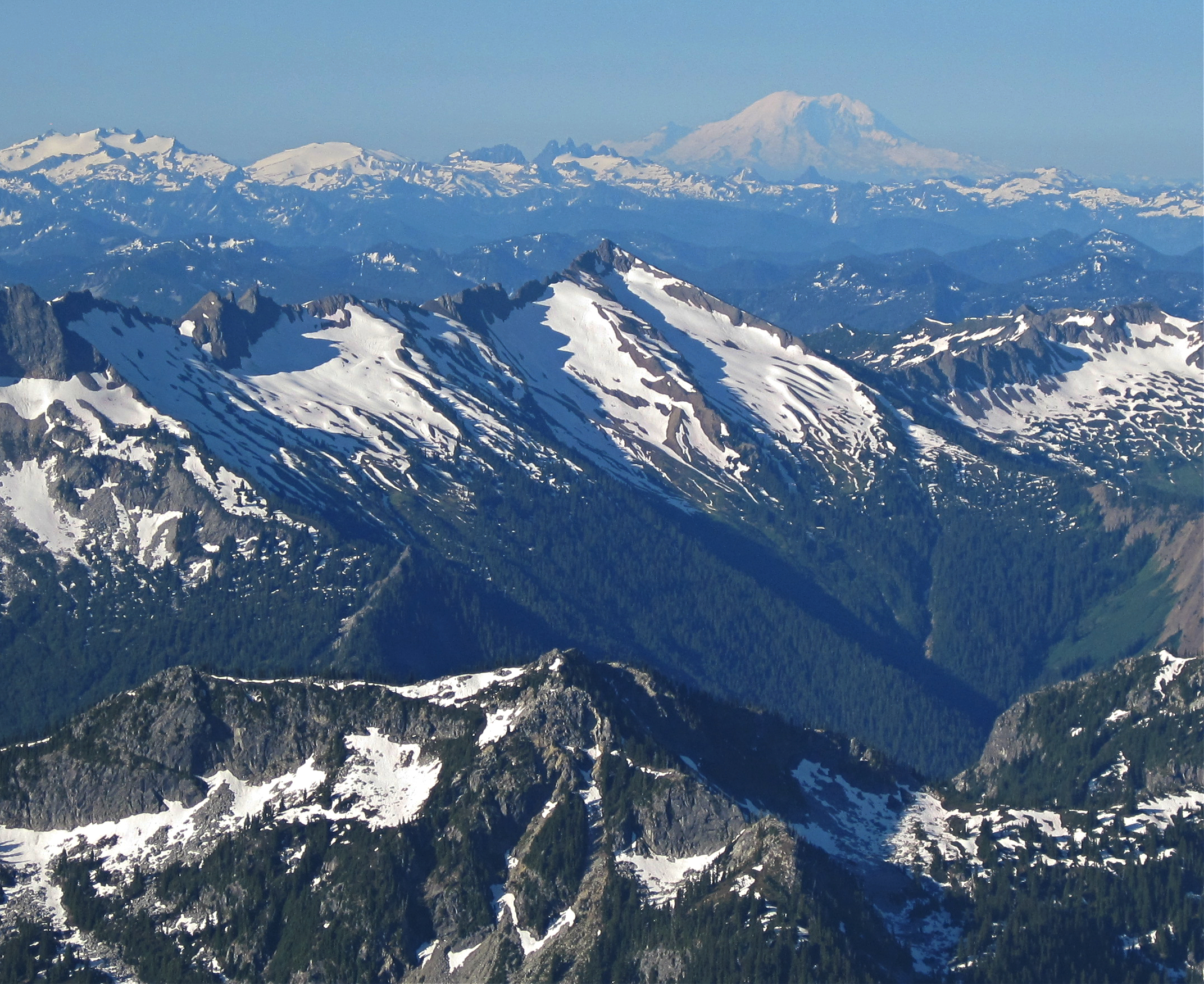
- Whittier Peak centered. Viewed from Clark Mountain

Highest point
- Elevation: 7,281 ft (2,219 m)
- Prominence: 521 ft (159 m)
- Parent peak: Mount David (7,420 ft)
- Isolation: 2.23 mi (3.59 km)
- Coordinates: 47°56′49″N 121°01′55″W

Naming
- Etymology: John Greenleaf Whittier

Geography
- Location within Washington (state) Location within the United States
- Country: United States
- State: Washington
- County: Chelan
- Protected area: Glacier Peak Wilderness
- Parent range: Cascade Range
- Topo map: USGS Poe Mountain

Geology
- Rock age: Late Cretaceous
- Rock type: Schist

Climbing
- Easiest route: Scrambling

Whittier Peak is a 7,281-foot (2,219-metre) mountain summit located in the Glacier Peak Wilderness of the North Cascades in Washington state. The mountain is situated in Chelan County, in the Wenatchee National Forest. Its nearest higher neighbor is Mount David, 2.26 mi (3.64 km) to the northeast, and Indian Head Peak is 5.2 mi (8.4 km) to the northwest. Precipitation runoff from Whittier Peak drains into tributaries of the Wenatchee River. The peak was named for poet John Greenleaf Whittier by Albert Hale Sylvester, pioneer surveyor, explorer, topographer, and forest supervisor in the Cascades who named thousands of natural features. Other peaks in the immediate vicinity named by Sylvester after poets include Irving Peak, Poe Mountain, Longfellow Mountain, and Bryant Peak.

== Geology ==
The North Cascades feature some of the most rugged topography in the Cascade Range with craggy peaks, spires, ridges, and deep glacial valleys. Geological events occurring many years ago created the diverse topography and drastic elevation changes over the Cascade Range leading to the various climate differences.

The history of the formation of the Cascade Mountains dates back millions of years ago to the late Eocene Epoch. With the North American Plate overriding the Pacific Plate, episodes of volcanic igneous activity persisted. Glacier Peak, a stratovolcano that is 12 mi (19 km) north of Whittier Peak, began forming in the mid-Pleistocene. Due to Glacier Peak's proximity to Whittier Peak, volcanic ash is common in the area. In addition, small fragments of the oceanic and continental lithosphere called terranes created the North Cascades about 50 million years ago.

During the Pleistocene period dating back over two million years ago, glaciation advancing and retreating repeatedly scoured and shaped the landscape. Uplift and faulting in combination with glaciation have been the dominant processes which have created the tall peaks and deep valleys of the North Cascades area.

== Climate ==
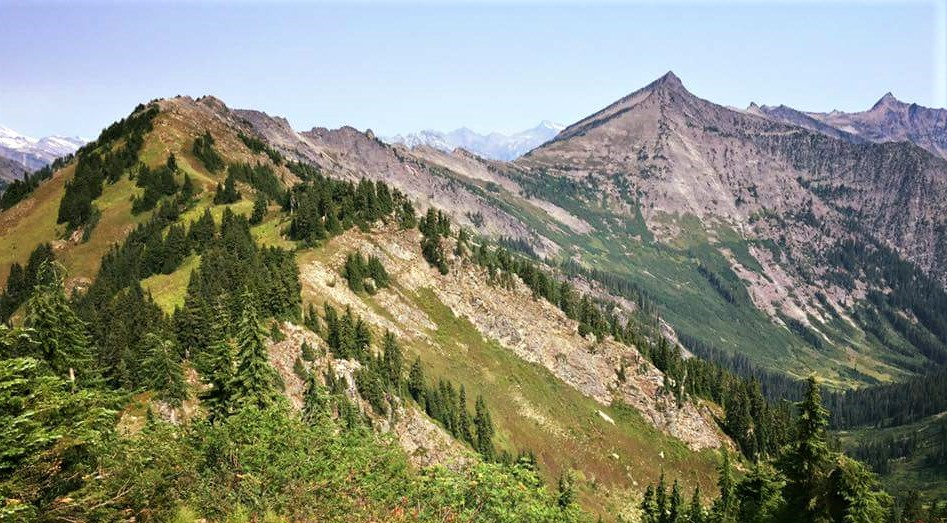
Whittier Peak (right) from Poe Mountain

Whittier Peak is located in the marine west coast climate zone of western North America. Weather fronts originating in the Pacific Ocean travel northeast toward the Cascade Mountains. As fronts approach the North Cascades, they are forced upward by the peaks of the Cascade Range, causing them to drop their moisture in the form of rain or snow onto the Cascades (Orographic lift). As a result, the west side of the North Cascades experiences high precipitation, especially during the winter months in the form of snowfall. Because of maritime influence, snow tends to be wet and heavy, resulting in high avalanche danger. During winter months, weather is usually cloudy, but, due to high pressure systems over the Pacific Ocean that intensify during summer months, there is often little or no cloud cover during the summer. Due to its temperate climate and proximity to the Pacific Ocean, areas west of the Cascade Crest very rarely experience temperatures below 0 °F (−18 °C) or above 80 °F (27 °C).

== See also ==
- List of mountain peaks of Washington (state)
