= Johnson Township, Clark County, Illinois =

Johnson Township
- Township
- Location in Clark County

- Clark County's location in Illinois
- Coordinates: 39°12′49″N 87°57′12″W
- Country: United States
- State: Illinois
- County: Clark
- Established: November 7, 1854

Area
  - Total: 36.56 sq mi (94.7 km^{2})
  - Land: 36.46 sq mi (94.4 km^{2})
  - Water: 0.1 sq mi (0.26 km^{2}) 0.27%
- Elevation: 590 ft (180 m)

Population (2020)
  - Total: 355
  - Density: 9.74/sq mi (3.76/km^{2})
- Time zone: UTC-6 (CST)
  - Summer (DST): UTC-5 (CDT)
- ZIP codes: 62420, 62442, 62449
- FIPS code: 17-023-38505

Johnson Township is one of fifteen townships in Clark County, Illinois, USA. As of the 2020 census, its population was 355 and it contained 154 housing units.

== Geography ==
According to the 2010 census, the township has a total area of 36.56 square miles (94.7 km^{2}), of which 36.46 square miles (94.4 km^{2}) (or 99.73%) is land and 0.1 square miles (0.26 km^{2}) (or 0.27%) is water.

=== Unincorporated towns ===
(This list is based on USGS data and may include former settlements.)

=== Cemeteries ===
The township contains these seven cemeteries: Baughman, Mound, Restitution, Walnut, Partlow, Old Slusser, and Slusser.

=== Major highways ===
- Illinois Route 49

== Demographics ==
As of the 2020 census there were 355 people, 121 households, and 101 families residing in the township. The population density was 9.71 inhabitants per square mile (3.75/km^{2}). There were 154 housing units at an average density of 4.21 per square mile (1.63/km^{2}). The racial makeup of the township was 96.06% White, 0.00% African American, 0.00% Native American, 0.28% Asian, 0.00% Pacific Islander, 0.00% from other races, and 3.66% from two or more races. Hispanic or Latino of any race were 0.56% of the population.

There were 121 households, out of which 25.60% had children under the age of 18 living with them, 76.86% were married couples living together, none had a female householder with no spouse present, and 16.53% were non-families. 16.50% of all households were made up of individuals, and 7.40% had someone living alone who was 65 years of age or older. The average household size was 2.45 and the average family size was 2.73.

The township's age distribution consisted of 23.6% under the age of 18, 4.7% from 18 to 24, 22.6% from 25 to 44, 36.9% from 45 to 64, and 12.2% who were 65 years of age or older. The median age was 44.4 years. For every 100 females, there were 104.1 males. For every 100 females age 18 and over, there were 117.3 males.

The median income for a household in the township was $68,750, and the median income for a family was $86,442. Males had a median income of $51,750 versus $21,875 for females. The per capita income for the township was $29,784. About 17.8% of families and 13.2% of the population were below the poverty line, including 0.0% of those under age 18 and 25.0% of those age 65 or over.

Historical population
Census	Pop.	Note	%±
2010	383		—
2020	355		−7.3%
U.S. Decennial Census

== School districts ==
- Casey-Westfield Community Unit School District 4c
- Martinsville Community Unit School District 3c

== Political districts ==
- Illinois' 15th congressional district
- State House District 109
- State Senate District 55
