= Johnson Township, Christian County, Illinois =

Johnson Township
- Township
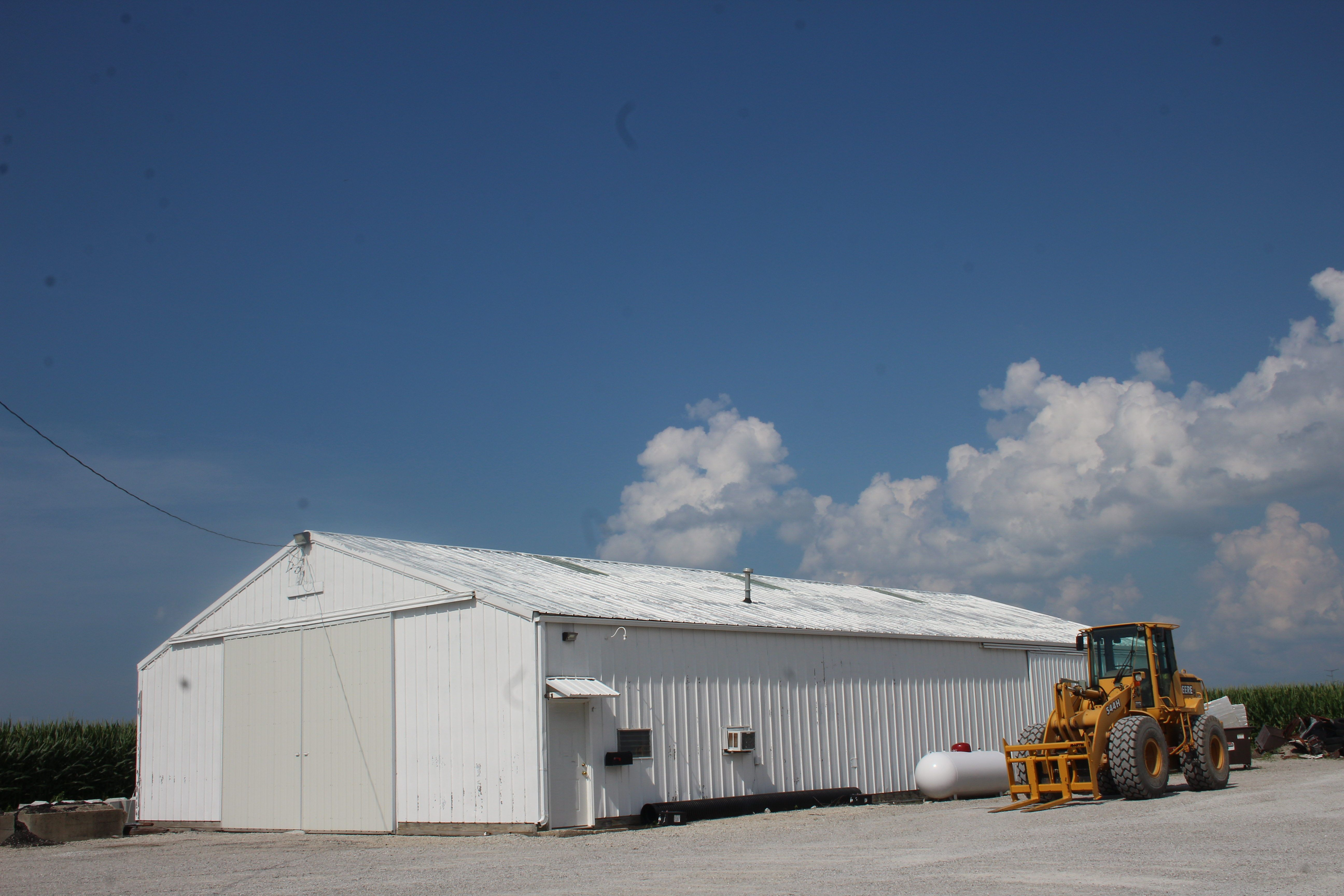
- Johnson Township government building

- Location in Christian County

- Christian County's location in Illinois
- Coordinates: 39°29′02″N 89°18′49″W
- Country: United States
- State: Illinois
- County: Christian
- Established: November 7, 1865

Area
  - Total: 37.26 sq mi (96.5 km^{2})
  - Land: 35.63 sq mi (92.3 km^{2})
  - Water: 1.63 sq mi (4.2 km^{2}) 4.37%
- Elevation: 620 ft (189 m)

Population (2020)
  - Total: 798
  - Density: 22.4/sq mi (8.65/km^{2})
- Time zone: UTC-6 (CST)
  - Summer (DST): UTC-5 (CDT)
- ZIP codes: 62555, 62556, 62568
- FIPS code: 17-021-38492

Johnson Township is one of seventeen townships in Christian County, Illinois, USA. As of the 2020 census, its population was 798 and it contained 306 housing units.

== Geography ==
According to the 2010 census, the township has a total area of 37.26 square miles (96.5 km^{2}), of which 35.63 square miles (92.3 km^{2}) (or 95.63%) is land and 1.63 square miles (4.2 km^{2}) (or 4.37%) is water.

=== Cities, towns, villages ===
- Taylorville (partial)

=== Cemeteries ===
The township contains these three cemeteries: Anderson, Brush Creek and Mound Chapel United Brethren.

=== Major highways ===
- Illinois Route 48

== Demographics ==
Historical population
Census	Pop.	Note	%±
1870	640		—
1880	1,084		69.4%
1890	983		−9.3%
1900	937		−4.7%
1910	838		−10.6%
1920	801		−4.4%
1930	614		−23.3%
1940	669		9.0%
1950	615		−8.1%
1960	540		−12.2%
1970	426		−21.1%
1980	607		42.5%
1990	565		−6.9%
2000	680		20.4%
2010	673		−1.0%
2020	798		18.6%
U.S. Decennial Census

As of the 2020 census there were 798 people, 239 households, and 200 families residing in the township. The population density was 21.42 inhabitants per square mile (8.27/km^{2}). There were 306 housing units at an average density of 8.21 per square mile (3.17/km^{2}). The racial makeup of the township was 91.85% White, 0.63% African American, 0.25% Native American, 0.75% Asian, 0.00% Pacific Islander, 0.38% from other races, and 6.14% from two or more races. Hispanic or Latino of any race were 1.25% of the population.

There were 239 households, out of which 25.90% had children under the age of 18 living with them, 73.22% were married couples living together, 0.84% had a female householder with no spouse present, and 16.32% were non-families. 16.30% of all households were made up of individuals, and 6.30% had someone living alone who was 65 years of age or older. The average household size was 2.08 and the average family size was 2.17.

The township's age distribution consisted of 11.2% under the age of 18, 11.0% from 18 to 24, 17.6% from 25 to 44, 36.4% from 45 to 64, and 23.7% who were 65 years of age or older. The median age was 56.2 years. For every 100 females, there were 111.0 males. For every 100 females age 18 and over, there were 113.5 males.

The median income for a household in the township was $90,139, and the median income for a family was $102,609. Males had a median income of $51,696 versus $31,069 for females. The per capita income for the township was $42,529. No families and 5.0% of the population were below the poverty line, including 44.6% of those under age 18 and none of those age 65 or over.

== School districts ==
- Taylorville Community Unit School District 3

== Political districts ==
- State House District 98
- State Senate District 49
