= Mont and Harriet Johnson House =

Historic house in Utah, United States

- U.S. National Register of Historic Places
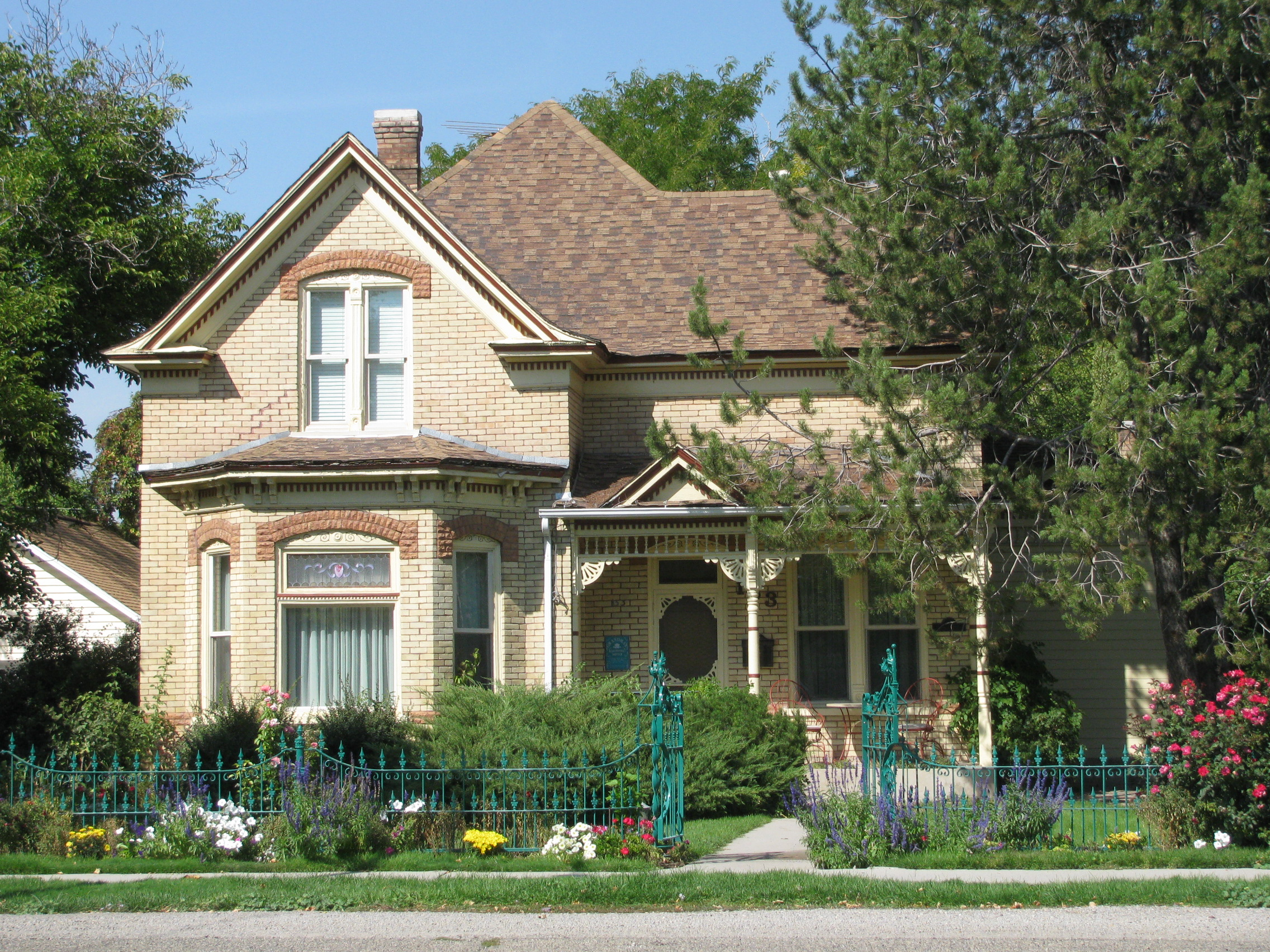

- Location within Utah Location within the United States
- Location: 153 E 400 N, Springville, Utah
- Coordinates: 40°10′22″N 111°36′25″W
- Area: 0.2 acres (0.081 ha)
- Built: 1901
- Built by: Reynolds, Charley (carpenter)
- Architectural style: Late Victorian
- MPS: Springville MPS
- NRHP reference No.: 97001570
- Added to NRHP: January 5, 1998

The Mont and Harriet Johnson House, at 153 E 400 N in Springville, Utah, United States, is a Late Victorian-style house built in 1901. It was listed on the National Register of Historic Places in 1998. The listing included three contributing buildings.

It was built for Mont Johnson, a successful farmer who was prominent in Springville, who in fact was serving as mayor during 1900 to 1902, while the house was built. He later served as treasurer of Utah County. This house was grander than most previous buildings in the city, and was made of fired brick.
