= Harriston =

Harriston may refer to:

- Harriston, Cumbria, England
- Harriston, Ontario, Canada
- Harriston, Missouri, United States
