= Missoula Valley =

Valley in Montana, United States

- Missoula-Hellgate Valley, Hellgate Valley
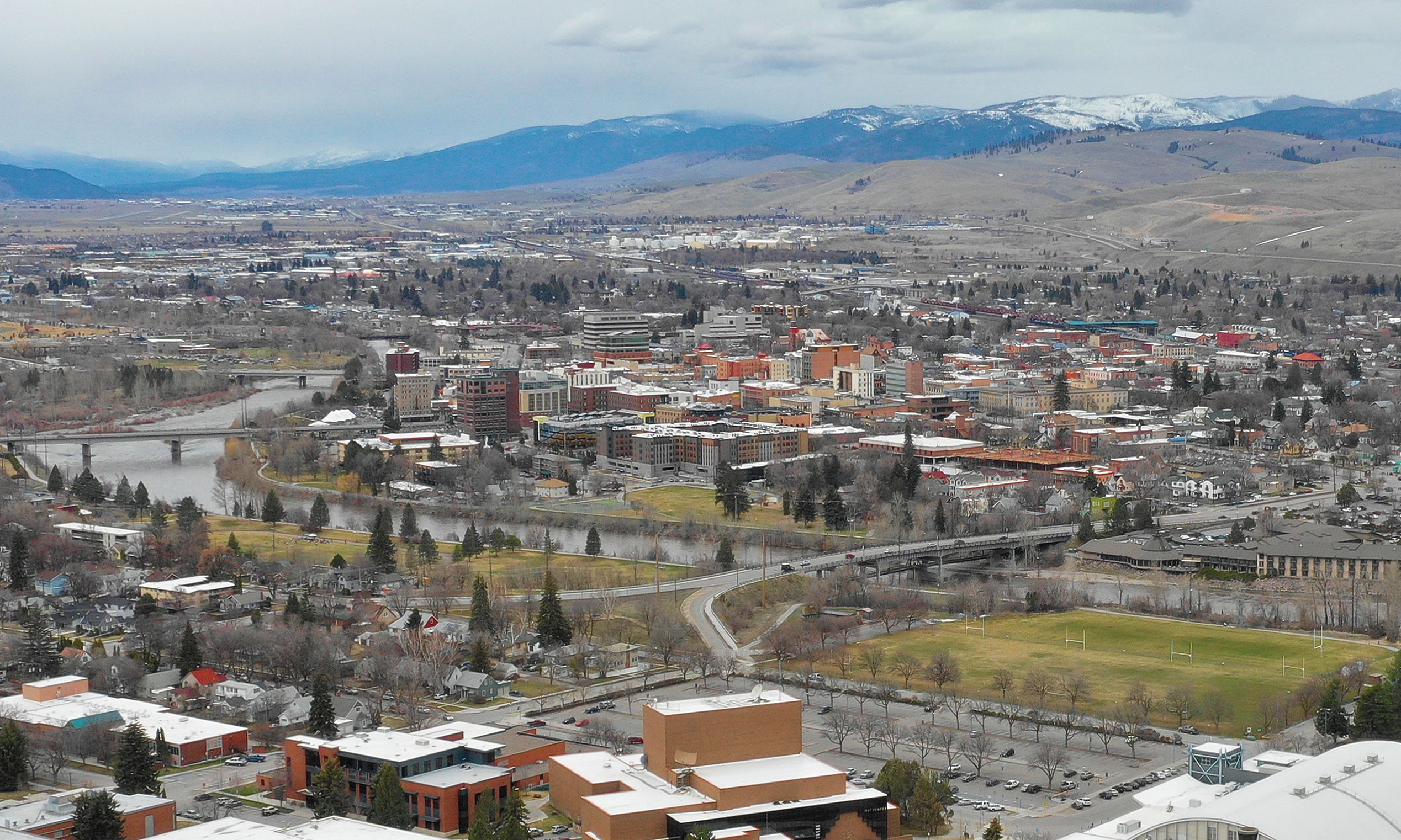
- Missoula, Montana in the Missoula Valley
- Floor elevation: 3,209 ft (978 m)

Geography
- Country: United States
- State: Montana
- District: Missoula County
- Population center: Missoula
- River: Clark Fork, Bitteroot River

Location
- Interactive map of Missoula Valley

The Missoula Valley, also known as the Missoula-Hellgate Valley or just Hellgate Valley, is a river valley in Missoula County, Montana. The valley includes the city of Missoula and is surrounded by five other valleys and several mountain ranges.

== History ==
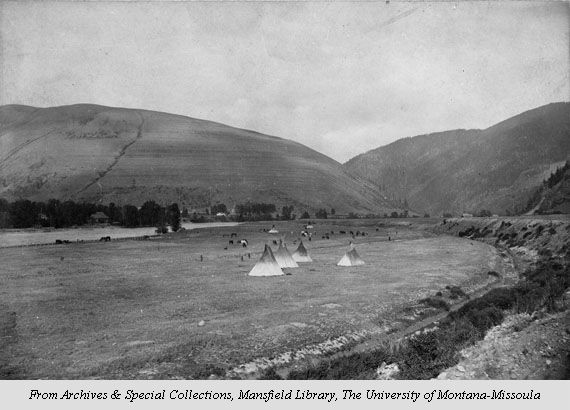
Teepees at the site of Missoula, south of the Clark Fork River, facing northeast

Archaeological artifacts date the earliest inhabitants of the Missoula Valley to 12,000 years ago, with settlements as early as 3500 BCE. From the 1700s until the 1850s, those who used the land were primarily the Salish, Kootenai, Pend d'Oreille, Blackfeet, and Shoshone people. Located at the confluence of five mountain valleys, the Missoula Valley was heavily traversed by local and distant native tribes that periodically went to the Eastern Montana plains in search of bison. This led to conflicts. The narrow valley at Missoula's eastern entrance was so strewn with human bones from repeated ambushes that French fur trappers later referred to this area as Porte de l'Enfer, translated as "Gate of Hell". Hell Gate would remain the name of the area until it was renamed "Missoula" in 1866.

The Lewis and Clark Expedition brought the first U.S. citizens to the area. They twice stopped just south of Missoula at Traveler's Rest. They camped there the first time on their westbound trip in September 1805. When they stayed there again, on their return in June–July 1806, Clark left heading south along the Bitterroot River and Lewis traveled north, then east, through Hellgate Canyon. In 1860, Hell Gate Village was established 5 miles (8 km) west of present-day downtown by Christopher P. Higgins and Frank Worden as a trading post to serve travelers on the recently completed Mullan Road, the first wagon road to cross the Rocky Mountains to the inland of the Pacific Northwest. The desire for a more convenient water supply to power a lumber and flour mill led to the movement of the settlement to its modern location in 1864.

The Missoula Mills replaced Hell Gate Village as the economic power of the valley and replaced it as the county seat in 1866. The name "Missoula" came from the Salish name for the Clark Fork River, nmesuletkw, which roughly translates as "place of frozen water". Fort Missoula was established in 1877 to help protect further arriving settlers. Growth accelerated with the arrival of the Northern Pacific Railway in 1883, and by charter, Missoula incorporated a municipal government as a town, the same year. In 1885, Missoula reincorporated its government as a city.

In 1893, Missoula was chosen as the location for the first state university, the University of Montana. The need for lumber for the railway and its bridges spurred the opening of multiple saw mills in the area, and in turn, the beginning of Missoula's lumber industry, which remained the mainstay of the area economy for the next 100 years. The United States Forest Service work in Missoula began in 1905. Missoula is also home of the smokejumpers' headquarters and will be the site of the National Museum of Forest Service History. Nationally, there are nine Forest Service regions; Region 1 is headquartered in Missoula.

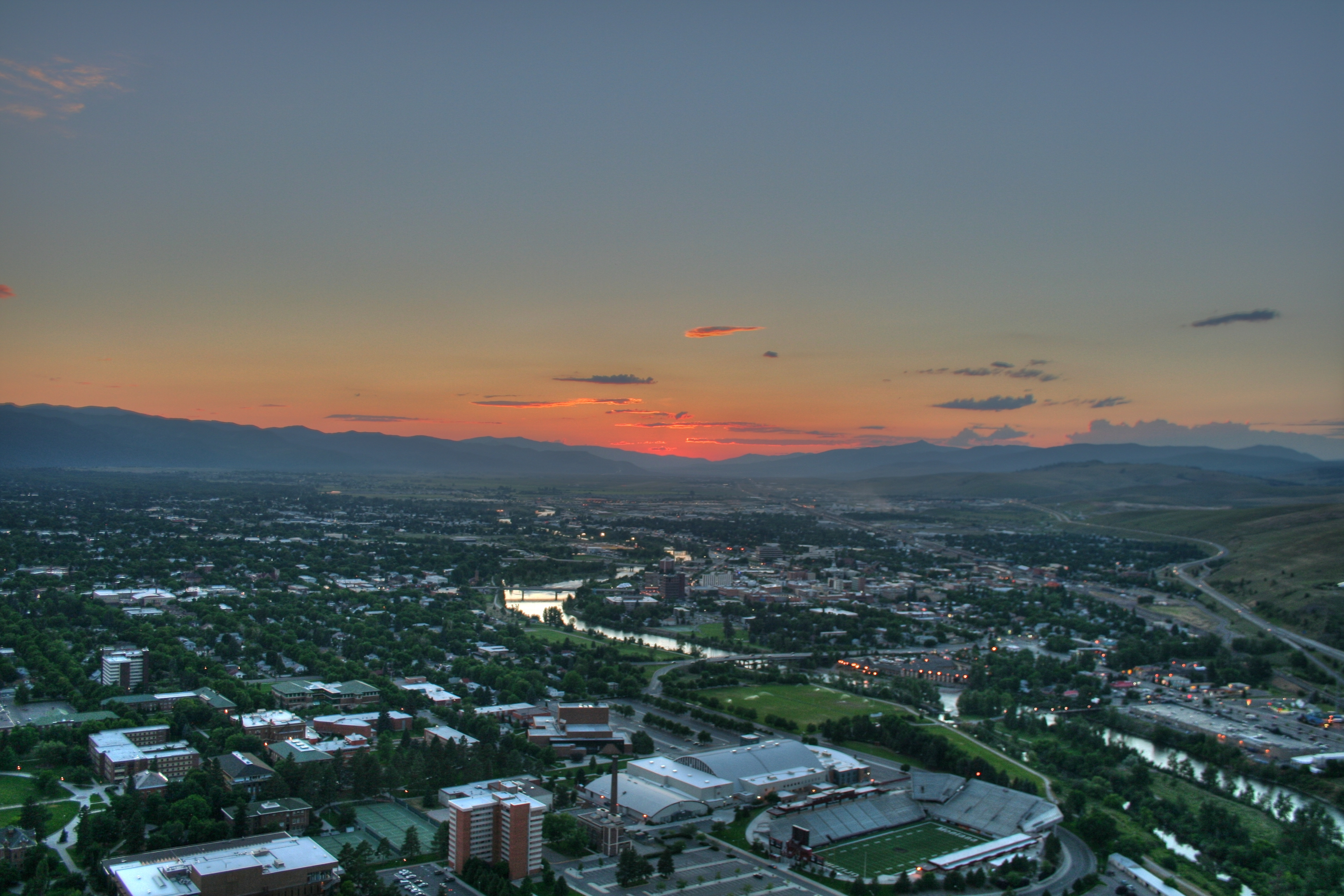
View of downtown from Mt. Sentinel

Logging remained a mainstay of industry in Missoula with the groundbreaking of the Hoerner-Waldorf pulp mill in 1956, which resulted in protests over the resultant air pollution. An article in Life 13 years later speaks of Missoulians sometimes needing to drive with headlights on during the day to navigate through the smog. In 1979, almost 40% of the county labor income still came from the wood and paper-products sector. The lumber industry was hit hard by the recession of the early 1980s, and Missoula's economy began to diversify. By the early 1990s, the disappearance of many of the region's log yards, along with legislation, had helped clean the air dramatically.

In 1883, the Northern Pacific Railroad arrived in Missoula, spurring rapid growth in the town, which by then had about 500 residents.

In March 1970, the Northern Pacific, along with three other closely affiliated railroads (Chicago, Burlington & Quincy, Great Northern and Spokane, Portland & Seattle) merged to form Burlington Northern.

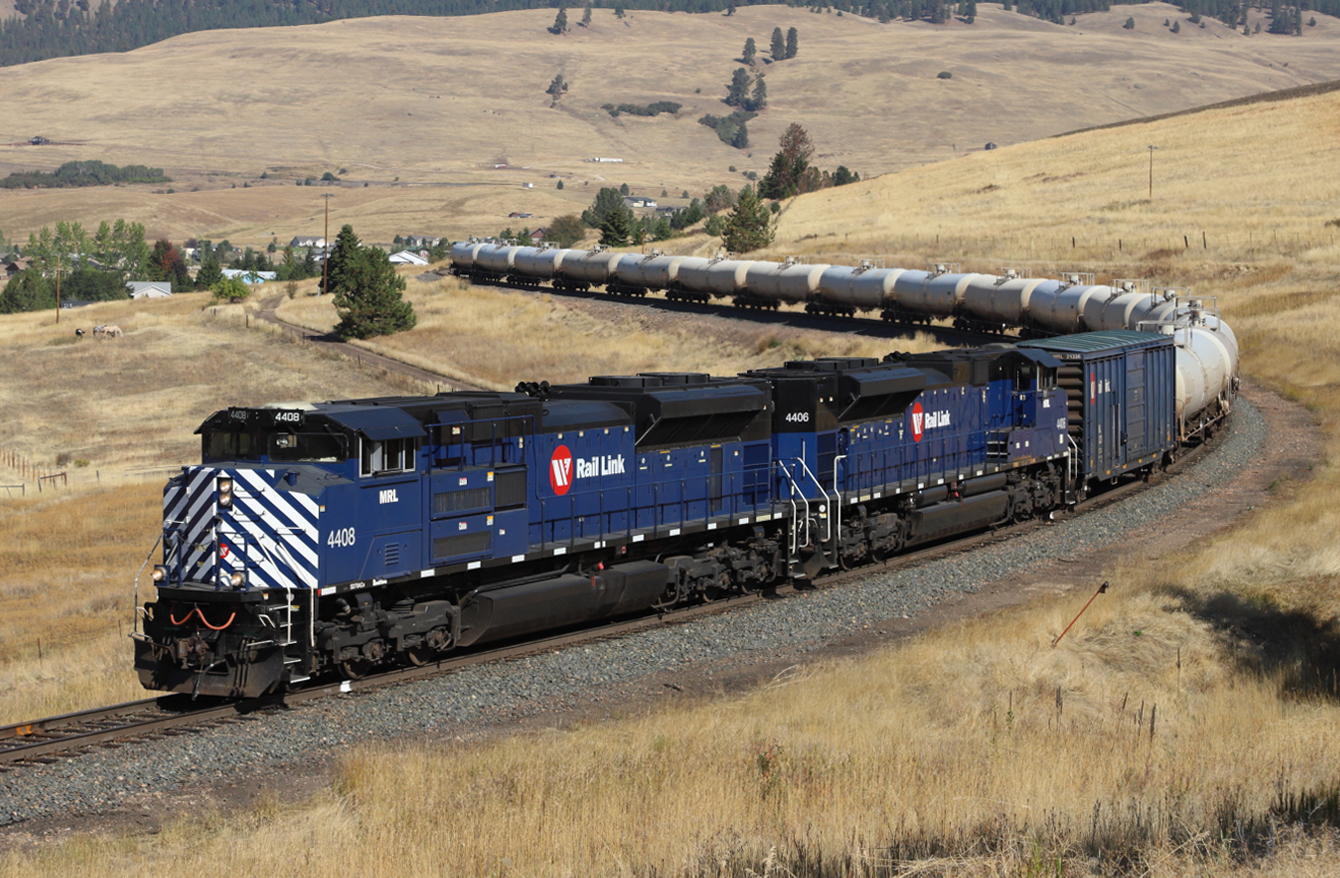
A Montana Rail Link oil train. Until January 2024, when BNSF resumed operations on the tracks formerly leased to MRL, the defunct company had its headquarters in Missoula.

In 1987, BN decided to lease, for an initial term of 60 years, the ex-NP route to entrepreneur Dennis Washington, who formed Montana Rail Link. MRL established its headquarters in Missoula.

== Climate ==
Missoula has a humid continental climate (Köppen climate classification Dfb), with cold and moderately snowy winters, hot and dry summers, and short, crisp springs and autumns. Winters are usually milder than much of the rest of the state due to Missoula's location west of the Rockies, allowing it to receive mild, moist Pacific air and avoid the worst of cold snaps; however, it also gets more precipitation in winter. Winter snowfall averages 39.5 inches (100 cm), typically occurring between October 30 and April 20, with an annual average of 120 days of snow on the ground. As with the rest of the state, summers are very sunny, and the average diurnal temperature variation is more than 30 °F (17 °C) from late June through late September, due to the relative aridity. The monthly daily average temperature ranges from 23.9 °F (−4.5 °C) in December to 68.6 °F (20.3 °C) in July. On average, annually, there are 24 days with temperatures at or above 90 °F (32 °C), 45 days where the temperature does not rise above freezing, and 7.8 days with temperatures reaching at or below 0 °F (−18 °C). Record temperatures range from −33 °F (−36 °C) on January 26, 1957, up to 107 °F (42 °C), most recently on June 30, 2021; the record cold maximum is −13 °F (−25 °C), last recorded on February 2, 1989, while, conversely, the record warm minimum is 72 °F (22 °C) on July 27, 1939.

Climate data for Missoula, Montana (Missoula Airport) (1991-2020 normals, (Note: Mean monthly maxima and minima (i.e. the expected highest and lowest temperature readings at any point during the year or given month) calculated based on data at said location from 1991 to 2020.) extremes 1893–present)
Month	Jan	Feb	Mar	Apr	May	Jun	Jul	Aug	Sep	Oct	Nov	Dec	Year
Record high °F (°C)	60 (16)	66 (19)	78 (26)	90 (32)	95 (35)	102 (39)	107 (42)	105 (41)	99 (37)	85 (29)	73 (23)	67 (19)	107 (42)
Mean maximum °F (°C)	47.9 (8.8)	51.3 (10.7)	65.2 (18.4)	75.6 (24.2)	84.9 (29.4)	90.9 (32.7)	98.0 (36.7)	97.3 (36.3)	89.8 (32.1)	75.3 (24.1)	58.5 (14.7)	47.2 (8.4)	99.6 (37.6)
Mean daily maximum °F (°C)	31.6 (−0.2)	37.0 (2.8)	47.9 (8.8)	56.1 (13.4)	66.2 (19.0)	73.2 (22.9)	85.4 (29.7)	84.3 (29.1)	72.6 (22.6)	55.7 (13.2)	39.9 (4.4)	30.9 (−0.6)	56.7 (13.7)
Daily mean °F (°C)	24.8 (−4.0)	29.0 (−1.7)	37.4 (3.0)	44.2 (6.8)	53.0 (11.7)	59.7 (15.4)	68.4 (20.2)	67.2 (19.6)	57.5 (14.2)	44.1 (6.7)	32.3 (0.2)	24.4 (−4.2)	45.2 (7.3)
Mean daily minimum °F (°C)	18.0 (−7.8)	20.9 (−6.2)	26.8 (−2.9)	32.3 (0.2)	39.8 (4.3)	46.3 (7.9)	51.5 (10.8)	50.1 (10.1)	42.4 (5.8)	32.4 (0.2)	24.6 (−4.1)	17.8 (−7.9)	33.6 (0.9)
Mean minimum °F (°C)	−3.7 (−19.8)	1.9 (−16.7)	12.2 (−11.0)	21.9 (−5.6)	27.6 (−2.4)	34.9 (1.6)	41.4 (5.2)	40.2 (4.6)	30.1 (−1.1)	16.9 (−8.4)	8.5 (−13.1)	−1.5 (−18.6)	−10.9 (−23.8)
Record low °F (°C)	−33 (−36)	−28 (−33)	−13 (−25)	2 (−17)	21 (−6)	26 (−3)	27 (−3)	25 (−4)	15 (−9)	−7 (−22)	−23 (−31)	−30 (−34)	−33 (−36)
Average precipitation inches (mm)	0.96 (24)	0.88 (22)	0.92 (23)	1.36 (35)	1.77 (45)	2.14 (54)	0.85 (22)	0.83 (21)	0.96 (24)	1.18 (30)	1.18 (30)	1.08 (27)	14.11 (358)
Average snowfall inches (cm)	9.9 (25)	8.5 (22)	5.0 (13)	1.3 (3.3)	0.3 (0.76)	0.0 (0.0)	0 (0)	0 (0)	0.1 (0.25)	0.9 (2.3)	5.4 (14)	11.6 (29)	43.0 (109)
Average precipitation days (≥ 0.01 in)	12.5	10.8	11.4	11.4	12.1	12.5	6.0	6.4	7.3	9.9	11.1	12.6	124.0
Average snowy days (≥ 0.1 in)	9.7	8.1	4.9	1.5	0.3	0.1	0.0	0.0	0.1	0.8	5.2	9.5	40.2
Average relative humidity (%)	81.3	78.1	70.3	61.2	61.7	61.1	51.7	52.5	62.8	70.8	80.2	83.5	67.9
Average dew point °F (°C)	17.2 (−8.2)	21.7 (−5.7)	25.3 (−3.7)	29.7 (−1.3)	37.2 (2.9)	44.4 (6.9)	45.7 (7.6)	44.4 (6.9)	39.7 (4.3)	32.7 (0.4)	25.9 (−3.4)	18.7 (−7.4)	31.9 (−0.1)
Mean monthly sunshine hours	95.8	133.0	209.3	245.0	280.5	311.1	389.3	334.8	264.7	194.3	99.5	82.9	2,640.2
Percentage possible sunshine	34	46	57	60	60	66	81	76	70	58	35	31	59
Source: NOAA

== Geography ==
=== Surrounding features ===
The Missoula Valley is a hub for five other valleys nearby. They include the Clark Fork Valley to the west, Flathead Valley to the north, Blackfoot Valley to the northeast, Deerlodge Valley to the east and the Bitteroot Valley to the south. Additionally, the valley is also a hub for five mountain ranges- the Bitteroot Range, Rattlesnake Mountains, Saphire Mountains, Garnet Range, and the Reservation Divide. Through the middle of the valley is the Clark Fork River, although it begins on the east edge of the valley. Also on the east edge of the valley is the Hellgate Canyon, Mount Jumbo and University Mountain. On the south edge of valley is the Bitterroot River, which flows into the Clark Fork River on the southwest edge of the valley. On the north edge is Rattlesnake Creek and Grant Creek.

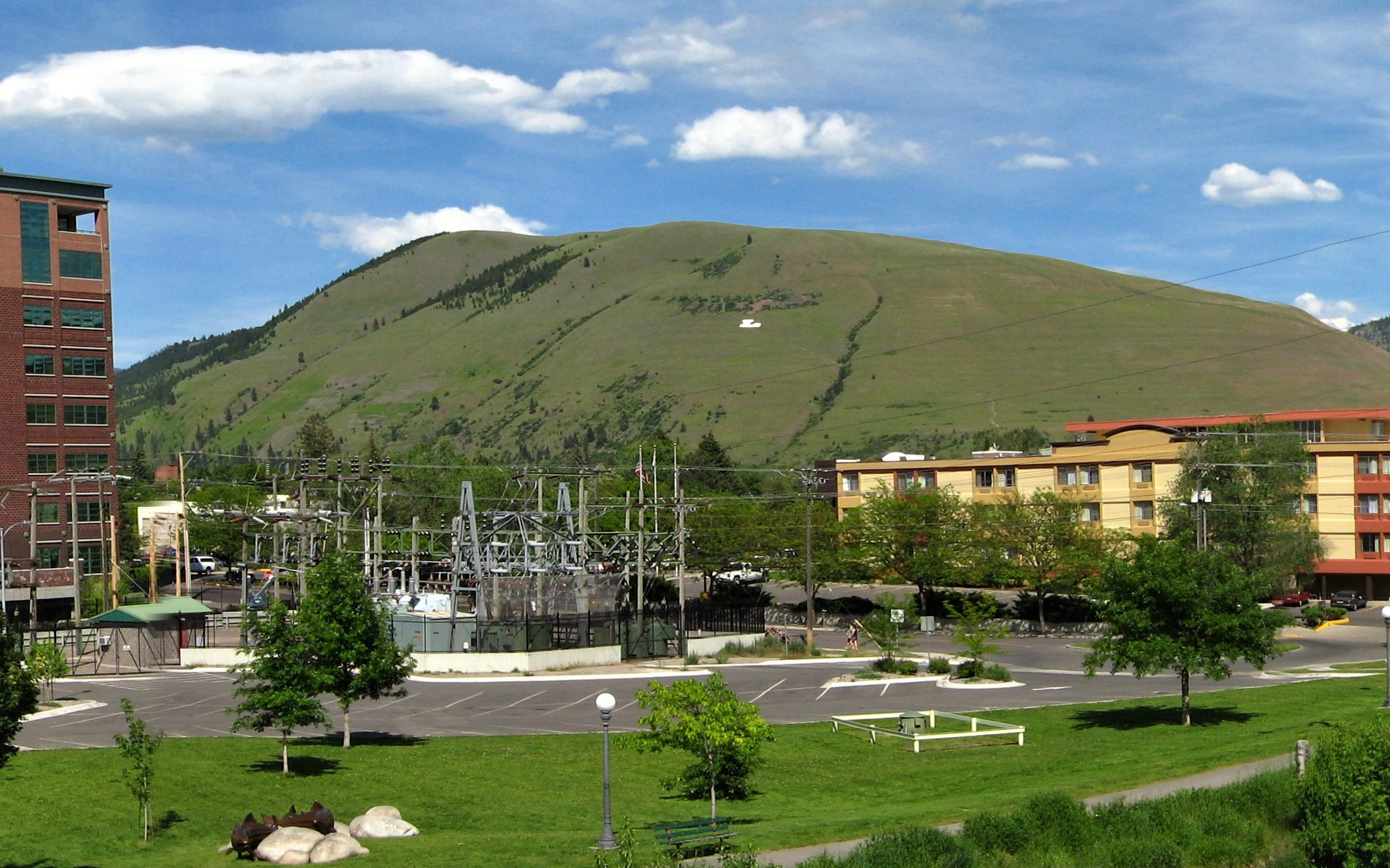
Mount Jumbo in Missoula

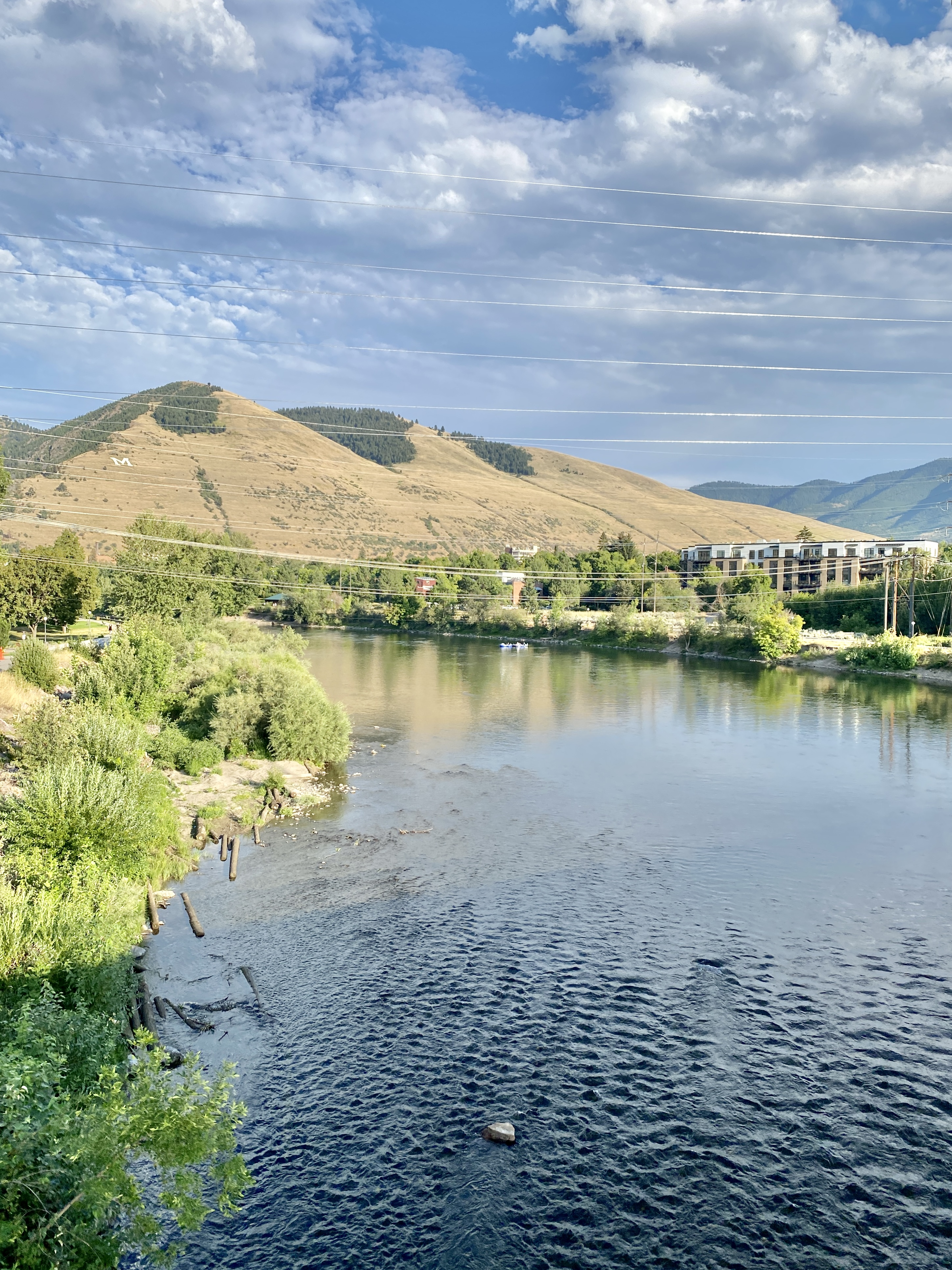
The Clark Fork River in Missoula

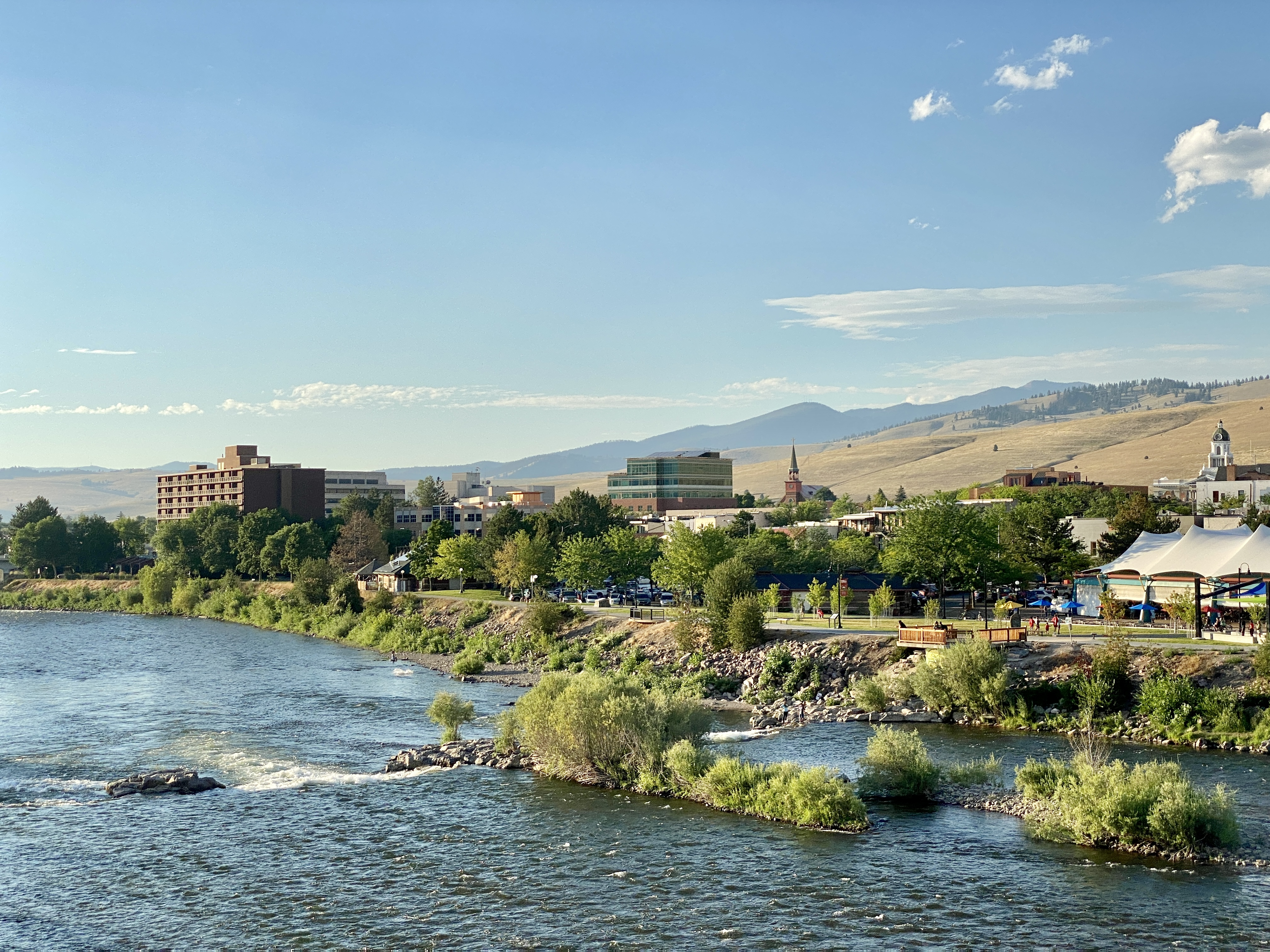
The Clark Fork River as it flows through Missoula

=== Valley formation ===
Where Missoula and the Missoula Valley sits now used to be the bottom of Glacial Lake Missoula. The gigantic glacial lake was formed from an ice dam somewhere in present-day Idaho around 22,000 years ago. However, the dam did not stay for long, which gave out and caused the Missoula Floods. This process repeated several times, allowing water to both be soaked up into the present day valley and put back in the lake. Afterwards, the floods did stop, leaving small amounts of water left on the surface, but loads of groundwater. More recently, the water left over caused nearby Clark Fork River and Bitteroot River to form. The two rivers, along with weathering and the removal of rocks allowed for the Missoula Valley to take shape.

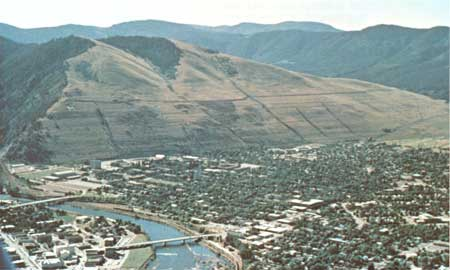
Shoreline of Lake Missoula on University Mountain

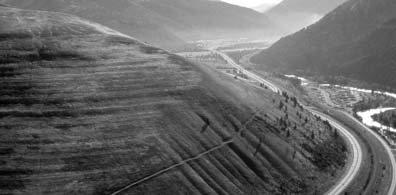
Shoreline from Glacial Lake Missoula on the hills above Missoula

=== Rock formations ===
As a result of huge and similar rock deposits from the Missoula Floods, the Missoula Valley consists of generally the same rocks and are in a group called the Missoula Group. The main rocks are the argilities, quartzites, sandstones. There are some minor beds filled with conglomerate, limestone, and calcareous shale. The Missoula Valley also generally contains rocks from the Boulder Pass Formation and Precambrian time period.

== Communities ==
=== City ===
- Missoula

=== Census-designated places ===
- Frenchtown
- Huson
- Orchard Homes
- Wye

=== Unincorporated communities ===
- Nagos
- Westview Park

== Recreation ==
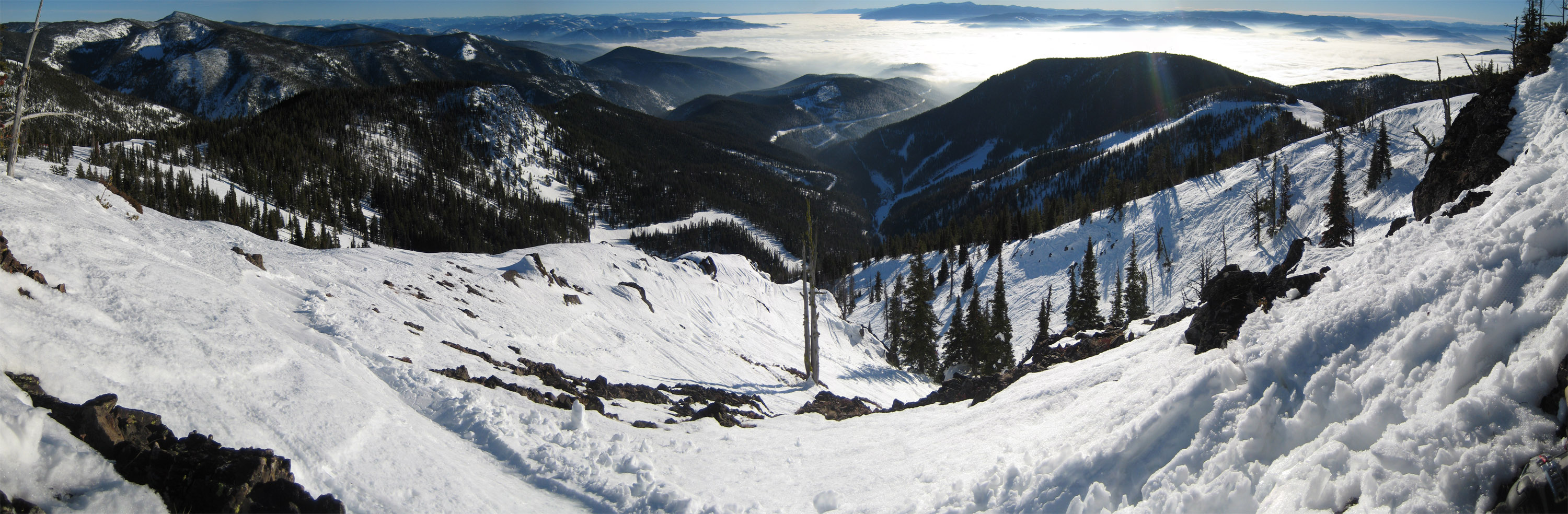
Snowbowl near Missoula, Montana

=== Year-round ===
In the summer, camping, fishing (especially fly fishing), hiking, biking, rafting/floating, and other activities based on rivers and streams. In the fall, hunting and some summer activities are popular choices. In the winter and spring, skiing, snowboarding and snowmobiling.

=== Annual events ===
Missoula has many events year round. Some examples include marathons and other races, safety classes, farmers markets and concerts.
