= Clark Fork =

Clark Fork or Clarks Fork may refer to several places:

== Populated places ==
- Clark Fork, Idaho
- Clarks Fork, Missouri
- Clark Fork Township, Cooper County, Missouri

== Streams ==
- Clark Fork (Petite Saline Creek), a stream in Missouri
- Clark Fork (river), a river in Idaho and Montana
- The Clarks Fork Yellowstone River in Montana and Wyoming
