= New Lebanon Cumberland Presbyterian Church and School =

Historic church in Missouri, United States

- U.S. National Register of Historic Places
- U.S. Historic district – Contributing property
- Location within Missouri Location within the United States
- Location: Route A, New Lebanon, Missouri
- Coordinates: 38°45′53″N 92°56′21″W
- Area: 1.7 acres (0.69 ha)
- Built: 1859
- Architectural style: Greek Revival
- NRHP reference No.: 79001359
- Added to NRHP: July 9, 1979

New Lebanon Cumberland Presbyterian Church and School is a historic Presbyterian church and school located on Route A in New Lebanon, Cooper County, Missouri. The church was built in 1859, and is a one-story, brick building with restrained Greek Revival style detailing. The cross-gable roof is topped by a small clapboarded belfry. The school is a small one-story frame building sheathed in clapboard.

It was listed on the National Register of Historic Places in 1979. It is located in the New Lebanon Historic District.
