= New Lebanon Historic District =

Historic district in Missouri, United States

- U.S. National Register of Historic Places
- U.S. Historic district
- Location within Missouri Location within the United States
- Location: Roughly, Area W and SE of jct of MO A and New Lebanon Loop, New Lebanon, Missouri
- Coordinates: 38°46′28″N 92°56′21″W
- Area: 5.6 acres (2.3 ha)
- Architectural style: Queen Anne
- NRHP reference No.: 98000597
- Added to NRHP: June 11, 1998

New Lebanon Historic District is a national historic district located at New Lebanon, Cooper County, Missouri.

The district encompasses five contributing buildings in the central business district of New Lebanon. It developed between about 1860 and 1947, and includes representative examples of Queen Anne style architecture.

The five contributing buildings are: the Abram "Abe" Rothgeb Store Building (1926) and three ancillary buildings associated with the store - a feed and oil shed, a tool and storage shed, and a two-story barn; and the Dr. Alfred E. Monroe House (1896).

Located in the district is the previously listed New Lebanon Cumberland Presbyterian Church and School.

It was listed on the National Register of Historic Places in 1998.
