= Pisgah, Missouri =

Unincorporated community in the US state of Missouri

Coordinates: 38°46′35″N 92°38′58″W

Pisgah is an unincorporated community in Cooper County, Missouri, United States. The community is located about two miles west of Pisgah Creek (a tributary of Moniteau Creek) on Missouri Route O and eleven miles north-northwest of California. Bunceton is about eight miles to the west on Missouri Route J.

== History ==
Pisgah was platted in 1830, taking its name from a local Baptist church of the same name. The name ultimately is derived from Mount Pisgah, a place mentioned in the Hebrew Bible. A post office called Pisgah was established in 1848, and remained in operation until 1910.
