= Clark Fork (Petite Saline Creek tributary) =

Stream in the U.S. state of Missouri

Clark Fork is a stream in Cooper County in the U.S. state of Missouri. It is a tributary of Petite Saline Creek.

The stream headwaters arise at 38°47′06″N 92°43′39″W at an elevation of approximately 877 feet just south of Missouri Route J and 3.5 miles east of Bunceton. The stream flows to the northeast and north passing under Missouri Route 87 approximately one mile northwest of the community of Clarks Fork. Its confluence with the Petite Saline Creek is at 38°55′21″N 92°40′07″W and an elevation of 597 feet. The confluence is approximately 4.5 miles southeast of Booneville.

Clark Fork bears the name of a pioneer settler.

== See also ==
- List of rivers of Missouri
