= Lone Elm, Cooper County, Missouri =

Unincorporated community in the US state of Missouri

Coordinates: 38°49′30″N 92°44′13″W

Lone Elm is an unincorporated community in Cooper County, in the U.S. state of Missouri. The community is located at the intersection of Missouri routes KK and B approximately eleven miles south of Boonville.

== History ==
A post office called Lone Elm was established in 1868, and remained in operation until 1906. The community was named for a large individual elm tree near the original town site.
