= Billingsville, Missouri =

Unincorporated community in Missouri, U.S.

Coordinates: 38°54′11″N 92°47′40″W

Billingsville is an unincorporated community in Cooper County, in the U.S. state of Missouri.

== History ==
Billingsville was laid out in 1860. The Billingsville post office closed in 1942.
