= New Lebanon, Missouri =

Unincorporated community in Missouri, U.S.

Coordinates: 38°45′50″N 92°56′22″W

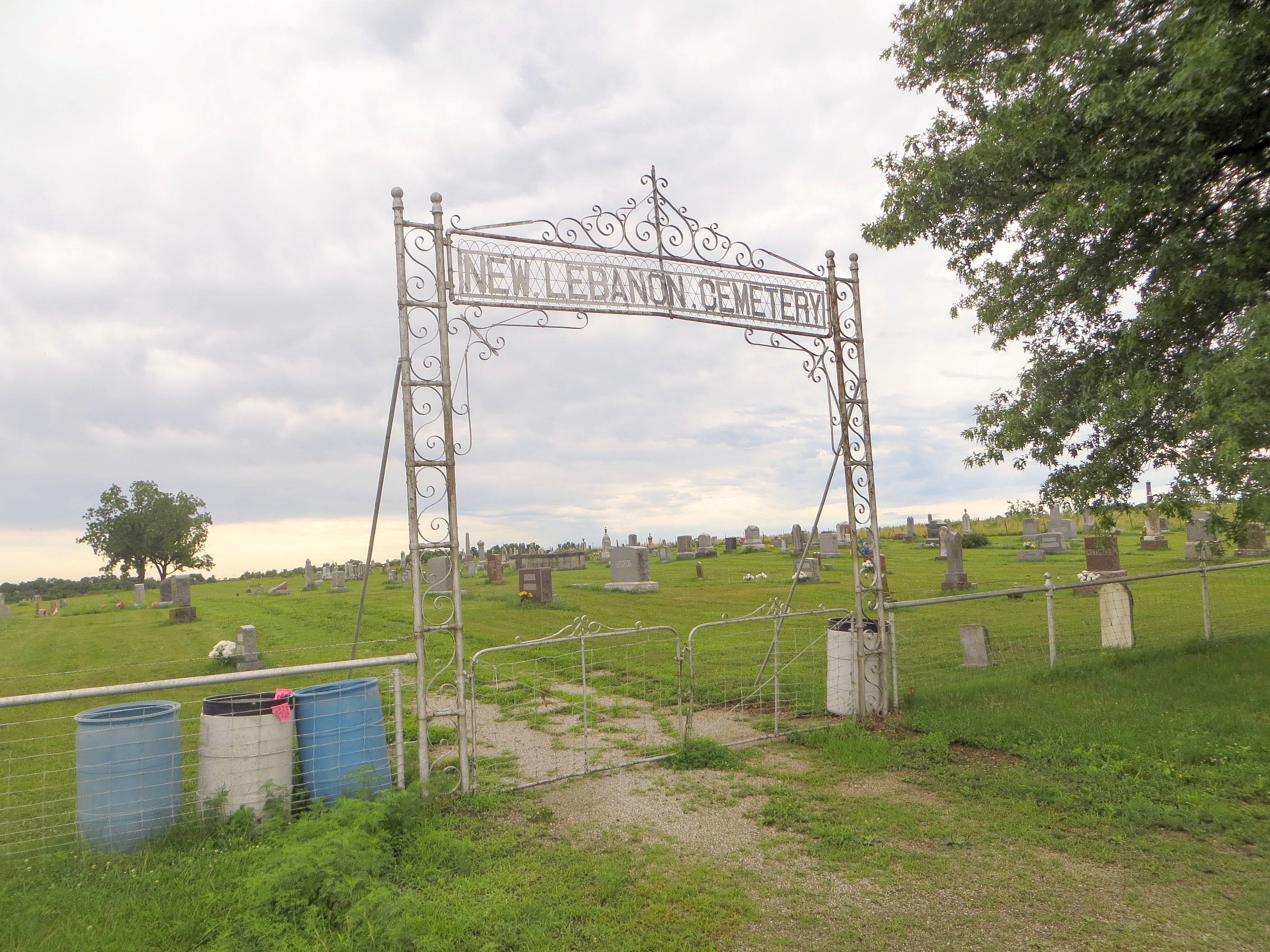
New Lebanon Cemetery

New Lebanon is an unincorporated community in Cooper County, in the U.S. state of Missouri. The community is on Missouri Route A between Otterville seven miles to the south and Pilot Grove seven miles to the north. The Lamine River flows past about two miles west of the community.

== History ==
A post office called New Lebanon was established in 1887, and remained in operation until 1906. The community took its name from the local New Lebanon Church.

New Lebanon Cumberland Presbyterian Church and School and New Lebanon Historic District are listed on the National Register of Historic Places.
