= Clarks Fork, Missouri =

Unincorporated community in Missouri, U.S.

Coordinates: 38°53′13″N 92°39′10″W

Clarks Fork is an unincorporated community in Cooper County, in the U.S. state of Missouri. The community is located on Missouri Route 87 approximately one mile southeast of the stream Clark Fork. Boonville is approximately seven miles to the northwest.

== History ==
A post office called Clarks Fork was established in 1841, and remained in operation until 1908. The community took its name from Clark Fork.
