= Harriston, Missouri =

Unincorporated community in Missouri, U.S.

Coordinates: 38°50′04″N 92°56′54″W

Harriston is an unincorporated community in Cooper County, in the U.S. state of Missouri. The community was located along the Missouri–Kansas–Texas Railroad line approximately three miles southwest of Pilot Grove.

== History ==
Harriston was laid out in 1873 by Dr. N. W. Harris, and named for him. A post office called Harriston was established in 1873, and remained in operation until 1908.
