= Harriston, Cumbria =

Hamlet in Cumbria, England

Coordinates: 54.763°N 3.307°W

Harriston
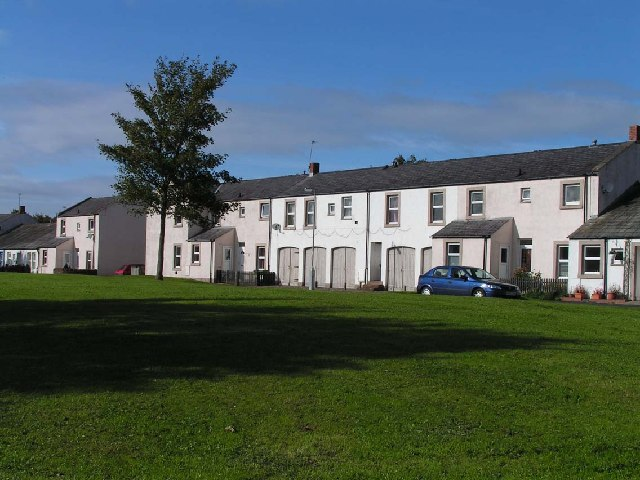
- Harriston

- Location within Cumbria
- OS grid reference: NY159416
- Civil parish: Aspatria
- Unitary authority: Cumberland
- Ceremonial county: Cumbria
- Region: North West
- Country: England
- Sovereign state: United Kingdom
- Post town: WIGTON
- Postcode district: CA7
- Dialling code: 016973
- Police: Cumbria
- Fire: Cumbria
- Ambulance: North West
- UK Parliament: Penrith and Solway

Harriston is a small hamlet in Cumbria, England, consisting of approximately 100 houses.

== Construction ==
When, in 1868, the trustees of the infant Joseph Harris sunk a colliery one mile to the south east of the town of Aspatria they were escalating their mining responsibilities. At that time the population of Aspatria numbered 1,100 and comprised 250 houses. Since the mine required a minimum of 200 workers, they had to recruit miners from outside the district and in consequence build houses to accommodate the new influx. They knew that through the provision of tied housing they could not only attract the right quality of worker but equally important, once employed retain their services. To this end they built a village with three streets comprising, 96 two-up and two-down terraced houses and aptly named it Harristown. Shortly afterwards this became Harriston.

== No. 3 Brayton domain colliery ==
After buying a parcel of Glebe land from Aspatria church for £750 the trustees sank a series of test bores to determine the economic feasibility of the coalfield; raising the first Coal on 12 August 1870. During its life the mine had three shafts; No 1, 176 metres deep to the Yard Band; No 2, 165 metres to the same seam; and No 3, 95 metres to the Ten-Quarters seam. The Royalties belonged to Sir Wilfrid Lawson and Lord Leconfield. Although the mine contained vast quantities of household quality coal the miners encountered many faults and harsh conditions in the early stages. At times they dragged coal distances of over 360 metres, performing work later undertaken by ponies. However, as the mine opened out the quality and quantity improved beyond all expectations and eventually demanded a very high price in the market place.

To extract coal the owner adopted the longwall system of mining. A method whereby the miners pushed the workings forward in a long continuous line and as they advanced they packed the goaf (the space left after the extraction of coal) with stone and slack on which to settle the roof. This system had three primary advantages; firstly, it was ideal for working thin seams; secondly, since it did not require pillars they could remove almost all of the coal; and thirdly, they could remove the coal in a single operation; and when undermined, the pressure of the strata above brought the roof down in large lumps. They extracted the coal from the goaf through gateways, which were normally 11 metres wide, supported on each side by walls of stone. Only in the gateways was height available for the movement of coal.

The mine came into full production in 1874, and continued to maintain a satisfactory output for over eight years; after which new explorations were required to guarantee continuous working. In 1882, Harris drove a dip drift a distance of 1,100 metres from the hauling engine to discover a new seam. In 1892, he completed a level drift 1,150 metres long and after three years of exploration he found a new seam. In addition to installing an air compressor at the bank to assist ventilation, he moved the hauling engine to the out-by end of the drift; and relocated the pump to extract the surplus water. The output increased to record levels, peaking at 600 tons for an 8.5-hour shift. In 1894, he attempted without success to expand the colliery in a southerly direction. The results of these modifications offered continual employment until 1902, when the mine became commercially exhausted.

In October 1904, a large gathering of villagers witnessed the dismantling of the two remaining chimneys. The work was executed by John Foster, foreman Joiner, under the superintendence of George Askew, Manager. Although no major disasters occurred in the thirty year life of the mine at least seventeen lives were lost as a direct result of injuries sustained at the workplace.

== Poor relations ==
Although the population of Harriston had risen to over 500 inhabitants by 1893, it continued to remain the poor relation when compared to Aspatria. Aspatria held the economic power; it collected the rates and returned little in the form of local government services. The major drawback related to the private ownership of the property. In 1896 Cumberland County Council refused to open an electoral polling station despite the ward contributing a substantial portion of the district rate. After the colliery closed the rateable value of the village fell and in consequence Harriston's needs became almost totally ignored. To reach Aspatria, villagers had to walk almost a mile, along an unlit, unadopted track little more than 1.5 metres wide, often waterlogged during bad weather. Despite several petitions and many hours of political debate in the offices of the Urban District Council, little improved and forty years elapsed before the County Council finally adopted the road. The upkeep of the streets connecting the houses followed much later. Although situated adjacent to the Mealsgate branch railway, the residents were unable to secure an independent station and were forced to walk along the railway track to Aspatria station and vice versa to use the facility. When, in 1893, the Maryport and Carlisle Railway Company outlawed this custom the villagers had to take the 1.5-mile route via Aspatria. Despite several petitions and the support of Sir Wilfrid Lawson, the then chairman of the company, they could not alter this ruling. The village had no access to a postal dispatch box. In 1919 they presented a petition to the Post Master-General seeking the establishment of a sub post office; notwithstanding Aspatria having two such facilities, residents at Harriston had to continue buying their stamps and postal orders from the delivery postman.

However improvements gradually began to appear. The Aspatria and District Industrial Cooperative Society established a branch store. In 1904 the council replaced the solitary water pump that stood at the top of the village with a gravity fed water supply from the Overwater main. Although gas household illumination was available at Aspatria from 1859, and a new gasometer was erected in 1895, Harriston had to wait until 1910 before a supply reached the village. Similarly with electricity, available at Aspatria from 1932, finally reached Harriston in 1940. In 1913, the Harris family laid a bowling green on the site of the old pit yard and inaugurated a competitive club. In later years the council erected a children's play area, complete with swings and roundabouts. In 1952, the youngsters began their own Youth Club; an organisation ran by Harry Iredale, which in addition to indoor activities, offered cricket and football for boys, and netball for girls on land belonging to George Blackburn. After the mine closed Harris re-employed all of the colliers at No 4 pit. Although a considerable journey by road it was shorter by way of the fields. Harris struck up an agreement with the local landowners and cut a path across the land, a path later known as the 'Black Trod'.

In 1879, at personal expense, Harris constructed a large commodious building, which residents used through the week as an infants school, in the evenings a hall for temperance meetings and on Sundays a place of worship. In 1892, Harris opened the Harris Institute, a colliers club comprising reading, smoking and billiard rooms; a club where workers could enjoy their evenings playing games and reading newspapers away from public houses.

== Modern Development ==
In July 1974, Allerdale Borough Council took the extraordinary step of condemning the village in its entirety; and the houses many of which were owner occupied became the subject of a compulsory purchase order. The village with few proper bathrooms would have been razed to the ground had it not been for the efforts of a few local councillors. Instead it became the subject of a prestigious rebuild and a short residential relocation. The village was designed to echo the local architectural traditions of rendered and painted houses. Whilst some original materials such as slates and pavings were salvaged from the old village, most of the new building is in concrete. The entire load bearing superstructure of the new houses is of concrete blocks faced externally with a painted sand and cement roughcast rendering. Floor units, lintels and sills are of precast concrete.

Once completed the radical development became the subject of considerable media attention. The new Harriston contains the same number of houses as its predecessor, arranged around a traditional village green. When complete it contained a variety of dwellings, ranging from bungalows to family homes with three and four bedrooms. The new facilities included a village shop, allotments, garages and children's play areas. Only two of the original buildings remained, the old village hall became a modern village hall, while the old cooperative store became a small industrial unit. In the early 1980s the design won several nationwide awards for the architects Napper, Errington, Collerton Partnership, including the prestigious Civic Trust Award. Shortly afterwards Queen Elizabeth II attended an exhibition in the Carnegie Arts Centre, Workington, where after being introduced to many of the leading personalities, observed photographs and miniature models of the scheme.
