= Bunceton, Missouri =

- City
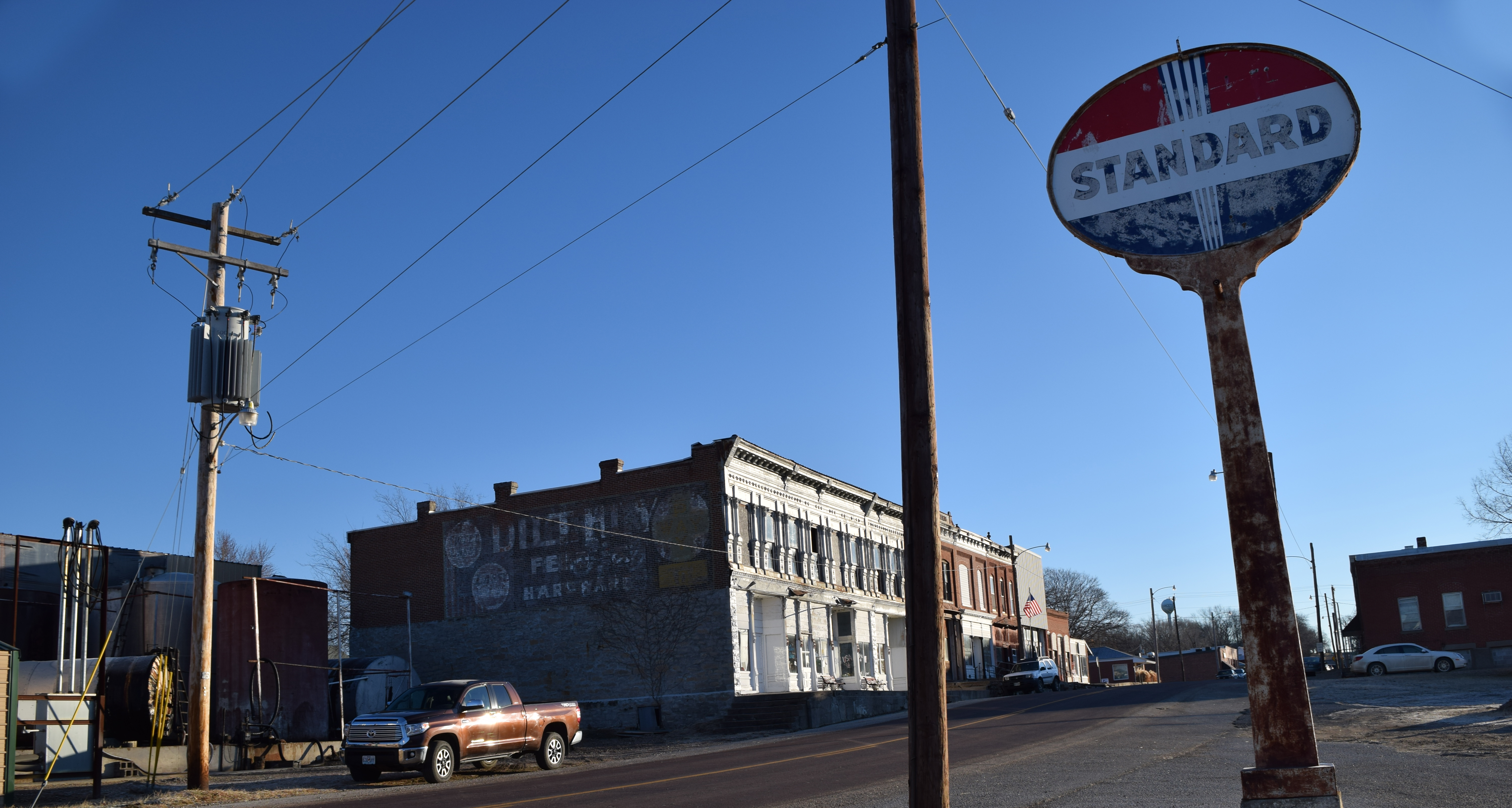
- Main Street in Bunceton

- Location of Bunceton, Missouri
- Coordinates: 38°47′22″N 92°47′57″W
- Country: United States
- State: Missouri
- County: Cooper

Area
  - Total: 0.95 sq mi (2.45 km^{2})
  - Land: 0.95 sq mi (2.45 km^{2})
  - Water: 0.0039 sq mi (0.01 km^{2})
- Elevation: 807 ft (246 m)

Population (2020)
  - Total: 334
  - Density: 353.7/sq mi (136.57/km^{2})
- Time zone: UTC-6 (Central (CST))
  - Summer (DST): UTC-5 (CDT)
- ZIP code: 65237
- Area code: 660
- FIPS code: 29-09658
- GNIS feature ID: 2393461

Bunceton is a city in Cooper County, Missouri, United States. As of the 2020 census, Bunceton had a population of 334.

== History ==
Bunceton was laid out and platted in 1868. The city was named for Harvey Bunce, an early county resident. A post office has been in operation at Bunceton since 1868. In 1980, Bunceton elected the United States' first openly gay mayor, Gerald Ulrich.

== Geography ==
The town is located on Missouri Route J, three miles east of Missouri Route 5. Bunceton is on the Stevens Branch tributary of Petite Saline Creek.

According to the United States Census Bureau, the city has a total area of 0.94 square miles (2.43 km^{2}), all land.

== Demographics ==
Historical population
| Census | Pop. | Note | %± |
|---|---|---|---|
| 1890 | 493 | | — |
| 1900 | 856 | | 73.6% |
| 1910 | 788 | | −7.9% |
| 1920 | 860 | | 9.1% |
| 1930 | 693 | | −19.4% |
| 1940 | 648 | | −6.5% |
| 1950 | 556 | | −14.2% |
| 1960 | 468 | | −15.8% |
| 1970 | 437 | | −6.6% |
| 1980 | 419 | | −4.1% |
| 1990 | 341 | | −18.6% |
| 2000 | 348 | | 2.1% |
| 2010 | 354 | | 1.7% |
| 2020 | 334 | | −5.6% |
U.S. Decennial Census

=== 2010 census ===
As of the census of 2010, there were 354 people, 140 households, and 97 families living in the city. The population density was 376.6 inhabitants per square mile (145.4/km^{2}). There were 182 housing units at an average density of 193.6 per square mile (74.7/km^{2}). The racial makeup of the city was 93.5% White, 4.2% African American, 0.3% from other races, and 2.0% from two or more races. Hispanic or Latino of any race were 0.8% of the population.

There were 140 households, of which 40.7% had children under the age of 18 living with them, 53.6% were married couples living together, 6.4% had a female householder with no husband present, 9.3% had a male householder with no wife present, and 30.7% were non-families. Of all households 25.7% were made up of individuals, and 11.4% had someone living alone who was 65 years of age or older. The average household size was 2.53 and the average family size was 2.97.

The median age in the city was 36.6 years. Of residents, 25.1% were under the age of 18; 9.4% were between the ages of 18 and 24; 26.6% were from 25 to 44; 28.5% were from 45 to 64; and 10.5% were 65 years of age or older. The gender makeup of the city was 48.9% male and 51.1% female.

=== 2000 census ===
As of the census of 2000, there were 348 people, 152 households, and 93 families living in the city. The population density was 368.1 inhabitants per square mile (142.1/km^{2}). There were 182 housing units at an average density of 192.5 per square mile (74.3/km^{2}). The racial makeup of the city was 90.80% White, 6.90% African American, 0.57% Native American, and 1.72% from two or more races. Hispanic or Latino of any race were 0.29% of the population.

There were 152 households, out of which 28.3% had children under the age of 18 living with them, 43.4% were married couples living together, 9.9% had a female householder with no husband present, and 38.8% were non-families. Of all households 32.2% were made up of individuals, and 11.2% had someone living alone who was 65 years of age or older. The average household size was 2.29 and the average family size was 2.89.

In the city the population was spread out, with 24.1% under the age of 18, 7.2% from 18 to 24, 31.3% from 25 to 44, 22.7% from 45 to 64, and 14.7% who were 65 years of age or older. The median age was 38 years. For every 100 females, there were 105.9 males. For every 100 females age 18 and over, there were 98.5 males.

The median income for a household in the city was $27,917, and the median income for a family was $33,750. Males had a median income of $21,696 versus $19,167 for females. The per capita income for the city was $13,202. About 7.3% of families and 11.1% of the population were below the poverty line, including 11.4% of those under age 18 and 7.3% of those age 65 or over.

== Education ==
Cooper County R-IV, also known as Bunceton School, serves kindergarten through twelfth grade.
