= Cooper County, Missouri =

County in Missouri, United States

- County
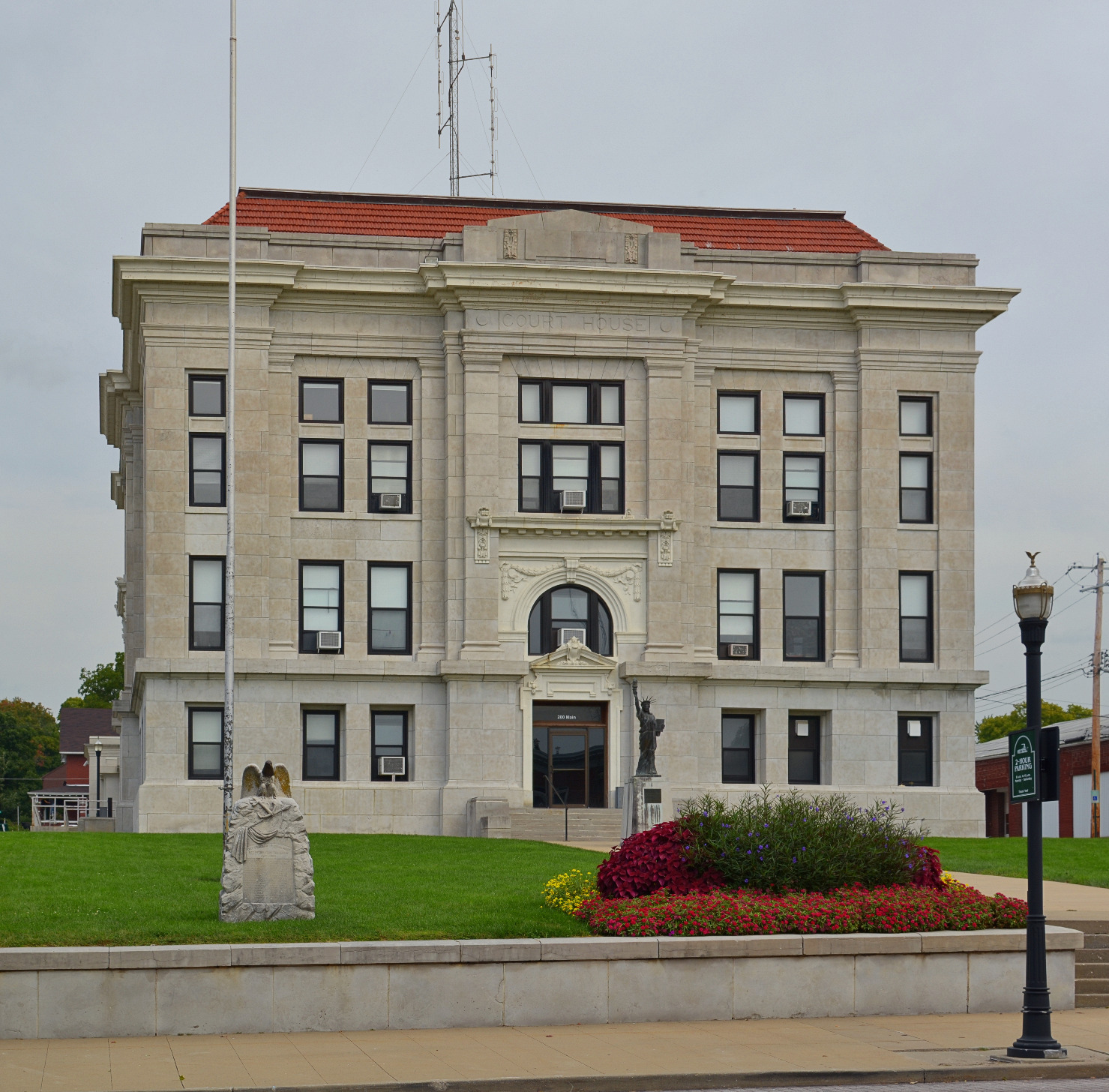
- Cooper County Courthouse in Boonville

- Location within the U.S. state of Missouri
- Coordinates: 38°51′N 92°49′W
- Country: United States
- State: Missouri
- Founded: December 17, 1818
- Named for: Sarshell Cooper
- Seat: Boonville
- Largest city: Boonville

Area
  - Total: 569 sq mi (1,470 km^{2})
  - Land: 565 sq mi (1,460 km^{2})
  - Water: 4.4 sq mi (11 km^{2}) 0.8%

Population (2020)
  - Total: 17,103
  - Estimate (2025): 17,136 ▲
  - Density: 30.3/sq mi (11.7/km^{2})
- Time zone: UTC−6 (Central)
  - Summer (DST): UTC−5 (CDT)
- Congressional district: 4th
- Website: www.coopercountymo.gov

Cooper County is located in the central portion of the U.S. state of Missouri. As of the 2020 United States census, the population was 17,103. Its county seat is Boonville. The county was organized December 17, 1818, and named for Sarshell Cooper, a frontier settler who was killed by Native Americans near Arrow Rock in 1814. It is a part of the Columbia, Missouri metropolitan area.

== Geography ==
According to the U.S. Census Bureau, the county has a total area of 569 square miles (1,470 km^{2}), of which 565 square miles (1,460 km^{2}) is land and 4.4 square miles (11 km^{2}) (0.8%) is water.

=== Adjacent counties ===
- Howard County (north)
- Boone County (northeast)
- Moniteau County (southeast)
- Morgan County (south)
- Pettis County (west)
- Saline County (northwest)

=== Major highways ===
- Interstate 70
- U.S. Route 40
- Route 5
- Route 41
- Route 87
- Route 98
- Route 135
- Route 179

=== National protected area ===
- Big Muddy National Fish and Wildlife Refuge

== Demographics ==
Historical population
Census	Pop.	Note	%±
1820	6,959		—
1830	6,904		−0.8%
1840	10,484		51.9%
1850	12,950		23.5%
1860	17,356		34.0%
1870	20,692		19.2%
1880	21,596		4.4%
1890	22,707		5.1%
1900	22,532		−0.8%
1910	20,311		−9.9%
1920	19,308		−4.9%
1930	19,522		1.1%
1940	18,075		−7.4%
1950	16,608		−8.1%
1960	15,448		−7.0%
1970	14,732		−4.6%
1980	14,643		−0.6%
1990	14,835		1.3%
2000	16,670		12.4%
2010	17,601		5.6%
2020	17,103		−2.8%
2025 (est.)	17,136	▲	0.2%
U.S. Decennial Census; 1790-1960 1900-1990; 1990-2000 2010-2015

=== 2020 census ===
As of the 2020 census, the county had a population of 17,103. The median age was 40.7 years; 22.3% of residents were under the age of 18 and 18.9% of residents were 65 years of age or older. For every 100 females there were 106.3 males, and for every 100 females age 18 and over there were 106.3 males age 18 and over.

There were 6,584 households in the county, of which 29.6% had children under the age of 18 living with them and 26.1% had a female householder with no spouse or partner present. About 29.3% of all households were made up of individuals and 13.7% had someone living alone who was 65 years of age or older. There were 7,281 housing units, of which 9.6% were vacant; among occupied housing units, 71.3% were owner-occupied and 28.7% were renter-occupied. The homeowner vacancy rate was 1.4% and the rental vacancy rate was 6.2%.

As of the 2020 census, 47.0% of residents lived in urban areas, while 53.0% lived in rural areas.

=== Racial and ethnic composition ===
As of the 2020 census, the racial makeup of the county was 86.8% White, 5.4% Black or African American, 0.3% American Indian and Alaska Native, 0.4% Asian, 0.0% Native Hawaiian and Pacific Islander, 0.7% from some other race, and 6.3% from two or more races; Hispanic or Latino residents of any race comprised 1.9% of the population.

Cooper County, Missouri – Racial and ethnic composition Note: the US Census treats Hispanic/Latino as an ethnic category. This table excludes Latinos from the racial categories and assigns them to a separate category. Hispanics/Latinos may be of any race.
Race / Ethnicity (NH = Non-Hispanic)	Pop 1980	Pop 1990	Pop 2000	Pop 2010	Pop 2020	% 1980	% 1990	% 2000	% 2010	% 2020
White alone (NH)	13,569	13,491	14,762	15,754	14,730	92.67%	90.94%	88.55%	89.51%	86.13%
Black or African American alone (NH)	889	1,143	1,482	1,201	920	6.07%	7.70%	8.89%	6.82%	5.38%
Native American or Alaska Native alone (NH)	31	50	58	49	53	0.21%	0.34%	0.35%	0.28%	0.31%
Asian alone (NH)	43	47	34	77	67	0.29%	0.32%	0.20%	0.44%	0.39%
Native Hawaiian or Pacific Islander alone (NH)	x	x	3	3	6	x	x	0.02%	0.02%	0.04%
Other race alone (NH)	15	8	14	8	62	0.10%	0.05%	0.08%	0.05%	0.36%
Mixed race or Multiracial (NH)	x	x	174	277	943	x	x	1.04%	1.57%	5.51%
Hispanic or Latino (any race)	96	96	143	232	322	0.66%	0.65%	0.86%	1.32%	1.88%
Total	14,643	14,835	16,670	17,601	17,103	100.00%	100.00%	100.00%	100.00%	100.00%

=== 2000 census ===
As of the 2000 census, there were 16,670 people, 5,932 households and 4,140 families residing in the county. The population density was 30 inhabitants per square mile (12/km^{2}). There were 6,676 housing units at an average density of 12 units per square mile (4.6/km^{2}). The racial makeup of the county was 89.05% White, 8.96% Black or African American, 0.36% Native American, 0.23% Asian, 0.02% Pacific Islander, 0.28% from other races, and 1.11% from two or more races. Approximately 0.86% of the population were Hispanic or Latino of any race.

There were 5,932 households, of which 31.80% had children under the age of 18 living with them, 57.40% were married couples living together, 9.00% had a female householder with no husband present, and 30.20% were non-families. 26.10% of all households were made up of individuals, and 12.60% had someone living alone who was 65 years of age or older. The average household size was 2.46 and the average family size was 2.97.

Age distribution was 22.80% under the age of 18, 14.00% from 18 to 24, 27.40% from 25 to 44, 20.60% from 45 to 64, and 15.20% who were 65 years of age or older. The median age was 35 years. For every 100 females, there were 117.40 males. For every 100 females age 18 and over, there were 120.00 males.

The median household income was $35,313, and the median family income was $41,526. Males had a median income of $28,513 versus $20,965 for females. The per capita income for the county was $15,648. About 8.30% of families and 10.70% of the population were below the poverty line, including 12.80% of those under age 18 and 8.30% of those age 65 or over.

== Education ==
=== Public schools ===
- Blackwater R-II School District – Blackwater
  - Blackwater Elementary School (PK-08)
- Boonville R-I School District – Boonville
  - Hannah Cole Primary School (PK-02)
  - David Barton Elementary School (03-05)
  - Laura Speed Elliott Middle School (06-08)
  - Boonville High School (09-12)
- Cooper County R-IV School District – Bunceton
  - Bunceton Elementary School (K-06)
  - Bunceton High School (07-12)
- Otterville R-VI School District – Otterville
  - Otterville Elementary School (K-06)
  - Otterville High School (07-12)
- Pilot Grove C-4 School District – Pilot Grove
  - Pilot Grove Elementary School (PK-05)
  - Pilot Grove Middle School (06-08)
  - Pilot Grove High School (09-12)
- Prairie Home R-V School District – Prairie Home
  - Prairie Home Elementary School (K-06)
  - Prairie Home High School (07-12)

=== Private schools ===
- Saints Peter & Paul School – Boonville (K-09) – Roman Catholic
- Zion Lutheran School – Bunceton (02-08) – Lutheran
- St. Joseph Elementary School – Pilot Grove (K-08) – Roman Catholic

=== Public libraries ===
- Boonville/Cooper Branch Library

== Politics ==
=== Local ===
The Republican Party completely controls politics at the local level in Cooper County. Republicans hold all of the elected positions in the county.

Cooper County, Missouri

Elected countywide officials
Assessor	James R. Lachner	Republican
Circuit Clerk	Nancy Fisher	Republican
County Clerk	Sarah Herman	Republican
Collector	Carol Nauman	Republican
Commissioner (presiding)	Eddie Brickner	Republican
Commissioner (district 1)	Paul Davis	Republican
Commissioner (district 2)	Ernie Walther	Republican
Coroner	James Hurt	Republican
Prosecuting Attorney	Douglas Abele	Republican
Public Administrator	Stephanie Young	Republican
Recorder	Nancy Fisher	Republican
Sheriff	Chris Class	Republican
Surveyor	Curtis Basinger	Republican
Treasurer	Stanley Serck	Republican

=== State ===
Past Gubernatorial Elections Results
Year	Republican	Democratic	Third Parties
2024	72.62% 6,378	24.66% 2,166	2.72% 239
2020	74.58% 5,435	21.87% 1,594	3.54% 258
2016	61.89% 4,958	35.43% 2,838	2.68% 215
2012	51.29% 3,837	45.69% 3,418	3.02 226
2008	52.28% 4,170	45.99% 3,669	1.73% 138
2004	61.24% 4,593	37.68% 2,826	1.08% 81
2000	53.39% 3,641	44.18% 3,013	2.44% 166
1996	39.00% 2,576	57.70% 3,811	3.30% 218

Cooper County is divided into three legislative districts in the Missouri House of Representatives, all of which elected Republicans, but one is currently vacant.

- District 47 — Chuck Basye (R-Rocheport). Consists of areas east of the city of Boonville.

Missouri House of Representatives — District 47 — Cooper County (2020)
Party	Candidate	Votes	%	±%
Republican	Chuck Basye	224	81.16%	
Democratic	Adrian Plank	52	18.84%	

Missouri House of Representatives — District 47 — Cooper County (2016)
Party	Candidate	Votes	%	±%
Republican	Chuck Basye	228	69.30%	+0.83
Democratic	Susan McClintic	101	30.70%	−0.83

Missouri House of Representatives — District 47 — Cooper County (2014)
Party	Candidate	Votes	%	±%
Republican	Chuck Basye	139	68.47%	+28.88
Democratic	John Wright	64	31.53%	−28.88

Missouri House of Representatives — District 47 — Cooper County (2012)
Party	Candidate	Votes	%	±%
Democratic	John Wright	156	39.59%	
Republican	Mitch Richards	238	60.41%	

- District 48 — Tim Taylor (politician) (R-Bunceton). Consists of the communities of Blackwater, Boonville, Bunceton, Otterville, and Pilot Grove.

Missouri House of Representatives — District 48 — Cooper County (2020)
Party	Candidate	Votes	%	±%
Republican	Tim Taylor (politician)	4,056	65.39%	
Democratic	William (Bill) Betteridge	2,147	34.61%	

Missouri House of Representatives — District 48 — Cooper County (2016)
Party	Candidate	Votes	%	±%
Republican	Dave Muntzel	5,433	82.34%	−17.66
Independent	Debra Dilks	1,165	17.66%	+17.66

Missouri House of Representatives — District 48 — Cooper County (2014)
Party	Candidate	Votes	%	±%
Republican	Dave Muntzel	2,980	100.00%	+32.00

Missouri House of Representatives — District 48 — Cooper County (2012)
Party	Candidate	Votes	%	±%
Republican	Dave Muntzel	4,278	68.00%	
Democratic	Ron Monnig	2,013	32.00%	

- District 50 — Sara Walsh. (R-Ashland). Consists of the community of Prairie Home and much of the rest of the eastern portion of the county.

Missouri House of Representatives — District 50 — Cooper County (2020)
Party	Candidate	Votes	%	±%
Republican	Sara Walsh	619	81.55%	
Democratic	Kari Chesney	140	18.45%	

Missouri House of Representatives — District 50 — Cooper County (2016)
Party	Candidate	Votes	%	±%
Republican	Caleb Jones	687	100.00%	

Missouri House of Representatives — District 50 — Cooper County (2014)
Party	Candidate	Votes	%	±%
Republican	Caleb Jones	336	100.00%	

Missouri House of Representatives — District 50 — Cooper County (2012)
Party	Candidate	Votes	%	±%
Republican	Caleb Jones	514	100.00%	

All of Cooper County is a part of Missouri's 19th District in the Missouri Senate and is currently represented by Caleb Rowden (R-Columbia).

Missouri Senate — District 19 — Cooper County (2020)
Party	Candidate	Votes	%	±%
Republican	Caleb Rowden	5,707	78.92%	
Democratic	Judy Baker	1,524	21.08%	

Missouri Senate — District 19 — Cooper County (2016)
Party	Candidate	Votes	%	±%
Republican	Caleb Rowden	5,540	70.47%	−1.90
Democratic	Stephen Webber	2,321	29.53%	+1.90

Missouri Senate — District 19 — Cooper County (2012)
Party	Candidate	Votes	%	±%
Republican	Kurt Schaefer	5,287	72.37%	
Democratic	Mary Wynne Still	2,019	27.63%	

=== Federal ===
U.S. Senate — Missouri — Cooper County (2016)
Party	Candidate	Votes	%	±%
Republican	Roy Blunt	4,668	58.55%	+11.46
Democratic	Jason Kander	2,920	36.63%	−8.32
Libertarian	Jonathan Dine	239	3.00%	−4.96
Green	Johnathan McFarland	67	0.84%	+0.84
Constitution	Fred Ryman	78	0.98%	+0.98

U.S. Senate — Missouri — Cooper County (2012)
Party	Candidate	Votes	%	±%
Republican	Todd Akin	3,494	47.09%	
Democratic	Claire McCaskill	3,335	44.95%	
Libertarian	Jonathan Dine	591	7.96%	

All of Cooper County is included in Missouri's 4th Congressional District and is currently represented by Vicky Hartzler (R-Harrisonville) in the U.S. House of Representatives.

U.S. House of Representatives — Missouri's 4th Congressional District — Cooper County (2020)
Party	Candidate	Votes	%	±%
Republican	Vicky Hartzler	5,434	75.39%	
Democratic	Linsey Simmons	1,504	20.87%	
Libertarian	Steven Koonse	270	3.75%	

U.S. House of Representatives — Missouri's 4th Congressional District — Cooper County (2016)
Party	Candidate	Votes	%	±%
Republican	Vicky Hartzler	5,721	72.93%	+1.26
Democratic	Gordon Christensen	1,778	22.67%	+1.40
Libertarian	Mark Bliss	345	4.40%	−2.66

U.S. House of Representatives — Missouri’s 4th Congressional District — Cooper County (2014)
Party	Candidate	Votes	%	±%
Republican	Vicky Hartzler	2,813	71.67%	+7.68
Democratic	Nate Irvin	835	21.27%	−10.27
Libertarian	Herschel Young	277	7.06%	+3.40

U.S. House of Representatives — Missouri's 4th Congressional District — Cooper County (2012)
Party	Candidate	Votes	%	±%
Republican	Vicky Hartzler	4,689	63.99%	
Democratic	Teresa Hensley	2,311	31.54%	
Libertarian	Thomas Holbrook	268	3.66%	
Constitution	Greg Cowan	60	0.82%	

United States presidential election results for Cooper County, Missouri
Year	Republican		Democratic		Third party(ies)	
Year	No.	%	No.	%	No.	%
1888	2,416	47.02%	2,685	52.26%	37	0.72%
1892	2,222	45.25%	2,484	50.59%	204	4.15%
1896	2,711	47.06%	3,028	52.56%	22	0.38%
1900	2,738	48.96%	2,756	49.28%	98	1.75%
1904	2,767	51.98%	2,485	46.68%	71	1.33%
1908	2,679	50.73%	2,555	48.38%	47	0.89%
1912	2,270	44.84%	2,444	48.28%	348	6.87%
1916	2,830	52.27%	2,537	46.86%	47	0.87%
1920	5,151	58.16%	3,657	41.29%	48	0.54%
1924	4,755	52.76%	4,070	45.16%	187	2.08%
1928	4,794	52.02%	4,413	47.88%	9	0.10%
1932	3,695	40.05%	5,493	59.54%	38	0.41%
1936	4,980	48.84%	5,188	50.88%	29	0.28%
1940	5,720	55.30%	4,606	44.53%	17	0.16%
1944	4,928	56.79%	3,729	42.98%	20	0.23%
1948	4,094	51.38%	3,865	48.51%	9	0.11%
1952	5,208	59.90%	3,475	39.97%	12	0.14%
1956	4,995	58.72%	3,511	41.28%	0	0.00%
1960	4,672	54.77%	3,858	45.23%	0	0.00%
1964	3,530	45.66%	4,201	54.34%	0	0.00%
1968	4,115	55.29%	2,798	37.59%	530	7.12%
1972	5,172	68.92%	2,332	31.08%	0	0.00%
1976	3,694	54.25%	3,087	45.34%	28	0.41%
1980	3,996	58.34%	2,687	39.23%	166	2.42%
1984	4,603	67.47%	2,219	32.53%	0	0.00%
1988	3,737	59.64%	2,510	40.06%	19	0.30%
1992	2,867	39.07%	2,709	36.91%	1,763	24.02%
1996	2,900	43.75%	2,753	41.53%	976	14.72%
2000	4,072	59.97%	2,567	37.81%	151	2.22%
2004	5,058	67.37%	2,400	31.97%	50	0.67%
2008	4,902	61.08%	2,996	37.33%	128	1.59%
2012	4,887	65.06%	2,474	32.94%	150	2.00%
2016	5,624	70.42%	1,932	24.19%	430	5.38%
2020	6,272	72.15%	2,249	25.87%	172	1.98%
2024	6,393	72.36%	2,347	26.56%	95	1.08%

== Communities ==
=== Cities ===
- Blackwater
- Boonville (county seat)
- Bunceton
- Otterville
- Pilot Grove
- Prairie Home

=== Villages ===
- Windsor Place
- Wooldridge

=== Unincorporated communities ===
- Bellair
- Billingsville
- Chouteau Springs
- Clarks Fork
- Clifton City
- Harriston
- Lamine
- Lone Elm
- New Lebanon
- Overton
- Pisgah
- Pleasant Green
- Speed

=== Townships ===
Cooper County is divided into 14 townships:

- Blackwater
- Boonville
- Clark Fork
- Clear Creek
- Kelly
- Lamine
- Lebanon
- North Moniteau
- Otterville
- Palestine
- Pilot Grove
- Prairie Home
- Saline
- South Moniteau

== Notable person ==
- Country music singer Sara Evans was born in Cooper County.

== See also ==
- National Register of Historic Places listings in Cooper County, Missouri
