= Eightmile Creek (Missouri) =

Stream in the U.S. state of Missouri

Eightmile Creek is a stream in Cass County in the U.S. state of Missouri. It is a tributary to the South Grand River.

The stream headwaters arise approximately two miles east of Harrisonville at 38°38′40″N 94°18′15″W and an elevation of 1010 feet. The stream flows generally south passing under Missouri Route 7 just to the east of Daugherty and then passing west of Austin to its confluence with the South Grand adjacent to U.S. Route 71 about one mile northeast of Archie at 38°29′28″N 94°19′16″W and an elevation of 787 feet.

Eightmile Creek was named for its distance, about 8 miles (13 km) from Harrisonville.

== See also ==
- List of rivers of Missouri
