= Kingsville Township =

Kingsville Township may refer to:

- Kingsville Township, Johnson County, Missouri
- Kingsville Township, Ashtabula County, Ohio

== See also ==
- Kingsville (disambiguation)
