= Camp Branch (Big Creek tributary) =

Stream in the U.S. state of Missouri

Camp Branch is a stream in Cass and Johnson counties in the U.S. state of Missouri. It is a tributary of Big Creek.

The stream headwaters arise in Cass County at 38°44′20″N 94°19′45″W and the stream flows generally southeastward to its confluence with Big Creek in western Johnson County at 38°38′10″N 94°05′08″W. The stream starts five miles north of Harrisonville just north of Missouri Route P. It flows southeast under route P and Missouri Route 7 and passes just north of East Lynne and south of the community of Gunn City. The stream enters Johnson County and reaches its confluence 1.5 miles into Johnson County one mile east of the community of La Tour.

Camp Branch was named for the fact people camped along its course.

== See also ==
- List of rivers of Missouri
