= Victoria Park High School =

Coordinates: 33.9756°S 25.6133°E

- Victoria Park High School crest

Location
- Victoria Park Drive, South End; Port Elizabeth, Eastern Cape; South Africa

Information
- Type: Public
- Motto: Vivite fortes (Live Courageously)
- Religious affiliation: Christianity
- Established: January 1940; 86 years ago
- Headmaster: Garreth Jacobson
- Staff: 50 full-time
- Grades: 8–12
- Gender: Boys and girls
- Age: 14 to 18
- Enrollment: 1,000 pupils
- Language: English
- Schedule: 07:30 - 14:15
- Campus: Urban campus
- Colours: Green; Maroon; White
- Accreditation: Eastern Cape Department of Education
- Yearbook: "The Victorian"
- Website: victoriaparkhigh.com

Victoria Park High School is a public English medium co-educational day school high school situated in the suburb of Walmer in Port Elizabeth in the Eastern Cape province of South Africa. It is one of the top and most academic schools in Port Elizabeth. The school was established in 1940.

== General ==
Approximately 1000 students attend grades 8–12 and participate in activities, sports and the cultural arts. To maintain a favourable pupil/teacher ratio, the Governing body employs approximately 20 extra teachers.

== Headmasters ==
- H.W. Arnott (1940–1947)
- T.C. Thorp (1947–1965)
- G.A.C. Pearson (1966–1982)
- D. Blake (1983–1993)
- P. Hollely (1993–2002)
- M.J. Vermaak (2003–2021)
- A. Jansen (2021-2022)
- G. Jacobson (2022–present)

== History ==
The school was established in January 1940, and was situated in the Dutch Reformed Church hall in South End. The first day saw an enrolment of 38 grade 9 pupils, one assistant woman teacher and H.W. Arnott, the headmaster. It was he who came up with the school's motto, "Vivite Fortes", meaning "Live courageously". Sport was played on the fields of Walmer Rugby & Cricket Clubs, and two hired tennis courts in Second Avenue.

In 1941, a grade 10 was added, along with an extra teacher. When Arnott returned in 1945 after service in World War II, the school had moved to its present site at the junction of Victoria Park Drive and First Avenue Walmer, as well as having classes from grade 9 to Matric.

== Clubs and societies ==
=== Cultural societies ===
- Drama
- Jazz band
- Wind Band
- Steel band
- Choir
- Impulse (cultural society)
- Debating
- Quiz Team
- The VIP (School Newspaper)
- Toastmasters
- Photography
- Science Club
- Hiking Club
- Cultural Society
- Art Club
- Ballroom Dancing

=== Service clubs ===
- Interact
- TAG (Teenage Action Group)
- TADA (Teenagers Against Drug & Alcohol Abuse)
- LIFE(Life is for everyone)
- PAW (Protecting Animals Worldwide)
- Blood Peer Promoters
- First Aid
- ECO (Environmental Caring Organisation)
- Sound and Lighting Technicians

=== Self improvement ===
- Life (Love Is For Everyone)
- VP Toastmasters

== Leadership groups ==
- Junior City Council
- RCL (Representative Council of Learners)
- Councilors (School Prefects)

== Sport ==
The following are sports played by both sexes at Victoria Park High School:

- Athletics
- Cricket
- Golf
- Hockey
- Soccer
- Swimming
- Tennis
- Squash
- Paddling
- Chess
- Hiking
- Netball (girls only)
- Rugby (boys only)
