= Coldwater Creek (South Grand River tributary) =

Stream in the U.S. state of Missouri

Coldwater Creek is a stream in Miami County, Kansas and Cass County, Missouri in the United States. It is a tributary of the South Fork of the South Grand River.

The stream headwaters arise in eastern Kansas just over one mile west of the Kansas-Missouri border at 38°32′42″N 94°37′57″W and it flows east into Missouri and crosses under Missouri Route D just south of Lisle. Its confluence with the South Fork is at 38°34′15″N 94°33′23″W at an elevation of 860 feet.

Coldwater Creek was so named due to the cold water it carries.

== See also ==
- List of rivers of Missouri
