= Wingate, Missouri =

Unincorporated community in Missouri, U.S.

Coordinates: 38°43′52″N 94°12′17″W

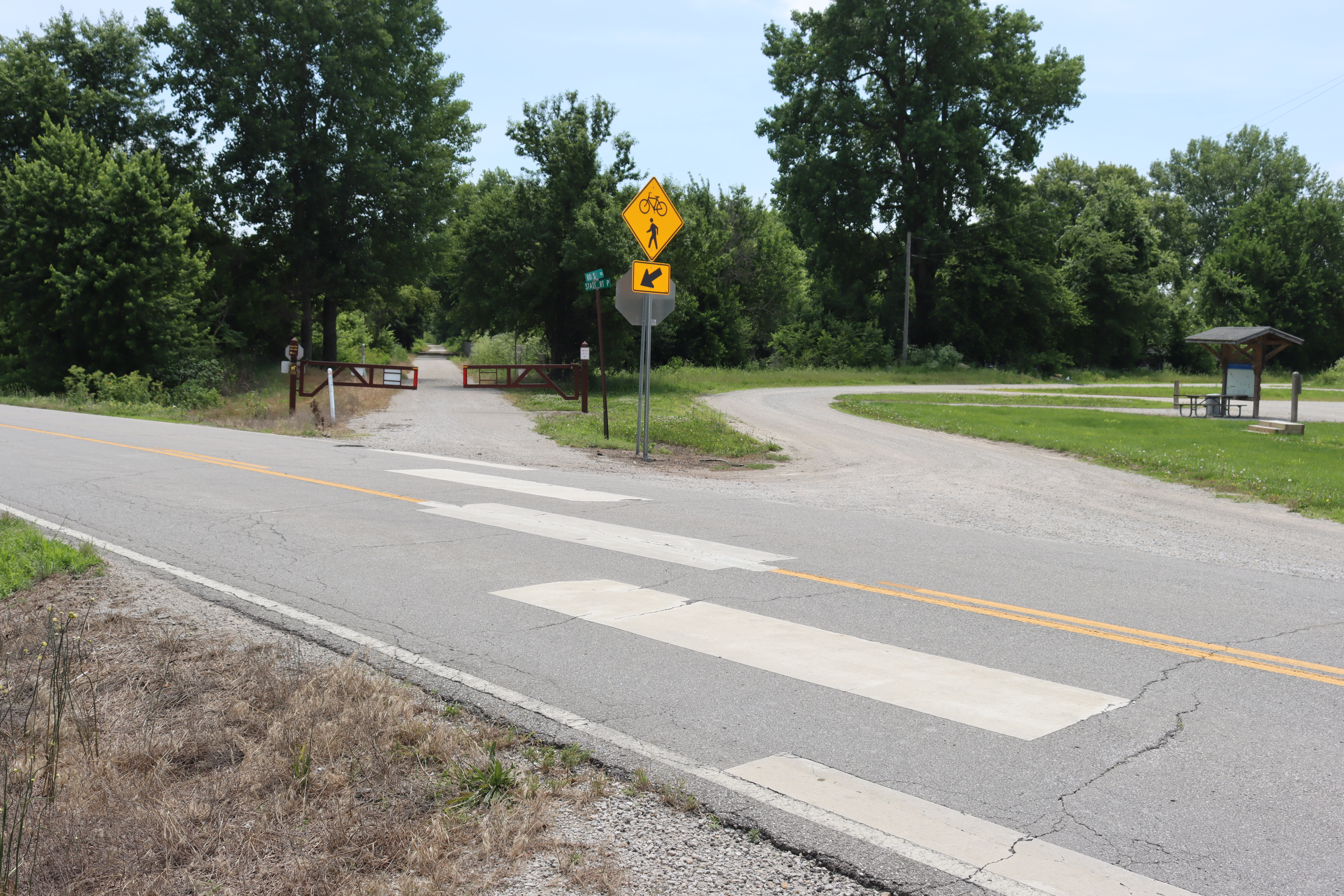
The Intersection of State Route P and the Rock Island Trail in Wingate

Wingate is an unincorporated community in northeast Cass County, in the U.S. state of Missouri.

The community is on Missouri Route P approximately five miles southeast of Pleasant Hill and nine miles northeast of Harrisonville. Big Creek flows past approximately one mile to the north and east. The Chicago, Rock Island and Pacific Railroad line passes the southwest side of the community.

Wingate was platted in 1904, and named in honor of Joseph Wingate Folk, 31st Governor of Missouri.
