= Strasburg, Missouri =

- City
- Location of Strasburg, Missouri
- Coordinates: 38°45′36″N 94°9′53″W
- Country: United States
- State: Missouri
- County: Cass

Area
  - Total: 0.19 sq mi (0.50 km^{2})
  - Land: 0.19 sq mi (0.50 km^{2})
  - Water: 0 sq mi (0.00 km^{2})
- Elevation: 843 ft (257 m)

Population (2020)
  - Total: 107
  - Density: 550.9/sq mi (212.71/km^{2})
- Time zone: UTC-6 (Central (CST))
  - Summer (DST): UTC-5 (CDT)
- ZIP code: 64090
- Area code: 816
- FIPS code: 29-71098
- GNIS feature ID: 2395983

Strasburg is a city in northeastern Cass County, Missouri, United States. The population was 107 at the 2020 census. It is part of the Kansas City metropolitan area.

== History ==
Strasburg was originally called Crawford's Fork, and under the latter name was founded in the 1860s. The present name is after the city of Strasbourg (German: Strassburg), then in Germany, but now part of France.

== Geography ==
Strasburg is located on Missouri Route 58 approximately 5.5 miles east of Pleasant Hill. Kingsville in western Johnson County is about five miles to the east on Route 58. Big Creek flows past approximately on mile to the south and its tributary Crawford Creek flows past the east side of the city.

According to the United States Census Bureau, the city has a total area of 0.19 square miles (0.49 km^{2}), all land.

== Demographics ==
Historical population
Census	Pop.	Note	%±
1880	75		—
1910	180		—
1920	171		−5.0%
1930	144		−15.8%
1940	153		6.3%
1950	180		17.6%
1960	213		18.3%
1970	181		−15.0%
1980	170		−6.1%
1990	124		−27.1%
2000	136		9.7%
2010	141		3.7%
2020	107		−24.1%
U.S. Decennial Census

=== Racial and ethnic composition ===
Strasburg city, Missouri – Racial and ethnic composition Note: the US Census treats Hispanic/Latino as an ethnic category. This table excludes Latinos from the racial categories and assigns them to a separate category. Hispanics/Latinos may be of any race.
Race / Ethnicity (NH = Non-Hispanic)	Pop 2000	Pop 2010	Pop 2020	% 2000	% 2010	% 2020
White alone (NH)	131	141	96	96.32%	100.00%	89.72%
Black or African American alone (NH)	0	0	2	0.00%	0.00%	1.87%
Native American or Alaska Native alone (NH)	1	0	0	0.74%	0.00%	0.00%
Asian alone (NH)	0	0	1	0.00%	0.00%	0.93%
Native Hawaiian or Pacific Islander alone (NH)	0	0	0	0.00%	0.00%	0.00%
Other race alone (NH)	0	0	0	0.00%	0.00%	0.00%
Mixed race or Multiracial (NH)	4	0	8	2.94%	0.00%	7.48%
Hispanic or Latino (any race)	0	0	0	0.00%	0.00%	0.00%
Total	136	141	107	100.00%	100.00%	100.00%

=== 2010 census ===
As of the census of 2010, there were 141 people, 54 households, and 41 families living in the city. The population density was 742.1 inhabitants per square mile (286.5/km^{2}). There were 58 housing units at an average density of 305.3 per square mile (117.9/km^{2}). The racial makeup of the city was 100.0% White.

There were 54 households, of which 35.2% had children under the age of 18 living with them, 57.4% were married couples living together, 7.4% had a female householder with no husband present, 11.1% had a male householder with no wife present, and 24.1% were non-families. 20.4% of all households were made up of individuals, and 9.3% had someone living alone who was 65 years of age or older. The average household size was 2.61 and the average family size was 3.05.

The median age in the city was 35.8 years. 24.8% of residents were under the age of 18; 9.3% were between the ages of 18 and 24; 30.5% were from 25 to 44; 21.9% were from 45 to 64; and 13.5% were 65 years of age or older. The gender makeup of the city was 55.3% male and 44.7% female.

=== 2000 census ===
As of the census of 2000, there were 136 people, 51 households, and 34 families living in the city. The population density was 619.6 inhabitants per square mile (239.2/km^{2}). There were 53 housing units at an average density of 241.5 per square mile (93.2/km^{2}). The racial makeup of the city was 96.32% White, 0.74% Native American, and 2.94% from two or more races.

There were 51 households, out of which 33.3% had children under the age of 18 living with them, 54.9% were married couples living together, 5.9% had a female householder with no husband present, and 31.4% were non-families. 23.5% of all households were made up of individuals, and 15.7% had someone living alone who was 65 years of age or older. The average household size was 2.67 and the average family size was 3.23.

In the city the population was spread out, with 34.6% under the age of 18, 8.1% from 18 to 24, 26.5% from 25 to 44, 14.0% from 45 to 64, and 16.9% who were 65 years of age or older. The median age was 32 years. For every 100 females, there were 100.0 males. For every 100 females age 18 and over, there were 111.9 males.

The median income for a household in the city was $30,417, and the median income for a family was $31,875. Males had a median income of $31,250 versus $17,500 for females. The per capita income for the city was $10,655. There were 20.0% of families and 30.1% of the population living below the poverty line, including 35.2% of under eighteens and 15.8% of those over 64.

== Politics/Elections ==
Position	Holder
Mayor	Greg McClure
Mayor Pro Tem	Sandra
North Ward	Sandra / Trent Raysek
South Ward	Gary Lee Allen Birge / Perry Allee

== Junior City Council ==
The Strasburg City Council established the United States' first Junior City Council in 2006, sponsored by City Council member Patricia Ford and strongly supported by Mayor Gregory McClure. In addition, State support came from District 122 Missouri House Representative Mike McGhee, who hosted a meeting with the founding council in its second year. The Council itself is composed of local youth who are elected into office. They focus on municipal issues, just as the official City Council does. Members of City council were as follows: Mayor Greg McClure, Lieutenant Mayor Gary Birge, South Ward Councilman Gary Birge, North Ward Councilman Pat Ford, South Ward Councilman Theresa Brayton, and North Ward Councilman Brian Ross.

== Education ==
It is in the Strasburg C-3 School District, an elementary school district.

Metropolitan Community College has the Strasburg school district area in its service area, but not its in-district taxation area.
