= Baldwin Park =

Baldwin Park may refer to:

- Baldwin Park, California
  - Baldwin Park (Metrolink station) in Baldwin Park, California
- Baldwin Park, Florida, a neighborhood in Orlando, Florida
- Baldwin Park, Missouri
- A public park in Baldwin, Nassau County, New York
- An instrumental by Sonder from the Album Into.
