= Pleasant Hill Downtown Historic District =

Historic district in Missouri, United States

- U.S. National Register of Historic Places
- U.S. Historic district
- Location within Missouri Location within the United States
- Location: Approx. bounded by the 200 block of Cedar St., 100 block of Lake St., 100-115 Wyoming St. and 101-204 First St., Pleasant Hill, Missouri
- Coordinates: 38°47′17″N 94°16′25″W
- Area: 19.5 acres (7.9 ha)
- Architect: U.S. Treasury; Albert B. Fuller
- Architectural style: Italianate, Late 19th and 20th Century Revivals
- NRHP reference No.: 04000781
- Added to NRHP: March 23, 2005

Pleasant Hill Downtown Historic District is a national historic district in Pleasant Hill, Cass County, Missouri. The district includes 53 contributing buildings, a contributing site, and a contributing structure in the central business district of Pleasant Hill. It developed between about 1865 and 1959, and includes representative examples of Italianate, Jacobethan Revival, Colonial Revival, Classical Revival, and Modern Movement style architecture. Notable buildings include:

- the Missouri Pacific Depot (1903), 100 Wyoming St., a one-story brick railroad depot;
- Sinclair Fuel and Service Station (c. 1950), 204 S. First St., one-story concrete block commercial building;
- Benson Brothers Lumber Company (1925), 215 S. First St., a brick, false front commercial block, plus a contributing shed;
- J. R. Prewitt & Sons Manufacturing, Inc. (c. 1926), 201C S. First St., a brick one-part commercial block, with broad stepped parapet walls;
- Knorpp's Opera House (c. 1880), 135 S. First St., a two-part commercial block;
- Wherritt Building (1924), 123 S. First St., brick one-part commercial block with a clipped corner entrance, surmounted by front facade parapet with modest crenellation;
- Booth Public Library (1948), 125 S. Lake St., a concrete block, one-story Modern Movement building with an irregular footprint;
- Municipal Power Plant (1939), 300 Commercial St., two-story brick government building, with brick pilasters, limestone windowsills and parapet coping, decorative limestone blocks, and soldier brick lintels;
- Pleasant Hill Post Office (1938), 124 S. Lake St., Colonial Revival brick one-part commercial block, with a stone belt course and parapet coping.
- Tucker Inn (1911), 306 Cedar St., brick two-part commercial block;
- People's Theatre (c.1909), 108-110 S. Lake, brick and reinforced concrete two-part commercial block, with a vertical neon sign and large entrance awning;
- Pleasant Hill City Hall (1959), 203 Paul St., low, horizontal-form building constructed of salmon-colored brick;
- Memorial Building (1948), 212 Cedar St., brick with a stepped front parapet, stone coping, and header brick windowsills.

The district was listed on the National Register of Historic Places in 1994.

== See also ==
- Pleasant Hill Historical Society Museum
