= East Lynne, Missouri =

- City
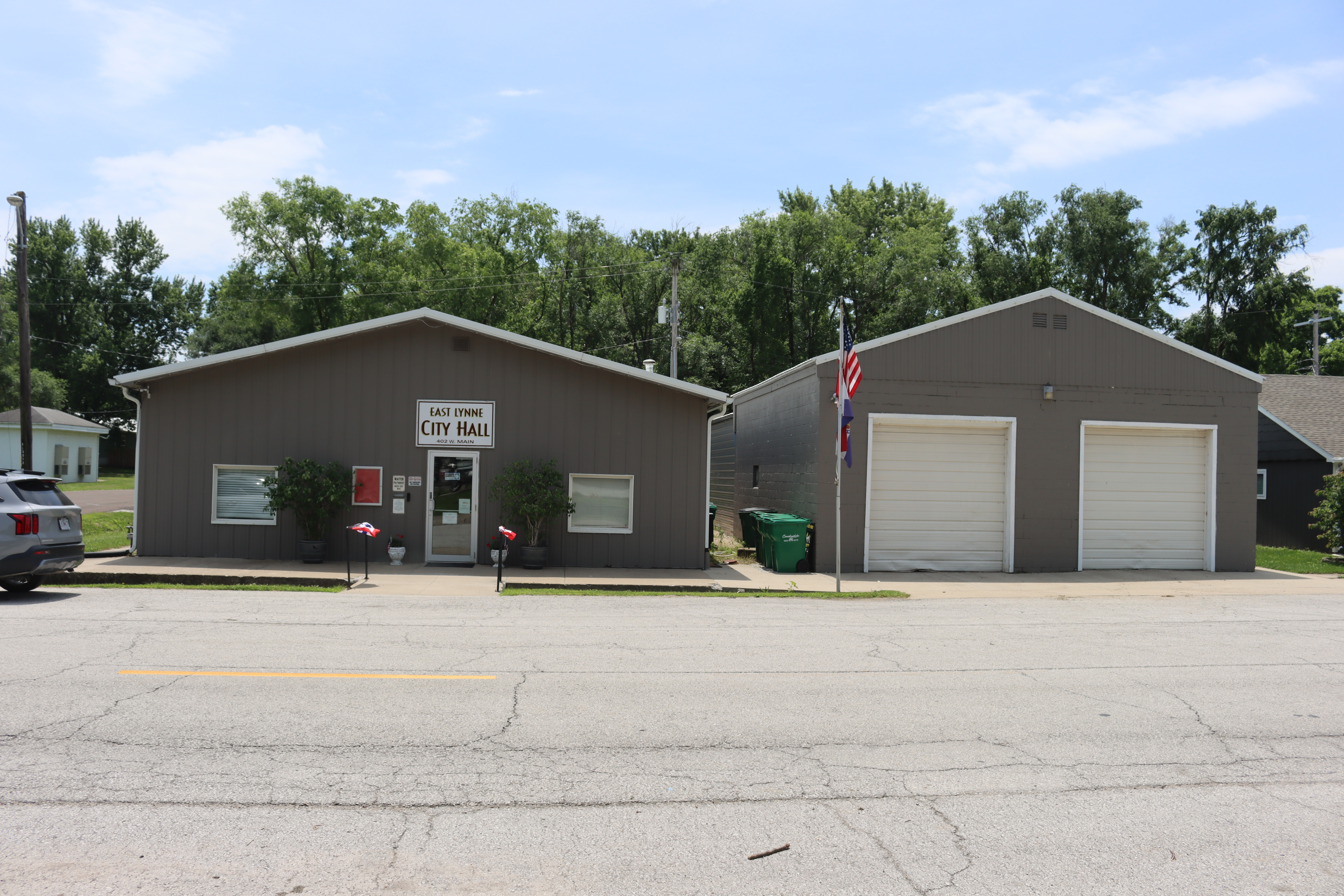
- City Hall

- Location of East Lynne, Missouri
- Coordinates: 38°40′06″N 94°13′51″W
- Country: United States
- State: Missouri
- County: Cass

Government
  - Mayor: James Charles “Charlie” Blalock
  - City Clerk: Shanon Zieman Weseman

Area
  - Total: 0.32 sq mi (0.84 km^{2})
  - Land: 0.32 sq mi (0.84 km^{2})
  - Water: 0 sq mi (0.00 km^{2})
- Elevation: 860 ft (260 m)

Population (2020)
  - Total: 294
  - Density: 901.2/sq mi (347.95/km^{2})
- Time zone: UTC-6 (Central (CST))
  - Summer (DST): UTC-5 (CDT)
- ZIP code: 64743
- Area code: 816
- FIPS code: 29-20980
- GNIS feature ID: 2394601

East Lynne is a city in eastern Cass County, Missouri The population was 294 at the 2020 census. It is part of the Kansas City metropolitan area within the United States.

== History ==
East Lynne was platted in 1871. The city took its name from the novel East Lynne by Ellen Wood. A post office has been in operation at East Lynne since 1871.

== Geography ==
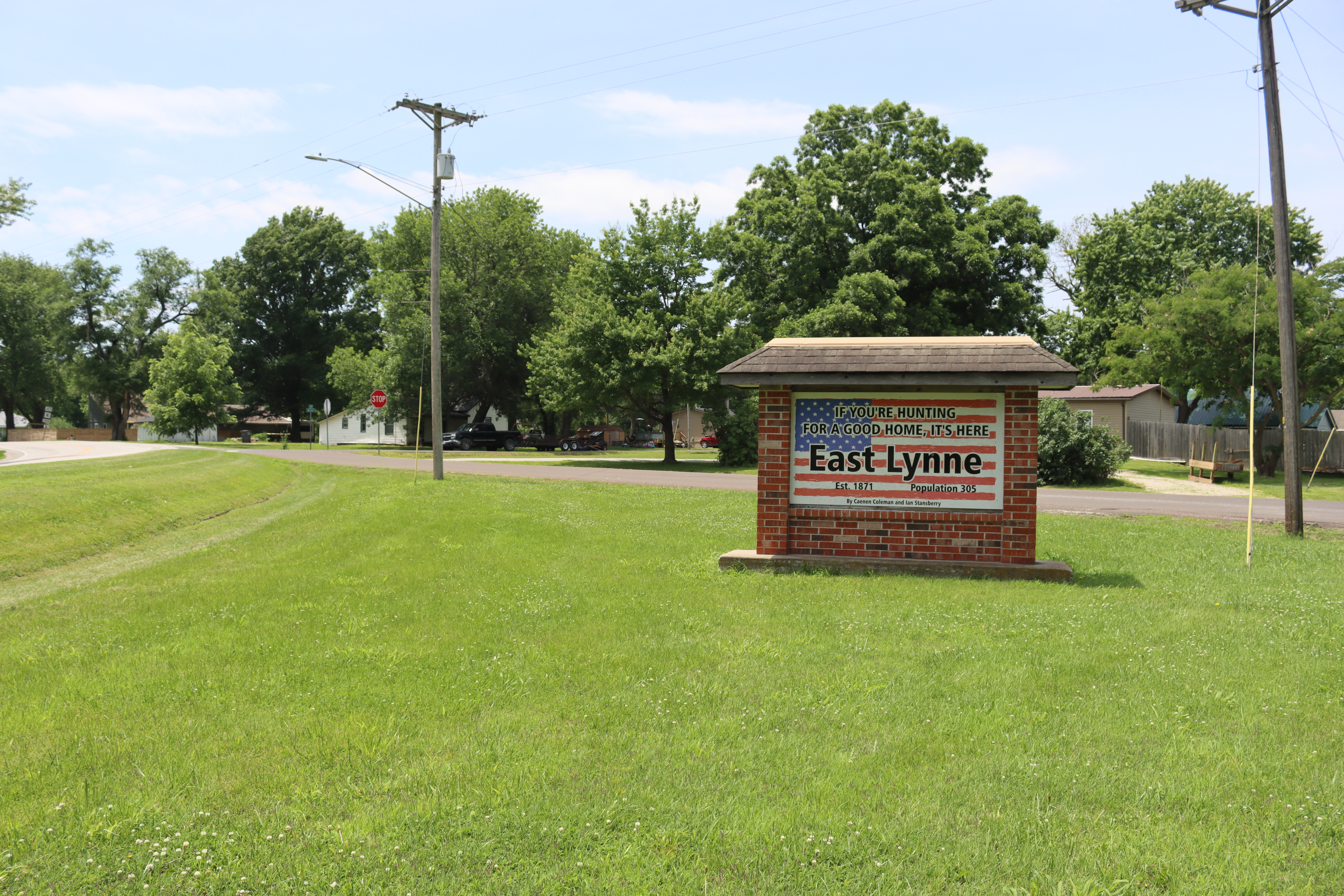
A welcome sign north of the city

East Lynne is located six miles east of Harrisonville on Missouri Route K. The site is on the Missouri–Kansas–Texas Railroad and the St. Louis–San Francisco Railway lines. Gunn City is three miles to the east along the Missouri–Kansas–Texas line. Camp Branch flows past the north side of the community.

According to the United States Census Bureau, the city has a total area of 0.33 square miles (0.85 km^{2}), all land.

== Demographics ==
Historical population
Census	Pop.	Note	%±
1880	195		—
1900	353		—
1910	277		−21.5%
1920	298		7.6%
1930	257		−13.8%
1940	236		−8.2%
1950	204		−13.6%
1960	243		19.1%
1970	255		4.9%
1980	286		12.2%
1990	289		1.0%
2000	300		3.8%
2010	303		1.0%
2020	294		−3.0%
U.S. Decennial Census

=== Racial and ethnic composition ===
East Lynne city, Missouri – Racial and ethnic composition Note: the US Census treats Hispanic/Latino as an ethnic category. This table excludes Latinos from the racial categories and assigns them to a separate category. Hispanics/Latinos may be of any race.
Race / Ethnicity (NH = Non-Hispanic)	Pop 2000	Pop 2010	Pop 2020	% 2000	% 2010	% 2020
White alone (NH)	291	290	260	97.00%	95.71%	88.44%
Black or African American alone (NH)	0	1	0	0.00%	0.33%	0.00%
Native American or Alaska Native alone (NH)	2	1	0	0.67%	0.33%	0.00%
Asian alone (NH)	0	0	1	0.00%	0.00%	0.34%
Native Hawaiian or Pacific Islander alone (NH)	0	0	0	0.00%	0.00%	0.00%
Other race alone (NH)	0	0	1	0.00%	0.00%	0.34%
Mixed race or Multiracial (NH)	4	6	26	1.33%	1.98%	8.84%
Hispanic or Latino (any race)	3	5	6	1.00%	1.65%	2.04%
Total	300	303	294	100.00%	100.00%	100.00%

=== 2010 census ===
As of the census of 2010, there were 303 people, 107 households, and 75 families living in the city. The population density was 918.2 inhabitants per square mile (354.5/km^{2}). There were 115 housing units at an average density of 348.5 per square mile (134.6/km^{2}). The racial makeup of the city was 97.4% White, 0.3% African American, 0.3% Native American, and 2.0% from two or more races. Hispanic or Latino of any race were 1.7% of the population.

There were 107 households, of which 42.1% had children under the age of 18 living with them, 49.5% were married couples living together, 15.0% had a female householder with no husband present, 5.6% had a male householder with no wife present, and 29.9% were non-families. 24.3% of all households were made up of individuals, and 12.2% had someone living alone who was 65 years of age or older. The average household size was 2.83 and the average family size was 3.40.

The median age in the city was 31.9 years. 32.3% of residents were under the age of 18; 6% were between the ages of 18 and 24; 29% were from 25 to 44; 19.6% were from 45 to 64; and 13.2% were 65 years of age or older. The gender makeup of the city was 53.1% male and 46.9% female.

=== 2000 census ===
As of the census of 2000, there were 300 people, 107 households, and 75 families living in the city. The population density was 1,066.9 inhabitants per square mile (411.9/km^{2}). There were 115 housing units at an average density of 409.0 per square mile (157.9/km^{2}). The racial makeup of the city was 97.67% White, 0.67% Native American, and 1.67% from two or more races. Hispanic or Latino of any race were 1.00% of the population.

There were 107 households, out of which 42.1% had children under the age of 18 living with them, 57.0% were married couples living together, 5.6% had a female householder with no husband present, and 29.9% were non-families. 25.2% of all households were made up of individuals, and 12.1% had someone living alone who was 65 years of age or older. The average household size was 2.80 and the average family size was 3.40.

In the city, the population was spread out, with 31.7% under the age of 18, 10.0% from 18 to 24, 30.3% from 25 to 44, 16.7% from 45 to 64, and 11.3% who were 65 years of age or older. The median age was 34 years. For every 100 females, there were 101.3 males. For every 100 females age 18 and over, there were 107.1 males.

The median income for a household in the city was $38,472, and the median income for a family was $46,875. Males had a median income of $29,167 versus $21,042 for females. The per capita income for the city was $14,055. About 2.7% of families and 6.1% of the population were below the poverty line, including 5.1% of those under the age of eighteen and 8.3% of those 65 or over.

== Education ==
It is in the East Lynne 40 School District, an elementary school district.

Metropolitan Community College has the East Lynne school district area in its service area, but not its in-district taxation area.
