= Jaudon, Missouri =

Unincorporated community in Missouri, U.S.

Coordinates: 38°45′34″N 94°35′22″W

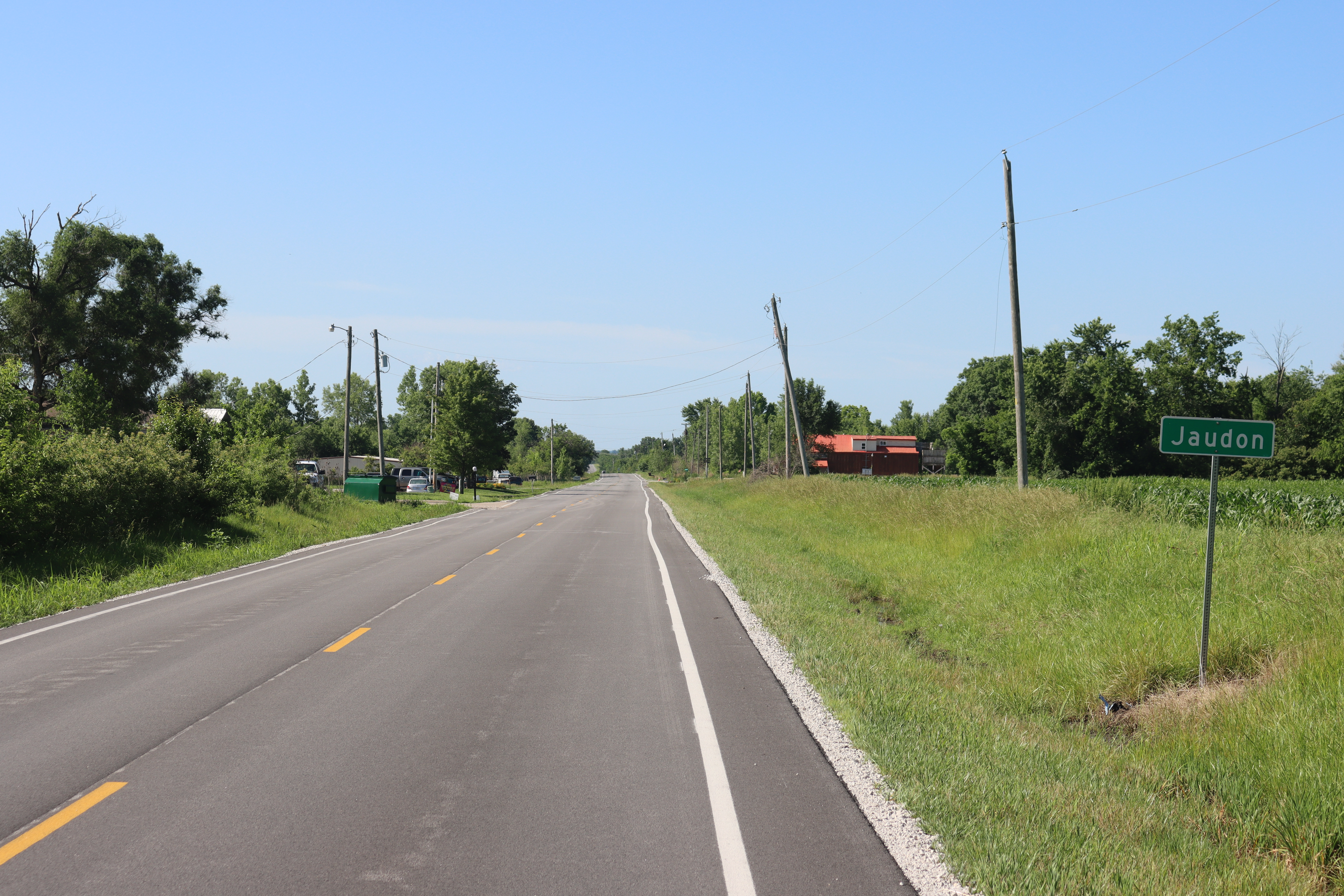
Jaudon sign on Route D, facing south

Jaudon is an unincorporated community in western Cass County, in the U.S. state of Missouri and is part of the Kansas City metropolitan area.

The community is one mile from the Missouri-Kansas border and is located on Missouri Route D just west of the Kansas City Southern Railway line. Belton is 4.5 miles (7.2 km) to the northeast.

== History ==
A post office was established at Jaudon in 1892, and remained in operation until 1914. The community was named after James A. Jaudon, the original owner of the site.
