= Kingsville Township, Johnson County, Missouri =

Township in Johnson County, Missouri, U.S.

Coordinates: 38.742758°N 94.077397°W

Kingsville Township is an inactive township in Johnson County, in the U.S. state of Missouri.

Kingsville Township was established in 1870, taking its name from the community of Kingsville, Missouri.
