= Lone Tree, Missouri =

Unincorporated community in Missouri, U.S.

Coordinates: 38°34′20″N 94°21′40″W

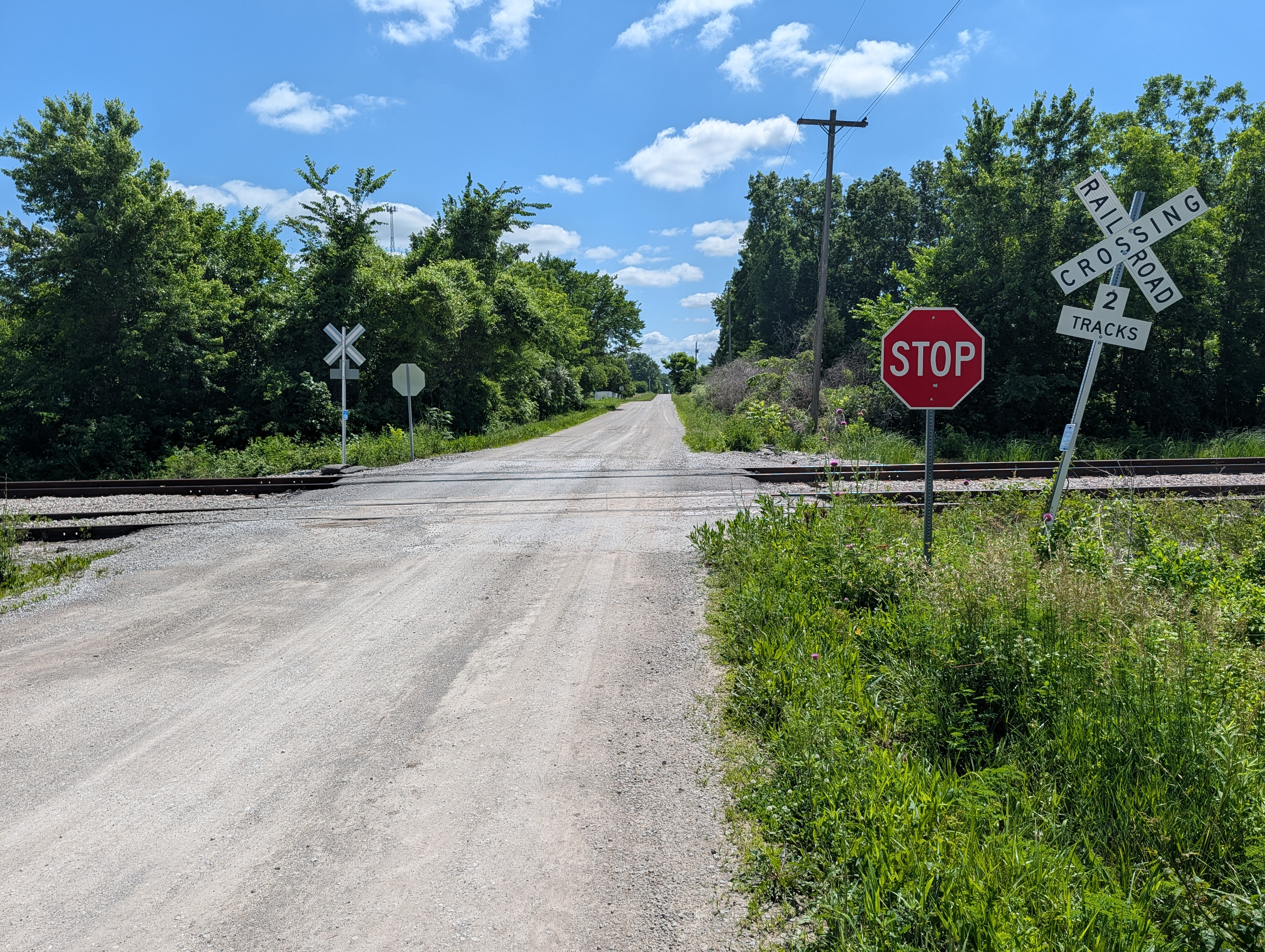
The intersection of 299th street and the MNA Railroad at Lone Tree

Lone Tree is an unincorporated community in Cass County, in the U.S. state of Missouri.

== History ==
A post office called Lonetree was established in 1883, and remained in operation until 1916. The community took its name from a large individual oak tree near the original town site.
