= Daugherty, Missouri =

Populated place in Missouri, U.S.

Coordinates: 38°36′13″N 94°16′54″W

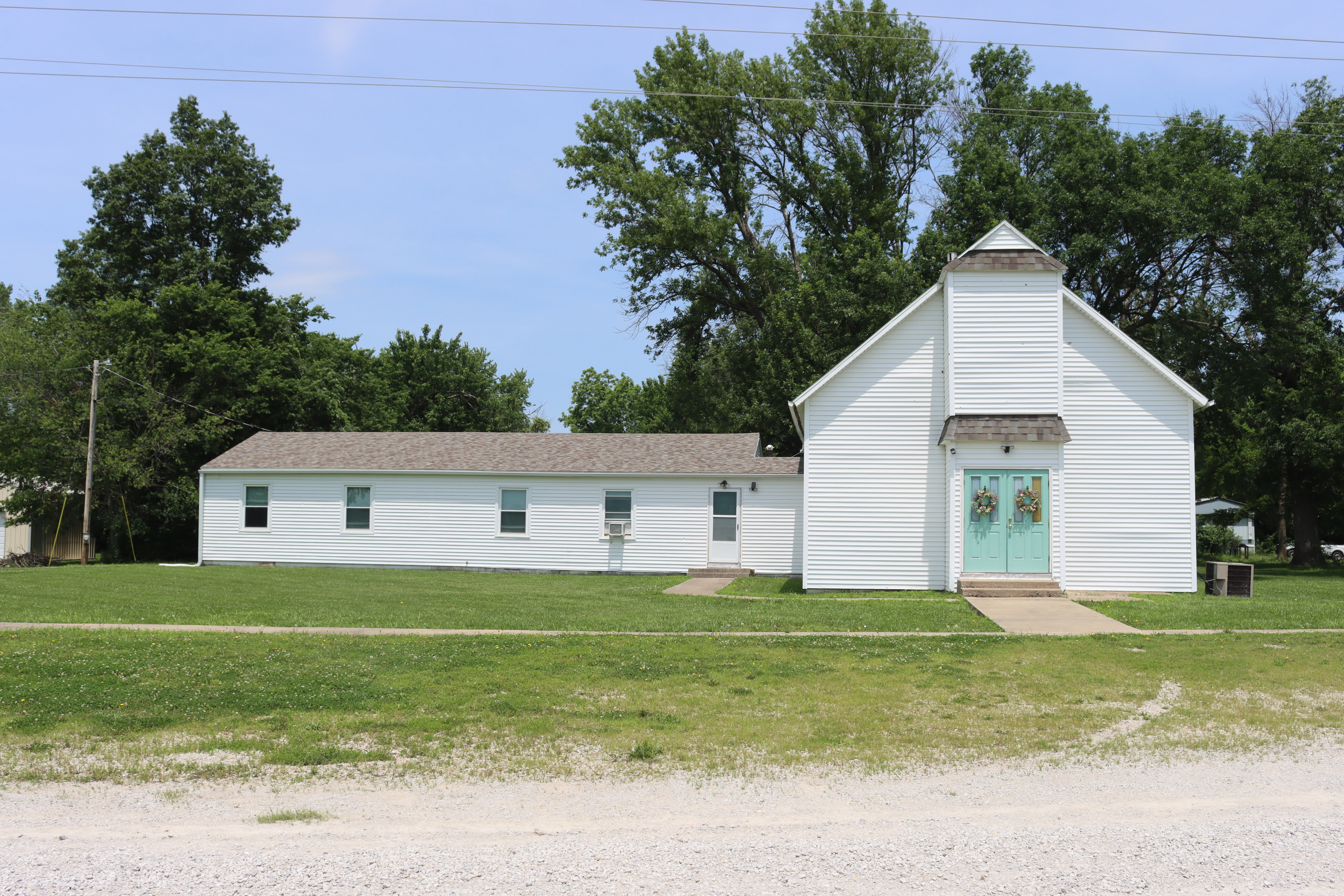
Salvation Lutheran Church in Daugherty

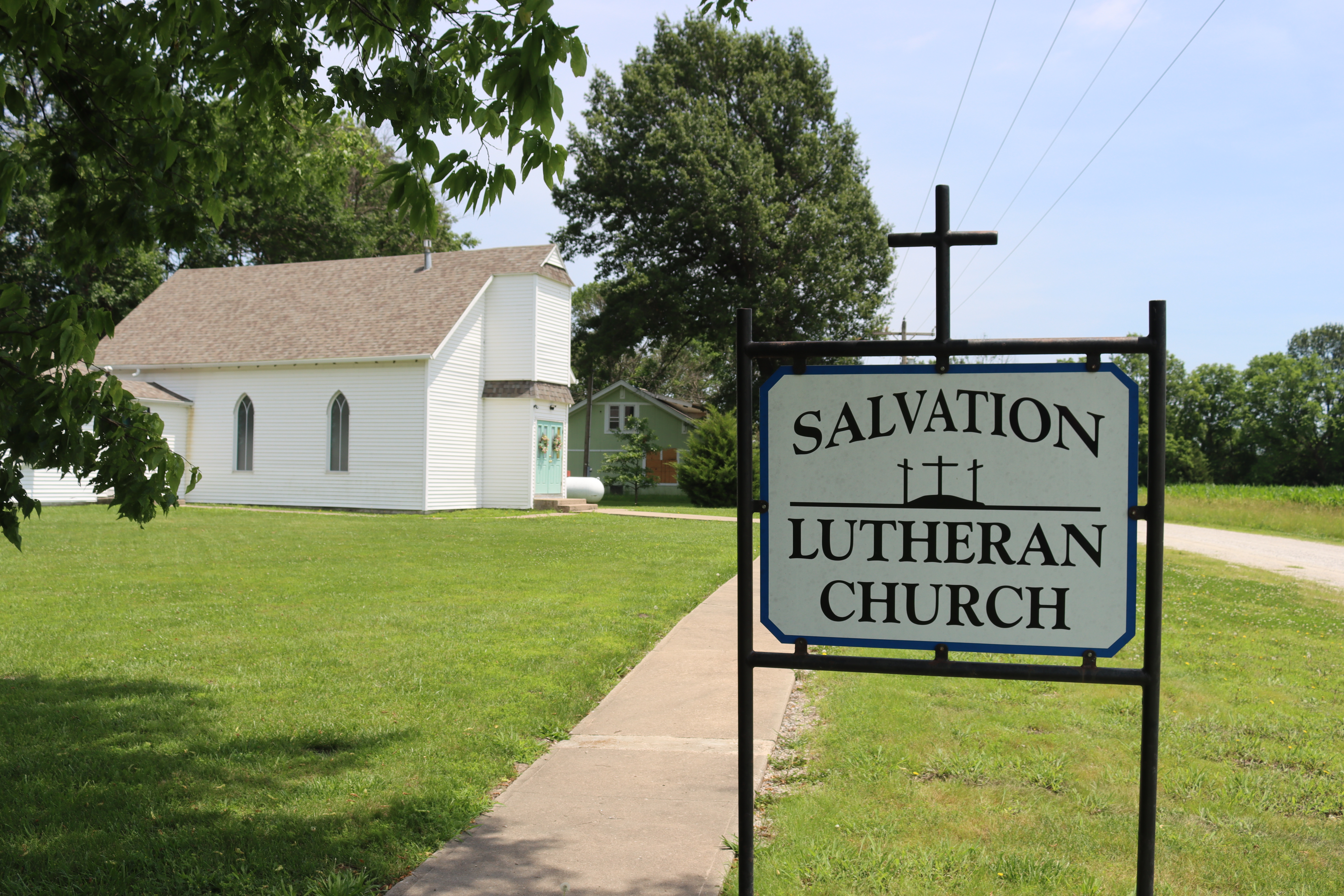
Sign for the Salvation Lutheran Church

Daugherty is a populated place in central Cass County, in the U.S. state of Missouri. The community is on Missouri Route 7 five miles southeast of Harrisonville and approximately 5.5 miles northwest of Garden City. The site is at an elevation of 892 feet and just west of Eight Mile Creek.

== History ==
Daugherty was platted in 1885, and named after James Daugherty, one of the founders. A variant name was "Eight Mile". A post office called Eight Mile was established in 1877, and remained in operation until 1935.
