= Coleman, Missouri =

Coleman
- Unincorporated Community
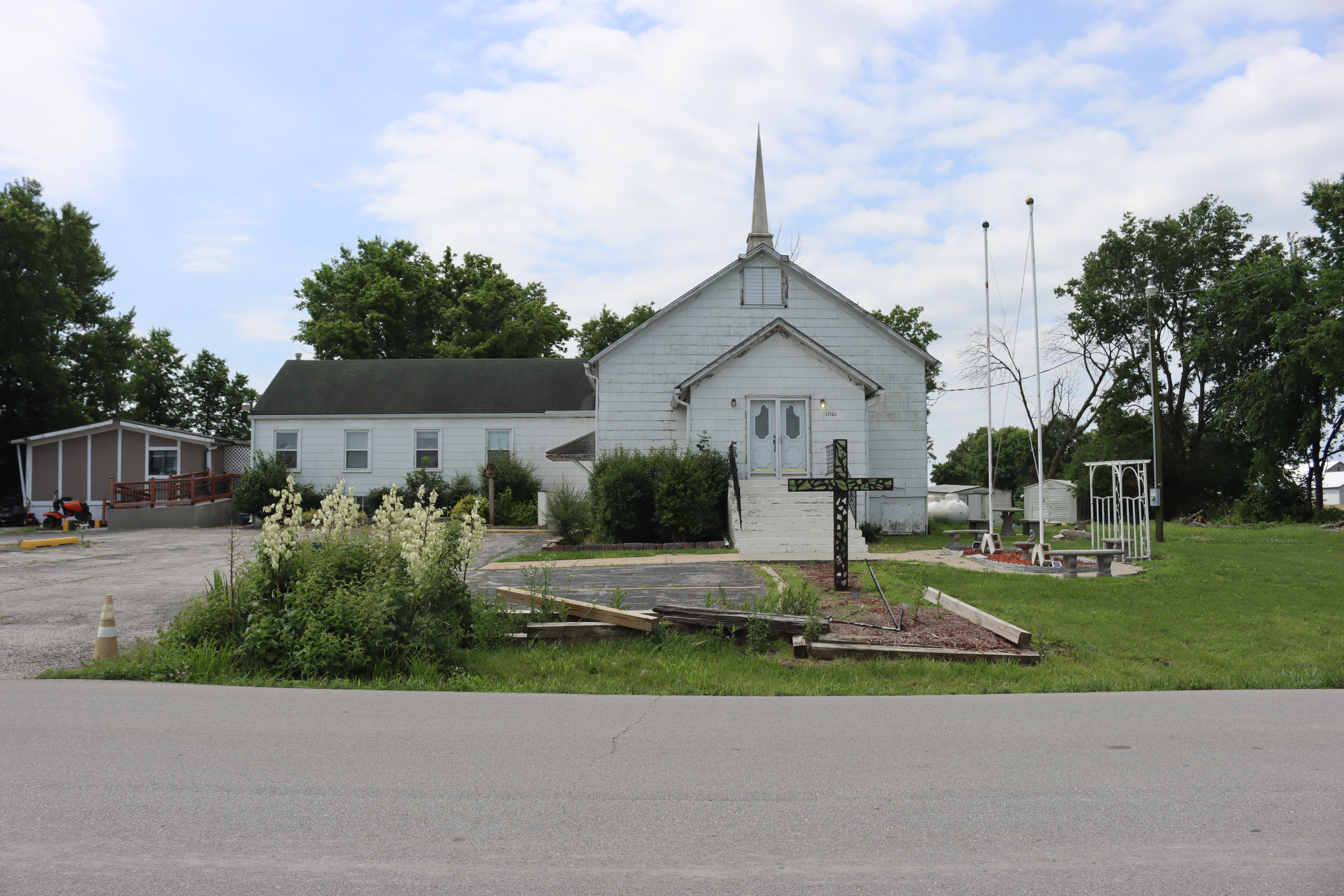
- Coleman Baptist Church
- Interactive map of Coleman
- Coordinates: 38°45′05″N 94°23′41″W
- Country: United States
- State: Missouri
- County: Cass County
- Elevation: 1,017 ft (310 m)
- Area code: 816

Coleman is an unincorporated community in Cass County, in the U.S. state of Missouri.

== History ==
A post office called Coleman was established in 1886, and remained in operation until 1926. The community has the name of Jack Coleman, the original owner of the town site.
