= Main City, Missouri =

Unincorporated community in Missouri, U.S.

Coordinates: 38°29′22″N 94°29′32″W

Main City is an unincorporated community in Cass County, in the U.S. state of Missouri.

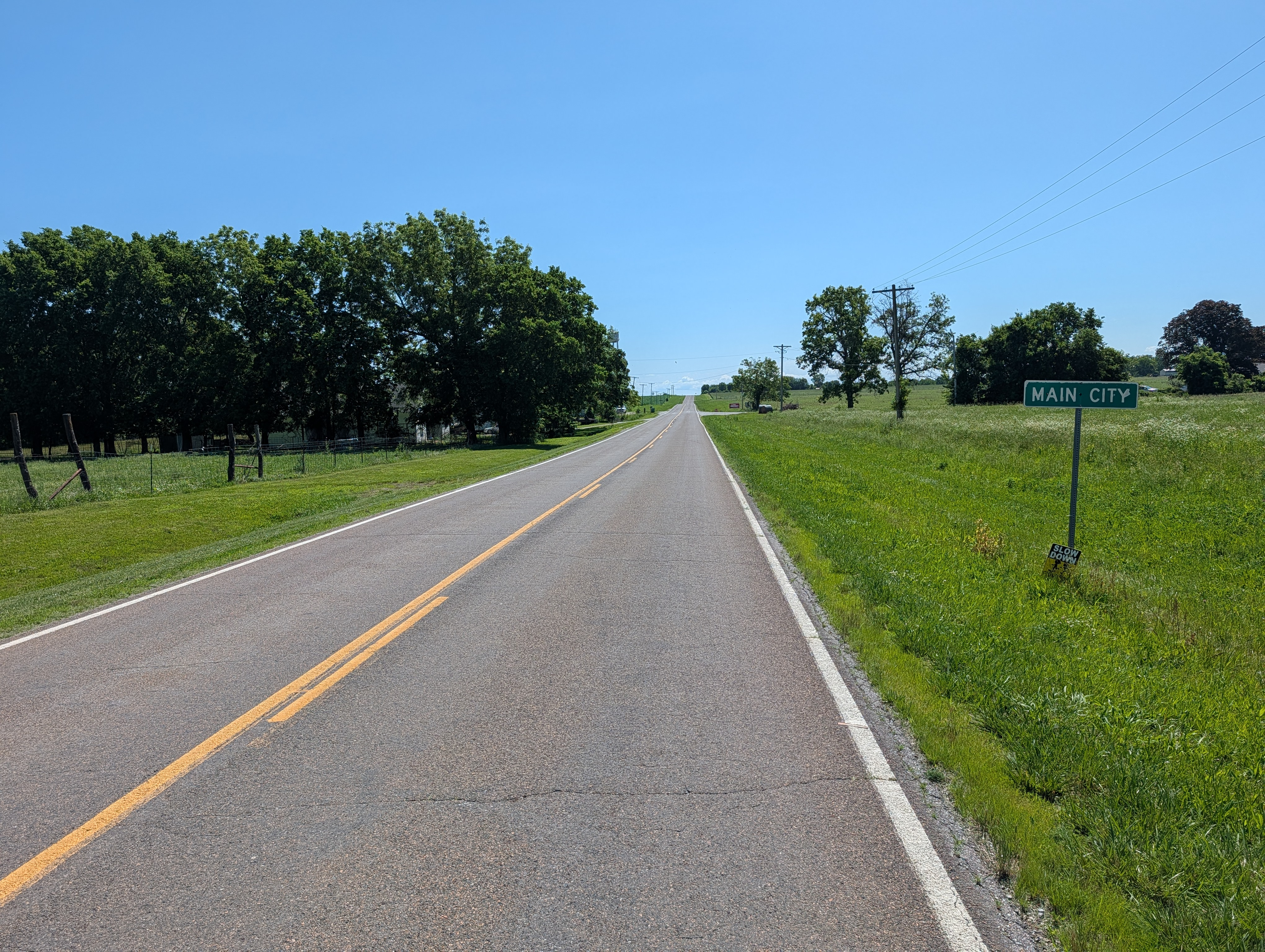
MoDOT sign on Route A

== History ==
Main City was platted in 1879, and named in honor of William Main, local landowner. A post office called Main City was established in 1879, and remained in operation until 1906.
