= Cleveland, Missouri =

- City
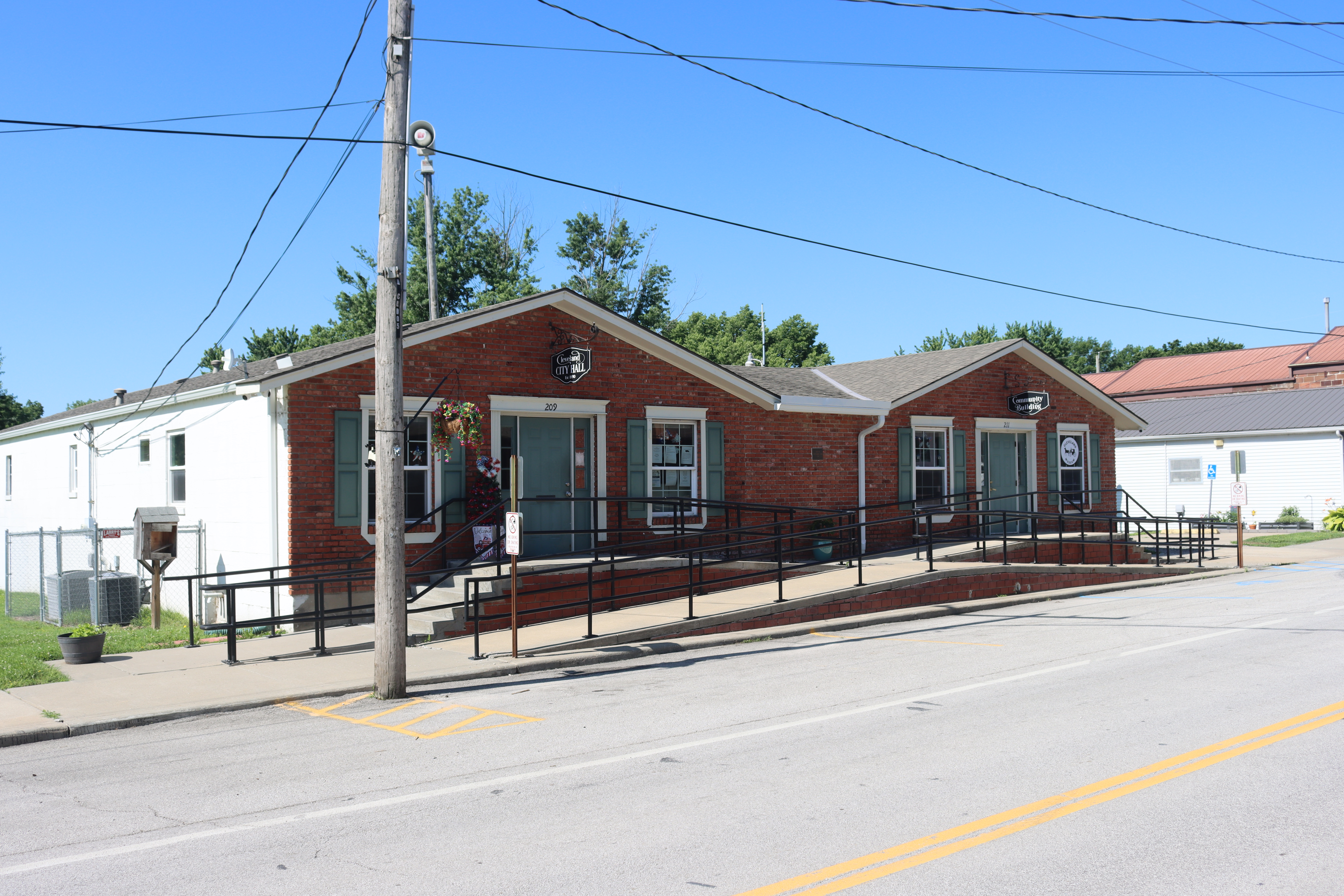
- Cleveland City Hall and Community Building

- Location of Cleveland, Missouri
- Coordinates: 38°40′44″N 94°35′53″W
- Country: United States
- State: Missouri
- County: Cass

Area
  - Total: 1.51 sq mi (3.90 km^{2})
  - Land: 1.49 sq mi (3.85 km^{2})
  - Water: 0.019 sq mi (0.05 km^{2})
- Elevation: 988 ft (301 m)

Population (2020)
  - Total: 650
  - Density: 437.4/sq mi (168.89/km^{2})
- Time zone: UTC-6 (Central (CST))
  - Summer (DST): UTC-5 (CDT)
- ZIP code: 64734
- Area codes: 816, 975
- FIPS code: 29-14770
- GNIS feature ID: 2393561
- Website: clevelandmo.com

Cleveland is a city in Cass County, Missouri, United States. The population was 650 at the 2020 census. It is part of the Kansas City metropolitan area.

== History ==
Cleveland was originally called Maxwell, and under the latter name was platted in 1890 by Thomas T. Maxwell. The present name is after President Grover Cleveland. A post office called Cleveland has been in operation since 1890.

== Geography ==
Cleveland is located at 38°40′33″N 94°35′43″W (38.675829, -94.595229).

According to the United States Census Bureau, the city has a total area of 1.50 square miles (3.88 km^{2}), of which 1.48 square miles (3.83 km^{2}) is land and 0.02 square miles (0.05 km^{2}) is water.

== Demographics ==
Historical population
Census	Pop.	Note	%±
1910	170		—
1920	169		−0.6%
1930	159		−5.9%
1940	146		−8.2%
1950	163		11.6%
1960	216		32.5%
1970	256		18.5%
1980	485		89.5%
1990	506		4.3%
2000	592		17.0%
2010	661		11.7%
2020	650		−1.7%
U.S. Decennial Census

=== Racial and ethnic composition ===
Cleveland city, Missouri – Racial and ethnic composition Note: the US Census treats Hispanic/Latino as an ethnic category. This table excludes Latinos from the racial categories and assigns them to a separate category. Hispanics/Latinos may be of any race.
Race / Ethnicity (NH = Non-Hispanic)	Pop 2000	Pop 2010	Pop 2020	% 2000	% 2010	% 2020
White alone (NH)	566	620	592	95.61%	93.80%	91.08%
Black or African American alone (NH)	1	1	1	0.17%	0.15%	0.15%
Native American or Alaska Native alone (NH)	8	4	8	1.35%	0.61%	1.23%
Asian alone (NH)	5	6	6	0.84%	0.91%	0.92%
Native Hawaiian or Pacific Islander alone (NH)	0	0	0	0.00%	0.00%	0.00%
Other race alone (NH)	0	0	6	0.00%	0.00%	0.92%
Mixed race or Multiracial (NH)	4	16	24	0.68%	2.42%	3.69%
Hispanic or Latino (any race)	8	14	13	1.35%	2.12%	2.00%
Total	592	661	650	100.00%	100.00%	100.00%

=== 2010 census ===
As of the census of 2010, there were 661 people, 250 households, and 196 families living in the city. The population density was 446.6 inhabitants per square mile (172.4/km^{2}). There were 260 housing units at an average density of 175.7 per square mile (67.8/km^{2}). The racial makeup of the city was 95.6% White, 0.2% African American, 0.9% Native American, 0.9% Asian, and 2.4% from two or more races. Hispanic or Latino of any race were 2.1% of the population.

There were 250 households, of which 37.6% had children under the age of 18 living with them, 63.2% were married couples living together, 8.8% had a female householder with no husband present, 6.4% had a male householder with no wife present, and 21.6% were non-families. 18.4% of all households were made up of individuals, and 7.2% had someone living alone who was 65 years of age or older. The average household size was 2.64 and the average family size was 2.99.

The median age in the city was 40.9 years. 25.3% of residents were under the age of 18; 5% were between the ages of 18 and 24; 25.5% were from 25 to 44; 31.1% were from 45 to 64; and 13% were 65 years of age or older. The gender makeup of the city was 51.6% male and 48.4% female.

=== 2000 census ===
As of the census of 2000, there were 592 people, 212 households, and 165 families living in the city. The population density was 377.1 inhabitants per square mile (145.6/km^{2}). There were 226 housing units at an average density of 144.0 per square mile (55.6/km^{2}). The racial makeup of the city was 96.45% White, 0.17% African American, 1.52% Native American, 0.84% Asian, and 1.01% from two or more races. Hispanic or Latino of any race were 1.35% of the population.

There were 212 households, out of which 35.8% had children under the age of 18 living with them, 69.3% were married couples living together, 6.1% had a female householder with no husband present, and 21.7% were non-families. 17.9% of all households were made up of individuals, and 7.5% had someone living alone who was 65 years of age or older. The average household size was 2.79 and the average family size was 3.17.

In the city the population was spread out, with 29.1% under the age of 18, 5.4% from 18 to 24, 30.6% from 25 to 44, 26.7% from 45 to 64, and 8.3% who were 65 years of age or older. The median age was 37 years. For every 100 females, there were 109.2 males. For every 100 females age 18 and over, there were 99.1 males.

The median income for a household in the city was $54,722, and the median income for a family was $56,000. Males had a median income of $41,250 versus $26,346 for females. The per capita income for the city was $19,064. About 5.2% of families and 4.9% of the population were below the poverty line, including 3.9% of those under age 18 and none of those age 65 or over.

== Education ==
It is in the Midway R-I School District.

Metropolitan Community College has the Midway school district area in its service area, but not its in-district taxation area.
