= Lisle, Missouri =

Unincorporated community in Missouri, U.S.

Coordinates: 38°32′58″N 94°35′41″W

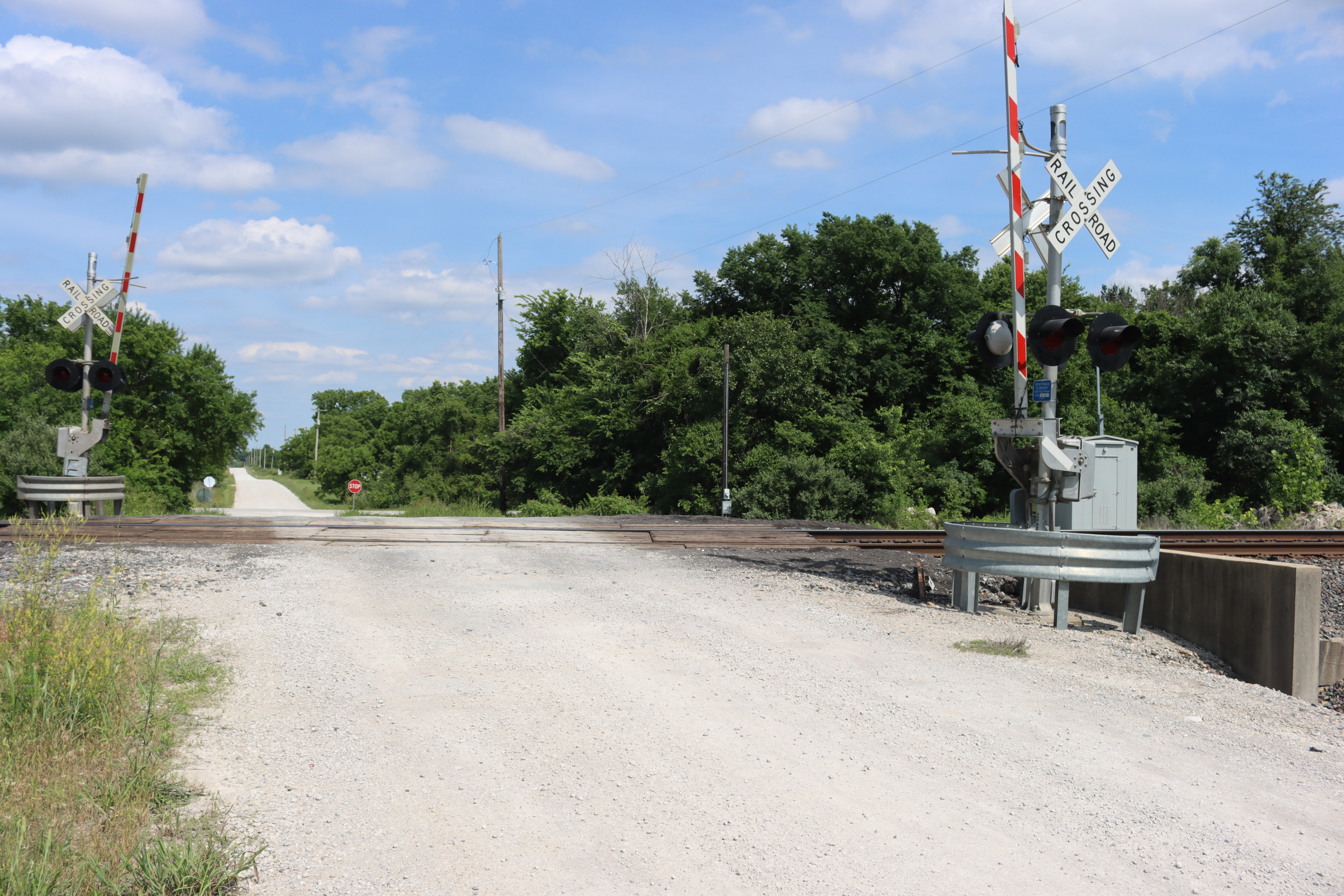
The intersection of 315th street and the CPKC Railroad in Lisle with State Route D in the background

Lisle is an unincorporated community in western Cass County, in the U.S. state of Missouri. It is part of the Kansas City metropolitan area.

The community lies within one mile of the Missouri-Kansas state line. It is on Missouri Route D between Drexel to the south and West Line to the north. Coldwater Creek lies to the south and east and its tributary, Cave Spring Creek, is to the north.

== History ==
Lisle was platted in 1892 and named after J. D. Lisle, the original owner of the town site. A post office called Lisle was established in 1891, and remained in operation until 1954.
