= Lake Annette, Missouri =

- City
- Location of Lake Annette, Missouri
- Coordinates: 38°39′16″N 94°30′29″W
- Country: United States
- State: Missouri
- County: Cass
- Incorporated: 1982

Area
  - Total: 0.22 sq mi (0.57 km^{2})
  - Land: 0.15 sq mi (0.40 km^{2})
  - Water: 0.066 sq mi (0.17 km^{2})
- Elevation: 846 ft (258 m)

Population (2020)
  - Total: 107
  - Density: 687.6/sq mi (265.48/km^{2})
- Time zone: UTC-6 (Central (CST))
  - Summer (DST): UTC-5 (CDT)
- ZIP code: 64746
- Area code: 816
- FIPS code: 29-39845
- GNIS feature ID: 2395585
- Website: City of Lake Annette, Missouri

Lake Annette is a city in Cass County, Missouri, United States. The population was 107 at the 2020 census. It is part of the Kansas City metropolitan area.

== Etymology ==
The name of the lake comes from the name of Ed and Anne Pruitt's daughter, Annette, who was born the same night the lake was first filled. This happened on March 22, 1957, as a large rain storm filled, and even overflowed, the new lake. The city took this name at its incorporation in 1982.

== Geography ==
According to the United States Census Bureau, the city has a total area of 0.23 square miles (0.60 km^{2}), of which 0.16 square miles (0.41 km^{2}) is land and 0.07 square miles (0.18 km^{2}) is water.

== Demographics ==
Historical population
| Census | Pop. | Note | %± |
|---|---|---|---|
| 1990 | 157 | | — |
| 2000 | 163 | | 3.8% |
| 2010 | 100 | | −38.7% |
| 2020 | 107 | | 7.0% |
U.S. Decennial Census

=== Racial and ethnic composition ===
Lake Annette city, Missouri – Racial and ethnic composition Note: the US Census treats Hispanic/Latino as an ethnic category. This table excludes Latinos from the racial categories and assigns them to a separate category. Hispanics/Latinos may be of any race.
| Race / Ethnicity (NH = Non-Hispanic) | Pop 2000 | Pop 2010 | Pop 2020 | % 2000 | % 2010 | % 2020 |
|---|---|---|---|---|---|---|
| White alone (NH) | 153 | 90 | 92 | 93.87% | 90.00% | 85.98% |
| Black or African American alone (NH) | 2 | 0 | 0 | 1.23% | 0.00% | 0.00% |
| Native American or Alaska Native alone (NH) | 2 | 1 | 0 | 1.23% | 1.00% | 0.00% |
| Asian alone (NH) | 0 | 0 | 1 | 0.00% | 0.00% | 0.93% |
| Native Hawaiian or Pacific Islander alone (NH) | 0 | 0 | 0 | 0.00% | 0.00% | 0.00% |
| Other race alone (NH) | 0 | 0 | 0 | 0.00% | 0.00% | 0.00% |
| Mixed race or Multiracial (NH) | 3 | 7 | 11 | 1.84% | 7.00% | 10.28% |
| Hispanic or Latino (any race) | 3 | 2 | 3 | 1.84% | 2.00% | 2.80% |
| Total | 163 | 100 | 107 | 100.00% | 100.00% | 100.00% |

=== 2010 census ===
As of the census of 2010, there were 100 people, 49 households, and 25 families living in the city. The population density was 625.0 inhabitants per square mile (241.3/km^{2}). There were 81 housing units at an average density of 506.3 per square mile (195.5/km^{2}). The racial makeup of the city was 92.0% White, 1.0% Native American, and 7.0% from two or more races. Hispanic or Latino of any race were 2.0% of the population.

There were 49 households, of which 16.3% had children under the age of 18 living with them, 36.7% were married couples living together, 6.1% had a female householder with no husband present, 8.2% had a male householder with no wife present, and 49.0% were non-families. 38.8% of all households were made up of individuals, and 16.3% had someone living alone who was 65 years of age or older. The average household size was 2.04 and the average family size was 2.56.

The median age in the city was 46 years. 13% of residents were under the age of 18; 9% were between the ages of 18 and 24; 26% were from 25 to 44; 33% were from 45 to 64; and 19% were 65 years of age or older. The gender makeup of the city was 49.0% male and 51.0% female.

=== 2000 census ===
As of the census of 2000, there were 163 people, 83 households, and 41 families living in the city. The population density was 1,033.5 inhabitants per square mile (399.0/km^{2}). There were 110 housing units at an average density of 697.4 per square mile (269.3/km^{2}). The racial makeup of the city was 95.09% White, 1.23% African American, 1.84% Native American, and 1.84% from two or more races. Hispanic or Latino of any race were 1.84% of the population.

There were 83 households, out of which 18.1% had children under the age of 18 living with them, 38.6% were married couples living together, 6.0% had a female householder with no husband present, and 49.4% were non-families. 41.0% of all households were made up of individuals, and 9.6% had someone living alone who was 65 years of age or older. The average household size was 1.96 and the average family size was 2.64.

In the city the population was spread out, with 17.2% under the age of 18, 6.7% from 18 to 24, 28.2% from 25 to 44, 35.0% from 45 to 64, and 12.9% who were 65 years of age or older. The median age was 44 years. For every 100 females, there were 129.6 males. For every 100 females age 18 and over, there were 128.8 males.

The median income for a household in the city was $22,292, and the median income for a family was $35,417. Males had a median income of $32,500 versus $17,292 for females. The per capita income for the city was $18,623. About 19.4% of families and 23.4% of the population were below the poverty line, including 66.7% of those under the age of eighteen and 10.5% of those 65 or over.

== Education ==
It is in the Midway R-I School District.

Metropolitan Community College has the Midway school district area in its service area, but not its in-district taxation area.
