= Kingsville =

Kingsville may refer to:

== Australia ==
- Kingsville, Victoria

== Canada ==
- Kingsville, Ontario

== United States ==
- Kingsville, Maryland
- Kingsville, Missouri
- Kingsville, Ohio
- Kingsville, Texas
- Kingsville, Utah, now Clawson
- Kingsville, Virginia

== See also ==
- Kingsville Township (disambiguation)
