= Baldwin Park, Missouri =

- Village
- Location of Baldwin Park, Missouri
- Coordinates: 38°47′38″N 94°14′48″W
- Country: United States
- State: Missouri
- County: Cass

Area
  - Total: 0.12 sq mi (0.31 km^{2})
  - Land: 0.077 sq mi (0.20 km^{2})
  - Water: 0.042 sq mi (0.11 km^{2})
- Elevation: 879 ft (268 m)

Population (2020)
  - Total: 85
  - Density: 1,120.0/sq mi (432.43/km^{2})
- Time zone: UTC-6 (Central (CST))
  - Summer (DST): UTC-5 (CDT)
- FIPS code: 29-03124
- GNIS feature ID: 2398023

Baldwin Park is a village in Cass County, Missouri, United States. The population was 85 at the 2020 census. It is part of the Kansas City metropolitan area.

== Geography ==
Baldwin Park surrounds what was once Baldwin Lake until it was drained. It is surrounded by Pleasant Hill. The village pays its taxes to Cass County and receives its funding from county, state and federal taxes. As of the 2010 Census, the Population of Baldwin Park was 92. The village has its own Mayor and Board of Trustees, consisting of four members. As of October 2012, the estimated 2.5 miles of roads were redone. It resides within the Pleasant Hill School District boundaries.

According to the United States Census Bureau, the village has a total area of 0.12 square miles (0.31 km^{2}), of which 0.08 square miles (0.21 km^{2}) is land and 0.04 square miles (0.10 km^{2}) is water.

== Demographics ==
Historical population
Census	Pop.	Note	%±
1980	126		—
1990	85		−32.5%
2000	115		35.3%
2010	92		−20.0%
2020	85		−7.6%
U.S. Decennial Census

=== Racial and ethnic composition ===
Baldwin Park village, Missouri – Racial and ethnic composition Note: the US Census treats Hispanic/Latino as an ethnic category. This table excludes Latinos from the racial categories and assigns them to a separate category. Hispanics/Latinos may be of any race.
Race / Ethnicity (NH = Non-Hispanic)	Pop 2000	Pop 2010	Pop 2020	% 2000	% 2010	% 2020
White alone (NH)	113	89	72	98.26%	96.74%	84.71%
Black or African American alone (NH)	0	0	1	0.00%	0.00%	1.18%
Native American or Alaska Native alone (NH)	1	1	1	0.87%	1.09%	1.18%
Asian alone (NH)	0	1	0	0.00%	1.09%	0.00%
Native Hawaiian or Pacific Islander alone (NH)	0	0	0	0.00%	0.00%	0.00%
Other race alone (NH)	0	0	0	0.00%	0.00%	0.00%
Mixed race or Multiracial (NH)	0	1	6	0.00%	1.09%	7.06%
Hispanic or Latino (any race)	1	0	5	0.87%	0.00%	5.88%
Total	115	92	85	100.00%	100.00%	100.00%

=== 2010 census ===
As of the census of 2010, there were 92 people, 38 households, and 23 families living in the village. The population density was 1,150.0 inhabitants per square mile (444.0/km^{2}). There were 40 housing units at an average density of 500.0 per square mile (193.1/km^{2}). The racial makeup of the village was 96.7% White, 1.1% Native American, 1.1% Asian, and 1.1% from two or more races.

There were 38 households, of which 34.2% had children under the age of 18 living with them, 36.8% were married couples living together, 7.9% had a female householder with no husband present, 15.8% had a male householder with no wife present, and 39.5% were non-families. 34.2% of all households were made up of individuals, and 15.8% had someone living alone who was 65 years of age or older. The average household size was 2.42 and the average family size was 3.00.

The median age in the village was 38 years. 25% of residents were under the age of 18; 6.5% were between the ages of 18 and 24; 28.3% were from 25 to 44; 32.6% were from 45 to 64; and 7.6% were 65 years of age or older. The gender makeup of the village was 47.8% male and 52.2% female.

=== 2000 census ===
As of the census of 2000, there were 115 people, 41 households, and 27 families living in the village. The population density was 1,639.7 inhabitants per square mile (633.1/km^{2}). There were 44 housing units at an average density of 627.4 per square mile (242.2/km^{2}). The racial makeup of the village was 99.13% White and 0.87% Native American. Hispanic or Latino of any race were 0.87% of the population.

There were 41 households, out of which 39.0% had children under the age of 18 living with them, 43.9% were married couples living together, 19.5% had a female householder with no husband present, and 34.1% were non-families. 19.5% of all households were made up of individuals, and 9.8% had someone living alone who was 65 years of age or older. The average household size was 2.80 and the average family size was 3.26.

In the village, the population was spread out, with 36.5% under the age of 18, 2.6% from 18 to 24, 36.5% from 25 to 44, 18.3% from 45 to 64, and 6.1% who were 65 years of age or older. The median age was 34 years. For every 100 females, there were 94.9 males. For every 100 females age 18 and over, there were 73.8 males.

The median income for a household in the village was $40,208, and the median income for a family was $38,125. Males had a median income of $35,000 versus $17,292 for females. The per capita income for the village was $22,489. There were no families and 8.8% of the population living below the poverty line, including no under-eighteens and none of those over 64.

== Education ==
It is in the Pleasant Hill R-III School District.

Metropolitan Community College has the Pleasant Hill school district area in its service area, but not its in-district taxation area.
