= Pleasant Hill Historical Society Museum =

Pleasant Hill Historical Society Museum and Research Library
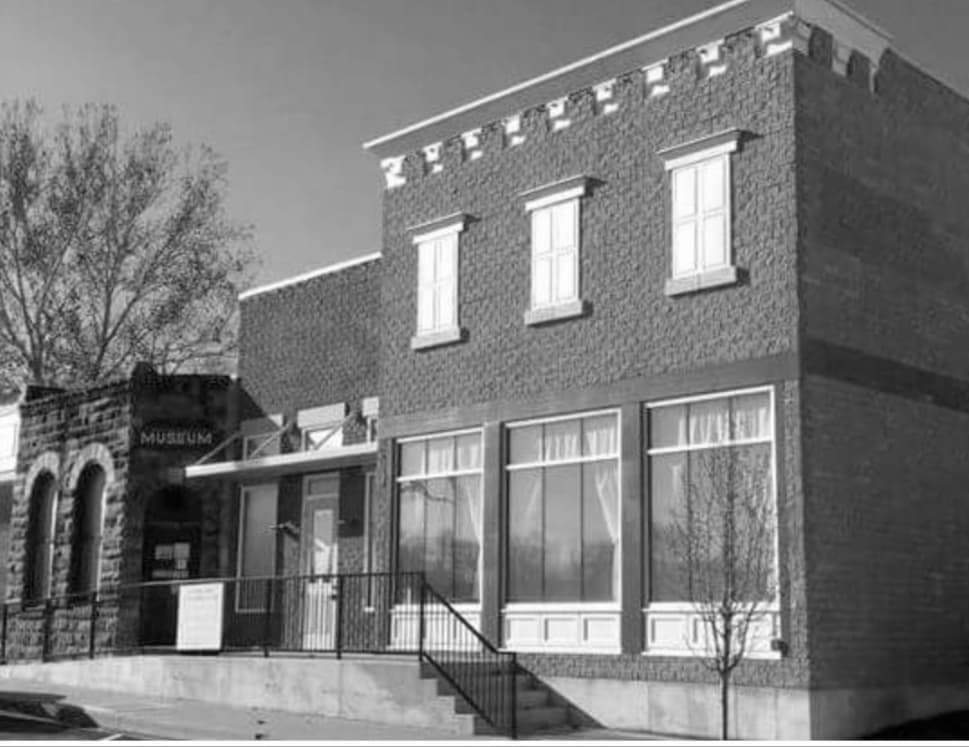
- The current Pleasant Hill Historical Society Museum
- Location: 125 Wyoming St., Pleasant Hill, Missouri, United States
- Coordinates: 38°47′7.0764″N 94°16′31.656″W
- Type: History museum

The Pleasant Hill Historical Society Museum is a public museum and research library located at 125 Wyoming St. in Pleasant Hill, Missouri. It features a collection of 8,000 indexed photographs dating back to the late 1880s, artifacts, and historical and genealogical resources from Pleasant Hill. The museum is not funded by the city of Pleasant Hill; its primary fundraiser is Railroad Days, which takes place annually in April.

The museum's facade includes elements of historic local buildings. The historical society and museum was a contributor to the development of the nomination for National Register of Historic Places listing of the Pleasant Hill Downtown Historic District. The district is adjacent, including 115 Wyoming St. and buildings on the other side; it includes 53 contributing buildings on 19.5 acres (7.9 ha).
