= Archie, Missouri =

- City
- Location of Archie, Missouri
- Coordinates: 38°28′51″N 94°21′04″W
- Country: United States
- State: Missouri
- County: Cass

Area
  - Total: 1.54 sq mi (3.98 km^{2})
  - Land: 1.50 sq mi (3.89 km^{2})
  - Water: 0.035 sq mi (0.09 km^{2})
- Elevation: 820 ft (250 m)

Population (2020)
  - Total: 1,268
  - Density: 845/sq mi (326.2/km^{2})
- Time zone: UTC-6 (Central (CST))
  - Summer (DST): UTC-5 (CDT)
- ZIP code: 64725
- Area codes: 816, 975
- FIPS code: 29-01702
- GNIS feature ID: 2393976
- Website: cityofarchie.org

Archie is a city in southern Cass County, Missouri, United States. The city is part of the Kansas City metropolitan statistical area. The population was 1,268 at the 2020 census.

== History ==
Archie was platted in 1880, and named after Archie Talmadge, the son of a railroad official. A post office has been in operation at Archie since 1880.

On August 10, 1932, a meteorite fell near Archie that received national attention. A fragment is on display in the Smithsonian National Museum of Natural History in Washington, D.C. The name of the meteorite is "Archie".

== Geography ==
Archie is located just north of the southern border of the county on Missouri Route A one-half mile west of U.S. Route 71. Harrisonville is 11 miles to the north along Route 71. The South Grand River flows past about 3/4 of a mile to the northeast.

According to the United States Census Bureau, the city has a total area of 1.20 square miles (3.11 km^{2}), of which 1.16 square miles (3.00 km^{2}) is land and 0.04 square miles (0.10 km^{2}) is water.

== Demographics ==
Historical population
Census	Pop.	Note	%±
1890	278		—
1900	285		2.5%
1910	246		−13.7%
1920	250		1.6%
1930	253		1.2%
1940	293		15.8%
1950	300		2.4%
1960	348		16.0%
1970	525		50.9%
1980	753		43.4%
1990	799		6.1%
2000	890		11.4%
2010	1,170		31.5%
2020	1,268		8.4%
U.S. Decennial Census

=== Racial and ethnic composition ===
Archie city, Missouri – Racial and ethnic composition Note: the US Census treats Hispanic/Latino as an ethnic category. This table excludes Latinos from the racial categories and assigns them to a separate category. Hispanics/Latinos may be of any race.
Race / Ethnicity (NH = Non-Hispanic)	Pop 2000	Pop 2010	Pop 2020	% 2000	% 2010	% 2020
White alone (NH)	878	1,123	1,115	98.65%	95.98%	87.93%
Black or African American alone (NH)	0	6	4	0.00%	0.51%	0.32%
Native American or Alaska Native alone (NH)	7	3	4	0.79%	0.26%	0.32%
Asian alone (NH)	0	2	0	0.00%	0.17%	0.00%
Native Hawaiian or Pacific Islander alone (NH)	0	3	1	0.00%	0.26%	0.08%
Other race alone (NH)	0	0	10	0.00%	0.00%	0.79%
Mixed race or Multiracial (NH)	2	10	85	0.22%	0.85%	6.70%
Hispanic or Latino (any race)	3	23	49	0.34%	1.97%	3.86%
Total	890	1,170	1,268	100.00%	100.00%	100.00%

=== 2010 census ===
As of the census of 2010, there were 1,170 people, 441 households, and 317 families living in the city. The population density was 1,008.6 inhabitants per square mile (389.4/km^{2}). There were 485 housing units at an average density of 418.1 per square mile (161.4/km^{2}). The racial makeup of the city was 96.9% White, 0.5% African American, 0.3% Native American, 0.2% Asian, 0.3% Pacific Islander, 0.9% from other races, and 1.0% from two or more races. Hispanic or Latino of any race were 2.0% of the population.

There were 441 households, of which 41.5% had children under the age of 18 living with them, 56.7% were married couples living together, 10.4% had a female householder with no husband present, 4.8% had a male householder with no wife present, and 28.1% were non-families. 24.7% of all households were made up of individuals, and 10% had someone living alone who was 65 years of age or older. The average household size was 2.65 and the average family size was 3.12.

The median age in the city was 33.2 years. 30.3% of residents were under the age of 18; 8.2% were between the ages of 18 and 24; 28.4% were from 25 to 44; 20.3% were from 45 to 64; and 12.9% were 65 years of age or older. The gender makeup of the city was 49.3% male and 50.7% female.

=== 2000 census ===
As of the census of 2000, there were 890 people, 360 households, and 249 families living in the city. The population density was 868.8 inhabitants per square mile (335.4/km^{2}). There were 390 housing units at an average density of 380.7 per square mile (147.0/km^{2}). The racial makeup of the city was 98.99% White, 0.79% Native American, and 0.22% from two or more races. Hispanic or Latino of any race were 0.34% of the population.

There were 360 households, out of which 36.9% had children under the age of 18 living with them, 56.9% were married couples living together, 9.7% had a female householder with no husband present, and 30.6% were non-families. 28.3% of all households were made up of individuals, and 17.8% had someone living alone who was 65 years of age or older. The average household size was 2.47 and the average family size was 3.02.

In the city the population was spread out, with 28.4% under the age of 18, 5.8% from 18 to 24, 31.1% from 25 to 44, 16.6% from 45 to 64, and 18.0% who were 65 years of age or older. The median age was 34 years. For every 100 females, there were 92.2 males. For every 100 females age 18 and over, there were 84.6 males.

The median income for a household in the city was $36,944, and the median income for a family was $42,404. Males had a median income of $37,583 versus $23,750 for females. The per capita income for the city was $17,051. About 3.5% of families and 5.7% of the population were below the poverty line, including 2.3% of those under age 18 and 15.0% of those age 65 or over.

== Education ==
Archie (Cass County R-V) School District is the local school district. It operates a PreK-12 system that largely sits on one site, including the elementary and middle school, and Archie High School. The district's athletics "dome" serves as the community storm shelter. The outdoor Athletics Complex sits approximately one-mile west of the main district site.

Archie has a public library, a branch of the Cass County Public Library.

Metropolitan Community College has the Archie school district area in its service area, but not its in-district taxation area.

== Arts and culture ==
Archie is the home of the Missouri State Tractor Pullers Association (MSTPA). Within the past five years, Archie has just recently added a Dollar General just off the highway.

Archie hosts the longest running high school basketball tournament in the state, which is nearing the 90th year.

The War Veterans Memorial is an obelisk monument that pays homage to veteran soldiers, specifically those who had served during wartime and in defense of the country. Developed and erected between 2003-2005 by the local Boy Scout troop, community youth committee. It was designed and project managed by JD Leathers, and paid for by donations from the local community.

== Notable people ==
- Vicky Hartzler, U.S. representative from Missouri
- Oad Swigart, major league baseball player
- Glenn Wright, major league baseball player
