= Oad Swigart =

American baseball player (1915–1997)

- Pitcher
- Born: February 13, 1915; Archie, Missouri, U.S.
- Died: August 8, 1997 (aged 82); St. Joseph, Missouri, U.S.
- Batted: Left Threw: Right

MLB debut
- September 14, 1939, for the Pittsburgh Pirates

Last MLB appearance
- September 27, 1940, for the Pittsburgh Pirates

MLB statistics
- Win–loss record: 1–3
- Earned run average: 4.44
- Strikeouts: 17
- Stats at Baseball Reference

Teams
- Pittsburgh Pirates (1939–1940)

Oadis Vaughn Swigart (February 13, 1915 – August 8, 1997) was an American professional baseball player. He was a right-handed pitcher over parts of two seasons (1939–40) with the Pittsburgh Pirates. For his career, he compiled a 1–3 record, with a 4.44 earned run average, and 17 strikeouts in 46 2/3 innings pitched.

Swigart served 5 years in the army during World War II.

Swigart was born in Archie, Missouri, and died in St. Joseph, Missouri, at the age of 82.
