= Junior city council =

A Junior City Council is a local form of government, governed by minors.

== United States ==
The Strasburg Junior City Council, founded in November 2006, is composed of youth public officials elected into office. Its purpose is to give young adults experience in government and politics. It functions as a normal City Council with meetings, agendas, minutes, and takes on public projects. The Junior Council is a 501(c)(3) non-profit, and is copyrighted.

== Zimbabwe ==
A Junior Council is a replica of the senior council. It carries out tasks same as the senior council but at a junior level. This is done through child participation and capacity building in developmental issues and local governance. In the early 1950 the idea of a Junior City Council was conceived to run parallel with the Senior Council. It was molded into a non-political and non-profit making organization whose aims as laid out in its operating constitution were to; provide a means by which senior scholars may obtain knowledge of civic affairs, report to senior scholars information pertinent to City Council affairs, create an organization representative of all the senior schools within the area of the jurisdiction of the Senior City Council, create a liaison between the young people of the city and the City Council, provide the young people of the city with a means by which they may make known their opinions and feelings, and by the example set by the Junior Council encourage a desire among the younger citizens of the city to participate actively in the affairs of the city. It is a make-up of senior scholars doing their A-level studies. In Zimbabwe there are 92 local authorities with Junior Councils (JCs), which include city councils, town councils, local boards and rural district councils (RDC).

The Junior City Council is headed by an executive committee which comprises the Junior Mayor, Junior Deputy Mayor, Junior Town Clerk, Junior Treasurer, Junior Public Relations officer, Junior Projects coordinator, Junior Chief of Committees Clerk. The number of the Junior councilors equals the number of the Senior Councilors or alternatively the number of wards that need individual council representation. A ward being the subdivided units of the city that a Councilor is given mandate to represent. The Junior Council activities are closely monitored and regulated by a body of former excelled Junior Councilors who are awarded the title City Junior Alderman. The Junior Council term runs for a year and that of Junior Alderman is for life.

In the case of RDCs, there is a change of title to the leadership of the Junior Council. Where there is a mayor in urban councils, in RDCs there are a Junior Council Chairperson and deputy chairperson. Where there are town clerks in urban councils, there is a Chief Executive Officer (CEO) in RDCs. Other positions are the same and there is a need to give the right title to the right person.

A Junior Council is a child-led apolitical organisation whose main thrust is to advocate for the realisation, advancement and protection of child rights. In addition, the Junior Municipal Council also addresses issues such as school dropouts, child abuse, HIV/AIDs, child friendly budgeting, child participation and other pertinent issues affecting children of their areas of jurisdiction and Zimbabwe at large to the relevant authorities and different stakeholders.

The Junior Councils in Zimbabwe are headed and advised by the National Junior Councils Association of Zimbabwe (NJCA). This works as the advisory and mother board of all the 92 local authorities with Junior Councils in the Republic of Zimbabwe. It was formed by a group of outgoing Junior Councillors who later became Junior Aldermen from different councils, including Mvurwi TC, Marondera Municipality, Bulawayo City Council, Chegutu Town Council, Chitungwiza Municipality, Chinhoyi Municipality and Harare City Council among others. The NJCA runs with the mantra "Children's issues our priority." The main business of Junior Councils is to safeguard the rights of all children across the continent and the world.

== South Africa ==
South Africa also has Junior City Councils in each city. These are non-profit organizations that serves the youth and community of their area. They organize a number of events to provide opportunities for the youth to interact, to take initiative and responsibility and simultaneously raise funds for charity. The council members represent the willing schools in that allocated area/city. The learners plan and do all the fundraising events by themselves. The Junior City Councils are led by a student-elected executive or management committee and are overseen by a governing body of adult members.
