= Kingsville, Missouri =

- City
- Location of Kingsville, Missouri
- Coordinates: 38°44′38″N 94°04′12″W
- Country: United States
- State: Missouri
- County: Johnson

Area
  - Total: 0.31 sq mi (0.80 km^{2})
  - Land: 0.31 sq mi (0.80 km^{2})
  - Water: 0 sq mi (0.00 km^{2})
- Elevation: 912 ft (278 m)

Population (2020)
  - Total: 245
  - Density: 792/sq mi (305.9/km^{2})
- Time zone: UTC-6 (Central (CST))
  - Summer (DST): UTC-5 (CDT)
- ZIP code: 64061
- Area code: 816
- FIPS code: 29-38918
- GNIS feature ID: 2395540

Kingsville is a city in west central Johnson County, Missouri, United States. The population was 245 at the 2020 census.

== History ==
Kingsville was platted in 1856. The community was named for General William King, a first settler. A post office called Kingsville has been in operation since 1857.

== Geography ==
Kingsville is located at the intersection of Route 58 and Missouri supplemental routes W and T 2.5 miles east of the Johnson-Cass county line. Holden is approximately five miles to the east and Strasburg is about five miles to the west in adjacent Cass County.

According to the United States Census Bureau, the city has a total area of 0.30 square miles (0.78 km^{2}), all land.

== Demographics ==
Historical population
Census	Pop.	Note	%±
1870	298		—
1880	174		−41.6%
1890	317		82.2%
1900	323		1.9%
1910	238		−26.3%
1920	214		−10.1%
1930	237		10.7%
1940	212		−10.5%
1950	207		−2.4%
1960	225		8.7%
1970	284		26.2%
1980	365		28.5%
1990	279		−23.6%
2000	257		−7.9%
2010	269		4.7%
2020	245		−8.9%
U.S. Decennial Census

=== 2010 census ===
As of the census of 2010, 269 people, 99 households, and 75 families lived in the city. The population density was 896.7 inhabitants per square mile (346.2/km^{2}). There were 114 housing units at an average density of 380.0 per square mile (146.7/km^{2}). The racial makeup of the city was 95.9% White, 0.7% African American, 0.7% Native American, 0.7% from other races, and 1.9% from two or more races. Hispanic or Latino of any race were 2.6% of the population.

There were 99 households, of which 38.4% had children under the age of 18 living with them, 58.6% were married couples living together, 10.1% had a female householder with no husband present, 7.1% had a male householder with no wife present, and 24.2% were non-families. 21.2% of all households comprised individuals, and 8% had someone living alone who was 65 years of age or older. The average household size was 2.72 and the average family size was 3.07.

The median age in the city was 34.8 years. 25.7% of residents were under the age of 18; 9.3% were between the ages of 18 and 24; 27.4% were from 25 to 44; 21.9% were from 45 to 64; and 15.6% were 65 years of age or older. The gender makeup of the city was 49.4% male and 50.6% female.

=== 2000 census ===
As of the census of 2000, there were 257 people, 106 households, and 75 families living in the city. The population density was 858.8 inhabitants per square mile (331.6/km^{2}). There were 117 housing units at an average density of 391.0 per square mile (151.0/km^{2}). The racial makeup of the city was 95.72% White, 2.33% Native American, 0.39% Asian, and 1.56% from two or more races.

There were 106 households, out of which 29.2% had children under the age of 18 living with them, 57.5% were married couples living together, 6.6% had a female householder with no husband present, and 29.2% were non-families. 27.4% of all households were made up of individuals, and 13.2% had someone living alone who was 65 years of age or older. The average household size was 2.42 and the average family size was 2.89.

In the city the population was spread out, with 22.6% under the age of 18, 11.3% from 18 to 24, 26.1% from 25 to 44, 26.1% from 45 to 64, and 14.0% who were 65 years of age or older. The median age was 38 years. For every 100 females there were 97.7 males. For every 100 females age 18 and over, there were 105.2 males.

The median income for a household in the city was $37,031, and the median income for a family was $38,750. Males had a median income of $28,958 versus $28,194 for females. The per capita income for the city was $15,879. About 6.3% of families and 8.2% of the population were below the poverty line, including 11.4% of those under the age of eighteen and none of those 65 or over.

== Points of interest ==
- Powell Gardens

== Education ==
The Kingsville R-I School District administers a K-12 education.
