= Gunn City, Missouri =

- Village
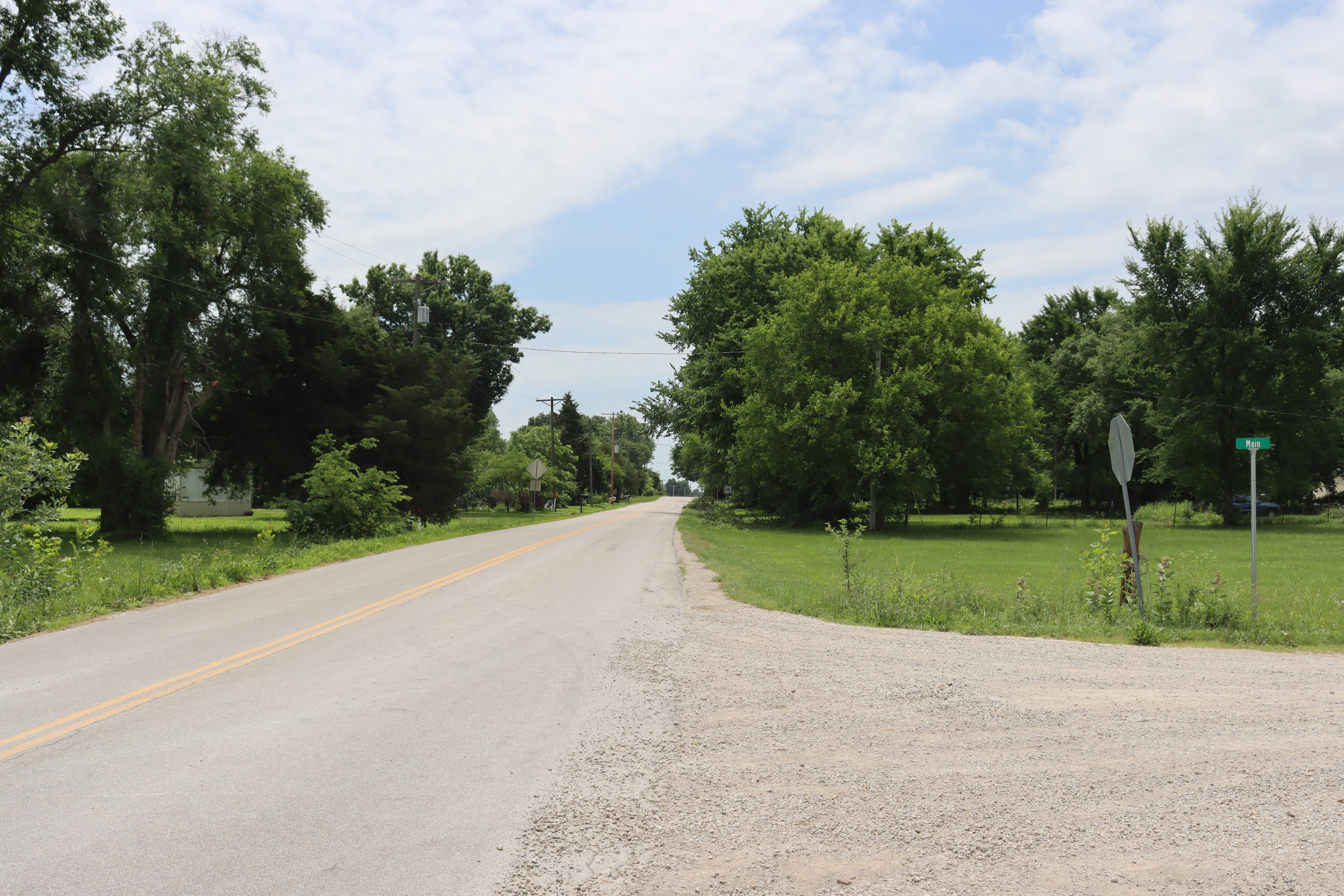
- Main St and State Route M

- Location of Gunn City, Missouri
- Coordinates: 38°39′58″N 94°09′50″W
- Country: United States
- State: Missouri
- County: Cass

Area
  - Total: 0.081 sq mi (0.21 km^{2})
  - Land: 0.081 sq mi (0.21 km^{2})
  - Water: 0 sq mi (0.00 km^{2})
- Elevation: 863 ft (263 m)

Population (2020)
  - Total: 80
  - Density: 991.8/sq mi (382.93/km^{2})
- Time zone: UTC-6 (Central (CST))
  - Summer (DST): UTC-5 (CDT)
- ZIP code: 64747
- Area code: 816
- FIPS code: 29-29764
- GNIS feature ID: 2398217

Gunn City is a village in Cass County, Missouri, United States. The population was 80 at the 2020 census. It is part of the Kansas City metropolitan area.

== History ==
Gunn City was platted in 1871. It was named for O. B. Gunn, an engineer of the Missouri–Kansas–Texas Railroad.

A famous vigilante action took place in Gunn City on April 23, 1872, that came to be called the "Gunn City Massacre." Outraged by a swindle by certain officials of a company building a rail line to Santa Fe, local citizens reacted by trapping the perpetrators on a train and shooting them dead.

== Geography ==
According to the United States Census Bureau, the village has a total area of 0.08 square miles (0.21 km^{2}), all of it land.

== Demographics ==
Historical population
Census	Pop.	Note	%±
1880	135		—
1890	198		46.7%
1920	89		—
1930	71		−20.2%
1940	59		−16.9%
1950	57		−3.4%
1960	63		10.5%
1970	71		12.7%
1980	58		−18.3%
1990	65		12.1%
2000	85		30.8%
2010	118		38.8%
2020	80		−32.2%
U.S. Decennial Census

=== Racial and ethnic composition ===
Gunn City village, Missouri – Racial and ethnic composition Note: the US Census treats Hispanic/Latino as an ethnic category. This table excludes Latinos from the racial categories and assigns them to a separate category. Hispanics/Latinos may be of any race.
Race / Ethnicity (NH = Non-Hispanic)	Pop 2000	Pop 2010	Pop 2020	% 2000	% 2010	% 2020
White alone (NH)	85	105	71	100.00%	88.98%	88.75%
Black or African American alone (NH)	0	1	1	0.00%	0.85%	1.25%
Native American or Alaska Native alone (NH)	0	0	2	0.00%	0.00%	2.50%
Asian alone (NH)	0	0	0	0.00%	0.00%	0.00%
Native Hawaiian or Pacific Islander alone (NH)	0	1	0	0.00%	0.85%	0.00%
Other race alone (NH)	0	0	0	0.00%	0.00%	0.00%
Mixed race or Multiracial (NH)	0	10	5	0.00%	8.47%	6.25%
Hispanic or Latino (any race)	0	1	1	0.00%	0.85%	1.25%
Total	85	118	80	100.00%	100.00%	100.00%

=== 2010 census ===
As of the census of 2010, there were 118 people, 34 households, and 27 families living in the village. The population density was 1,475.0 inhabitants per square mile (569.5/km^{2}). There were 36 housing units at an average density of 450.0 per square mile (173.7/km^{2}). The racial makeup of the village was 89.8% White, 0.8% African American, 0.8% Pacific Islander, and 8.5% from two or more races. Hispanic or Latino of any race were 0.8% of the population.

There were 34 households, of which 50.0% had children under the age of 18 living with them, 52.9% were married couples living together, 17.6% had a female householder with no husband present, 8.8% had a male householder with no wife present, and 20.6% were non-families. 5.9% of all households were made up of individuals. The average household size was 3.47 and the average family size was 3.56.

The median age in the village was 33 years. 33.1% of residents were under the age of 18; 7.5% were between the ages of 18 and 24; 30.5% were from 25 to 44; 20.3% were from 45 to 64; and 8.5% were 65 years of age or older. The gender makeup of the village was 47.5% male and 52.5% female.

=== 2000 census ===
As of the census of 2000, there were 85 people, 32 households, and 24 families living in the village. The population density was 1,054.6 inhabitants per square mile (407.2/km^{2}). There were 33 housing units at an average density of 409.4 per square mile (158.1/km^{2}). The racial makeup of the village was 100.00% White.

There were 32 households, out of which 43.8% had children under the age of 18 living with them, 65.6% were married couples living together, 12.5% had a female householder with no husband present, and 21.9% were non-families. 15.6% of all households were made up of individuals, and 6.3% had someone living alone who was 65 years of age or older. The average household size was 2.66 and the average family size was 3.00.

In the town the population was spread out, with 32.9% under the age of 18, 2.4% from 18 to 24, 35.3% from 25 to 44, 17.6% from 45 to 64, and 11.8% who were 65 years of age or older. The median age was 30 years. For every 100 females, there were 117.9 males. For every 100 females age 18 and over, there were 103.6 males.

The median income for a household in the town was $28,333, and the median income for a family was $27,500. Males had a median income of $31,250 versus $11,875 for females. The per capita income for the town was $11,144. There were 18.8% of families and 22.2% of the population living below the poverty line, including 30.0% of under eighteens and none of those over 64.

== Education ==
It is in the East Lynne 40 School District, an elementary school district.

Metropolitan Community College has the East Lynne school district area in its service area, but not its in-district taxation area.
