= Pleasant Hill, Missouri =

- City
- Location of Pleasant Hill, Missouri
- Coordinates: 38°48′21″N 94°15′55″W
- Country: United States
- State: Missouri
- County: Cass and Jackson

Area
  - Total: 8.24 sq mi (21.34 km^{2})
  - Land: 8.07 sq mi (20.90 km^{2})
  - Water: 0.17 sq mi (0.44 km^{2})
- Elevation: 968 ft (295 m)

Population (2020)
  - Total: 8,777
  - Density: 1,087.8/sq mi (419.99/km^{2})
- Time zone: UTC-6 (Central (CST))
  - Summer (DST): UTC-5 (CDT)
- ZIP code: 64080
- Area codes: 816, 975
- FIPS code: 29-58394
- GNIS feature ID: 2396231
- Website: www.pleasanthill.com

Pleasant Hill is a city in Cass and Jackson counties, Missouri, United States. The population was 8,777 at the 2020 census. It is part of the Kansas City metropolitan area.

Pleasant Hill is home for the National Weather Service Kansas City/Pleasant Hill, Missouri office, which serves 37 counties in northern and western Missouri and seven counties in extreme east-central Kansas.

== History ==
Pleasant Hill was platted in 1844 by William Wright and was recorded as the "Original Town of Pleasant Hill." Wright and Methodist circuit rider William Ferrell operated a mercantile store. The original location was on a ridge near Pleasant Hill Cemetery. The community was named after its "pleasant situation on an elevated prairie". Wright also operated a 3-story tavern that was marked by a 12-foot high beacon atop a pole. It was an overnight stop for stagecoaches between Lexington, Missouri and Fort Scott, Kansas.

During the American Civil War and the run-up to it in the 1860s, Pleasant Hill was bitterly divided between the factions and was subject to numerous bushwhacking incidents. The most notable incidents involved the congregations of the Christian and Presbyterian churches which were built side by side on High Street. The Presbyterian Church was burnt in the process. In 1863 all residents in the area were forced to move from the community in General Order No. 11 (1863).

In 1865 after residents were able to return the city center moved one mile southwest down the hill to the railhead of the Pacific Railroad (the original town site is still within the city limits, however the area is now called "Old Town"). The new city center was lower than the original and adjoins Big Creek.

The Pleasant Hill Downtown Historic District was listed on the National Register of Historic Places in 1994.

The Pleasant Hill Historical Society Museum, outside that district, but in a building that incorporates elements of other historic buildings, is a museum covering the town's history.

In 2016 the former Pacific Railroad line (which was later owned by the Rock Island Railroad) was converted to the western terminus of the 47-mile-long Rock Island Trail State Park (Missouri) and connects the Rails to Trails to the 240-mile-long Katy Trail State Park.

== Geography ==
Pleasant Hill is located in northeastern Cass County at the intersection of Missouri routes 7 and 58 approximately ten miles north-northeast of Harrisonville. Lee's Summit is ten miles to the northwest in adjacent Jackson County. Big Creek flows past the west margin of the city.

According to the United States Census Bureau, the city has a total area of 8.18 square miles (21.19 km^{2}), of which 8.01 square miles (20.75 km^{2}) is land and 0.17 square miles (0.44 km^{2}) is water.

== Demographics ==
Historical population
Census	Pop.	Note	%±
1870	2,554		—
1880	2,372		−7.1%
1890	2,217		−6.5%
1900	2,002		−9.7%
1910	2,065		3.1%
1920	1,965		−4.8%
1930	2,330		18.6%
1940	2,118		−9.1%
1950	2,200		3.9%
1960	2,689		22.2%
1970	3,396		26.3%
1980	3,301		−2.8%
1990	3,827		15.9%
2000	5,582		45.9%
2010	8,113		45.3%
2020	8,777		8.2%
U.S. Decennial Census

=== Racial and ethnic composition ===
Pleasant Hill city, Missouri – Racial and ethnic composition Note: the US Census treats Hispanic/Latino as an ethnic category. This table excludes Latinos from the racial categories and assigns them to a separate category. Hispanics/Latinos may be of any race.
Race / Ethnicity (NH = Non-Hispanic)	Pop 2000	Pop 2010	Pop 2020	% 2000	% 2010	% 2020
White alone (NH)	5,399	7,566	7,786	96.72%	93.26%	88.71%
Black or African American alone (NH)	12	52	58	0.21%	0.64%	0.66%
Native American or Alaska Native alone (NH)	15	37	46	0.27%	0.46%	0.52%
Asian alone (NH)	20	43	31	0.36%	0.53%	0.35%
Native Hawaiian or Pacific Islander alone (NH)	0	4	3	0.00%	0.05%	0.03%
Other race alone (NH)	1	1	28	0.02%	0.01%	0.32%
Mixed race or Multiracial (NH)	47	112	465	0.84%	1.38%	5.30%
Hispanic or Latino (any race)	88	298	360	1.58%	3.67%	4.10%
Total	5,582	8,113	8,777	100.00%	100.00%	100.00%

=== 2020 census ===
As of the 2020 census, Pleasant Hill had a population of 8,777 and 2,216 families. The median age was 36.7 years. 27.8% of residents were under the age of 18 and 14.6% of residents were 65 years of age or older. For every 100 females there were 94.2 males, and for every 100 females age 18 and over there were 91.8 males age 18 and over.

98.5% of residents lived in urban areas, while 1.5% lived in rural areas.

There were 3,249 households in Pleasant Hill, of which 38.5% had children under the age of 18 living in them. Of all households, 54.2% were married-couple households, 14.2% were households with a male householder and no spouse or partner present, and 24.4% were households with a female householder and no spouse or partner present. About 22.8% of all households were made up of individuals and 10.6% had someone living alone who was 65 years of age or older.

There were 3,430 housing units, of which 5.3% were vacant. The homeowner vacancy rate was 1.7% and the rental vacancy rate was 5.8%.

Racial composition as of the 2020 census
Race	Number	Percent
White	7,906	90.1%
Black or African American	58	0.7%
American Indian and Alaska Native	52	0.6%
Asian	33	0.4%
Native Hawaiian and Other Pacific Islander	7	0.1%
Some other race	97	1.1%
Two or more races	624	7.1%

=== Income and poverty ===
The 2016–2020 5-year American Community Survey estimates show that the median household income was $72,630 (with a margin of error of +/- $15,892) and the median family income was $84,000 (+/- $8,503). Males had a median income of $51,656 (+/- $6,157) versus $28,349 (+/- $6,596) for females. The median income for those above 16 years old was $36,771 (+/- $3,546). Approximately, 8.1% of families and 14.3% of the population were below the poverty line, including 21.8% of those under the age of 18 and 4.3% of those ages 65 or over.

=== 2010 census ===
As of the census of 2010, there were 8,113 people, 2,959 households, and 2,196 families living in the city. The population density was 1,012.9 inhabitants per square mile (391.1/km^{2}). There were 3,169 housing units at an average density of 395.6 per square mile (152.7/km^{2}). The racial makeup of the city was 95.3% White, 0.7% African American, 0.5% Native American, 0.5% Asian, 0.1% Pacific Islander, 1.2% from other races, and 1.7% from two or more races. Hispanic or Latino of any race were 3.7% of the population.

There were 2,959 households, of which 42.7% had children under the age of 18 living with them, 56.3% were married couples living together, 13.2% had a female householder with no husband present, 4.7% had a male householder with no wife present, and 25.8% were non-families. 21.5% of all households were made up of individuals, and 8.8% had someone living alone who was 65 years of age or older. The average household size was 2.71 and the average family size was 3.13.

The median age in the city was 33.7 years. 29.5% of residents were under the age of 18; 8.2% were between the ages of 18 and 24; 28.8% were from 25 to 44; 21.9% were from 45 to 64; and 11.7% were 65 years of age or older. The gender makeup of the city was 48.4% male and 51.6% female.

=== 2000 census ===
At the 2000 census, there were 5,582 people, 2,070 households and 1,509 families living in the city. The population density was 1,242.3 inhabitants per square mile (479.7/km^{2}). There were 2,202 housing units at an average density of 490.1 per square mile (189.2/km^{2}). The racial makeup of the city was 97.55% White, 0.21% African American, 0.34% Native American, 0.38% Asian, 0.45% from other races, and 1.07% from two or more races. Hispanic or Latino of any race were 1.58% of the population.

There were 2,070 households, of which 40.7% had children under the age of 18 living with them, 58.6% were married couples living together, 10.3% had a female householder with no husband present, and 27.1% were non-families. 22.7% of all households were made up of individuals, and 9.4% had someone living alone who was 65 years of age or older. The average household size was 2.66 and the average family size was 3.12.

Age distribution was 30.2% under the age of 18, 8.0% from 18 to 24, 31.9% from 25 to 44, 18.6% from 45 to 64, and 11.3% who were 65 years of age or older. The median age was 33 years. For every 100 females, there were 94.4 males. For every 100 females age 18 and over, there were 89.0 males.

The median household income was $48,915, and the median family income was $52,799. Males had a median income of $40,394 versus $24,985 for females. The per capita income for the city was $21,623. About 4.0% of families and 5.5% of the population were below the poverty line, including 5.1% of those under age 18 and 5.2% of those age 65 or over.

== Education ==
The vast majority of Pleasant Hill in Cass County is in the Pleasant Hill R-3 School District. A small piece of Pleasant Hill in that county is in the Strasburg C-3 School District, an elementary school district. The small portion of Pleasant Hill in Jackson County is in the Lee's Summit R-VII School District.

The Pleasant Hill school district includes the following:

Primary School K-2

- Pleasant Hill

Elementary School (3-4)

- Pleasant Hill

Intermediate School (5-6);

- Pleasant Hill

Middle School (7-8)

- Pleasant Hill Middle School

High School

- Pleasant Hill High School

Pleasant Hill has a public library, a branch of the Cass County Public Library.

Metropolitan Community College has the Pleasant Hill and Strasburg school district areas in its service area, but not its in-district taxation area. The community college district has the Lee's Summit school district in its in-district taxation area.
