= Cass County, Missouri =

County in Missouri, United States

- County
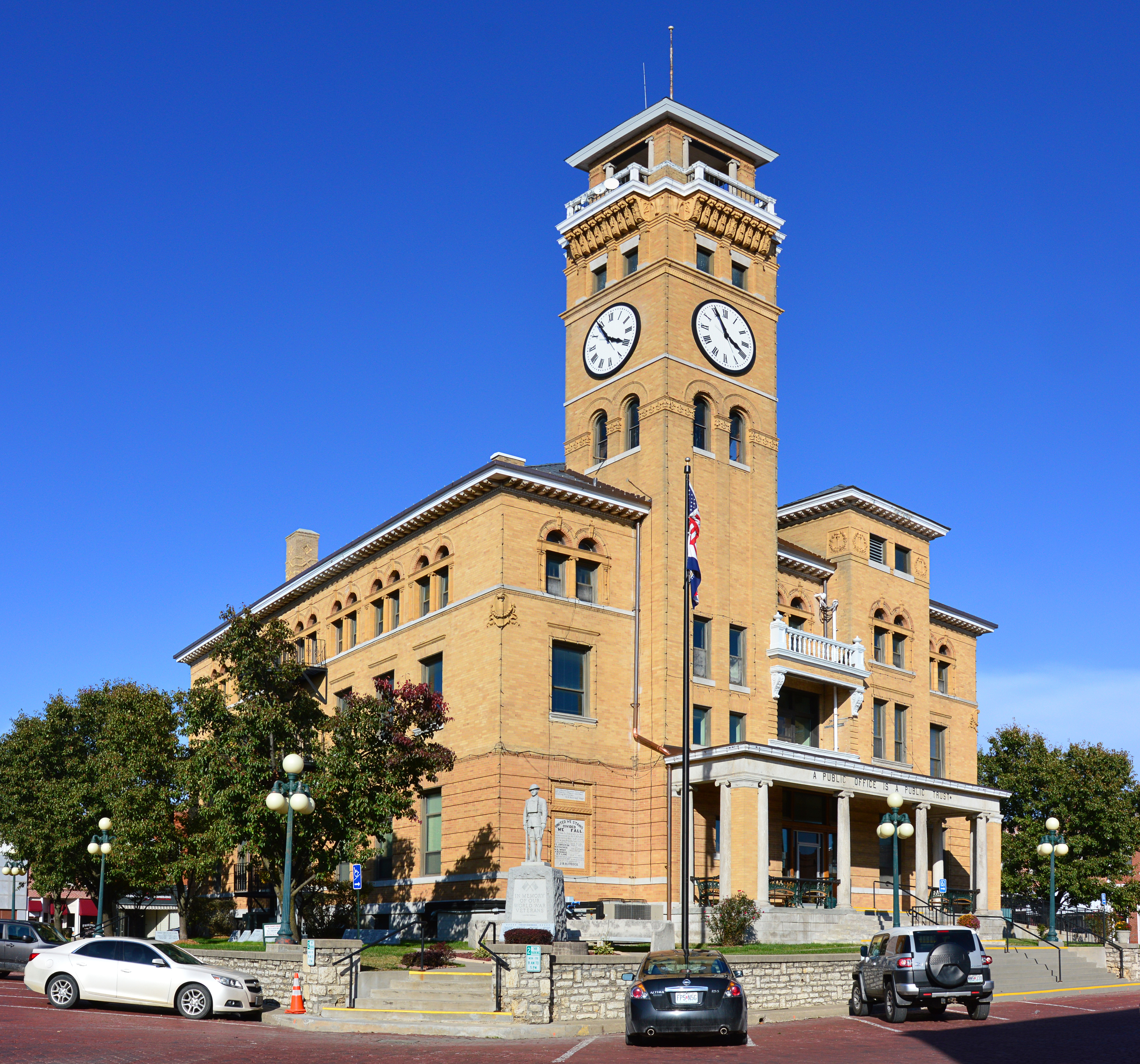
- County courthouse in Harrisonville

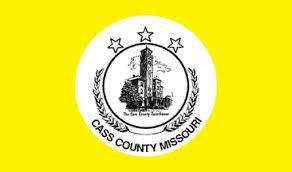
- Flag

- Location within the U.S. state of Missouri
- Coordinates: 38.65°N 94.35°W
- Country: United States
- State: Missouri
- Founded: March 3, 1835
- Named for: Lewis Cass
- Seat: Harrisonville
- Largest city: Kansas City

Government
  - County Commission: Presiding Commissioner Bob Huston Associate Commissioner Monty Kisner Associate Commissioner Jimmy Odom

Area
  - Total: 702 sq mi (1,820 km^{2})
  - Land: 697 sq mi (1,810 km^{2})
  - Water: 5.7 sq mi (15 km^{2}) 0.8%

Population (2020)
  - Total: 107,824
  - Estimate (2025): 115,859 ▲
  - Density: 155/sq mi (59.7/km^{2})
- Time zone: UTC−6 (Central)
  - Summer (DST): UTC−5 (CDT)
- Congressional district: 4th
- Website: www.casscounty.com

Cass County is located in the western part of the U.S. state of Missouri and is part of the Kansas City metropolitan area. As of the 2020 census, the population was 107,824. Its county seat is Harrisonville; however, the county contains a portion of Kansas City, Missouri. The county was organized in 1835 as Van Buren County, but was renamed in 1849 after U.S. Senator Lewis Cass of Michigan, who later became a presidential candidate.

== History ==
The Harrisonville area was long inhabited by speakers of the Dhegihan Siouan-language family: The Osage, Quapaw, Omaha, Ponca and Kansa tribes make up this sub-group. The Kansa's tribal range extended southward from the Kansas-Missouri River junction as far as the northern edge of present-day Bates County, Missouri, taking in the sites of modern Pleasant Hill, Garden City, Archie and Drexel. On their southeastern border they were neighbors of the Osage. There is no evidence that either of these tribes ever had a truly permanent settlement in the territory of Cass County.

Other historical tribes in the area were reportedly Shawnee and Lenape (aka Delaware), whose tribes spoke related Algonquian languages. The Lenape had been pushed to the Midwest from their territory along the mid-Atlantic coast by continuous white encroachment.

In 1818, the United States had granted land to the Lenape in southern Missouri Territory, but they were forced to cede it back in 1825, after Missouri became a state. At that time, they were removed to a reservation in Kansas. Other Lenape had previously migrated south to Texas, seeking refuge in what was still Mexican territory after it gained independence from Spain. Those who remained in the Harrisonville area were close relatives of the Sauk, Meskwaki and Kickapoo tribes.

The early camp meetings held by European-American settlers southwest of Harrisonville often attracted as many as 500 Indians, in addition to Europeans. They seemed to enjoy the enthusiastic religious services, accompanied by hymn singing and socializing, as much as the white settlers did.

The first European-American settler on the site of modern Harrisonville was James Lackey in 1830. Other early settlers were Humphrey Hunt, John Blythe, and Dr. Joseph Hudspeth. Lackey was considered a "squatter," as he built a cabin and enclosed a small field on the tract of public land taken to establish the county seat.

The site of the town was fixed under an act of the Missouri General Assembly in 1835, by David Waldo of Lafayette County and Samuel Hink and William Brown, both of Jackson County. In the same year, the first court met for the county, known as Van Buren County. Justices James McClellan and William Savage met in McClellan's residence about three miles (4.8 km) southeast of Peculiar on September 14, 1835. William Lyon was appointed clerk of the court and county government was organized, including the establishment of Grand River Township.

In the spring of 1837, the town of Harrisonville was platted by Enoch Rice, Francis Prine and Welcome Scott, who had been appointed commissioners by the state legislature in the winter of 1836. These commissioners, in company with Martin Rice, the county surveyor, met at the home of John Cook on April 3, 1837, to resolve Lackey's preemption claim. In May they laid off the town in lots 3, 4, 5 and 6 of the northeast and northwest quarters of Section 4, Township 44N., Range 31W. Within these 160 acres (0.65 km^{2}) there were to be four streets: Wall and Pearl running east to west, and Lexington and Independence going north and south, each less than 40 feet wide. Fleming Harris was appointed town commissioner on April 8, 1837. The first town lots were sold on June 12 of that year; those facing the public square sold at $20 each, the others at $10.

"Democrat" was strongly urged as a name for the new town but was finally rejected. The town was named after U.S. Representative Albert G. Harrison from Missouri. The first house within the town was erected by Jason L. Dickey in 1836. The first jail in Harrisonville and second for Cass County was established in 1838. Its site was 312 S. Independence. One of its successors is recognized among the state's historic sites.

On October 8, 1835, the first church in Harrisonville was organized. Its site was two miles southwest of town and it was known as Hopewell or New Hope Baptist.

Harrisonville eventually was served by railroad lines known as the Missouri Pacific and the Frisco. After a scandal in funding railroad construction by the issuance of bonds, three men involved in the swindle were shot and killed by a mob on April 24, 1872, when their train was stopped on a Katy railroad spur. This became known as the "Gunn City Massacre" because it took place near that city.

In 1857 Cass County had approved a large stock subscription for the Pacific Railroad Company, to support its construction in the area. This corporation later surrendered the bonds to the new Saint Louis and Santa Fe Railroad, from whence they were later assigned to the Land Grant Railroad & Construction Company of New York City. Residents of Cass County gained a court injunction in an effort to prevent the funding of these bonds, but by legal maneuvering and collusion, the company gained a new set of bonds, issued secretly.

The populace was outraged, believing this maneuver was intended to benefit the holders of the now worthless bonds, by re-obligating the county to pay those same bonds. The county attorney, a judge of the county court, and a third man involved in the scandal were shot and killed while on a train stopped between Bryson, Missouri and Paola, Kansas. (It was in or near what is now known as Gunn City). Afterward some 41 men were arrested as suspects and prosecuted for these killings, but none was convicted. At the time of the shootings, a related mob burned a Republican newspaper owned by Porter J. Coston, in Harrisonville, Missouri.

By 1860, the year before the Civil War, 12 cities in Missouri had populations of approximately 2,500 or more. Harrisonville ranked 37th, with a population of 675. In 1863 the town was depopulated, as the United States forces pushed the people out in an effort to reduce any local support for insurgent guerrilla activity in the area. Most of the buildings were burned, the jail among them. Fort Harrisonville was a Union stronghold for a brief period in 1863 and provided protection for loyal Union families.

Some of the county's local history is presented at the Pleasant Hill Historical Society Museum, in Pleasant Hill on the northern edge of the county.

== Geography ==
According to the U.S. Census Bureau, the county has a total area of 702 square miles (1,820 km^{2}), of which 697 square miles (1,810 km^{2}) is land and 5.7 square miles (15 km^{2}) (0.8%) is water.

=== Adjacent counties ===
- Jackson County (north)
- Johnson County (east)
- Henry County (southeast)
- Bates County (south)
- Miami County, Kansas (west)
- Johnson County, Kansas (northwest)

Cass County is one of the few counties in the United States to border two counties of the same name in different states (Johnson County in Missouri and Kansas).

=== Major highways ===
- I-49 / US 71
- Route 2
- Route 7
- Route 58
- Route 291

=== Transit ===
- Jefferson Lines

== Demographics ==
Historical population
Census	Pop.	Note	%±
1840	4,693		—
1850	6,090		29.8%
1860	9,794		60.8%
1870	19,296		97.0%
1880	22,431		16.2%
1890	23,301		3.9%
1900	23,636		1.4%
1910	22,973		−2.8%
1920	21,536		−6.3%
1930	20,962		−2.7%
1940	19,534		−6.8%
1950	19,325		−1.1%
1960	29,702		53.7%
1970	39,748		33.8%
1980	51,029		28.4%
1990	63,808		25.0%
2000	82,092		28.7%
2010	99,478		21.2%
2020	107,824		8.4%
2025 (est.)	115,859	▲	7.5%
U.S. Decennial Census; 1790-1960 1900-1990; 1990-2000 2010-2020

=== 2020 census ===
As of the 2020 census, the county had a population of 107,824 and the median age was 40.2 years. 24.3% of residents were under the age of 18 and 17.4% of residents were 65 years of age or older. For every 100 females there were 96.0 males, and for every 100 females age 18 and over there were 93.3 males age 18 and over.

The racial makeup of the county is detailed in the table below, with non-Hispanic White residents accounting for the largest share and Hispanic or Latino residents of any race comprising 5.2% of the population.

Cass County, Missouri – Racial and ethnic composition Note: the US Census treats Hispanic/Latino as an ethnic category. This table excludes Latinos from the racial categories and assigns them to a separate category. Hispanics/Latinos may be of any race.
Race / Ethnicity (NH = Non-Hispanic)	Pop 1980	Pop 1990	Pop 2000	Pop 2010	Pop 2020	% 1980	% 1990	% 2000	% 2010	% 2020
White alone (NH)	49,849	61,689	77,284	89,079	89,406	97.69%	96.68%	94.14%	89.55%	82.92%
Black or African American alone (NH)	403	672	1,147	3,444	4,904	0.79%	1.05%	1.40%	3.46%	4.55%
Native American or Alaska Native alone (NH)	174	355	441	504	502	0.34%	0.56%	0.54%	0.51%	0.47%
Asian alone (NH)	149	251	387	623	841	0.29%	0.39%	0.47%	0.63%	0.78%
Native Hawaiian or Pacific Islander alone (NH)	x	x	26	62	78	x	x	0.03%	0.06%	0.07%
Other race alone (NH)	52	12	31	66	430	0.10%	0.02%	0.04%	0.07%	0.40%
Mixed race or Multiracial (NH)	x	x	960	1,712	6,080	x	x	1.17%	1.72%	5.64%
Hispanic or Latino (any race)	402	829	1,816	3,988	5,583	0.79%	1.30%	2.21%	4.01%	5.18%
Total	51,029	63,808	82,092	99,478	107,824	100.00%	100.00%	100.00%	100.00%	100.00%

70.3% of residents lived in urban areas, while 29.7% lived in rural areas.

There were 40,907 households in the county, of which 33.0% had children under the age of 18 living with them and 23.0% had a female householder with no spouse or partner present. About 22.9% of all households were made up of individuals and 10.9% had someone living alone who was 65 years of age or older.

There were 43,445 housing units, of which 5.8% were vacant. Among occupied housing units, 75.7% were owner-occupied and 24.3% were renter-occupied. The homeowner vacancy rate was 1.4% and the rental vacancy rate was 8.5%.

=== 2000 census ===
As of the 2000 census, there were 82,092 people, 30,168 households, and 22,988 families residing in the county. The population density was 117 inhabitants per square mile (45/km^{2}). There were 31,677 housing units at an average density of 45 units per square mile (17/km^{2}). The racial makeup of the county was 95.62% White, 1.42% Black or African American, 0.58% Native American, 0.48% Asian, 0.04% Pacific Islander, 0.50% from other races, and 1.35% from two or more races. Approximately 2.21% of the population were Hispanic or Latino of any race.

There were 30,168 households, out of which 38.10% had children under the age of 18 living with them, 63.60% were married couples living together, 9.10% had a female householder with no husband present, and 23.80% were non-families. 20.00% of all households were made up of individuals, and 8.50% had someone living alone who was 65 years of age or older. The average household size was 2.69 and the average family size was 3.09.

In the county, the population was spread out, with 28.40% under the age of 18, 7.30% from 18 to 24, 30.20% from 25 to 44, 22.30% from 45 to 64, and 11.70% who were 65 years of age or older. The median age was 36 years. For every 100 females there were 95.90 males. For every 100 females age 18 and over, there were 92.90 males.

The median income for a household in the county was $49,562, and the median income for a family was $55,258. Males had a median income of $39,001 versus $26,174 for females. The per capita income for the county was $21,073. About 4.20% of families and 5.80% of the population were below the poverty line, including 7.00% of those under age 18 and 5.20% of those age 65 or over.

=== Religion ===
According to the Association of Religion Data Archives County Membership Report (2010), Cass County is sometimes regarded as being on the northern edge of the Bible Belt, with evangelical Protestantism being the most predominant religion. The most predominant denominations among residents in Cass County who adhere to a religion are Southern Baptists (43.71%), Roman Catholics (17.42%), and United Methodists (11.07%).

== Education ==
=== Public schools ===
School districts include:

Full K-12 school districts

- Archie R-V School District
- Belton School District
- Drexel R-IV School District
- Harrisonville R-IX School District
- Holden R-III School District
- Kingsville R-I School District
- Lee's Summit R-VII School District
- Lone Jack C-VI School District
- Raymore-Peculiar R-II School District
- Sherwood Cass R-VIII School District
- Pleasant Hill R-III School District
- Midway R-I School District

Elementary school districts:

- East Lynne 40 School District
- Strasburg C-III School District

==== Individual schools ====
- Archie R-V School District – Archie
  - Cass County Elementary School (PK-06)
  - Archie High School (07-12)
- Belton School District
  - Belton High School (10-12)
- Drexel R-IV School District – Drexel
  - Drexel Elementary School (K-06)
  - Drexel High School (07-12)
- East Lynne School District No. 40 – East Lynne
  - East Lynne Elementary School (PK-08)
- Harrisonville R-IX School District – Harrisonville
  - Early Childhood Center (PK-K)
  - Harrisonville Elementary School (01-05)
  - McEowen Elementary School (04-05)
  - Harrisonville Middle School (06-08)
  - Harrisonville High School (09-12)
- Midway R-I School District – Cleveland
  - Midway Elementary School (K-06)
  - Midway High School (07-12)
- Pleasant Hill R-III School District – Pleasant Hill
  - Pleasant Hill Primary School (PK-02)
  - Pleasant Hill Elementary School (03-04)
  - Pleasant Hill Intermediate School (05-06)
  - Pleasant Hill Middle School (07-08)
  - Pleasant Hill High School (09-12)
- Raymore-Peculiar R-II School District
- Sherwood Cass R-VIII School District – Creighton
  - Sherwood Elementary School (K-05)
  - Sherwood Middle School (06-08)
  - Sherwood High School (09-12)
- Strasburg C-3 School District – Strasburg
  - Strasburg Elementary School (K-08)

=== Private schools ===
- Hope Baptist Christian School – Pleasant Hill (01-12) – Baptist
- Harrisonville Christian School – Harrisonville (PK-08) – Nondenominational Christian
- Training Center Christian School – Garden City (PK-12) – Pentecostal
- Heartland High School & Academy – Belton (PK-12) – Baptist
- Blue Ridge Christian School South – Belton (PK-06) – Nondenominational Christian

=== Public libraries ===
- Cass County Public Library

=== Colleges and universities ===
Metropolitan Community College has the Lee's Summit and Belton school districts in its in-district taxation area. The Archie, Drexel, East Lynne, Midway, Pleasant Hill, Raymore-Preculiar, Sherwood Cass, and Strasburg school districts are in the out of district service area but not the in-district taxation area.

== Politics ==
=== Local ===
Local politics are controlled by the Republican Party in Cass County.

Cass County, Missouri

Elected countywide officials
Assessor	Roger Raffety	Republican
Auditor	Jack Bondon	Republican
Circuit Clerk	Kim York	Republican
County Clerk	Jeff Fletcher	Republican
Collector	Chris Molendorp	Republican
Commissioner (presiding)	Bob Huston	Republican
Commissioner (district 1)	Monty Kisner	Republican
Commissioner (district 2)	Ryan Johnson	Republican
Prosecuting Attorney	Ben Butler	Republican
Public Administrator	Randy Jones	Republican
Recorder	Mike Medsker	Republican
Sheriff	Jeff Weber	Republican
Treasurer	Steve Cheslik	Republican

=== State ===
Past Gubernatorial Elections Results
Year	Republican	Democratic	Third Parties
2024	65.06% 38,034	32.69% 19,112	2.25% 1,318
2020	64.80% 37,025	32.85% 18,770	2.36% 1,347
2016	56.05% 28,571	40.64% 20,713	3.31% 1,688
2012	49.19% 23,837	47.81% 23,168	3.00% 1,454
2008	45.77% 22,592	52.18% 25,754	2.05% 1,010
2004	53.53% 23,538	44.97% 19,772	1.49% 659
2000	52.74% 18,777	45.18% 16,084	2.08% 742
1996	38.32% 11,038	59.21% 17,055	2.47% 710

Cass County is split between five legislative districts in the Missouri House of Representatives, four of which are held by Republicans and one by a Democrat.

- District 33 – Chris Sander (R-Lone Jack). Includes the communities of East Lynne, Gunn City, Harrisonville, Pleasant Hill, and Strasburg.

Missouri House of Representatives — District 33 — Cass County (2020)
Party	Candidate	Votes	%	±%
Republican	Chris Sander	9,421	100.00%	+28.55

Missouri House of Representatives — District 33 — Cass County (2018)
Party	Candidate	Votes	%	±%
Republican	Donna Pfautsch	6,140	71.45%	+1.39
Democratic	Pat Williams	2,453	28.55%	−1.39

- District 37 — Annette Turnbaugh (D-Grandview). Includes parts of the cities of Lake Winnebago and Raymore.

Missouri House of Representatives — District 37 — Cass County (2020)
Party	Candidate	Votes	%	±%
Republican	John D. Boyd, Jr.	1,852	58.66%	+4.28
Democratic	Annette Turnbaugh	1,275	40.39%	−5.23
Green	Daniel Karam	30	0.95%	+0.95

Missouri House of Representatives — District 37 — Cass County (2018)
Party	Candidate	Votes	%	±%
Republican	John D. Boyd, Jr.	1,228	54.38%	+54.38
Democratic	Joe Runions	1,030	45.62%	−54.38

- District 55 – Mike Haffner (R-Pleasant Hill). Includes the communities of Garden City, Peculiar, and parts of Lake Winnebago and Raymore.

Missouri House of Representatives — District 55 — Cass County (2020)
Party	Candidate	Votes	%	±%
Republican	Mike Haffner	18,583	100.00%	±0.00

Missouri House of Representatives — District 55 — Cass County (2018)
Party	Candidate	Votes	%	±%
Republican	Mike Haffner	13,557	100.00%	+36.63

- District 56 — Michael Davis (R-Kansas City). Includes the communities of Belton, Cleveland, Drexel, Freeman, Lake Annette, and a tiny sliver of Kansas City.

Missouri House of Representatives — District 56 — Cass County (2020)
Party	Candidate	Votes	%	±%
Republican	Michael Davis	10,783	62.85%	−37.15
Democratic	Neal Barnes	6,374	37.15%	+37.15

Missouri House of Representatives — District 56 — Cass County (2018)
Party	Candidate	Votes	%	±%
Republican	Jack Bondon	10,622	100.00%	+31.40

- District 57 — Rodger Reedy (R-Windsor). Includes the communities of Archie and Creighton.

Missouri House of Representatives — District 57 — Cass County (2020)
Party	Candidate	Votes	%	±%
Republican	Rodger Reedy	1,824	100.00%	+29.97

Missouri House of Representatives — District 57 — Cass County (2018)
Party	Candidate	Votes	%	±%
Republican	Rodger Reedy	1,096	70.03%	+3.72
Democratic	Joan Shores	469	29.97%	−3.72

All of Cass County is a part of Missouri's 31st District in the Missouri Senate and is currently represented by Rick Brattin (R-Harrisonville).

Missouri Senate — District 31 — Cass County (2020)
Party	Candidate	Votes	%	±%
Republican	Rick Brattin	37,675	67.21%	−5.50
Democratic	Raymond Kinney	18,379	32.79%	+32.79

Missouri Senate — District 31 — Cass County (2016)
Party	Candidate	Votes	%	±%
Republican	Ed Emery	34,934	72.71%	+9.68
Libertarian	Lora Young	7,168	14.92%	+14.92
Independent	Tim Wells	5,944	12.37%	+12.37

=== Federal ===
All of Cass County is included in Missouri's 4th Congressional District and is currently represented by Vicky Hartzler (R-Harrisonville) in the U.S. House of Representatives. Hartzler was elected to a sixth term in 2020 over Democratic challenger Lindsey Simmons.

U.S. House of Representatives – Missouri’s 4th Congressional District – Cass County (2020)
Party	Candidate	Votes	%	±%
Republican	Vicky Hartzler	38,185	67.45%	+3.71
Democratic	Lindsey Simmons	17,050	30.12%	−3.61
Libertarian	Steven K. Koonse	1,380	2.44%	−0.09

U.S. House of Representatives – Missouri's 4th Congressional District – Cass County (2018)
Party	Candidate	Votes	%	±%
Republican	Vicky Hartzler	27,737	63.74%	−5.87
Democratic	Renee Hoagenson	14,677	33.73%	+7.48
Libertarian	Mark Bliss	1,100	2.53%	−1.61

Cass County, along with the rest of the state of Missouri, is represented in the U.S. Senate by Josh Hawley (R-Columbia) and Roy Blunt (R-Strafford).

U.S. Senate – Class I – Cass County (2018)
Party	Candidate	Votes	%	±%
Republican	Josh Hawley	25,861	59.02%	+14.45
Democratic	Claire McCaskill	16,340	37.29%	−9.50
Independent	Craig O'Dear	746	1.70%	
Libertarian	Japheth Campbell	595	1.36%	−7.28
Green	Jo Crain	274	0.63%	+0.63

Blunt was elected to a second term in 2016 over then-Missouri Secretary of State Jason Kander.

U.S. Senate — Class III — Cass County (2016)
Party	Candidate	Votes	%	±%
Republican	Roy Blunt	27,532	54.12%	+9.55
Democratic	Jason Kander	20,628	40.55%	−6.24
Libertarian	Jonathan Dine	1,542	3.03%	−5.61
Green	Johnathan McFarland	594	1.17%	+1.17
Constitution	Fred Ryman	578	1.14%	+1.14

==== Political culture ====
United States presidential election results for Cass County, Missouri
Year	Republican		Democratic		Third party(ies)	
Year	No.	%	No.	%	No.	%
1888	2,095	40.03%	3,015	57.60%	124	2.37%
1892	1,908	35.23%	3,027	55.89%	481	8.88%
1896	2,229	35.50%	3,975	63.31%	75	1.19%
1900	2,162	37.85%	3,350	58.65%	200	3.50%
1904	2,375	44.36%	2,750	51.36%	229	4.28%
1908	2,193	39.84%	3,143	57.10%	168	3.05%
1912	1,034	18.38%	3,247	57.70%	1,346	23.92%
1916	2,104	37.95%	3,337	60.19%	103	1.86%
1920	4,055	44.15%	5,030	54.76%	100	1.09%
1924	3,610	42.17%	4,709	55.01%	242	2.83%
1928	5,299	59.11%	3,647	40.68%	18	0.20%
1932	3,009	34.01%	5,772	65.24%	66	0.75%
1936	4,070	41.31%	5,731	58.17%	52	0.53%
1940	4,983	47.55%	5,479	52.29%	17	0.16%
1944	4,687	51.84%	4,347	48.08%	7	0.08%
1948	3,614	39.96%	5,415	59.87%	16	0.18%
1952	6,000	54.04%	5,089	45.84%	13	0.12%
1956	5,589	50.06%	5,575	49.94%	0	0.00%
1960	6,523	53.29%	5,718	46.71%	0	0.00%
1964	3,665	35.50%	6,658	64.50%	0	0.00%
1968	5,271	45.14%	4,468	38.26%	1,938	16.60%
1972	9,242	71.24%	3,731	28.76%	0	0.00%
1976	7,182	43.98%	9,008	55.16%	140	0.86%
1980	10,105	52.81%	8,198	42.85%	831	4.34%
1984	14,456	65.79%	7,517	34.21%	0	0.00%
1988	12,799	55.75%	10,092	43.96%	67	0.29%
1992	10,349	34.61%	10,246	34.26%	9,310	31.13%
1996	13,495	46.52%	11,743	40.48%	3,772	13.00%
2000	20,113	56.07%	14,921	41.60%	835	2.33%
2004	27,253	61.63%	16,681	37.73%	283	0.64%
2008	29,695	58.99%	19,844	39.42%	802	1.59%
2012	30,912	62.95%	17,044	34.71%	1,148	2.34%
2016	33,098	64.38%	14,846	28.88%	3,466	6.74%
2020	37,197	64.79%	19,052	33.19%	1,159	2.02%
2024	38,792	65.36%	19,753	33.28%	804	1.35%

Cass County was, up to World War II, solidly Democratic rooted in its strong secessionist sympathies during the Civil War. However, since 1952 it has become a strongly Republican county in presidential elections. Cass County strongly favored Donald Trump in both 2016 and 2020. The last Democratic candidate to carry the county was Jimmy Carter in 1976.

Voters in Cass County generally adhere to socially and culturally conservative principles which tend to influence their Republican leanings. Despite Cass County's longstanding tradition of supporting socially conservative platforms, voters in the county have a penchant for advancing populist causes. In 2018, Missourians voted on a proposition (Proposition A) concerning right to work, the outcome of which ultimately reversed the right to work legislation passed in the state the previous year. 66.33% of Cass County voters cast their ballots to overturn the law.

=== Missouri presidential preference primaries ===
==== 2020 ====
The 2020 presidential primaries for both the Democratic and Republican parties were held in Missouri on March 10. On the Democratic side, former Vice President Joe Biden (D-Delaware) both won statewide and carried Cass County by a wide margin. Biden went on to defeat President Donald Trump in the general election.

Missouri Democratic Presidential Primary – Cass County (2020)
Party	Candidate	Votes	%	±%
Democratic	Joe Biden	5,839	63.43	
Democratic	Bernie Sanders	2,890	31.39	
Democratic	Tulsi Gabbard	81	0.88	
Democratic	Others/Uncommitted	396	4.30	

Incumbent President Donald Trump (R-Florida) faced a primary challenge from former Massachusetts Governor Bill Weld, but won both Cass County and statewide by overwhelming margins.

Missouri Republican Presidential Primary – Cass County (2020)
Party	Candidate	Votes	%	±%
Republican	Donald Trump	5,220	97.13	
Republican	Bill Weld	34	0.63	
Republican	Others/Uncommitted	120	2.23	

==== 2016 ====
The 2016 presidential primaries for both the Republican and Democratic parties were held in Missouri on March 15. Businessman Donald Trump (R-New York) narrowly won the state overall, but Senator Ted Cruz (R-Texas) carried a plurality of the vote in Cass County. Trump went on to win the nomination and the presidency.

Missouri Republican Presidential Primary – Cass County (2016)
Party	Candidate	Votes	%	±%
Republican	Ted Cruz	7,672	43.39	
Republican	Donald Trump	6,891	38.98	
Republican	John Kasich	1,650	9.33	
Republican	Marco Rubio	1,064	6.02	
Republican	Others/Uncommitted	403	2.28	

On the Democratic side, former Secretary of State Hillary Clinton (D-New York) narrowly won statewide, but Senator Bernie Sanders (I-Vermont) won a majority in Cass County.

Missouri Democratic Presidential Primary – Cass County (2016)
Party	Candidate	Votes	%	±%
Democratic	Bernie Sanders	4,187	52.07	
Democratic	Hillary Clinton	3,765	46.82	
Democratic	Others/Uncommitted	89	1.11	

==== 2012 ====
The 2012 Missouri Republican Presidential Primary's results were nonbinding on the state's national convention delegates. Voters in Cass County supported former U.S. Senator Rick Santorum (R-Pennsylvania), who finished first in the state at large, but eventually lost the nomination to former Governor Mitt Romney (R-Massachusetts). Delegates to the congressional district and state conventions were chosen at a county caucus, which selected a delegation favoring Santorum. Incumbent President Barack Obama easily won the Missouri Democratic Primary and renomination. He defeated Romney in the general election.

==== 2008 ====
In 2008, the Missouri Republican Presidential Primary was closely contested, with Senator John McCain (R-Arizona) prevailing and eventually winning the nomination. However, former Governor Mitt Romney (R-Massachusetts) won a plurality in Cass County.

Missouri Republican Presidential Primary – Cass County (2008)
Party	Candidate	Votes	%	±%
Republican	Mitt Romney	3,324	32.55	
Republican	John McCain	3,195	31.28	
Republican	Mike Huckabee	3,033	29.70	
Republican	Ron Paul	477	4.67	
Republican	Others/Uncommitted	184	1.80	

Then-Senator Hillary Clinton (D-New York) received more votes than any candidate from either party in Cass County during the 2008 presidential primary. Despite initial reports that Clinton had won Missouri, Barack Obama (D-Illinois), also a Senator at the time, narrowly defeated her statewide and later became that year's Democratic nominee, going on to win the presidency.

Missouri Democratic Presidential Primary – Cass County (2008)
Party	Candidate	Votes	%	±%
Democratic	Hillary Clinton	6,500	59.76	
Democratic	Barack Obama	3,995	36.73	
Democratic	Others/Uncommitted	382	3.51	

== Communities ==
=== Cities ===
- Archie
- Belton
- Cleveland
- Creighton
- Drexel
- East Lynne
- Freeman
- Garden City
- Harrisonville (county seat)
- Kansas City (partly)
- Lake Annette
- Lake Winnebago
- Lee's Summit (partly)
- Peculiar
- Pleasant Hill
- Raymore
- Strasburg

=== Villages ===
- Baldwin Park
- Gunn City
- Riverview Estates
- West Line

=== Census-designated places ===
- Loch Lloyd

=== Unincorporated communities ===
- Austin
- Coleman
- Daugherty
- Dayton
- Everett
- Jaudon
- Lisle
- Lone Tree
- Main City
- Wingate

== Notable people ==
- Robert C. Bell, federal judge
- Angelica Bridges, actress, model, and singer
- Delmer Brown, Japanologist
- Emmett Dalton, of the bank-robbing Dalton Gang
- Carson Coffman, AFL quarterback
- Chase Coffman, NFL tight end
- Paul Coffman, NFL tight end
- Tyler Farr, country music singer-songwriter
- Brutus Hamilton, decathlete and track and field coach
- Ben Hardaway, storyboard artist, animator, voice actor, gagman, writer, and director during the Golden Age of American animation
- Vicky Hartzler, U.S. Representative from Missouri (2011–2023)
- Kevin Hern, U.S. Representative from Oklahoma (2018–present)
- Ewing Kauffman, businessman who founded Marion Laboratories and was the first owner of the Kansas City Royals
- Chris Koster, 41st Attorney General of Missouri (2009-2017)
- Tammy Faye Messner, televangelist
- Carrie Nation, leader of temperance movement
- Edward Capehart O'Kelley, man who killed Robert Ford, who killed Jesse James
- Tate Stevens, 2012 winner of The X Factor
- Oad Swigart, professional baseball player
- Glenn Wright, professional baseball player

== See also ==
- List of counties in Missouri
- National Register of Historic Places listings in Cass County, Missouri
