= National Register of Historic Places listings in Johnson County, Missouri =

Location of Johnson County in Missouri

This is a list of the National Register of Historic Places listings in Johnson County, Missouri.

This is intended to be a complete list of the properties and districts on the National Register of Historic Places in Johnson County, Missouri, United States. Latitude and longitude coordinates are provided for many National Register properties and districts; these locations may be seen together in a map.

There are 22 properties and districts listed on the National Register in the county.

This National Park Service list is complete through NPS recent listings posted March 14, 2025.

== Current listings ==
	Name on the Register	Image	Date listed	Location	City or town	Description
1	John A. Adams Farmstead Historic District		July 7, 1994 (#94000701)	431 SE Y Highway; 38°41′46″N 93°39′58″W	Warrensburg	
2	Camp Shawnee Historic District		March 4, 1985 (#85000506)	Southwest of Knob Noster; 38°44′57″N 93°37′07″W	Knob Noster	
3	Chilhowee Historic District	Chilhowee Historic District	June 2, 1988 (#88000650)	Roughly Walnut and Main Sts. 38°35′16″N 93°51′21″W	Chilhowee	
4	Herbert A. and Bettie E. Cress House	Herbert A. and Bettie E. Cress House	October 12, 1995 (#95001174)	222 W. Gay St. 38°45′58″N 93°44′40″W	Warrensburg	
5	Garden of Eden Station	Garden of Eden Station	April 8, 1994 (#94000313)	Junction of MO 13 and County Road 215NW; 38°47′29″N 93°44′31″W	Warrensburg	
6	Lewis and Sophie Griebel House	Lewis and Sophie Griebel House	October 31, 2012 (#12000895)	300 W. Gay St. 38°45′58″N 93°44′43″W	Warrensburg	
7	Grover Street Victorian Historic District	Grover Street Victorian Historic District	July 18, 2012 (#12000417)	209, 210, 211, 212, 214, 216, & 218 Grover St. 38°45′43″N 93°44′14″W	Warrensburg	
8	Holden and Pine Streets Commercial Historic District	Holden and Pine Streets Commercial Historic District	April 3, 2017 (#100000825)	Roughly bounded by Maynard, N. College, E. Gay, W. Market, Marshall & Railroad Sts. & N. Washington Ave. 38°45′56″N 93°44′25″W	Warrensburg	
9	Howard School	Howard School	February 14, 2002 (#02000046)	400 W. Culton St. 38°45′51″N 93°43′32″W	Warrensburg	Demolished in 2015 after the roof collapsed.
10	Johnson County Courthouse	Johnson County Courthouse	April 7, 1994 (#94000288)	Courthouse Sq. 38°45′54″N 93°44′26″W	Warrensburg	
11	Johnson County Courthouse	Johnson County Courthouse	June 15, 1970 (#70000338)	Old Public Sq. 38°45′56″N 93°45′05″W	Warrensburg	
12	Jones Brothers Mule Barn	Jones Brothers Mule Barn	February 22, 2011 (#11000045)	101 N. College Ave. 38°45′46″N 93°44′17″W	Warrensburg	
13	Magnolia Mills	Magnolia Mills	October 3, 1996 (#96001064)	200 W. Pine St. 38°45′47″N 93°44′35″W	Warrensburg	
14	Masonic Temple	Masonic Temple	December 24, 1998 (#98001544)	101-103 W. Market St., and 301-303 N. Holden St. 38°45′55″N 93°44′23″W	Warrensburg	
15	Joseph M. Miller Mausoleum	Joseph M. Miller Mausoleum	January 29, 2018 (#100002036)	.8 mi. N of jct. of MO 131 & 2nd St. 38°43′49″N 93°59′34″W	Holden	
16	Montserrat Recreation Demonstration Area Bridge	Montserrat Recreation Demonstration Area Bridge	March 4, 1985 (#85000507)	MO 132; 38°45′13″N 93°34′36″W	Knob Noster	
17	Montserrat Recreation Demonstration Area Dam and Spillway	Montserrat Recreation Demonstration Area Dam and Spillway	March 4, 1985 (#85000508)	Southwest of Knob Noster; 38°44′57″N 93°34′11″W	Knob Noster	
18	Montserrat Recreation Demonstration Area Entrance Portal		March 4, 1985 (#85000509)	Off MO 132; 38°45′55″N 93°34′00″W	Knob Noster	No longer exists
19	Montserrat Recreational Demonstration Area Rock Bath House	Montserrat Recreational Demonstration Area Rock Bath House	March 4, 1985 (#85000510)	Southwest of Knob Noster; 38°44′58″N 93°34′19″W	Knob Noster	
20	Montserrat Recreational Demonstration Area Warehouse No. 2 and Workshop		March 4, 1985 (#85000511)	Off MO 132; 38°45′11″N 93°34′43″W	Knob Noster	
21	Pleasant View School	Pleasant View School	August 5, 1999 (#99000935)	674 SW 131 Highway; 38°40′15″N 94°00′22″W	Medford	
22	Warren Street Methodist Episcopal Church	Warren Street Methodist Episcopal Church	December 13, 1996 (#96001483)	201 S. Warren St. 38°45′43″N 93°44′41″W	Warrensburg	

== See also ==
- List of National Historic Landmarks in Missouri
- National Register of Historic Places listings in Missouri
