= Crest Ridge R-VII School District =

School district in Missouri, U.S.

Crest Ridge R-VII School District was formed in 1979 and originally named the Johnson County R-VII School District.

== Area ==
The school district encompasses 140 square miles (360 km^{2}) in North Central Johnson County, Missouri. The school district includes residents from the small towns of Centerview, Columbus and Fayetteville. The school district operates one elementary school, one middle school and one high school. All of which are now located at the intersection of US Highway 50 and Route 58.

== History ==
The Johnson County R-VII School District was formed in 1979 after the Johnson County Board of Education submitted a plan of reorganization to the State Board of Education for their review. At the urging of the Farmers and Centerview Boards of Education, a proposal was placed on the February, 1979 ballot and approved. Thus forming the Johnson County R-VII.

The school's mascot is the Cougar and the colors are green and white (but are sometimes green and gold are used because of the agriculture background and John Deere).
