= Chilhowee, Missouri =

Village in Johnson County, Missouri, United States

- Village
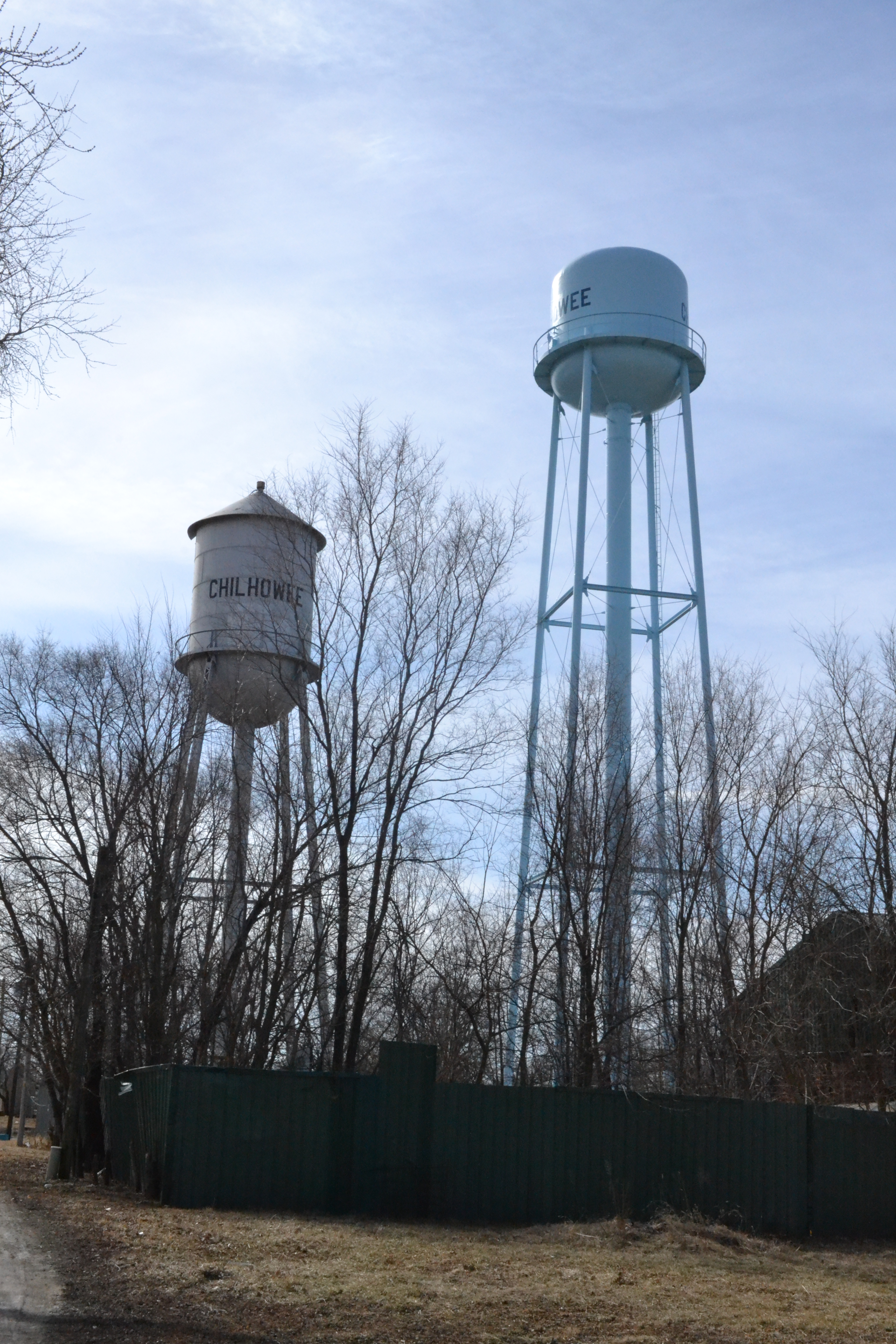

- Location of Chilhowee, Missouri
- Coordinates: 38°35′19″N 93°51′21″W
- Country: United States
- State: Missouri
- County: Johnson

Area
  - Total: 0.36 sq mi (0.93 km^{2})
  - Land: 0.36 sq mi (0.93 km^{2})
  - Water: 0 sq mi (0.00 km^{2})
- Elevation: 915 ft (279 m)

Population (2020)
  - Total: 291
  - Density: 807.1/sq mi (311.64/km^{2})
- Time zone: UTC-6 (Central (CST))
  - Summer (DST): UTC-5 (CDT)
- ZIP code: 64733
- Area code: 660
- FIPS code: 29-13654
- GNIS feature ID: 2396643

Chilhowee is a village in south central Johnson County, Missouri, United States. It is situated along Missouri Route 2. The population was 291 at the 2020 census.

== History ==
Chilhowee was originally called Simpson's Store, and under the latter name was founded in the mid-1850s, and named after James Simpson, a local merchant. A post office called Chilhowee has been in operation since 1859. The present name is of Native American origin.

The Chilhowee Historic District was listed on the National Register of Historic Places in 1988.

== Geography ==
Chilhowee is located on Missouri Route 2 approximately two miles west of Post Oak and Missouri Route 13. Old Chilhowee is one mile north on Missouri Route F and Denton is four miles to the northwest on Route 2. The location is on the broad drainage divide between Post Oak Creek to the north and Big Creek tributaries to the south.

According to the United States Census Bureau, the village has a total area of 0.38 square miles (0.98 km^{2}), all land.

== Demographics ==
Historical population
Census	Pop.	Note	%±
1870	185		—
1880	86		−53.5%
1910	425		—
1920	469		10.4%
1930	414		−11.7%
1940	415		0.2%
1950	335		−19.3%
1960	339		1.2%
1970	297		−12.4%
1980	349		17.5%
1990	335		−4.0%
2000	329		−1.8%
2010	325		−1.2%
2020	291		−10.5%
U.S. Decennial Census

=== 2010 census ===
As of the census of 2010, there were 325 people, 129 households, and 85 families living in the village. The population density was 855.3 inhabitants per square mile (330.2/km^{2}). There were 163 housing units at an average density of 428.9 per square mile (165.6/km^{2}). The racial makeup of the village was 95.4% White, 0.9% Native American, and 3.7% from two or more races. Hispanic or Latino of any race were 1.2% of the population.

There were 129 households, of which 36.4% had children under the age of 18 living with them, 42.6% were married couples living together, 14.0% had a female householder with no husband present, 9.3% had a male householder with no wife present, and 34.1% were non-families. 28.7% of all households were made up of individuals, and 15.5% had someone living alone who was 65 years of age or older. The average household size was 2.52 and the average family size was 3.02.

The median age in the village was 35.1 years. 29.8% of residents were under the age of 18; 7.8% were between the ages of 18 and 24; 25.6% were from 25 to 44; 21.5% were from 45 to 64; and 15.4% were 65 years of age or older. The gender makeup of the village was 50.5% male and 49.5% female.

=== 2000 census ===
As of the census of 2000, there were 329 people, 142 households, and 78 families living in the village. The population density was 858.6 inhabitants per square mile (331.5/km^{2}). There were 165 housing units at an average density of 430.6 per square mile (166.3/km^{2}). The racial makeup of the village was 95.74% White, 0.61% African American, 0.30% Native American, and 3.34% from two or more races.

There were 142 households, out of which 28.9% had children under the age of 18 living with them, 46.5% were married couples living together, 7.0% had a female householder with no husband present, and 44.4% were non-families. 39.4% of all households were made up of individuals, and 23.2% had someone living alone who was 65 years of age or older. The average household size was 2.32 and the average family size was 3.20.

In the village the population was spread out, with 26.1% under the age of 18, 9.7% from 18 to 24, 29.2% from 25 to 44, 18.2% from 45 to 64, and 16.7% who were 65 years of age or older. The median age was 37 years. For every 100 females there were 98.2 males. For every 100 females age 18 and over, there were 99.2 males.

The median income for a household in the village was $29,688, and the median income for a family was $45,938. Males had a median income of $27,500 versus $20,625 for females. The per capita income for the village was $14,850. About 4.1% of families and 9.3% of the population were below the poverty line, including 11.7% of those under age 18 and 19.2% of those age 65 or over.

== Points of interest ==
- Rock Island Spur Trailhead

== See also ==
- List of cities in Missouri
