= Missouri Route 2 =

State highway in Missouri, U.S.

Route 2

Route information
- Maintained by MoDOT
- Length: 69.478 mi (111.814 km)

Major junctions
- West end: K-68 at the Kansas state line in West Line
- I-49 / US 71 / Route 7 in Harrisonville; Route 131 in Medford; Route 13 north of Post Oak; Route 23 in Bowen
- East end: Route 52 in Windsor

Location
- Country: United States
- State: Missouri

Highway system
- Missouri State Highway System; Interstate; US; State; Supplemental
← Route 1	→ Route 3

Route 2 is a highway in western Missouri. Its western terminus is at the Kansas state line about three miles (4.8 km) southwest of West Line; it continues into Kansas as K-68. Its eastern terminus is at Route 52 in Windsor.

== Route description ==
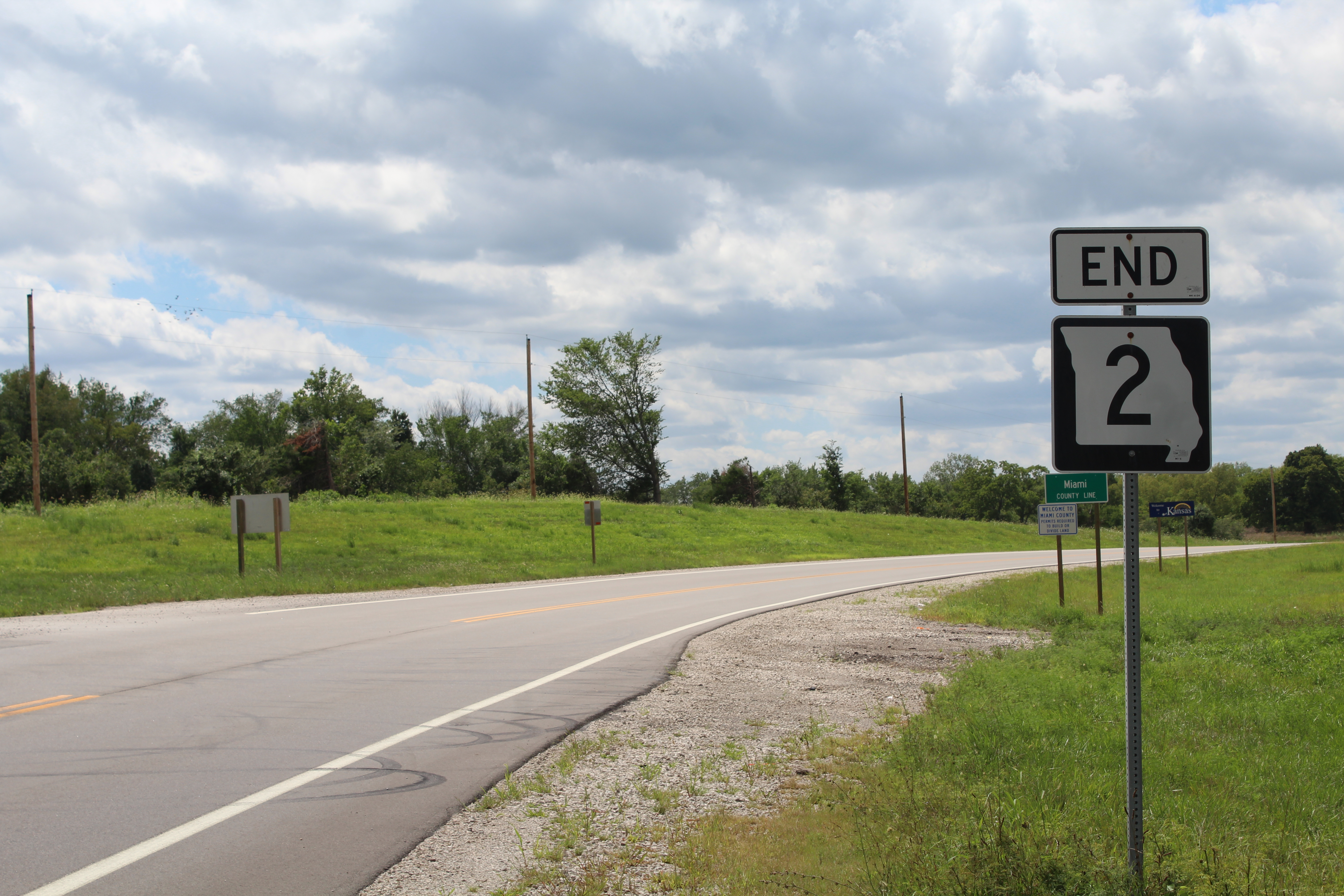
The western terminus of Route 2 at the Kansas state line

Route 2 begins at the Kansas state line in Cass County. The first town is passes through is West Line, followed by Freeman. In Harrisonville it has a brief concurrency with Interstate 49/U.S. Route 71 and Missouri Route 7. After splitting from I-49/US 71, it runs east into Johnson County, Missouri, crossing over near La Tour. It serves as the southern terminus of Route 131 before crossing Route 13 north of Postoak. It then runs through Leeton before entering Henry County. It then ends at Route 52.

== History ==
Route 2 was initially Route 60, designated in 1922 between Leeton and Windsor. It was renumbered in 1926 due to US 60.

== Junction list ==
County	Location	mi	km	Destinations	Notes
Cass		0.000	0.000	K-68 west	Continuation into Kansas
Cass	Harrisonville	16.377	26.356	I-49 / US 71 / Route 7	Northern end of I-49 / US-71 / Route 7 concurrency, I-49 exit 159
Cass	Harrisonville	17.519	28.194	I-49 / US 71 / Route 7	Northern end of I-49 / US-71 / Route 7 concurrency, I-49 exit 158
Johnson		38.457	61.891	Route 131	Southern terminus of Route 131
Johnson		54.094	87.056	Route 13	
Henry		65.724	105.773	Route 23	Southern terminus of Route 23
Henry	Windsor	69.478	111.814	Route 52	Eastern terminus
1.000 mi = 1.609 km; 1.000 km = 0.621 mi: Concurrency terminus
