= Sutherland, Missouri =

Unincorporated community in the U.S. state of Missouri

Coordinates: 38°35′06″N 93°35′34″W

Sutherland is an unincorporated community in southeast Johnson County, in the U.S. state of Missouri.

The community is on Missouri Route 23 approximately eleven miles south of Knob Noster. The community of Bowen is two miles south on the Johnson-Henry county line.

== History ==
Sutherland was laid out in 1898, and named after D. L. Sutherland, the original owner of the town site. A post office called Sutherland was established in 1897, and remained in operation until 1912.
