= Missouri Route 23 =

State highway in Missouri, U.S.

Route 23

Route information
- Maintained by MoDOT
- Length: 47 mi (76 km)

Major junctions
- South end: Route 2 west of Windsor
- US 50 in Knob Noster; I-70 / US 40 in Concordia
- North end: US 24 near Waverly

Location
- Country: United States
- State: Missouri

Highway system
- Missouri State Highway System; Interstate; US; State; Supplemental
← Route 22	→ US 24

Route 23 is a 47-mile long highway in west-central Missouri. Its northern terminus is at U.S. Route 24 near Waverly; its southern terminus is at Route 2 west of Windsor. Route 23 also provides access to Whiteman Air Force Base just south of Knob Noster, around which it supports its highest traffic volume of more than 8,000 vehicles a day.

== Route description ==
Missouri Route 23 begins at a junction with Route 2 west of Windsor in Henry County. The highway heads northerly through rural farmland, passing through the unincorporated community of Bowen before entering Johnson County. About 15 miles (24 km) north of Windsor, Route 23 reaches Whiteman Air Force Base, where it intersects Spirit Boulevard, providing access to the base and surrounding facilities.

Continuing north, Route 23 enters the city of Knob Noster, where it meets US 50 at an interchange. The highway briefly runs parallel to US 50 before diverging and heading northeasterly through rolling terrain. After passing through the unincorporated community of Montserrat, Route 23 enters Lafayette County and reaches Concordia, where it intersects I-70 and US 40 at exit 58.

Leaving Concordia, Route 23 continues northward, passing through the unincorporated community of Middleton before reaching Alma, where it meets Route 20. The highway then proceeds northeasterly through agricultural landscapes, crossing several small creeks before reaching its northern terminus at US 24 near Waverly.

== History ==
Route 23 had its beginnings in the early 1930s around Alma. In the late 1940s, it was still a short gravel route that went as far south as Concordia. By the 1950s it was paved and by 1970 it reached as far south as Knob Noster. Finally, at the turn of the century, it reached its present southern terminus at Route 2 south of Bowen.

== Major intersections ==
County	Location	mi	km	Destinations	Notes
Henry	Windsor Township	0.000	0.000	Route 2 – Windsor	
Johnson	Washington Township	15.819	25.458	Spirit Boulevard – Whiteman AFB	
Johnson	Knob Noster	18.179	29.256	US 50 – Kansas City, Jefferson City	Interchange
Lafayette	Concordia	35.376	56.932	I-70 / US 40 – Kansas City, Saint Louis	I-70 exit 58
Lafayette	Alma	43.362	69.784	Route 20 – Higginsville, Marshall	
Lafayette	Middleton Township	49.883	80.279	US 24 – Kansas City, Waverly	
1.000 mi = 1.609 km; 1.000 km = 0.621 mi
