= La Tour, Missouri =

- Census-designated place and Unincorporated Community
- Location of La Tour, Missouri
- Coordinates: 38°38′04″N 94°06′08″W
- Country: United States
- State: Missouri
- County: Johnson

Area
  - Total: 0.11 sq mi (0.28 km^{2})
  - Land: 0.11 sq mi (0.28 km^{2})
  - Water: 0 sq mi (0.00 km^{2})
- Elevation: 817 ft (249 m)

Population (2020)
  - Total: 65
  - Density: 593.5/sq mi (229.15/km^{2})
- Time zone: UTC-6 (Central (CST))
  - Summer (DST): UTC-5 (CDT)
- ZIP Code: 64747
- FIPS code: 29-40880
- GNIS feature ID: 2587086

La Tour or Latour is an unincorporated community in southwestern Johnson County, Missouri, United States. The population was 65 at the 2000 census, at which time it was a village. La Tour disincorporated in 2009, and at the 2010 census the community, now listed as a census-designated place (CDP), had a population of 62.

== History ==
La Tour was platted in 1885, and named after the local Latour family. A post office called Latour was established in 1886, and remained in operation until 1997.

La Tour disincorporated on April 13, 2009, after an April 7 vote on the subject passed by the margin of 20 to 1.

== Geography ==
The community is located in southwestern Johnson County on Missouri Route 2, about 14 miles (23 km) east of Harrisonville and 36 miles (58 km) west of Windsor. The community lies just southwest of the confluence of Camp Branch with Big Creek.

According to the United States Census Bureau, the CDP has a total area of 0.11 square miles (0.28 km^{2}), about the same as the former village. 0.2 acres (934 m^{2}), or 0.33% of the community's area, is water.

== Demographics ==
Historical population
Census	Pop.	Note	%±
2020	65		—
U.S. Decennial Census

As of the census of 2000, there were 65 people, 23 households, and 18 families residing in the village. The population density was 583.4 inhabitants per square mile (225.3/km^{2}). There were 28 housing units at an average density of 251.3 per square mile (97.0/km^{2}). The racial makeup of the village was 96.92% White, 1.54% African American and 1.54% Asian.

There were 23 households, out of which 34.8% had children under the age of 18 living with them, 60.9% were married couples living together, 8.7% had a female householder with no husband present, and 17.4% were non-families. 13.0% of all households were made up of individuals, and 8.7% had someone living alone who was 65 years of age or older. The average household size was 2.83 and the average family size was 3.05.

In the village, the population was spread out, with 27.7% under the age of 18, 7.7% from 18 to 24, 27.7% from 25 to 44, 26.2% from 45 to 64, and 10.8% who were 65 years of age or older. The median age was 33 years. For every 100 females, there were 103.1 males. For every 100 females age 18 and over, there were 113.6 males.

The median income for a household in the village was $38,250, and the median income for a family was $38,750. Males had a median income of $51,250 versus $21,250 for females. The per capita income for the village was $15,684. There were 26.3% of families and 21.3% of the population living below the poverty line, including no under eighteens and 20.0% of those over 64.
