= Scaly Bark Creek =

Stream in the American state of Missouri

Scaly Bark Creek is a stream in Johnson County in the U.S. state of Missouri. It is a tributary of Big Creek.

The stream source is at 38°40′10″N 94°00′59″W approximately 1.5 miles north of the community of Medford. The stream flows generally south-southwest to its confluence with Big Creek at 38°35′42″N 94°03′01″W.

The creek was named for the condition of the bark of the hickory trees lining its course.

== See also ==
- List of rivers of Missouri
