= Rose Hill Township, Johnson County, Missouri =

Township in Johnson County, Missouri, U.S.

Coordinates: 38.62°N 94.00°W

Rose Hill Township is an inactive township in Johnson County, in the U.S. state of Missouri.

Rose Hill Township was established in 1849, taking its name from the community of Rose Hill, Missouri.
