= Windsor High School =

Windsor High School may refer to:

== Australia ==
- Windsor High School (New South Wales), in Windsor, New South Wales

== South Africa ==
- Windsor High School (Cape Town)

== United Kingdom ==
- Windsor High School, Halesowen, England

== United States ==
- Windsor High School (California)
- Windsor High School (Colorado)
- Windsor High School (Connecticut)
- Windsor High School (Imperial, Missouri)
- Windsor High School (Windsor, Missouri), part of the Henry County R-1 School District
- Windsor High School (Vermont)
- Windsor High School (Virginia)

== See also ==
- West Windsor-Plainsboro High School North in Plainsboro Township, New Jersey, United States
- West Windsor-Plainsboro High School South in Princeton Junction, New Jersey, United States
