= Bowmansville =

Bowmansville may refer to:

- Bowmansville, Missouri, an unincorporated community in Johnson County
- Bowmansville, New York, a hamlet in the town of Lancaster in Erie County
- Bowmansville, Pennsylvania, an unincorporated community and a census-designated place in Brecknock Township in Lancaster County
