= Knob Noster R-VIII School District =

School district in Missouri, U.S.

School District of Knob Noster R-8 is in Knob Noster, Johnson County, Missouri, USA. The Knob Noster R-8 school district covers the cities and communities of Knob Noster, WAFB, and Montserrat. As of 2006 the school district had 1,595 students, 168 certified staff members, and 4 schools.

== Schools ==
=== High schools ===
- Knob Noster High School holds grades 9–12.

=== Middle School High ===
- Knob Noster Middle School supports students in grades 6–8. The school is housed in a building that was originally the high school.

=== Elementary schools ===
Knob Noster elementary schools are organized in two categories: Whiteman AFB students and Knob Noster Students. The Elementary Schools contain grades K-5.

- Knob Noster Elementary
- Whiteman Elementary
