= Pleasant View School (Medford, Missouri) =

- U.S. National Register of Historic Places
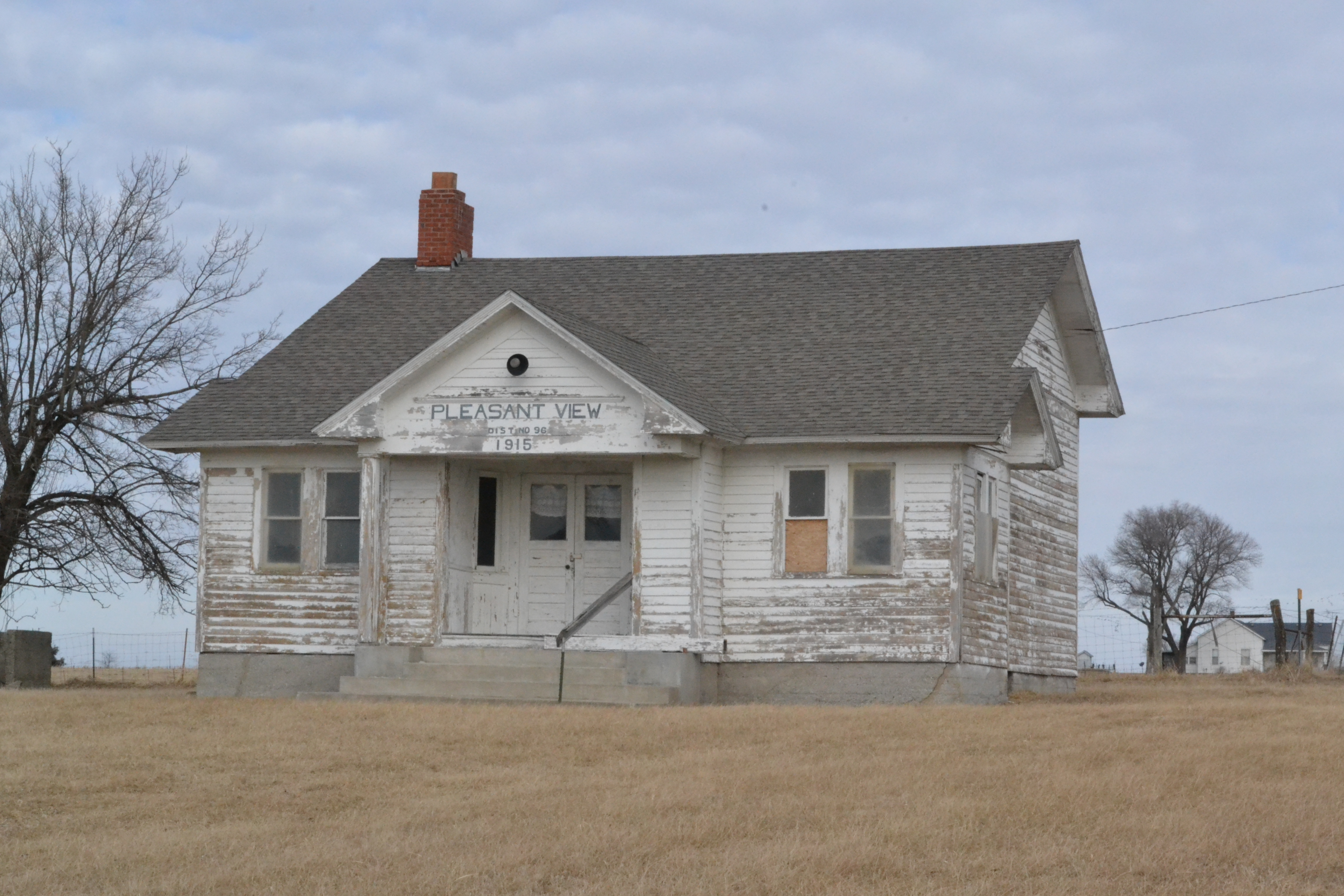

- Location within Missouri Location within the United States
- Location: 674 SW 131 Highway, near Medford, Missouri
- Coordinates: 38°40′15″N 94°0′22″W
- Area: less than one acre
- Built: 1915
- Built by: Layton, J.W.
- Architectural style: One room schoolhouse
- NRHP reference No.: 99000935
- Added to NRHP: August 5, 1999

Pleasant View School is a historic one-room school located near Medford, Johnson County, Missouri. It was built in 1915, and is a one-story, side-gabled, bungaloid frame building. The blackboard, desks, book cases, a water cooler and an oil stove are intact from when the building was last used as a schoolhouse in 1957. Also on the property are the contributing school privy, the foundation of a coal storage building, and a well with a hand pump.

It was listed on the National Register of Historic Places in 1999.
