= Quick City, Missouri =

Unincorporated community in Missouri, U.S.

Coordinates: 38°34′52″N 94°01′44″W

Quick City is an unincorporated community in southwestern Johnson County, in the U.S. state of Missouri. The community is on the north bank of Big Creek approximately three miles (4.8 km) northwest of Blairstown in adjacent Henry County.

== History ==
Quick City was platted in 1886 by Morris Quick, and named for him. A post office called Quick City was established in 1886, and remained in operation until 1967.
