= Cornelia, Missouri =

Unincorporated community in the U.S. state of Missouri

Coordinates: 38°38′37″N 93°44′22″W

Cornelia is an unincorporated community in southern Johnson County, in the U.S. state of Missouri.

The community is on Missouri Route 13 seven miles south of Warrensburg and five miles north of Post Oak.

== History ==
A post office called Cornelia was established in 1855, and remained in operation until 1904. The community was named after Cornelia Love, the wife of an early settler. A variant name was "Shanghai". The reason it was called Shanghai was that Dr. Love, who founded the community, raised Shanghai chickens.
