= Valley City, Missouri =

Unincorporated community in Missouri, U.S.

Coordinates: 38°51′56″N 93°36′43″W

Valley City is an unincorporated community in northeast Johnson County, in the U.S. state of Missouri.

The community is on Missouri Route MM approximately seven miles north-northeast of Knob Noster. The community sits above a small tributary stream valley approximately one-half mile east of the Blackwater River.

== History ==
A post office called Valley City was established in 1887, and remained in operation until 1903. The community was so named due to its setting in a valley. Earlier names include Gallaher's Mill, Kirkpatrick Mill, Millford, and Grover.
