= Denton, Johnson County, Missouri =

Unincorporated community in the U.S. state of Missouri

Coordinates: 38°36′48″N 93°55′45″W

Denton is an unincorporated community in southern Johnson County, in the U.S. state of Missouri.

The community is on Missouri Route 2 miles northwest of Chilhowee. The Chicago, Rock Island and Pacific Railroad passes the south side of the community.

== History ==
Denton was laid out in 1905, and named after a railroad employee. A post office called Denton was established in 1905, and remained in operation until 1954.
