= Warren Street Methodist Episcopal Church =

Historic church in Missouri, United States

- U.S. National Register of Historic Places
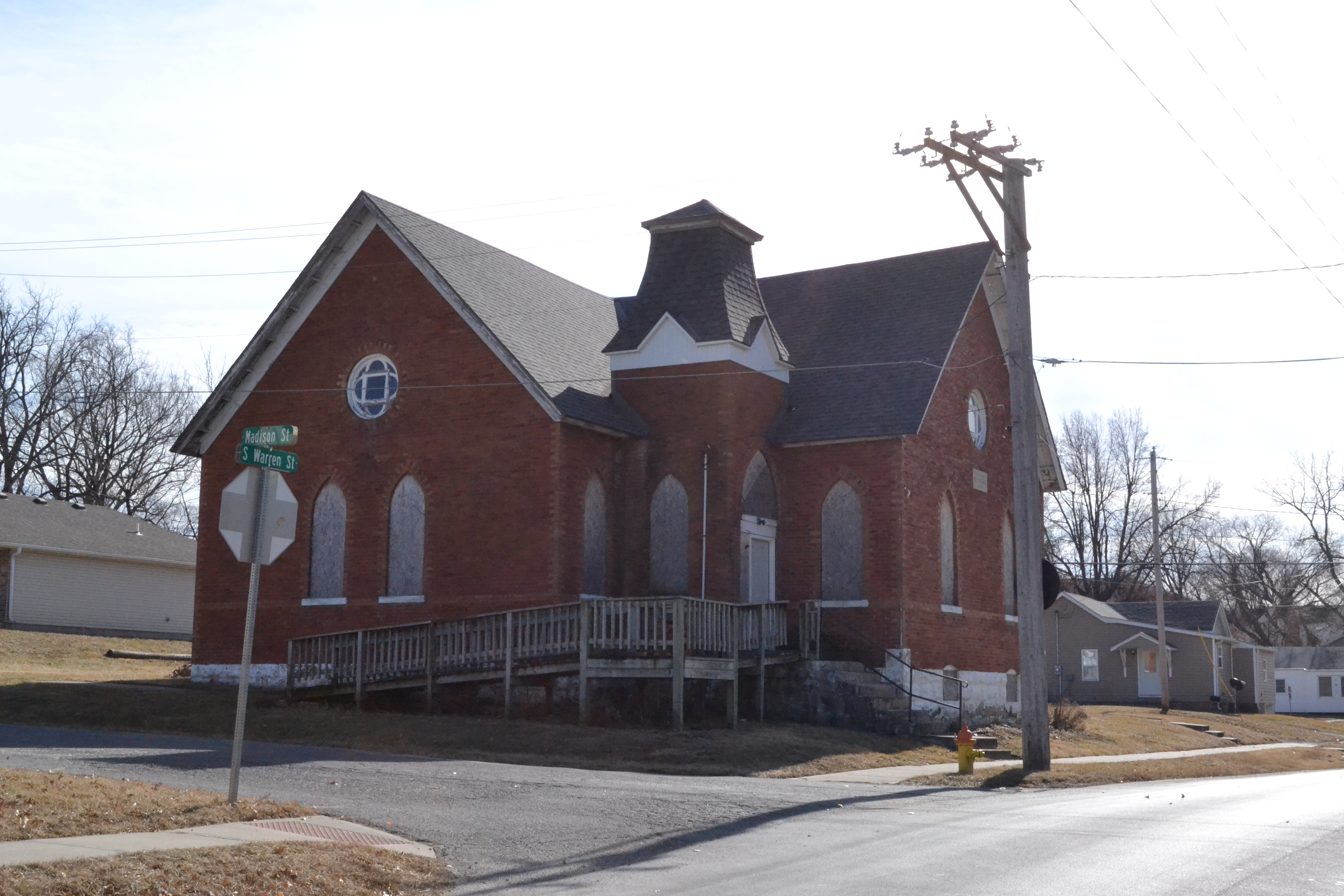

- Location within Missouri Location within the United States
- Location: 201 S. Warren St., Warrensburg, Missouri
- Coordinates: 38°45′43″N 93°44′41″W
- Area: less than one acre
- Built: 1898-1899
- Architect: King, John W.
- Architectural style: Late Gothic Revival
- NRHP reference No.: 96001483
- Added to NRHP: December 13, 1996

Warren Street Methodist Episcopal Church, also known as Warren Street United Methodist Church, is a historic Methodist church located at 201 South Warren Street in Warrensburg, Johnson County, Missouri. It was built in 1898–1899, and is a one-story, Late Gothic Revival style orange-tinted brick building. It features a square entrance tower with a concave dome and a gabled cornice. It was erected by a local African-American congregation.

It was listed on the National Register of Historic Places in 1996.
