= Owsley, Missouri =

Unincorporated community in Missouri, U.S.

Coordinates: 38°38′43″N 93°30′56″W

Owsley is an unincorporated community in eastern Johnson County, in the U.S. state of Missouri.

== History ==
Owsley was originally called Eldorado, and under the latter name was laid out in 1886. A post office called Owsley was established in 1877, and remained in operation until 1906. The present name is after Moses Owsley, an early settler.
