= Fulkerson, Missouri =

Unincorporated community in Missouri, U.S.

Coordinates: 38°51′16″N 94°05′21″W

Fulkerson is an unincorporated community in Johnson County, in the U.S. state of Missouri.

== History ==
A post office called Fulkerson was established in 1882, and remained in operation until 1904. The community was named after Reuben Fulkerson, an early settler.
