= Washington Township, Johnson County, Missouri =

Township in Johnson County, Missouri, U.S.

Coordinates: 38.77°N 93.53°W

Washington Township is an inactive township in Johnson County, in the U.S. state of Missouri.

Washington Township was established in 1835, taking its name from President George Washington.
