= Windsor Township, Henry County, Missouri =

Township in Henry County, Missouri, U.S.

Coordinates: 38.49°N 93.56°W

Windsor Township is a township in Henry County, in the U.S. state of Missouri.

Windsor Township takes its name from the community of Windsor, Missouri.
