= Knob Noster High School =

Public school in Missouri, United States

Location
- 504 S Washington; Knob Noster, Missouri 65336; United States; 38.76093°N 93.56101°W

Information
- Teaching staff: 35.65 (FTE)
- Grades: 9–12
- Enrollment: 474 (2024–2025)
- Student to teacher ratio: 13.30
- Color
- Mascot: Panther
- Website: www.knobnoster.k12.mo.us

Knob Noster High School is an American public high school located in Knob Noster, Missouri. It is part of the Knob Noster R-VIII School District.

== Sources ==
- Official Website
