= Grover Street Victorian Historic District =

Historic district in Missouri, United States

- U.S. National Register of Historic Places
- U.S. Historic district
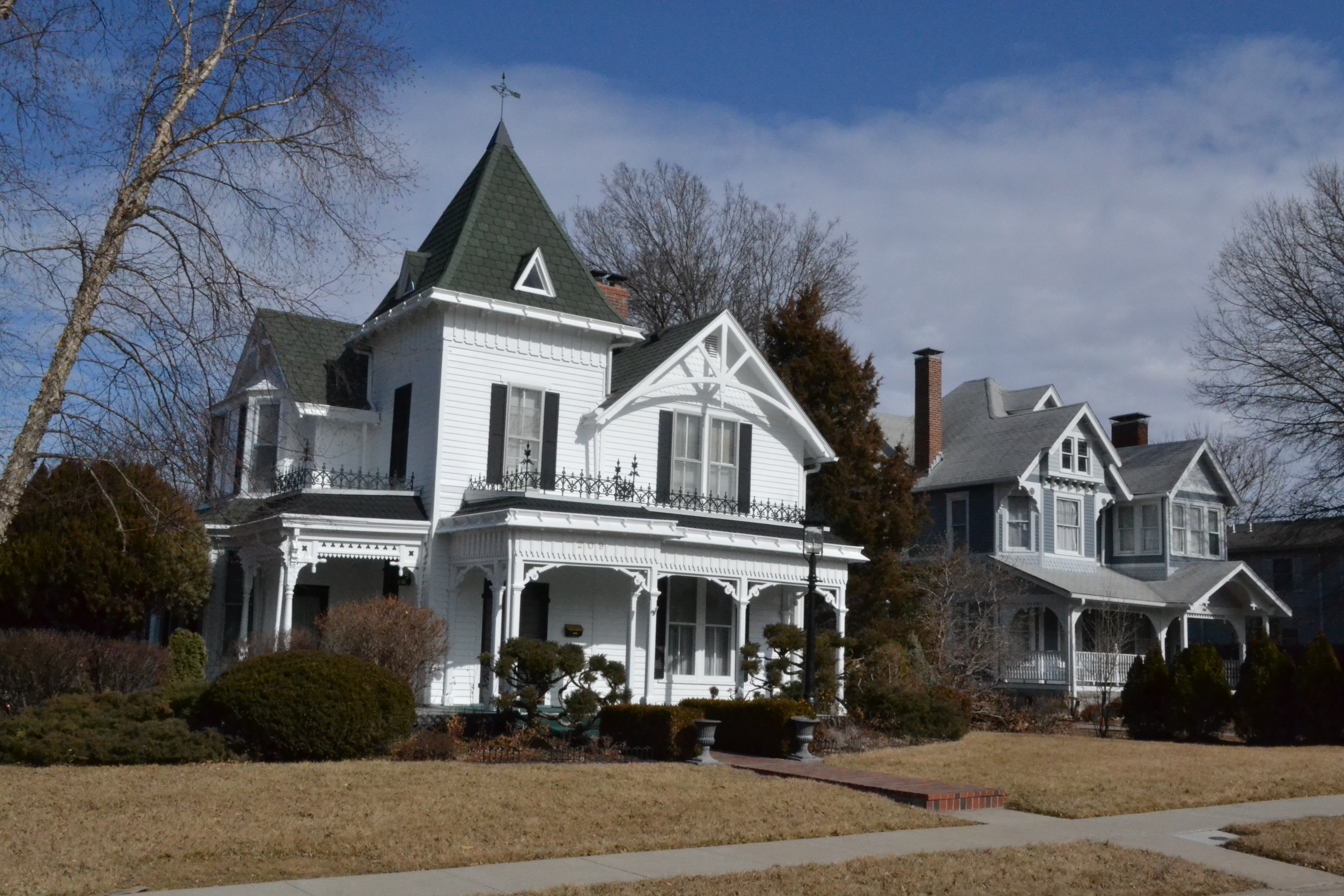
- The Jack House (left) and the Markward House (right)

- Location within Missouri Location within the United States
- Location: 209, 210, 211, 212, 214, 216, & 218 Grover St., Warrensburg, Missouri
- Coordinates: 38°45′43″N 93°44′14″W
- Area: 2.8 acres (1.1 ha)
- Architect: Barber, George/ Suddath, J. N.
- Architectural style: Stick/Eastlake,
- MPS: Historic and Architectural Resources of Warrensburg, MO MPDF
- NRHP reference No.: 12000417
- Added to NRHP: July 18, 2012

Grover Street Victorian Historic District is a national historic district located at Warrensburg, Johnson County, Missouri. The district encompasses nine contributing buildings in an exclusively residential section of Warrensburg. It developed between about 1887 and 1944 and includes representative examples of Queen Anne and Stick style / Eastlake movement style architecture. Notable contributing buildings include the Leonidus W. and Mary B. Jack House (c. 1887), Nick and Mamie Bradley House (c. 1902), Land and Rose Markward House (1903), William and Amanda Lee House (c. 1887), Alex and Nannie McElvain House (c. 1897), Builder Style house (c. 1944), and David and Martha Stewart House (c. 1887).

It was listed on the National Register of Historic Places in 2012.
