= Jones Brothers Mule Barn =

- U.S. National Register of Historic Places
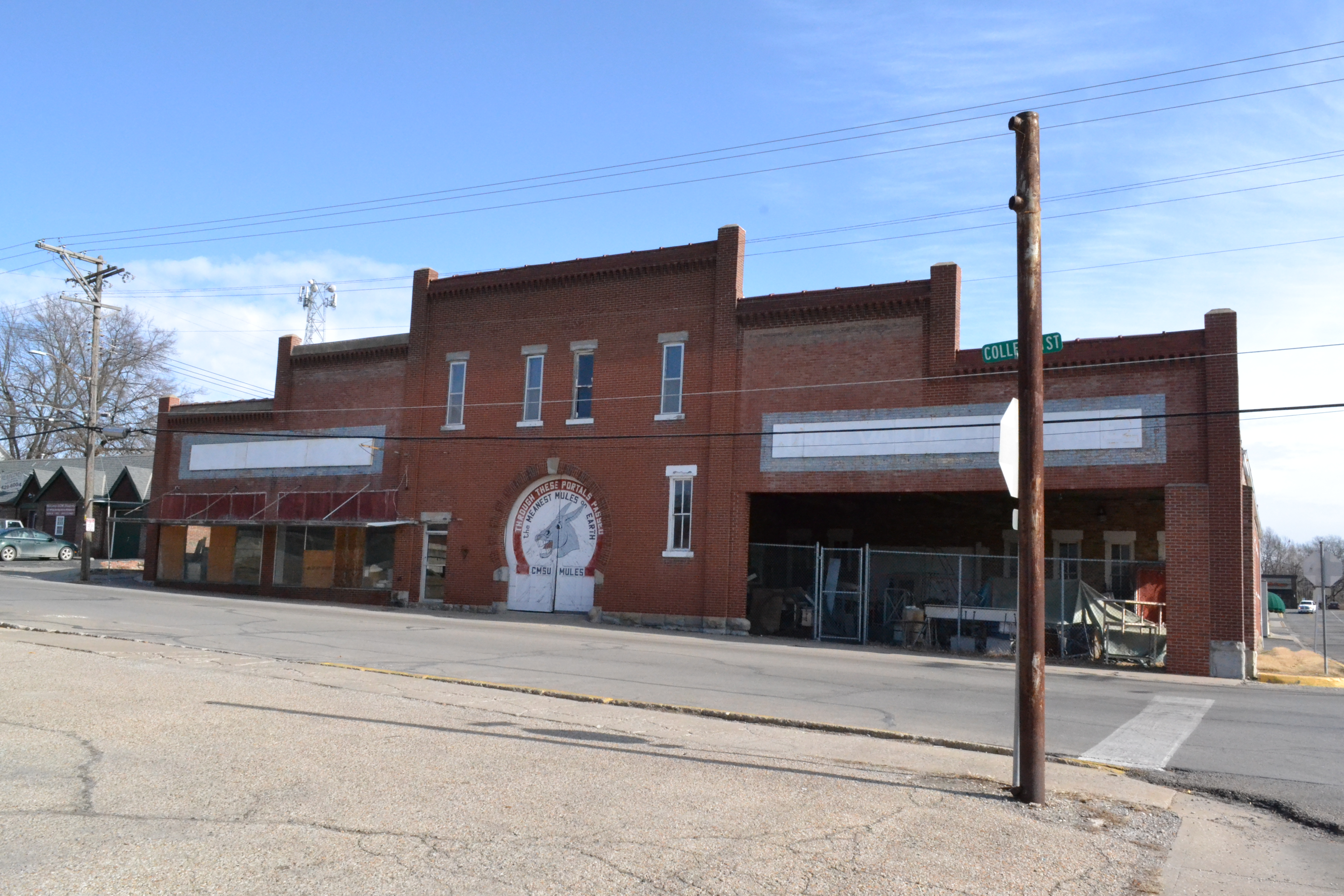

- Location within Missouri Location within the United States
- Location: 101 N. College Ave., Warrensburg, Missouri
- Coordinates: 38°45′46″N 93°44′17″W
- Area: less than one acre
- Built: 1912
- Architectural style: Mule barn
- NRHP reference No.: 11000045
- Added to NRHP: February 22, 2011

Jones Brothers Mule Barn, also known as Cassingham & Son Hardware Store, is a historic mule barn located at Warrensburg, Johnson County, Missouri. It was built in 1912, and consists of a two-story main block with a monitor roof and one-story rear ell. It is constructed of red brick and sits on a stone foundation. It was built as mule sales barn, and later served as a hardware store.

It was listed on the National Register of Historic Places in 2010.
