= Herbert A. and Bettie E. Cress House =

Historic house in Missouri, United States

- U.S. National Register of Historic Places
- Location within Missouri Location within the United States
- Location: 222 W. Gay St., Warrensburg, Missouri
- Coordinates: 38°45′58″N 93°44′40″W
- Area: less than one acre
- Built: 1888
- Architectural style: Queen Anne, Shingle Style
- NRHP reference No.: 95001174
- Added to NRHP: October 12, 1995

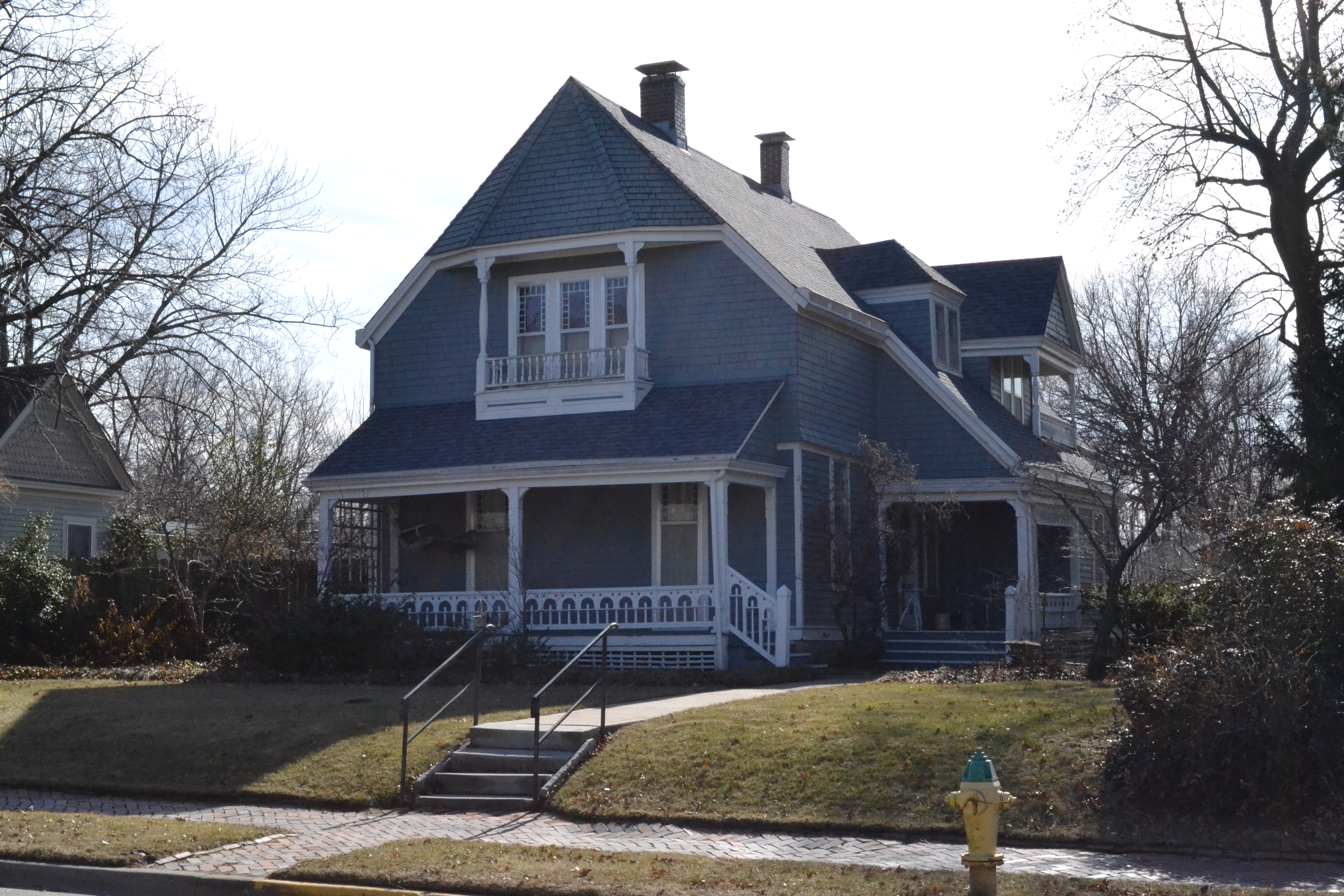

Herbert A. and Bettie E. Cress House is a historic home located at Warrensburg, Johnson County, Missouri. It was built about 1888, and is a 1 1/2-story, Queen Anne / Shingle Style frame dwelling. The first-story walls are of weatherboard (beveled siding), and the second-story walls are of sawn shingles. It sits on a sandstone foundation and features a full-width front porch and second story porch.

It was listed on the National Register of Historic Places in 1995.
