= Mount Olive, Missouri =

Unincorporated community in Missouri, U.S.

Coordinates: 38.900567°N 93.694939°W

Mount Olive is an unincorporated community in Johnson County, in the U.S. state of Missouri.

== History ==
A variant name was "Priest". Priest was the name of F.T. Priest, an early settler. A post office called Priest was established in 1899, and remained in operation until 1902.
