= Rock Island Trail State Park (Missouri) =

State park in the U.S. state of Missouri

Coordinates: 38.543°N 93.526°W

- Location of the Rock Island Trail in red and the Katy Trail in blue
- Length: 47.5 mi (76.4 km)
- Location: Missouri, United States
- Established: 2016
- Trailheads: Windsor, Leeton, Chilhowee, Medford, Pleasant Hill
- Use: Hiking, Cycling, Horseback
- Elevation change: negligible
- Difficulty: Easy
- Season: All
- Hazards: Severe weather Poison ivy Snakes
- Website: Rock Island Trail State Park

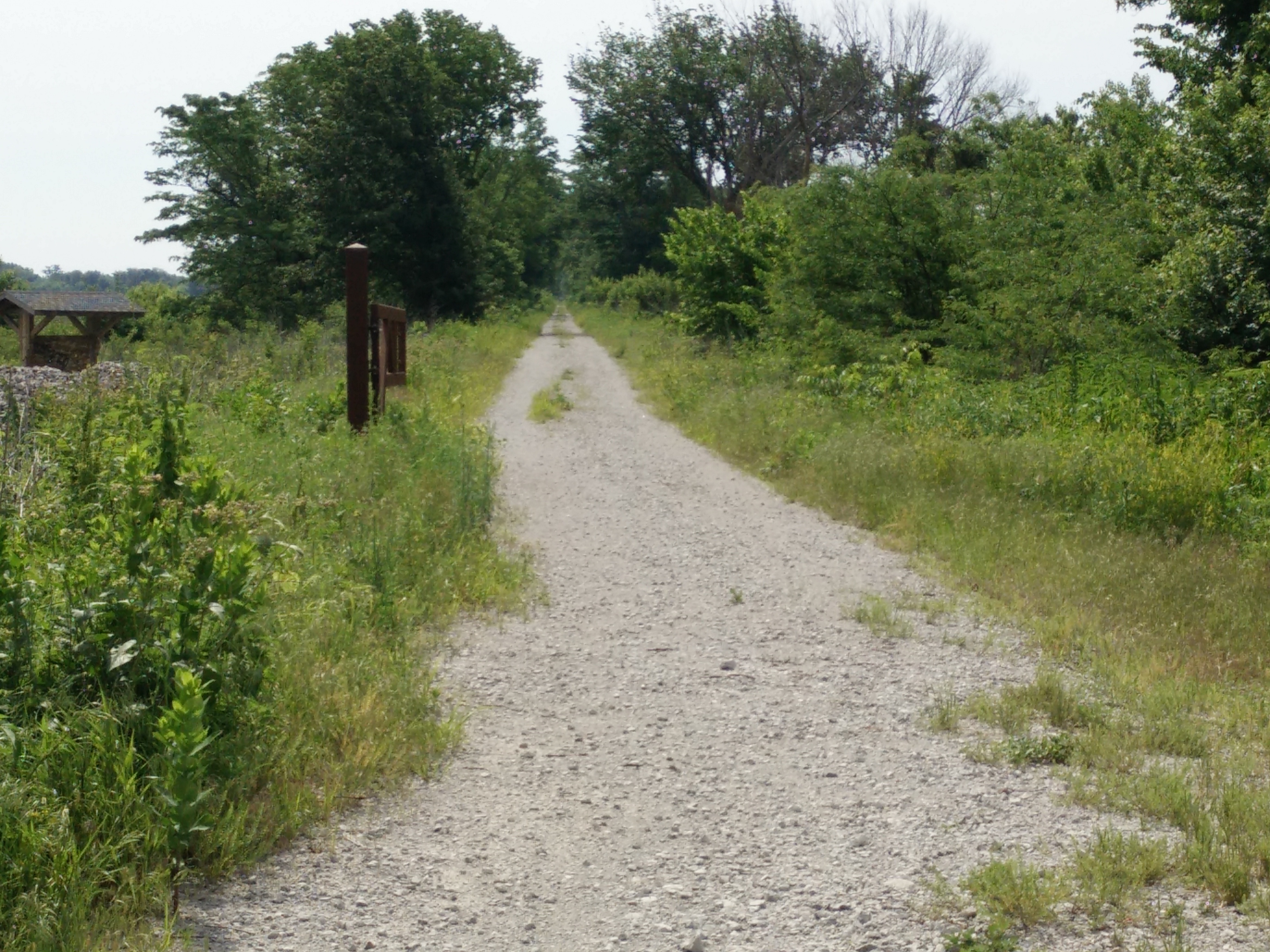
Rock Island Trail State Park, May 2016 (prior to the official opening of the trail in December 2016)

The Rock Island Spur of Katy Trail State Park is a state park in the U.S. state of Missouri that is 47-mile (76 km) rails to trails hiking and biking trail. Work on the trail was completed and the trail was opened on December 10, 2016. The trail provides residents of the Kansas City region direct trail access to the 240 mi (390 km) Katy Trail State Park, the longest rails to trails trail in the U.S.

== Description ==
The Rock Island Trail uses "abandoned" (embargoed and out of service) right-of-way of the Chicago, Rock Island and Pacific Railroad between Pleasant Hill in Cass County and Windsor in Henry County where it meets the Katy Trail. An additional 144 miles (232 km) of Rock Island right-of-way is in the process of rail banking by the Surface Transportation Board. Missouri State Parks is evaluating adding this additional 144 miles to the Rock Island Trail, extending it from Windsor to Beaufort. On December 19, 2019, the state signed an Interim Trail Use Agreement with Missouri Central Railroad Company, the Ameren subsidiary that owns the corridor. The agreement paves the way for transfer of the right-of-way to the state if certain conditions can be met by December 31, 2021, including identifying approximately 9.8 million dollars of funding. If completed the combined Rock Island and Katy trails will form a network of 450 miles (720 kilometres).

In May 2016, Jackson County, Missouri acquired 17.7 miles (28.5 km) of right-of-way from the Union Pacific Railroad, of section of line from the Truman Sports Complex to south part of Lee's Summit, to bring the trail into Kansas City. Work began in 2017, with the first half opened in 2018. There currently is a gap between Lee's Summit/Greenwood and Pleasant Hill, with the route unknown at this time.

== Route ==
The Rock Island Spur currently starts in Windsor at mile marker 216.5. It heads northwest, passing through Johnson County until it reaches its western terminus in Pleasant Hill at mile marker 262.9.

Trailhead	Mile-Marker
Windsor	216.5
Leeton	227
Chilhowee	235.6
Medford	245.4
Pleasant Hill	262.9

== See also ==
- Freeburg Tunnel
