= Greendoor, Missouri =

Unincorporated community in Missouri, U.S.

Coordinates: 38°49′16″N 93°49′37″W

Greendoor is an unincorporated community in Johnson County, in the U.S. state of Missouri.

== History ==
A post office called Greendoor was established in 1890, and remained in operation until 1902. The community was so named because the local post office had a green door.
