= Lewis and Sophie Griebel House =

Historic house in Missouri, United States

- U.S. National Register of Historic Places
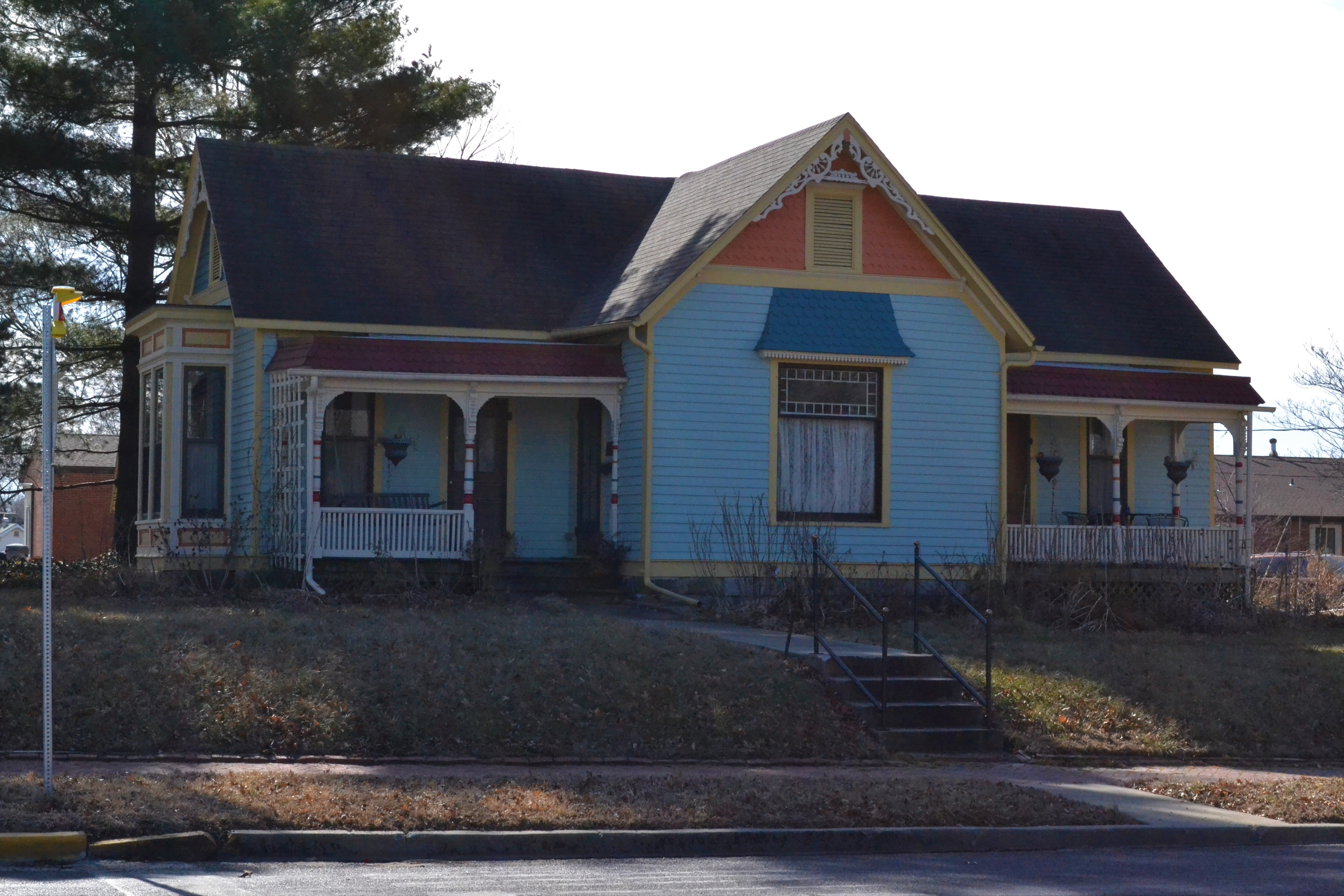

- Location within Missouri Location within the United States
- Location: 300 W. Gay St., Warrensburg, Missouri
- Coordinates: 38°45′58″N 93°44′43″W
- Area: less than one acre
- Built: c. 1885
- Architectural style: Folk Victorian
- MPS: Historic and Architectural Resources of Warrensburg, MO MPDF
- NRHP reference No.: 12000895
- Added to NRHP: October 31, 2012

Lewis and Sophie Griebel House is a historic home located at Warrensburg, Johnson County, Missouri. It was built about 1885, and is a one-story, cruciform-shaped, Folk Victorian frame dwelling. It has a steeply pitched cross-gabled roof and ornate porches with flat roofs fill the spaces between the wings. The house features two types of imbricated shingles, lacy vergeboards with spindles, turned porch supports, serrated brackets, and a three-sided oriel window with elaborated panels. Also on the property are the contributing garage and chicken house.

It was listed on the National Register of Historic Places in 2012.
