= Hoffman, Missouri =

Unincorporated community in Missouri, U.S.

Coordinates: 38.9244544°N 93.7602184°W

Hoffman is an unincorporated community in Johnson County, in the U.S. state of Missouri.

== History ==
A post office called Hoffman was established in 1892, and remained in operation until 1904. The community was named after George Hoffman, the original owner of the town site.
