= Magnolia, Missouri =

Unincorporated community in Missouri, U.S.

Coordinates: 38°38′21″N 93°54′51″W

Location of Magnolia within the state of Missouri

Magnolia is an unincorporated community in Johnson County, Missouri, United States.

== History ==
Magnolia was platted in 1896, and named the flowering plant magnolia. A post office called Magnolia was established in 1896, and remained in operation until 1953.
