= Elm, Missouri =

Unincorporated community in Missouri, U.S.

Coordinates: 38°51′12″N 94°02′33″W

Elm is an unincorporated community in Johnson County, in the U.S. state of Missouri.

== History ==
A post office called Elm was established in 1882, and remained in operation until 1903. The community took its name from a nearby spring where a large elm tree stood.
