= Chilhowee Historic District =

Historic district in Missouri, United States

- U.S. National Register of Historic Places
- U.S. Historic district
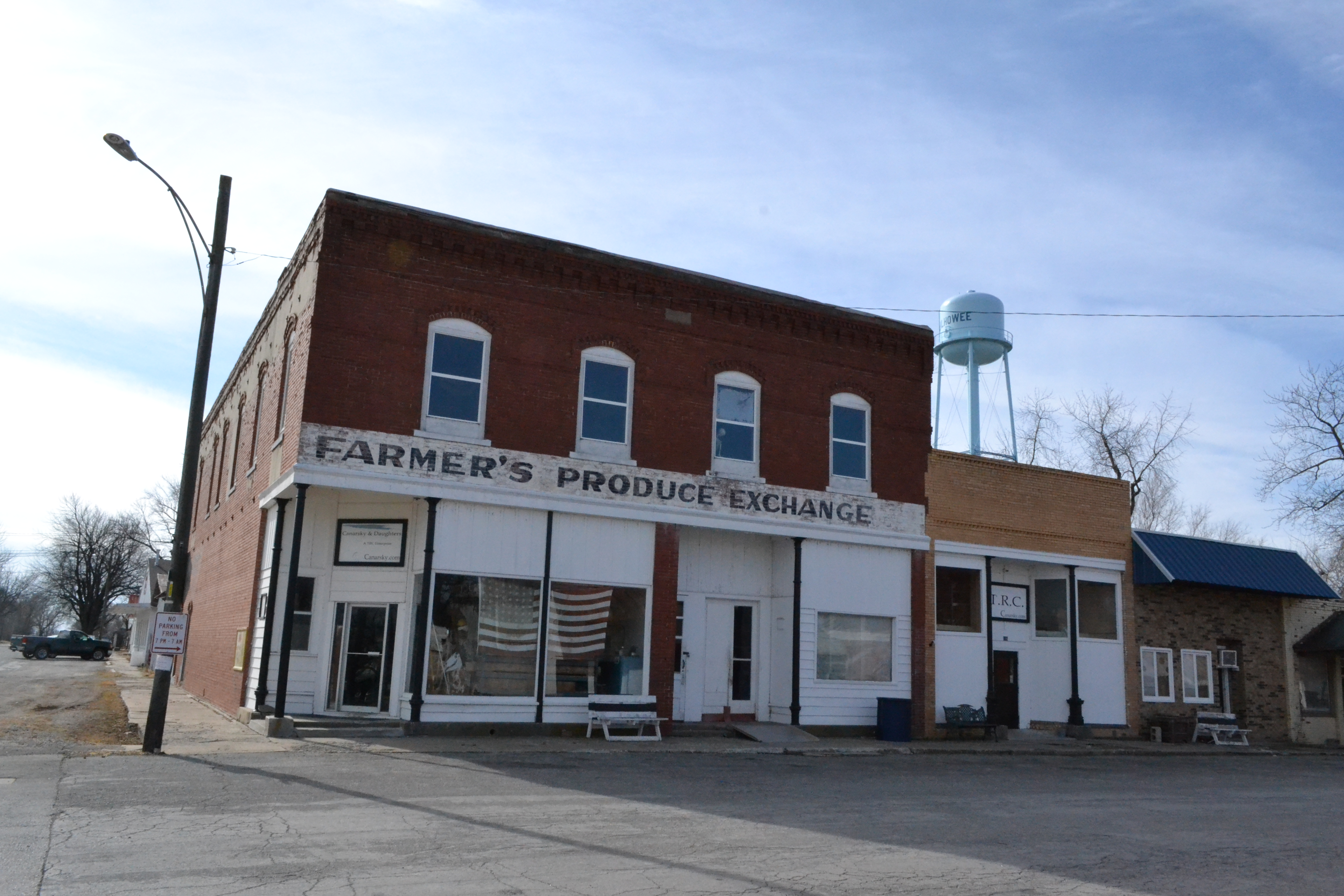
- Farmers Produce Exchange building

- Location within Missouri Location within the United States
- Location: Roughly Walnut and Main Sts., Chilhowee, Missouri
- Coordinates: 38.587778°N 93.855833°W
- Area: 4 acres (1.6 ha)
- Architect: Inman, Ed; Et al.
- Architectural style: Late Victorian
- NRHP reference No.: 88000650
- Added to NRHP: June 2, 1988

Chilhowee Historic District is a national historic district located at Chilhowee, Johnson County, Missouri. The district encompasses 21 contributing buildings in the central business district of Chilhowee. It developed between about 1904 and 1930 and includes representative examples of Late Victorian style architecture. Notable contributing buildings include the Farmers Bank (1907), Murphy Bros. Hardware (1907), Valentine & Son's General Store (1906), Farmers Produce Exchange (1907), Chilhowee Senior Citizens Building (c. 1905), Chilhowee Bank (1915), and City garage (c. 1907).

It was listed on the National Register of Historic Places in 1988.
