= Robbins, Missouri =

Unincorporated community in Missouri, U.S.

Coordinates: 38°54′23″N 93°48′29″W

Robbins is an unincorporated community in Johnson County, in the U.S. state of Missouri.

== History ==
A variant spelling was "Robins". A post office called Robins was established in 1892, and remained in operation until 1904. The community has the name of Henry Clay Robbins, an early settler.
