= Garden of Eden Station =

- U.S. National Register of Historic Places
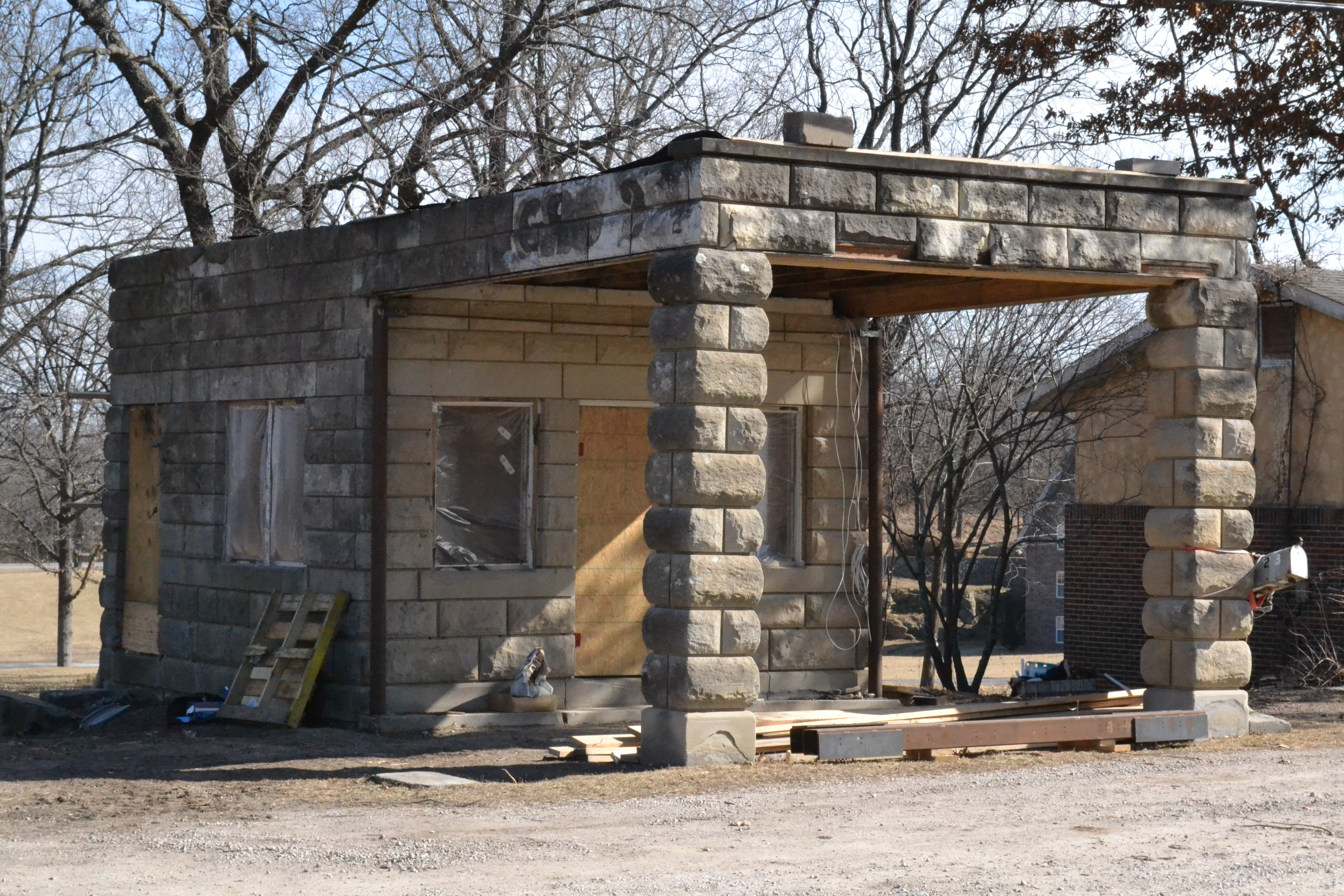

- Location within Missouri Location within the United States
- Location: Junction of MO 13 and County Road 215NW, near Warrensburg, Missouri
- Coordinates: 38°47′29″N 93°44′31″W
- Area: less than one acre
- Built: c. 1928
- Built by: Pickel, Bernard (Ben)
- NRHP reference No.: 94000313
- Added to NRHP: April 8, 1994

Garden of Eden Station, also known as Pickel's Station and McBride's Station, is a historic gas station located near Warrensburg, Johnson County, Missouri. It was built about 1928, and is a small, relatively unaltered rural gas station constructed of coursed sandstone blocks.

It was listed on the National Register of Historic Places in 1995.
