= Henrietta, Johnson County, Missouri =

Unincorporated community in Missouri, U.S.

Coordinates: 38°36′09″N 93°37′08″W

Henrietta is an unincorporated community in Johnson County, in the U.S. state of Missouri.

== History ==
A post office called Henrietta was established in 1877, and remained in operation until 1904. The community took its name from a local Grange hall of the same name.
