= Magnolia Mills =

- U.S. National Register of Historic Places
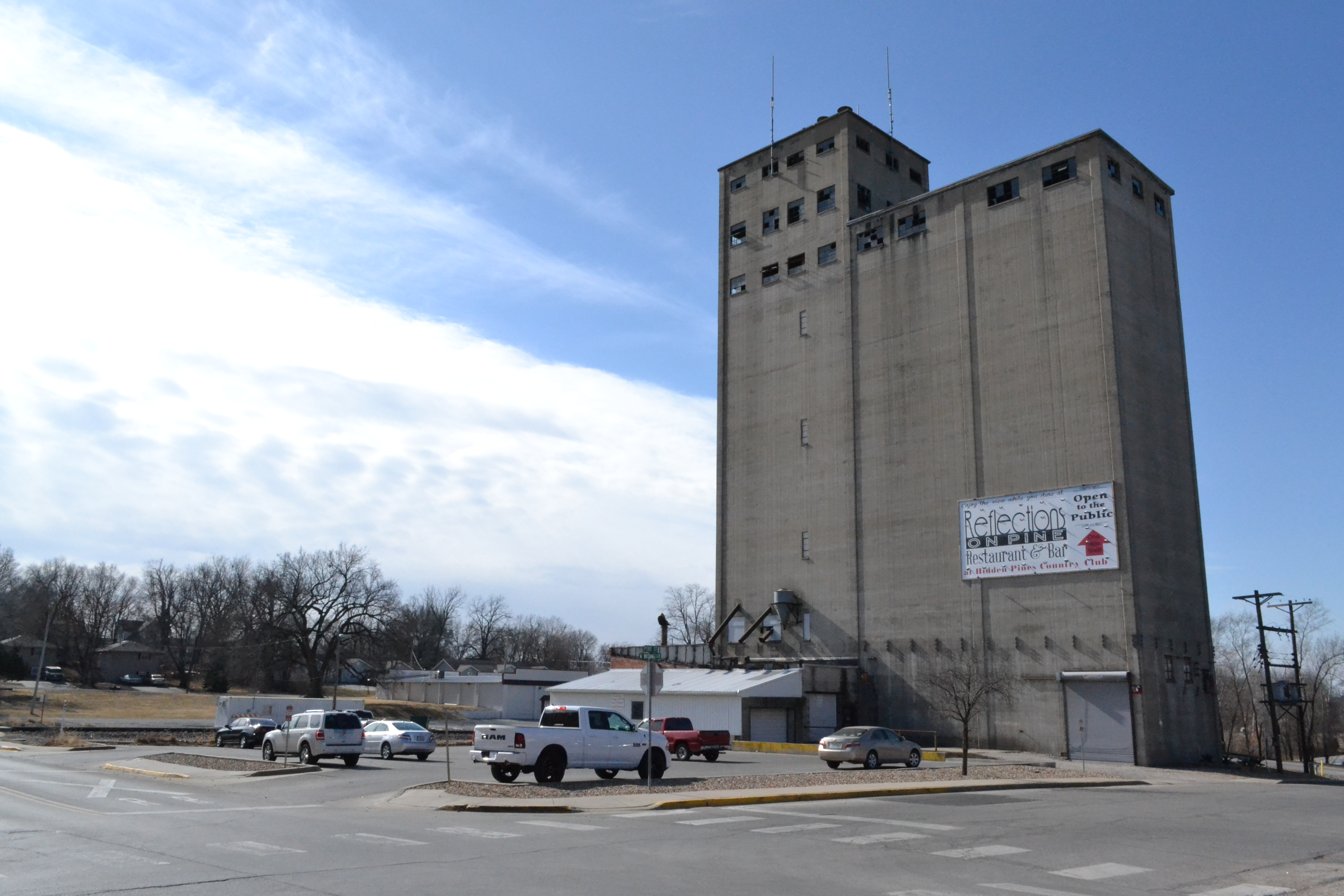

- Location within Missouri Location within the United States
- Location: 200 W. Pine St., Warrensburg, Missouri
- Coordinates: 38°45′47″N 93°44′35″W
- Area: less than one acre
- Built: 1879, 1884, 1888, 1918
- NRHP reference No.: 96001064
- Added to NRHP: October 3, 1996

Magnolia Mills, also known as Innes Elevator Mills, was a historic grist mill complex located at Warrensburg, Johnson County, Missouri. The original building was built in 1879, and enlarged in 1884, 1888, and 1918. It consisted of a four-story, frame mill building with a three-story frame elevator topped with a monitor roof and large cupola. A modern concrete elevator and mill were added in the late-1940s. Only the concrete elevator remains of the original buildings.

It was listed on the National Register of Historic Places in 1996.
