= Leeton, Missouri =

- City
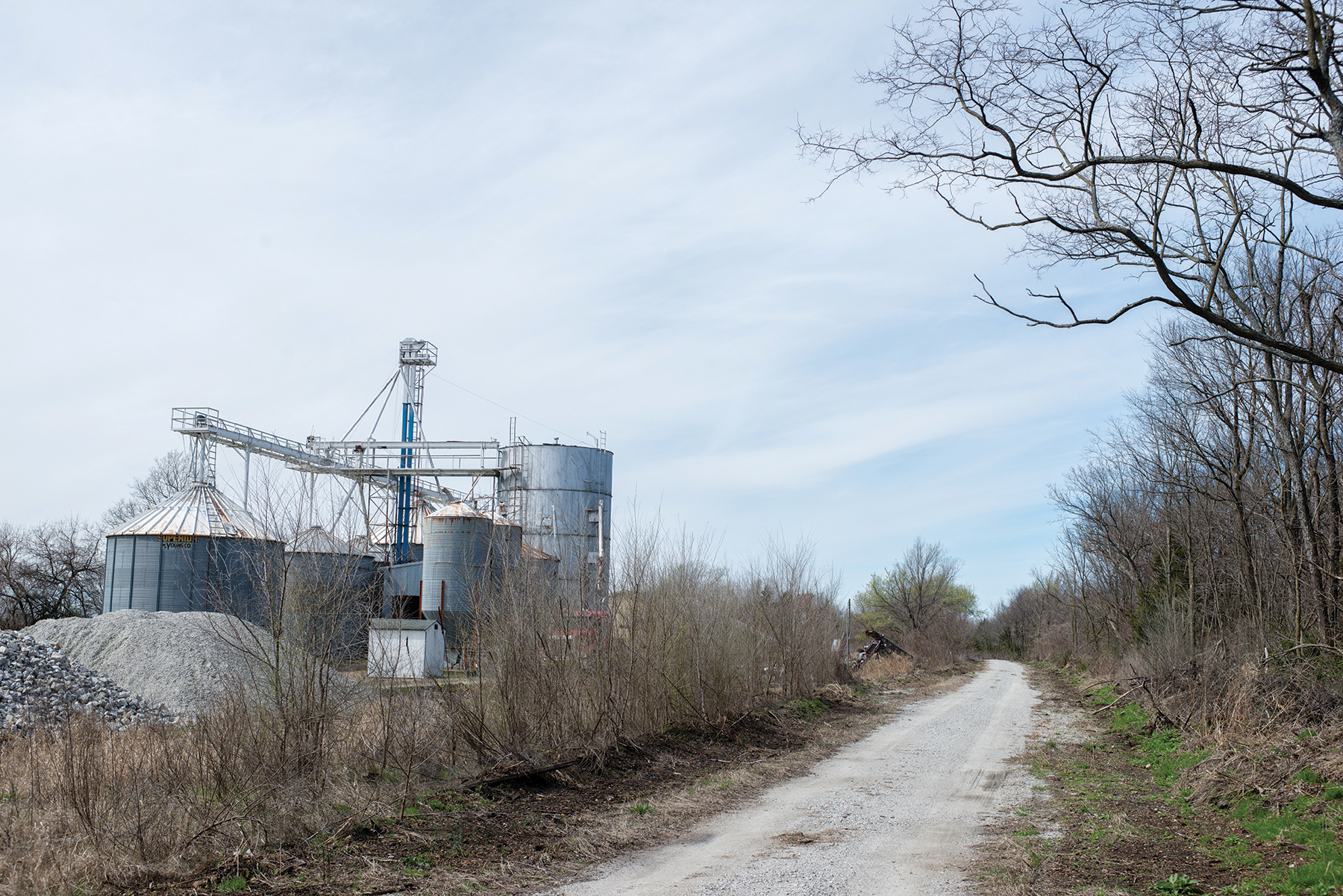
- Rock Island Trail State Park at Leeton

- Location of Leeton, Missouri
- Coordinates: 38°35′00″N 93°41′43″W
- Country: United States
- State: Missouri
- County: Johnson

Area
  - Total: 0.52 sq mi (1.34 km^{2})
  - Land: 0.52 sq mi (1.34 km^{2})
  - Water: 0 sq mi (0.00 km^{2})
- Elevation: 948 ft (289 m)

Population (2020)
  - Total: 532
  - Density: 1,030.5/sq mi (397.89/km^{2})
- Time zone: UTC-6 (Central (CST))
  - Summer (DST): UTC-5 (CDT)
- ZIP code: 64761
- Area code: 660
- FIPS code: 29-41402
- GNIS feature ID: 2395670

Leeton is a city in southeast Johnson County, Missouri, United States. As of the 2020 census, Leeton had a population of 532.

== History ==
Leeton was platted in 1895, and named after J. J. Lee, the original owner of the town site. A post office called Leeton has been in operation since 1882.

== Geography ==
Leeton is located at 38°35′1″N 93°41′43″W (38.583655, -93.695270).

According to the United States Census Bureau, the city has a total area of 0.51 square miles (1.32 km^{2}), all land.

== Demographics ==
Historical population
Census	Pop.	Note	%±
1910	420		—
1920	463		10.2%
1930	416		−10.2%
1940	436		4.8%
1950	372		−14.7%
1960	371		−0.3%
1970	425		14.6%
1980	604		42.1%
1990	632		4.6%
2000	619		−2.1%
2010	566		−8.6%
2020	532		−6.0%
U.S. Decennial Census

=== 2010 census ===
As of the census of 2010, there were 566 people, 232 households, and 151 families living in the city. The population density was 1,109.8 inhabitants per square mile (428.5/km^{2}). There were 283 housing units at an average density of 554.9 per square mile (214.2/km^{2}). The racial makeup of the city was 96.5% White, 0.4% African American, 1.2% Native American, 0.4% Asian, and 1.6% from two or more races. Hispanic or Latino of any race were 1.1% of the population.

There were 232 households, of which 37.1% had children under the age of 18 living with them, 46.6% were married couples living together, 11.2% had a female householder with no husband present, 7.3% had a male householder with no wife present, and 34.9% were non-families. 30.2% of all households were made up of individuals, and 9.9% had someone living alone who was 65 years of age or older. The average household size was 2.44 and the average family size was 3.01.

The median age in the city was 38.4 years. 24.9% of residents were under the age of 18; 9.2% were between the ages of 18 and 24; 23.7% were from 25 to 44; 30.5% were from 45 to 64; and 11.8% were 65 years of age or older. The gender makeup of the city was 54.1% male and 45.9% female.

=== 2000 census ===
As of the census of 2000, there were 619 people, 239 households, and 164 families living in the city. The population density was 1,220.2 inhabitants per square mile (471.1/km^{2}). There were 277 housing units at an average density of 546.0 per square mile (210.8/km^{2}). The racial makeup of the city was 97.74% White, 0.16% African American, 0.16% Native American, 0.16% Asian, 1.29% from other races, and 0.48% from two or more races. Hispanic or Latino of any race were 1.62% of the population.

There were 239 households, out of which 35.6% had children under the age of 18 living with them, 49.8% were married couples living together, 15.1% had a female householder with no husband present, and 31.0% were non-families. 23.8% of all households were made up of individuals, and 13.4% had someone living alone who was 65 years of age or older. The average household size was 2.59 and the average family size was 3.04.

In the city the population was spread out, with 30.4% under the age of 18, 7.6% from 18 to 24, 27.6% from 25 to 44, 22.0% from 45 to 64, and 12.4% who were 65 years of age or older. The median age was 35 years. For every 100 females there were 90.5 males. For every 100 females age 18 and over, there were 83.4 males.

The median income for a household in the city was $29,063, and the median income for a family was $31,000. Males had a median income of $29,750 versus $18,750 for females. The per capita income for the city was $313,207. About 14.3% of families and 14.4% of the population were below the poverty line, including 20.0% of those under age 18 and 4.5% of those age 65 or over.

== Points of interest ==
- Rock Island Spur Trailhead

== Education ==
Leeton R-X School District operates one elementary school, one middle school, and Leeton High School.

Leeton has a public library, a branch of the Trails Regional Library.
