= Post Oak Creek =

Stream in the American state of Missouri

Post Oak Creek is a stream in Johnson County in the U.S. state of Missouri.

The stream headwaters arise just west of Warrensburg at the confluence of the East and West Forks at 38°46′08″N 93°45′54″W. It flows north passing under U.S. Route 50. One mile north of Route 50 the stream veers to the northeast passing under Missouri Route 13 and enters the Blackwater River two miles north of Warrensburg at 38°48′26″N 93°44′30″W.

Post Oak Creek was named for the post oak trees near its course.

== See also ==
- List of rivers of Missouri
