= Fayetteville, Missouri =

Unincorporated community in Missouri, U.S.

Coordinates: 38°52′52″N 93°45′23″W

Fayetteville is an unincorporated community in Johnson County, in the U.S. state of Missouri.

== History ==
Fayetteville was founded in the mid-1840s, and named after Lafayette Collins, a local storekeeper. A post office called Fayetteville was established in 1856, and remained in operation until 1919.
