= West Line, Missouri =

- Village
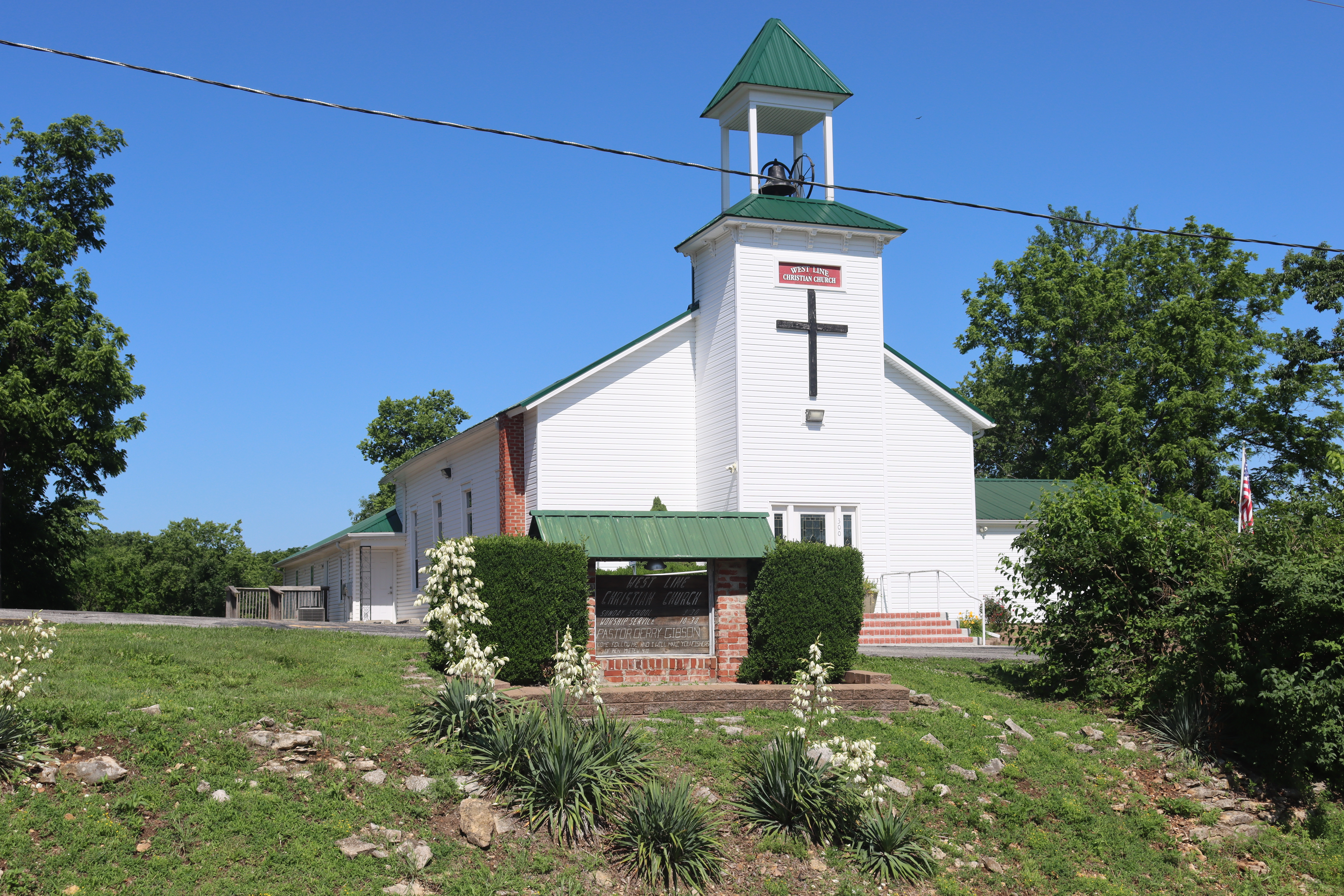
- West Line Christian Church

- Location of West Line, Missouri
- Coordinates: 38°38′09″N 94°35′13″W
- Country: United States
- State: Missouri
- County: Cass

Area
  - Total: 0.46 sq mi (1.18 km^{2})
  - Land: 0.46 sq mi (1.18 km^{2})
  - Water: 0 sq mi (0.00 km^{2})
- Elevation: 902 ft (275 m)

Population (2020)
  - Total: 117
  - Density: 257.9/sq mi (99.56/km^{2})
- Time zone: UTC-6 (Central (CST))
  - Summer (DST): UTC-5 (CDT)
- ZIP code: 64734
- Area code: 816
- FIPS code: 29-78838
- GNIS feature ID: 2400136
- Website: westlinemo.org

West Line is a village in Cass County, Missouri. The population was 117 at the 2020 census. It is part of the Kansas City metropolitan area.

== History ==
West Line was originally called State Line, and under the latter name was platted in 1870. The village was named from its position near the west boundary of the county and state. A post office called State Line was established in 1871, the name was changed to West Line in 1875, and the post office closed in 1973.

== Geography ==
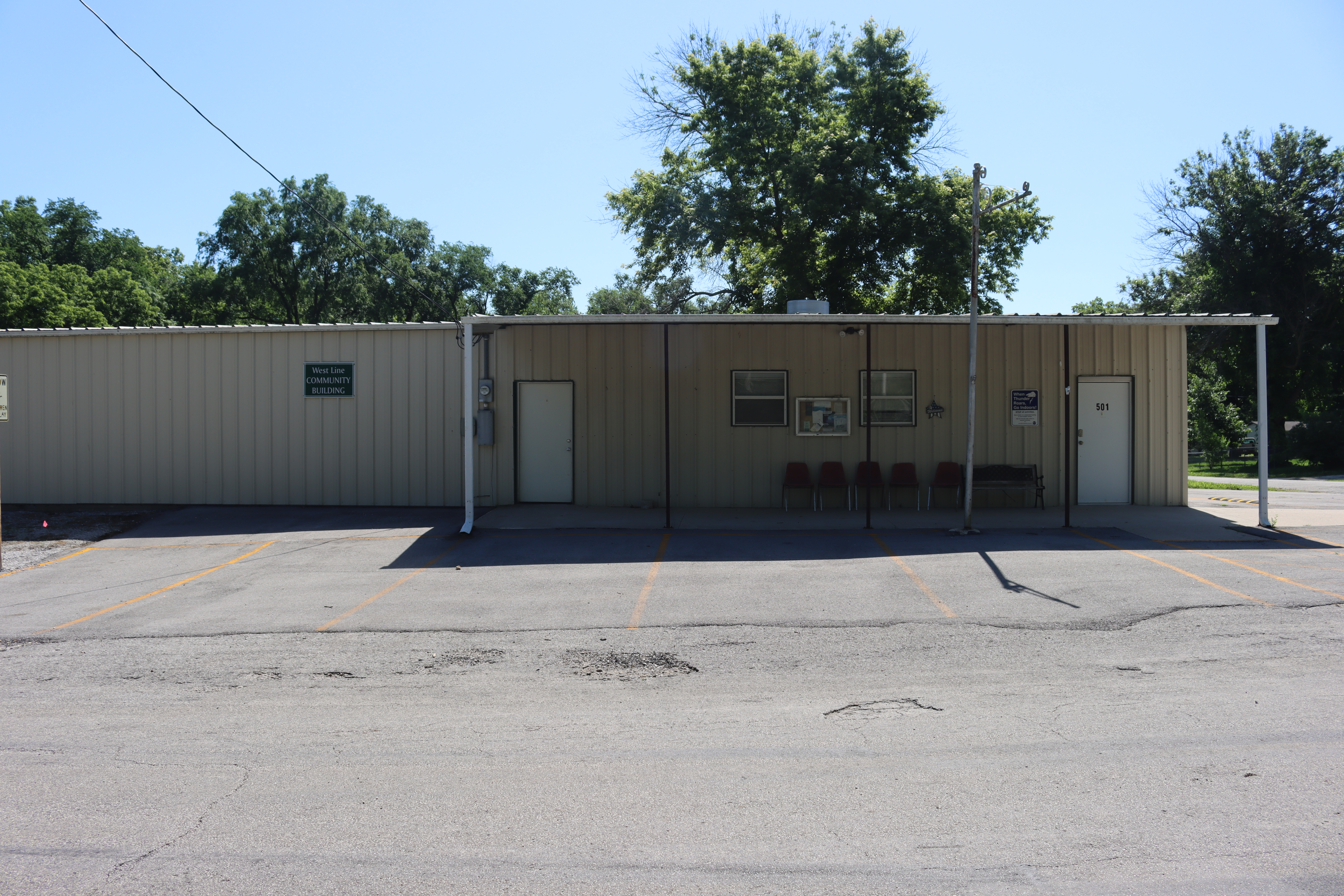
The West Line Community Building

According to the United States Census Bureau, the village has a total area of 0.45 square miles (1.17 km^{2}), all land.

== Demographics ==
Historical population
Census	Pop.	Note	%±
1880	134		—
1890	178		32.8%
1900	131		−26.4%
1910	129		−1.5%
1920	135		4.7%
1930	106		−21.5%
1940	111		4.7%
1950	68		−38.7%
1960	88		29.4%
1970	114		29.5%
1980	109		−4.4%
1990	98		−10.1%
2000	95		−3.1%
2010	97		2.1%
2020	117		20.6%
U.S. Decennial Census

=== Racial and ethnic composition ===
West Line village, Missouri – Racial and ethnic composition Note: the US Census treats Hispanic/Latino as an ethnic category. This table excludes Latinos from the racial categories and assigns them to a separate category. Hispanics/Latinos may be of any race.
Race / Ethnicity (NH = Non-Hispanic)	Pop 2000	Pop 2010	Pop 2020	% 2000	% 2010	% 2020
White alone (NH)	95	94	106	100.00%	96.91%	90.60%
Black or African American alone (NH)	0	0	0	0.00%	0.00%	0.00%
Native American or Alaska Native alone (NH)	0	0	0	0.00%	0.00%	0.00%
Asian alone (NH)	0	0	1	0.00%	0.00%	0.85%
Native Hawaiian or Pacific Islander alone (NH)	0	0	0	0.00%	0.00%	0.00%
Other race alone (NH)	0	0	2	0.00%	0.00%	1.71%
Mixed race or Multiracial (NH)	0	1	7	0.00%	1.03%	5.98%
Hispanic or Latino (any race)	0	2	1	0.00%	2.06%	0.85%
Total	95	97	117	100.00%	100.00%	100.00%

=== 2010 census ===
As of the census of 2010, there were 97 people, 37 households, and 28 families living in the village. The population density was 215.6 inhabitants per square mile (83.2/km^{2}). There were 39 housing units at an average density of 86.7 per square mile (33.5/km^{2}). The racial makeup of the village was 99.0% White and 1.0% from two or more races. Hispanic or Latino of any race were 2.1% of the population.

There were 37 households, of which 43.2% had children under the age of 18 living with them, 54.1% were married couples living together, 10.8% had a female householder with no husband present, 10.8% had a male householder with no wife present, and 24.3% were non-families. 18.9% of all households were made up of individuals, and 8.1% had someone living alone who was 65 years of age or older. The average household size was 2.62 and the average family size was 3.00.

The median age in the village was 43.3 years. 26.8% of residents were under the age of 18; 5.2% were between the ages of 18 and 24; 20.7% were from 25 to 44; 38.1% were from 45 to 64; and 9.3% were 65 years of age or older. The gender makeup of the village was 51.5% male and 48.5% female.

=== 2000 census ===
As of the census of 2000, there were 95 people, 35 households, and 28 families living in the village. The population density was 768.0 inhabitants per square mile (296.5/km^{2}). There were 37 housing units at an average density of 299.1 per square mile (115.5/km^{2}). The racial makeup of the village was 100.00% White.

There were 35 households, out of which 20.0% had children under the age of 18 living with them, 60.0% were married couples living together, 8.6% had a female householder with no husband present, and 20.0% were non-families. 20.0% of all households were made up of individuals, and 8.6% had someone living alone who was 65 years of age or older. The average household size was 2.71 and the average family size was 3.00.

In the village, the population was spread out, with 22.1% under the age of 18, 9.5% from 18 to 24, 33.7% from 25 to 44, 18.9% from 45 to 64, and 15.8% who were 65 years of age or older. The median age was 34 years. For every 100 females, there were 115.9 males. For every 100 females age 18 and over, there were 117.6 males.

The median income for a household in the village was $46,250, and the median income for a family was $50,833. Males had a median income of $33,750 versus $20,625 for females. The per capita income for the village was $24,831. There were no families and 6.3% of the population living below the poverty line, including no under eighteens and none of those over 64.

== Education ==
It is in the Midway R-I School District.

Metropolitan Community College has the Midway school district area in its service area, but not its in-district taxation area.
