= Bowen, Missouri =

Unincorporated community in Missouri, U.S.

Coordinates: 38°33′29″N 93°35′28″W

Bowen is an unincorporated community in Henry and Johnson counties, in the U.S. state of Missouri.

The community sits on the Henry-Johnson county line along the St. Louis Southwestern Railway. Windsor lies four miles to the southeast. Missouri Route 23 passes through the community and on to Whiteman Air Force Base ten miles to the north. The Middle Fork of Tebo Creek flows past to the west.

== History ==
Bowen was laid out in the early 1900s, and named after the local Bowen Coal Company. A post office called Bowen was established in 1907, and remained in operation until 1923.
