= Post Oak, Missouri =

Unincorporated community in the U.S. state of Missouri

Coordinates: 38°34′08″N 93°45′04″W

Post Oak is an unincorporated community in Johnson County, in the U.S. state of Missouri.

The community is located on Missouri Route 13. The Rock Island Trail runs just north of the community.

== History ==
Post Oak was laid out in the 1850s, and named after nearby Post Oak Creek. The Post Oak post office remained in operation until it was discontinued in 1954.
