= Columbus, Missouri =

Unincorporated community in Missouri, U.S.

Coordinates: 38°51′31″N 93°53′27″W

Columbus is an unincorporated community in Johnson County, in the U.S. state of Missouri.

The community is on Missouri Route M approximately 7 miles north of US Route 50. Warrensburg is 20 miles to the southeast. The North Fork of the Blackwater River flows past two miles to the southwest.

== History ==
The county seat was once located at Columbus. The town site was platted in 1836. A post office called Columbus was in operation from 1837 until 1920. The community was named for Christopher Columbus.
