= Henry County R-1 School District =

School district in Missouri, U.S.

Address
- 210 North Street Windsor, Missouri, 65360; United States

District information
- Type: Public
- Grades: PreK–12
- NCES District ID: 2932110

Students and staff
- Students: 681
- Teachers: 56.26
- Staff: 30.8
- Student–teacher ratio: 12.1

Other information
- Website: henrycountyr1.k12.mo.us

Henry County R-I School District is a school district headquartered in Windsor, Missouri.

== Schools ==
- Windsor Jr.-Sr. High School
- Windsor Elementary School
