= Bowmansville, Missouri =

Unincorporated community in Missouri, U.S.

Coordinates: 38°42′33″N 93°44′02″W

Bowmansville was an unincorporated community in Johnson County, in the U.S. state of Missouri.

Bowmansville was located on S Division off Missouri Route 13 approximately three miles south of Warrensburg. Fletcher Creek flows past about one-half mile to the south.

== History ==
The community was first settled by a German Baptist congregation in 1880, including a deacon named John Bowman.

J. B. Bowman was a local merchant who insisted that his group of businesses be called "Bowmansville". In 1916, he attempted to get Bowmansville to appear on maps; at that time it consisted of a store, a blacksmith and wagon shop, and a single residence. Mr. Bowman ran the store, blacksmith shop, and a mill in 1927. A local 1929 report on area businesses listed Bowmansville as having a single merchant.

In 1918, the History of Johnson County Missouri said "the store and the shop constitute Bowmansville's principal and only business establishments and there is probably not another town in Missouri where all the citizens are congenial members of one family, all cooperating as harmoniously as do the citizens of this little town." The book also notes the residents of Johnson County call the "little town" Bowmansville.
