= Montserrat, Missouri =

Unincorporated community in Missouri, U.S.

Coordinates: 38°46′29″N 93°37′19″W

Location of Montserrat within the state of Missouri.

Montserrat is an unincorporated community in Johnson County, in the U.S. state of Missouri.

== History ==
An old variant name was "Carbon Hill". Montserrat was originally called Carbon Hill, and under the latter name was platted in 1867. The town was moved and town site replatted in 1870 when the railroad was extended to that point. A post office called Montserrat was established in 1872, and remained in operation until 1954.

== Demographics ==
Historical population
Census	Pop.	Note	%±
1900	184		—
1910	157		−14.7%
Missouri Census Data Center
