= Centerview, Missouri =

- Village
- Location of Centerview, Missouri
- Coordinates: 38°44′52″N 93°50′38″W
- Country: United States
- State: Missouri
- County: Johnson

Area
  - Total: 0.20 sq mi (0.51 km^{2})
  - Land: 0.20 sq mi (0.51 km^{2})
  - Water: 0 sq mi (0.00 km^{2})
- Elevation: 853 ft (260 m)

Population (2020)
  - Total: 189
  - Density: 966/sq mi (373.1/km^{2})
- Time zone: UTC-6 (Central (CST))
  - Summer (DST): UTC-5 (CDT)
- ZIP code: 64019
- Area code: 660
- FIPS code: 29-12682
- GNIS feature ID: 2393782

Centerview is a village in Johnson County, Missouri, United States. The population was 267 at the 2010 census.

== History ==
Centerview was originally called Graham, and under the latter name was laid out in 1865, and named after Samuel C. Graham, the original owner of the town site. A post office called Centerview has been in operation since 1868.

== Geography ==
According to the United States Census Bureau, the town has a total area of 0.12 square miles (0.31 km^{2}), all land.

Centerview lies on Route 58, about seven miles west of the city of Warrensburg.

== Demographics ==
Historical population
| Census | Pop. | Note | %± |
|---|---|---|---|
| 1880 | 227 | | — |
| 1920 | 268 | | — |
| 1930 | 175 | | −34.7% |
| 1940 | 198 | | 13.1% |
| 1950 | 179 | | −9.6% |
| 1960 | 208 | | 16.2% |
| 1970 | 234 | | 12.5% |
| 1980 | 223 | | −4.7% |
| 1990 | 214 | | −4.0% |
| 2000 | 249 | | 16.4% |
| 2010 | 267 | | 7.2% |
| 2020 | 189 | | −29.2% |
U.S. Decennial Census

=== 2010 census ===
As of the census of 2010, there were 267 people, 94 households, and 65 families living in the town. The population density was 2,225.0 inhabitants per square mile (859.1/km^{2}). There were 114 housing units at an average density of 950.0 per square mile (366.8/km^{2}). The racial makeup of the town was 94.4% White, 0.4% African American, 0.4% Native American, 1.9% Asian, 1.5% from other races, and 1.5% from two or more races. Hispanic or Latino of any race were 3.7% of the population.

There were 94 households, of which 48.9% had children under the age of 18 living with them, 35.1% were married couples living together, 23.4% had a female householder with no husband present, 10.6% had a male householder with no wife present, and 30.9% were non-families. 21.3% of all households were made up of individuals, and 5.4% had someone living alone who was 65 years of age or older. The average household size was 2.84 and the average family size was 3.29.

The median age in the town was 29.4 years. 36.7% of residents were under the age of 18; 7.9% were between the ages of 18 and 24; 30.3% were from 25 to 44; 18.7% were from 45 to 64; and 6.4% were 65 years of age or older. The gender makeup of the town was 43.8% male and 56.2% female.

=== 2000 census ===
As of the census of 2000, there were 249 people, 89 households, and 67 families living in the town. The population density was 2,148.1 inhabitants per square mile (829.4/km^{2}). There were 107 housing units at an average density of 923.1 per square mile (356.4/km^{2}). The racial makeup of the town was 92.37% White, 3.21% Native American, 0.40% Asian, 0.80% from other races, and 3.21% from two or more races. Hispanic or Latino of any race were 4.42% of the population.

There were 89 households, out of which 41.6% had children under the age of 18 living with them, 47.2% were married couples living together, 24.7% had a female householder with no husband present, and 23.6% were non-families. 19.1% of all households were made up of individuals, and 7.9% had someone living alone who was 65 years of age or older. The average household size was 2.80 and the average family size was 3.15.

In the town the population was spread out, with 34.5% under the age of 18, 8.8% from 18 to 24, 30.9% from 25 to 44, 17.3% from 45 to 64, and 8.4% who were 65 years of age or older. The median age was 30 years. For every 100 females there were 79.1 males. For every 100 females age 18 and over, there were 79.1 males.

The median income for a household in the town was $28,333, and the median income for a family was $31,250. Males had a median income of $32,500 versus $16,042 for females. The per capita income for the town was $12,696. About 28.9% of families and 28.6% of the population were below the poverty line, including 41.7% of those under the age of eighteen and 16.7% of those 65 or over.
