= Rose Hill, Missouri =

Unincorporated community in Missouri, U.S.

Coordinates: 38°37′58″N 94°04′09″W

Rose Hill is an unincorporated community in Johnson County, in the U.S. state of Missouri.

== History ==
Rose Hill was platted in 1842, and named for the wild roses near the elevated town site. A post office called Rose Hill was established in 1866, and remained in operation until 1885. A variant name was "Big Creek".
