= Big Creek (South Grand River tributary) =

Stream in the US state of Missouri

Big Creek is a stream in Jackson, Cass, Johnson and Henry counties of western Missouri. It is a tributary of the South Grand River.

The stream headwaters are in Jackson County at 38°52′55″N 94°23′29″W and its confluence with the South Grand River is in Henry County at 38°23′20″N 93°53′28″W.

Big Creek was named for its large size relative to other nearby creeks.

== See also ==
- List of rivers of Missouri
