= Medford, Missouri =

Unincorporated community in the U.S. state of Missouri

Coordinates: 38°39′06″N 94°00′26″W

Medford is an unincorporated community in southern Johnson County in the U.S. state of Missouri.

The community is located on Missouri Route 131 and the Chicago, Rock Island and Pacific Railroad. Scaly Bark Creek flows past the west side of the community where it has been impounded adjacent to the railroad line to form Rock Island Lake. Holden is 4 miles (6.4 km) north along Route 131.

== History ==
Medford was laid out in 1905 and named after a railroad employee. A post office called Medford was established in 1905 and remained in operation until 1937. The post office was briefly named Olive Hill.

== Points of interest ==
- Rock Island Spur Trailhead
