= Knob Noster, Missouri =

- City
- City of Knob Noster
- Location of Knob Noster, Missouri
- Coordinates: 38°45′50″N 93°33′40″W
- Country: United States
- State: Missouri
- County: Johnson

Area
  - Total: 2.91 sq mi (7.53 km^{2})
  - Land: 2.88 sq mi (7.46 km^{2})
  - Water: 0.023 sq mi (0.06 km^{2})
- Elevation: 748 ft (228 m)

Population (2020)
  - Total: 2,782
  - Density: 965.6/sq mi (372.81/km^{2})
- Time zone: UTC-6 (Central (CST))
  - Summer (DST): UTC-5 (CDT)
- ZIP codes: 65336
- Area code: 660
- FIPS code: 29-39188
- GNIS feature ID: 2395555
- Website: cityofkn.net

Knob Noster /ˈnɒb ˈnɒstər/ is a city in Johnson County, Missouri, United States. The population was 2,782 at the 2020 census. It is located adjacent to and closely associated with Whiteman Air Force Base. Knob Noster State Park is nearby.

== History ==
Knob Noster was platted in 1856. The community, in the eastern part of Washington Township, was laid out in 1856 by William A. Wortham, and incorporated by act of legislature December 14, 1859. All authorities agree that the name is connected with the prominent mound or knob (or knobs) that stand isolated on the prairie near the town. The second part of the name is said to have been suggested by a school teacher, but its origin is uncertain. Surveyor and educator David Wolfe Eaton derived it from the Latin, interpreting the whole name as "Our Knobs". The town was removed to its present site when the Pacific Railroad was built. A post office has been in operation in Knob Noster since 1846.

== Geography ==
Knob Noster is located along U.S. Route 50 approximately nine miles east of Warrensburg. Knob Noster State Park lies to the southwest along Missouri Route 23 and Whiteman Air Force Base lies directly south about one mile.

According to the United States Census Bureau, the city has a total area of 2.91 square miles (7.54 km^{2}), of which 2.88 square miles (7.46 km^{2}) is land and 0.03 square miles (0.08 km^{2}) is water.

== Demographics ==
Historical population
| Census | Pop. | Note | %± |
|---|---|---|---|
| 1870 | 914 | | — |
| 1880 | 689 | | −24.6% |
| 1890 | 851 | | 23.5% |
| 1900 | 673 | | −20.9% |
| 1910 | 670 | | −0.4% |
| 1920 | 617 | | −7.9% |
| 1930 | 683 | | 10.7% |
| 1940 | 640 | | −6.3% |
| 1950 | 585 | | −8.6% |
| 1960 | 2,292 | | 291.8% |
| 1970 | 2,264 | | −1.2% |
| 1980 | 2,040 | | −9.9% |
| 1990 | 2,261 | | 10.8% |
| 2000 | 2,462 | | 8.9% |
| 2010 | 2,709 | | 10.0% |
| 2020 | 2,782 | | 2.7% |
U.S. Decennial Census

=== 2020 census ===
As of the 2020 census, Knob Noster had a population of 2,782. The median age was 28.2 years. 24.3% of residents were under the age of 18 and 9.1% of residents were 65 years of age or older. For every 100 females there were 116.0 males, and for every 100 females age 18 and over there were 115.1 males age 18 and over.

87.6% of residents lived in urban areas, while 12.4% lived in rural areas.

There were 1,197 households in Knob Noster, of which 31.2% had children under the age of 18 living in them. Of all households, 39.9% were married-couple households, 28.9% were households with a male householder and no spouse or partner present, and 23.0% were households with a female householder and no spouse or partner present. About 34.3% of all households were made up of individuals and 7.0% had someone living alone who was 65 years of age or older.

There were 1,332 housing units, of which 10.1% were vacant. The homeowner vacancy rate was 4.3% and the rental vacancy rate was 6.8%.

Racial composition as of the 2020 census
| Race | Number | Percent |
|---|---|---|
| White | 2,065 | 74.2% |
| Black or African American | 229 | 8.2% |
| American Indian and Alaska Native | 21 | 0.8% |
| Asian | 75 | 2.7% |
| Native Hawaiian and Other Pacific Islander | 27 | 1.0% |
| Some other race | 87 | 3.1% |
| Two or more races | 278 | 10.0% |
| Hispanic or Latino (of any race) | 250 | 9.0% |

=== 2010 census ===
As of the census of 2010, there were 2,709 people, 1,147 households, and 675 families living in the city. The population density was 940.6 inhabitants per square mile (363.2/km^{2}). There were 1,347 housing units at an average density of 467.7 per square mile (180.6/km^{2}). The racial makeup of the city was 80.0% White, 9.1% African American, 0.6% Native American, 3.1% Asian, 0.7% Pacific Islander, 2.2% from other races, and 4.2% from two or more races. Hispanic or Latino of any race were 6.8% of the population.

There were 1,147 households, of which 33.8% had children under the age of 18 living with them, 41.5% were married couples living together, 12.6% had a female householder with no husband present, 4.8% had a male householder with no wife present, and 41.2% were non-families. 31.7% of all households were made up of individuals, and 6.5% had someone living alone who was 65 years of age or older. The average household size was 2.36 and the average family size was 3.03.

The median age in the city was 27.1 years. 25.4% of residents were under the age of 18; 18.4% were between the ages of 18 and 24; 28.3% were from 25 to 44; 20.1% were from 45 to 64; and 7.9% were 65 years of age or older. The gender makeup of the city was 51.6% male and 48.4% female.

=== 2000 census ===
As of the census of 2000, there were 2,462 people, 959 households, and 602 families living in the city. The population density was 1,421.8 inhabitants per square mile (549.0/km^{2}). There were 1,092 housing units at an average density of 630.6 per square mile (243.5/km^{2}). The racial makeup of the city was 71.61% White, 11.86% African American, 0.93% Native American, 1.83% Asian, 0.49% Pacific Islander, 10.32% from other races, and 2.97% from two or more races. Hispanic of any race were 15.07% of the population.

There were 959 households, out of which 33.6% had children under the age of 18 living with them, 44.9% were married couples living together, 13.2% had a female householder with no husband present, and 37.2% were non-families. 28.6% of all households were made up of individuals, and 6.5% had someone living alone who was 65 years of age or older. The average household size was 2.57 and the average family size was 3.14.

In the city, the population was spread out, with 27.6% under the age of 18, 19.3% from 18 to 24, 29.7% from 25 to 44, 16.8% from 45 to 64, and 6.7% who were 65 years of age or older. The median age was 27 years. For every 100 females, there were 110.8 males. For every 100 females age 18 and over, there were 110.5 males.

The median income for a household in the city was $30,869, and the median income for a family was $36,842. Males had a median income of $22,176 versus $19,327 for females. The per capita income for the city was $15,702. About 13.4% of families and 17.0% of the population were below the poverty line, including 28.4% of those under age 18 and 2.0% of those age 65 or over.

== Education ==
Knob Noster R-VIII School District operates two elementary schools, one middle school, and Knob Noster High School. Knob Noster has a public library, the Knob Noster Branch of Trails Regional Library. It's located in downtown Knob Noster and offers public access to books, digital media, and internet services. The branch hosts regular programs for children, teens, and adults, including weekly story times, craft activities, STEAM/STEM events, and book discussions.

== In popular culture ==
Knob Noster was mentioned in the 1983 American television movie The Day After.

== Community ==
The Knob Noster Chamber of Commerce sponsors several local events throughout the year. Including city-wide yard/garage sale, trunk or treat, Christmas tree lighting, spring and fall wine strolls, and networking events and service days. Since at least 2020, the Knob Noster Open Air Market has taken place on the third Saturday of each month from May through October in downtown Knob Noster. The event is located along McPherson and State Street. The market features local crafters and artisans, food vendors, nonprofit organizations, and live entertainment.
