= Windsor, Missouri =

City in Henry and Pettis counties in Missouri, United States

- City
- Location of Windsor, Missouri
- Coordinates: 38°31′55″N 93°31′22″W
- Country: United States
- State: Missouri
- Counties: Henry, Pettis

Area
  - Total: 2.45 sq mi (6.35 km^{2})
  - Land: 2.42 sq mi (6.26 km^{2})
  - Water: 0.031 sq mi (0.08 km^{2})
- Elevation: 912 ft (278 m)

Population (2020)
  - Total: 2,775
  - Density: 1,147.3/sq mi (442.96/km^{2})
- Time zone: UTC-6 (Central (CST))
  - Summer (DST): UTC-5 (CDT)
- ZIP code: 65360
- Area code: 660
- FIPS code: 29-80350
- GNIS feature ID: 2397342
- Website: www.cityofwindsormo.com

Windsor is a city in Henry and Pettis counties in Missouri, United States. As of the 2020 census, Windsor had a population of 2,775.

== History ==
Windsor was laid out in 1855, and originally known as Belmont. Its name was changed to Windsor in 1859, after Windsor Castle, in England. A post office called Windsor has been in operation since 1850.

== Geography ==
The city is located in northeast Henry County and extends to the northeast into the southwest corner of Pettis County. It is at the intersection of Missouri routes 52 and 2. Clinton is 16 miles to the southwest, Warrensburg is about 18 miles to the northwest and Sedalia is approximately 18 miles to the northeast. The east fork of Tebo Creek flows past the west side of the city.

According to the United States Census Bureau, the city has a total area of 2.45 square miles (6.35 km^{2}), of which 2.42 square miles (6.27 km^{2}) is land and 0.03 square miles (0.08 km^{2}) is water.

== Demographics ==
Historical population
Census	Pop.	Note	%±
1880	872		—
1890	1,427		63.6%
1900	1,502		5.3%
1910	2,241		49.2%
1920	2,034		−9.2%
1930	1,879		−7.6%
1940	2,373		26.3%
1950	2,429		2.4%
1960	2,714		11.7%
1970	2,778		2.4%
1980	3,058		10.1%
1990	3,044		−0.5%
2000	3,087		1.4%
2010	2,901		−6.0%
2020	2,775		−4.3%
U.S. Decennial Census

=== 2020 census ===
As of the 2020 census, Windsor had a population of 2,775. The median age was 37.9 years. 25.4% of residents were under the age of 18 and 17.9% of residents were 65 years of age or older. For every 100 females there were 92.7 males, and for every 100 females age 18 and over there were 88.4 males age 18 and over.

0.0% of residents lived in urban areas, while 100.0% lived in rural areas.

There were 1,107 households in Windsor, of which 32.2% had children under the age of 18 living in them. Of all households, 42.9% were married-couple households, 18.4% were households with a male householder and no spouse or partner present, and 30.7% were households with a female householder and no spouse or partner present. About 29.1% of all households were made up of individuals and 14.4% had someone living alone who was 65 years of age or older.

There were 1,328 housing units, of which 16.6% were vacant. The homeowner vacancy rate was 3.2% and the rental vacancy rate was 11.5%.

Racial composition as of the 2020 census
Race	Number	Percent
White	2,531	91.2%
Black or African American	6	0.2%
American Indian and Alaska Native	28	1.0%
Asian	7	0.3%
Native Hawaiian and Other Pacific Islander	0	0.0%
Some other race	25	0.9%
Two or more races	178	6.4%
Hispanic or Latino (of any race)	91	3.3%

=== 2010 census ===
As of the census of 2010, there were 2,901 people, 1,193 households, and 781 families living in the city. The population density was 1,198.8 inhabitants per square mile (462.9/km^{2}). There were 1,381 housing units at an average density of 570.7 per square mile (220.3/km^{2}). The racial makeup of the city was 96.8% White, 0.1% African American, 1.1% Native American, 0.2% Asian, 0.2% Pacific Islander, 0.1% from other races, and 1.4% from two or more races. Hispanic or Latino of any race were 2.0% of the population.

There were 1,193 households, of which 31.3% had children under the age of 18 living with them, 48.4% were married couples living together, 12.4% had a female householder with no husband present, 4.7% had a male householder with no wife present, and 34.5% were non-families. 29.6% of all households were made up of individuals, and 13.1% had someone living alone who was 65 years of age or older. The average household size was 2.39 and the average family size was 2.94.

The median age in the city was 38.2 years. 24.8% of residents were under the age of 18; 8.2% were between the ages of 18 and 24; 24.9% were from 25 to 44; 23.4% were from 45 to 64; and 18.8% were 65 years of age or older. The gender makeup of the city was 47.5% male and 52.5% female.

=== 2000 census ===
As of the census of 2000, there were 3,087 people, 1,280 households, and 848 families living in the city. The population density was 1,310.5 inhabitants per square mile (506.0/km^{2}). There were 1,418 housing units at an average density of 602.0 per square mile (232.4/km^{2}). The ethnical makeup of the city was 97.02% White, 0.52% African American, 0.65% Native American, 0.26% Asian, 0.36% from other races, and 1.20% from two or more ethnicities. Hispanic or Latino of any ethnicity were 0.52% of the population.

There were 1,280 households, out of which 30.7% had children under the age of 18 living with them, 52.0% were married couples living together, 10.5% had a female householder with no husband present, and 33.7% were non-families. 29.5% of all households were made up of individuals, and 16.2% had someone living alone who was 65 years of age or older. The average household size was 2.38 and the average family size was 2.91.

In the city, the population was spread out, with 25.3% under the age of 18, 8.4% from 18 to 24, 26.8% from 25 to 44, 20.1% from 45 to 64, and 19.5% who were 65 years of age or older. The median age was 38 years. For every 100 females, there were 88.5 males. For every 100 females age 18 and over, there were 84.4 males.

The median income for a household in the city was $29,922, and the median income for a family was $32,477. Males had a median income of $27,986 versus $19,605 for females. The per capita income for the city was $16,052. About 16.5% of families and 16.5% of the population were below the poverty line, including 18.0% of those under age 18 and 19.7% of those age 65 or over.

== Education ==
Windsor is within the Henry County R-1 School District, which operates an elementary school, and a junior and senior high school.

Windsor has a public library, a branch of the Henry County Library.

== Points of interest ==
Windsor is home to the point where the Rock Island Spur connects to the Katy Trail.

== Notable people ==
- Clarence Burton Vaudeville and film actor born near Windsor, Missouri
- Charles Stark Draper, American scientist and engineer, founder of the Charles Stark Draper Laboratory, born in Windsor
- Helen Duhamel (1904–1991), Rapid City, South Dakota, businesswoman and broadcaster, born in Windsor
- Winfred J. Sanborn, Los Angeles, California, City Council member, born in or near Windsor.

== See also ==
- List of cities in Missouri
