= Johnson County, Missouri =

County in Missouri, United States

- County
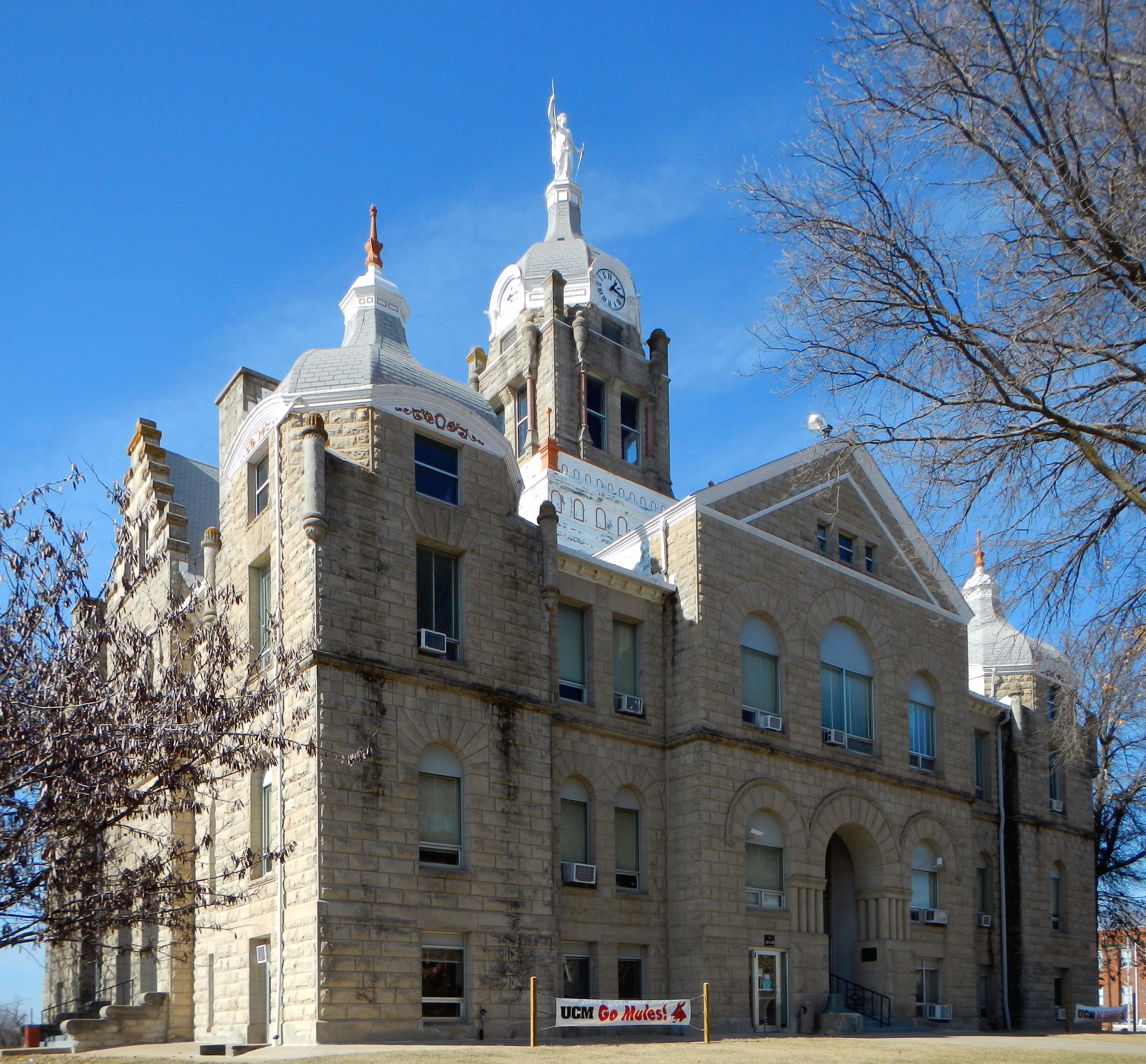
- Johnson County Courthouse in Warrensburg

- Location within the U.S. state of Missouri
- Coordinates: 38°45′N 93°49′W
- Country: United States
- State: Missouri
- Founded: December 13, 1833
- Named for: Richard Mentor Johnson
- Seat: Warrensburg
- Largest city: Warrensburg

Area
  - Total: 833 sq mi (2,160 km^{2})
  - Land: 829 sq mi (2,150 km^{2})
  - Water: 3.9 sq mi (10 km^{2}) 0.5%

Population (2020)
  - Total: 54,013
  - Estimate (2025): 56,670 ▲
  - Density: 68/sq mi (26/km^{2})
- Time zone: UTC−6 (Central)
  - Summer (DST): UTC−5 (CDT)
- Congressional district: 4th
- Website: www.jocomo.gov

Johnson County is a county located in western portion of the U.S. state of Missouri. As of the 2020 census, the population was 54,013. Its county seat is Warrensburg. The county was formed December 13, 1834, from Lafayette County and named for Vice President Richard Mentor Johnson.

Johnson County comprises the Warrensburg Micropolitan Statistical Area, which is also included in the Kansas City-Overland Park-Kansas City, MO-KS Combined Statistical Area.

== Geography ==
According to the U.S. Census Bureau, the county has a total area of 833 square miles (2,160 km^{2}), of which 829 square miles (2,150 km^{2}) is land and 3.9 square miles (10 km^{2}) (0.5%) is water.

=== Adjacent counties ===
- Lafayette County (north)
- Pettis County (east)
- Henry County (south)
- Cass County (west)
- Jackson County (northwest)

=== Major highways ===
- U.S. Route 50
- Route 2
- Route 13
- Route 23
- Route 58
- Route 131

== Demographics ==
Historical population
Census	Pop.	Note	%±
1840	4,471		—
1850	7,464		66.9%
1860	14,614		95.8%
1870	24,648		68.7%
1880	28,172		14.3%
1890	28,132		−0.1%
1900	27,843		−1.0%
1910	26,297		−5.6%
1920	24,899		−5.3%
1930	22,413		−10.0%
1940	21,617		−3.6%
1950	20,716		−4.2%
1960	28,981		39.9%
1970	34,172		17.9%
1980	39,059		14.3%
1990	42,514		8.8%
2000	48,258		13.5%
2010	52,595		9.0%
2020	54,013		2.7%
2025 (est.)	56,670	▲	4.9%
U.S. Decennial Census:

=== 2020 census ===
As of the 2020 census, the county had a population of 54,013 and a median age of 32.1 years. 22.5% of residents were under the age of 18 and 13.8% were 65 years of age or older. For every 100 females there were 102.4 males overall and 101.7 males age 18 and over.

There were 20,321 households in the county, of which 31.2% had children under the age of 18 living with them and 21.1% had a female householder with no spouse or partner present. About 26.8% of all households were made up of individuals and 8.8% had someone living alone who was 65 years of age or older.

There were 22,601 housing units, of which 10.1% were vacant. Among occupied housing units, 61.8% were owner-occupied and 38.2% were renter-occupied. The homeowner vacancy rate was 1.8% and the rental vacancy rate was 9.9%.

The racial makeup of the county was 84.0% White, 4.4% Black or African American, 0.6% American Indian and Alaska Native, 1.6% Asian, 0.4% Native Hawaiian and Pacific Islander, 1.3% from some other race, and 7.8% from two or more races. Hispanic or Latino residents of any race comprised 4.8% of the population.

About 47.2% of residents lived in urban areas, while 52.8% lived in rural areas.

=== Racial and ethnic composition ===
Johnson County, Missouri – Racial and ethnic composition Note: the US Census treats Hispanic/Latino as an ethnic category. This table excludes Latinos from the racial categories and assigns them to a separate category. Hispanics/Latinos may be of any race.
Race / Ethnicity (NH = Non-Hispanic)	Pop 1980	Pop 1990	Pop 2000	Pop 2010	Pop 2020	% 1980	% 1990	% 2000	% 2010	% 2020
White alone (NH)	36,012	38,589	42,803	46,367	44,415	92.20%	90.77%	88.70%	88.16%	82.23%
Black or African American alone (NH)	1,952	2,407	2,064	2,227	2,309	5.00%	5.66%	4.28%	4.23%	4.27%
Native American or Alaska Native alone (NH)	75	199	297	245	259	0.19%	0.47%	0.62%	0.47%	0.48%
Asian alone (NH)	398	584	687	781	821	1.02%	1.37%	1.42%	1.48%	1.52%
Native Hawaiian or Pacific Islander alone (NH)	x	x	56	120	210	x	x	0.12%	0.23%	0.39%
Other race alone (NH)	68	26	75	44	203	0.17%	0.06%	0.16%	0.08%	0.38%
Mixed race or Multiracial (NH)	x	x	869	1,200	3,201	x	x	1.80%	2.28%	5.93%
Hispanic or Latino (any race)	554	709	1,407	1,611	2,595	1.42%	1.67%	2.92%	3.06%	4.80%
Total	39,059	42,514	48,258	52,595	54,013	100.00%	100.00%	100.00%	100.00%	100.00%

=== 2000 census ===
As of the census of 2000, there were 48,258 people, 17,410 households, and 11,821 families residing in the county. The population density was 58 people per square mile (22 people/km^{2}). There were 18,886 housing units at an average density of 23 units per square mile (8.9/km^{2}). The racial makeup of the county was 90.12% White, 4.33% Black or African American, 0.65% Native American, 1.43% Asian, 0.13% Pacific Islander, 1.29% from other races, and 2.05% from two or more races. Approximately 2.92% of the population were Hispanic or Latino of any race.

There were 17,410 households, out of which 35.10% had children under the age of 18 living with them, 55.90% were married couples living together, 8.50% had a female householder with no husband present, and 32.10% were non-families. 22.70% of all households were made up of individuals, and 7.10% had someone living alone who was 65 years of age or older. The average household size was 2.58 and the average family size was 3.07.

In the county, the population was spread out, with 25.10% under the age of 18, 20.20% from 18 to 24, 27.60% from 25 to 44, 17.80% from 45 to 64, and 9.30% who were 65 years of age or older. The median age was 28 years. For every 100 females there were 101.90 males. For every 100 females age 18 and over, there were 100.40 males.

The median income for a household in the county was $35,391, and the median income for a family was $43,050. Males had a median income of $28,901 versus $21,376 for females. The per capita income for the county was $16,037. About 9.50% of families and 14.90% of the population were below the poverty line, including 15.20% of those under age 18 and 10.80% of those age 65 or over.

== Education ==
=== Public schools ===
- Chilhowee R-IV School District – Chilhowee
  - Chilhowee Elementary School (P–6)
  - Chilhowee High School (7–12)
- Holden R-III School District – Holden
  - Holden Elementary School (P–5)
  - Holden Intermediate School (3–5)
  - Holden Middle School (6–8)
  - Holden High School (9–12)
- Johnson County R-VII School District – Centerview
  - Crest Ridge Elementary School (P–5)
  - Crest Ridge Middle School (6–8)
  - Crest Ridge High School (9–12)
- Kingsville R-I School District – Kingsville
  - Kingsville Elementary School (K–6)
  - Kingsville High School (7–12)
- Knob Noster R-VIII School District – Knob Noster
  - Knob Noster Elementary School (P–5)
  - Whiteman Air Force Base Elementary School (P–5) – Whiteman
  - Knob Noster Middle School (6–8)
  - Knob Noster High School (9–12)
- Leeton R-X School District – Leeton
  - Leeton Elementary School (P–5)
  - Leeton Middle School (6–8)
  - Leeton High School (9–12)
- Warrensburg R-VI School District – Warrensburg
  - Reese Early Childhood Education Center
  - Maple Grove Elementary School (P–2)
  - Ridge View Elementary School (P–2)
  - Martin Warren Elementary School (3–5)
  - Sterling Elementary School (3–5)
  - Warrensburg Middle School (6–8)
  - Warrensburg High School (9–12)
  - Warrensburg Area Career Center

=== Private schools ===
- Johnson County Christian Academy – Centerview (K–9) – Nondenominational Christian

=== Post-secondary ===
- University of Central Missouri – Warrensburg – A public, four-year university

=== Public libraries ===
- Holden Public Library
- Trails Regional Library

== Politics ==
=== Local ===
The Republican Party predominantly controls politics at the local level in Johnson County. Republicans hold all elected offices in Johnson County.

Johnson County, Missouri

Elected countywide officials
Assessor	Mark Reynolds	Republican
Auditor	Chad Davis	Republican
Circuit Clerk	Marcy Anderson	Republican
County Clerk	Diane Thompson	Republican
Collector	Laura Smith	Republican
Commissioner (presiding)	Troy A. Matthews	Republican
Commissioner (district 1)	John Marr	Republican
Commissioner (district 2)	Charles Kavanaugh	Republican
Coroner	Clark Holdren	Republican
Prosecuting Attorney	Rob Russell	Republican
Public Administrator	Nancy Jo Jennings	Republican
Recorder	Stormy Taylor	Republican
Sheriff	Scott Munsterman	Republican
Treasurer	Heather Reynolds	Republican

=== State ===
Past Gubernatorial Elections Results
Year	Republican	Democratic	Third Parties
2024	68.60% 15,991	28.96% 6,751	2.44% 569
2020	66.53% 15,321	29.94% 6,895	3.52% 811
2016	56.88% 12,040	39.38% 8,335	3.74% 793
2012	45.67% 9,484	50.22% 10,428	4.11% 853
2008	43.29% 9,367	53.88% 11,658	2.82% 613
2004	53.54% 10,767	44.55% 8,958	1.91% 384
2000	49.27% 8,219	47.75% 7,964	2.98% 497
1996	34.65% 5,024	62.63% 9,082	2.72% 394

Johnson County is divided into four legislative districts in the Missouri House of Representatives, all of which are held by Republicans.

- District 51 — Dean Dohrman (R-La Monte). Consists of the eastern half of the city of Warrensburg.

Missouri House of Representatives — District 51 — Johnson County (2016)
Party	Candidate	Votes	%	±%
Republican	Dean Dohrman	3,713	67.39%	+13.82
Democratic	John Cozort	1,797	32.61%	−7.99

Missouri House of Representatives — District 51 — Johnson County (2014)
Party	Candidate	Votes	%	±%
Republican	Dean Dohrman	1,792	53.57%	+4.43
Democratic	Gary L. Grigsby	1,358	40.60%	−5.70
Libertarian	Bill Wayne	195	5.83%	+1.27

Missouri House of Representatives — District 51 — Johnson County (2012)
Party	Candidate	Votes	%	±%
Republican	Dean Dohrman	2,611	49.14%	
Democratic	Gary L. Grigsby	2,460	46.30%	
Libertarian	Bill Wayne	242	4.56%	

- District 52 — Nathan Beard (R-Sedalia). Consists of the community of Knob Noster, and Whiteman Air Force Base.

Missouri House of Representatives — District 52 — Johnson County (2016)
Party	Candidate	Votes	%	±%
Republican	Nathan Beard	1,189	69.74%	−30.26
Democratic	Kyle Garner	516	30.26%	+30.26

Missouri House of Representatives — District 52 — Johnson County (2014)
Party	Candidate	Votes	%	±%
Republican	Nathan Beard	711	100.00%	+34.18

Missouri House of Representatives — District 52 — Johnson County (2012)
Party	Candidate	Votes	%	±%
Republican	Stanley Cox	986	65.82%	
Democratic	Phyllis Sue Domann	512	34.18%	

- District 53 — Glen Kolkmeyer (R-Odessa). Consists of the northern section of the county.

Missouri House of Representatives – District 122 – Johnson County (2016)
Party	Candidate	Votes	%	±%
Republican	Glen Kolkmeyer	582	100.00%	+34.36

Missouri House of Representatives — District 53 — Johnson County (2014)
Party	Candidate	Votes	%	±%
Republican	Glen Kolkmeyer	235	65.64%	+5.33
Democratic	Henry Grubb	123	34.36%	−5.33

Missouri House of Representatives — District 53 — Johnson County (2012)
Party	Candidate	Votes	%	±%
Republican	Glen Kolkmeyer	383	60.31%	
Democratic	Holmes Osborne	252	39.69%	

- District 54 — Dan Houx (R- Warrensburg). Consists of western half of the city of Warrensburg and the communities of Centerview, Chilhowee, Holden, Kingsville, La Tour, and Leeton.

Missouri House of Representatives — District 54 — Johnson County (2016)
Party	Candidate	Votes	%	±%
Republican	Dan Houx	8,316	65.41%	−12.70
Democratic	Bob Gregory	3,549	27.92%	+27.92
Libertarian	Steve Daugherty	848	6.67%	+6.67

Missouri House of Representatives — District 54 — Johnson County (2014)
Party	Candidate	Votes	%	±%
Republican	Denny Hoskins	5,279	78.11%	+17.44
Constitution	Daniel Plemons	1,479	21.89%	+21.89

Missouri House of Representatives — District 54 — Johnson County (2012)
Party	Candidate	Votes	%	±%
Republican	Denny Hoskins	7,753	60.67%	
Democratic	Nancy Maxwell	3,885	30.40%	
Independent	Eddie Osborne	1,140	8.92%	

All of Johnson County is a part of Missouri's 21st District in the Missouri Senate and is currently represented by Denny Hoskins (R-Warrensburg).

Missouri Senate — District 21 — Johnson County (2016)
Party	Candidate	Votes	%	±%
Republican	Denny Hoskins	14,641	70.46%	−2.70
Democratic	ElGene Ver Dught	5,028	24.20%	+1.64
Libertarian	Bill Wayne	1,110	5.34%	+1.07

Missouri Senate — District 21 — Johnson County (2012)
Party	Candidate	Votes	%	±%
Republican	David Pearce	14,983	73.16%	
Democratic	ElGene Ver Dught	4,621	22.56%	
Libertarian	Steven Hedrick	875	4.27%	

=== Federal ===
U.S. Senate — Missouri — Johnson County (2016)
Party	Candidate	Votes	%	±%
Republican	Roy Blunt	11,611	54.88%	+13.41
Democratic	Jason Kander	8,315	39.30%	−9.80
Libertarian	Jonathan Dine	714	3.37%	−6.06
Green	Johnathan McFarland	268	1.27%	+1.27
Constitution	Fred Ryman	248	1.17%	+1.17

U.S. Senate — Missouri — Johnson County (2012)
Party	Candidate	Votes	%	±%
Republican	Todd Akin	8,613	41.47%	
Democratic	Claire McCaskill	10,197	49.10%	
Libertarian	Jonathan Dine	1,959	9.43%	

All of Johnson County is included in Missouri's 4th Congressional District and is currently represented by Vicky Hartzler (R-Harrisonville) in the U.S. House of Representatives.

U.S. House of Representatives — Missouri's 4th Congressional District — Johnson County (2016)
Party	Candidate	Votes	%	±%
Republican	Vicky Hartzler	14,102	67.63%	−0.14
Democratic	Gordon Christensen	5,584	26.78%	+1.05
Libertarian	Mark Bliss	1,167	5.59%	−0.91

U.S. House of Representatives — Missouri's 4th Congressional District — Johnson County (2014)
Party	Candidate	Votes	%	±%
Republican	Vicky Hartzler	7,770	67.77%	+7.59
Democratic	Nate Irvin	2,950	25.73%	−9.05
Libertarian	Herschel L. Young	745	6.50%	+2.48

U.S. House of Representatives — Missouri’s 4th Congressional District — Johnson County (2012)
Party	Candidate	Votes	%	±%
Republican	Vicky Hartzler	12,356	60.18%	
Democratic	Teresa Hensley	7,140	34.78%	
Libertarian	Thomas Holbrook	825	4.02%	
Constitution	Greg Cowan	209	1.02%	

==== Political culture ====
Johnson is a solidly Republican county. The last Democrat to carry Johnson County was Bill Clinton in 1992.

United States presidential election results for Johnson County, Missouri
Year	Republican		Democratic		Third party(ies)	
Year	No.	%	No.	%	No.	%
1888	2,895	46.33%	3,183	50.94%	171	2.74%
1892	2,667	41.28%	3,109	48.12%	685	10.60%
1896	3,219	42.88%	4,240	56.48%	48	0.64%
1900	3,051	44.76%	3,612	52.99%	153	2.24%
1904	2,989	46.56%	3,277	51.05%	153	2.38%
1908	2,997	45.44%	3,483	52.81%	115	1.74%
1912	1,772	27.02%	3,468	52.87%	1,319	20.11%
1916	2,966	43.83%	3,701	54.69%	100	1.48%
1920	5,700	50.66%	5,444	48.38%	108	0.96%
1924	5,248	47.68%	5,526	50.21%	232	2.11%
1928	7,032	61.86%	4,316	37.97%	19	0.17%
1932	4,088	38.40%	6,481	60.88%	76	0.71%
1936	5,797	47.86%	6,294	51.96%	22	0.18%
1940	6,468	54.23%	5,441	45.62%	19	0.16%
1944	5,949	57.32%	4,419	42.58%	10	0.10%
1948	4,903	50.01%	4,888	49.85%	14	0.14%
1952	6,990	61.82%	4,294	37.98%	23	0.20%
1956	6,599	59.30%	4,530	40.70%	0	0.00%
1960	6,970	59.66%	4,712	40.34%	0	0.00%
1964	4,348	40.41%	6,412	59.59%	0	0.00%
1968	4,834	51.78%	3,484	37.32%	1,018	10.90%
1972	7,228	70.37%	3,044	29.63%	0	0.00%
1976	5,513	49.14%	5,551	49.47%	156	1.39%
1980	6,449	51.24%	5,441	43.23%	695	5.52%
1984	8,413	66.50%	4,238	33.50%	0	0.00%
1988	7,512	58.14%	5,373	41.58%	36	0.28%
1992	5,032	33.10%	5,546	36.48%	4,625	30.42%
1996	6,276	43.06%	6,220	42.68%	2,078	14.26%
2000	9,339	55.63%	6,926	41.26%	522	3.11%
2004	12,257	60.57%	7,790	38.50%	189	0.93%
2008	12,183	55.18%	9,480	42.93%	417	1.89%
2012	12,763	60.72%	7,667	36.47%	591	2.81%
2016	13,719	64.22%	5,930	27.76%	1,713	8.02%
2020	15,489	66.99%	6,974	30.16%	660	2.85%
2024	16,298	69.05%	6,960	29.49%	344	1.46%

== Communities ==
=== Cities ===
- Holden
- Knob Noster
- Warrensburg (county seat)

=== Villages ===
- Centerview
- Leeton
- Chilhowee
- Kingsville

=== Census-designated places ===
- La Tour
- Whiteman AFB

=== Other unincorporated places ===
- Bowen
- Bowmansville
- Burtville
- Columbus
- Cornelia
- Denton
- Dunksburg
- Elm
- Fayetteville
- Fulkerson
- Greendoor
- Henrietta
- Hoffman
- Magnolia
- Medford
- Montserrat
- Mount Olive
- Owsley
- Pittsville
- Post Oak
- Quick City
- Robbins
- Rose Hill
- Sutherland
- Valley City

== See also ==
- List of counties in Missouri
- Missouri census statistical areas
- National Register of Historic Places listings in Johnson County, Missouri
