= Katy Trail State Park =

State park in Missouri, United States

Katy Trail
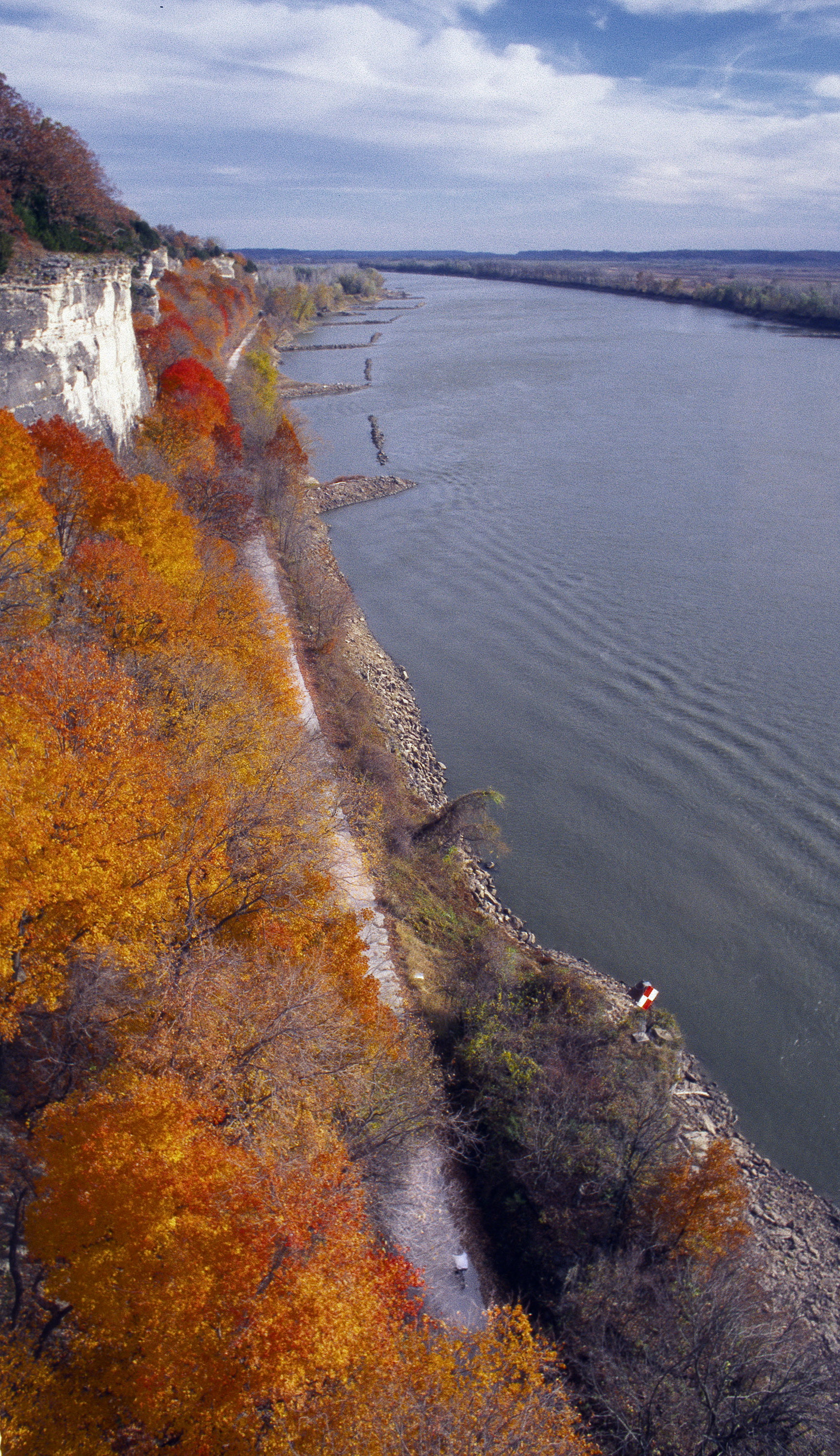
- The Manitou Bluffs section of the Katy Trail along the Missouri River in Boone County
- Length: 237.7 mi (382.5 km)
- Location: Missouri, United States
- Trailheads: Machens, Missouri; Clinton, Missouri
- Use: Hiking, Cycling, Horseback
- Elevation change: negligible
- Highest point: Windsor, Missouri
- Lowest point: St. Charles, Missouri
- Difficulty: Easy
- Season: All
- Sights: Missouri River, Manitou Bluffs
- Hazards: Severe weather Poison ivy Snakes
- Website: Katy Trail State Park

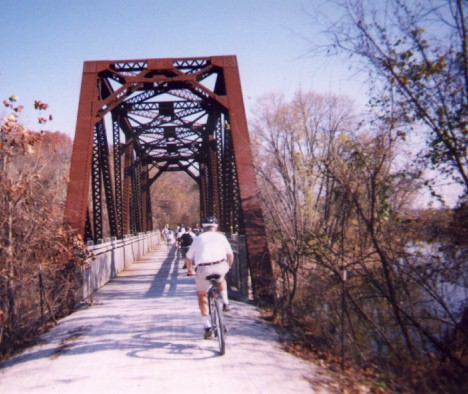
Cyclists crossing an erstwhile railroad bridge over the Femme Osage Creek near Defiance

The Katy Trail State Park is a state park in the U.S. state of Missouri that contains the Katy Trail, the country's longest continuous recreational rail trail. It runs 240 miles (390 km), largely along the northern bank of the Missouri River, in the former right-of-way of the Missouri–Kansas–Texas Railroad. Open year-round from sunrise to sunset, it serves hikers, joggers, and cyclists. Its hard, flat surface is of "limestone pug" (crushed limestone).

The nickname "Katy" comes from the phonetic pronunciation of "KT", a short form of the railroad's abbreviated name, MKT. Sections of the Katy are also part of the Lewis and Clark National Historic Trail and the American Discovery Trail.

== History ==
Early rails-to-trails conversions were encouraged by 1976 amendments to the National Trails System Act of 1968, which provided a 180-day negotiation window for municipalities to purchase abandoned rail corridors. In 1982, the city of Columbia utilized this traditional abandonment process to open the MKT Trail, one of the first rail trails in the United States, on a spur of the Katy. The preservation of the much larger Katy main line was made possible by a subsequent 1983 amendment to the Act. This amendment established the legal mechanism of railbanking, which allowed the state to assume control of the out-of-service corridor for trail use.

On October 4, 1986, floodwater from the Missouri River severely damaged the track along the Missouri–Kansas–Texas Railroad's route from Sedalia to Machens, Missouri. The route had been washed out and repaired many times, but this time, railroad officials decided not to return the tracks to service. Trains were re-routed, and the right-of-way was to be abandoned. The Missouri Department of Natural Resources purchased the right-of-way with a donation from Edward D. "Ted" Jones and Pat Jones of Williamsburg and St. Louis. In 1990, the first segment of the trail officially opened in Rocheport.

In 1991, the Union Pacific Railroad donated 33 miles (53 km) of right-of-way from Sedalia to Clinton.

The trail was initially planned for completion in 1994. However, the Great Flood of 1993 damaged 75 miles (121 km) of the original 126 miles (203 km) of the trail. The completed trail from St. Charles to Sedalia was finally opened in 1996; the section from Sedalia to Clinton opened in 1999.

In 2011, the trail was expanded to include the corridor from St. Charles to Machens.

== Trail networks ==
A new section of trail on the Rock Island railroad corridor opened in December 2016. The Rock Island Spur starts at Windsor, on the Katy Trail, and runs 47 miles northwest towards Kansas City. The trail, originally slated to be named Rock Island Trail State Park, extends the trail system to the suburbs of Kansas City at Pleasant Hill on rail banked right-of-way of the Chicago, Rock Island and Pacific Railroad.

A settlement to allow the use of this portion of the Rock Island corridor was reached between Missouri Governor Matt Blunt and Ameren as partial compensation for a flood which devastated Johnson's Shut-ins State Park after the failure of a dam owned by Ameren.

Efforts are being made to extend that trail from Pleasant Hill further into the center of the Kansas City metro area. A six-mile segment of that trail opened in the Lee's Summit area in 2019.

Plans are underway to add another 144-mile (232 km) unused section of the Chicago, Rock Island and Pacific to Rock Island Trail State Park, which, with the Katy, would create a 450-mile (720 km) trail network. The extension would run from Windsor to Beaufort, near Washington. Preliminary plans are to then extend the trail into Washington from where it could cross the Missouri River to connect to the Katy Trail again, completing a cross-state loop.

A "quad state" proposal would connect the Katy and other existing trails in Missouri, Kansas, Iowa, and Nebraska.

== Route ==
The Katy Trail currently begins at Machens (mile-marker 27) on the Missouri River and runs along the northern bank of the river for most of the trail's length. The next major city along the trail is Jefferson City, the state capital. At mile-marker 169.9 (McBaine), the trail intersects the MKT Trail, which leads into downtown Columbia, the largest city along the trail. The Katy trail then deviates from the rail route, crossing the Missouri River at Boonville on the Boonslick Bridge instead of the original MKT Bridge, then running to its terminus in Clinton at mile-marker 264.6.

City	Mile-marker	Coordinates
Machens	27	38.9035°N 90.3314°W
St. Charles	39	38.7793°N 90.4811°W
Weldon Spring	55	38.6600°N 90.7444°W
Defiance	59	38.6300°N 90.7794°W
Matson	60.6	38.6087°N 90.7948°W
Augusta	66	38.5698°N 90.8808°W
Hermann	100	38.7339°N 91.4447°W
Bluffton	111	38.7056°N 91.6241°W
Jefferson City	143	38.6059°N 92.1623°W
Hartsburg	153	38.6943°N 92.3099°W
Columbia	169.9 (via MKT Trail)	38.9506°N 92.3331°W
Rocheport	179	38.9776°N 92.5612°W
Boonville	192	38.9749°N 92.7497°W
Sedalia	227	38.7078°N 93.2206°W
Windsor	248	38.5356°N 93.5250°W
Clinton	265	38.3845°N 93.7578°W

== MKT bridge at Boonville ==
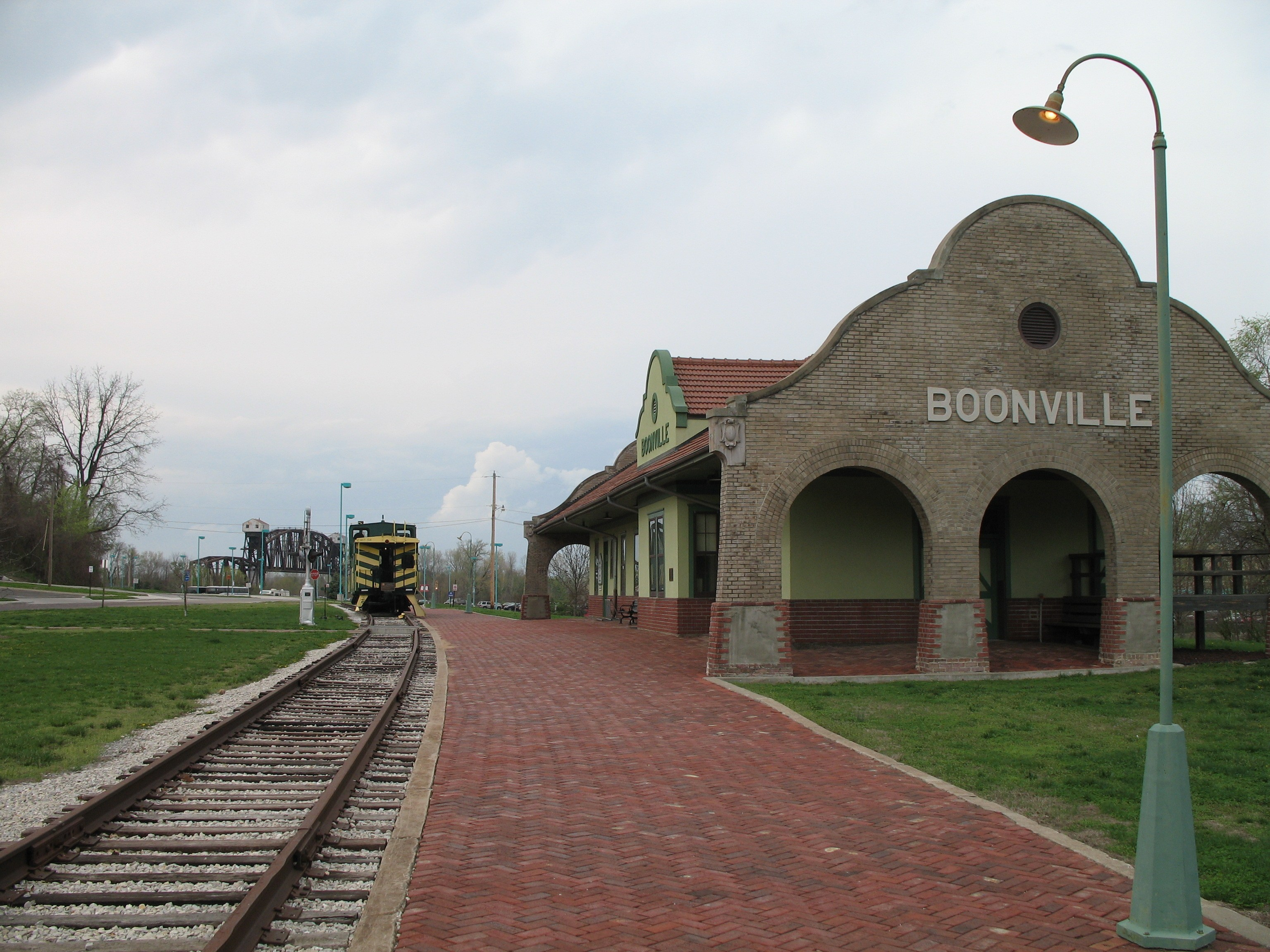
Former MKT depot in Boonville, with the MKT Bridge in the distance

The Katy Trail is part of the U.S. railbank, which means it must remain connected to the national railway network so that it could be returned to active railway use. The segment of the trail between St. Charles and Sedalia was connected in two locations. One of these connections is in St. Charles and the other was provided by the Missouri–Kansas–Texas Bridge at Boonville. The Missouri Department of Natural Resources was granted the right to keep the bridge in place and to use it at the MDNR's discretion as part of the trail under the Interim Trail Agreement of June 25, 1987. But on April 28, 2005, the Missouri Department of Natural Resources amended the agreement, abandoning its rights to the bridge and allowing Union Pacific to remove the bridge and thus creating two independent segments in the trail, east and west of Boonville. If the connection in St. Charles is destroyed or otherwise rendered unusable by rail (such as by natural disaster), the segment of the trail between St. Charles and Boonville would lose its railbanked status and ownership of the land would probably revert to its original owners from before the MKT Line was built. The same could happen to the segment east of Boonville if its connection is lost.

On February 4, 2010, Missouri Governor Jay Nixon announced that Union Pacific Railroad would give the bridge to the city of Boonville, ending a nearly six-year dispute over the bridge and the trail. The city announced it would restore the bridge and incorporate it back into the Katy Trail bicycle and hiking trail.
