= Machens, Missouri =

Extinct hamlet in Missouri, U.S.

Coordinates: 38°54′11″N 90°19′56″W

Machens is an extinct town in St. Charles County, in the U.S. state of Missouri. The GNIS classifies it as a populated place. The eastern end of the Katy Trail, a recreational rail trail, is located at Machens.

A post office called Machens was established in 1895, and remained in operation until 1956. The community most likely was named after Andrew Machens, Sr.

Machens is now located at the intersection of MO-94 and Machens Road.
