= Missouri–Kansas–Texas Bridge =

Bridge crossing the Missouri River

Coordinates: 38.979167°N 92.75444°W

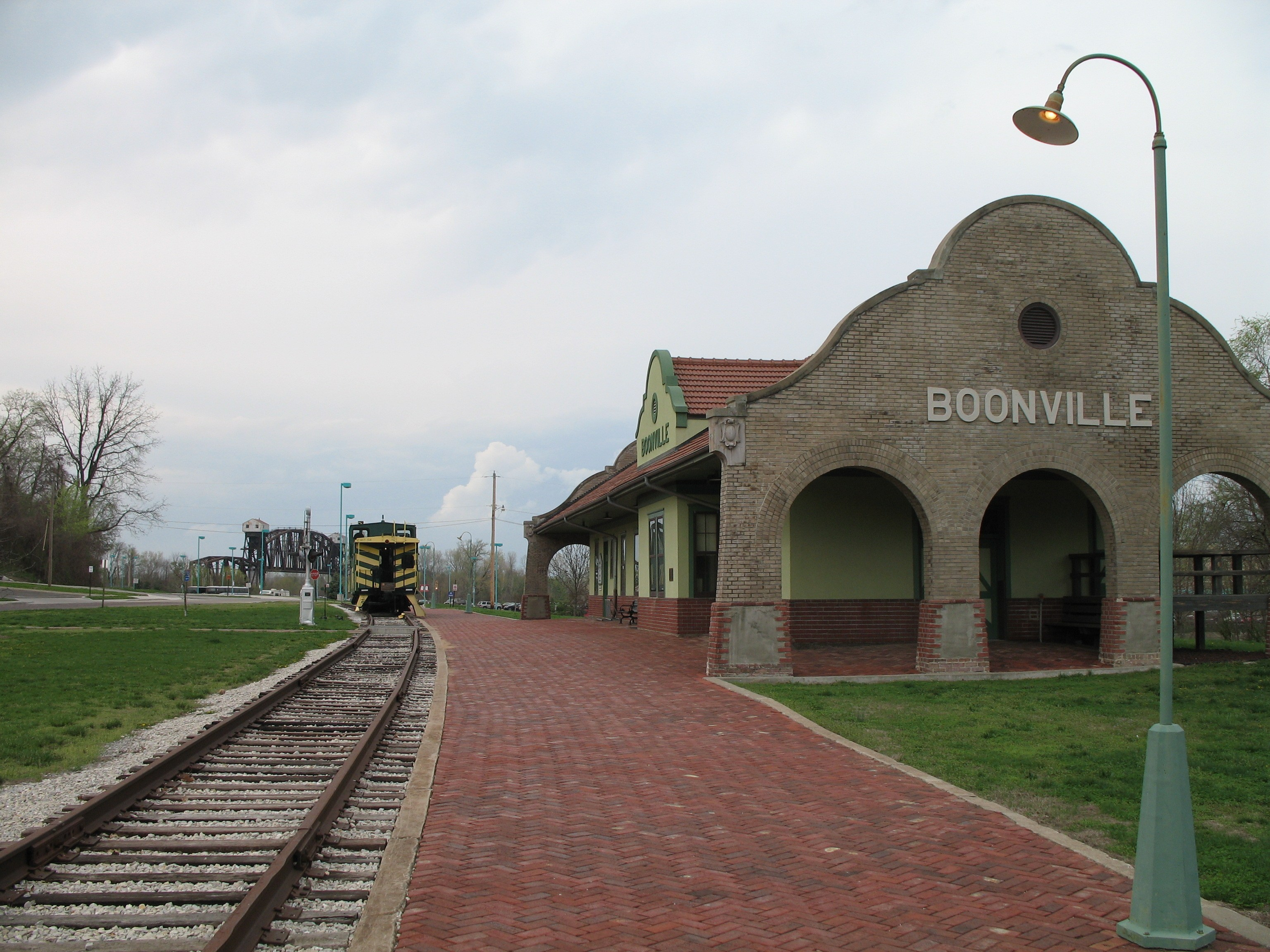
MKT Bridge from Boonville train depot on Katy Trail

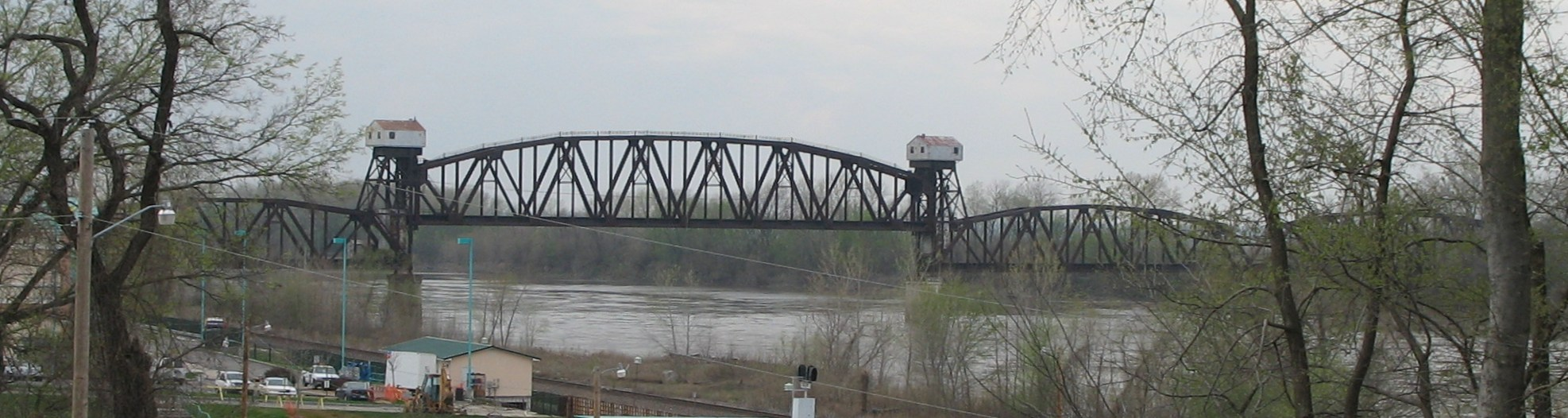
MKT Bridge from southeast

The Missouri–Kansas–Texas Bridge (also known as the "Katy Bridge" from MKT) is a former rail bridge across the Missouri River at Boonville, Missouri, where it connects Howard and Cooper counties. In 2010, the bridge was acquired by the city of Boonville from the Union Pacific Railroad. The city plans to incorporate it into the 225-mile Katy Trail bicycle trail.

The bridge was built in 1931-32 as MKT Bridge No. 191.1 by the Missouri-Kansas-Texas Railroad to replace an 1873 MKT structure. It has four trusses over the water and a vertical lift in the middle, and was constructed by Kansas City Bridge Company (substructure), American Bridge Company (superstructure), and General Electric Company (electric installation).

The rail line served by the bridge was acquired by Union Pacific Railroad, which later announced plans to abandon the line. In 1987, bicycle enthusiasts worked out an agreement to take use of the line for a rail trail administered by the Missouri Department of Natural Resources and stretching from St. Charles to Clinton. The agreement stipulated that the trail would be operated as a railbank and according to the desires of the railroad.

In 2004, the United States Coast Guard told Union Pacific that the unused bridge was a navigation hazard and should be dismantled. The railroad quietly began planning to float sections of the bridge to Jefferson City and use it as a new bridge across the Osage River. Bicycle enthusiasts caught wind of the move and launched a campaign to prevent it, fearing that if the bridge were torn down, the whole Katy Trail would have to be returned to adjoining property owners because it no longer was viable as a revitalized railroad.

Under Governor Bob Holden, the state government announced plans to take over bridge maintenance, but in 2005, Governor Matt Blunt cancelled the plans because of the estimated $3 million to $11 million cost to convert the bridge for trail use.

Missouri Attorney General Jay Nixon sued the Department of Natural Resources to enforce the original order permitting state takeover.

On February 4, 2010, Nixon, newly elected governor, said the Union Pacific would transfer ownership of the bridge to the city of Boonville. City officials plan to rehab the bridge and incorporate it into the Katy Trail.

== See also ==
- List of crossings of the Missouri River
- List of Missouri state parks
