= List of snakes of Missouri =

This is a list of known snakes in Missouri, United States.

== Non-venomous snakes ==
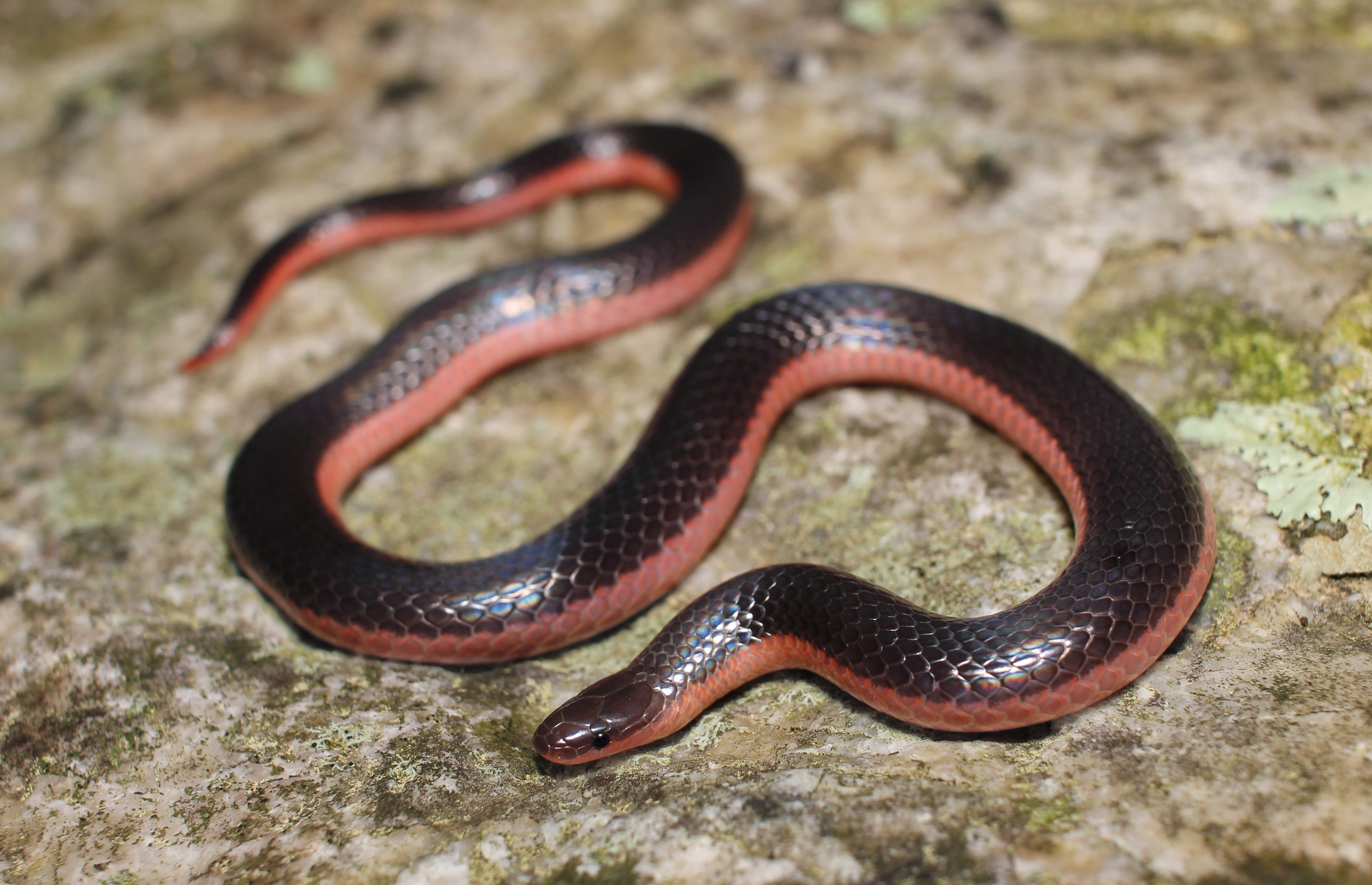
Western worm snake Carphophis vermis

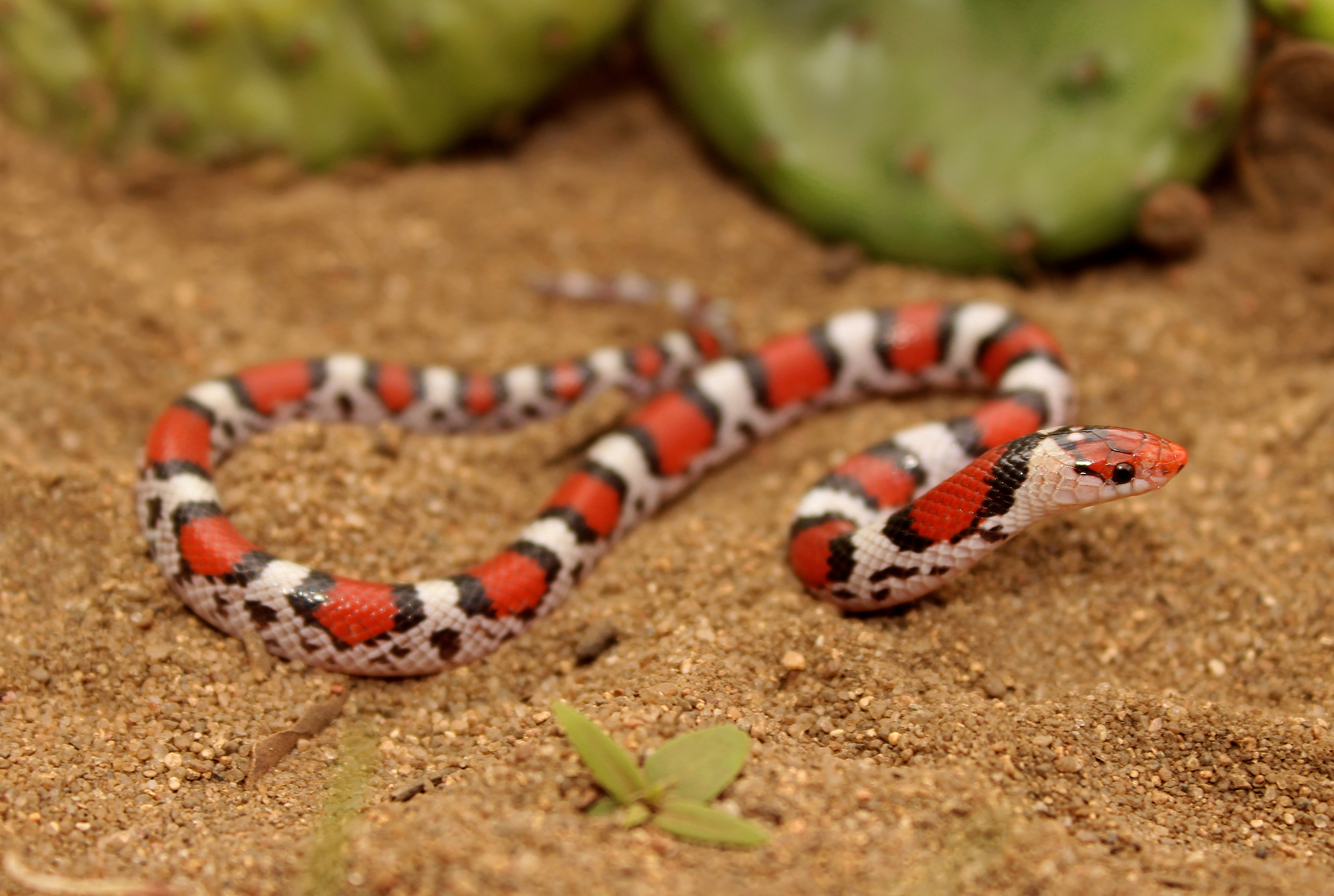
Northern scarlet snake Cemophora coccinea copei

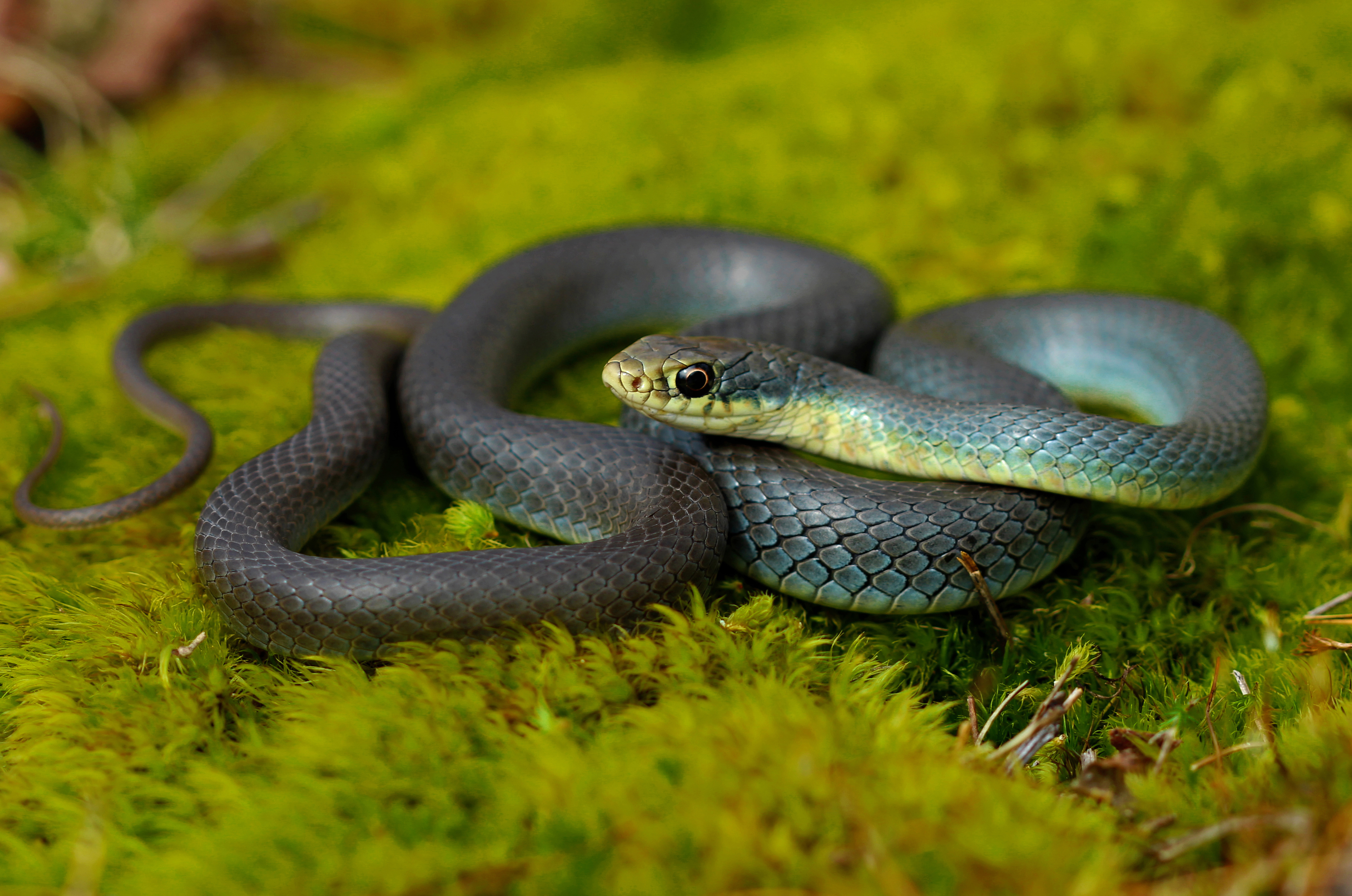
Eastern yellowbelly Racer Coluber constrictor flaviventris

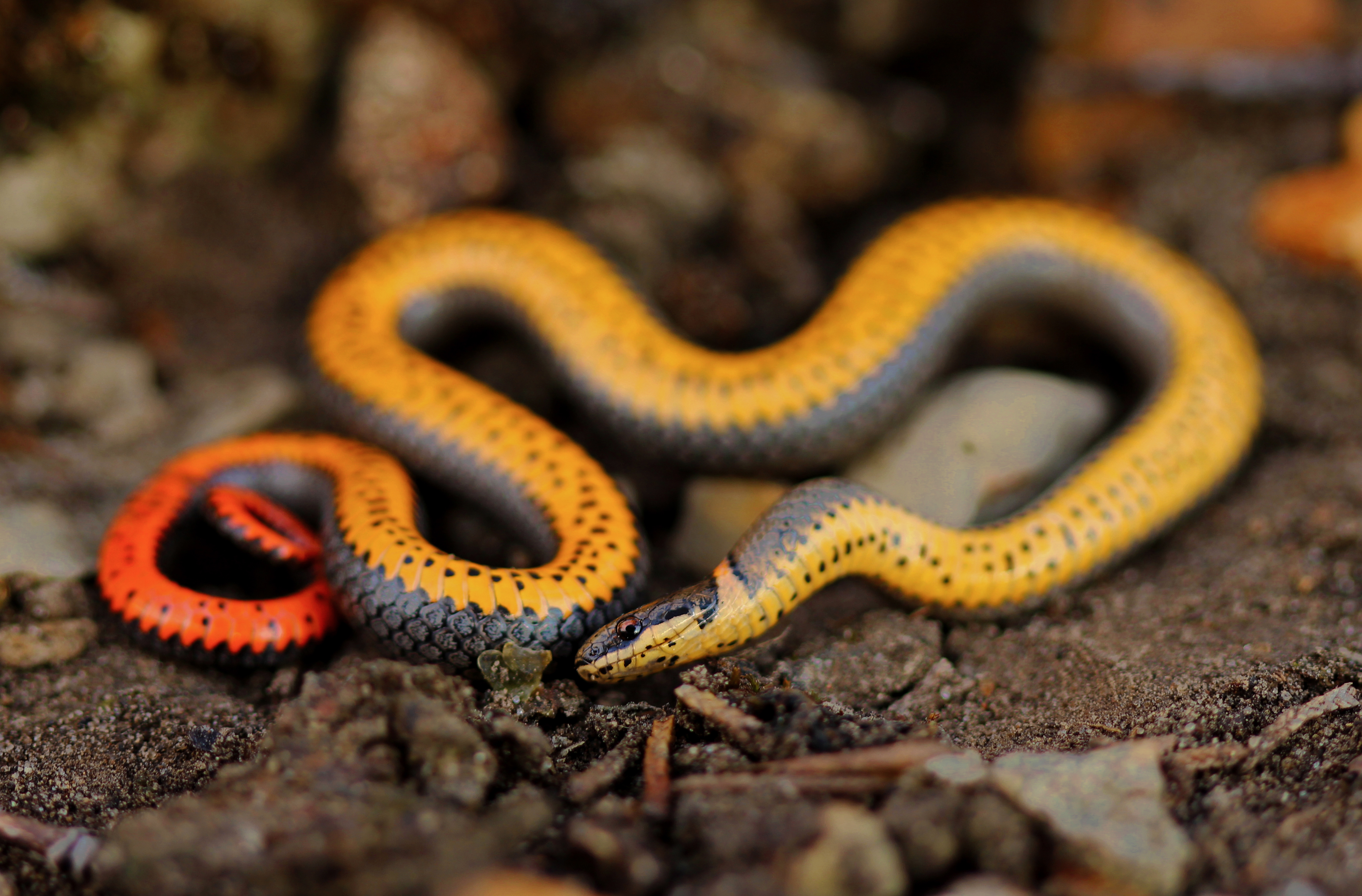
Prairie ring-necked snake Diadophis punctatus arnyi

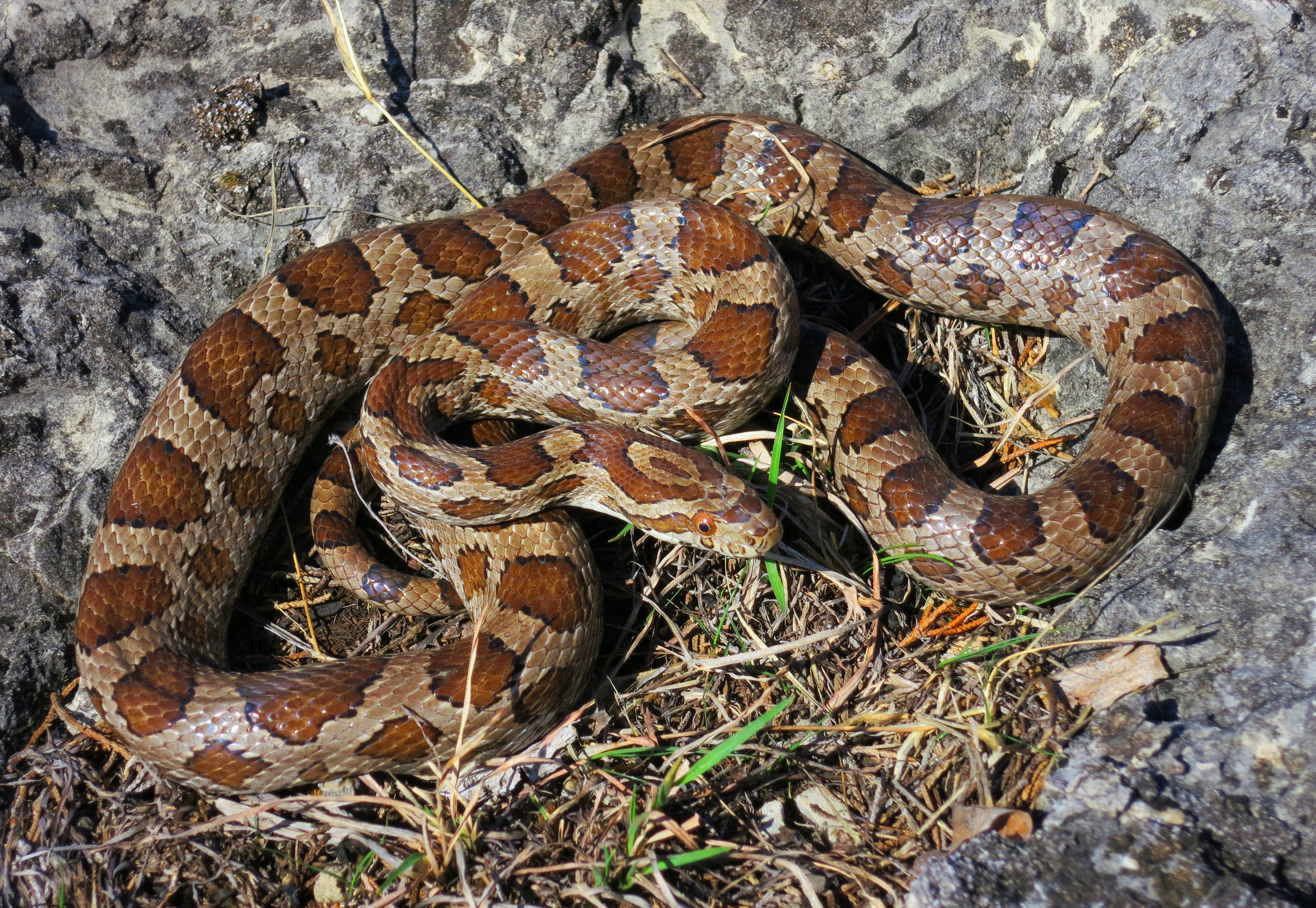
Great Plains rat snake Pantherophis emoryi

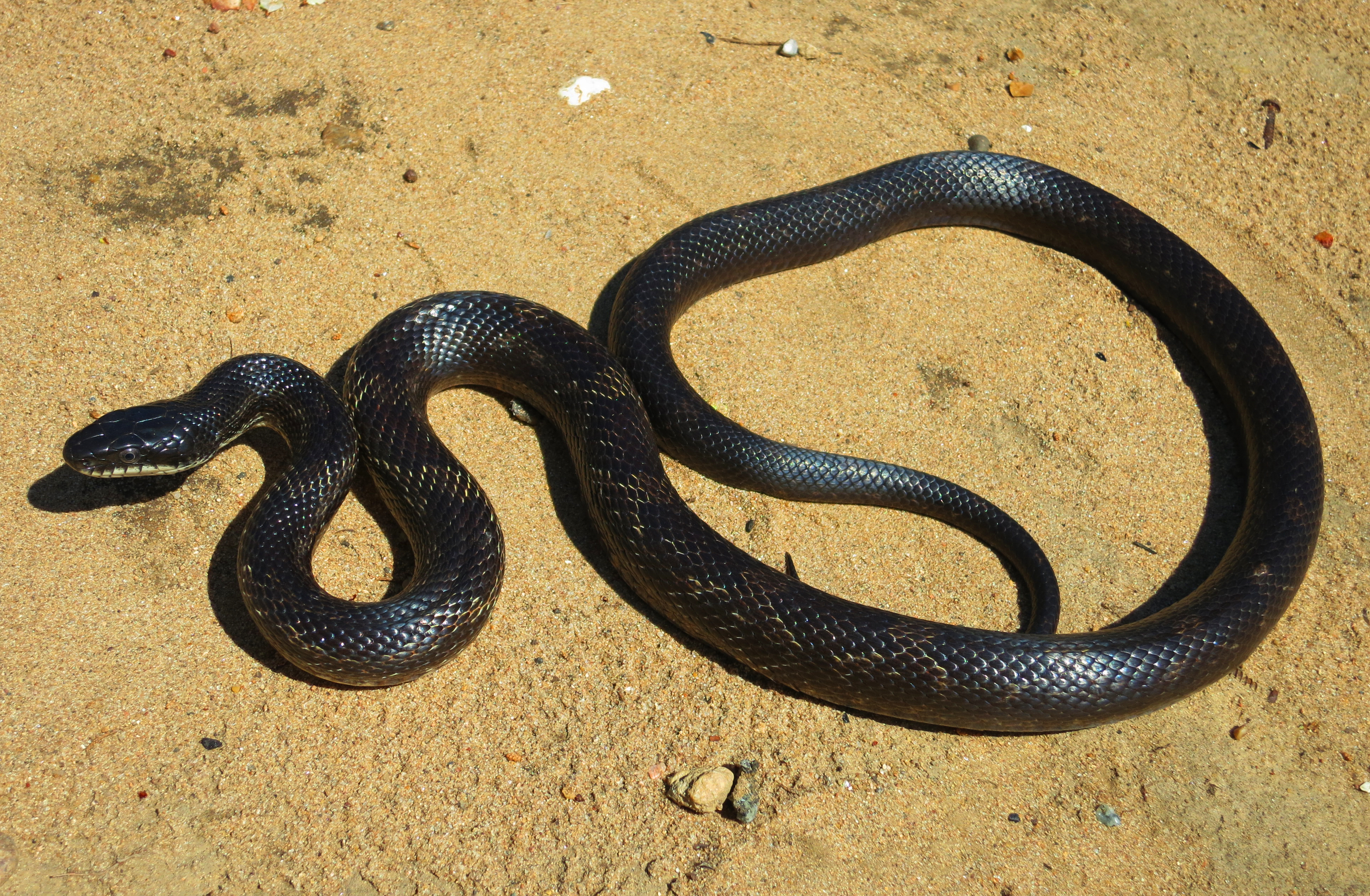
Western rat snake Pantherophis obsoletus

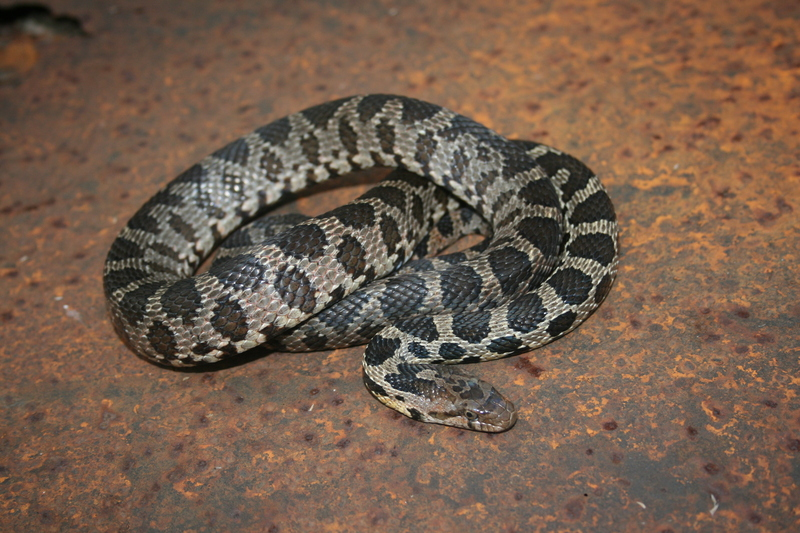
Western fox snake Pantherophis ramspotti

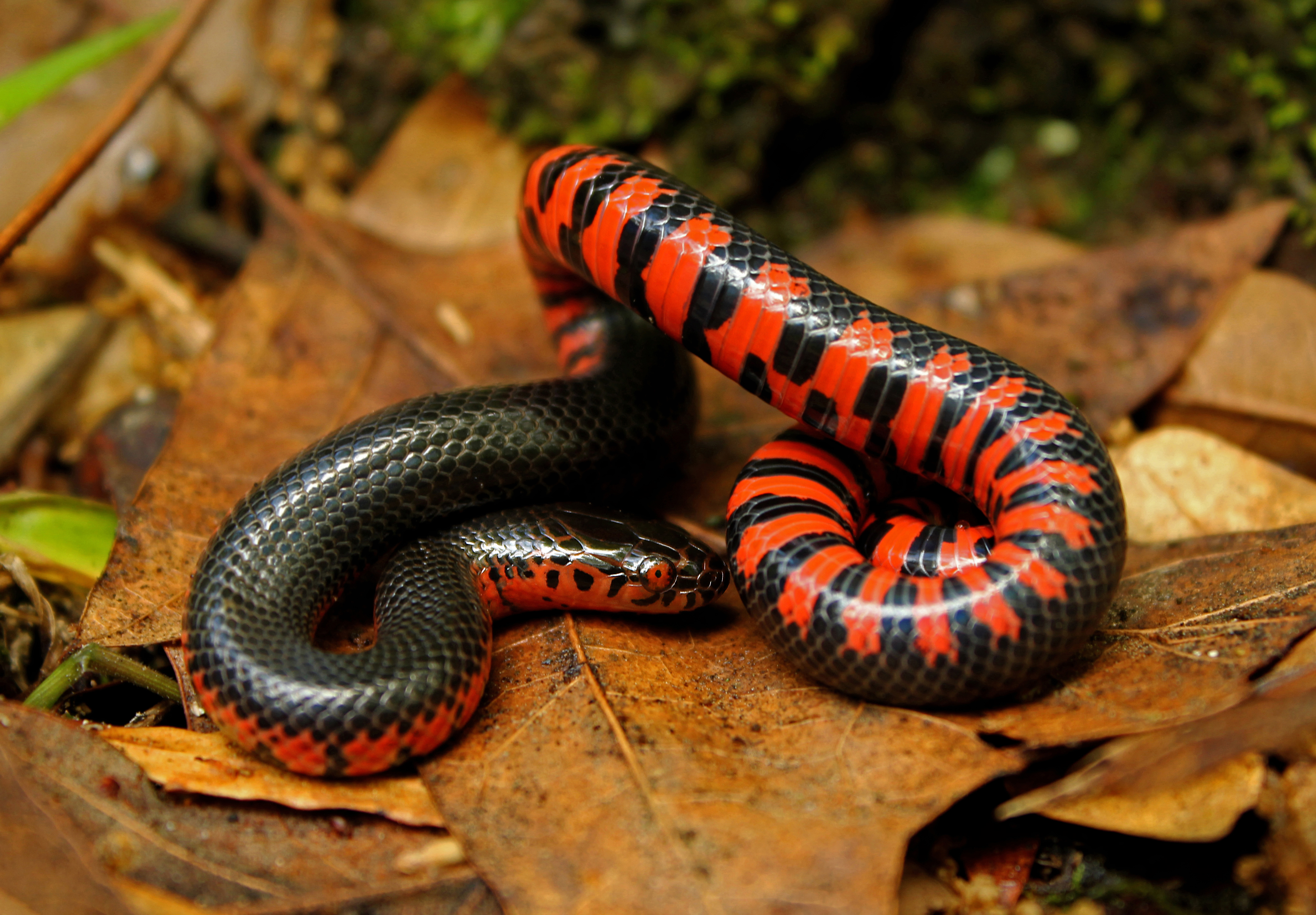
Western mud snake Farancia abacura reinwardtii

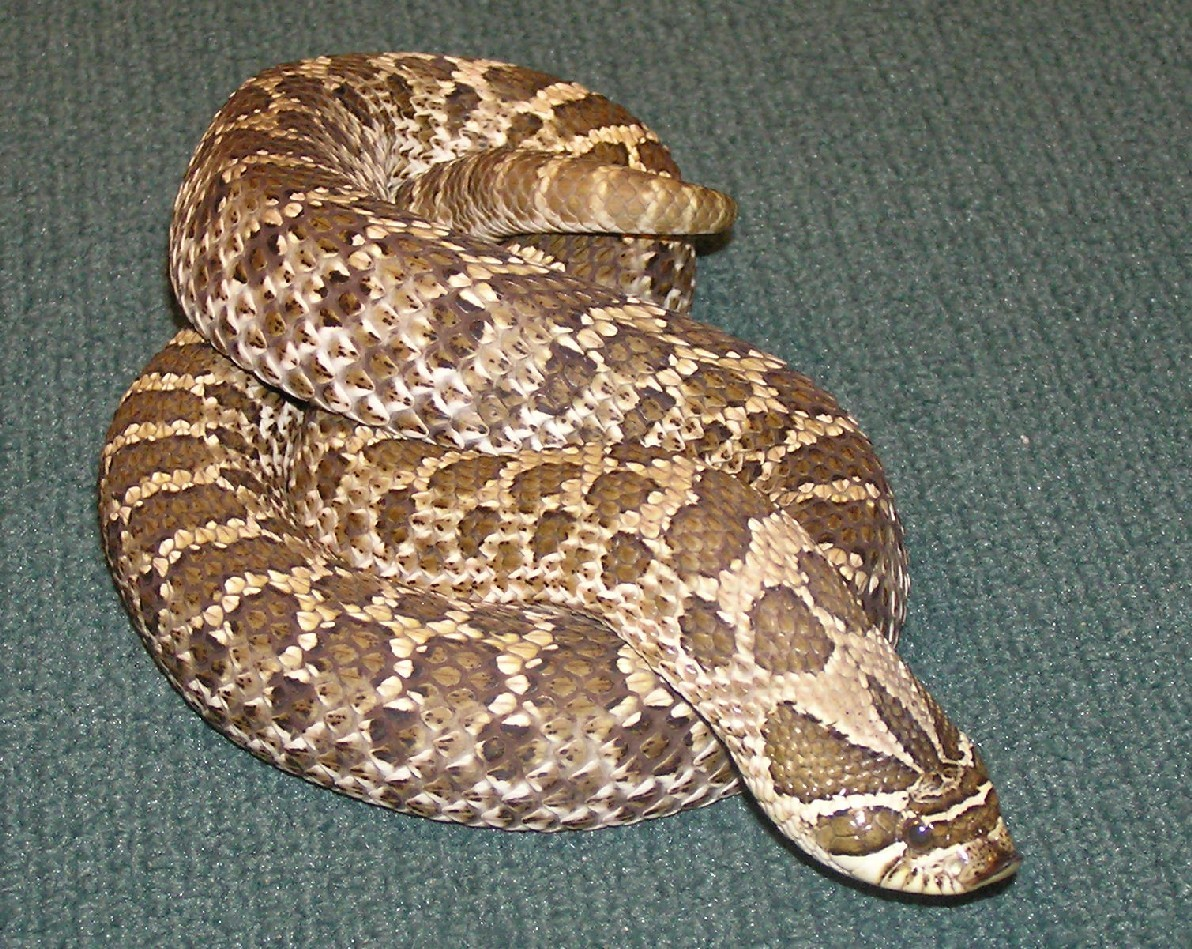
Plains hog-nosed snake Heterodon nasicus nasicus

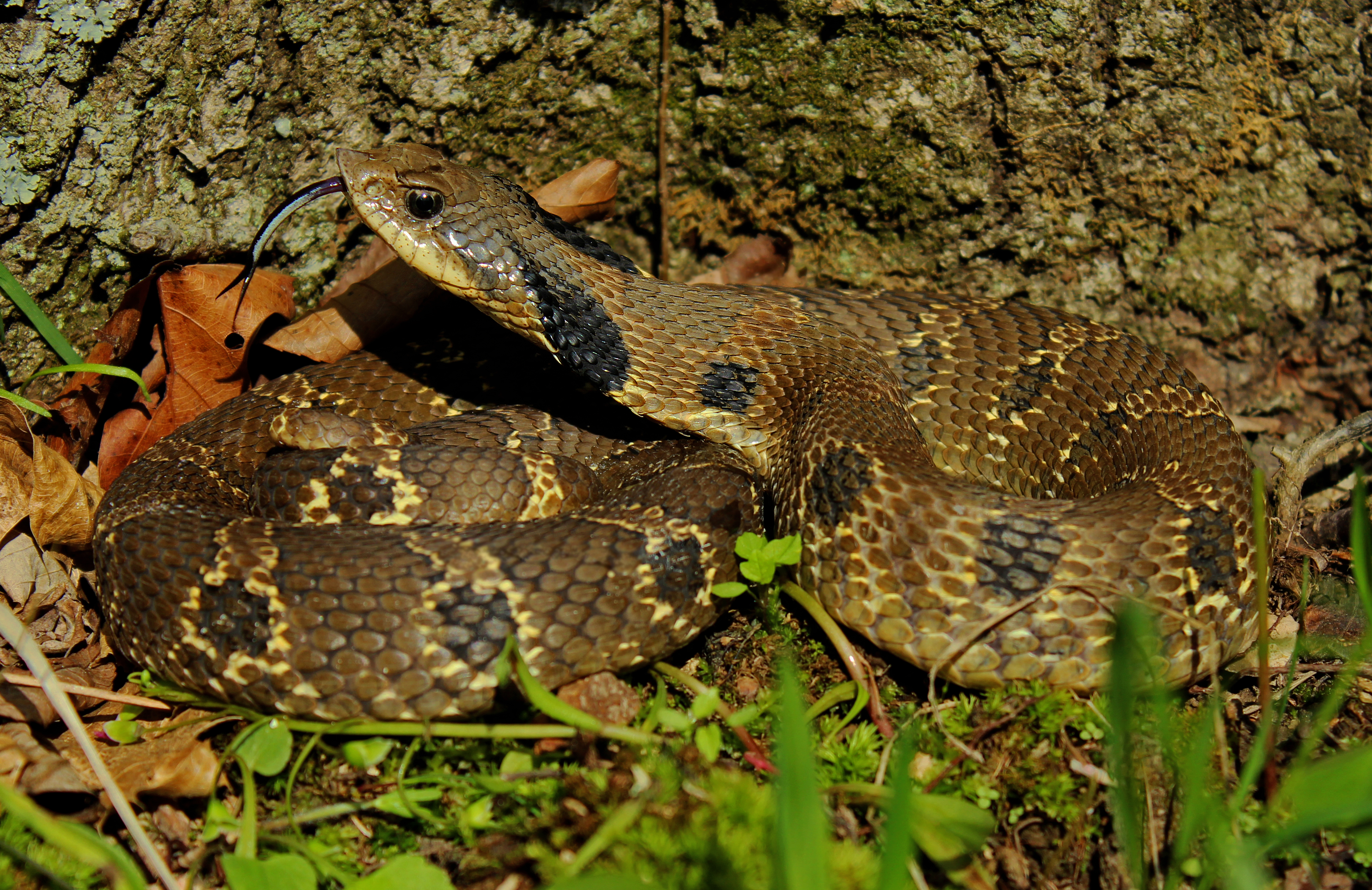
Eastern hog-nosed snake Heterodon platirhinos

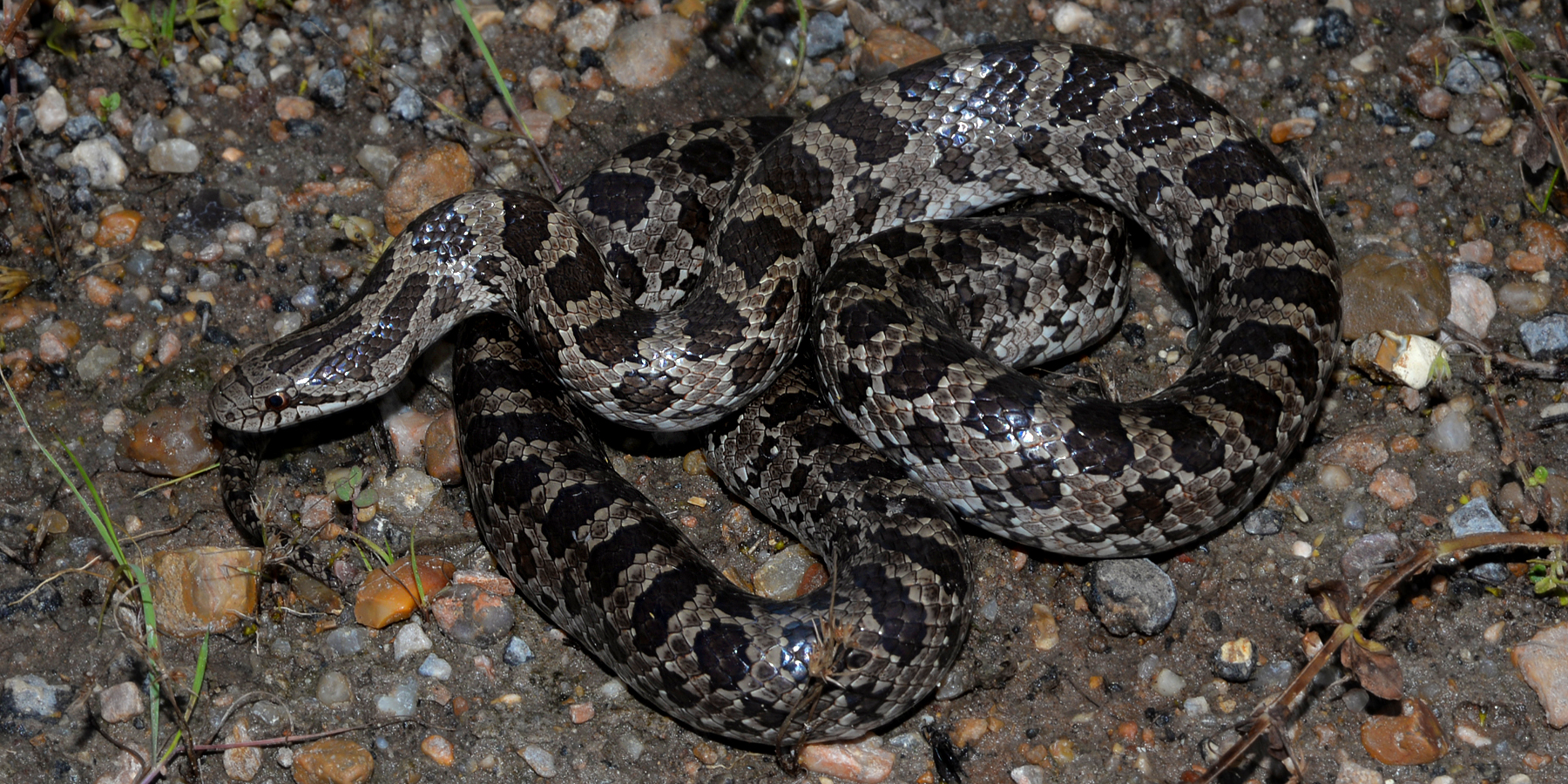
Prairie kingsnake Lampropeltis calligaster

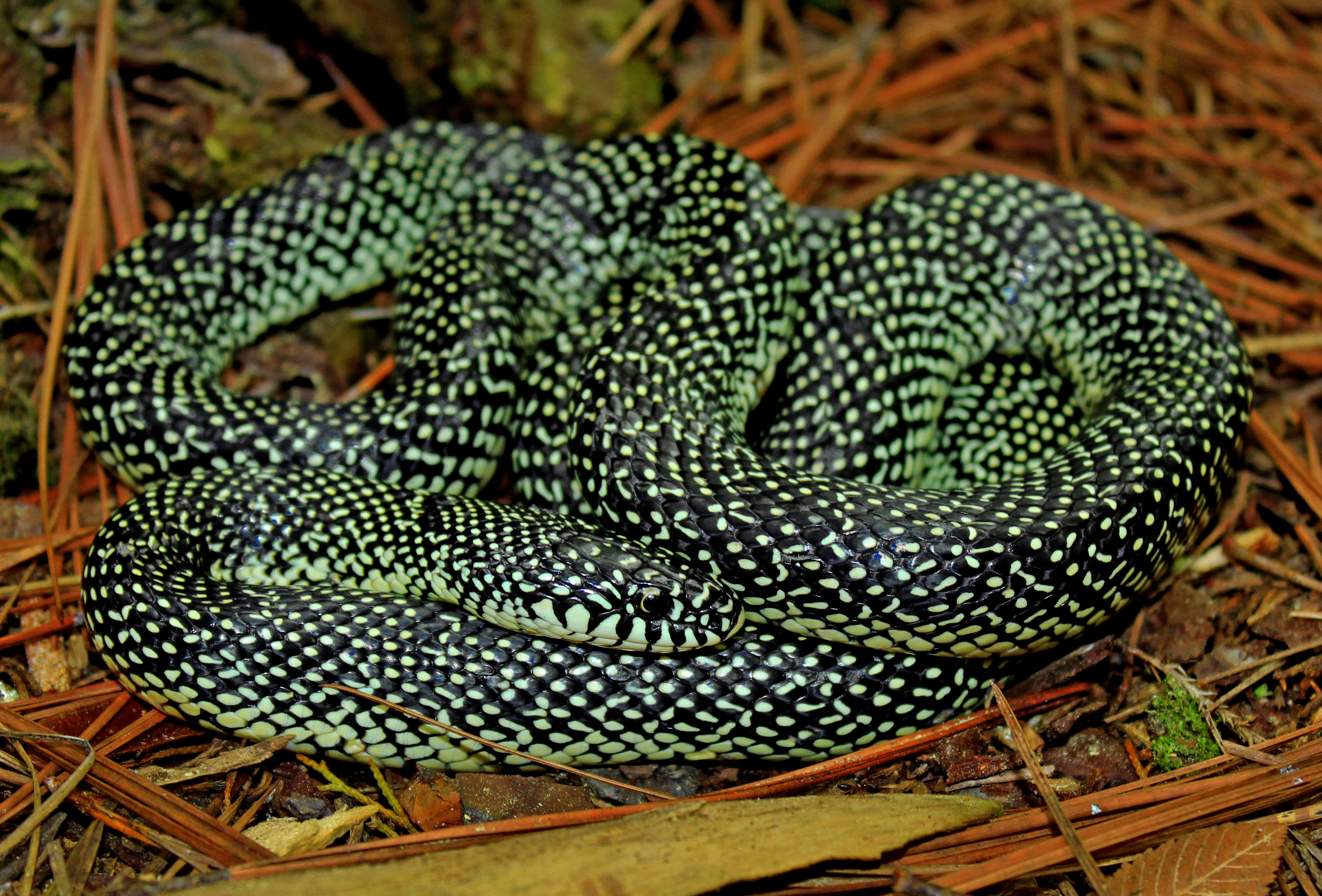
Speckled kingsnake Lampropeltis holbrooki

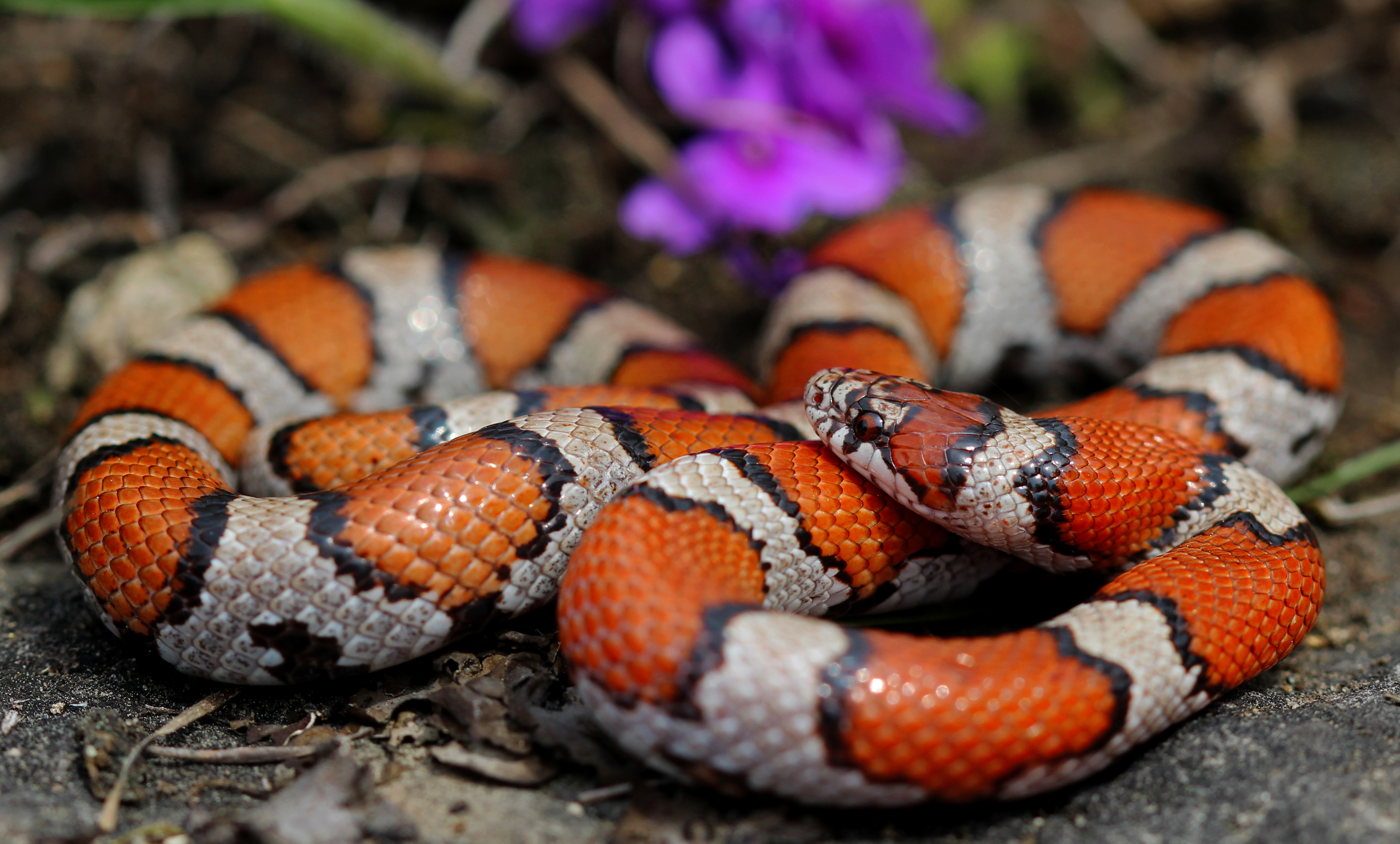
Red milk snake Lampropeltis triangulum syspila

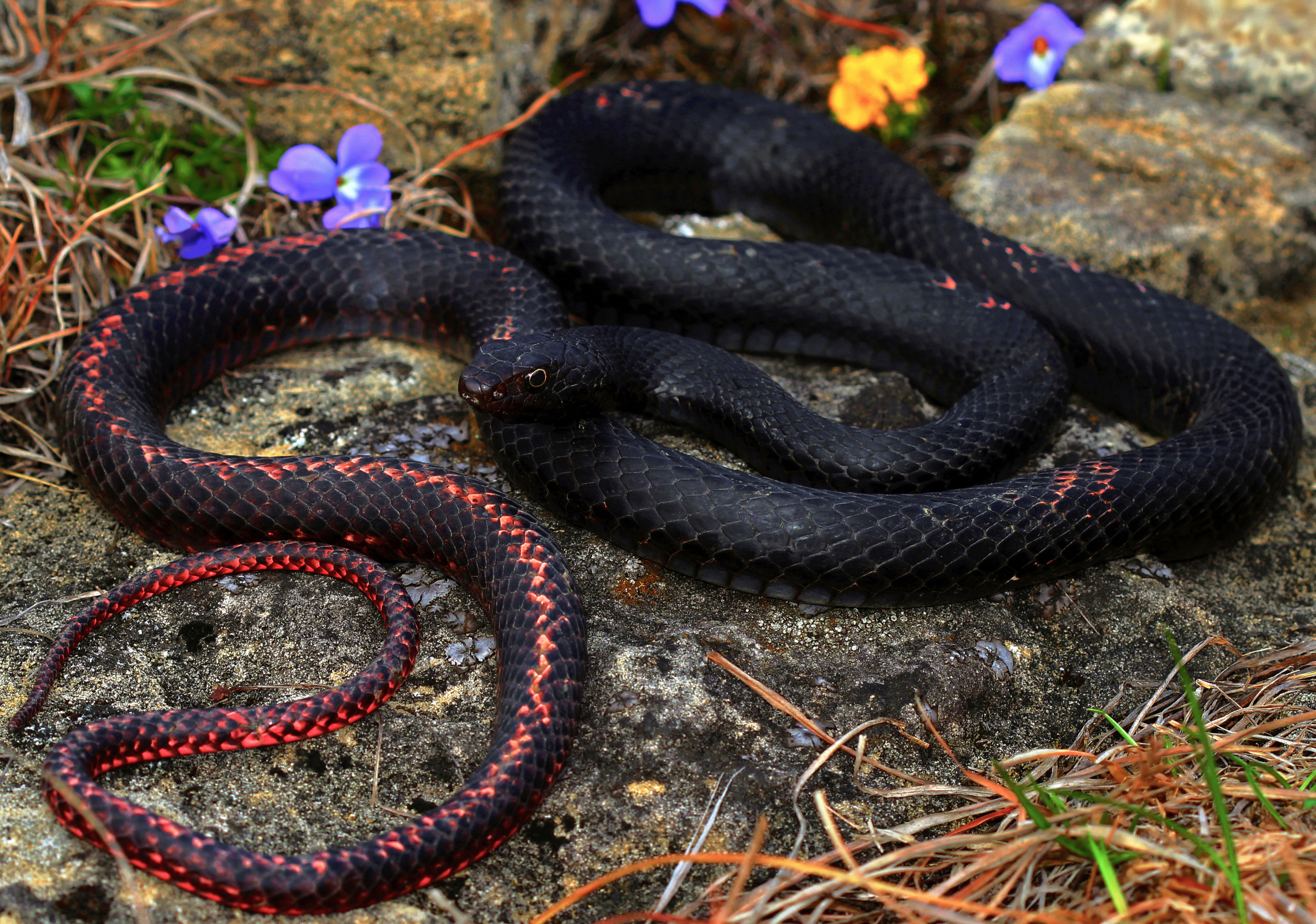
Eastern coachwhip Masticophis flagellum flagellum

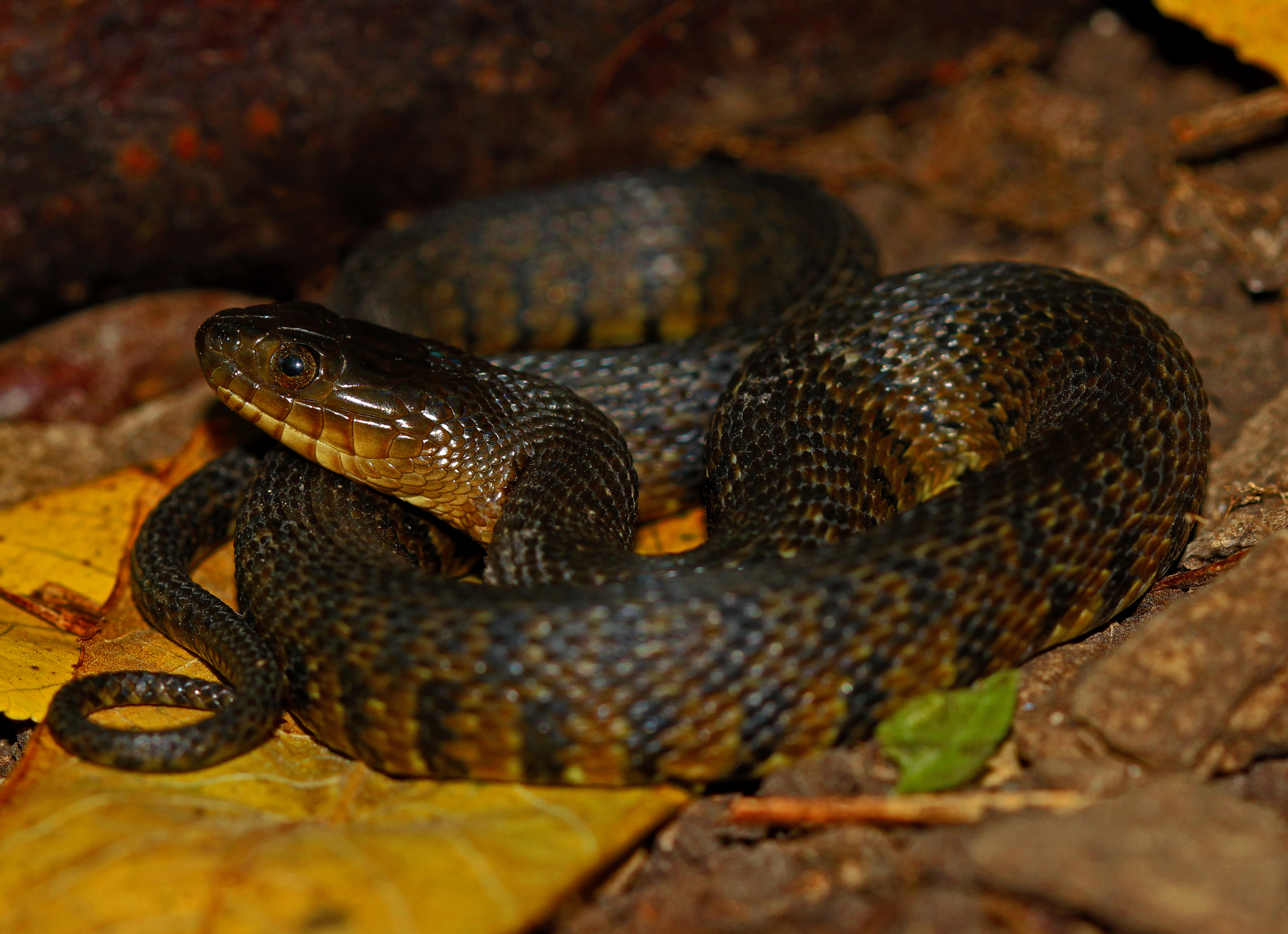
Mississippi green water snake Nerodia cyclopion

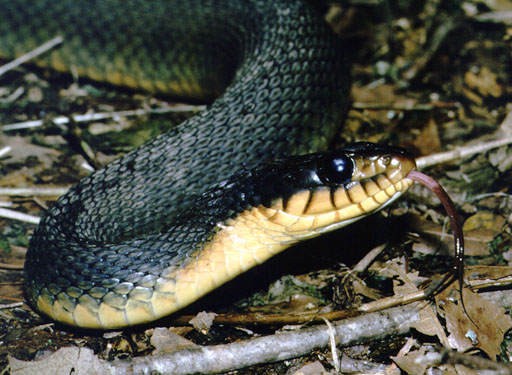
Yellow-bellied water snake Nerodia erythrogaster flavigaster

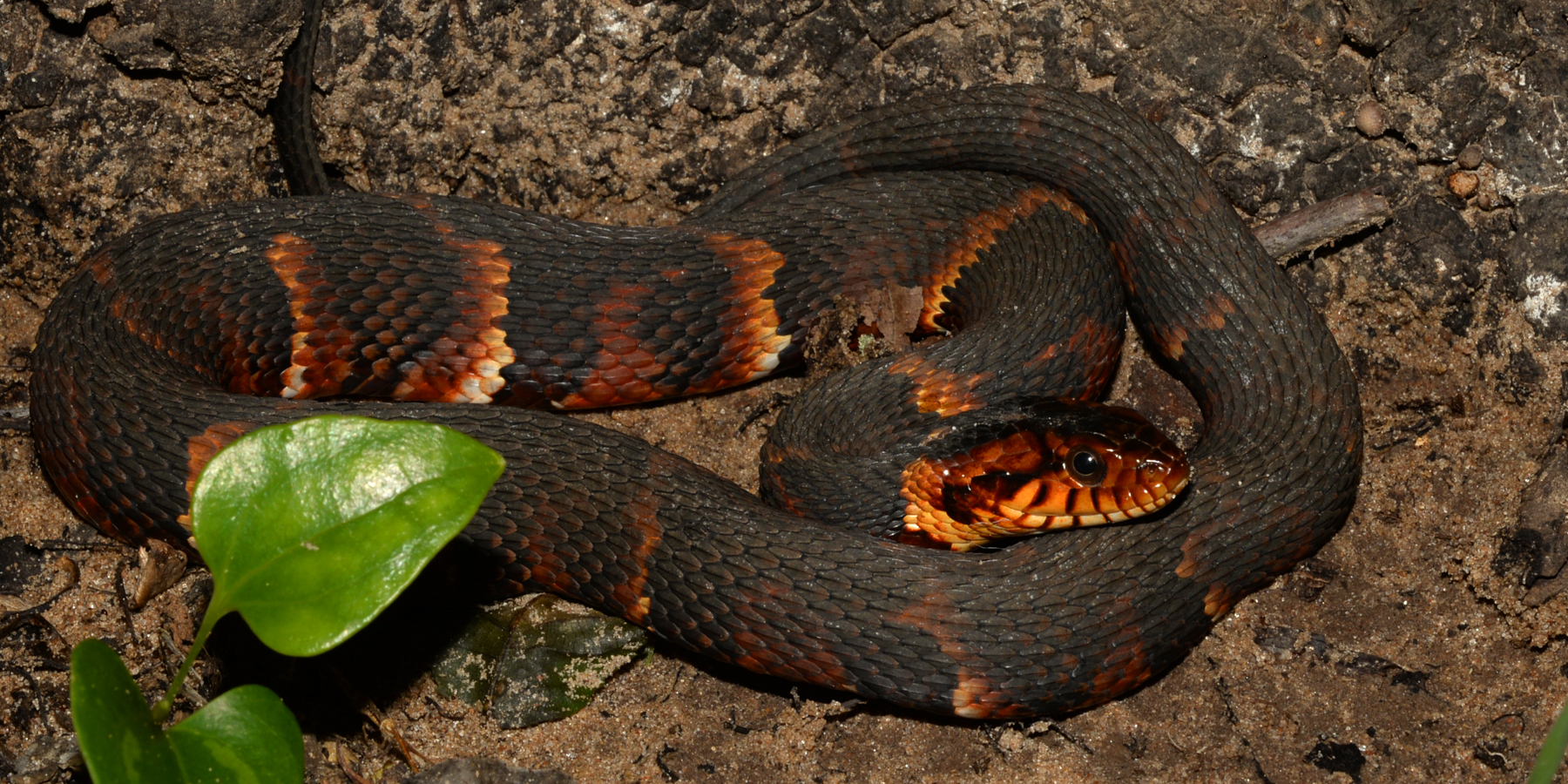
Broad-banded water snake Nerodia fasciata confluens

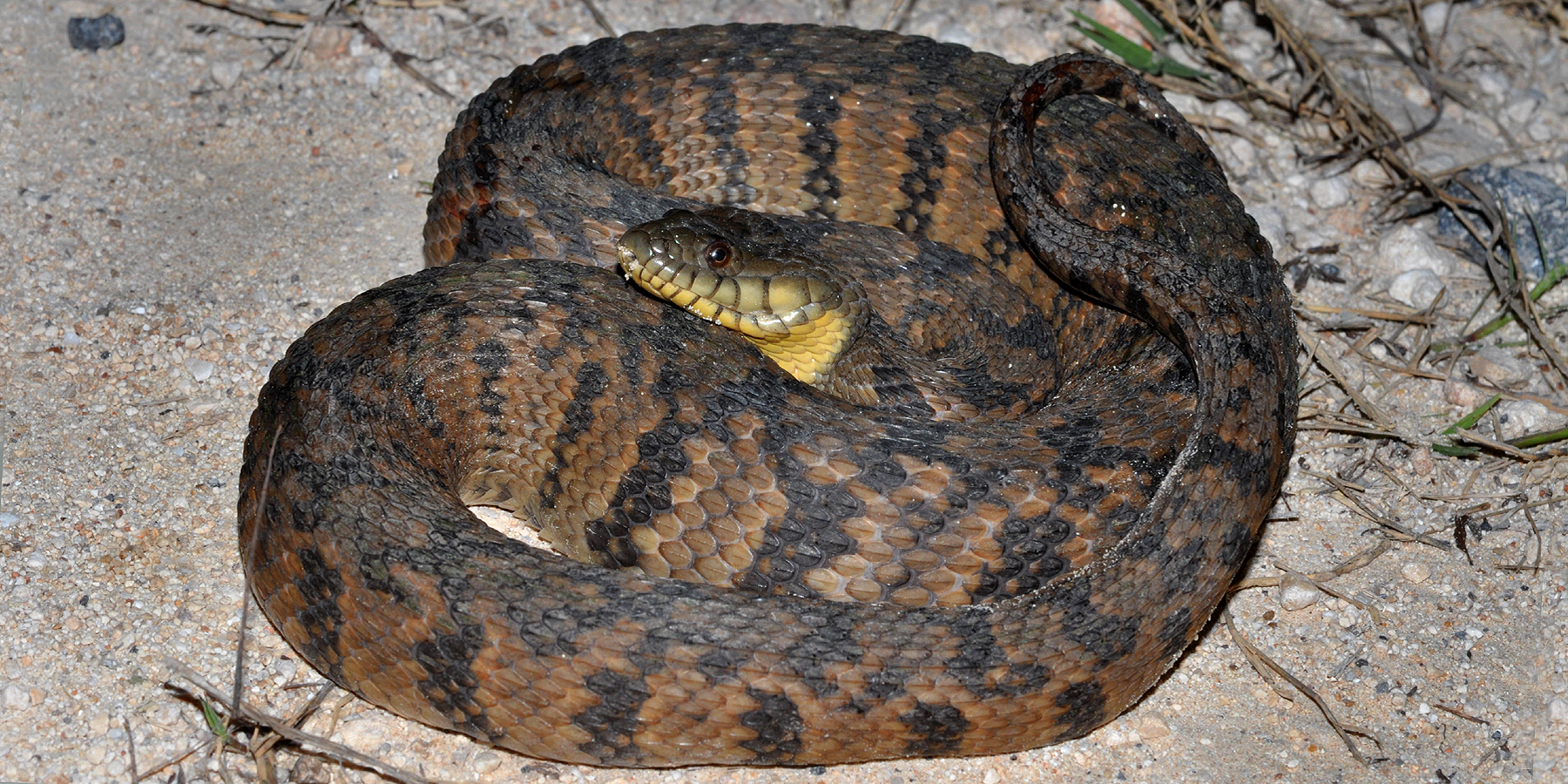
Diamond-backed water snake Nerodia rhombifer rhombifer

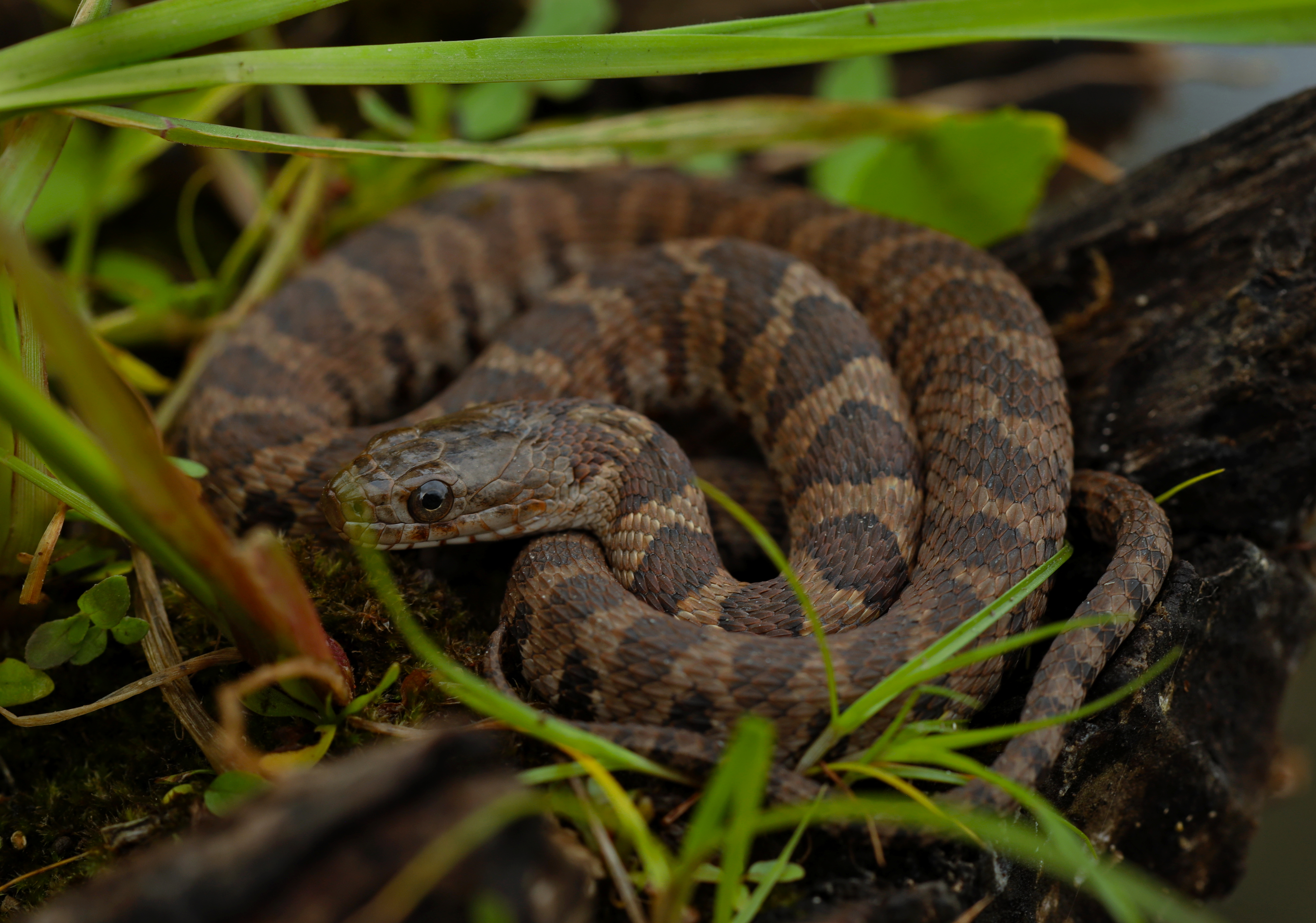
Northern water snake Nerodia sipedon sipedon

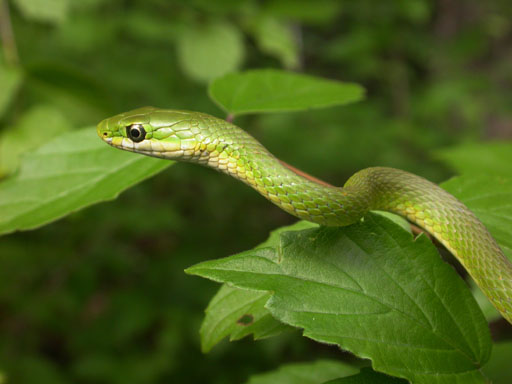
Rough green snake Opheodrys aestivus aestivus

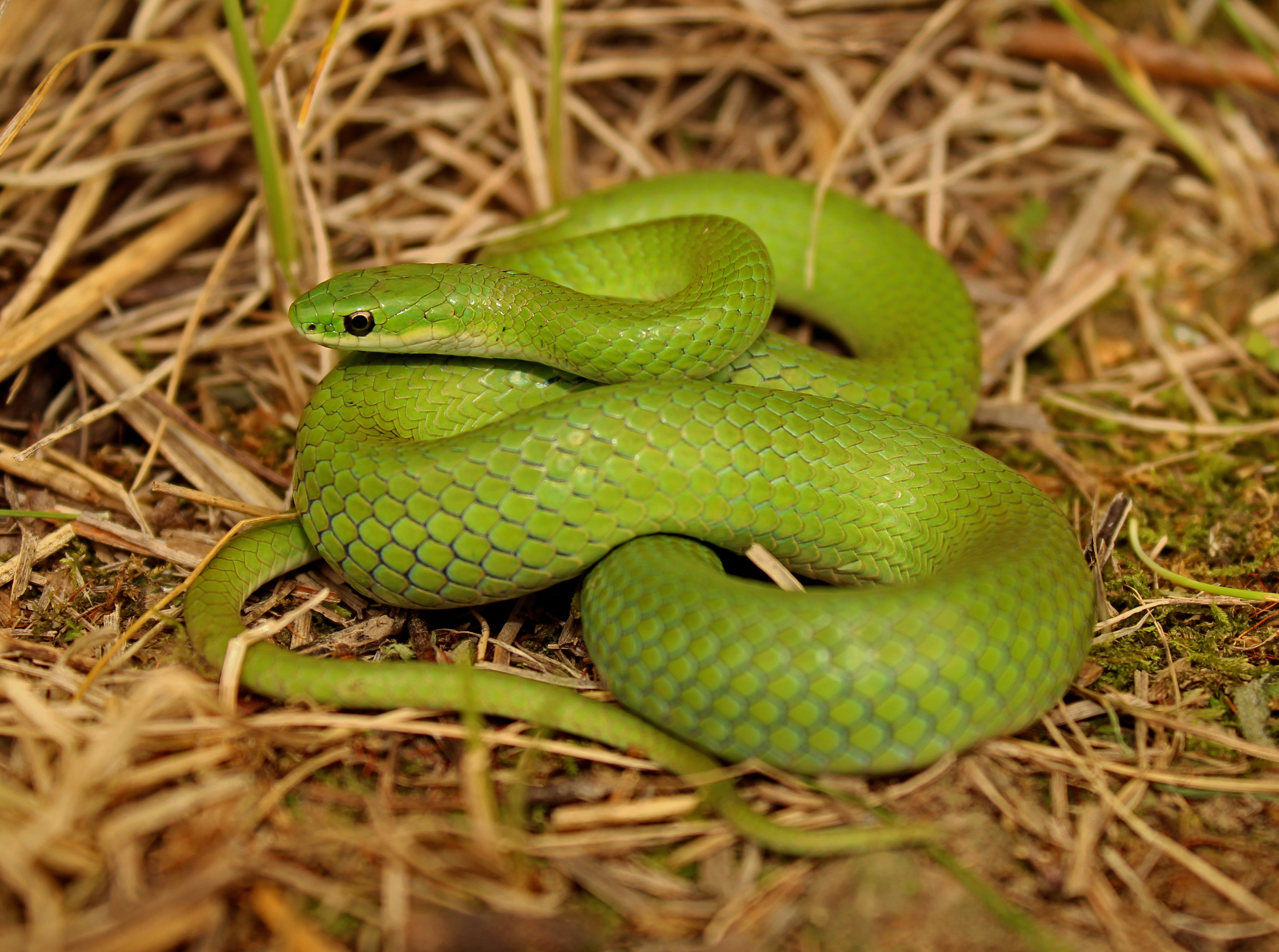
Smooth green snake Opheodrys vernalis

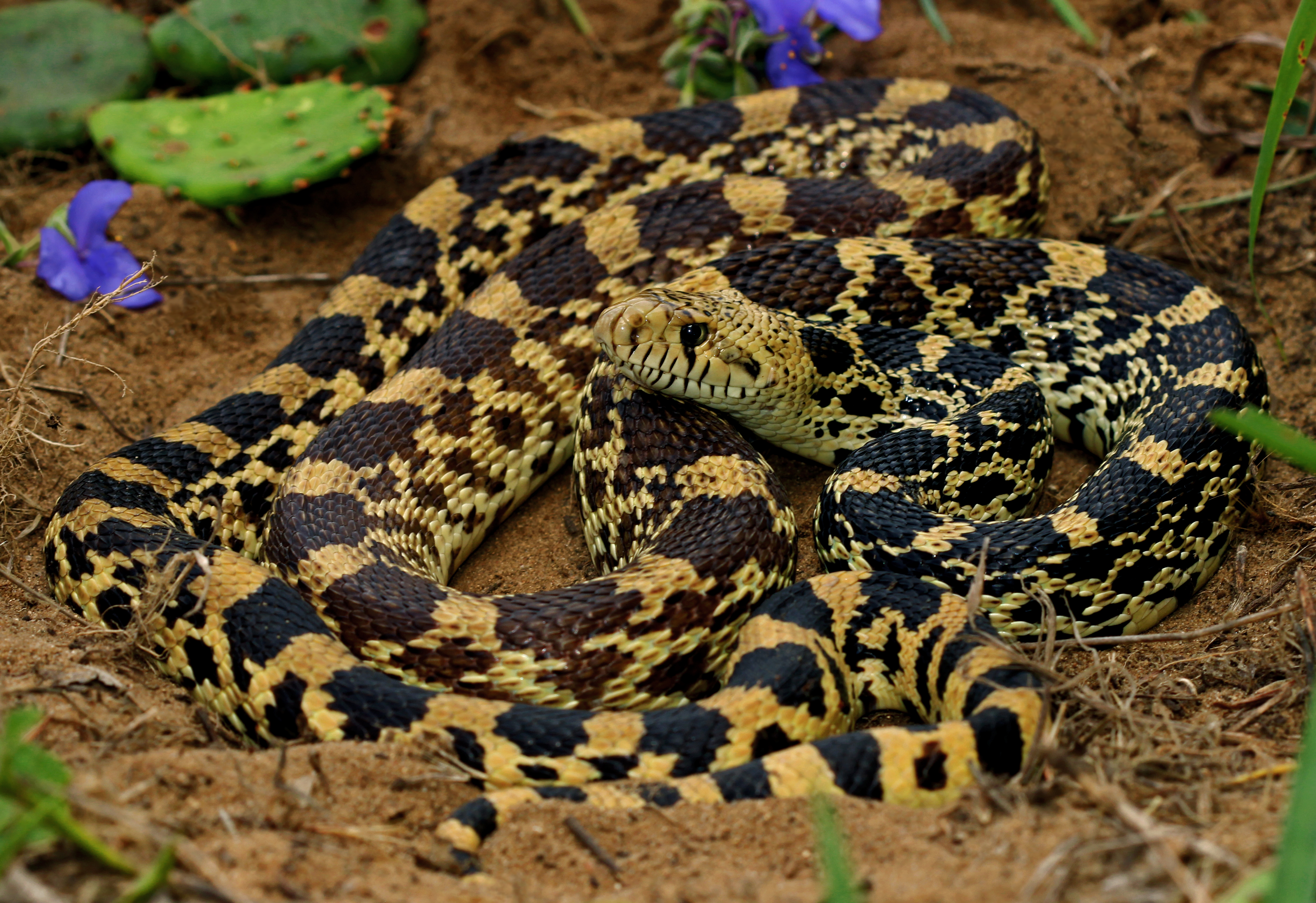
Bullsnake Pituophis catenifer sayi

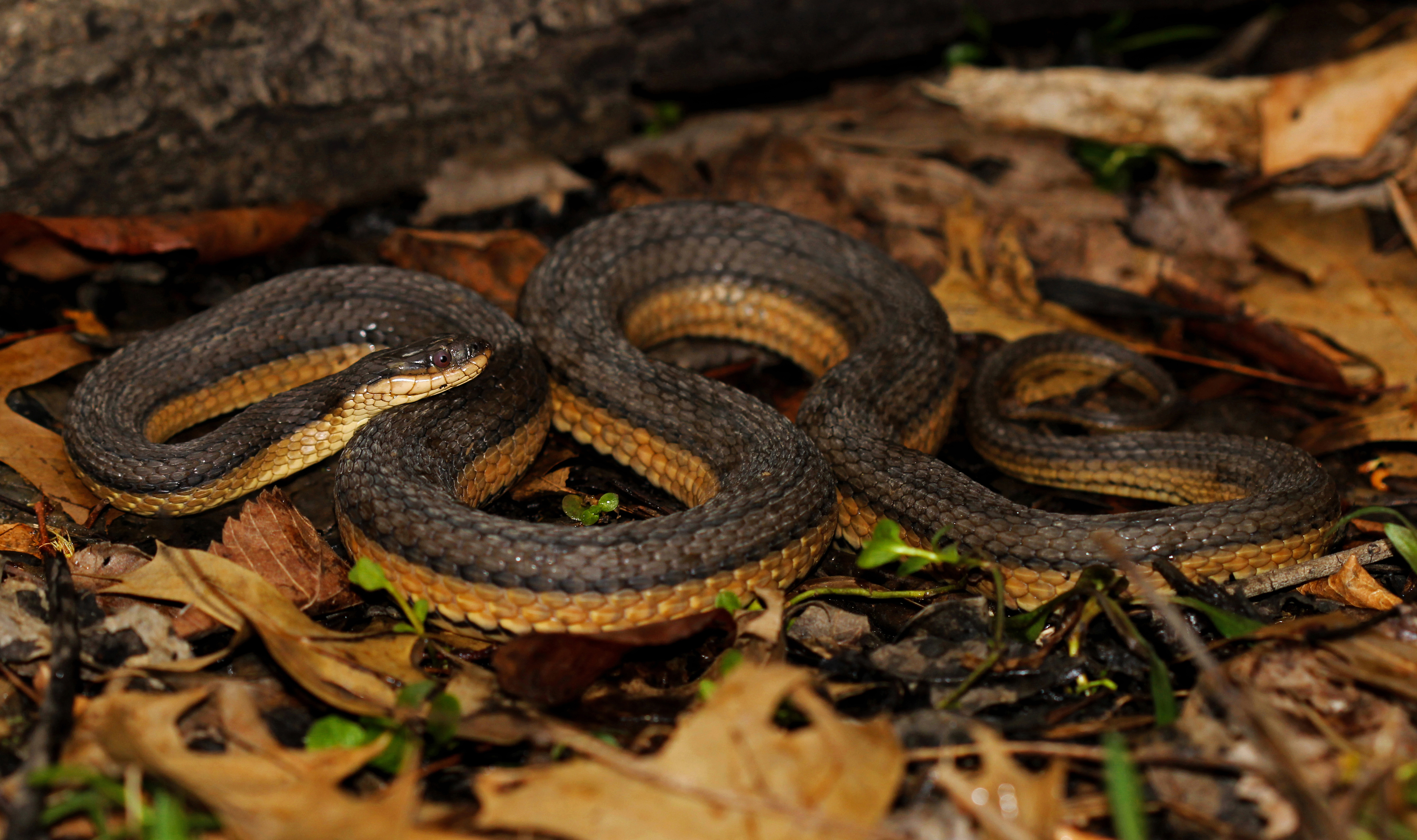
Graham's crayfish snake Regina grahamii

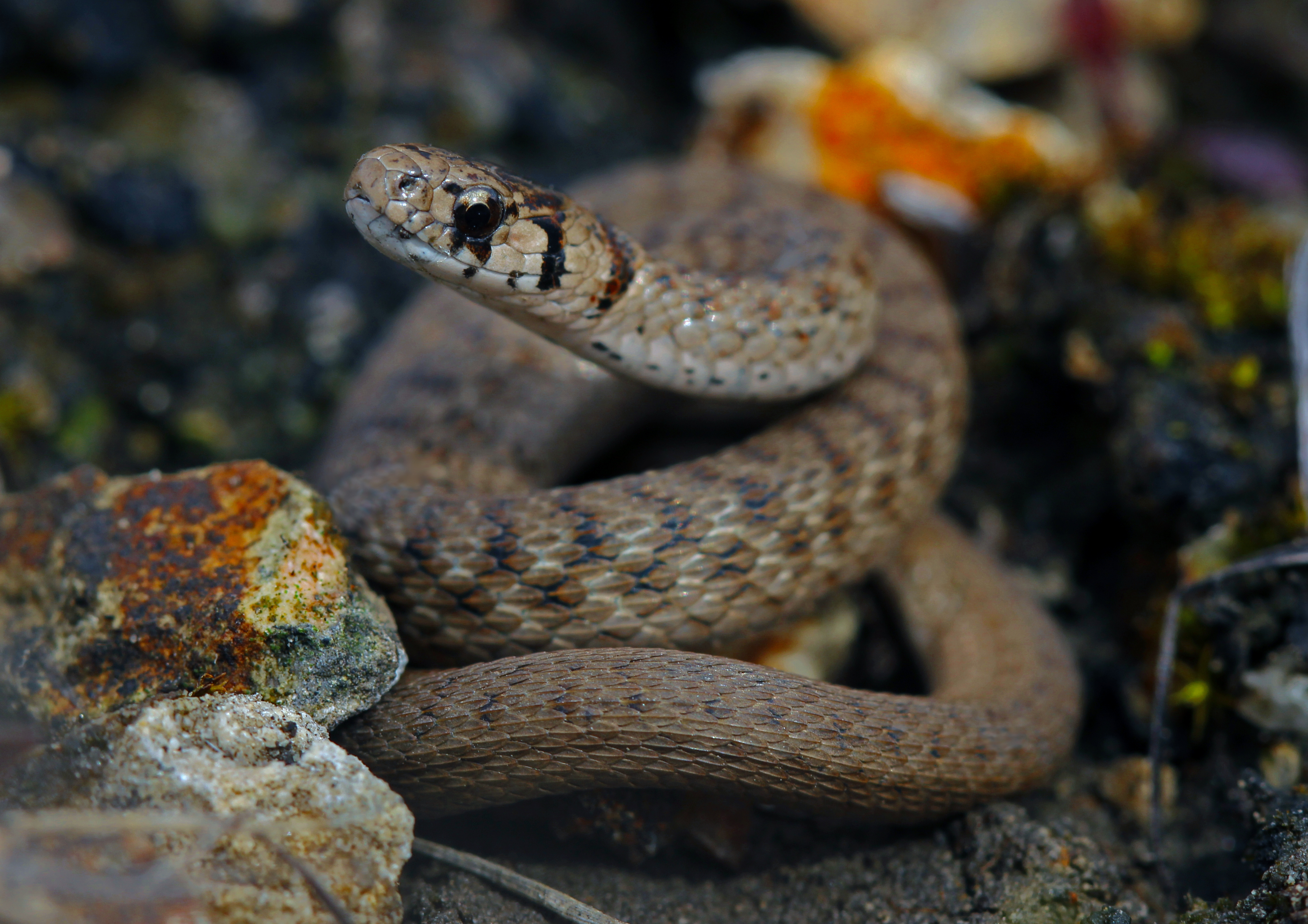
Midland brown snake Storeria dekayi wrightorum

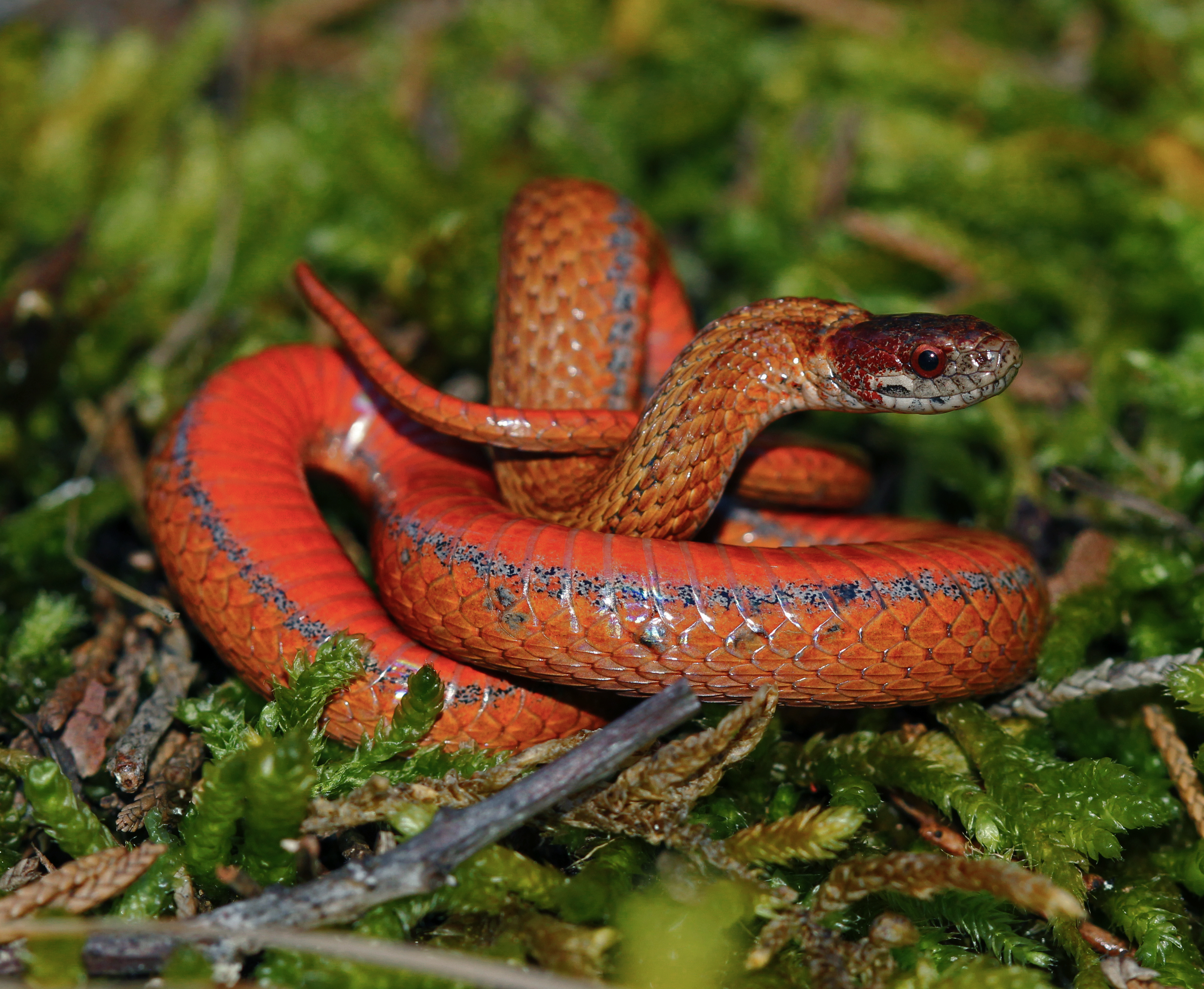
Northern red-bellied snake Storeria occipitomaculata occipitomaculata

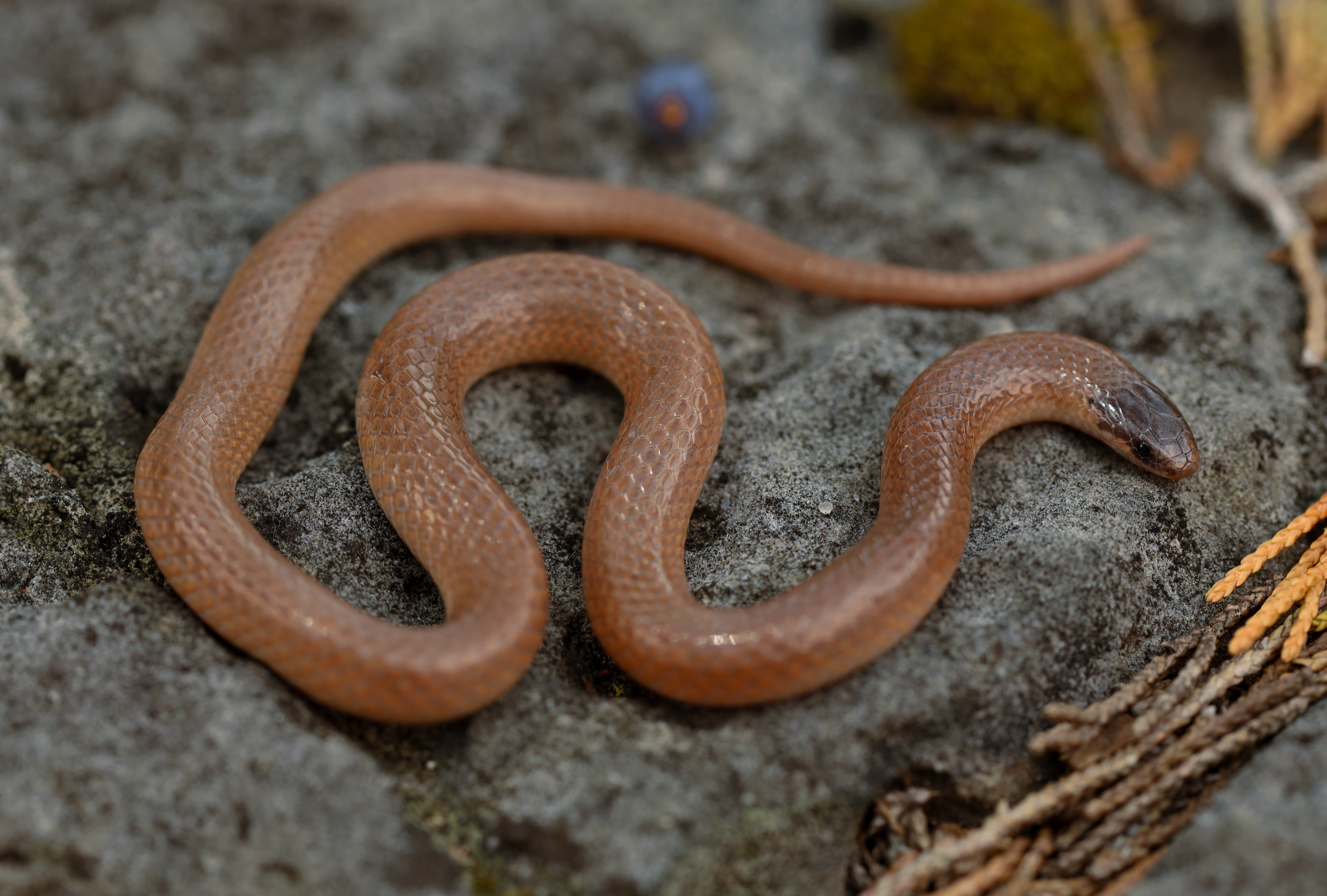
Flat-headed snake Tantilla gracilus

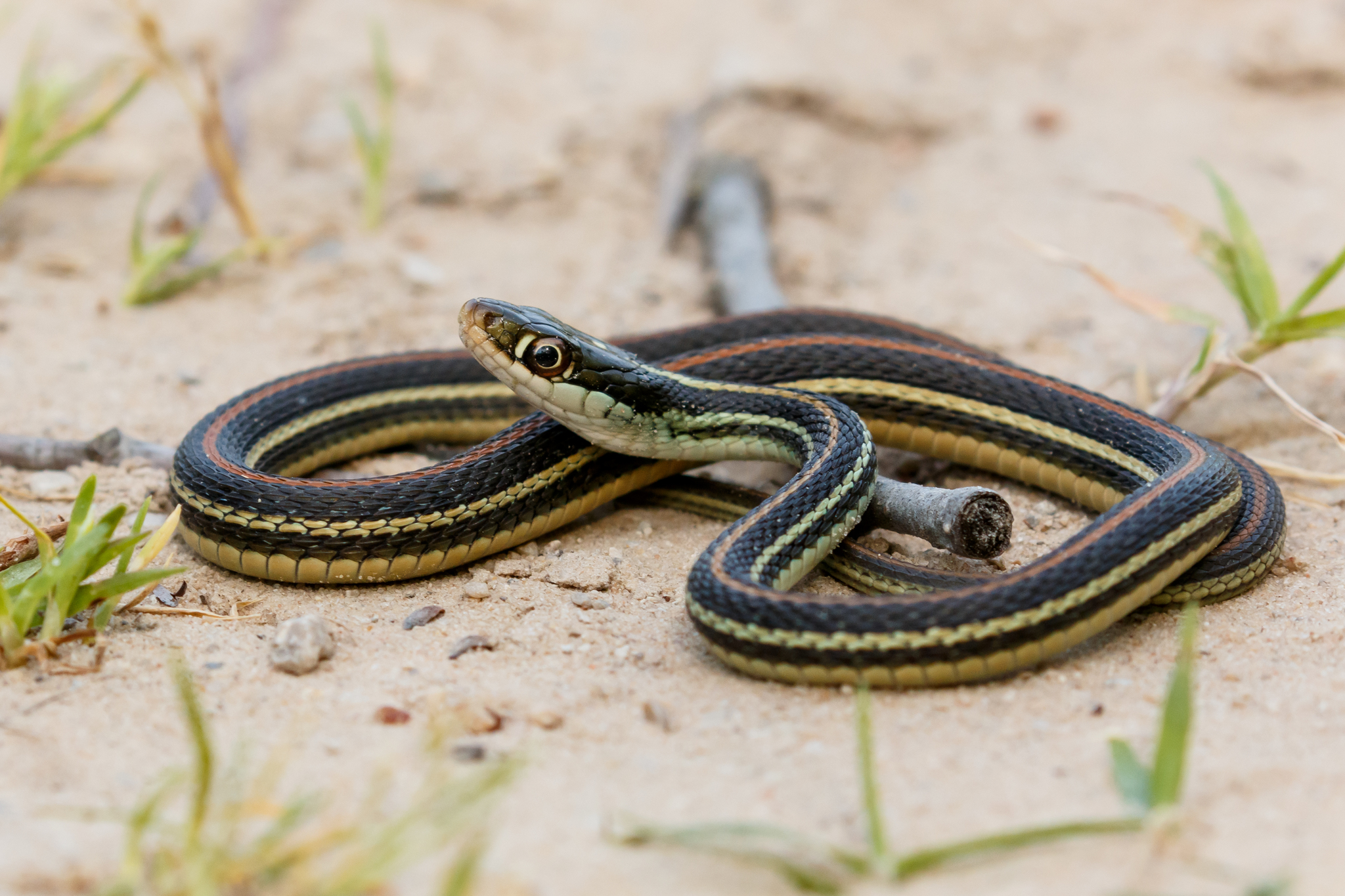
Western ribbon snake Thamnophis proximus proximus

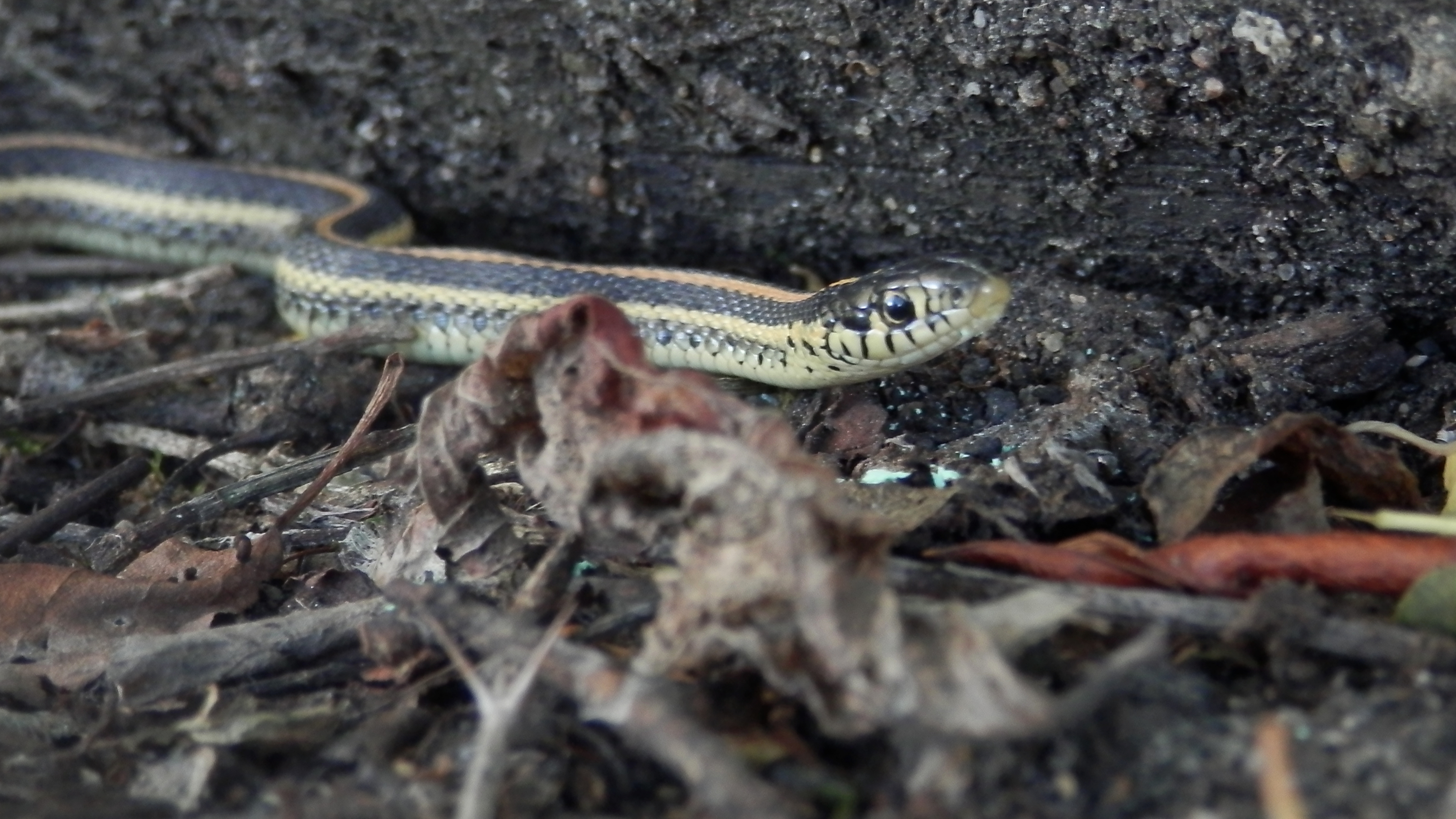
Plains garter snake Thamnophis radix

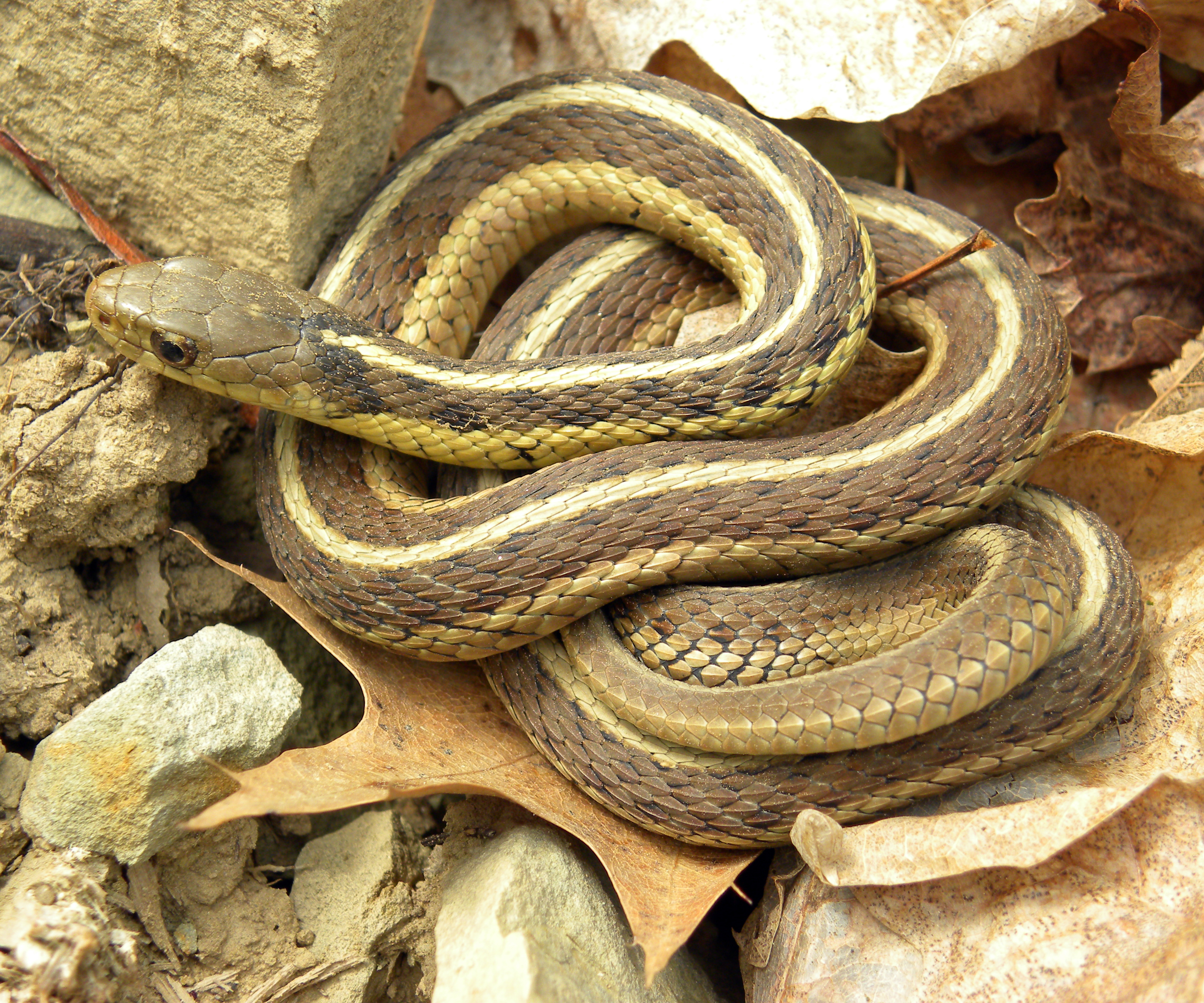
Common garter snake Thamnophis sirtalis

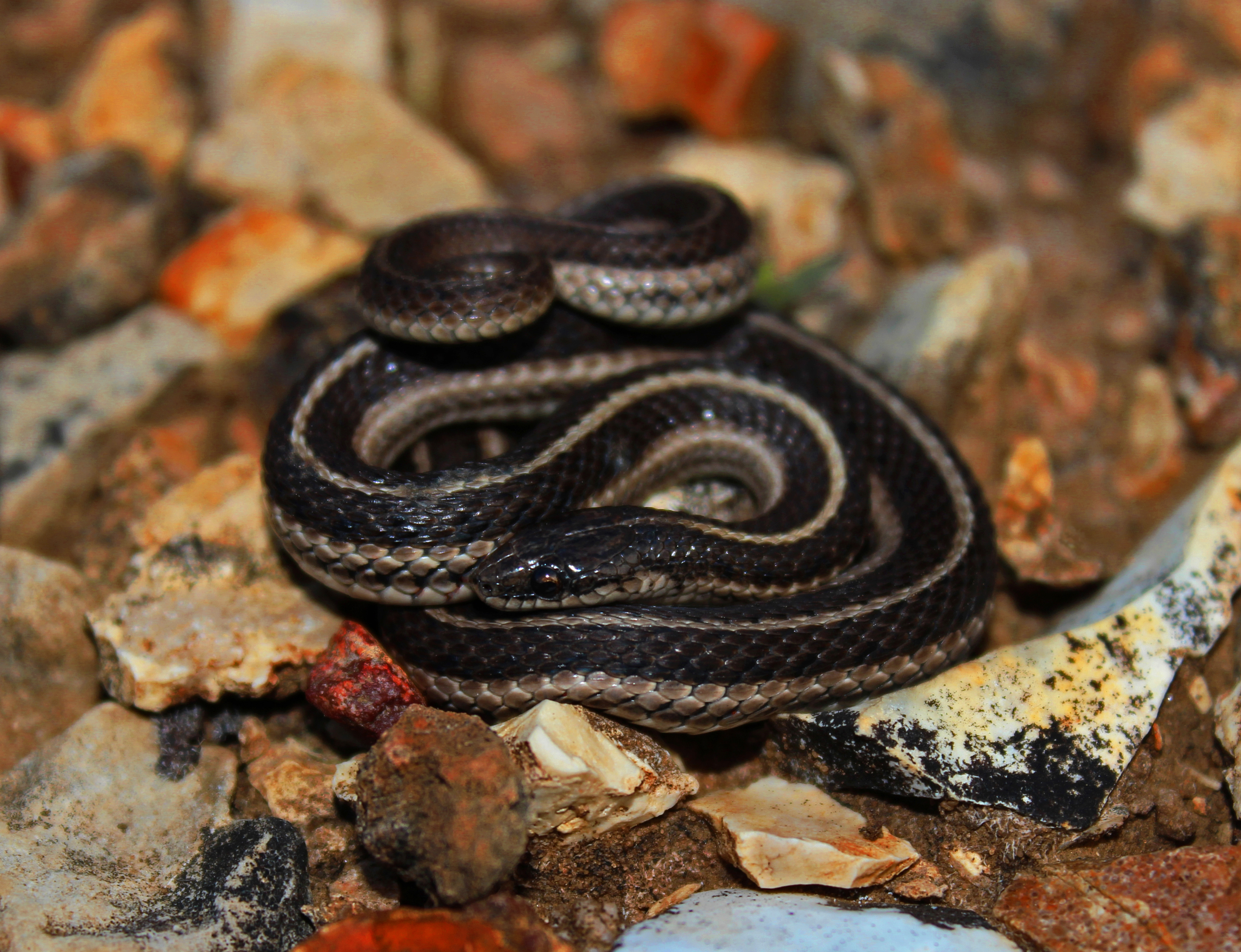
Lined snake Tropidoclonian lineatum

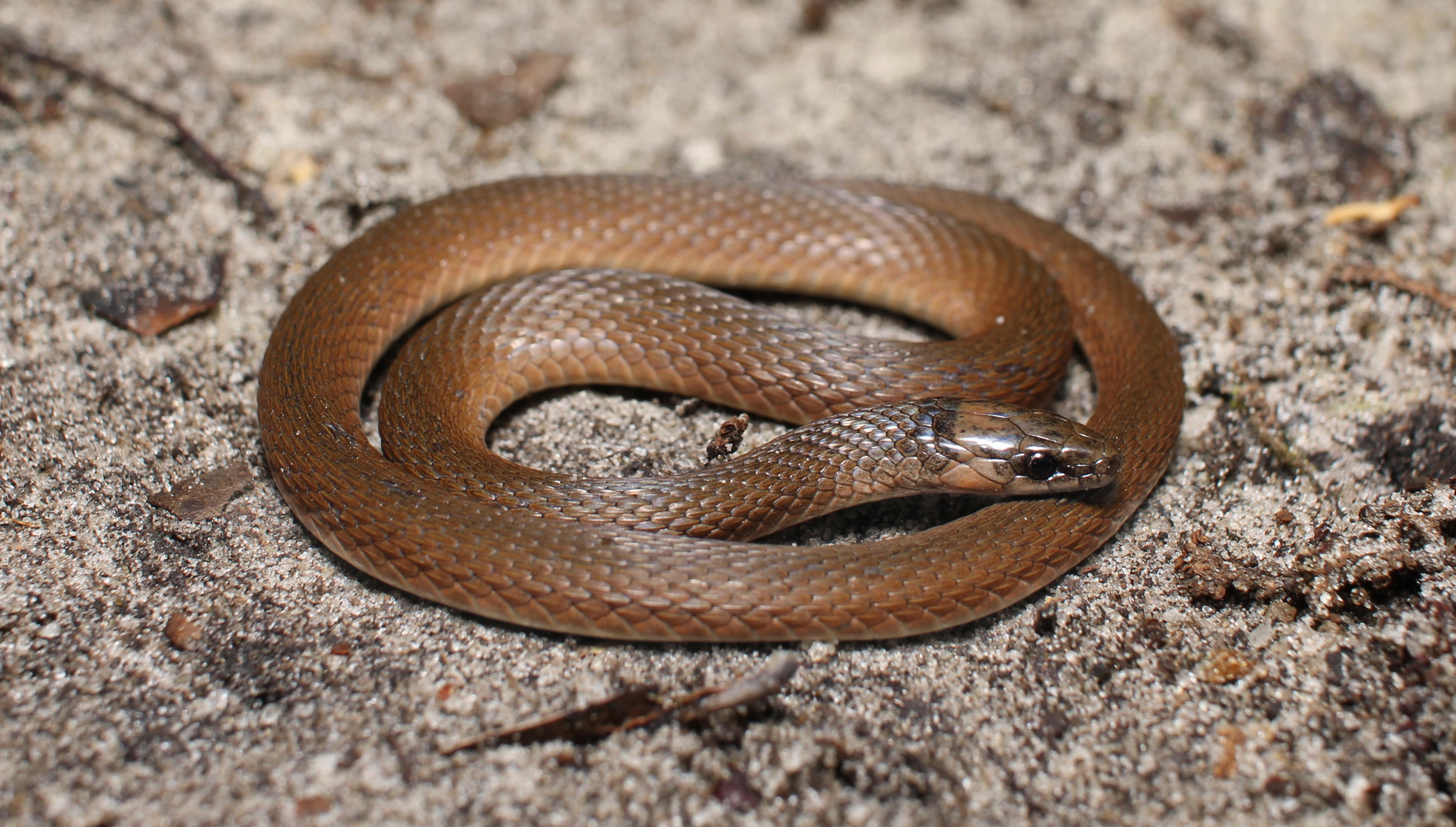
Rough earth snake Virginia striatula

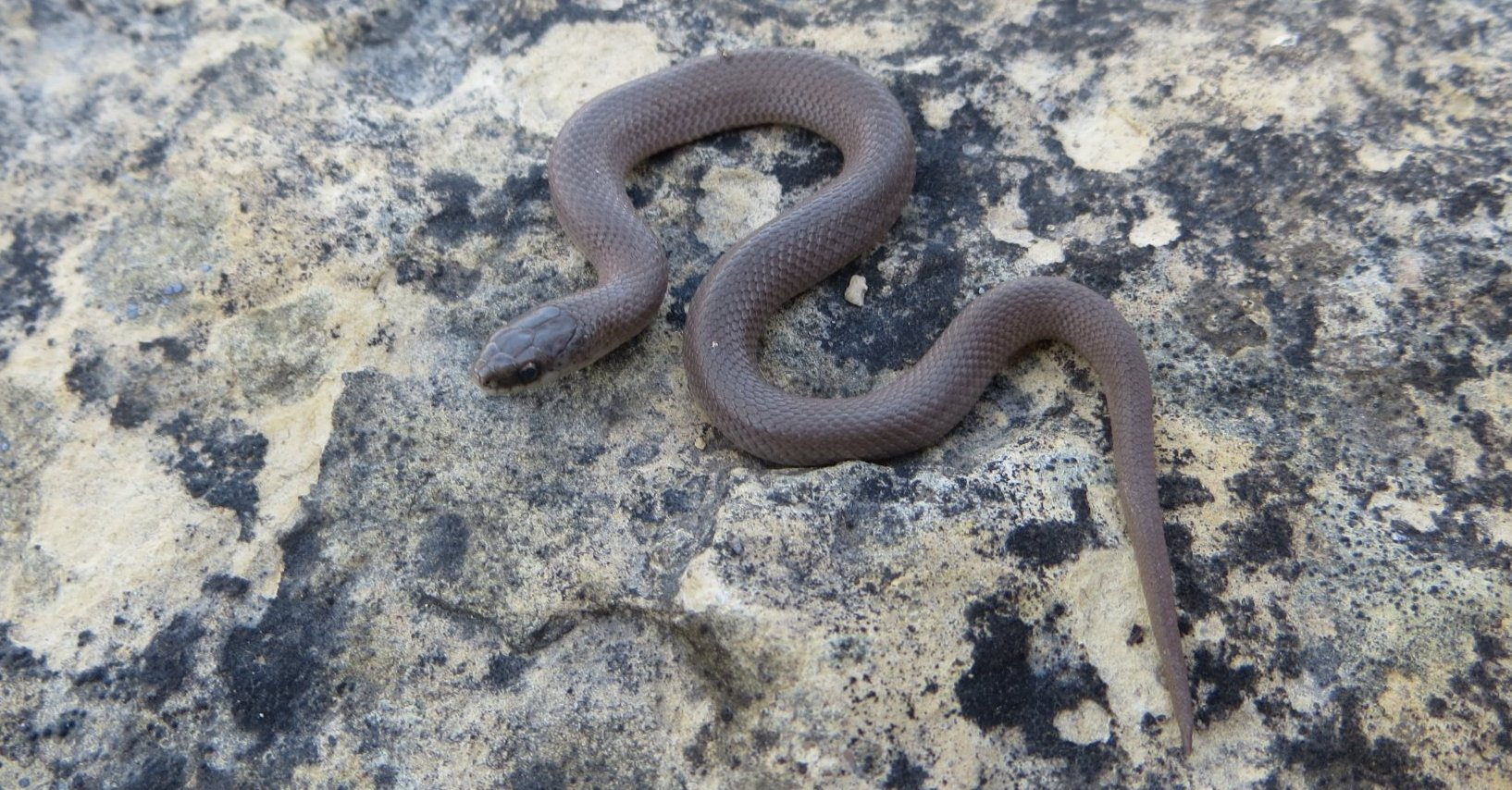
Western earth snake Virginia valeriae elegans

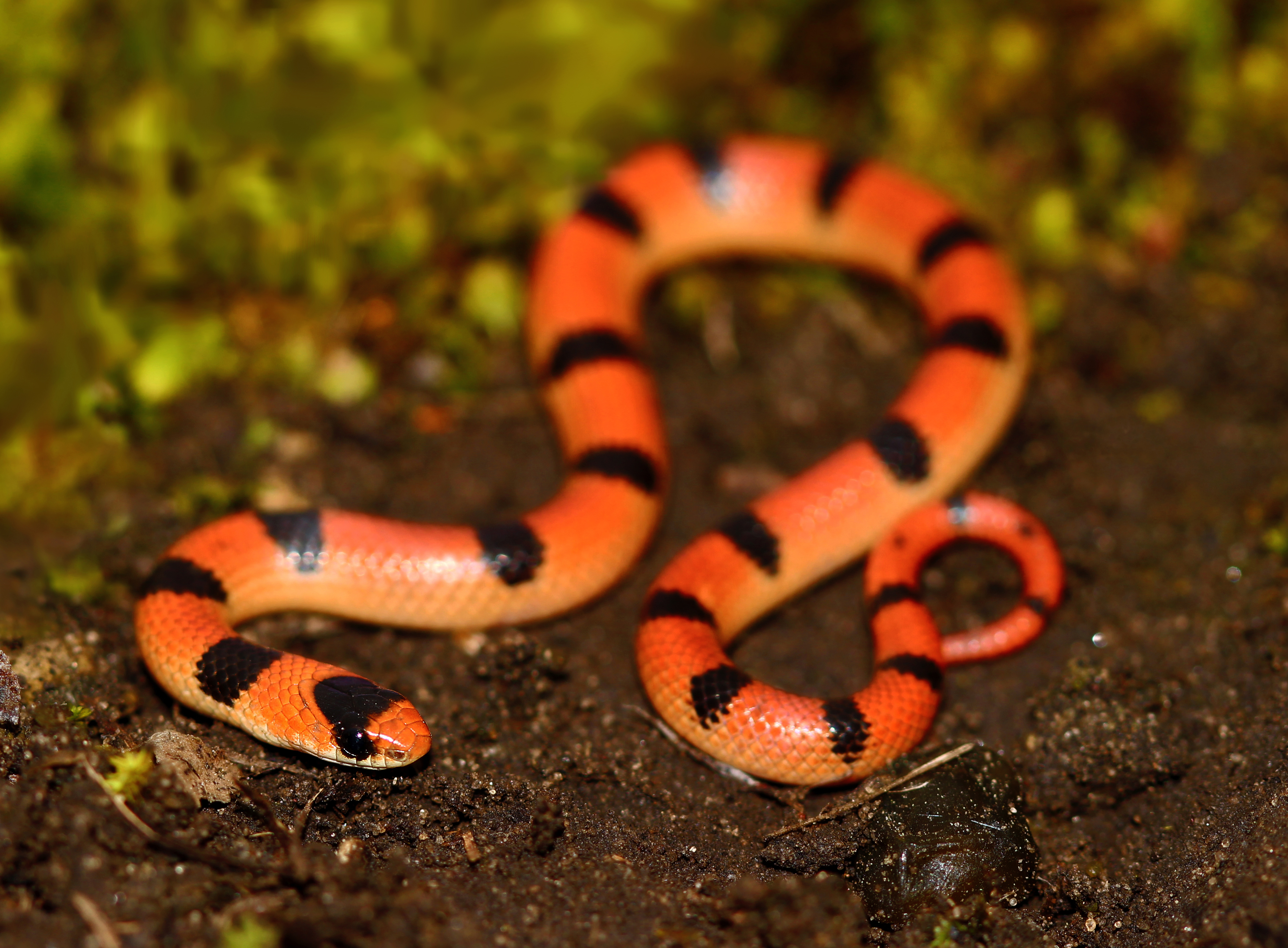
Great Plains ground snake Sonora episcopa

== Venomous snakes ==
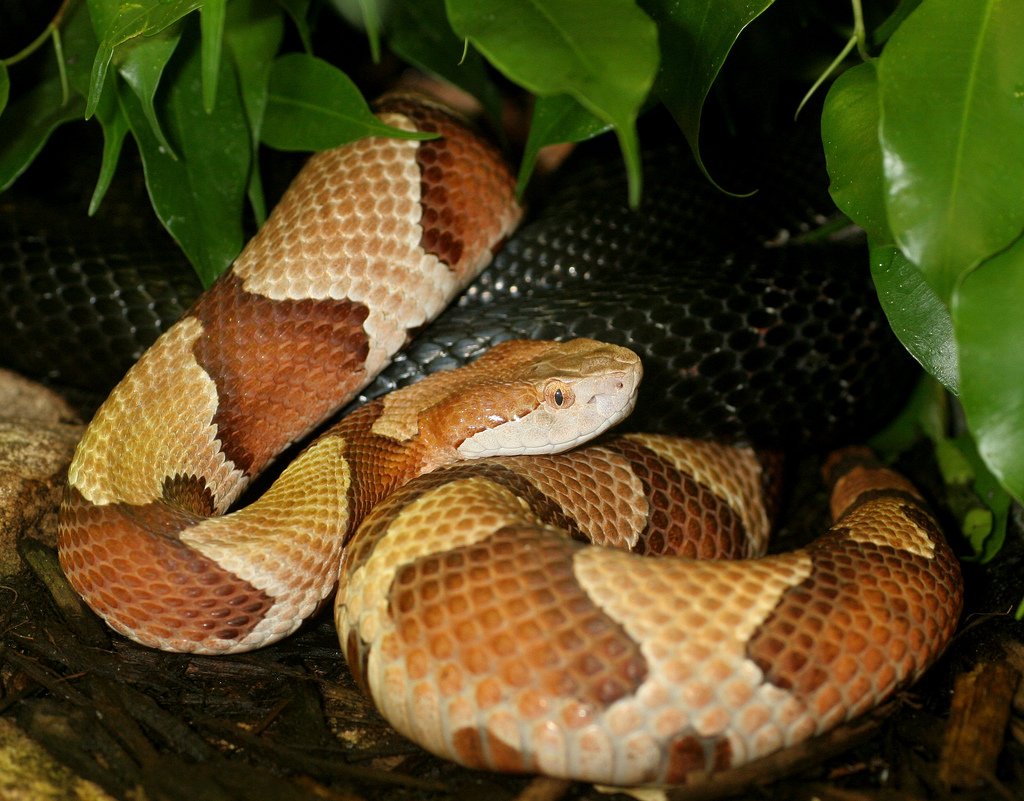
Eastern copperhead Agkistrodon contortrix

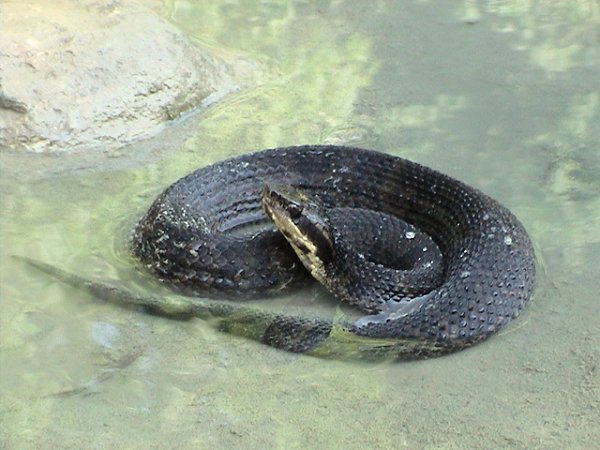
Northern cottonmouth Agkistrodon piscivorus

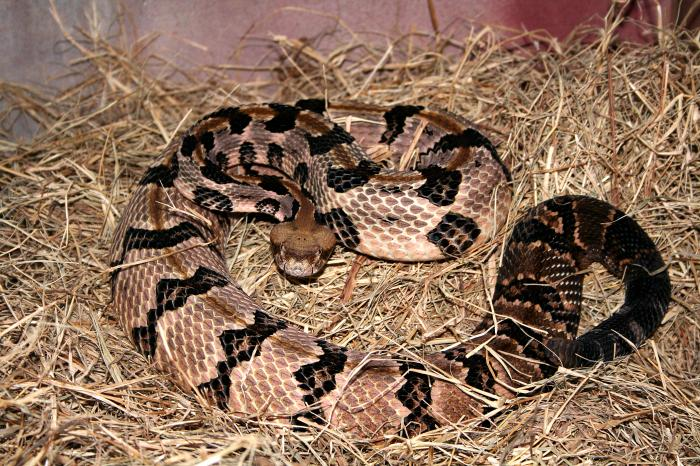
Timber rattlesnake Crotalus horridus

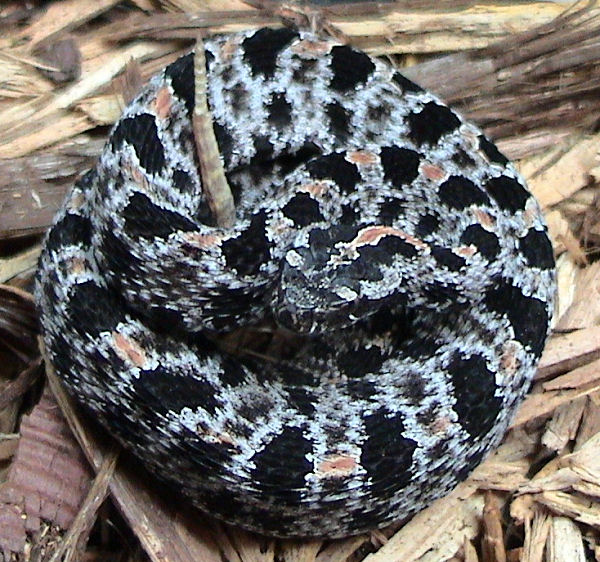
Western pygmy rattlesnake Sistrurus miliarius streckeri

Eastern massasauga Sistrurus catenatus
