= John Kelsey =

John Kelsey may refer to:

- John Kelsey (American football), see 1974 NFL draft
- John Kelsey (artist), American art critic, writer and dealer
- John Kelsey (cricketer) (1867-1945), English cricketer
- John Kelsey (cryptanalyst), an American cryptanalyst
