= Riverview Estates, Missouri =

- Village
- Location within Missouri
- Coordinates: 38°44′56″N 94°31′29″W
- Country: United States
- State: Missouri
- County: Cass

Area
  - Total: 0.24 sq mi (0.62 km^{2})
  - Land: 0.24 sq mi (0.62 km^{2})
  - Water: 0 sq mi (0.00 km^{2})
- Elevation: 925 ft (282 m)

Population (2020)
  - Total: 78
  - Density: 325.1/sq mi (125.52/km^{2})
- Time zone: UTC-6 (Central (CST))
  - Summer (DST): UTC-5 (CDT)
- ZIP code: 64012
- Area code: 816
- FIPS code: 29-62210
- GNIS feature ID: 2417410

Riverview Estates is a village in Cass County, Missouri, United States. The population was 78 at the 2020 census. It is part of the Kansas City metropolitan area.

== Geography ==
The village is located in northwestern Cass County at 38°44′55″N 94°31′34″W. It is part of the Kansas City Metropolitan Area and is 4 miles (6 km) south of Belton and 6 miles (10 km) northwest of Peculiar. The West Fork of East Creek flows through the eastern part of the village.

According to the United States Census Bureau, the village has a total area of 0.24 square miles (0.62 km^{2}), all land.

== Demographics ==
Historical population
Census	Pop.	Note	%±
2010	82		—
2020	78		−4.9%
U.S. Decennial Census

=== Racial and ethnic composition ===
Riverview Estates village, Missouri – Racial and ethnic composition Note: the US Census treats Hispanic/Latino as an ethnic category. This table excludes Latinos from the racial categories and assigns them to a separate category. Hispanics/Latinos may be of any race.
Race / Ethnicity (NH = Non-Hispanic)	Pop 2010	Pop 2020	% 2010	% 2020
White alone (NH)	78	68	95.12%	87.18%
Black or African American alone (NH)	0	2	0.00%	2.56%
Native American or Alaska Native alone (NH)	0	0	0.00%	0.00%
Asian alone (NH)	0	0	0.00%	0.00%
Native Hawaiian or Pacific Islander alone (NH)	0	0	0.00%	0.00%
Other race alone (NH)	0	0	0.00%	0.00%
Mixed race or Multiracial (NH)	3	6	3.66%	7.69%
Hispanic or Latino (any race)	1	2	1.22%	2.56%
Total	82	78	100.00%	100.00%

== Education ==
Belton School District is the local school district. Its comprehensive high school is Belton High School.

Metropolitan Community College has the Belton school district in its taxation area.
