= Loch Lloyd, Missouri =

- Village
- Location of Loch Lloyd in Missouri
- Coordinates: 38°49′52″N 94°35′52″W
- Country: United States
- State: Missouri
- County: Cass
- Incorporated: September 4, 2003

Area
  - Total: 1.90 sq mi (4.91 km^{2})
  - Land: 1.74 sq mi (4.51 km^{2})
  - Water: 0.15 sq mi (0.40 km^{2})
- Elevation: 994 ft (303 m)

Population (2020)
  - Total: 863
  - Density: 495.8/sq mi (191.43/km^{2})
- Time zone: UTC-6 (Central (CST))
  - Summer (DST): UTC-5 (CDT)
- ZIP code: 64012
- Area code: 816
- FIPS code: 29-43468
- GNIS feature ID: 2375515
- Website: www.villageoflochlloyd.com

The Village of Loch Lloyd is a private gated resort-like community in northwestern Cass County, Missouri, United States, which lies adjacent the Kansas border on the south side of the Kansas City metropolitan area. As of the 2020 census, Loch Lloyd had a population of 863. It incorporated on September 3, 2003.

The village of Loch Lloyd is built around a 110-acre lake on Mill Creek (a tributary of the Blue River) and the original golf course designed by Donald Sechrest and the newly designed Tom Watson Signature Design golf course which opened in 2012. Loch Lloyd derives its name from the original real estate developer Harry J. Lloyd, who died in 1997.

In 2002, the development at Loch Lloyd and The Country Club at Loch Lloyd were acquired by FiveStar Lifestyles. This company has built over 200 homes at an average price of $850,000.

The original golf course was designed by Donald Sechrest and opened in 1991. The Country Club at Loch Lloyd hosted a Senior PGA Tour tournament from 1991 to 1998.

== Geography ==
The ZIP code of 64012 is shared with Belton.

According to the United States Census Bureau, the village has a total area of 1.91 square miles (4.95 km^{2}), of which 1.75 square miles (4.53 km^{2}) is land and 0.16 square miles (0.41 km^{2}) is water.

== Demographics ==
Historical population
Census	Pop.	Note	%±
2010	600		—
2020	863		43.8%
U.S. Decennial Census

When Loch Lloyd incorporated, its population was 136. The United States census reported it had a population of 368 and 175 housing units in September 2005. When the village filed the paperwork to incorporate, they said they wanted to incorporate as an independent village rather than being annexed by Kansas City or Belton.

=== Racial and ethnic composition ===
Loch Lloyd village, Missouri – Racial and ethnic composition Note: the US Census treats Hispanic/Latino as an ethnic category. This table excludes Latinos from the racial categories and assigns them to a separate category. Hispanics/Latinos may be of any race.
Race / Ethnicity (NH = Non-Hispanic)	Pop 2010	Pop 2020	% 2010	% 2020
White alone (NH)	562	787	93.67%	91.19%
Black or African American alone (NH)	19	21	3.17%	2.43%
Native American or Alaska Native alone (NH)	0	1	0.00%	0.12%
Asian alone (NH)	7	8	1.17%	0.93%
Native Hawaiian or Pacific Islander alone (NH)	0	0	0.00%	0.00%
Other race alone (NH)	1	0	0.17%	0.00%
Mixed race or Multiracial (NH)	2	21	0.33%	2.43%
Hispanic or Latino (any race)	9	25	1.50%	2.90%
Total	600	863	100.00%	100.00%

=== 2010 Census ===
As of the census of 2010, there were 600 people, 252 households, and 220 families residing in the village. The population density was 342.9 inhabitants per square mile (132.4/km^{2}). There were 279 housing units at an average density of 159.4 per square mile (61.5/km^{2}). The racial makeup of the village was 94.7% White, 3.2% African American, 1.2% Asian, 0.5% from other races, and 0.5% from two or more races. Hispanic or Latino of any race were 1.5% of the population.

There were 252 households, of which 17.5% had children under the age of 18 living with them, 83.3% were married couples living together, 2.4% had a female householder with no husband present, 1.6% had a male householder with no wife present, and 12.7% were non-families. 9.9% of all households were made up of individuals, and 4.4% had someone living alone who was 65 years of age or older. The average household size was 2.38 and the average family size was 2.55.

The median age in the village was 55.5 years. 14.3% of residents were under the age of 18; 3.4% were between the ages of 18 and 24; 12.7% were from 25 to 44; 44.5% were from 45 to 64; and 25.2% were 65 years of age or older. The gender makeup of the village was 49.2% male and 50.8% female.

== Education ==
Belton School District is the local school district. Its comprehensive high school is Belton High School.

Metropolitan Community College has the Belton school district in its taxation area.

== Notable people ==
- Loch Lloyd received national attention in July 2007, when evangelist Tammy Faye Messner died at her home on the lake there.
- Patrick Mahomes (Quarterback for the Kansas City Chiefs)
- Tom Watson (PGA golfer)

== 2023 Annexation Controversy ==
On October 26, 2023, Mayor Quinton Lucas of Kansas City addressed a significant concern in a letter directed to the Presiding Commissioner of Cass County, Missouri, Mr. Bob Huston. The letter outlined the apprehensions of the Kansas City government regarding the proposed construction of a landfill in South Kansas City. In an effort to prevent the landfill's development, Mayor Lucas proposed a solution: the secession of lands in South Kansas City to Cass County in exchange for the Village of Loch Lloyd. This would benefit both parties in that it could prevent the construction of the landfill.

The proposal elicited mixed reactions. Commissioner Huston expressed concern, stating that this proposition seemed to pit the residents of Cass County against each other. Mayor Lucas emphasized the City's keen interest in the Loch Lloyd area, referring to it as a significant investment opportunity.

One of the pivotal stakeholders, the Village of Loch Lloyd, responded independently to this proposition. The board of trustees of Loch Lloyd underscored the village's longstanding independence since its incorporation in 2003. In a letter disseminated to residents, the trustees affirmed that Loch Lloyd had no intention to align with Kansas City and highlighted that any annexation would necessitate their explicit consent.
