= Gregg Williams =

American football coach (born 1958)

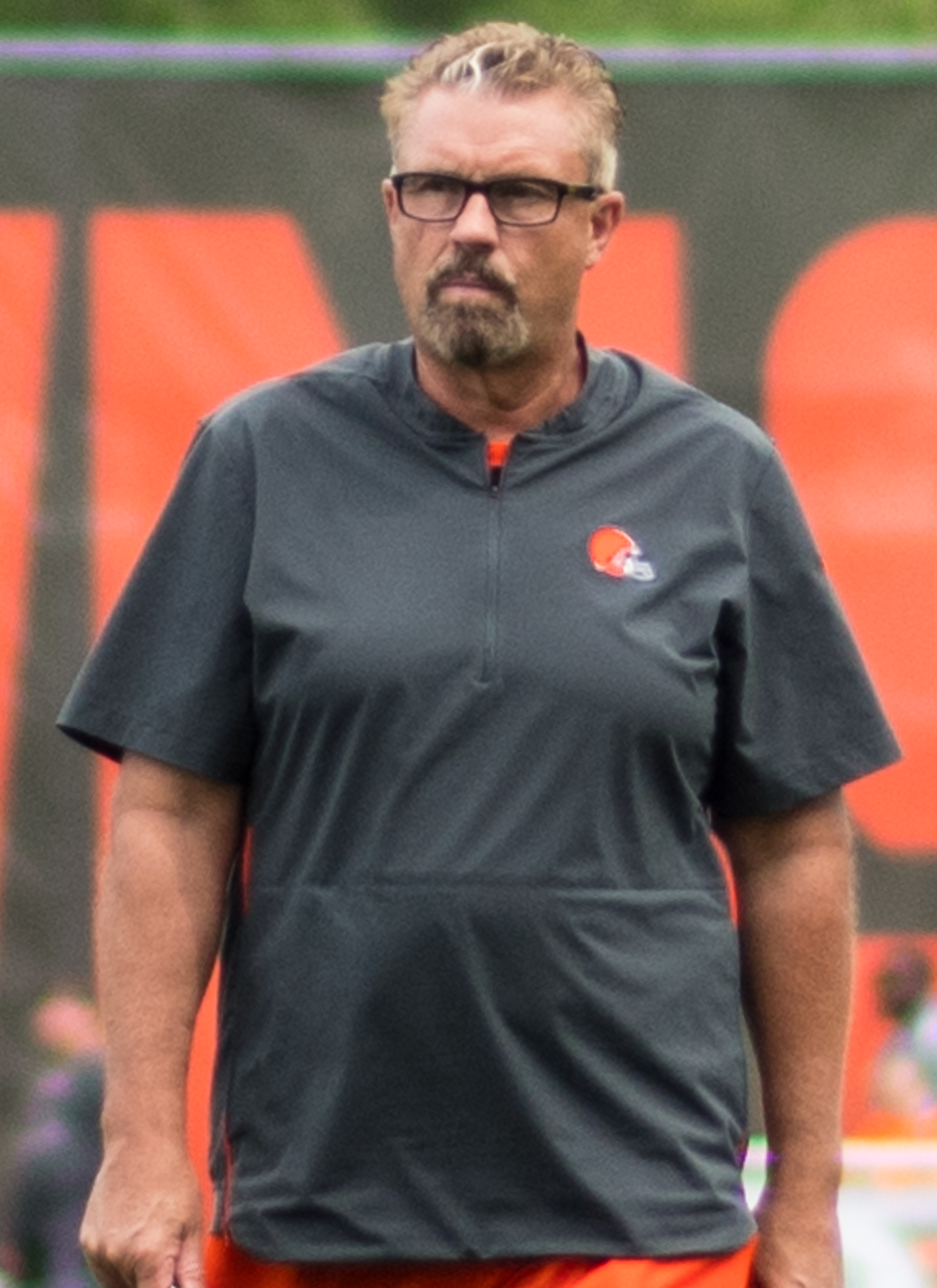
- Williams at 2018 Cleveland Browns training camp

Personal information
- Born: July 15, 1958 (age 68); Excelsior Springs, Missouri, U.S.

Career information
- High school: Excelsior Springs (MO)
- College: Northeast Missouri State

Career history
- Excelsior Springs High School (MO) (1980-1983) Assistant coach; Belton High School (1984–1987) Head coach; Houston (1988–1989) Graduate assistant; Houston Oilers (1990–1996) Defensive assistant, special teams & linebackers coach; Tennessee Oilers/Titans (1997–2000) Defensive coordinator; Buffalo Bills (2001–2003) Head coach; Washington Redskins (2004–2007) Defensive coordinator & assistant head coach; Jacksonville Jaguars (2008) Defensive coordinator; New Orleans Saints (2009–2011) Defensive coordinator; St. Louis Rams (2012) Defensive coordinator; Tennessee Titans (2013) Senior assistant defensive coach; St. Louis / Los Angeles Rams (2014–2016) Defensive coordinator; Cleveland Browns (2017–2018) Defensive coordinator; Cleveland Browns (2018) Interim head coach; New York Jets (2019–2020) Defensive coordinator; DC Defenders (2023–2025) Defensive coordinator & secondary coach; Tennessee State (2025) Defensive coordinator

Awards and highlights
- Super Bowl champion (XLIV)

Head coaching record
- Regular season: 22–34 (.393)
- Coaching profile at Pro Football Reference

Gregg Williams (born July 15, 1958) is an American football coach who was most recently the defensive coordinator for Tennessee State University. His most recent National Football League (NFL) experience was as the defensive coordinator for the New York Jets, from 2019 to 2020. Previously, he was head coach of the Buffalo Bills from 2001 to 2003, and defensive coordinator of the New Orleans Saints (with whom he won Super Bowl XLIV) from 2009 to 2011, and the Cleveland Browns, acting as an interim head coach in the 2018 season. Williams is known for running aggressive, attacking 4–3 schemes that put heavy pressure on opposing quarterbacks and for his key role in the New Orleans Saints bounty scandal, also known as "Bountygate".

In March 2012, Williams was suspended indefinitely from the NFL as a result of his admitted involvement in the New Orleans Saints bounty scandal, under which bounties were paid for causing injuries that would take targeted players on opposing teams out of games. Williams' suspension was lifted a year later, and he returned to the NFL.

Williams was inducted into the Missouri Sports Hall of Fame in 2016. In 2004, Williams helped create a charity, the "Gregg Williams Foundation", that benefits the local schools and community in his hometown of Excelsior Springs, Missouri. The charity has contributed over $2,000,000 since 2004 to benefit the Excelsior Springs community.

== Football career ==
=== Early career ===
After graduating from Excelsior Springs High School (MO) in 1976, Gregg Williams played quarterback at Northeast Missouri State University (now Truman State University) in Kirksville, Missouri. He started his coaching career as an assistant football coach at this alma mater, Excelsior Springs High School (MO). After being passed over for the head coaching job at Excelsior Springs High School in 1983, he was hired as head coach for the Class 5 Belton High School Pirate football team in Belton, Missouri. After coaching at Belton High School for four seasons, Williams was hired in 1988 as an assistant coach at the University of Houston under former Washington Redskins head coach, Jack Pardee.

=== Houston Oilers / Tennessee Titans ===
In 1990, Williams became the Special Teams coach of the Houston Oilers under then defensive coordinator, Buddy Ryan. From 1994 to 1996, Williams was the linebackers coach for the Oilers. From 1997–2000, Williams was promoted to defensive coordinator of the now Tennessee Titans after the Oilers moved out of Houston. As the defensive coordinator, the Titans led the league in total defense and only gave up 191 points, the third fewest in the NFL since the league adopted the 16-game schedule in 1978. The defense also helped lead the Titans to Super Bowl XXXIV where they lost to the St. Louis Rams. Williams was involved in the theft of the Baltimore Ravens quarterback Trent Dilfer's playbook in 2000 during a regular-season game, who claimed years later that Williams had previously admitted to doing so. A similar instance occurred in the 1999 AFC Championship Game, according to the former defensive lineman Renaldo Wynn, who claimed that Williams had admitted to having the Jacksonville Jaguars' playbook. Williams pushed back on using it for any advantage, claiming that he has every team's playbook and collects them.

=== Buffalo Bills ===
Williams joined the Buffalo Bills as head coach in 2001 along with new team President and general manager Tom Donahoe. After three seasons in which the team compiled records of 3–13, 8–8, and 6–10 under his leadership, Williams' contract was not renewed after the 2003 season.

=== Washington Redskins ===
After his release from Buffalo, Williams was at the top of several NFL teams' list for the position of defensive coordinator. Williams quickly signed with the Washington Redskins, the only team with which he interviewed, because Head Coach Joe Gibbs offered him total autonomy over his defensive players and defensive coaching staff.

In Washington, with Williams' aggressive defensive scheme, the Redskins' defense ranked third in the NFL in 2004 and ninth in 2005.

On January 3, 2006, Williams signed a three-year extension to remain with the Redskins, which made him the highest paid assistant coach in the NFL.

His defense struggled in 2006, at one point ranked 30th in the League. However, the 2007 season was a vast improvement for Williams. The defense ranked within the top ten in the NFC, and the team finished 9–7, with a loss in the wildcard round to the Seattle Seahawks. Williams had established a particularly close relationship with 24-year-old free safety Sean Taylor, calling him "the best player [he'd] ever coached." When Taylor was murdered mid-season on November 27, 2007, Williams was deeply affected. In tribute to Taylor, Williams called a defensive play with only ten men for the first play of the Redskins' first game after the tragedy, a December 2, 2007 game against the Buffalo Bills. For the remainder of the season, Williams ran an inspired defense which performed, along with the rest of the team, to honor Taylor's memory, highlighted by holding star running back Adrian Peterson of the Minnesota Vikings to 27 yards on December 23, 2007, and allowing a franchise-low one yard rushing to the Dallas Cowboys on December 30, 2007, sealing a playoff seed. After Joe Gibbs retired, Williams was considered to be the most popular candidate to take over as head coach of the Washington Redskins. He interviewed four times with team owner Daniel Snyder. However, on January 26, 2008, Williams was fired, along with offensive coordinator Al Saunders, with Jim Zorn ultimately getting the head coaching job.

=== Jacksonville Jaguars ===
On February 6, 2008, Williams became the defensive coordinator of the Jacksonville Jaguars, replacing Mike Smith, who had been hired to coach the Atlanta Falcons.

=== New Orleans Saints ===
Williams was hired by the New Orleans Saints on January 15, 2009. Head coach Sean Payton, who was heavily involved in the effort to recruit Williams to the team, raved about Williams "because he was so impressive and prepared" in his interview. In fact, Williams was so impressive that Payton offered and took a voluntary $250,000 cut in salary to help facilitate his signing with the team. He took over a Saints defense ranked 23rd in the NFL in yards allowed and tied for 26th in points allowed in 2008. Williams' approach yielded immediate results, as the 2009 Saints recorded 35 defensive takeaways, second in the league, and the aggressive defense played an integral role in the Saints' run to their first Super Bowl championship.

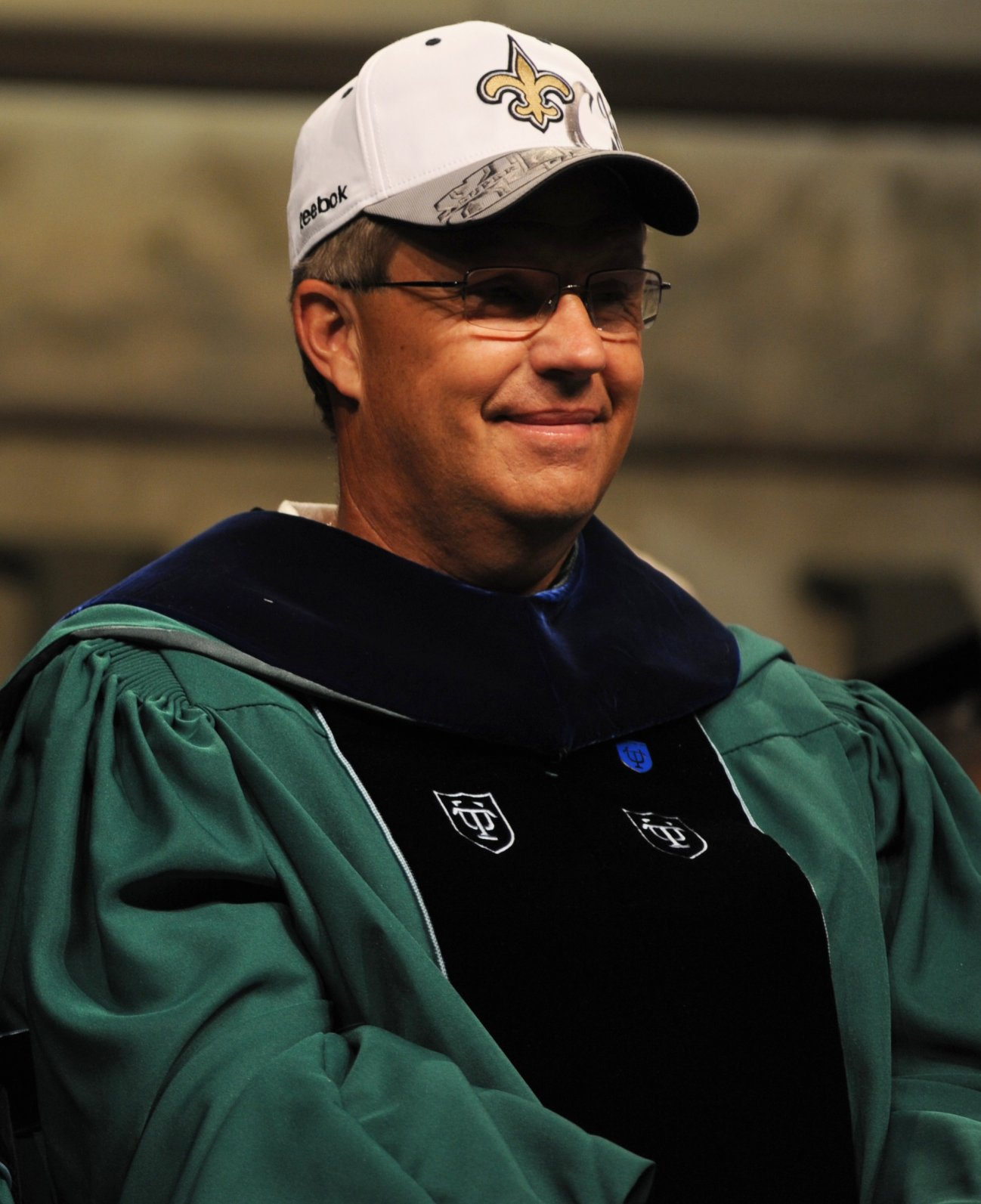
Williams in 2010

However, in the 2010 and 2011 seasons, the defense (although showing statistical improvement in some other categories) failed to repeat its turnover successes. The Saints were knocked out of the 2011 playoffs in a 36–32 loss to San Francisco, in which the defense played well for most of the game but twice failed to hold a Saints lead during the last four minutes. At that time, the relationship between Williams and Payton deteriorated, with Payton regarding Williams as a "rogue coach". Williams' departure from the Saints was originally publicized not as a dismissal since his contract was expiring, however Loomis and Payton fired Williams telling him, "There's no place for this in this organization or this league", after the NFL informed the Saints that it had reopened its investigation in the illegal bounty fund. It was widely reported that Williams would leave the Saints to become defensive coordinator of the St. Louis Rams, under their new head coach Jeff Fisher, for whom Williams had worked when Fisher was the head coach at Tennessee.

==== Involvement in Saints bounty scandal ====
On March 2, 2012, it was revealed that during Williams' tenure, the Saints ran an illegal "bounty fund" which paid players for causing injuries to opponents that would result in those players leaving the game. The NFL found that Williams and as many as 27 Saints defensive players were involved in the scheme. An unidentified Saints player first alerted the NFL to the scheme in the 2010 offseason, but the investigation stalled until the NFL found irrefutable evidence of a bounty system just before the 2011–12 playoffs.

A league investigation revealed that Williams began the bounty system soon after he arrived in New Orleans, after Payton charged him to make the Saints' defense "nasty." Players usually earned $1,000 for "cart-offs" and $1,500 for "knockouts" during the regular season (though payments were known to triple during the playoffs), though they were encouraged to put their winnings back into the pot in order to raise the stakes as the season went on. The investigation also found that Payton tried to cover up the scheme, and that linebackers coach Joe Vitt, whom Payton had assigned to monitor Williams (the two reportedly did not get along), knew about the broad lines of the scheme and did nothing.

Soon after the investigation came to light, several former players and coaches with the Bills and Redskins claimed that Williams operated similar systems while he was with them. Former NFL coach and current NBC Sports analyst Tony Dungy said that he was certain Williams operated a similar system with the Oilers/Titans as well. However, several players, coaches and team executives who were with Williams in Houston/Tennessee, Buffalo, and Washington have denied that Williams ever ran a bounty system.

Williams was summoned to NFL headquarters after the investigation concluded in mid-February. He initially denied any involvement, but recanted and admitted everything in a meeting with NFL Commissioner Roger Goodell. He issued a statement apologizing for his role, saying that he had known it was wrong from the start. On March 21, 2012, the NFL suspended Williams indefinitely for "conduct detrimental" to the league, effective that day. In a statement, the NFL said that its investigation had found that Williams not only administered the bounty program and occasionally contributed some of his own money to the bounty pool, but also lied to league investigators about his role. Consequently, the suspension would run until the end of the 2012 season at the earliest. When Williams applied for reinstatement, Goodell considered how much Williams cooperated with the NFL in its continuing investigation; Goodell also expected Williams to participate in league efforts to eliminate bounty systems altogether. The NFL continued to investigate allegations that Williams ran a bounty program in Washington.

Williams apologized again after he learned of his punishment, and said he hoped to return to coaching in the future. However, Fisher said that neither he nor the Rams knew about the bounty program, and he would have not have hired Williams had he known that Williams might be facing a year's suspension.

On April 5, documentary filmmaker Sean Pamphilon released audio of a meeting Williams held with his defense before their 2012 divisional playoff game against the San Francisco 49ers. In a profanity-laced speech, Williams instructed his defense to target several 49ers players. He ordered his men to try to knock out running back Kendall Hunter, even if it meant hitting him out of bounds. He specifically directed them to try to tear wide receiver Michael Crabtree's ACL, and to go after wide receiver Kyle Williams specifically because he had a history of concussions. Pamphilon, who was doing a documentary on the media's effect on football from Pee-Wee all the way to the NFL, released the audio to Yahoo! Sports because he was sickened by what he heard.

On December 12, the Associated Press reported that, according to a transcript of the bounty appeal hearing, Williams had testified that he had wanted to shut down the system after the league began investigating, but was overruled by Saints linebackers coach Joe Vitt. Vitt, however, denied the claims.

=== St. Louis Rams ===
On February 3, 2012, Williams was formally introduced as the Rams' new defensive coordinator. A little over a month later, on March 21, Williams was suspended indefinitely for his role in the Saints bounty scandal, and was fired on January 2, 2013, without ever working a day for the Rams.

=== Tennessee Titans ===
On February 7, 2013, Williams was reinstated by the NFL and officially hired by the Tennessee Titans as a senior assistant defensive coach. In the official statement released by the league, commissioner Roger Goodell cited Williams' acceptance of responsibility for his role in the bounty program and pledge to never be involved in another such "pay for performance" system as the main reasons for Williams' reinstatement after just one year.

=== Return to St. Louis / Los Angeles Rams ===
Williams was hired as defensive coordinator for the Rams on February 12, 2014.

He would return to New Orleans to face against his former team on November 27, 2016. The Saints would shred Williams' defense, which gave up 555 yards, in a 49–21 win over the Rams. Some would see the Saints running up the score as a measure of revenge against Williams for his role in Bountygate.

On December 12, 2016, the Los Angeles Rams fired head coach Jeff Fisher. His coaching staff, along with Williams, was fired at the end of the season.

=== Cleveland Browns ===
Williams was hired as the defensive coordinator of the Cleveland Browns on January 7, 2017.

On October 29, 2018, following head coach Hue Jackson's dismissal, Williams was named the Browns interim head coach, while Freddie Kitchens was named interim offensive coordinator. Williams guided the Browns to a 5–3 record, including a credible showing against the Kansas City Chiefs, and was responsible for the emergence of Baker Mayfield as the team's quarterback. There was growing support for Williams to take over as head coach on a permanent basis, although his previous history as Bills head coach and the Bountygate scandal may have hurt his cause.

Following the appointment of offensive coordinator Freddie Kitchens as permanent head coach, Williams and several defensive coaching assistants were let go by the Browns. With a 0.625 winning percentage in eight games as coach, he was the first head coach since Marty Schottenheimer in 1988 to leave Cleveland with a winning record as coach.

=== New York Jets ===
On January 16, 2019, Williams was hired as the defensive coordinator for the New York Jets under new head coach Adam Gase. While the Jets offense struggled, Williams led the Jets to seventh in the NFL in overall defense including second against the run.

On December 7, 2020, Williams was fired from the Jets following a 31–28 loss to the Las Vegas Raiders. The firing came after Williams called a controversial zero blitz on a Hail Mary play in an attempt to sack Derek Carr. However, Carr found Henry Ruggs open, beating corner Lamar Jackson for a game-winning touchdown with five seconds left, thus dropping the Jets to 0–12.

=== DC Defenders ===
On June 9, 2022, Williams was announced as the defensive coordinator for the DC Defenders under head coach Reggie Barlow. Williams would stay with the Defenders for three seasons.

=== Tennessee State ===
On April 9, 2025, Williams stepped down from his position as defensive coordinator with the Defenders, as he had accepted a new role as the defensive coordinator for Tennessee State University, where Barlow had recently been hired as head coach. He named his son Blake Williams as the Defenders' defensive coordinator for the rest of the 2025 season. Williams was reportedly fired from Tennessee State on January 15, 2026 after the team finished 2-10, despite the defense’s relative success.

== Personal life ==
Williams has been married twice. He has three children, two sons and a daughter, from his first marriage. His son Blake Williams succeeded him as the DC Defenders' defensive coordinator.

== Head coaching record ==
=== NFL ===
Team	Year	Regular season					Postseason			
Team	Year	Won	Lost	Ties	Win %	Finish	Won	Lost	Win %	Result
BUF	2001	3	13	0	.188	5th in AFC East	–	–	–	–
BUF	2002	8	8	0	.500	4th in AFC East	–	–	–	–
BUF	2003	6	10	0	.375	3rd in AFC East	–	–	–	–
BUF total		17	31	0	.354		–	–	–	–
CLE*	2018	5	3	0	.625	3rd in AFC North	–	–	–	–
CLE total		5	3	0	.625		–	–	–	–
Total		22	34	0	.393		–	–	–	–

* – Interim head coach
