= Belton High School (Missouri) =

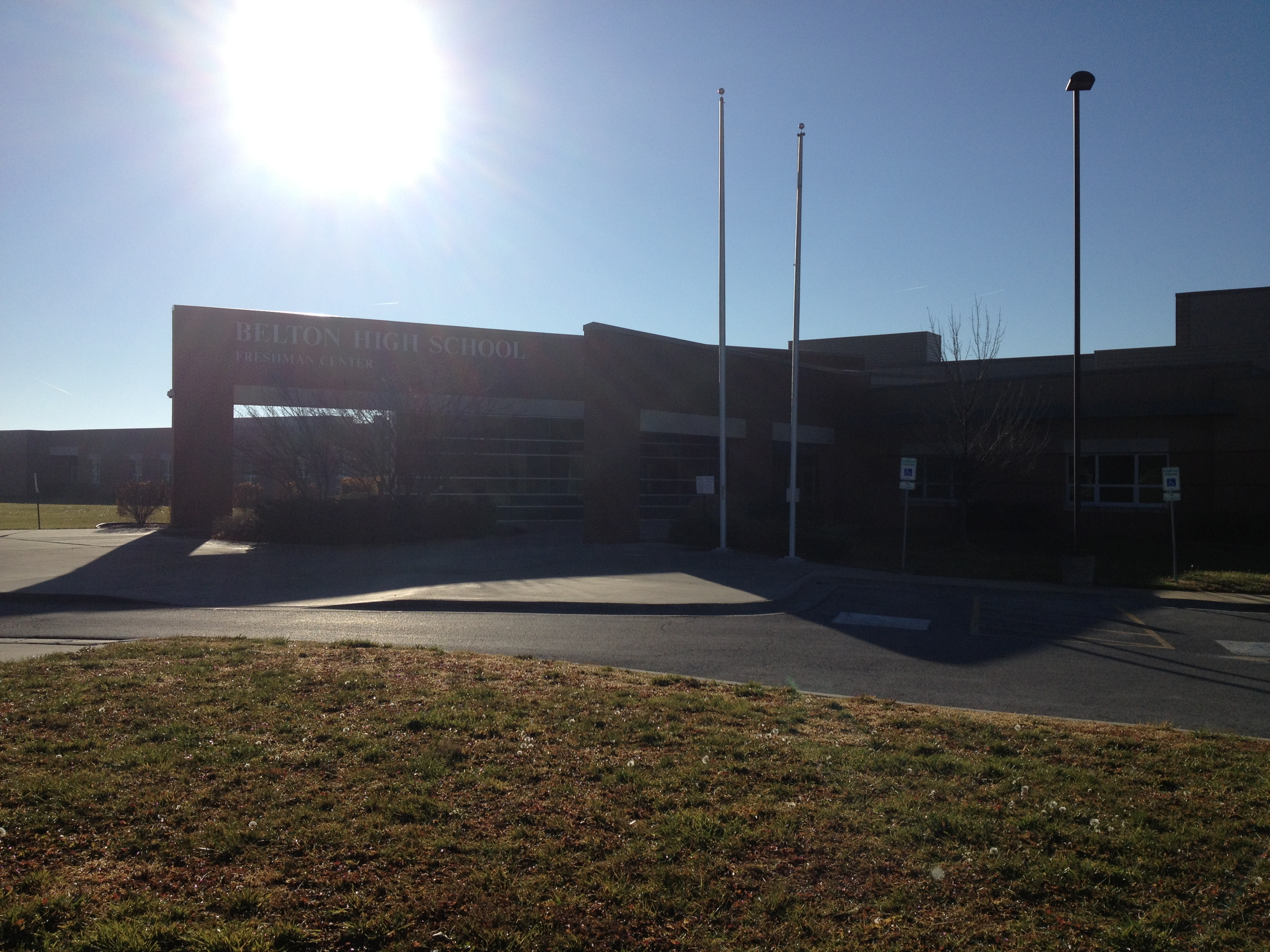
- Front view of the school

Location
- 801 W North Ave; Belton, Missouri 64012; United States; 38°48′49″N 94°33′08″W

Information
- School type: Comprehensive Public High School
- Established: 1946
- Status: Currently operational
- Locale: Rural: fringe
- School district: Belton School District USD No. 124
- NCES District ID: 2904620
- CEEB code: 260160
- NCES School ID: 290462000055
- Principal: Christopher Kensinger
- Teaching staff: 88.15 (FTE)
- Grades: 9–12
- Enrollment: 1,272 (2023–2024)
- Student to teacher ratio: 14.43
- Campus type: Suburban
- Colors: Purple and Gold
- Athletics conference: Greater Kansas City Suburban Conference
- Mascot: Pirate
- Yearbook: Beltonian
- Website: bhs.beltonschools.org
- Last updated: 9 June 2022

Belton High School is a 9–12 grade high school located in Belton, Missouri, United States. It is a part of Belton School District.

The district, and therefore the school boundary, includes most of Belton, Loch Lloyd, and Riverview Estates.

== Notable alumni ==
- Joe Falcon, middle-distance runner
- John Kelsey, former WFL player
- Brad St. Louis, former NFL player for the Cincinnati Bengals
- Tate Stevens, The X Factor USA season 2 winner

== Notable faculty ==
- Gregg Williams, former Buffalo Bills head coach, was the high school's football coach in the mid-1980s
