= Belton School District =

School district in Missouri, U.S.

Location
- Belton, Missouri United States

District information
- Type: School District
- Grades: PreK–12
- Superintendent: Dr. Andrew Underwood
- NCES District ID: 2904620

Students and staff
- Students: 4,213 (21-22)
- Teachers: 320.27 (on FTE basis)
- Student–teacher ratio: 15.79:1

Other information
- Website: www.beltonschools.org

Belton School District #124 is an American public school district with its headquarters located in Belton, Missouri. The organization oversees nine schools and in 2021-2022 had a total enrollment of 4,213 students PreK-12.

The district includes most of Belton, Loch Lloyd, and Riverview Estates.

== List of schools in the district ==
=== High school ===
- Belton High School (grades 9–12)

=== Middle School ===
- Belton Middle School (grades 7–8)

=== Elementary schools ===
- Cambridge Elementary (grades K-4)
- Gladden Elementary (grades K-4)
- Wilckens STEAM Academy at Hillcrest (grades K-6)
- Kentucky Trail Elementary (grades K-4)
- Mill Creek Upper Elementary (grades 5–6)

=== Special Services/Other Sites ===
- Scott Education Center (grades K-12)
- Grace Early Child Care and Education Center (PreK)
- Yeokum Center of Innovation

== Image gallery ==
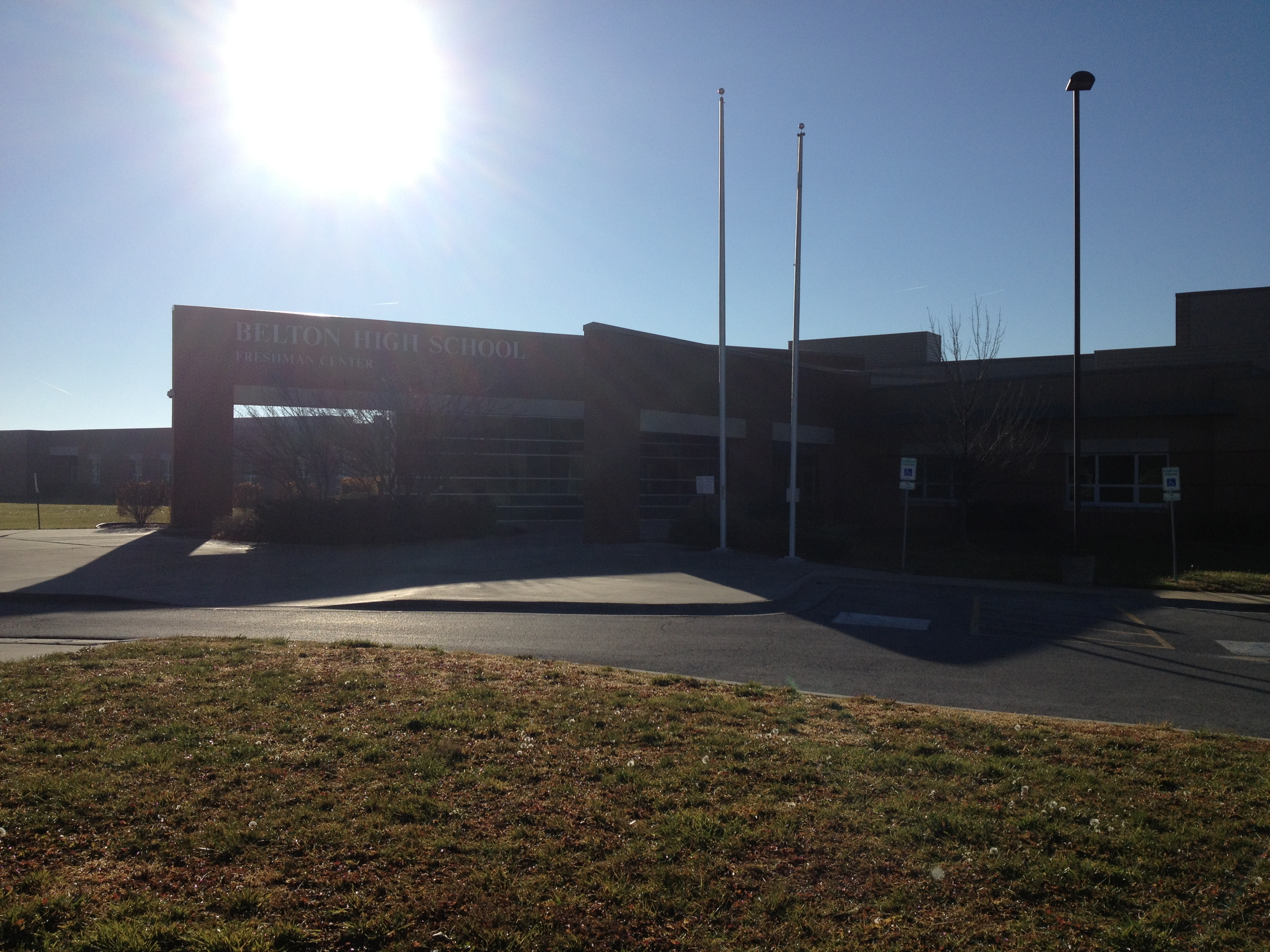
Belton High School

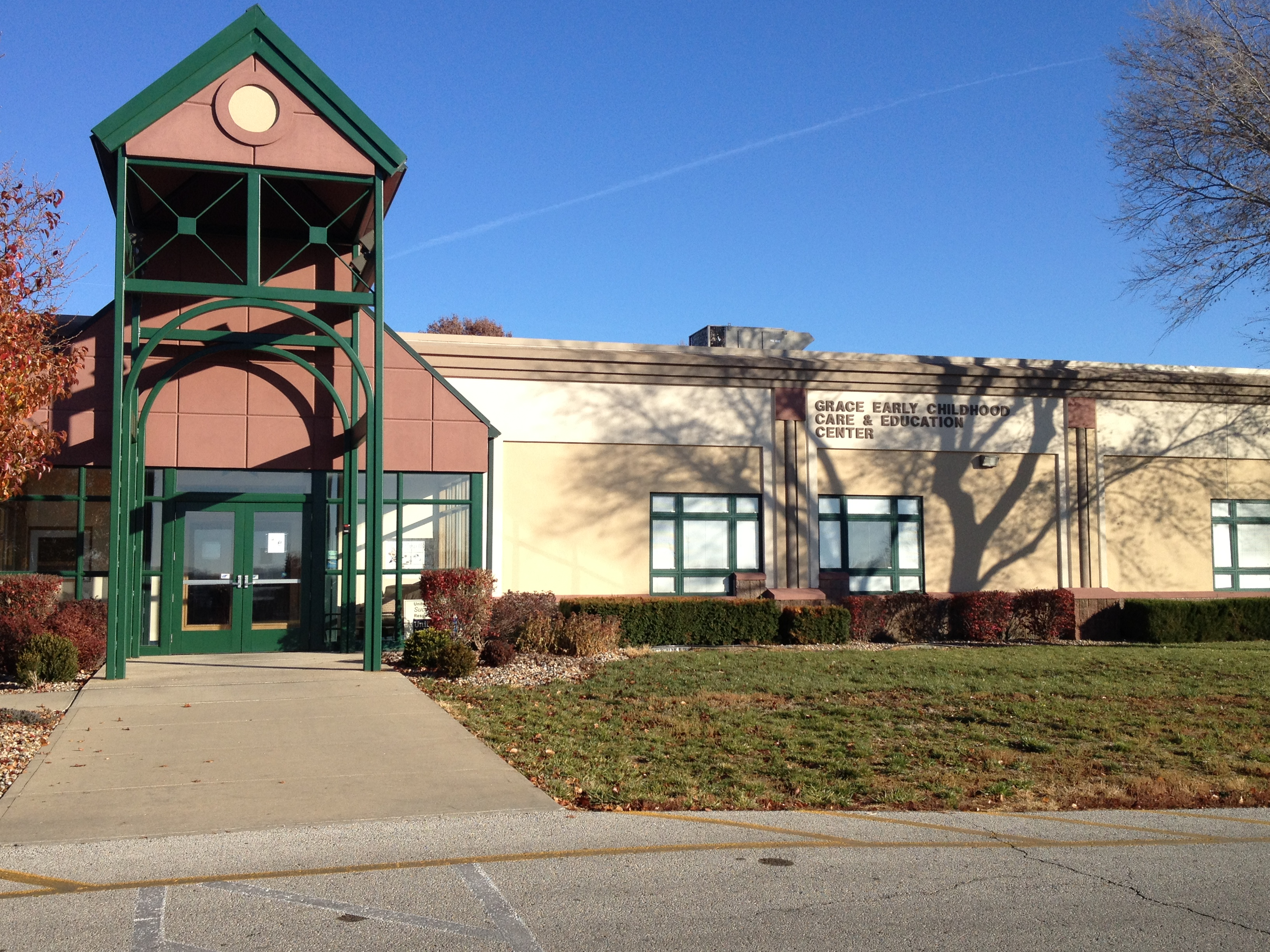
Grace Early Childhood Care & Education Center

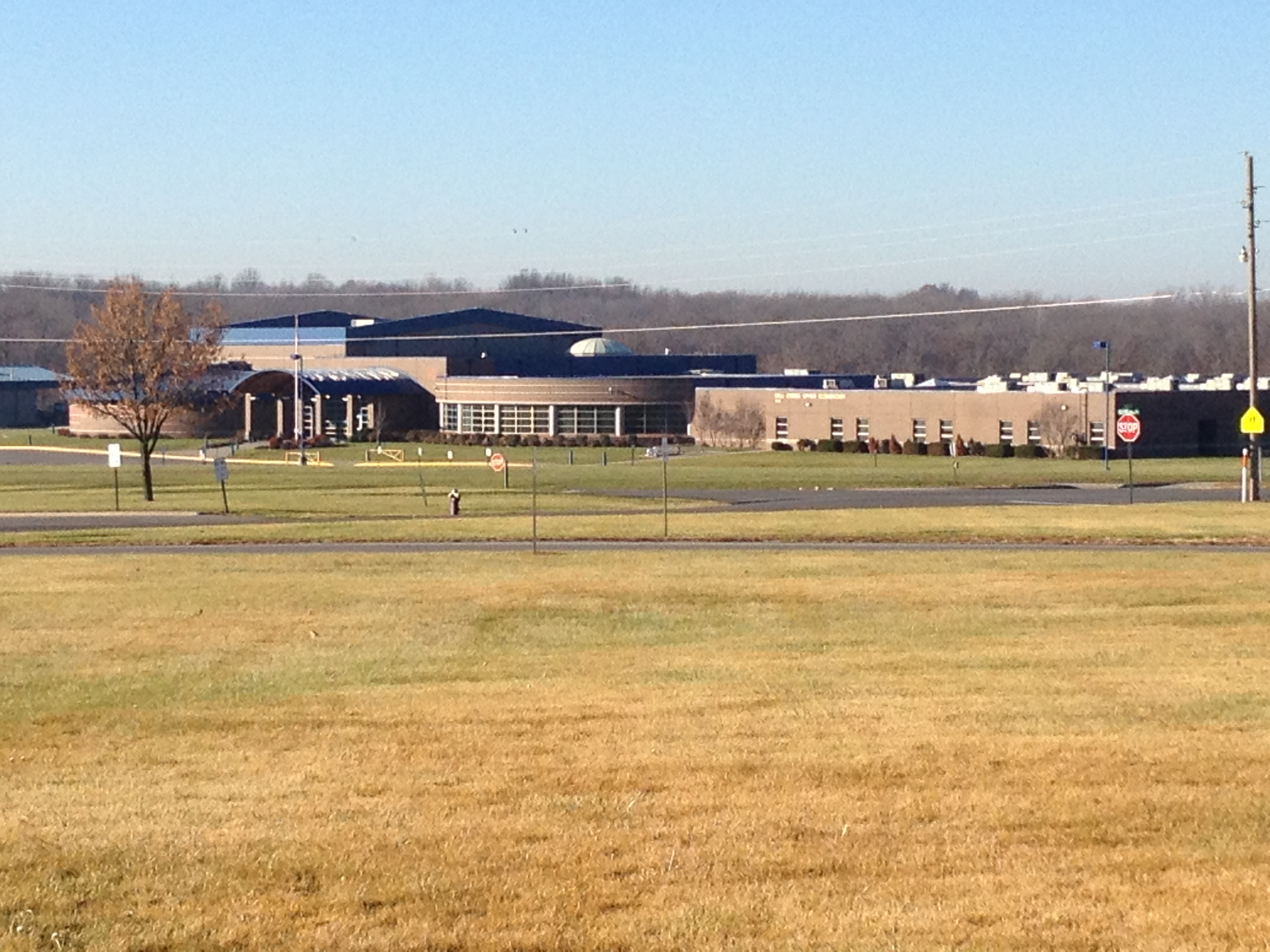
Mill Creek Upper Elementary

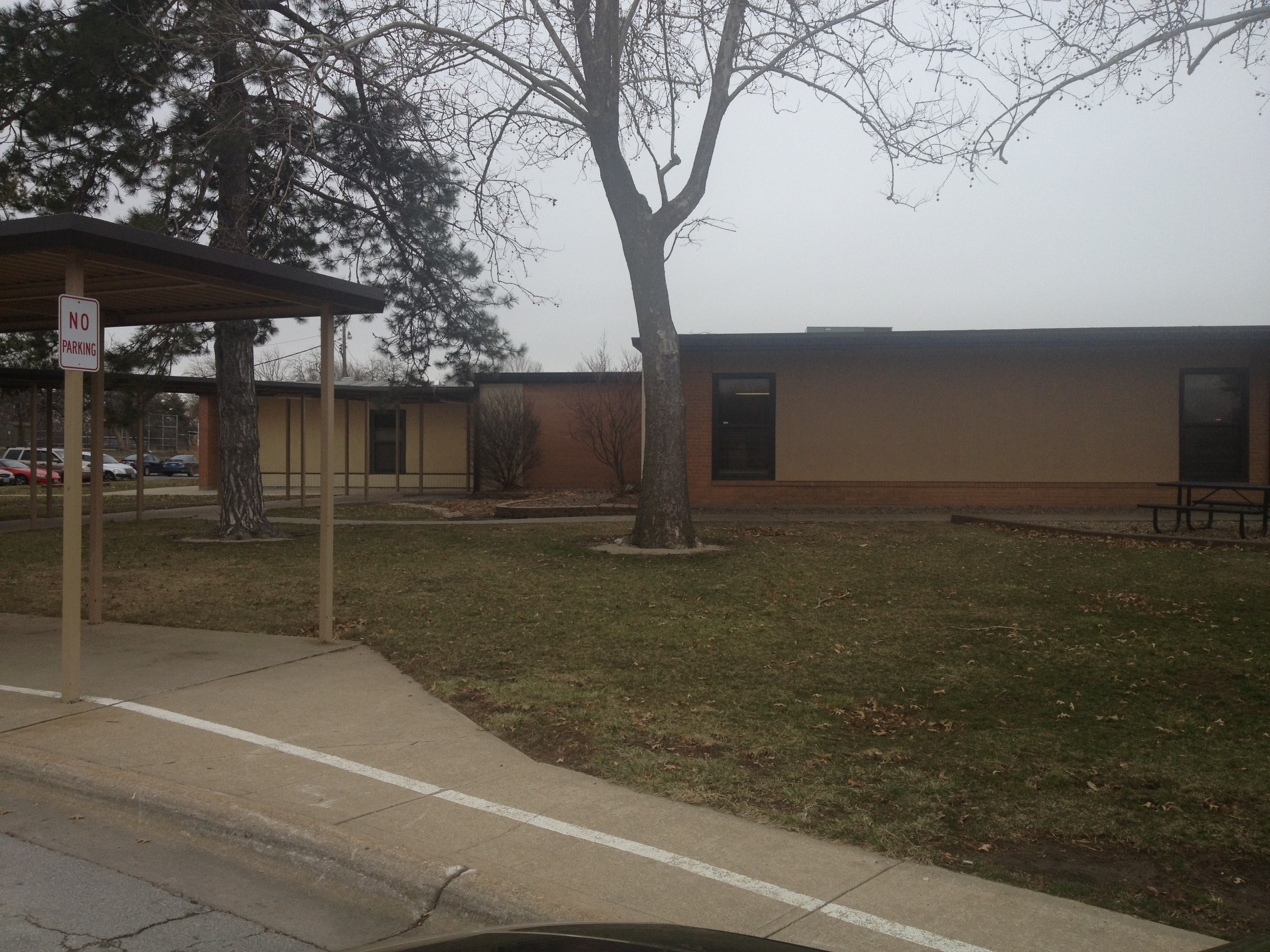
Gladden Elementary School

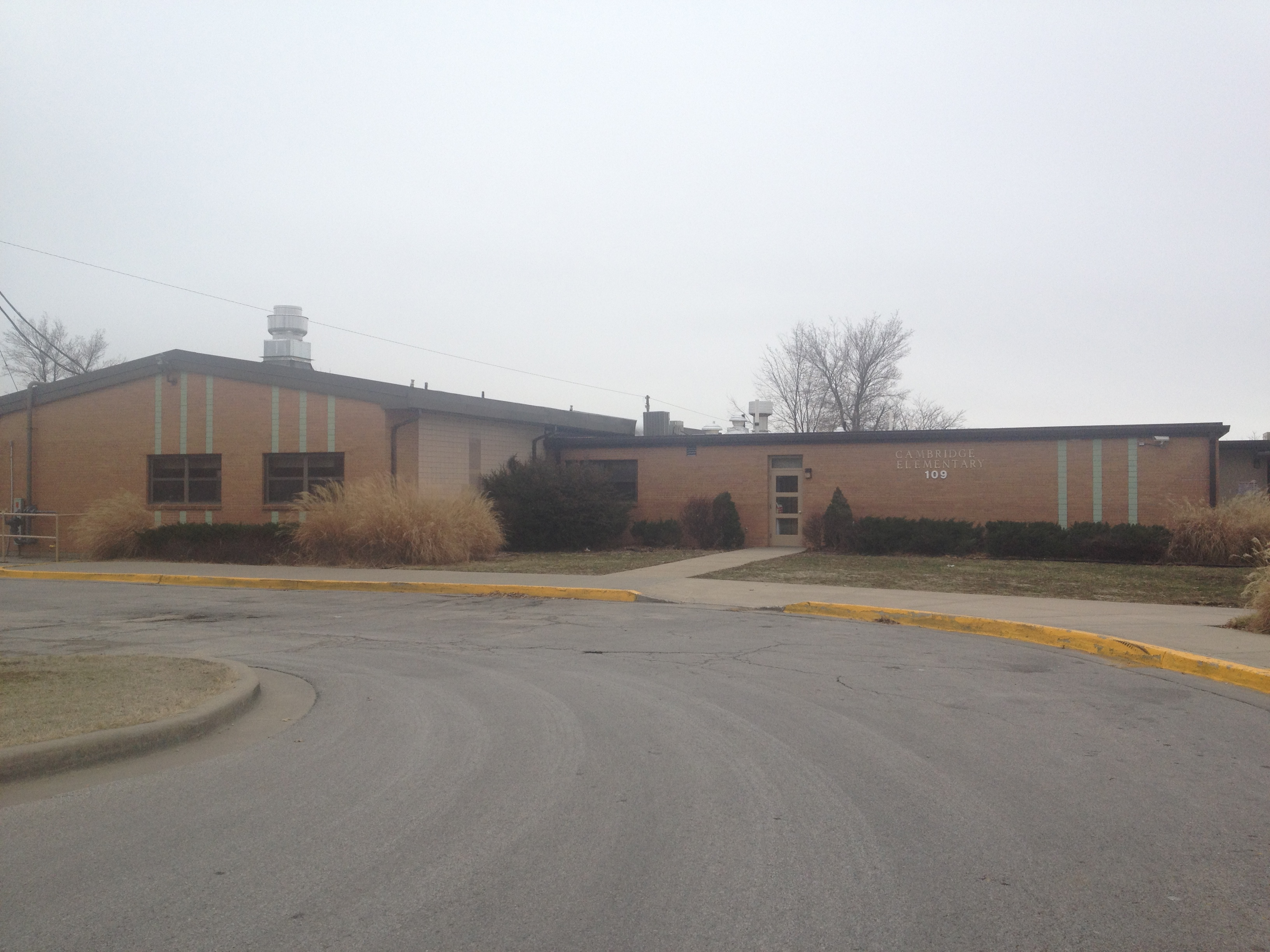
Cambridge Elementary School

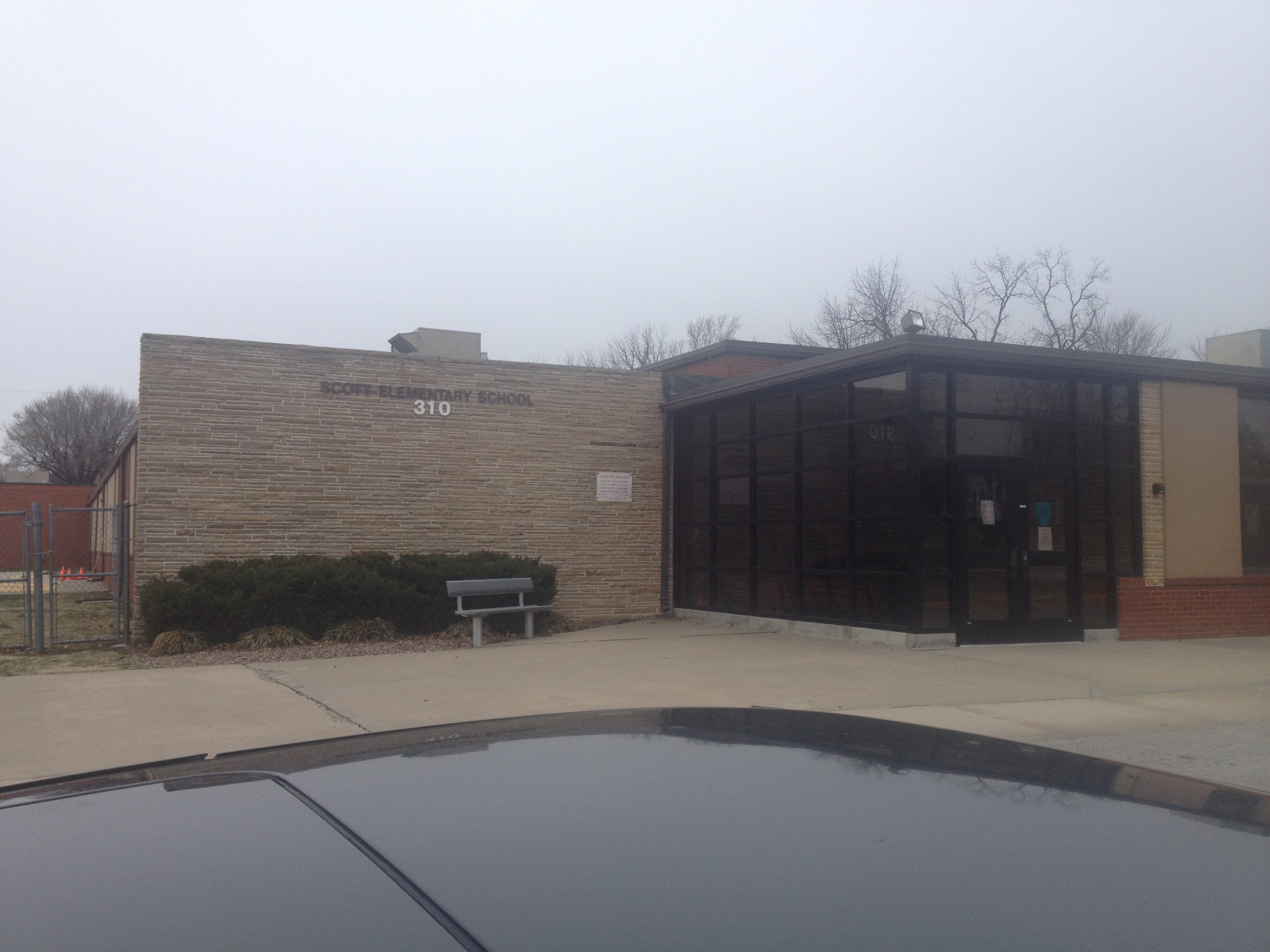
Scott Educational Center

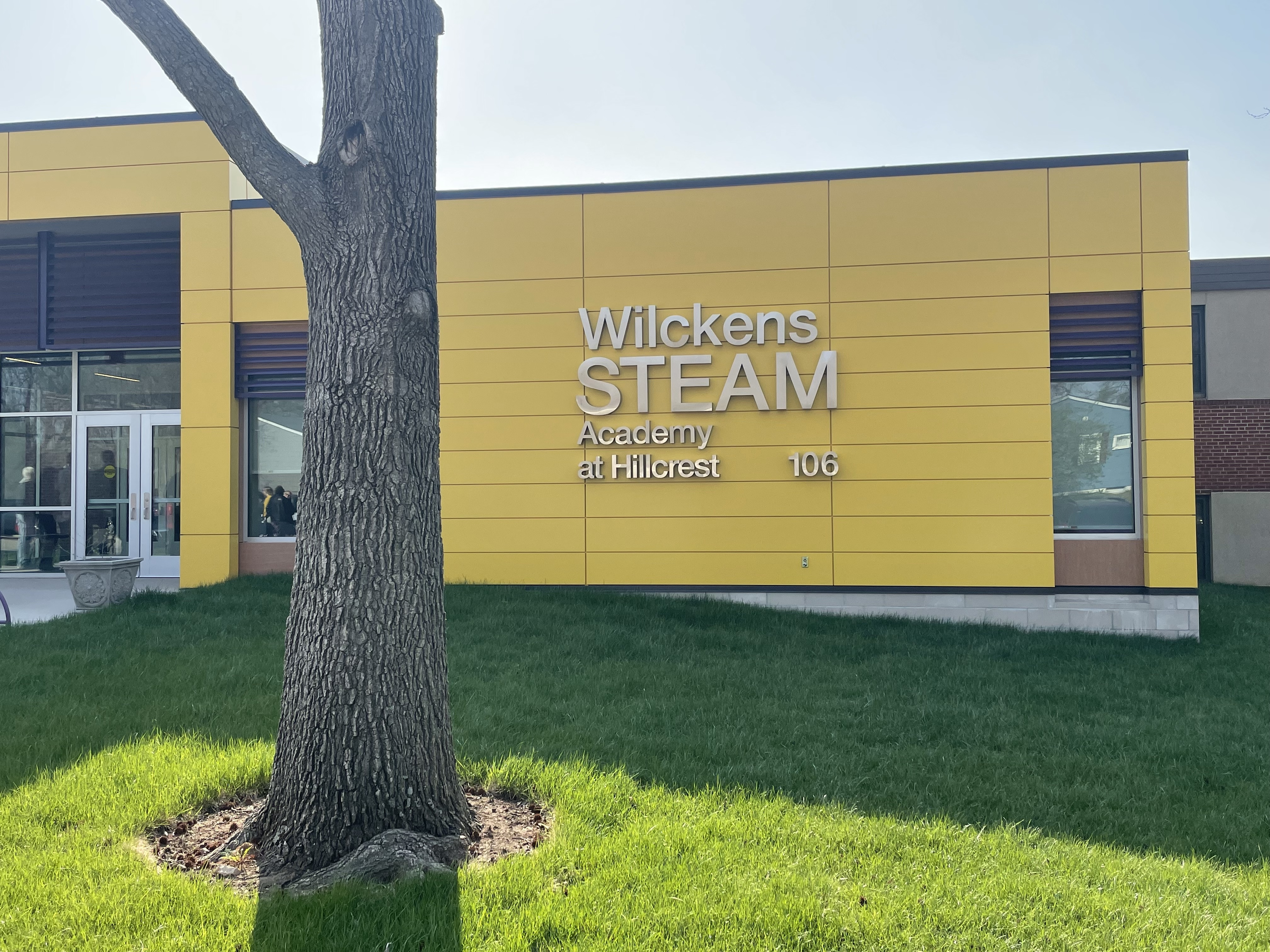
Wilckens STEAM Academy at Hillcrest

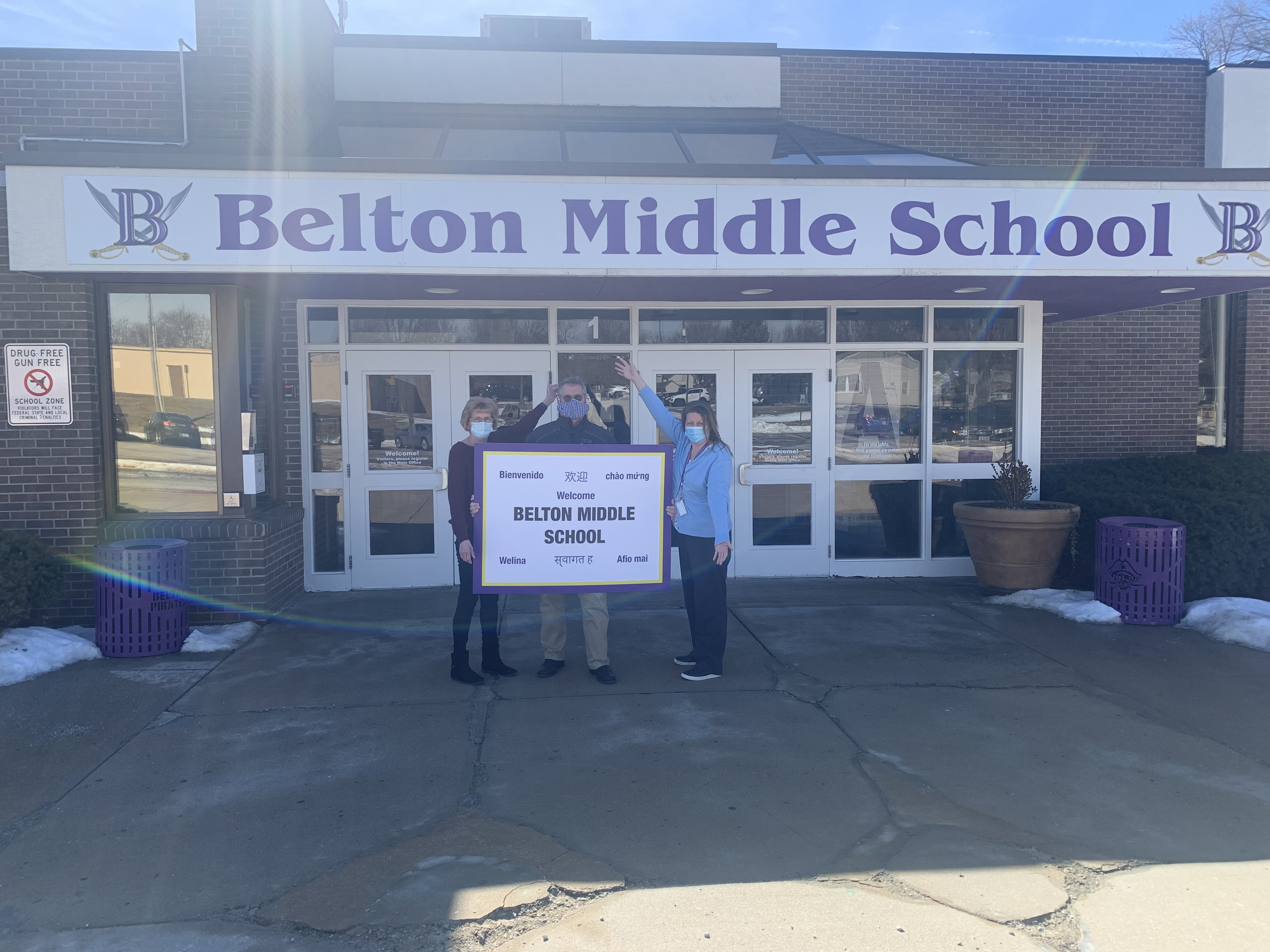
Belton Middle School

== See also ==
- List of school districts in Missouri
