= Long snapper =

Specialized player in gridiron football

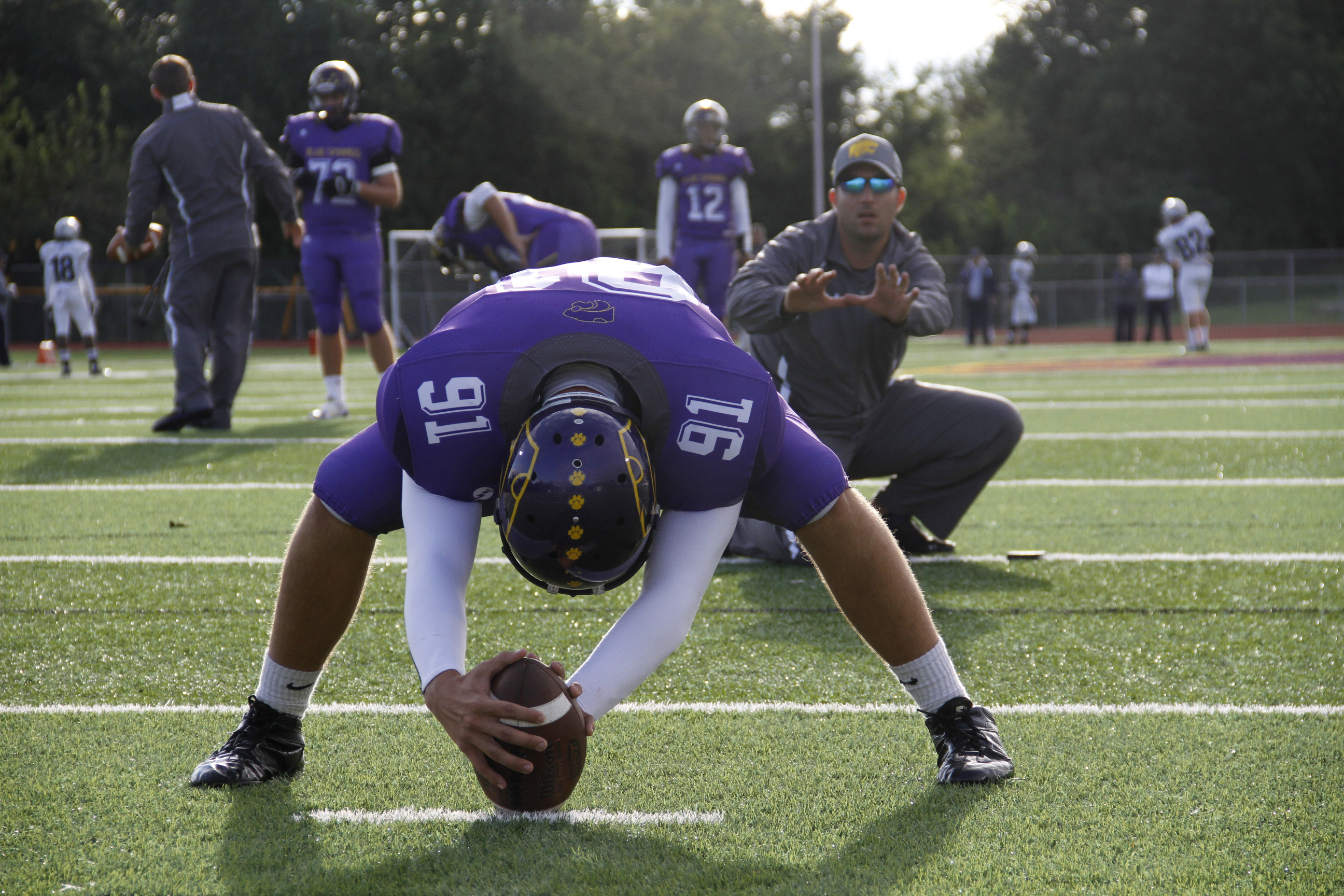
A long snapper (91, foreground) practicing field goal snaps with his position coach (background)

Diagram of a punt formation, the long snapper is indicated by the blue "DS"

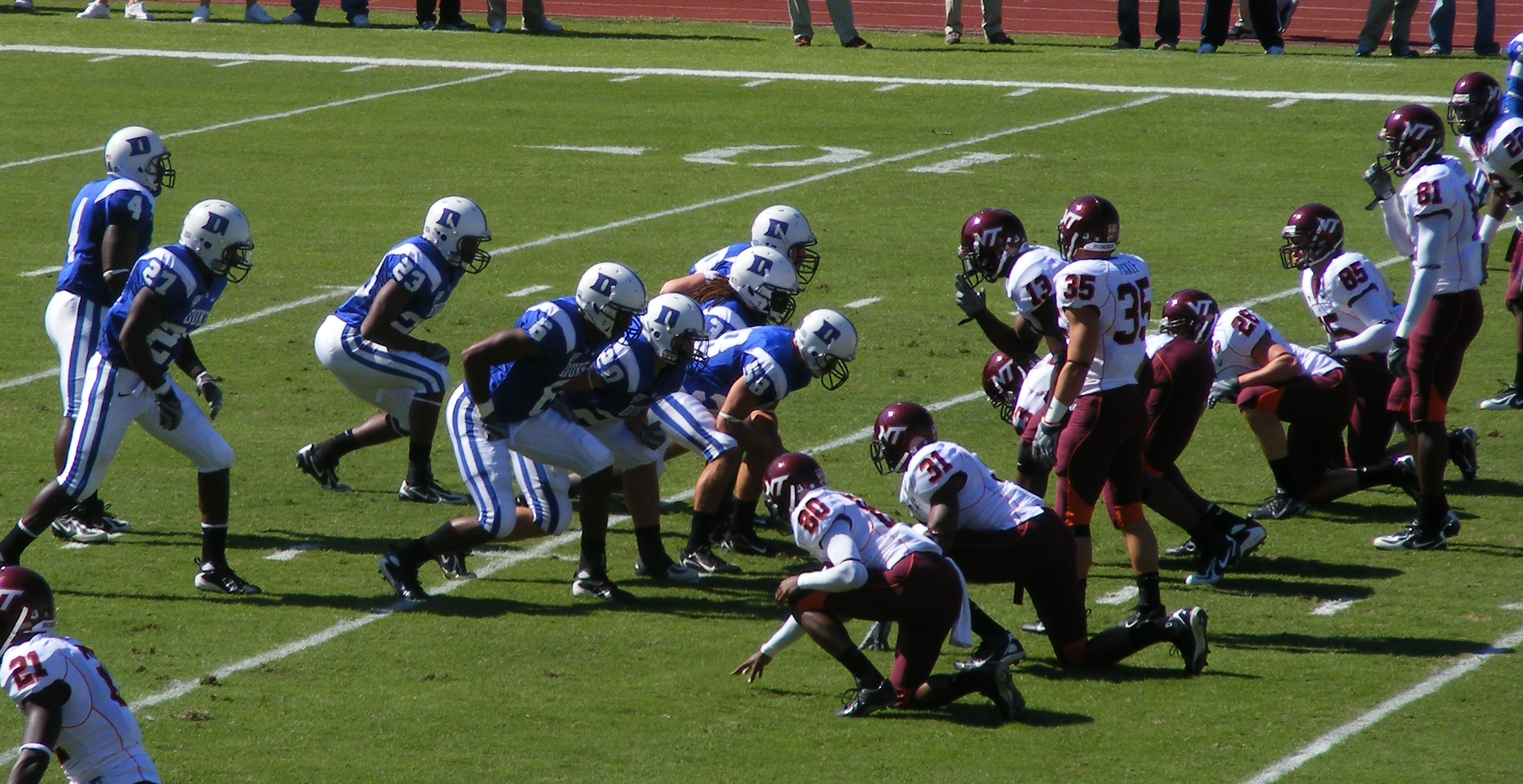
In the traditional or "cup" punt formation, the long snapper is the center of the interior line (#58 in blue)

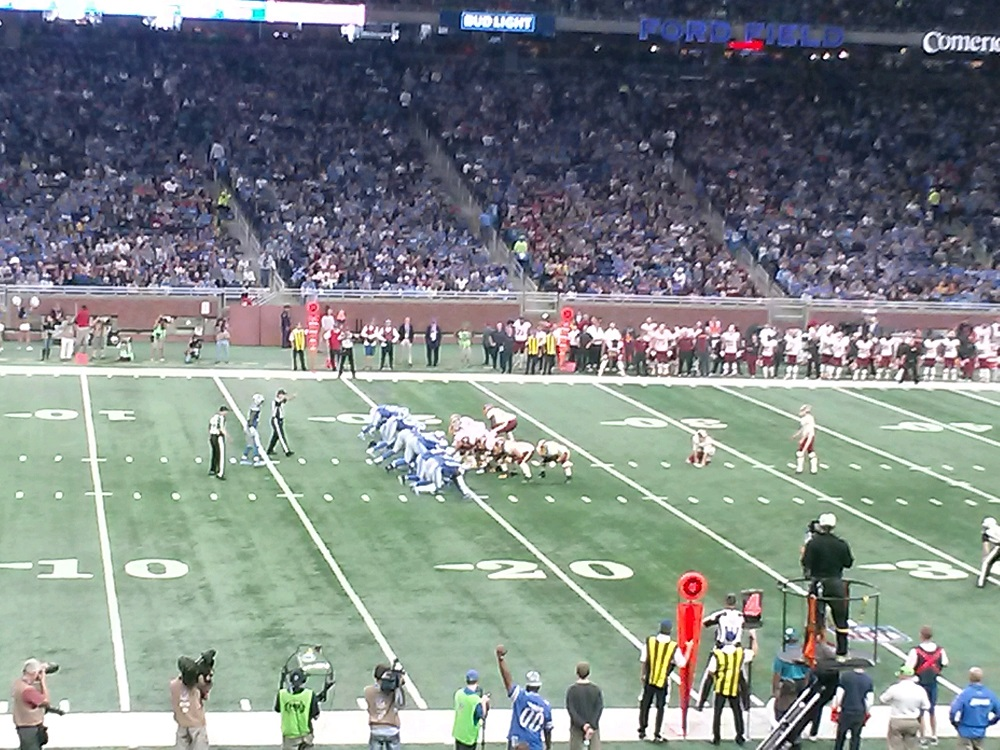
Traditional field goal formation with the long snapper in the center

In gridiron football, the long snapper (or deep snapper) is a center on special teams whose duty is to snap the football over a longer distance, typically around 15 yards during punts, and 7–8 yards during field goals and conversion attempts.

== Overview ==
During field goal and point after touchdown attempts, the snap is received by the holder, typically 7–8 yards away. During punts, the snap is delivered to the punter from 13 to 15 yards away. Following a punt snap, the snapper often executes a blocking assignment and then must cover the kick by running downfield and attempting to stop the opposing team's punt returner from advancing the ball in the opposite direction. If the punt goes uncaught, it is the snapper's responsibility to make sure the ball does not enter the end zone or bounce backward resulting in loss of yards. The majority of snappers at the highest levels of competition are specialized, meaning that they uniquely play the position of snapper, or have limited responsibilities elsewhere.

A good punt snap should hit the target—the punter's hands at the abdomen or waistline—between .65 and .75 seconds and with a tight spiral for easy handling. A "bad snap" is an off-target snap which causes the delay or failure of a kick or forces the punter into some other potentially compromising situation.

Long snapper was not always a dedicated position, often filled by a lineman who was not getting playing time. Over time the position's value increased and teams have trained, recruited, and even offered scholarships to true long snappers.

== In the NCAA ==
College rules are such that any of the 11 players on the punting team are allowed to proceed downfield at any time once the play has begun (unlike the NFL where only 2 players, the left and right gunners, are allowed to pass the line of scrimmage before the ball has been kicked). This results in many teams employing a "spread punt" or "rugby-style" scheme designed to maximize downfield coverage and limit returners from making larger gains the other way after receiving the ball.

In the NCAA, defensive players are not able to line up within the shoulder length frame of the long snapper. Defensive players who play opposite of the long snapper are also not allowed to initiate contact with the long snapper until 1 second after the ball has been snapped. These rules were created to protect the long snapper, as they are in a compromised position with their head usually down and unprotected.

== In the NFL ==
Unlike college, NFL rules do not provide for a set period of time after the snap before the long snapper can be engaged by the defense. However, no defensive player can line up directly in front of the long snapper when the offense is in a kick formation. Officials generally enforce this rule through verbal admonishment to an offending player prior to the snap. If the defensive lineman moves into a legal position before the snap, no penalty flag is thrown.

Before specialization, the long snapper often was a player who primarily played another position, mostly assumed to be backup centers because they perform regular snap duties to quarterbacks, and also to quarterbacks positioned further out in a shotgun formation. However, a recent example would be Allen Aldridge, who started at linebacker for the Detroit Lions and also served as the team's long snapper. Buccaneers tight end Dave Moore spent the final three seasons of his career as the team's long snapper while regularly appearing on offense. This allows the team to dress another non-specialist player. Now, every team in the NFL has a specialized long snapper, a trend born on the Washington Redskins in 1971, where head coach and general manager George Allen made George Burman the first modern long snapper—someone whose roster spot was based on the long snap, and not other positions.

Long snappers are usually among the least-known players in the NFL because of their highly specialized and relatively invisible role on the field. No player is in the Hall of Fame as a long snapper, they are rarely featured on trading cards, and they are rarely drafted, with a few exceptions:

- Todd Thomas was the first known player to be selected for his long-snapping abilities, in the fifth round (124th overall) of the 1981 NFL draft, by the Kansas City Chiefs. He served as the long snapper for the Chiefs during the 1981 season. After that season, however, he was primarily used as a tight end/tackle.
- Kendall Gammon was drafted by the Pittsburgh Steelers primarily for his long-snapping abilities in the eleventh round (291st overall) of the 1992 NFL draft. He spent fifteen years in the NFL as a long snapper and backup offensive lineman/tight end, and was named to the Pro Bowl in 2004.
- Jeff Robinson was selected in the fourth round of the 1993 NFL draft by the Denver Broncos, as a defensive end with the 98th overall pick. During his career, Robinson moonlighted as a LS, and later also played for the St. Louis Rams and Dallas Cowboys; he earned a Super Bowl ring with the Rams in Super Bowl XXXIV.
- Patrick Mannelly was selected in the sixth round (189th overall) of the 1998 NFL draft, for his long snapping abilities by the Chicago Bears. He is known as the "de facto" first player ever to be selected specifically as a long snapper. At the time, draft records listed the Duke alum as a guard, but he served as the long snapper for the Bears from his first season onward. In 2019, the Patrick Mannelly Award, given to the best long snapper in college football, was created.
- Dan O'Leary was selected in the sixth round (195th overall) of the 2001 NFL draft by the Buffalo Bills, although he was drafted as a tight end.
- Ryan Pontbriand was drafted in the fifth round (142nd overall) of the 2003 NFL draft by the Cleveland Browns, although he was drafted as an offensive center.
- Zak DeOssie, long snapper for the New York Giants, was drafted in the fourth round (116th overall) of the 2007 NFL draft; however, at the time he was drafted as a linebacker.
- The first pure long snapper to have been picked in the draft was Tyler Schmitt, a sixth round pick (189th overall) in 2008, selected by the Seattle Seahawks.
- Joe Cardona was drafted as a long snapper by the New England Patriots in the fifth round (166th overall) of the 2015 NFL draft.
- Jimmy Landes was drafted as a long snapper by the Detroit Lions in the sixth round (210th overall) of the 2016 NFL draft, before going on the injured reserve list and being released the following year.
- Colin Holba was drafted as a long snapper by the Pittsburgh Steelers in the sixth round (213th overall) of the 2017 NFL draft.
- Hunter Bradley was drafted as a long snapper by the Green Bay Packers in the seventh round (239th overall) of the 2018 NFL draft.
- Austin Cutting was drafted as a long snapper by the Minnesota Vikings in the seventh round (250th overall) of the 2019 NFL draft.
- Blake Ferguson was drafted as a long snapper by the Miami Dolphins in the sixth round (185 overall) of the 2020 NFL draft.
- Thomas Fletcher was drafted as a long snapper by the Carolina Panthers in the sixth round (222nd overall) of the 2021 NFL draft.
- Camaron Cheeseman was drafted as a long snapper by the Washington Football Team in the sixth round (225th overall) of the 2021 NFL draft.
- Julian Ashby was drafted as a long snapper by the New England Patriots in the seventh round (251st overall) of the 2025 NFL draft.
- Several other players who went on to be their team's long snapper the following season have been selected but were listed at different positions during the draft. For example, Brad St. Louis was listed as a tight end in the 2000 NFL draft, and Jake Ingram was listed as a center in the 2009 NFL draft.

=== Importance of the position ===
The number of young men training to become long snappers has increased, as families learn that they do not have to be as large or fast as in other positions to receive a college athletic scholarship. For those few playing in the NFL, job security is high while earning millions; the average length of a long snapper's career in the league is 7.5 years, more than double that of all other positions. Boys begin training as early as in elementary school.

Despite their anonymity, a team lacking a skilled long snapper can be seriously undermined. A famous example of this was on January 5, 2003, during the 2002 wild card playoff game between the San Francisco 49ers and New York Giants. During the regular season, the Giants suffered missed field goals due to the lack of an experienced long snapper, and signed Trey Junkin out of retirement to be the snapper for the playoff game. Junkin botched a snap on a field goal attempt that could have won the game for the Giants, who had led 38–14 at one point in the game. Brad St. Louis of the Cincinnati Bengals was another long snapper who, besides having already botched two snaps in clutch situations in 2005 (wild card play-off game against the eventual champions Pittsburgh Steelers) and 2006, gained even bigger notoriety in 2009, when he delivered five bad snaps on either field goal or extra point attempts (leading to missed, aborted or blocked kicks) in the first five games of the season, which led to the then ten-year veteran being released from the team.

In 2008, it was the Pittsburgh Steelers that had long snapper problems. During an October 26, 2008 game against the New York Giants, the team's regular long snapper, Greg Warren, was injured with what was eventually revealed to be a season-ending torn ACL. Linebacker James Harrison, who had served in 2004 as the long snapper for the Rhein Fire of NFL Europe, volunteered to replace Warren. In the fourth quarter, Harrison's first and only snap sailed over punter Mitch Berger's head and through the end zone for a safety. This tied the score and gave the Giants good field position on the ensuing kick, resulting in the go-ahead touchdown late in the game. Warren sustained a second ACL tear in December 2009, though this occurred on the last play of a December 20 game against the Green Bay Packers, giving the Steelers adequate time to sign replacement Jared Retkofsky, who had also been signed to replace Warren after his injury in 2008.

In 2012, Raiders' long snapper Jon Condo was injured and was backed up by Travis Goethel, a linebacker, for a game against the San Diego Chargers. On two occasions during the game, punter Shane Lechler was unable to handle snaps that had bounced prior to reaching him. On another attempt, Lechler took his position much closer to the line of scrimmage than is normal for a punter, so as to decrease the distance Goethel needed to accurately snap the ball. Though the snap was adequate, the decreased distance resulted in a blocked punt.

In the Cincinnati Bengals' 2022 season opener against the Pittsburgh Steelers, Bengals' long snapper Clark Harris suffered a biceps injury, forcing backup tight end Mitchell Wilcox to have to perform long snapping duties in Harris's stead. What would have been a game-winning extra point conversion for the Bengals as the game clock expired was blocked, forcing the game to go to overtime. In the overtime period, for what would have been a game-winning field goal for the Bengals, the snap was high, resulting in the field goal attempt missing wide right. The Bengals would go on to lose the game to the Steelers.

== See also ==
- Patrick Mannelly Award
