= Brad St. Louis =

American football player (born 1976)

No. 48
- Position: Long snapper

Personal information
- Born: August 19, 1976 (age 50); Belton, Missouri, U.S.
- Listed height: 6 ft 3 in (1.91 m)
- Listed weight: 243 lb (110 kg)

Career information
- High school: Belton
- College: Southwest Missouri State (1996–1999)
- NFL draft: 2000: 7th round, 210th overall pick

Career history
- Cincinnati Bengals (2000–2009)

Career NFL statistics
- Games played: 144
- Total tackles: 35
- Stats at Pro Football Reference

Brad Allen St. Louis (born August 19, 1976) is an American former professional football player who was a long snapper in the National Football League (NFL). He was selected by the Cincinnati Bengals in the seventh round of the 2000 NFL draft as a tight end. He played college football for the Southwest Missouri State Bears.

== Early life ==
St. Louis attended Belton High School in Belton, Missouri, graduating in 1995. St. Louis lettered in football, wrestling, tennis, and track. In football, as a tight end, he caught 42 passes for 508 yards over two years, and was named his team's Lineman of the Year as a junior. As a senior, Brad was a Missouri State champion in wrestling.

== College career ==
St. Louis attended Southwest Missouri State University where he earned a degree in dietetics. St. Louis was inducted into Missouri State's Athletic Hall of Fame February 5, 2011. St. Louis graduated as the top tight end receiver in Bears' football history. He was a four-year letterman, and three-year starter, from 1996 to 1999. He closed his playing career with 93 catches for 1,074 yards and seven touchdowns, becoming the first Bears tight end to reach the 1,000-yard receiving mark. St. Louis played for the Bears under coach Del Miller for three seasons and coach Randy Ball for one year. In 1999, St. Louis earned Football Gazette Football Championship Subdivision All-America honors to go with three Missouri Valley Football Conference all-league first-team selections for his receiving and blocking skills. He was the first Bear to play in two postseason all-star games, competing in the East–West Shrine Game and the Hula Bowl following his senior season.

== Professional career ==
St. Louis was selected by the Cincinnati Bengals in the seventh round (210th overall) of the 2000 NFL draft. St. Louis was the first long snapper drafted in team history. Besides being the starting long snapper, St. Louis saw action on the kickoff return and punt return teams during his first three seasons with the team. In a game on November 12, 2000, against the Dallas Cowboys, St. Louis' snap was high. This caused Bengals holder and punter Daniel Pope to stand up and do an emergency punt from the Cowboys 24 yard line. The ball rolled into the end-zone, and the play went down as the closest punt to an opposition's end-zone in NFL history. St. Louis also saw action as a tight end during his first three seasons. St. Louis spent 10 seasons with the Bengals before being cut in October 2009.
