= John Kelsey (cricketer) =

English cricketer

Personal information
- Full name: John Heneage Kelsey
- Born: 30 March 1867; Tunbridge Wells, Kent, England
- Died: 21 October 1945 (aged 78); Wadhurst, Sussex, England
- Batting: Right-handed

Domestic team information
- Years: Team
- 1902: Sussex

Career statistics
Competition	First-class
Matches	1
Runs scored	1
Batting average	1.00
100s/50s	–/–
Top score	1
Balls bowled	–
Wickets	–
Bowling average	–
5 wickets in innings	–
10 wickets in match	–
Best bowling	–
Catches/stumpings	–/–
- Source: Cricinfo, 1 July 2012

John Heneage Kelsey (30 March 1867 – 21 October 1945) was an English cricketer. Kelsey was a right-handed batsman. He was born at Tunbridge Wells, Kent, and was educated at Repton School.

Kelsey made a single first-class appearance for Sussex against Worcestershire at the County Ground, Hove, in the 1902 County Championship. Sussex won the toss and elected to bat first, making 399/7 declared, during which Kelsey scored a single run before he was dismissed by George Simpson-Hayward. Worcestershire were then dismissed in their first-innings for 197, with Sussex forcing them to follow-on in their second-innings, with Worcestershire making 240 all out, which left Sussex with a target of 39 for victory. Sussex reached their target in their second-innings without losing any wickets. This was his only major appearance for Sussex.

Outside of cricket, he was a brewer. He died at Wadhurst, Sussex, on 21 October 1945.
