= John Kelsey (American football) =

American football player (born 1952)

No. 86
- Position: Tight end

Personal information
- Born: November 22, 1952 (age 73); Austin, Texas, U.S.
- Listed height: 6 ft 6 in (1.98 m)
- Listed weight: 240 lb (109 kg)

Career information
- High school: Belton (MO)
- College: Missouri
- NFL draft: 1974: 5th round, 126th overall pick

Career history
- The Hawaiians (1974–1975)

John Wayne Kelsey (born November 22, 1952) is an American former football tight end in the World Football League (WFL) for The Hawaiians. He played college football at the University of Missouri.

== Early life ==
Kelsey attended Belton High School. He accepted a football scholarship from the University of Missouri. As a sophomore, he posted 11 receptions for 141 yards (fourth on the team) and one touchdown.

As a junior, he was passed on the depth chat by John Muse and only had 3 receptions for 63 yards. As a senior, he recorded 7 receptions for 71 yards and 2 touchdowns.

== Professional career ==
Kelsey was selected by the Dallas Cowboys in the fifth round (126th overall) of the 1974 NFL draft. He instead opted to sign with The Hawaiians of the World Football League. He was the starter at tight end, registering 37 receptions for 505 yards (13.6-yard avg.) and 6 touchdowns. He played until the league folded mid-way through the 1975 season.
