= Belton, Missouri =

City in Missouri, US

- City
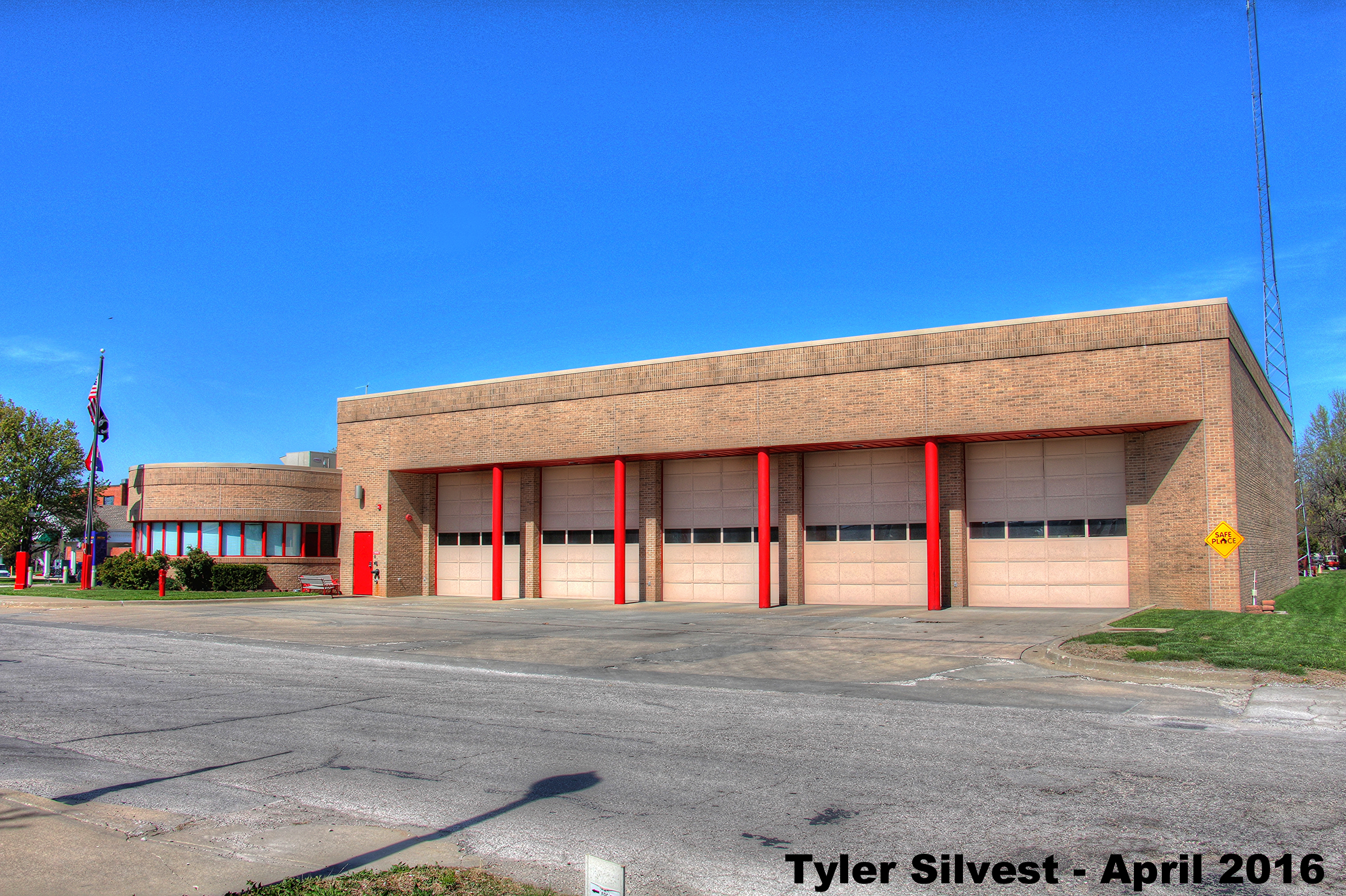
- Belton in 2016

- Location in Missouri
- Coordinates: 38°49′09″N 94°32′01″W
- Country: United States
- State: Missouri
- County: Cass

Area
  - Total: 14.31 sq mi (37.07 km^{2})
  - Land: 14.25 sq mi (36.90 km^{2})
  - Water: 0.069 sq mi (0.18 km^{2})
- Elevation: 1,099 ft (335 m)

Population (2020)
  - Total: 23,953
  - Density: 1,681.5/sq mi (649.22/km^{2})
- Time zone: UTC-6 (Central (CST))
  - Summer (DST): UTC-5 (CDT)
- ZIP code: 64012
- Area codes: 816, 975
- FIPS code: 29-04384
- GNIS feature ID: 2394125
- Website: belton.org

Belton is a city in northwestern Cass County, Missouri, United States. The population was 23,953 at the 2020 census. It is south of the Kansas City metropolitan area.

== History ==
Belton was platted in 1871. The city was likely named for surveyor Capt. Marcus Lindsey Belt. A post office called Belton has been in operation since 1872.

== Geography ==
Belton is located in northwestern Cass County and is four miles from the Missouri-Kansas border. The city is on Missouri Route 58 west of I-49/U.S. Route 71. Raymore lies four miles to the east, Peculiar is seven miles to the southeast along Route 71, and Grandview is five miles to the north in Jackson County.

According to the United States Census Bureau, the city has a total area of 14.32 square miles (37.09 km^{2}), of which 14.25 square miles (36.91 km^{2}) is land and 0.07 square miles (0.18 km^{2}) is water.

== Demographics ==
Historical population
| Census | Pop. | Note | %± |
|---|---|---|---|
| 1880 | 552 | | — |
| 1890 | 988 | | 79.0% |
| 1900 | 1,005 | | 1.7% |
| 1910 | 922 | | −8.3% |
| 1920 | 899 | | −2.5% |
| 1930 | 992 | | 10.3% |
| 1940 | 971 | | −2.1% |
| 1950 | 1,233 | | 27.0% |
| 1960 | 4,897 | | 297.2% |
| 1970 | 12,270 | | 150.6% |
| 1980 | 12,708 | | 3.6% |
| 1990 | 18,150 | | 42.8% |
| 2000 | 21,730 | | 19.7% |
| 2010 | 23,116 | | 6.4% |
| 2020 | 23,953 | | 3.6% |
U.S. Decennial Census

=== Racial and ethnic composition ===
Belton city, Missouri – Racial and ethnic composition Note: the US Census treats Hispanic/Latino as an ethnic category. This table excludes Latinos from the racial categories and assigns them to a separate category. Hispanics/Latinos may be of any race.
| Race / Ethnicity (NH = Non-Hispanic) | Pop 2000 | Pop 2010 | Pop 2020 | % 2000 | % 2010 | % 2020 |
|---|---|---|---|---|---|---|
| White alone (NH) | 19,516 | 18,957 | 17,745 | 89.81% | 82.01% | 74.08% |
| Black or African American alone (NH) | 610 | 1,342 | 1,886 | 2.81% | 5.81% | 7.87% |
| Native American or Alaska Native alone (NH) | 109 | 128 | 120 | 0.50% | 0.55% | 0.50% |
| Asian alone (NH) | 121 | 196 | 259 | 0.56% | 0.85% | 1.08% |
| Native Hawaiian or Pacific Islander alone (NH) | 16 | 27 | 51 | 0.07% | 0.12% | 0.21% |
| Other race alone (NH) | 19 | 31 | 101 | 0.09% | 0.13% | 0.42% |
| Mixed race or Multiracial (NH) | 322 | 561 | 1,580 | 1.48% | 2.43% | 6.60% |
| Hispanic or Latino (any race) | 1,017 | 1,874 | 2,211 | 4.68% | 8.11% | 9.23% |
| Total | 21,730 | 23,116 | 23,953 | 100.00% | 100.00% | 100.00% |

=== 2020 census ===
As of the 2020 census, Belton had a population of 23,953 and a population density of 1,682.1 per square mile (649.1/km^{2}).

The median age was 36.1 years. 25.6% of residents were under the age of 18 and 14.3% of residents were 65 years of age or older. For every 100 females there were 94.8 males, and for every 100 females age 18 and over there were 91.6 males age 18 and over.

99.3% of residents lived in urban areas, while 0.7% lived in rural areas.

Of the 9,171 households in Belton, 33.7% had children under the age of 18 living in them. Of all households, 45.9% were married-couple households, 17.3% were households with a male householder and no spouse or partner present, and 28.0% were households with a female householder and no spouse or partner present. About 26.7% of all households were made up of individuals and 11.5% had someone living alone who was 65 years of age or older. There were 6,470 families in the city.

There were 9,936 housing units, of which 7.7% were vacant. The homeowner vacancy rate was 1.9% and the rental vacancy rate was 11.6%.

Racial composition as of the 2020 census
| Race | Number | Percent |
|---|---|---|
| White | 18,402 | 76.8% |
| Black or African American | 1,928 | 8.0% |
| American Indian and Alaska Native | 139 | 0.6% |
| Asian | 259 | 1.1% |
| Native Hawaiian and Other Pacific Islander | 53 | 0.2% |
| Some other race | 835 | 3.5% |
| Two or more races | 2,337 | 9.8% |

=== 2016–2020 American Community Survey ===
The 2016–2020 5-year American Community Survey estimates show that the median household income was $65,667 (with a margin of error of +/- $6,113) and the median family income $72,003 (+/- $6,020). Males had a median income of $44,234 (+/- $4,453) versus $31,825 (+/- $3,105) for females. The median income for those above 16 years old was $37,555 (+/- $2,205). Approximately 8.5% of families and 10.1% of the population were below the poverty line, including 17.7% of those under the age of 18 and 4.0% of those ages 65 or over.

=== 2010 census ===
As of the census of 2013, there were 23,175 people, 8,623 households, and 6,083 families living in the city. The population density was 1,622.2 inhabitants per square mile (626.3/km^{2}). There were 9,440 housing units at an average density of 662.5 per square mile (255.8/km^{2}). The racial makeup of the city was 85.7% White, 6.0% African American, 0.6% Native American, 0.9% Asian, 0.1% Pacific Islander, 3.7% from other races, and 3.1% from two or more races. Hispanic or Latino of any race were 8.1% of the population.

There were 8,623 households, of which 39.7% had children under the age of 18 living with them, 49.5% were married couples living together, 15.0% had a female householder with no husband present, 6.0% had a male householder with no wife present, and 29.5% were non-families. 24.3% of all households were made up of individuals, and 8.8% had someone living alone who was 65 years of age or older. The average household size was 2.67 and the average family size was 3.15.

The median age in the city was 33.6 years. 28.2% of residents were under the age of 18; 8.7% were between the ages of 18 and 24; 28.2% were from 25 to 44; 24.3% were from 45 to 64; and 10.8% were 65 years of age or older. The gender makeup of the city was 48.4% male and 51.6% female.

=== 2000 census ===
As of the census of 2000, there were 21,730 people, 7,945 households, and 5,807 families living in the city. The population density was 1,622.2 inhabitants per square mile (626.3/km^{2}). There were 8,411 housing units at an average density of 627.9 per square mile (242.4/km^{2}).

The racial makeup of the city was 91.95% White, 3.85% Black, 0.60% Native American, 0.58% Asian, 0.09% Pacific Islander, 1.08% from other races, and 1.85% from two or more races. Hispanic or Latino of any race were 4.69% of the population.

There were 7,945 households, out of which 40.6% had children under the age of 18 living with them, 56.0% were married couples living together, 12.9% had a female householder with no husband present, and 26.9% were non-families. 22.3% of all households were made up of individuals, and 7.5% had someone living alone who was 65 years of age or older. The average household size was 2.70 and the average family size was 3.15.

The population was spread out, with 30.0% under the age of 18, 8.6% from 18 to 24, 32.6% from 25 to 44, 18.8% from 45 to 64, and 10.1% who were 65 years of age or older. The median age was 33 years. For every 100 females, there were 93.6 males. For every 100 females age 18 and over, there were 90.1 males.

The median income for a household in the city was $45,581, and the median income for a family was $51,268. Males had a median income of $35,518 versus $25,542 for females. The per capita income for the city was $18,572. About 6.5% of families and 7.9% of the population were below the poverty line, including 10.5% of those under age 18 and 4.1% of those age 65 or over.

== Economy ==
=== Largest employers ===
According to the city's 2016 Comprehensive Annual Financial Report, the largest employers in the city are:

| # | Employer | # of Employees |
|---|---|---|
| 1 | QuikTrip Distribution | 1,005 |
| 2 | Belton School District | 637 |
| 3 | Belton Regional Medical Center | 286 |
| 4 | Hy-Vee | 269 |
| 5 | City of Belton | 185 |
| 6 | ROM | 161 |
| 7 | Price Chopper | 150 |
| 8 | Beautiful Savior Home | 150 |
| 9 | Adesa Kansas City | 122 |
| 10 | Home Depot | 112 |

== Education ==
Belton School District #124 includes most of Belton. It operates six elementary schools, two middle schools, and Belton High School.

A portion of eastern Belton is in the Raymore-Peculiar School District.

Metropolitan Community College includes the Belton school district in its taxation area. The Raymore-Peculiar district is in the service area but not the taxation area.

Belton has a public library, a branch of the Cass County Public Library.

== Notable people ==
- Dale Carnegie, author of How to Win Friends and Influence People (parents moved to community when he was adult but he is buried in Belton)
- Emmett Dalton, of the bank-robbing Dalton Gang
- Ben Hardaway, storyboard artist, animator, voice actor, gagman, writer, and director during the Golden Age of American animation
- Kevin Hern, businessman and member of the U.S. House of Representatives for Oklahoma's 1st congressional district
- George Mercer, convicted rapist and murderer executed by lethal injection
- Carrie Nation, leader of the temperance movement
- Tate Stevens, 2012 winner of The X Factor
- Harry S. Truman, 33rd President of the United States
- Brad St. Louis, played 10 seasons with the Cincinnati Bengals in the National Football League

== Sister cities ==
- Manzanillo, Mexico
- Selkirk, Canada
