= National Register of Historic Places listings in Sullivan County, Missouri =

Location of Sullivan County in Missouri

This is a list of the National Register of Historic Places listings in Sullivan County, Missouri.

This is intended to be a complete list of the properties and districts on the National Register of Historic Places in Sullivan County, Missouri, United States. Latitude and longitude coordinates are provided for many National Register properties and districts; these locations may be seen together in a map.

There are 6 properties and districts listed on the National Register in the county.

This National Park Service list is complete through NPS recent listings posted March 14, 2025.

== Current listings ==
	Name on the Register	Image	Date listed	Location	City or town	Description
1	Camp Ground Church and Cemetery		September 23, 1985 (#85002483)	West of Milan; 40°10′38″N 93°18′39″W	Milan	
2	Green City Presbyterian Church	Green City Presbyterian Church	February 10, 2000 (#00000086)	One East St. 40°16′07″N 92°57′10″W	Green City	
3	Green City Railroad Depot	Green City Railroad Depot	January 15, 1999 (#98001610)	202 Lincoln St. 40°16′01″N 92°57′11″W	Green City	
4	Henry Cemetery		December 28, 2005 (#05001472)	Eastern side of Route Z, approximately 1 mile south of Reger; 40°07′43″N 93°11′55″W	Reger	
5	Milan Railroad Depot	Milan Railroad Depot	January 4, 1996 (#95001493)	Junction of E. 3rd St. and Short St. 40°12′09″N 93°06′56″W	Milan	
6	Quincy, Omaha and Kansas City Railroad Office Building	Quincy, Omaha and Kansas City Railroad Office Building	January 7, 1992 (#91001917)	117 N. Water St. 40°12′09″N 93°07′25″W	Milan	

== See also ==
- List of National Historic Landmarks in Missouri
- National Register of Historic Places listings in Missouri
