= Parson Creek =

River in Missouri, United States

Parson Creek is a stream in Sullivan, Linn and Livingston counties of the U.S. state of Missouri. It is a tributary of the Grand River.

The stream headwaters arise in southwestern Sullivan County approximately three miles southeast of Humphreys at 40°05′15″N 93°16′58″W. The stream flows south parallel to Missouri Route DD passing under Missouri Route MM and enters Linn County approximately six miles east of Browning. The stream continues to the south roughly parallel to Missouri Route 139 passing the communities of Shafter and Hecla. It crosses under Route 139 and Missouri Route B 6.5 miles west of Linneus. It continues south passing one mile west of Meadville and crosses under US Route 36. The stream enters the Fountain Grove Conservation Area and crosses into Livingston County to its confluence with the Grand River less than one-half mile south of the Linn-Livingston county line and 1.5 miles east of the community of Bedford at 39°41′55″N 93°20′35″W.

According to tradition, Parson Creek was named for an incident in which a parson drowned in its swollen waters.

== See also ==
- List of rivers of Missouri
