= Missouri Route 139 =

State highway in Missouri, U.S.

Route 139
- MO 139 highlighted in red

Route information
- Maintained by MoDOT
- Length: 108.565 mi (174.718 km)

Major junctions
- South end: US 24 east of Carrollton
- US 36 / Route 110 (CKC) from Laclede to Meadville; US 136 near Lucerne
- North end: CR S40 at the Iowa state line near Powersville

Location
- Country: United States
- State: Missouri

Highway system
- Missouri State Highway System; Interstate; US; State; Supplemental
← Route 138	→ Route 141

Route 139 is a highway in northern and central Missouri. Its northern terminus is at the Iowa state line where it continues as Wayne County Route S40; its southern terminus is at U.S. Route 24 east of Carrollton.

== Major intersections ==
County	Location	mi	km	Destinations	Notes
Carroll	Leta	0.000	0.000	US 24 – De Witt, Carrollton	
Chariton	No major junctions				
Linn	Jefferson Township	34.281	55.170	Route 130 north – Forker	
Linn	Jefferson Township	38.372	61.754	US 36 east / Route 110 (CKC) east / Route 5 – Laclede, Brookfield	Southern end of US 36 / Route 110 overlap
Linn	Jefferson Township	40.264	64.799	Route 130 south – Pershing State Park	
Linn	Parson Creek Township	45.163	72.683	US 36 west / Route 110 (CKC) west / Route W – Fountain Grove, Chillicothe	Northern end of US 36 / Route 110 overlap
Sullivan	Humphreys	69.574	111.968	Route 6 east – Milan	Southern end of Route 6 overlap
Grundy	Liberty Township	72.362	116.455	Route 6 west – Galt	Northern end of Route 6 overlap
Sullivan	No major junctions				
Putnam	Medicine Township	97.345	156.662	US 136 west – Princeton	Southern end of US 136 overlap
Putnam	Medicine–York township line	100.726	162.103	US 136 east – Unionville	Northern end of US 136 overlap
Putnam	York Township	108.565	174.718	CR S40 north	Continuation into Iowa
1.000 mi = 1.609 km; 1.000 km = 0.621 mi: Concurrency terminus
