= Leverton =

Leverton may refer to:

== Places ==
In England

- Leverton, Berkshire, a hamlet
- Leverton, Lincolnshire, a village
- North Leverton with Habblesthorpe, a village and parish in Nottinghamshire
- South Leverton, a village and parish in Nottinghamshire

Elsewhere

- Leverton, Missouri, a community in the United States

== People ==
- Edith Waldemar Leverton (1868–1955), English writer and editor
- Jim Leverton (b. 1946), English musician
- Norm Leverton (1924–2009), Australian rules footballer
- Ruth M. Leverton (1908–1982), American home economist
- Thomas Leverton (c. 1743–1824), English architect

== See also ==
- Laverton (disambiguation)
