= Hecla, Missouri =

Unincorporated community in Missouri, U.S.

Coordinates: 39°56′23″N 93°18′15″W

Hecla is an unincorporated community in northwest Linn County, in the U.S. state of Missouri.

The community is on Missouri Route 139 ten miles north of Meadville and seven miles west of Purdin. Parson Creek flows past one half mile to the east.

== History ==
A post office called Hecla was established in 1894, and remained in operation until 1906. The name may be a transfer from Hekla, a volcano in Iceland.
