= National Register of Historic Places listings in Linn County, Missouri =

Location of Linn County in Missouri

Linn County, Missouri, United States, has 10 properties and districts listed on the National Register of Historic Places, including one National Historic Landmark.

Latitude and longitude coordinates are provided for many National Register properties and districts; these locations may be seen together in a map.

This National Park Service list is complete through NPS recent listings posted September 25, 2026.

== Current listings ==
	Name on the Register	Image	Date listed	Location	City or town	Description
1	Christian Church	Christian Church	March 20, 2025 (#100011559)	116 West Gracia Avenue; 39°42′50″N 92°57′10″W	Marceline	
2	Lincoln School	Lincoln School	March 20, 2025 (#100011560)	210 West Wells; 39°42′37″N 92°57′25″W	Marceline	
3	Linn County Courthouse	Linn County Courthouse	October 14, 1999 (#99001254)	108 High St. 39°52′46″N 93°11′21″W	Linneus	
4	Linn County Jail and Sheriff's Residence		January 16, 2001 (#00001659)	102 N. Main St. 39°52′45″N 93°11′18″W	Linneus	
5	Locust Creek Covered Bridge	Locust Creek Covered Bridge	May 19, 1970 (#70000340)	3 miles (4.8 km) west of Laclede off U.S. Route 36; 39°47′30″N 93°14′03″W	Laclede	Longest of four surviving covered bridges in Missouri
6	Marceline Masonic Lodge #481	Marceline Masonic Lodge #481	March 20, 2025 (#100011561)	201 N. Main Street USA; 39°42′56″N 92°57′01″W	Marceline	
7	Marceline Mercantile & Supply Company	Marceline Mercantile & Supply Company	March 19, 2025 (#100011558)	125 E. California; 39°42′57″N 92°56′55″W	Marceline	
8	Gen. John J. Pershing Boyhood Home	Gen. John J. Pershing Boyhood Home	May 21, 1969 (#69000111)	State and Worlow Sts. 39°47′17″N 93°10′08″W	Laclede	
9	Plum Grove School		October 22, 1994 (#94001203)	County Road 350, 3/8 miles north of its junction with County Road 346; 39°48′48″N 93°12′04″W	Laclede	
10	Uptown Theatre	Uptown Theatre	July 3, 2023 (#100009101)	104 North Main St. U.S.A. (North Kansas Ave.); 39°42′53″N 92°57′04″W	Marceline	

== See also ==
- List of National Historic Landmarks in Missouri
- National Register of Historic Places listings in Missouri
