= Enterprise Township =

Enterprise Township may refer to:

- Enterprise Township, Ford County, Kansas
- Enterprise Township, Reno County, Kansas, in Reno County, Kansas
- Enterprise Township, Michigan
- Enterprise Township, Jackson County, Minnesota
- Enterprise Township, Linn County, Missouri, in Linn County, Missouri
- Enterprise Township, Valley County, Nebraska
- Enterprise Township, Nelson County, North Dakota, in Nelson County, North Dakota
- Enterprise Township, Faulk County, South Dakota, in Faulk County, South Dakota
- Enterprise Township, Moody County, South Dakota, in Moody County, South Dakota
- Enterprise Township, Roberts County, South Dakota, in Roberts County, South Dakota
