= Grantsville =

Grantsville may refer to the following places in the U.S.:

- Grantsville, Maryland
- Grantsville, Missouri
- Grantsville Township, Linn County, Missouri
- Grantsville Formation, a geologic formation in Nevada
- Grantsville, Utah
  - Grantsville National Forest
- Grantsville, West Virginia

== See also ==
- Grantville (disambiguation)
