= Great Pershing Balloon Derby =

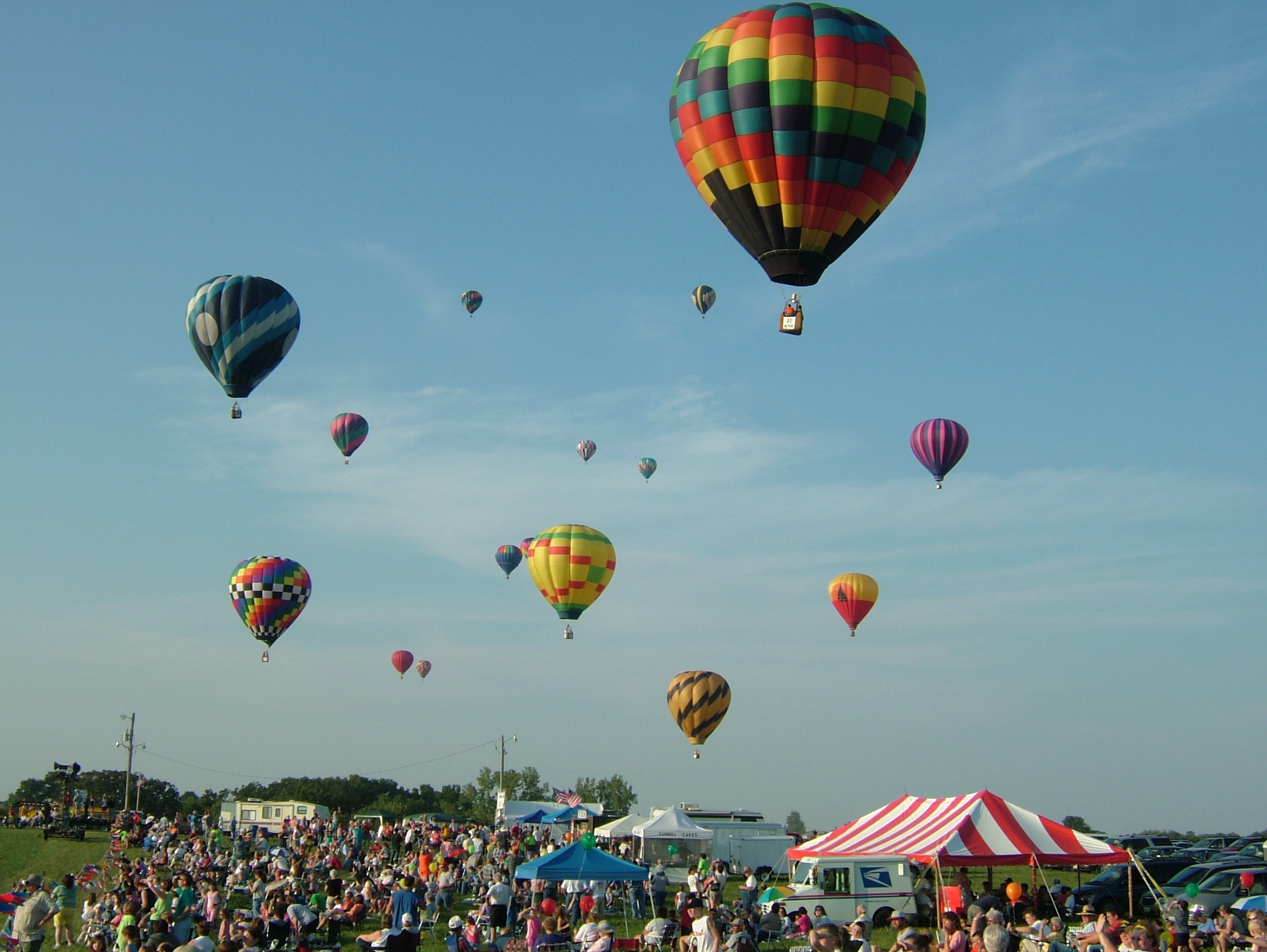
- A day launch at the 2005 derby.
- Begins: Labor Day weekend
- Frequency: Annually
- Location: near Brookfield, Missouri
- Years active: Since 1977
- Inaugurated: September, 1977
- Website: http://www.pershingballoonderby.com

The Great Pershing Balloon Derby is a hot air balloon festival held each Labor Day weekend near Brookfield, Missouri. The three-day festival draws balloonists from the midwest and as far away as Florida and the Pacific Northwest. It is named in honor of General John J. Pershing, leader of the American Expeditionary Forces in World War I and a native of nearby Laclede, Missouri. The Great Pershing Balloon Derby (GPBD) has been recognized as the longest running continually sanctioned ballooning event in the U.S. by the Balloon Federation of America.

== History ==
The derby was first held from September 30 to October 2, 1977 with forty balloons launching from Pershing State Park west of Brookfield. Originally sponsored and organized by the Missouri Department of Natural Resources and the Pershing Memorial Development Association, it was held as a fundraiser for the Pershing Museum. The second year, and every thereafter, the derby was held over Labor Day weekend. By its third year the number of balloons participating nearly doubled to seventy. In years two through eight the Derby was also held at a variety of temporary locations in Linn County.

The 7th annual Great Pershing Balloon Derby was nearly the last, as fundraising and sponsorship problems arose. However, in early 1984 a group of balloonists and concerned area citizens worked together to keep the event going and formed Green Hills Ballooning Inc. to take over the Derby. Beginning in the 9th year, the Derby had a permanent home as well on land provided by the Myron Peacher family. The Missouri DNR returned as a co-sponsor as well, and by 1986 attendance reached a peak of 14,000 spectators. During this time period more activities were added to the weekend schedule such as a queen contest, dances for balloonists and spectators, and a craft festival. The 17th Great Pershing Balloon Derby was the first year in which the Sunday "Night Light" was added to the schedule of events.

2020 saw the 44th be modified. Myron Peacher Memorial Launch Field was closed to fans. The Friday Night South Main Night Flame was cancelled.

== The GPBD today ==
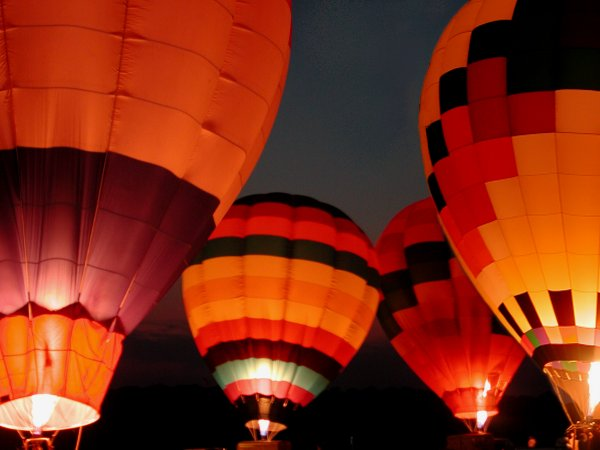
A "night glow" launch from the 2001 Great Pershing Balloon Derby.

The derby itself is held now at the Myron Peacher Memorial Launch Site, an open field on State Road FF about two miles north of U.S. Highway 36 between Brookfield and Laclede. In recent years the number of participating balloons has stabilized at around forty-five. One highlight is the "South Main Night Flame", held in downtown Brookfield. Balloonists and their craft line the street for a night burn. In 2011 and 2012 the derby was selected as site for the BFA North Central Regional Championship. The balloon derby is held in conjunction with many other festivities in nearby Brookfield including beauty contests, concerts, parades, and a fly-in at North Central Missouri Regional Airport. Launches are generally at dusk and dawn on Saturday and Sunday and at dawn on Monday (Labor Day). A night glow is usually held at sunset on Sunday evening.
