= Shelby, Missouri =

Unincorporated community in Missouri, U.S.

Coordinates: 39°58′07″N 93°01′06″W

Shelby is an unincorporated community in north central Linn County, in the U.S. state of Missouri. The community is on Missouri Route V approximately 7.5 miles east of Purdin.

== History ==
A post office called Shelby was established in 1882, and remained in operation until 1904. The community was named after Sheldon "Shelby" Wilson, a local merchant.
