= Fountain Grove =

Fountain Grove may refer to:

- Fountain Grove, California, a former utopian colony; now part of Santa Rosa, called Fountaingrove
- Fountain Grove, Missouri, an unincorporated community
- Fountaingrove Lake, California
