= Missouri Route 130 =

State highway in Missouri, U.S.

Route 130
- MO 130 highlighted in red

Route information
- Maintained by MoDOT
- Length: 6.2 mi (10.0 km)

Major junctions
- South end: Route 139 in Laclede
- North end: US 36 / Route 139 south of Laclede

Location
- Country: United States
- State: Missouri

Highway system
- Missouri State Highway System; Interstate; US; State; Supplemental
← Route 129	→ Route 131

Route 130 is a highway in Linn County, Missouri 6.2 mi (10.0 km) in length. The route is signed in a south–north direction.

== Route description ==
In the south, Route 130 begins at Route 139 in Laclede and heads due west through a rural area. After about 1.9 mi (3.1 km), the highway turns north. Route 130 continues northward for the remainder of its course. It skirts the eastward boundary of Pershing State Park and crosses several creeks before coming to an end at a concurrency between U.S. Route 36 and Route 139.

== History ==
Route 130 was assigned by 1949. However, at the time, the designation only ran a portion of its current length. Between 1974 and 1975, it was extended to its present southern terminus.

== Junction list ==
The entire route is in Laclede, Linn County.

mi	km	Destinations	Notes
0.0	0.0	Route 139	Southern terminus
6.2	10.0	US 36 / Route 139	Northern terminus
1.000 mi = 1.609 km; 1.000 km = 0.621 mi
