= Green City, Missouri =

- City
- Location of Green City, Missouri
- Coordinates: 40°15′50″N 92°57′23″W
- Country: United States
- State: Missouri
- County: Sullivan

Area
  - Total: 1.46 sq mi (3.78 km^{2})
  - Land: 1.43 sq mi (3.71 km^{2})
  - Water: 0.031 sq mi (0.08 km^{2})
- Elevation: 1,056 ft (322 m)

Population (2020)
  - Total: 602
  - Density: 420.7/sq mi (162.43/km^{2})
- Time zone: UTC-6 (Central (CST))
  - Summer (DST): UTC-5 (CDT)
- ZIP code: 63545
- Area code: 660
- FIPS code: 29-29134
- GNIS feature ID: 2394975

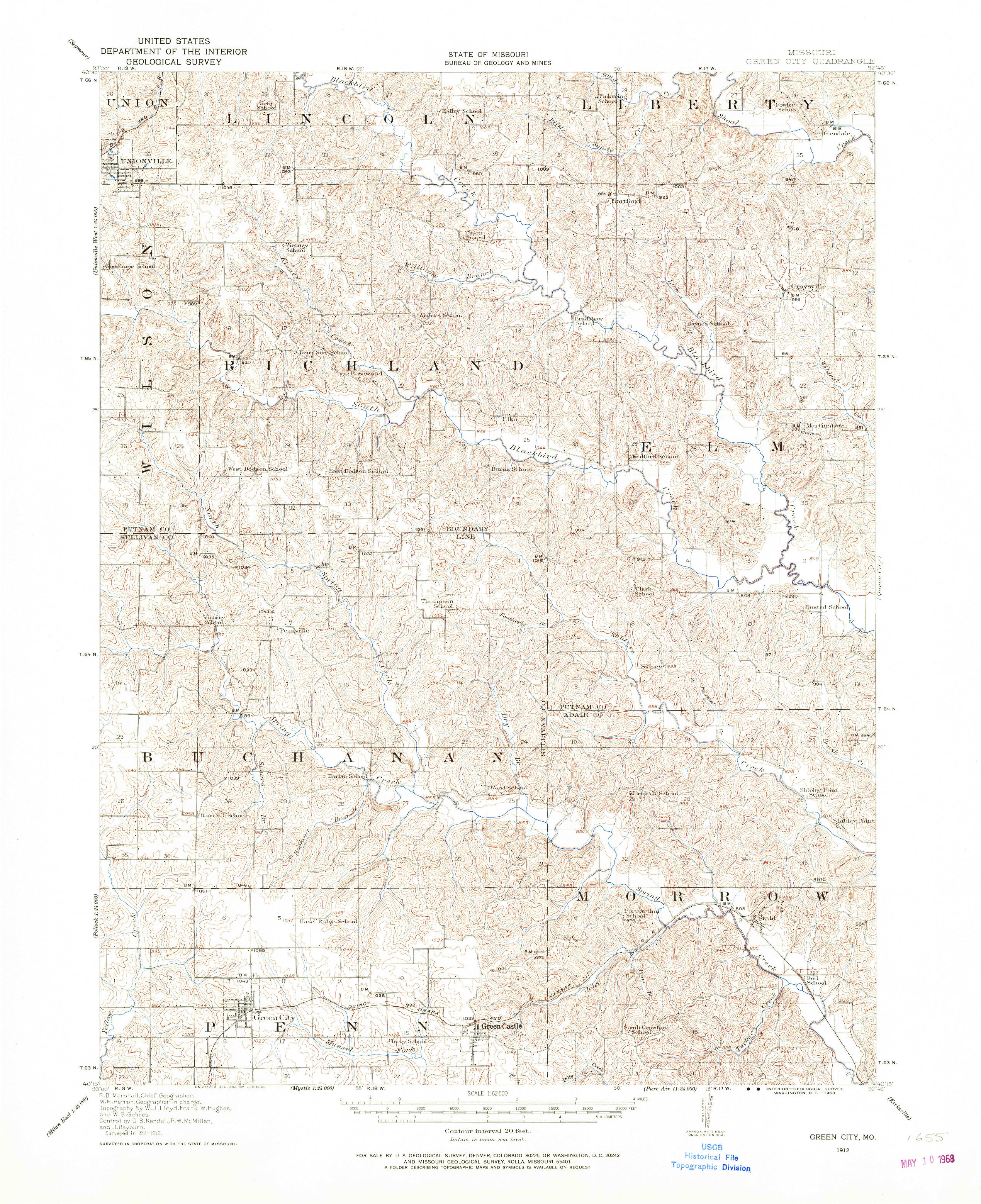
Historical Topographic Map of the North Eastern Part of Sullivan, South Western Part of Putnam, and the North Western Part of Adair County, near Green City Mo. Also shown is part of the Quincy, Omaha and Kansas City Railway.

Green City is a city in northeast Sullivan County, Missouri, United States. As of the 2020 census, Green City had a population of 602.

== Geography ==
The community is located on Missouri Route 129 one half mile north of Missouri Route 6 and ten miles northeast of Milan. Yellow Creek flows past two miles to the west and the Union Ridge Conservation Area on Spring Creek is two miles to the northeast.

According to the United States Census Bureau, the city has a total area of 1.46 square miles (3.78 km^{2}), of which 1.43 square miles (3.70 km^{2}) is land and 0.03 square miles (0.08 km^{2}) is water.

== History ==
Green City traces its beginnings to April, 1880 when Sullivan County farmer Henry Pfeiffer commissioned surveyor Thomas J. Dockery to lay out the town in what had previously been a cornfield. The town plat consisted of fifty lots, each 60 by 130 feet. The impetus for the town was the Quincy, Missouri & Pacific Tailway, which laid tracks close by in the early 1880s. A rail depot was built with donations from area farmers, and in 1881 C. B. Comstock built a store and warehouse. Around the same time a small frame building was moved from the nearby village of Kiddville by S.H. Davis who used it as a post office when he became Green City's first postmaster. Green City was officially incorporated on February 10, 1882.

Green City is the site of Widmark Airport (FAA LID: MO83). Towns the size of Green City, whose population numbered only 688 inhabitants in 2000, usually do not have airports, but Richard Widmark owned a cattle ranch in the area during the 1950s and 1960s. Widmark contributed funds to the construction of an airport which led to its being named in his honor.

Green City Presbyterian Church and Green City Railroad Depot are listed on the National Register of Historic Places.

=== Notable events ===
- May 25, 1885 — Green City College was established. A large three-story brick building was constructed at a cost of $4,500. The first classes were held October 13, 1883 with thirteen students enrolled. By the end of the first term the number had increased to thirty-three, and the second years enrollment totaled eighty. A one-year college preparatory program comprising four terms was offered as well as a full four-year collegiate program.
- June 24, 1918 - A large tornado passed just to the north of Green City. The town proper was spared much damage, however seven people were killed and at least a dozen more injured in the rural areas near the town. Considerable property damage to rural homes and farms also resulted.
- November 5, 1931 — A large fire destroyed much of the east side of the Green City town square. A total of four buildings, housing at least six businesses and the city hall, were a complete loss. The only building left standing was that which housed the Bank of Green City and the Green City Hotel.
- March 26, 1931 — Noted bank robber and "gangster" Fred "Killer" Burke was apprehended near Green City. He had been living there for some time under an assumed name.

== Demographics ==
Historical population
Census	Pop.	Note	%±
1890	318		—
1900	477		50.0%
1910	844		76.9%
1920	905		7.2%
1930	783		−13.5%
1940	697		−11.0%
1950	673		−3.4%
1960	628		−6.7%
1970	632		0.6%
1980	719		13.8%
1990	671		−6.7%
2000	688		2.5%
2010	657		−4.5%
2020	602		−8.4%
U.S. Decennial Census

=== 2010 census ===
As of the census of 2010, there were 657 people, 316 households, and 181 families residing in the city. The population density was 459.4 inhabitants per square mile (177.4/km^{2}). There were 357 housing units at an average density of 249.7 per square mile (96.4/km^{2}). The racial makeup of the city was 93.3% White, 0.3% African American, 0.8% Native American, 0.3% Asian, 3.5% from other races, and 1.8% from two or more races. Hispanic or Latino people of any race were 6.8% of the population.

There were 316 households, of which 25.0% had children under the age of 18 living with them, 40.8% were married couples living together, 12.7% had a female householder with no husband present, 3.8% had a male householder with no wife present, and 42.7% were non-families. 39.6% of all households were made up of individuals, and 17.8% had someone living alone who was 65 years of age or older. The average household size was 2.08 and the average family size was 2.71.

The median age in the city was 45.8 years. 20.5% of residents were under the age of 18; 6.5% were between the ages of 18 and 24; 21.1% were from 25 to 44; 30.6% were from 45 to 64; and 21.3% were 65 years of age or older. The gender makeup of the city was 48.1% male and 51.9% female.

=== 2000 census ===
As of the census of 2000, there were 688 people, 325 households, and 194 families residing in the city. The population density was 481.4 inhabitants per square mile (185.9/km^{2}). There were 380 housing units at an average density of 265.9 per square mile (102.7/km^{2}). The racial makeup of the city was 97.24% White, 0.58% Asian, 0.44% Pacific Islander, 1.60% from other races, and 0.15% from two or more races. Hispanic or Latino people of any race were 7.27% of the population.

There were 325 households, out of which 23.1% had children under the age of 18 living with them, 46.5% were married couples living together, 11.1% had a female householder with no husband present, and 40.3% were non-families. 37.5% of all households were made up of individuals, and 22.8% had someone living alone who was 65 years of age or older. The average household size was 2.12 and the average family size was 2.77.

In the city the population was spread out, with 21.4% under the age of 18, 8.7% from 18 to 24, 22.2% from 25 to 44, 24.6% from 45 to 64, and 23.1% who were 65 years of age or older. The median age was 44 years. For every 100 females, there were 79.2 males. For every 100 females age 18 and over, there were 76.8 males.

The median income for a household in the city was $23,125, and the median income for a family was $27,266. Males had a median income of $23,611 versus $19,609 for females. The per capita income for the city was $14,677. About 11.9% of families and 16.2% of the population were below the poverty line, including 20.9% of those under age 18 and 16.8% of those age 65 or over.
