= Grantville =

Grantville may refer to:

== Places ==
- Grantville, Victoria, Australia
- Grantville, Nova Scotia, Canada
- Grantville, Alberta, Canada
- Grantville, San Diego, California, U.S.
  - Grantville station
- Grantville, California, former name of Lower Lake, California, U.S.
- Grantville, Georgia, U.S.
- Grantville, Greene County, Georgia, U.S.
- Grantville, Kansas, U.S.
- Grantville, Pennsylvania, U.S.

== Fictional entities ==
- Grantville (1632 series), a fictional city in Eric Flint's 1632 series

== See also ==
- Grantsville (disambiguation)
- Granville (disambiguation)
