= Haysville =

Haysville can refer to:

- Haysville, Indiana, United States
- Haysville, Kansas, United States
- Haysville, Pennsylvania, United States
- Haysville, Ontario, Canada

== See also ==
- Haseville, Missouri
