= North Salem, Missouri =

Unincorporated community in Missouri, U.S.

Coordinates: 40°01′53″N 92°59′19″W

North Salem is an unincorporated community in Linn County, in the U.S. state of Missouri.

The community is on a county road approximately one mile (1.6 km) south of the Linn-Sullivan county line and Missouri Route O. Browning is 8.5 miles (13.7 km) west on Route O. West Yellow Creek flows past west of the location.

== History ==
North Salem was originally called Whig Town, and under the latter name was laid out in 1840, and named for the fact a large share of the first settlers were Whigs in politics. The town site was replatted in 1858, and named after Salem, Indiana, the native home of an early settler. A post office called North Salem was established in 1855, and remained in operation until 1953.
