= North Salem =

North Salem is the name of several communities in the United States:

- North Salem, Indiana
- North Salem, Missouri
- North Salem, New Hampshire
- North Salem, New York
- North Salem, Ohio
