= Green City station =

Train station in Missouri, United States

Green City

General information
- Location: 202 Lincoln Street, Green City, Missouri 63545
- System: Former Burlington Route passenger station
- Platforms: 1

History
- Opened: c. 1880
- Closed: 1950

Services
| Preceding station | Burlington Route | Following station |
|---|---|---|
| Sorrell toward Milan | Milan – Quincy | Greencastle toward Quincy |
- Green City Railroad Depot
- U.S. National Register of Historic Places
- Location within Missouri Location within the United States
- Location: 202 Lincoln St., Green City, Missouri
- Coordinates: 40°16′1″N 92°57′11″W
- Area: less than one acre
- Architectural style: Stick/eastlake, Standardized railroad depot
- NRHP reference No.: 98001610
- Added to NRHP: January 15, 1999
Location

Green City station is a historic train station located at Green City, Sullivan County, Missouri. It was built about 1880 by the Quincy, Missouri, and Pacific Railroad. It is a 1 1/2-story, rectangular frame building with Stick style design elements. The gable roofed building features a central three sided hipped dormer that projects over a projecting bay window. The depot remained in operation until 1950.

It was listed on the National Register of Historic Places in 1999 as the Green City Railroad Depot.
