= Gen. John J. Pershing Boyhood Home State Historic Site =

Historic house in Missouri, United States

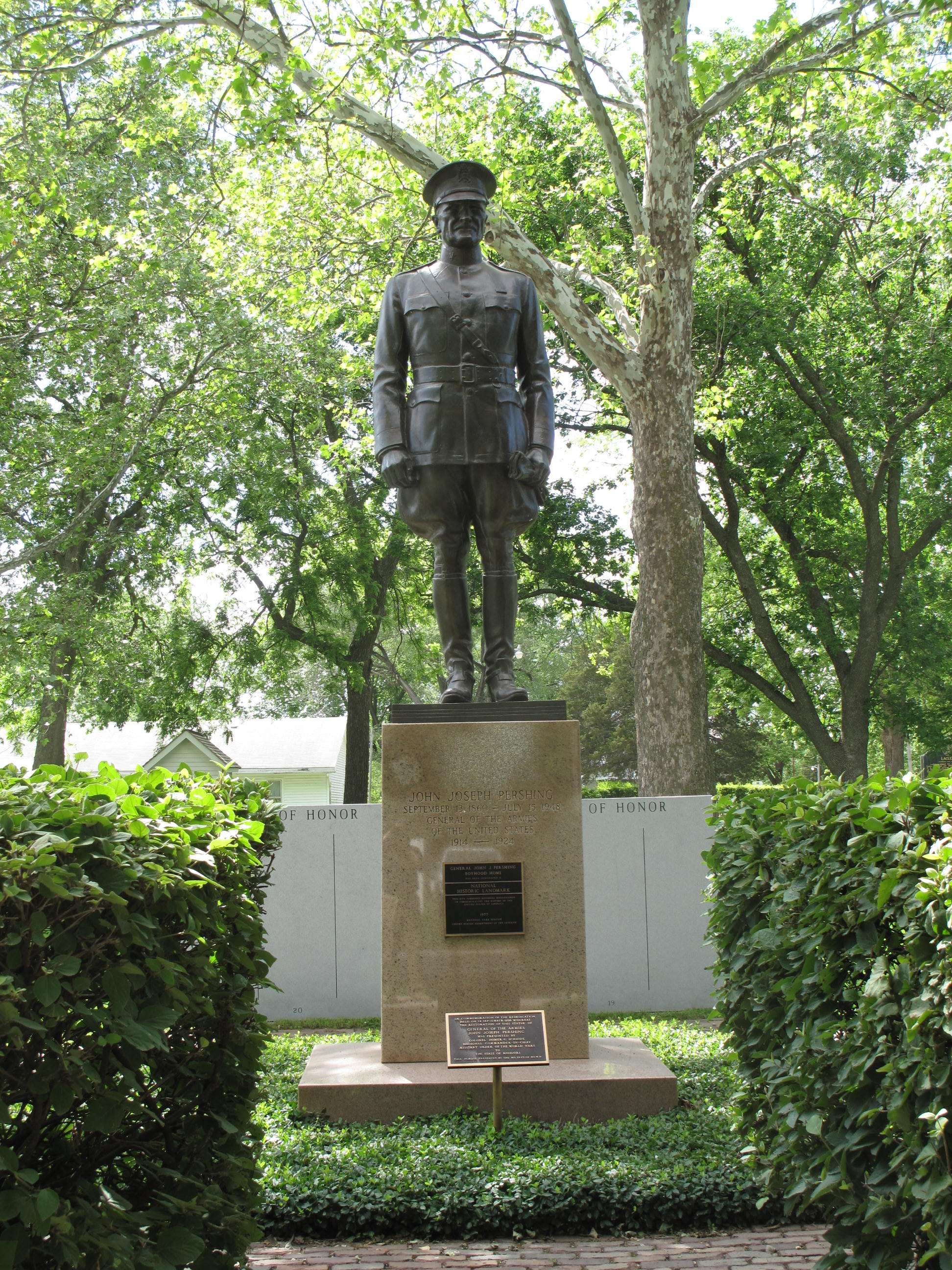

- Location within Missouri Location within the United States
- Location: Laclede, Linn County, Missouri, United States
- Coordinates: 39°47′17″N 93°10′08″W
- Area: 5.71 acres (2.31 ha)
- Established: 1952
- Governing body: Missouri Department of Natural Resources
- Website: Gen. John J. Pershing Boyhood Home State Historic Site
- Gen. John J. Pershing Boyhood Home
- U.S. National Register of Historic Places
- U.S. National Historic Landmark
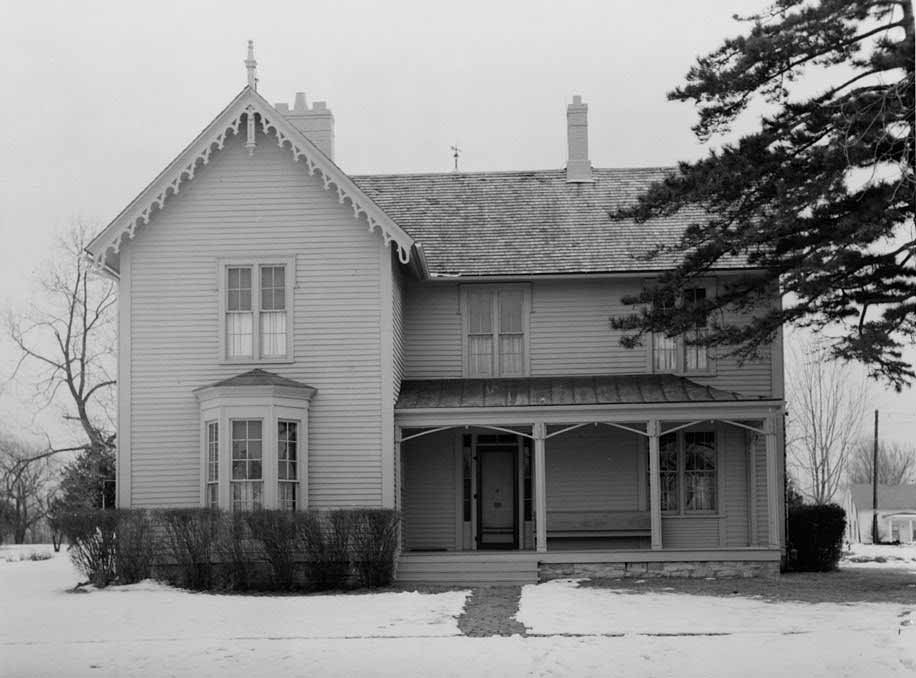
- General John J. Pershing Boyhood Home
- Built: 1857
- Architectural style: Gothic Revival
- NRHP reference No.: 69000111

Significant dates
- Added to NRHP: May 21, 1969
- Designated NHL: May 11, 1976

Gen. John J. Pershing Boyhood Home State Historic Site in Laclede, Missouri, is maintained by the Missouri Department of Natural Resources as a state historic site. General John Joseph "Jack" Pershing led the American Expeditionary Forces in World War I and attained the rank of General of the Armies. Pershing was born on a farm outside Laclede, but lived in the home from age six to adulthood. The historic site preserves and interprets the boyhood home and the one-room Prairie Mound School at which he taught for a year before attending West Point Military Academy. The home has been listed on the National Register of Historic Places since 1969, and was designated a National Historic Landmark in 1976.

== History ==
The Gothic Revival style home was constructed circa 1857, and purchased by the Pershing family in 1866. Pershing remained in the home after completing high school, taking a teaching position at nearby Prairie Mound School until he left to attend the First District Normal School in Kirksville, Missouri. After graduating he returned to Laclede and taught at the Prairie Mound School again until being accepted to West Point.

The Pershing home was acquired by the state of Missouri in 1952 when it was learned the owner at that time was intending to raze the building. On September 13, 1960, as part of a national centennial celebration of Pershing's birth, the home was officially dedicated in his memory and the soldiers who served under him.

== Activities and amenities ==
The home features period-specific furniture from the mid- and late-1800s as well as a small museum chronicling the life of Pershing. A few steps away, the restored Prairie Mound school also offers interpretive displays. Tours are available. The garden features a Wall of Honor with the names of war veterans as well as a life-size statue of Pershing (pictured at right) created in the 1950s by sculptor Carl Mose.

== See also ==
- Pershing State Park
- Locust Creek Covered Bridge State Historic Site
- List of National Historic Landmarks in Missouri
- National Register of Historic Places listings in Linn County, Missouri
