= Garner, Missouri =

Unincorporated community in Missouri, U.S.

Coordinates: 39°57′57″N 92°58′36″W

Garner is an unincorporated community in northern Linn County, in the U.S. state of Missouri.

The community is on Missouri Route CC approximately one mile north of the junction of Missouri routes C and 11. The site is on a ridge between the east and west branches of Yellow Creek.

== History ==
A post office called Garner was established in 1899, and remained in operation until 1903. The community has the name of the local Garner family.
