= Shafter =

Shafter can refer to:

== People ==
- James McMillan Shafter (1816–1892), American politician
- William Rufus Shafter, U.S. officer during the Spanish–American War

== Places ==
United States

- Shafter, California, in Kern County
- Shafter, Illinois
- Shafter, Missouri
- Shafter, Texas
- Fort Shafter, Hawaii
