= Yellow Creek Township, Linn County, Missouri =

Township in Missouri, U.S.

Coordinates: 39°49′11″N 92°59′31″W

Yellow Creek Township is a township in southern Linn County, in the U.S. state of Missouri.

The township is named after the stream called Yellow Creek, a tributary of the Grand River.
