= William Boner =

William Boner may refer to:

- Bill Boner (born 1945), former mayor of Nashville, Tennessee
- William H. Boner (1863–1925), Washington state businessman and politician

== See also ==
- William Bonner (disambiguation)
