= Sedgwick, Missouri =

Unincorporated community in Missouri, U.S.

Coordinates: 40°00′30″N 92°54′20″W

Sedgwick is an unincorporated community in Linn County, in the U.S. state of Missouri.

== History ==
A post office called Sedgwick was established in 1874, and remained in operation until 1903. The community has the name of John Sedgwick, an officer in the Civil War.
