= Eversonville, Missouri =

Unincorporated community in Missouri

Coordinates: 39°54′32″N 93°21′36″W

Eversonville is an unincorporated community in western Linn County, in the U.S. state of Missouri.

The community is on Missouri Route BB adjacent to the Linn-Livingston county line. Linneus is nine miles to the east-southeast.

== History ==
A post office called Eversonville was established in 1878, and remained in operation until 1906. The community was named after Charles H. Everson, the proprietor of a local country store.
