= Locust Creek Covered Bridge State Historic Site =

Historic site in Missouri, United States

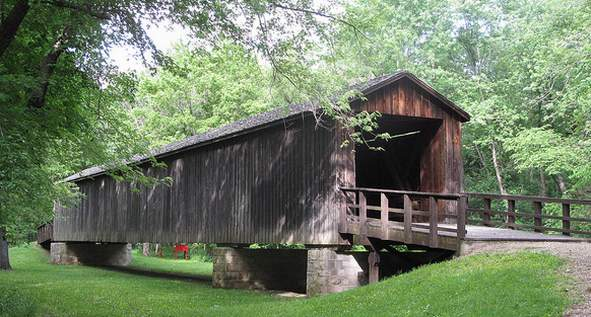

- Location within Missouri Location within the United States
- Location: Linn County, Missouri, United States
- Nearest city: Meadville
- Coordinates: 39°47′30″N 93°14′03″W
- Area: 32.22 acres (13.04 ha)
- Established: 1968
- Visitors: 6,307 (in 2022)
- Operator: Missouri Department of Natural Resources
- Website: Locust Creek Covered Bridge; State Historic Site
- Locust Creek Covered Bridge
- U.S. National Register of Historic Places
- Nearest city: Meadville, Missouri
- Area: 9.9 acres (4.0 ha)
- Built: 1868
- Built by: Bishop & Eaton
- NRHP reference No.: 70000340
- Added to NRHP: May 19, 1970

Locust Creek Covered Bridge State Historic Site is a publicly owned property in Linn County, Missouri, maintained as a state historic site by the Missouri Department of Natural Resources. Also called the Linn County Bridge, the covered bridge is located about 3 miles (4.8 km) east of Meadville, Missouri. At a length of 151 feet (46 m) with a width of 16 ft 8 in (5.08 m) it is the longest of the four remaining covered bridges in the state of Missouri. It was listed on the National Register of Historic Places in 1970.

== History ==
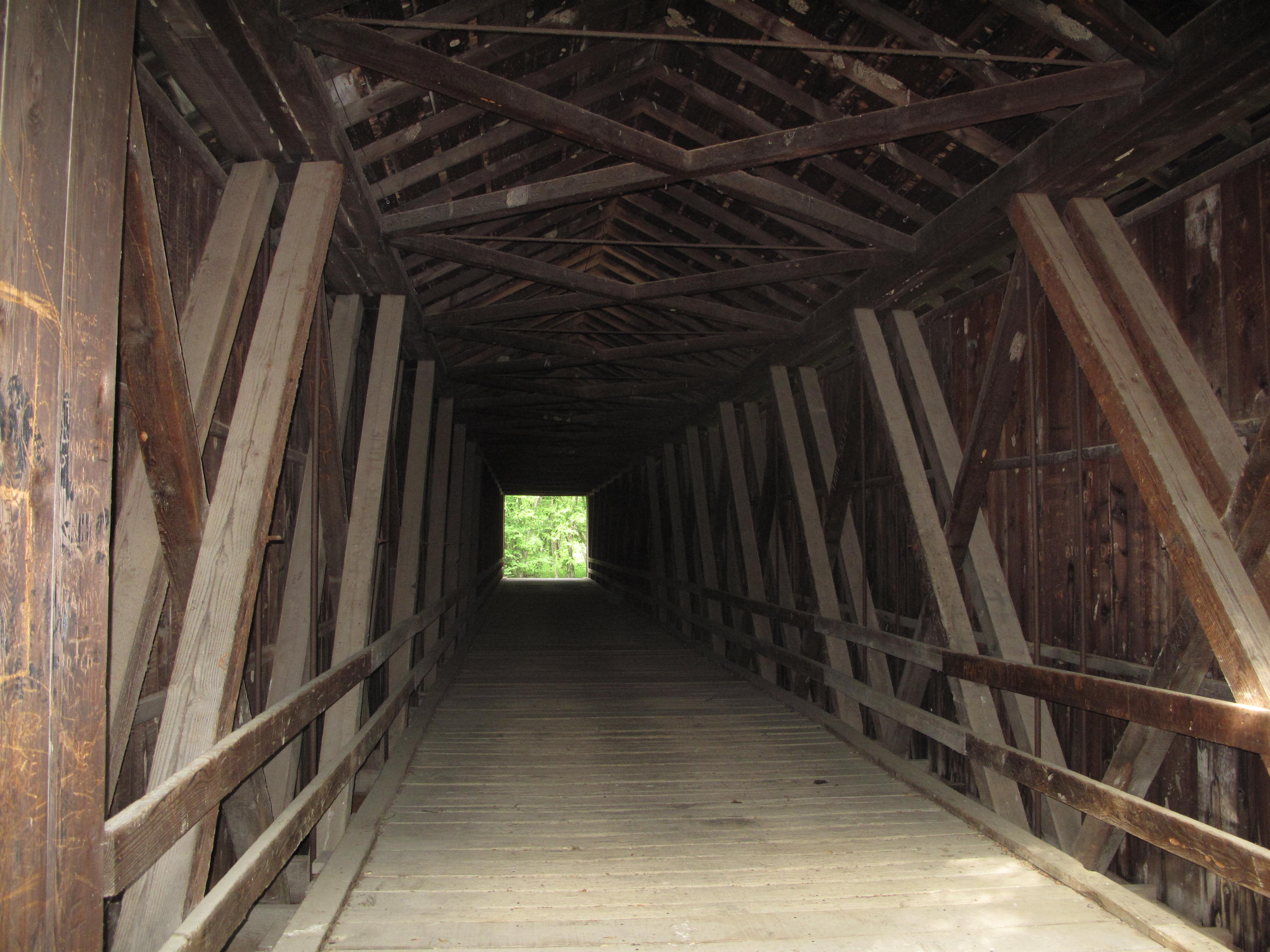
Interior view of the bridge

In August 1868, a contract was awarded by the Linn County Commissioners to Bishop & Eaton for a bridge across Locust Creek, with the cost not to exceed 5,500 dollars. The structure is a Howe truss, constructed of white pine. Vertical iron rods tightly secure diagonal wooden beams to the bottom and top of the structure. In addition to its utilitarian function, over time the bridge was a hangout for locals with some proclaiming their love for one another and their presence at the bridge with carvings along the bridge's internal walls. As a popular fishing and swimming spot, the bridge was visited by John J. Pershing; his boyhood home and the state park bearing his name are nearby.

At first used only for wagon, horse, and pedestrian traffic, in the early 20th century the bridge came to be used for automotive traffic as part of Missouri Route 8. It was bypassed with the completion of U.S. Route 36 in 1930. The bridge also runs parallel to the Hannibal and St. Joseph Railroad. After World War II, the course of Locust Creek was changed and the bridge spanned a dry creek bed. Over time the creek bed filled with silt, leaving the bridge resting on mud much of the time.

In 1968, the State of Missouri acquired the bridge and established the Locust Creek Covered Bridge State Historic Site, then repaired the bridge, replacing its roof, sheeting, and flooring. The Missouri Department of Conservation undertook another major improvement in 1991, raising the bridge by six feet to protect the wooden frame and flooring from the marshy ground.
