= Lowell, Missouri =

Unincorporated community in Missouri, U.S.

Coordinates: 39°51′05″N 93°21′17″W

Lowell is an unincorporated community in Linn County, in the U.S. state of Missouri.

== History ==
A post office called Lowell was established in 1896, and remained in operation until 1901. It is unclear why the name Lowell was applied to this community.
