= Brookfield Township, Linn County, Missouri =

Township in Missouri, U.S.

Coordinates: 39°46′21″N 93°04′21″W

Brookfield Township is a township in southern Linn County, in the U.S. state of Missouri.

Brookfield Township is named after the city of Brookfield.
