= Plum Grove School =

- U.S. National Register of Historic Places
- Location within Missouri Location within the United States
- Location: County Road 350, 3/8 miles north of its junction with County Road 346, near Laclede, Missouri
- Coordinates: 39°48′48″N 93°12′4″W
- Area: 1 acre (0.40 ha)
- Built: c. 1905
- Architectural style: One-Room School House
- NRHP reference No.: 94001203
- Added to NRHP: October 22, 1994

Plum Grove School is a historic one-room school located near Laclede, Linn County, Missouri. It was built about 1905, and is a one-story, gable end, frame building. Also on the property is a contributing coal house with woodshed. The school closed in 1947.

It was added to the National Register of Historic Places in 1994.
