= Shafter, Missouri =

Unincorporated community in Missouri, U.S.

Coordinates: 39°59′02″N 93°17′06″W

Shafter is an unincorporated community in northwest Linn County, in the central region of the U.S. state of Missouri. It was named after General William Rufus Shafter, a Union Army general during the American Civil War. The town has a population of approximately 500 residents. The community is on Missouri Route DD one mile east of Missouri Route 139. Parson Creek flows past the west side of the community.

== History ==
Shafter was established in the late 19th century and was primarily a farming community. It is located on the Missouri River and is situationed near the Mark Twain National Forest. A post office called Shafter was established in 1898, and remained in operation until 1906.

== Landmarks ==
The town has several historic buildings and landmarks, including the Shafter Union Church and the Shafter Schoolhouse. The Shafter Union Church, built in 1868, is a registered historic site and is listed on the National Register of Historic Places.

== Events ==
Shafter hosts several events throughout the year, including the annual Shafter Homecoming Celebration and the Shafter Community Picnic.
