= USS LST-900 =

Ship in the US Navy

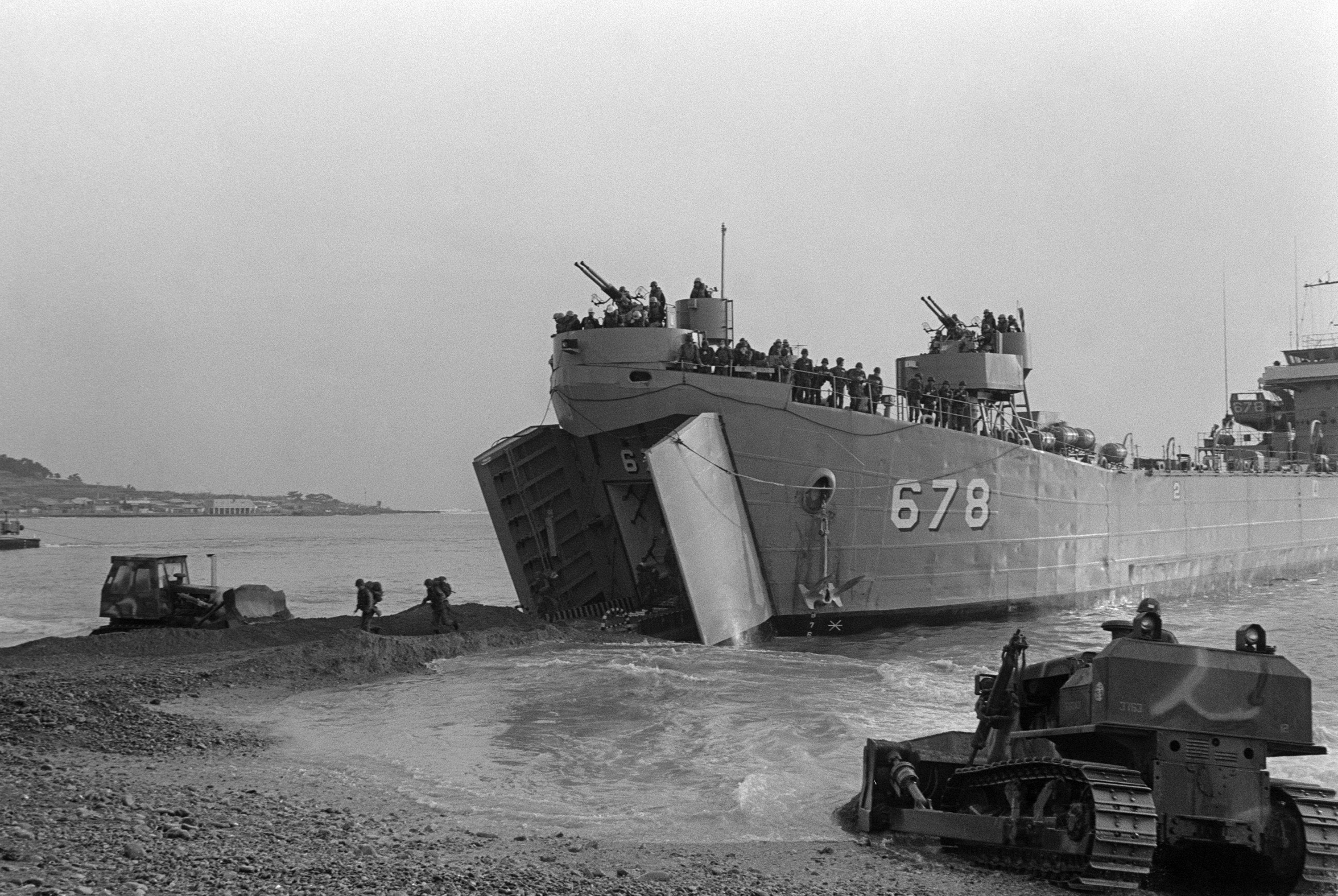
- South Korean Marines offload from Buk Han (LST-678) during the amphibious assault portion of the joint US/South Korean exercise Team Spirit 87

History

United States
- Name: USS Linn County (LST-900)
- Laid down: 1 October 1944
- Launched: 9 December 1944
- Commissioned: 6 January 1945
- Decommissioned: 15 May 1946
- Fate: Transferred to South Korea, 2 December 1958
- Stricken: 8 February 1959
- Honours and awards: One battle star

South Korea
- Name: Buk Han; (북한)
- Acquired: 2 December 1958
- Status: In service, as of 1999

General characteristics
- Class & type: LST-542-class LST
- Displacement: 1,490 tons (light); 4,080 tons (full load of 2,100 tons)
- Length: 328 ft (100 m)
- Beam: 50 ft (15 m)
- Draft: 8 ft (2.4 m) forward; 14 ft 4 in (4.37 m) aft (full load)
- Propulsion: Two diesel engines, two shafts
- Speed: 10.8 knots (20 km/h) (max); 9 knots (17 km/h) (econ)
- Complement: 7 officers, 204 enlisted
- Armament: 8 × 40 mm guns; 12 × 20 mm guns

USS LST-900 was an LST-542-class tank landing ship in the United States Navy during World War II. Late in her career, she was renamed Linn County (LST-900)—after counties in Iowa, Kansas, Missouri, and Oregon—but saw no active service under that name.

LST-900 was laid down on 1 October 1944 at Pittsburgh, Pennsylvania, by the Dravo Corporation; launched on 9 December 1944; sponsored by Mrs. Felix R. Konkle; and commissioned on 6 January 1945.

After completing shakedown off Florida she loaded cargo at New Orleans and sailed for the west coast on 9 February. Arriving at San Francisco on 6 March, she departed 2 days later for Pearl Harbor where she arrived the 17th and began amphibious landing exercises. She cleared Hawaii 24 May; steamed in convoy via Eniwetok, Guam, and Saipan; and reached Okinawa, Ryukyus, 26 June. During the next 2 weeks she discharged cargo and ammunition at Okinawa and Kerama Retto, and, after embarking medical officers and corpsmen, sailed for the Marianas 10 July. She arrived Guam the 16th, thence steamed to Saipan to transport Seabees to the Ryukyus. She debarked her passengers at Ie Shima on 7 August and departed for Saipan 2 days before the end of hostilities.

Between 3 and 9 September LST-900 steamed from Saipan to Leyte Gulf, Philippines. On the 19th she reached Batangas, Luzon and after embarking Army engineers departed in convoy for Japan 29 September. She reached Tokyo Bay 17 October and discharged occupation troops at Yokohama the next day. On the 28th she departed for the Marianas where she embarked troops at Guam for transfer to the United States. Steaming via Pearl Harbor, she reached Seattle, Washington, 15 December.

LST-900 operated along the west coast during the next few months and decommissioned 15 May 1946. While berthed in the Columbia River with ships of the Pacific Reserve Fleet, she was named Linn County on 1 July 1955.

Linn County was leased to the Republic of Korea on 2 December 1958, stricken from the U.S. Naval Vessel Register on 8 February 1959, and sold to Korea on 15 November 1974.

LST-900 earned one battle star for World War II service.

== ROKS Buk Han ==
The ship was transferred to the Republic of Korea on 2 December 1958, and renamed ROKS Buk Han (LST-815). She was later redesignated LST-678. She retired on 29 December 2005.
