= Locust Creek Township, Linn County, Missouri =

Township in the American state of Missouri

Locust Creek Township
- Township
- Interactive map of Locust Creek Township
- Coordinates: 39°52′49″N 93°09′14″W
- Country: United States
- State: Missouri
- County: Linn

Population (2018)
  - Total: 515
- Time zone: UTC-6 (Central (CST))
  - Summer (DST): UTC-5 (CDT)

Locust Creek Township is a township in Linn County, in the U.S. state of Missouri.

The township takes its name from Locust Creek, a stream that flows through the area.

== History ==
When Linn County was organized, the county court divided the territory into three municipal townships. The portion lying between Locust Creek and the main branch of Yellow Creek was designated Locust Creek Township. The area west of Locust Creek became Parson Creek Township, and the remainder was named Yellow Creek Township.

Early voting precincts were established in the newly formed townships. The precinct for Locust Creek Township was set at Barbee’s store.

== Geography ==
Locust Creek Township is located in Linn County in north-central Missouri. The township is drained in part by Locust Creek, which gives the civil division its name.

== Demographics ==
According to recent census-derived profiles, the population of Locust Creek Township has been reported in the range of approximately 400 to 500 residents in the early twenty-first century.
