= Haseville, Missouri =

Unincorporated community in Missouri, U.S.

Coordinates: 40°01′35″N 93°19′17″W

Haseville (also spelled Haysville) is an unincorporated community in northwest Linn County, in the U.S. state of Missouri.

The community is on Missouri Route E just west of Missouri Route 139. Little Muddy Creek flows past the west side of the site. Laredo is approximately six miles west in adjacent Grundy County.

== History ==
A post office called Haseville was established in 1879, and remained in operation until 1908. The community derives its name from John Hays, a local merchant.
