= Rothville, Missouri =

- Village
- Location of Rothville, Missouri
- Coordinates: 39°39′14″N 93°03′49″W
- Country: United States
- State: Missouri
- County: Chariton

Area
  - Total: 0.20 sq mi (0.51 km^{2})
  - Land: 0.20 sq mi (0.51 km^{2})
  - Water: 0 sq mi (0.00 km^{2})
- Elevation: 735 ft (224 m)

Population (2020)
  - Total: 63
  - Density: 319.1/sq mi (123.22/km^{2})
- Time zone: UTC-6 (Central (CST))
  - Summer (DST): UTC-5 (CDT)
- ZIP code: 64676
- Area code: 660
- FIPS code: 29-63236
- GNIS feature ID: 2399130

Rothville is a village in northern Chariton County, Missouri, United States. The population was 63 at the 2020 census.

== History ==
Rothville was laid out in 1883. The community derives its name from John Roth, a local merchant. A post office was established at Rothville in 1868.

Famed writer Laura Ingalls-Wilder lived for a short time (1868-1869) on land within the town's borders.

== Geography ==
Rothville is located on Missouri Route E ten miles east of Sumner, six miles northeast of Mendon and six miles southwest of Marceline. East and West Yellow Creeks merge to form Yellow Creek just east of the community. The Atchison Topeka and Santa Fe Railroad line passes the southeast side of the community.

According to the United States Census Bureau, the village has a total area of 0.20 square miles (0.52 km^{2}), all land.

== Demographics ==
Historical population
Census	Pop.	Note	%±
1910	245		—
1920	220		−10.2%
1930	183		−16.8%
1940	180		−1.6%
1950	152		−15.6%
1960	138		−9.2%
1970	131		−5.1%
1980	118		−9.9%
1990	100		−15.3%
2000	93		−7.0%
2010	99		6.5%
2020	63		−36.4%
U.S. Decennial Census

=== 2010 census ===
As of the census of 2010, there were 99 people, 37 households, and 29 families living in the village. The population density was 495.0 inhabitants per square mile (191.1/km^{2}). There were 47 housing units at an average density of 235.0 per square mile (90.7/km^{2}). The racial makeup of the village was 99.0% White and 1.0% from two or more races. Hispanic or Latino of any race were 3.0% of the population.

There were 37 households, of which 43.2% had children under the age of 18 living with them, 59.5% were married couples living together, 13.5% had a female householder with no husband present, 5.4% had a male householder with no wife present, and 21.6% were non-families. 21.6% of all households were made up of individuals, and 2.7% had someone living alone who was 65 years of age or older. The average household size was 2.68 and the average family size was 3.10.

The median age in the village was 33.2 years. 31.3% of residents were under the age of 18; 0.1% were between the ages of 18 and 24; 35.4% were from 25 to 44; 27.4% were from 45 to 64; and 6.1% were 65 years of age or older. The gender makeup of the village was 50.5% male and 49.5% female.

=== 2000 census ===
As of the census of 2000, there were 93 people, 39 households, and 23 families living in the village. The population density was 370.3 inhabitants per square mile (143.0/km^{2}). There were 48 housing units at an average density of 191.1 per square mile (73.8/km^{2}). The racial makeup of the village was 98.92% White, and 1.08% from two or more races.

There were 39 households, out of which 33.3% had children under the age of 18 living with them, 48.7% were married couples living together, 7.7% had a female householder with no husband present, and 38.5% were non-families. 35.9% of all households were made up of individuals, and 17.9% had someone living alone who was 65 years of age or older. The average household size was 2.38 and the average family size was 3.13.

In the village, the population was spread out, with 24.7% under the age of 18, 8.6% from 18 to 24, 34.4% from 25 to 44, 16.1% from 45 to 64, and 16.1% who were 65 years of age or older. The median age was 40 years. For every 100 females, there were 106.7 males. For every 100 females age 18 and over, there were 100.0 males.

The median income for a household in the village was $26,786, and the median income for a family was $27,917. Males had a median income of $26,563 versus $18,125 for females. The per capita income for the village was $10,226. There were 7.4% of families and 10.8% of the population living below the poverty line, including 14.3% of under eighteens and none of those over 64.
