= Pershing State Park =

State park in Missouri, United States

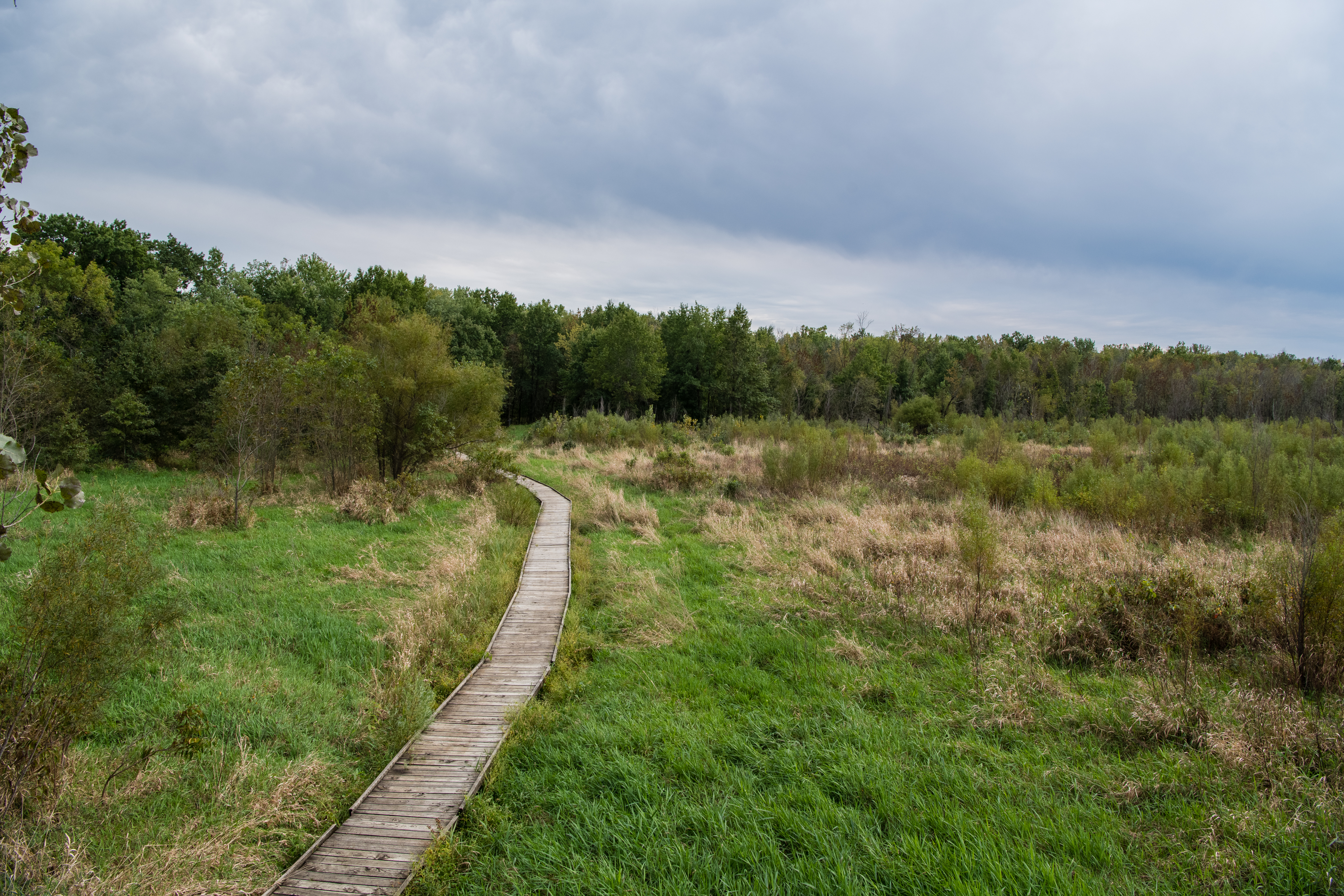
- Boardwalk Trail

- Location within Missouri Location within the United States
- Location: Linn County, Missouri, United States
- Coordinates: 39°46′00″N 93°13′01″W
- Area: 5,362.23 acres (2,170.02 ha)
- Elevation: 689 ft (210 m)
- Established: 1937
- Administrator: Missouri Department of Natural Resources
- Visitors: 67,850 (in 2023)
- Website: Official website

Pershing State Park is a public recreation area covering more than 5,000 acres (2,000 ha) off U.S. Route 36, three miles west of Laclede in Linn County, Missouri. The state park was named in honor of General of the Armies John J. Pershing, who led the United States forces in Europe in World War I and who grew up in Laclede.

== History ==
Long before John Pershing was born, or before any European immigrants reached the midwest, the land that encompasses Pershing State Park was the domain of Native Americans, mostly of the Sac and Fox tribes. The land in northern Missouri was used largely as hunting grounds for the tribes, but a few native settlements were established. Within the boundaries of Pershing State Park are two burial mounds and a former village site. The burial mounds are estimated to be between 1,000 and 2,000 years old.

Pershing State Park had its beginning in 1937 when the State of Missouri purchased a large tract of land, some 1,770 acres, a short distance west of Laclede for $20,000. Since the early 1930s a group from Laclede had petitioned the Federal government to create a national military memorial to Pershing in Linn county. However regulations prevented Congress from doing so for a person still living (Pershing did not die until 1948). A state park was seen as the next best alternative. Pershing's father had owned two farms in the vicinity, and Pershing himself had roamed the area in his youth, hunting and fishing along Locust Creek and within the Locust Creek Covered Bridge State Historic Site.

Once purchased, the park was dedicated in 1940. The land however remained largely unused and undeveloped for several years save for two buildings constructed by the Civilian Conservation Corps just prior to World War II. This lack of overdevelopment would later prove a plus as the meandering Locust Creek—with its wet prairie, marshes, and bottomland forests—reflects the natural wetland state of some northern Missouri lands before agricultural development and the channelization of large creeks and rivers.

== Features ==
The park's War Mothers Memorial honors mothers who have lost their sons in war. It was dedicated in 1940 by the Missouri chapter of the American War Mothers organization. The Locust Creek Covered Bridge State Historic Site is across U.S. Route 36 from the main portion of the park.

== Activities and amenities ==
Much of the park is undeveloped native habitat. Hiking trails include the 1.5-mile-long Boardwalk Trail that winds through shrub swamps, wet prairie, marshland, and bottomland forest. The trail area has been designated an Important Bird Area by the National Audubon Society. The 6-mile-long Locust Creek Riparian Trail links the park to the Fountain Grove Conservation Area. The park also offers camping, fishing and boating on four small lakes, and picnicking facilities.

== See also ==
- Gen. John J. Pershing Boyhood Home State Historic Site
- Great Pershing Balloon Derby
