= Enterprise Township, Linn County, Missouri =

Township in Missouri, U.S.

Coordinates: 40°00′17″N 93°04′10″W

Enterprise Township is a township in northern Linn County, in the U.S. state of Missouri.

Enterprise Township is named after the community of Enterprise.
