= Enterprise, Linn County, Missouri =

Unincorporated community in Missouri, U.S.

Coordinates: 40°01′28″N 93°05′07″W

Enterprise is an unincorporated community in northern Linn County, in the U.S. state of Missouri.

The community is on a county road approximately one mile south of the Linn-Sullivan county line and four miles east of Browning. Upper tributaries of Long Branch flow past the community.

== History ==
Enterprise was originally called Northcutt, and under the latter name was platted in the late 1850s, and named after B. F. Northcutt, the original owner of the town site. Another variant name was "Rodney". A post office called Northcutt was established in 1858, the name was later changed to Rodney, and the post office closed in 1902.
