= Forker, Missouri =

Unincorporated community in Missouri, U.S.

Coordinates: 39°43′09″N 93°11′09″W

Forker is an unincorporated community in southern Linn County, in the U.S. state of Missouri.

The community is on Missouri Route 130 one mile north of the Linn-Chariton county line. The Chicago, Burlington and Quincy Railroad went past the east side of the community.

== History ==
According to tradition, Forker was the name of a railroad official. A variant name was "Boomer Post Office". A post office called Boomer was established in 1883, and remained in operation until 1953.
