= William Bonner =

William Bonner may refer to:

- William Bonner (newscaster) (born 1963), Brazilian newscaster, publicist and journalist
- William Nigel Bonner (1928–1994), British zoologist
- William Ray Bonner (born 1948), perpetrator of a shooting spree in Los Angeles, California, 1973
- Bill Bonner (author) (born 1948), American author of books and articles on economic and financial subjects
- Bill Bonner (politician) (active since 1997), Canadian politician for the Alberta Liberal Party
- William Bonner McCarty, founder of Jitney Jungle

== See also ==
- William Boner (disambiguation)
