= Camp Ground Church and Cemetery =

Historic cemetery in Sullivan County, Missouri, US

- U.S. National Register of Historic Places
- Location within Missouri Location within the United States
- Location: West of Milan, near Milan, Missouri
- Coordinates: 40°10′38″N 93°18′39″W
- Area: 6.9 acres (2.8 ha)
- Built: 1855, 1901
- Architectural style: Classical Revival
- NRHP reference No.: 85002483
- Added to NRHP: September 23, 1985

Camp Ground Church and Cemetery is a historic church and cemetery located near Milan, Sullivan County, Missouri. The church was built in 1901, and is a one-story, Classical Revival style rectangular frame building. It measures 30 feet by 44 feet and rests on a broken ashlar foundation. The cemetery was founded in 1855 as a public burial ground and contains approximately 400 graves.

It was listed on the National Register of Historic Places in 1985.
