= Grantville, Greene County, Georgia =

Coordinates: 33°30′16″N 83°08′28″W

Grantville is an extinct town in Greene County, in the U.S. state of Georgia.

== History ==
The community was named after Daniel Grant, a pioneer citizen.
