= Laverton =

There is more than one place named Laverton:

In Australia:

- Laverton, Victoria is a suburb of Melbourne
  - Laverton railway station, Melbourne
- Laverton, Western Australia is a town in the goldfields of Western Australia
- Shire of Laverton is a local government area in Western Australia

In the United Kingdom

- Laverton, Gloucestershire
- Laverton, North Yorkshire
- Laverton, Somerset
