= York Township, Putnam County, Missouri =

Township in Putnam County, Missouri, U.S.

Coordinates: 40.50°N 93.25°W

York Township is a township in northwestern Putnam County, Missouri.

The organization date and origin of the name of York Township is unknown.
