= Milan station =

Milan

General information
- Location: East 3rd Street, Milan, Missouri 63556
- System: Former Burlington Route passenger station
- Platforms: 1

History
- Opened: 1882
- Closed: 1939

Services
Preceding station	Burlington Route	Following station
Terminus	Milan – Quincy	Sorrell toward Quincy
Boynton toward Burlington	Burlington – Laclede	Cora toward Laclede
- Milan Railroad Depot
- U.S. National Register of Historic Places
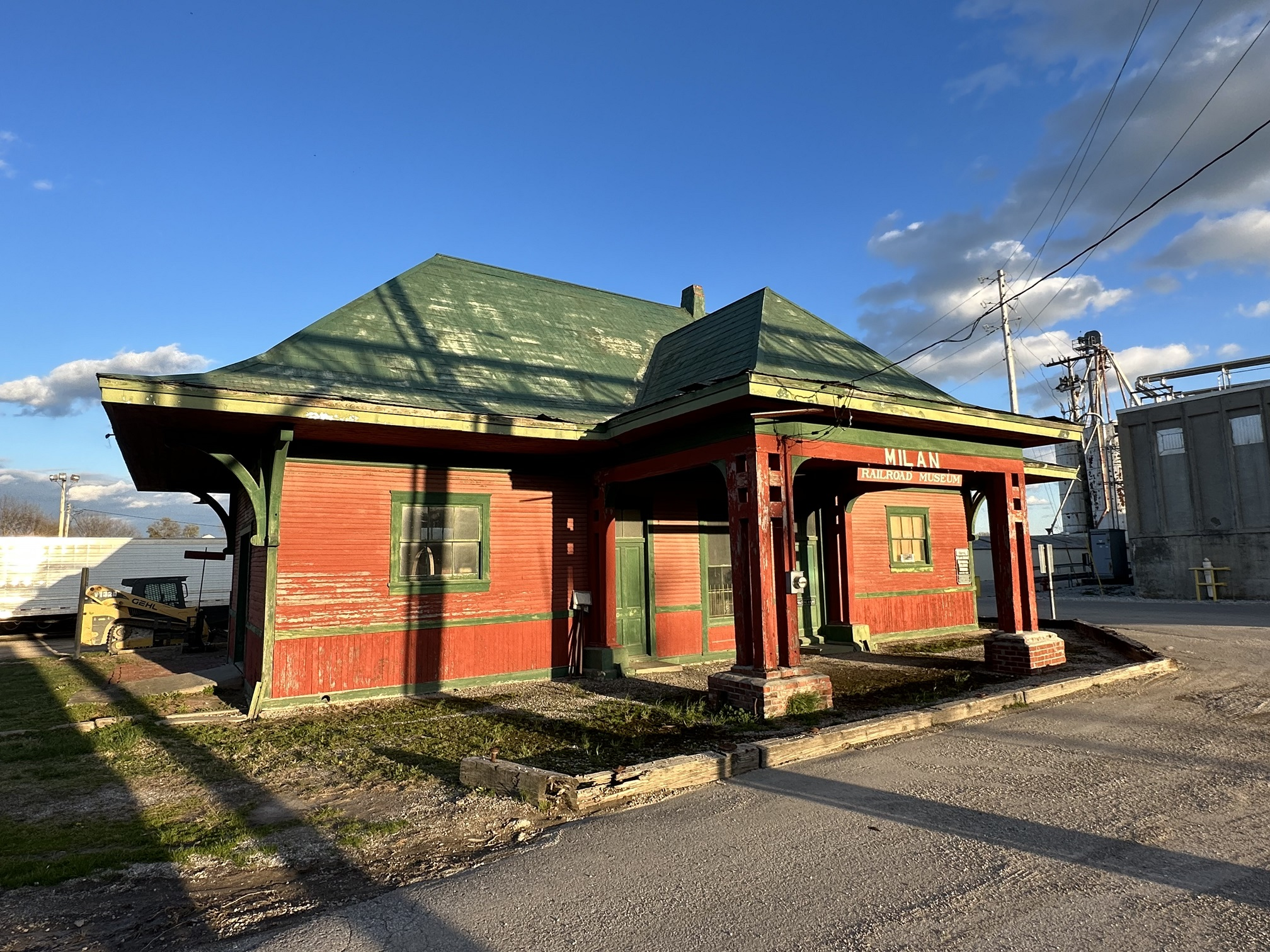
- Milan Railroad Depot in 2024

- Location within Missouri Location within the United States
- Location: Jct. of E. Third St. and Short St., Milan, Missouri
- Coordinates: 40°12′9″N 93°6′56″W
- Area: less than one acre
- Built: 1882
- NRHP reference No.: 95001493
- Added to NRHP: January 4, 1996
Location

Milan station, also known as the Quincy, Missouri & Pacific Railroad Depot, is a historic train station located at Milan, Sullivan County, Missouri, United States. It was built in 1882 by the Quincy, Missouri, and Pacific Railroad. It is a one-story, rectangular frame building with American Craftsman design elements. It features a hipped roof with wide eaves supported by heavy curved brackets and a projecting telegraphers bay. The depot remained in operation until 1939 and is operated by the Sullivan County Historical Society as a railroad museum.

It was listed on the National Register of Historic Places in 1996 as the Milan Railroad Depot.
