= Quincy, Omaha and Kansas City Railroad Office Building =

- U.S. National Register of Historic Places
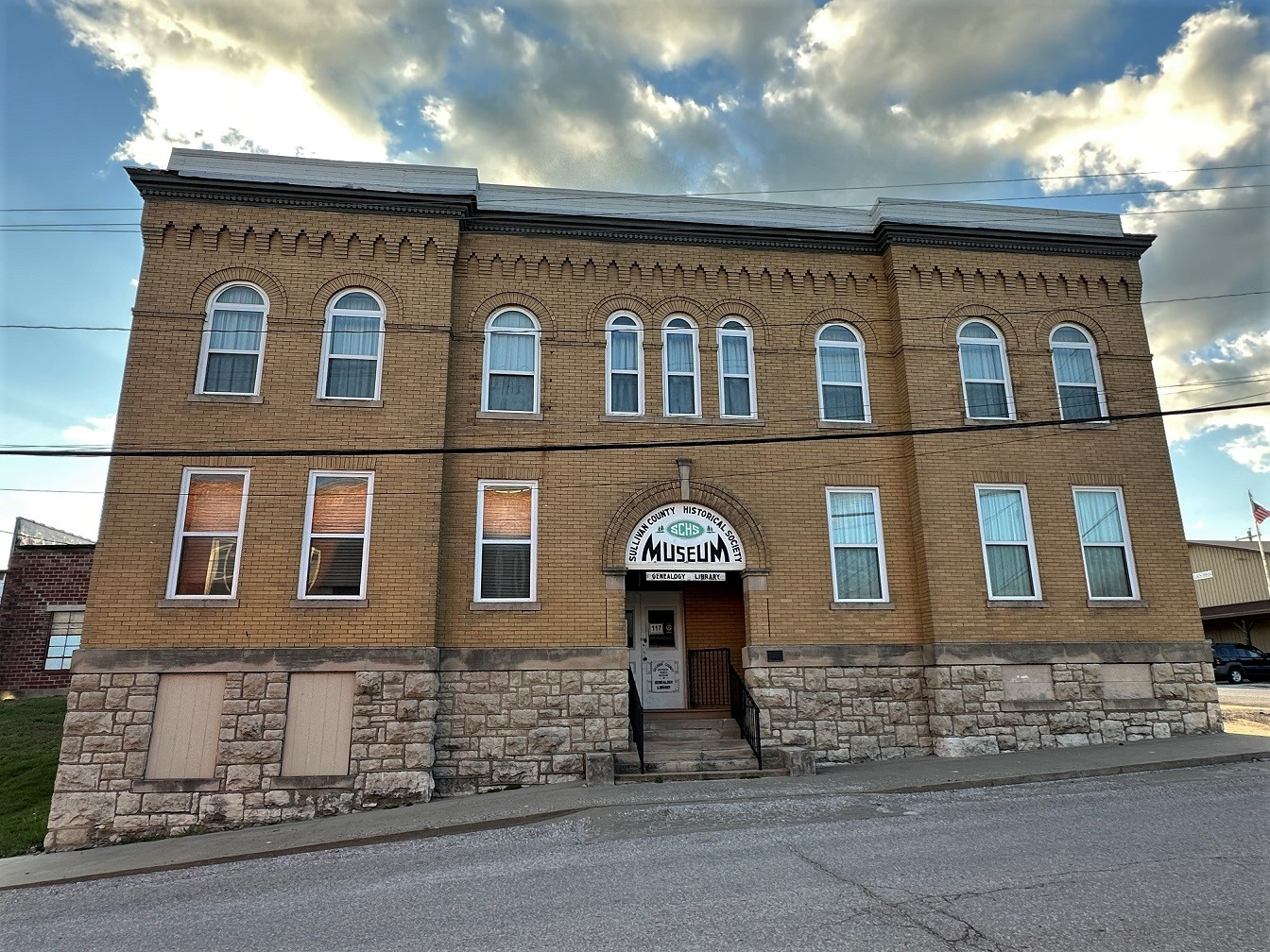

- Location within Missouri Location within the United States
- Location: 117 N. Water St. Milan, Missouri
- Coordinates: 40°12′9″N 93°7′25″W
- Area: less than one acre
- Built: 1898
- Architect: Kern, Emmanuel G.
- Architectural style: Romanesque, Late 19th Century Commercial
- NRHP reference No.: 91001917
- Added to NRHP: January 7, 1992

Quincy, Omaha and Kansas City Railroad Office Building, also known as the O.K. Building and Sullivan County Courthouse, is a historic office building located at Milan, Sullivan County, Missouri. It was built in 1898 by the Quincy, Omaha and Kansas City Railroad. It is a two-story, rectangular brick building on a limestone foundation. It features a Romanesque style round arched entrance and second-story window openings. From 1908 to 1940, the building was used by Sullivan County as a courthouse and served as the seat of government for the county.

It was listed on the National Register of Historic Places in 1992.
