= Grantsville, Missouri =

Unincorporated community in Missouri, U.S.

Coordinates: 39°56′35″N 93°06′49″W

Grantsville is an unincorporated community in Linn County, in the U.S. state of Missouri.

== History ==
A post office called Grantsville was established in 1868, which remained in operation until 1884. The community was named after Ulysses S. Grant, an officer in the Civil War and afterward 18th President of the United States.
