= Fountain Grove, Missouri =

Unincorporated community in Missouri, U.S.

Coordinates: 39°42′39″N 93°18′57″W

Fountain Grove is an unincorporated community in southwest Linn County, in the U.S. state of Missouri.

The community is on Missouri Route W approximately five miles south of Meadville. The Fountain Grove Conservation Area lies adjacent to the community on the south and west. The Grand River flows past one mile to the south in adjacent Livingston County.

== History ==
Fountain Grove was platted in 1871. A post office called Fountain Grove was established in 1875, and remained in operation until 1940.
