= Grantsville Township, Linn County, Missouri =

Township in the American state of Missouri

Coordinates: 39°55′55″N 93°03′55″W

Grantsville Township is a township in Linn County, in the U.S. state of Missouri.

The township was named after Ulysses S. Grant, an officer in the Civil War and afterward 18th President of the United States.
