= Green City Presbyterian Church =

Historic church in Missouri, United States

- U.S. National Register of Historic Places
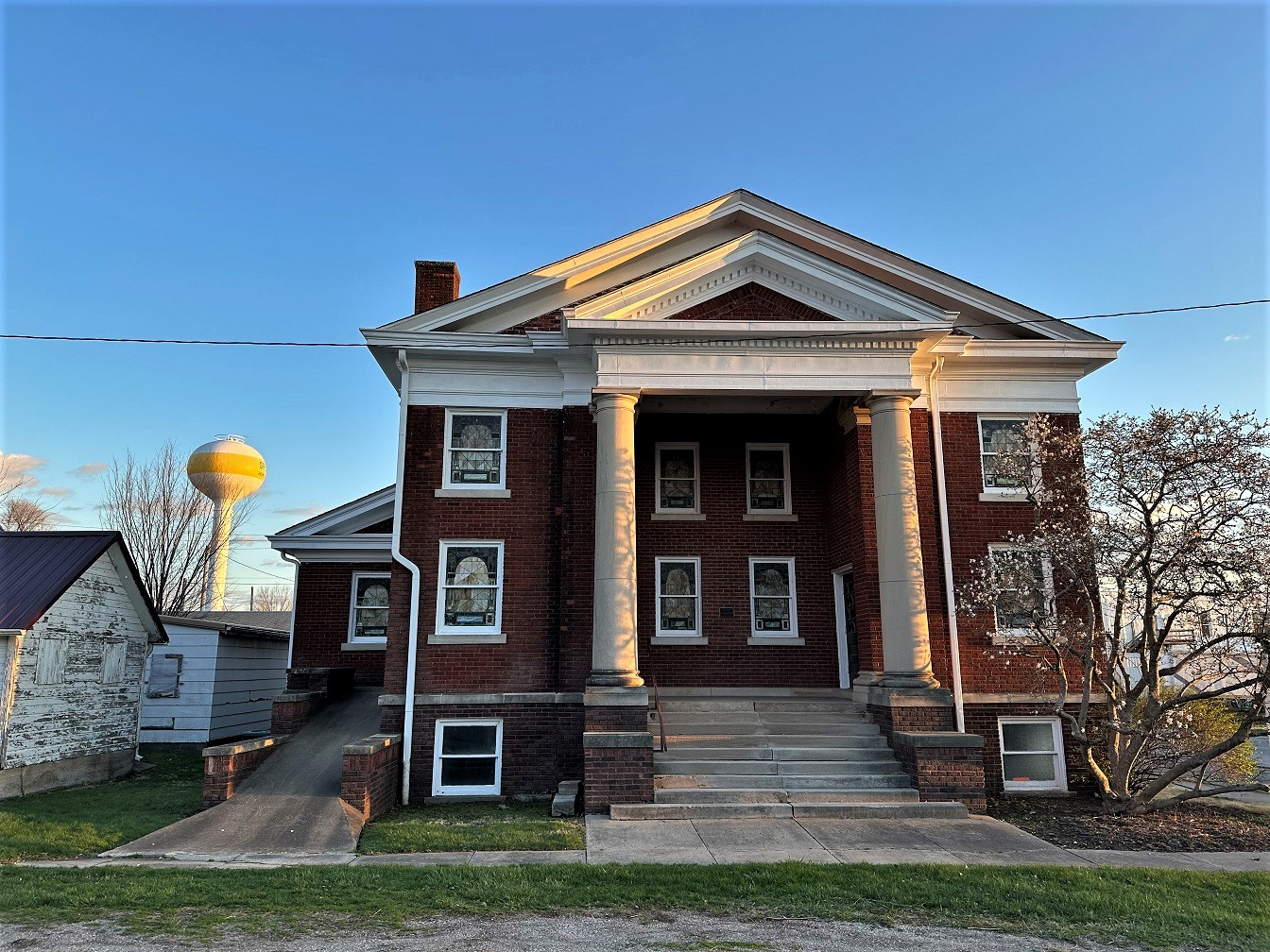
- Green City Presbyterian Church in 2024

- Location within Missouri Location within the United States
- Location: One East St., Green City, Missouri
- Coordinates: 40°16′7″N 92°57′10″W
- Area: less than one acre
- Built: 1918
- Architect: Church, Charles F.
- Architectural style: Classical Revival
- NRHP reference No.: 00000086
- Added to NRHP: February 10, 2000

Green City Presbyterian Church is a historic Presbyterian church at One East Street in Green City, Sullivan County, Missouri. It was built in 1918, and is a two-story, Classical Revival style brick church building. The front facade features a full-height portico supported by limestone Tuscan order columns.

It was listed on the National Register of Historic Places in 2000.
