= Norm Leverton =

Australian rules footballer

Personal information
- Full name: Norm Leverton
- Born: 9 October 1924
- Died: 7 January 2009 (aged 84)
- Original team: Sandringham Centrals
- Height: 182 cm (6 ft 0 in)
- Weight: 76.5 kg (169 lb)

Playing career^{1}
Years	Club	Games (Goals)
1945	Melbourne	2 (0)
- ^{1} Playing statistics correct to the end of 1945.

Norm Leverton (9 October 1924 – 7 January 2009) was an Australian rules footballer who played with Melbourne in the Victorian Football League (VFL).
