= Medicine Township, Putnam County, Missouri =

Township in Putnam County, Missouri, U.S.

Coordinates: 40.428°N 93.25°W

Medicine Township is a township in southwestern Putnam County, Missouri.

The organization date and origin of the name of Medicine Township is unknown.
