= Leverton, Missouri =

Unincorporated community in Missouri, U.S.

Coordinates: 39°56′36″N 93°03′31″W

Leverton is an unincorporated community in Linn County, in the U.S. state of Missouri.

== History ==
A post office called Leverton was established in 1883, and remained in operation until 1901. Leverton Wilcox, an early postmaster, gave the community his first name.
