= William H. Boner =

Washington state politician and businessman (1863–1925)

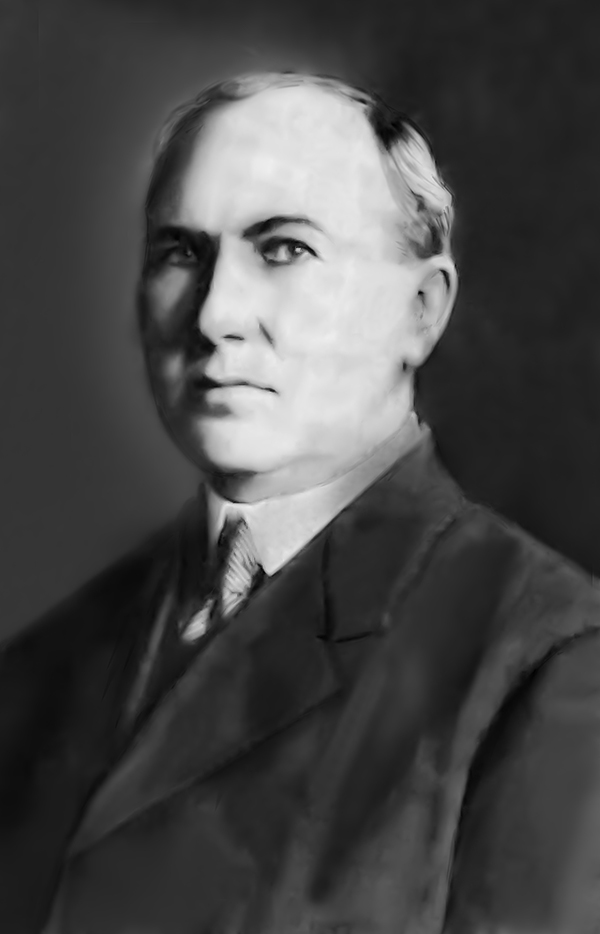
- Born: January 23, 1863; Milan, Missouri
- Died: February 7, 1925 (aged 62); Everett, Washington
- Occupations: South Bend, Washington Councilman; South Bend mayor; manager in lumber companies
- Known for: Was councilman and mayor of South Bend, Washington and director of the First National Bank in Everett, Washington. He managed and developed U.S. lumber companies: the Simpson Lumber Company and the Weyerhaeuser Lumber Company.
- Political party: Republican
- Spouse: Tennessee Winters (married 1885, or 1888)
- Children: 2
- Parents: Henry Boner (father); Mary Boner (Smith) (mother)

William H. Boner (January 23, 1863 – February 7, 1925) was a Washington State politician and lumber businessman. He served as a South Bend councilman for six years and was elected mayor several times.

Boner dedicated the majority of his life to the lumber business. After college, he established his own retail lumber yard in Milan, Missouri, but later took a position in the Excelsior Lumber Company. In 1889, Boner came to the Pacific coast and worked for the Northwestern Lumber Company, first in Hoquiam, Washington, and then in charge of the branch firm in South Bend, Washington. Boner stayed in charge after the branch firm became the Simpson Lumber Company. Boner developed and expanded the South Bend pioneer mill, and later the Weyerhaeuser Lumber Company mills in Everett. Under his supervision, the Weyerhaeuser Lumber Company supplied lumber storage across the U.S.

By 1917, Boner had become the director of the Everett First National Bank.

== Early life, family, and education ==
William Boner was born on January 23, 1863, in Milan, Missouri. His mother was Mary Boner (Smith), born in Pennsylvania. His father, Henry Boner, was an emigrant from Indiana who came to Milan and worked there as a merchant and postmaster. He served in the Civil War as a member of a Missouri volunteers regiment. The parents had two children: William H. and John Boner. The family lived on a farm, and later moved to town so the children could receive secondary education. While attending school, Boner worked at the post office assisting his father, and later went to study at a commercial college in Burlington, Iowa.

== Career ==
=== Lumber business ===
After finishing college, Boner returned home and entered the lumber business. He established his own retail lumber yard in Milan, Missouri, but later took a position in the Excelsior Lumber Company, where he worked for four years. At first, his position was bookkeeper, and later he became a manager in different branch houses in Nebraska and other neighboring states. In 1889, Boner came to the Pacific coast, and a year later took a position with the Northwestern Lumber Company in Hoquiam, Washington. He worked there for several months and then was transferred to South Bend to manage the city's first mill. In 1900, the ownership and management of the branch plant changed, and it became the Simpson Lumber Company. Boner continued working there as a general manager for seventeen years. During his time in charge, the mill expanded and became widely known across the coast.

In 1907, Boner became a manager for the Weyerhaeuser Lumber Company in Everett, Washington. Under Boner's supervision, the company expanded to hundreds of employees, a vastly increased production of lumber, and two large mills, one of them being 500 ft × 300 ft (152 m × 91 m) in size. The mills supplied lumber yards in other states, including Iowa, Illinois, Missouri, South Dakota, and Minnesota. During his service as manager, Boner was a member of the Pacific Coast Lumber Manufacturers' Association, actively participating in monthly meetings and discussions, in regard to the American lumber business.

=== Political activity ===
Besides the lumber business, Boner was a Republican member of the South Bend Council, elected in 1892. He served in the position for six years, and was elected mayor of the city several times.

=== Other positions ===
Living in Everett, Washington, Boner was involved in financial affairs. In 1917, he was director of the Everett First National Bank.

== Personal life and death ==
William Boner married Tennessee Winters in Milan, Missouri, according to one source in 1885, and to another, 1888. They had two daughters: Beatrice, born in Milan, and I'Lee, born in Everett.

Boner was a member of the Cascade Club, the Everett Golf and Country Club, and a supporter of the Commercial Club.

He died on February 7, 1925, in Everett, Washington, after a protracted illness.

== See also ==
- South Bend, Washington
- Simpson Investment Company
- Weyerhaeuser

== Literature cited ==
- "South Bend politics", Seattle Post-Intelligencer, Seattle: Leigh S. J. Hunt, p. 3, December 3, 1892, ISSN 2379-7304, LCCN sn83045604, OCLC 9563195
- "South Bend goes Republican", Seattle Post-Intelligencer, vol. 23, no. 26, Seattle: Leigh S. J. Hunt, p. 1, December 10, 1892, ISSN 2379-7304, LCCN sn83045604, OCLC 9563195
- Barns, William Eddy, ed. (November 15, 1909), "Meeting the Pacific Coast Lumber Manufacturers' Association", St. Louis Lumberman, vol. 44, no. 10, St. Louis: Kriechbaum Publishing Company, p. 60, LCCN 27009839, OCLC 243888753
- "Notes from America's Lumber Centers", American Lumberman, no. 2266, Chicago: Elmer C. Hole, p. 63, October 19, 1918, ISSN 0096-4425, LCCN sn80000563, OCLC 1916285
- "Commissions reward the persistent", American Lumberman, no. 2269, Chicago: Elmer C. Hole, p. 41, November 9, 1918, ISSN 0096-4425, LCCN sn80000563, OCLC 1916285
- "Notes from America's Lumber Centers", American Lumberman, no. 2273, Chicago: Elmer C. Hole, p. 62, December 7, 1918, ISSN 0096-4425, LCCN sn80000563, OCLC 1916285
- "Coast lumberman is dead", The Spokesman-Review, Spokane: Cowles Company, p. 2, February 8, 1925, ISSN 1064-7317, LCCN sn84024754, OCLC 11102610
- "Weyerhaeuser head dies", The Spokesman-Review, Spokane: Cowles Company, p. 4, February 20, 1925, ISSN 1064-7317, LCCN sn84024754, OCLC 11102610
- Hunt, Herbert; Kaylor, Floyd C. (1917), Washington, west of the Cascades; historical and descriptive; the explorers, the Indians, the pioneers, the modern, Chicago: S. J. Clarke Publishing Company, LCCN 18015511, OCLC 10086413
- Prosser, William Farrand (1903), Lewis, Edward Gardner (ed.), A history of the Puget Sound country, its resources, its commerce and its people, New York City: Edward Gardner Lewis, LCCN 05013767
