= Browning, Missouri =

- City
- City of Browning
- Location of Browning, Missouri
- Coordinates: 40°02′05″N 93°09′36″W
- Country: United States
- State: Missouri
- Counties: Linn, Sullivan

Area
  - Total: 0.53 sq mi (1.36 km^{2})
  - Land: 0.52 sq mi (1.35 km^{2})
  - Water: 0 sq mi (0.00 km^{2})
- Elevation: 774 ft (236 m)

Population (2020)
  - Total: 219
  - Density: 418.7/sq mi (161.67/km^{2})
- Time zone: UTC-6 (Central (CST))
  - Summer (DST): UTC-5 (CDT)
- ZIP code: 64630
- Area code: 660
- FIPS code: 29-08884
- GNIS feature ID: 2393438

Browning is a city in Linn and Sullivan counties in the U.S. state of Missouri. The population was 219 at the 2020 census.

== History ==
Browning was laid out and platted in 1872. The community was named in honor of the family of J. A. Browning, a railroad employee. A post office called Browning has been in operation since 1873.

== Geography ==
Browning is located on the Linn-Sullivan county line along Missouri Route 5 between Purdin to the south and Milan to the north. Locust Creek flows past the west side of the community. The Chicago, Burlington and Quincy Railroad passes through the community.

According to the United States Census Bureau, the city has a total area of 0.52 square miles (1.35 km^{2}), all land.

== Demographics ==
Historical population
Census	Pop.	Note	%±
1880	187		—
1890	527		181.8%
1900	726		37.8%
1910	629		−13.4%
1920	694		10.3%
1930	590		−15.0%
1940	531		−10.0%
1950	492		−7.3%
1960	412		−16.3%
1970	412		0.0%
1980	368		−10.7%
1990	331		−10.1%
2000	317		−4.2%
2010	265		−16.4%
2020	219		−17.4%
U.S. Decennial Census

=== 2010 census ===
As of the census of 2010, there were 265 people, 110 households, and 72 families living in the city. The population density was 509.6 inhabitants per square mile (196.8/km^{2}). There were 144 housing units at an average density of 276.9 units per square mile (106.9 units/km^{2}). The racial makeup of the city was 96.2% White, 0.4% African American, 0.4% Native American, 0.4% from other races, and 2.6% from two or more races. Hispanic or Latino of any race were 6.8% of the population.

There were 110 households, of which 31.8% had children under the age of 18 living with them, 40.9% were married couples living together, 14.5% had a female householder with no husband present, 10.0% had a male householder with no wife present, and 34.5% were non-families. 31.8% of all households were made up of individuals, and 10.9% had someone living alone who was 65 years of age or older. The average household size was 2.41 and the average family size was 2.99.

The median age in the city was 38.7 years. 26.4% of residents were under the age of 18; 5.3% were between the ages of 18 and 24; 27.2% were from 25 to 44; 24.9% were from 45 to 64; and 16.2% were 65 years of age or older. The gender makeup of the city was 50.2% male and 49.8% female.

=== 2000 census ===
As of the census of 2000, there were 317 people, 143 households, and 80 families living in the city. The population density was 604.5 inhabitants per square mile (233.4/km^{2}). There were 177 housing units at an average density of 337.5 units per square mile (130.3 units/km^{2}). The racial makeup of the city was 98.42% White, 0.32% Native American, and 1.26% from two or more races. Hispanic or Latino of any race were 0.95% of the population.

There were 143 households, out of which 20.3% had children under the age of 18 living with them, 44.1% were married couples living together, 9.1% had a female householder with no husband present, and 43.4% were non-families. 35.0% of all households were made up of individuals, and 20.3% had someone living alone who was 65 years of age or older. The average household size was 2.22 and the average family size was 2.77.

In the city, the population was spread out, with 18.6% under the age of 18, 9.1% from 18 to 24, 24.9% from 25 to 44, 21.8% from 45 to 64, and 25.6% who were 65 years of age or older. The median age was 43 years. For every 100 females, there were 83.2 males. For every 100 females age 18 and over, there were 84.3 males.

The median income for a household in the city was $19,167, and the median income for a family was $30,625. Males had a median income of $21,250 versus $17,500 for females. The per capita income for the city was $11,266. About 17.0% of families and 26.9% of the population were below the poverty line, including 50.0% of those under age 18 and 13.0% of those age 65 or over.

== Notable person ==
- Gene Bartow - Hall of Fame college basketball coach and NBA executive, born and raised in the Browning area.
