= Meadville, Missouri =

- City
- Location of Meadville, Missouri
- Coordinates: 39°47′17″N 93°17′57″W
- Country: United States
- State: Missouri
- County: Linn

Area
  - Total: 0.54 sq mi (1.40 km^{2})
  - Land: 0.54 sq mi (1.40 km^{2})
  - Water: 0 sq mi (0.00 km^{2})
- Elevation: 761 ft (232 m)

Population (2020)
  - Total: 415
  - Density: 769.1/sq mi (296.95/km^{2})
- Time zone: UTC-6 (Central (CST))
  - Summer (DST): UTC-5 (CDT)
- ZIP code: 64659
- Area code: 660
- FIPS code: 29-47036
- GNIS feature ID: 2395078
- Website: meadvillemo.weebly.com

Meadville is a city in southwest Linn County, Missouri, United States. The population was 415 at the 2020 census.

== History ==
A post office called Meadville has been in operation since 1869. The community was named for Charles Mead, superintendent of the St. Joseph Railroad.

== Geography ==
Meadville is located in southwestern Linn County on Missouri Route 139 one half mile north of US Route 36. Laclede is seven miles to the east and Wheeling is four miles west in adjacent Livingston County. Parson Creek flows past one mile to the west.

According to the United States Census Bureau, the city has a total area of 0.54 square miles (1.40 km^{2}), all land.

== Demographics ==
Historical population
| Census | Pop. | Note | %± |
|---|---|---|---|
| 1880 | 446 | | — |
| 1890 | 672 | | 50.7% |
| 1900 | 760 | | 13.1% |
| 1910 | 580 | | −23.7% |
| 1920 | 616 | | 6.2% |
| 1930 | 540 | | −12.3% |
| 1940 | 509 | | −5.7% |
| 1950 | 446 | | −12.4% |
| 1960 | 447 | | 0.2% |
| 1970 | 409 | | −8.5% |
| 1980 | 416 | | 1.7% |
| 1990 | 360 | | −13.5% |
| 2000 | 457 | | 26.9% |
| 2010 | 462 | | 1.1% |
| 2020 | 415 | | −10.2% |
U.S. Decennial Census

=== 2010 census ===
As of the census of 2010, there were 462 people, 183 households, and 131 families living in the city. The population density was 855.6 inhabitants per square mile (330.3/km^{2}). There were 204 housing units at an average density of 377.8 per square mile (145.9/km^{2}). The racial makeup of the city was 99.1% White, 0.2% African American, 0.4% from other races, and 0.2% from two or more races. Hispanic or Latino of any race were 1.3% of the population.

There were 183 households, of which 35.5% had children under the age of 18 living with them, 61.2% were married couples living together, 7.7% had a female householder with no husband present, 2.7% had a male householder with no wife present, and 28.4% were non-families. 25.1% of all households were made up of individuals, and 17.5% had someone living alone who was 65 years of age or older. The average household size was 2.52 and the average family size was 3.02.

The median age in the city was 36.8 years. 28.4% of residents were under the age of 18; 7% were between the ages of 18 and 24; 23.6% were from 25 to 44; 22% were from 45 to 64; and 18.8% were 65 years of age or older. The gender makeup of the city was 47.0% male and 53.0% female.

=== 2000 census ===
As of the census of 2000, there were 457 people, 185 households, and 120 families living in the city. The population density was 1,118.4 inhabitants per square mile (431.8/km^{2}). There were 209 housing units at an average density of 511.5 per square mile (197.5/km^{2}). The racial makeup of the city was 98.91% White, 0.44% African American, 0.22% from other races, and 0.44% from two or more races. Hispanic or Latino of any race were 0.88% of the population.

There were 185 households, out of which 35.1% had children under the age of 18 living with them, 58.4% were married couples living together, 4.9% had a female householder with no husband present, and 35.1% were non-families. 33.5% of all households were made up of individuals, and 22.2% had someone living alone who was 65 years of age or older. The average household size was 2.47 and the average family size was 3.24.

In the city the population was spread out, with 28.7% under the age of 18, 7.4% from 18 to 24, 26.9% from 25 to 44, 18.2% from 45 to 64, and 18.8% who were 65 years of age or older. The median age was 37 years. For every 100 females, there were 85.0 males. For every 100 females age 18 and over, there were 85.2 males.

The median income for a household in the city was $32,841, and the median income for a family was $38,929. Males had a median income of $24,250 versus $17,386 for females. The per capita income for the city was $14,427. About 1.6% of families and 6.1% of the population were below the poverty line, including 5.5% of those under age 18 and 10.8% of those age 65 or over.

== Notable people ==
- J. D. Barnett, basketball coach.
- Irene Barnes Taeuber, demographer
