= Purdin, Missouri =

- City
- Location of Purdin, Missouri
- Coordinates: 39°57′03″N 93°09′59″W
- Country: United States
- State: Missouri
- County: Linn

Area
  - Total: 0.31 sq mi (0.80 km^{2})
  - Land: 0.31 sq mi (0.79 km^{2})
  - Water: 0 sq mi (0.00 km^{2})
- Elevation: 869 ft (265 m)

Population (2020)
  - Total: 141
  - Density: 460.1/sq mi (177.64/km^{2})
- Time zone: UTC-6 (Central (CST))
  - Summer (DST): UTC-5 (CDT)
- ZIP code: 64674
- Area code: 660
- FIPS code: 29-60158
- GNIS feature ID: 2396293

Purdin is a city in northwest Linn County, Missouri, United States. The population was 141 at the 2020 census.

== History ==
Purdin was platted in 1873. The community was named for its founder, Allen W. Purdin. A post office called Purdin has been in operation since 1877.

== Geography ==
According to the United States Census Bureau, the city has a total area of 0.31 square miles (0.80 km^{2}), all land.

== Demographics ==
Historical population
Census	Pop.	Note	%±
1900	229		—
1910	337		47.2%
1920	355		5.3%
1930	341		−3.9%
1940	303		−11.1%
1950	255		−15.8%
1960	207		−18.8%
1970	236		14.0%
1980	243		3.0%
1990	217		−10.7%
2000	223		2.8%
2010	190		−14.8%
2020	141		−25.8%
U.S. Decennial Census

=== 2010 census ===
As of the census of 2010, there were 190 people, 79 households, and 49 families residing in the city. The population density was 612.9 inhabitants per square mile (236.6/km^{2}). There were 99 housing units at an average density of 319.4 per square mile (123.3/km^{2}). The racial makeup of the city was 99.5% White and 0.5% from two or more races. Hispanic or Latino of any race were 2.6% of the population.

There were 79 households, of which 35.4% had children under the age of 18 living with them, 46.8% were married couples living together, 10.1% had a female householder with no husband present, 5.1% had a male householder with no wife present, and 38.0% were non-families. 34.2% of all households were made up of individuals, and 19% had someone living alone who was 65 years of age or older. The average household size was 2.41 and the average family size was 3.18.

The median age in the city was 36 years. 27.9% of residents were under the age of 18; 8.3% were between the ages of 18 and 24; 23.6% were from 25 to 44; 20.5% were from 45 to 64; and 19.5% were 65 years of age or older. The gender makeup of the city was 48.9% male and 51.1% female.

=== 2000 census ===
As of the census of 2000, there were 223 people, 96 households, and 57 families residing in the city. The population density was 717.1 inhabitants per square mile (276.9/km^{2}). There were 110 housing units at an average density of 353.7 per square mile (136.6/km^{2}). The racial makeup of the city was 99.10% White, 0.45% African American, and 0.45% from two or more races. Hispanic or Latino of any race were 0.90% of the population.

There were 96 households, out of which 33.3% had children under the age of 18 living with them, 50.0% were married couples living together, 7.3% had a female householder with no husband present, and 39.6% were non-families. 37.5% of all households were made up of individuals, and 26.0% had someone living alone who was 65 years of age or older. The average household size was 2.32 and the average family size was 3.09.

In the city the population was spread out, with 28.7% under the age of 18, 5.8% from 18 to 24, 26.5% from 25 to 44, 17.9% from 45 to 64, and 21.1% who were 65 years of age or older. The median age was 36 years. For every 100 females, there were 75.6 males. For every 100 females age 18 and over, there were 72.8 males.

The median income for a household in the city was $19,750, and the median income for a family was $25,625. Males had a median income of $23,438 versus $20,536 for females. The per capita income for the city was $9,636. About 27.9% of families and 28.1% of the population were below the poverty line, including 36.1% of those under the age of eighteen and 9.8% of those 65 or over.

== Notable people ==
- Bonnie Leman, magazine publisher.
