= Yellow Creek (Grand River tributary) =

Stream in Missouri, U.S.

Yellow Creek is a stream in Chariton County in the U.S. state of Missouri. It is a tributary of the Grand River.

The stream is formed by the confluence of East Yellow Creek and West Yellow Creek adjacent to the east side of the city of Rothville at 39°39′06″N 93°03′14″W. The confluence with the Grand River is just west of the community of Mendon and the Swan Lake Wildlife Refuge. at 39°34′11″N 93°16′02″W.

Yellow Creek was named for the deposits of yellow clay along its course.

== See also ==
- List of rivers of Missouri
