= Milan, Missouri =

- City
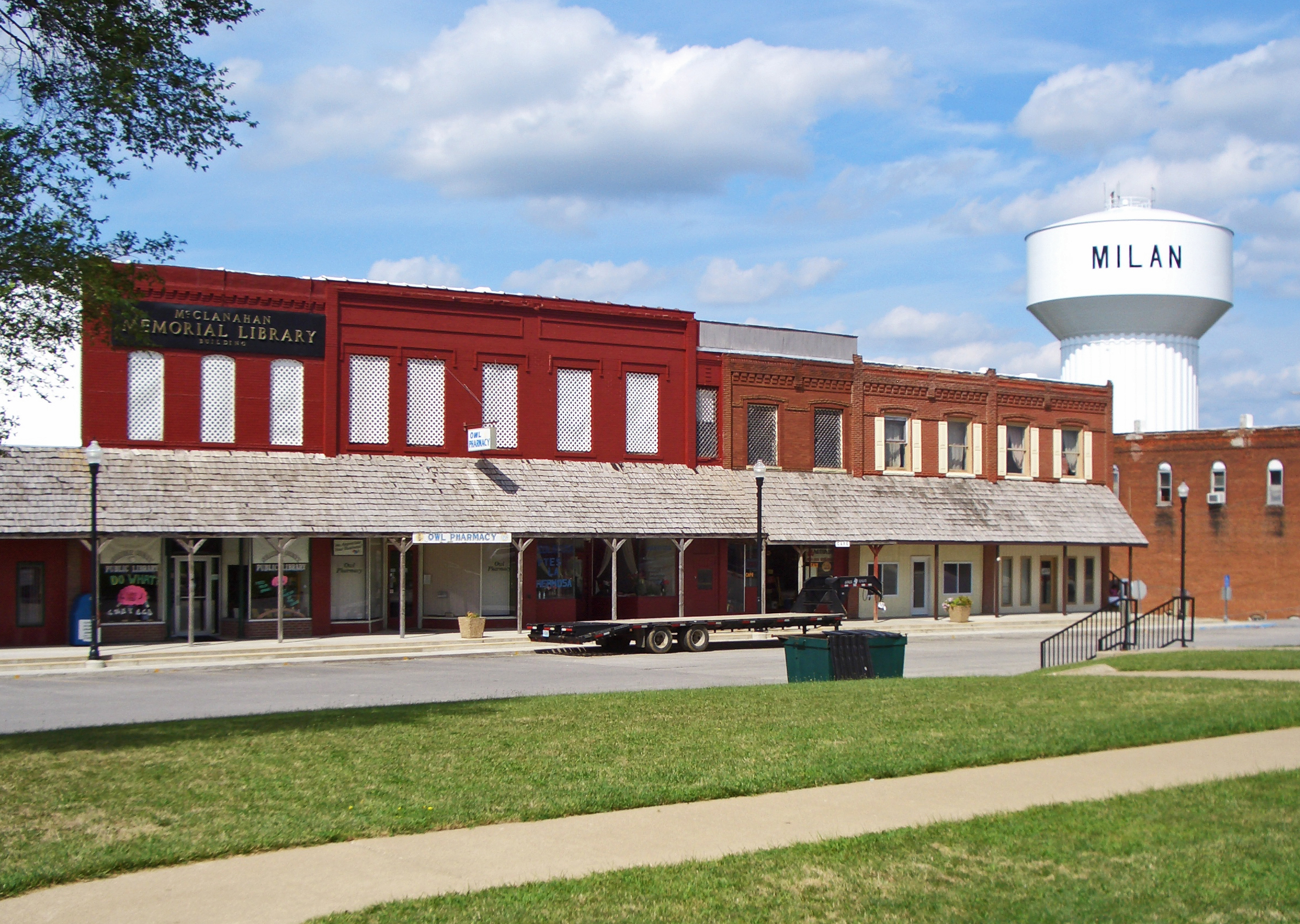
- East 2nd Street on the town square with the water tower beyond

- Location of Milan, Missouri
- Coordinates: 40°12′12″N 93°07′28″W
- Country: United States
- State: Missouri
- County: Sullivan

Area
  - Total: 1.78 sq mi (4.62 km^{2})
  - Land: 1.77 sq mi (4.59 km^{2})
  - Water: 0.0077 sq mi (0.02 km^{2})
- Elevation: 965 ft (294 m)

Population (2020)
  - Total: 1,819
  - Density: 1,025.7/sq mi (396.02/km^{2})
- Time zone: UTC-6 (Central (CST))
  - Summer (DST): UTC-5 (CDT)
- ZIP code: 63556
- Area code: 660
- FIPS code: 29-48062
- GNIS feature ID: 2395320
- Website: milanmo.gov

Milan (/ˈmaɪlən/ MY-lən) is a city in Sullivan County, Missouri, United States. The population was 1,819 at the 2020 census. It is the county seat of Sullivan County.

== Geography ==
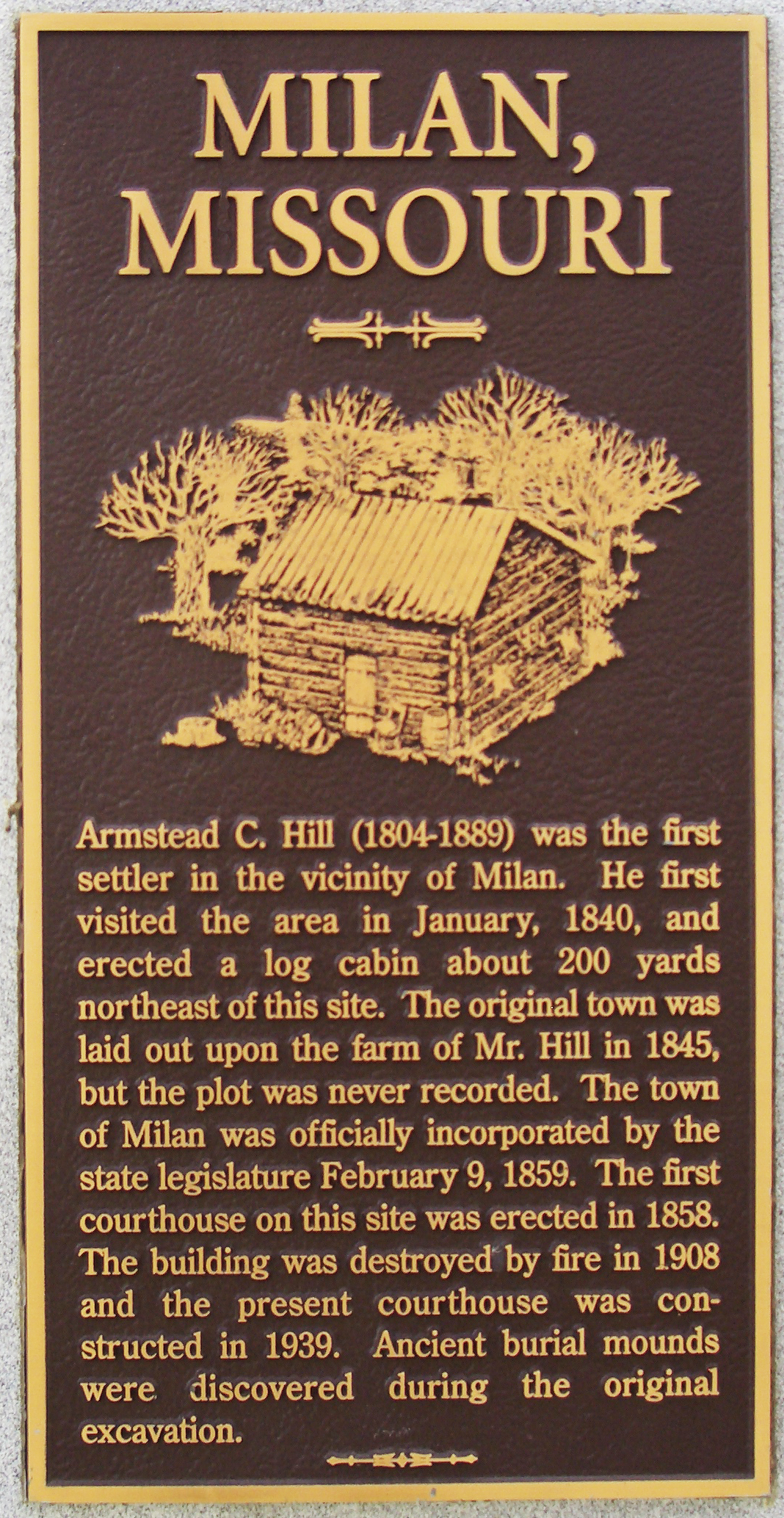
Historical marker

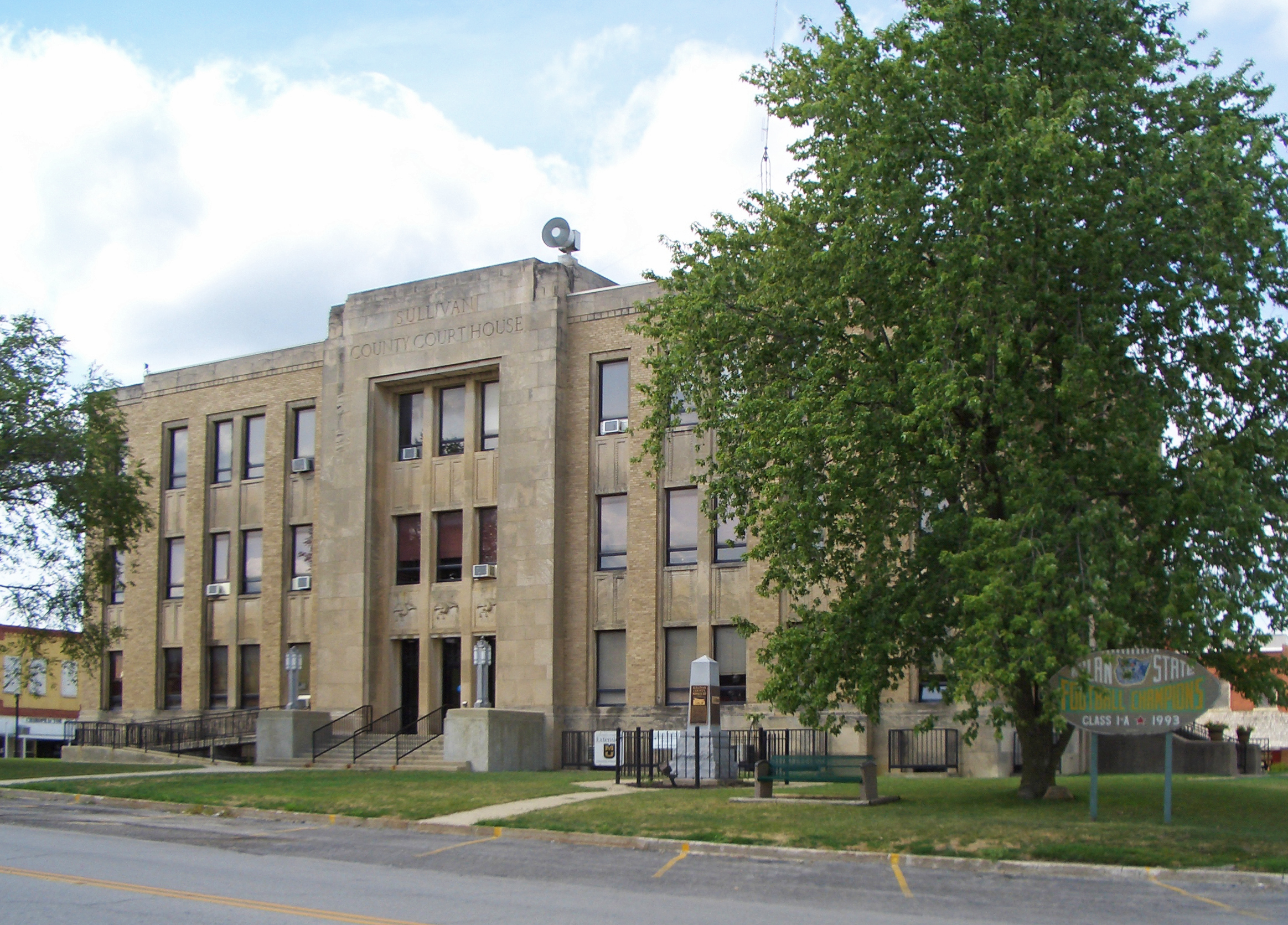
Sullivan County courthouse in Milan, Missouri

Milan is located at the intersection of Missouri routes 5 and 6. Locust Creek flows past the west side of the city and the Locust Creek Conservation Area is three miles to the southwest.

According to the United States Census Bureau, the city has a total area of 1.78 square miles (4.61 km^{2}), of which 1.77 square miles (4.58 km^{2}) is land and 0.01 square miles (0.03 km^{2}) is water.

== History ==
Milan was laid out in 1845, and most likely named after Milan, in Italy. A post office called Milan has been in operation since 1847.

Camp Ground Church and Cemetery, Milan Railroad Depot, and Quincy, Omaha and Kansas City Railroad Office Building are listed on the National Register of Historic Places.

== Demographics ==
Historical population
Census	Pop.	Note	%±
1870	319		—
1880	1,117		250.2%
1890	1,234		10.5%
1900	1,757		42.4%
1910	2,191		24.7%
1920	2,395		9.3%
1930	2,002		−16.4%
1940	2,016		0.7%
1950	1,972		−2.2%
1960	1,670		−15.3%
1970	1,794		7.4%
1980	1,947		8.5%
1990	1,767		−9.2%
2000	1,958		10.8%
2010	1,960		0.1%
2020	1,819		−7.2%
U.S. Decennial Census

=== 2020 census ===
As of the 2020 census, Milan had a population of 1,819. The median age was 34.3 years. 29.9% of residents were under the age of 18 and 12.4% of residents were 65 years of age or older. For every 100 females there were 107.4 males, and for every 100 females age 18 and over there were 106.5 males age 18 and over.

0.0% of residents lived in urban areas, while 100.0% lived in rural areas.

There were 700 households in Milan, of which 37.6% had children under the age of 18 living in them. Of all households, 37.9% were married-couple households, 26.0% were households with a male householder and no spouse or partner present, and 29.4% were households with a female householder and no spouse or partner present. About 34.9% of all households were made up of individuals and 14.2% had someone living alone who was 65 years of age or older.

There were 841 housing units, of which 16.8% were vacant. The homeowner vacancy rate was 0.0% and the rental vacancy rate was 16.3%.

Racial composition as of the 2020 census
Race	Number	Percent
White	909	50.0%
Black or African American	175	9.6%
American Indian and Alaska Native	29	1.6%
Asian	18	1.0%
Native Hawaiian and Other Pacific Islander	0	0.0%
Some other race	419	23.0%
Two or more races	269	14.8%
Hispanic or Latino (of any race)	765	42.1%

=== 2010 census ===
As of the census of 2010, there were 1,960 people, 746 households, and 462 families living in the city. The population density was 1,107.3 inhabitants per square mile (427.5/km^{2}). There were 845 housing units at an average density of 477.4 units per square mile (184.3 units/km^{2}). The racial makeup of the city was 74.7% White, 0.6% African American, 0.4% Native American, 0.3% Asian, 0.4% Pacific Islander, 22.4% from other races, and 1.2% from two or more races. Hispanic or Latino of any race were 45.3% of the population.

There were 746 households, of which 36.6% had children under the age of 18 living with them, 41.6% were married couples living together, 12.3% had a female householder with no husband present, 8.0% had a male householder with no wife present, and 38.1% were non-families. 31.5% of all households were made up of individuals, and 15.6% had someone living alone who was 65 years of age or older. The average household size was 2.56 and the average family size was 3.24.

The median age in the city was 32.9 years. 28.1% of residents were under the age of 18; 9.6% were between the ages of 18 and 24; 28.4% were from 25 to 44; 21.7% were from 45 to 64; and 12.4% were 65 years of age or older. The gender makeup of the city was 50.0% male and 50.0% female.

=== 2000 census ===
As of the census of 2000, there were 1,958 people, 782 households, and 477 families living in the city. The population density was 1,068.4 inhabitants per square mile (412.5/km^{2}). There were 857 housing units at an average density of 467.6 units per square mile (180.5 units/km^{2}). The racial makeup of the city was 89.12% White, 0.10% African American, 0.36% Native American, 0.15% Asian, 0.10% Pacific Islander, 8.63% from other races, and 1.53% from two or more races. Hispanic or Latino of any race were 21.86% of the population.

There were 782 households, out of which 29.7% had children under the age of 18 living with them, 44.0% were married couples living together, 12.5% had a female householder with no husband present, and 38.9% were non-families. 33.8% of all households were made up of individuals, and 19.7% had someone living alone who was 65 years of age or older. The average household size was 2.44 and the average family size was 3.08.

In the city, the population was spread out, with 25.9% under the age of 18, 8.9% from 18 to 24, 26.8% from 25 to 44, 20.2% from 45 to 64, and 18.2% who were 65 years of age or older. The median age was 36 years. For every 100 females, there were 95.2 males. For every 100 females age 18 and over, there were 90.9 males.

The median income for a household in the city was $20,691, and the median income for a family was $26,429. Males had a median income of $22,885 versus $15,491 for females. The per capita income for the city was $10,688. About 16.7% of families and 22.9% of the population were below the poverty line, including 27.5% of those under age 18 and 30.0% of those age 65 or over.

== Education ==
Public education in Milan is administered by the Milan C-2 School District.

Milan has a lending library, the Sullivan County Public Library.

== Notable people ==
- William H. Boner – Washington state businessman and politician
- Cal Hubbard – Pro Football Hall of Famer, former MLB umpire and the only person inducted in both the football and baseball Halls of Fame.
- Jarred Sayre – Agricultural educator and longtime FFA advisor for the Milan FFA chapter. He has led the chapter to multiple recognitions at the national and state levels, including consecutive national championships in the FFA Knowledge/Quiz competition in 2023 and 2024.
