= Laclede, Missouri =

- City
- Location of Laclede, Missouri
- Coordinates: 39°47′16″N 93°10′11″W
- Country: United States
- State: Missouri
- County: Linn

Area
  - Total: 1.27 sq mi (3.28 km^{2})
  - Land: 1.25 sq mi (3.24 km^{2})
  - Water: 0.015 sq mi (0.04 km^{2})
- Elevation: 797 ft (243 m)

Population (2020)
  - Total: 305
  - Density: 244.2/sq mi (94.28/km^{2})
- Time zone: UTC-6 (Central (CST))
  - Summer (DST): UTC-5 (CDT)
- ZIP code: 64651
- Area code: 660
- FIPS code: 29-39566
- GNIS feature ID: 2395577

Laclede (/ləˈkliːd/ lə-KLEED) is a city in Linn County, Missouri. The population was 305 at the 2020 census, down from 345 in 2010.

== History ==
Laclede was platted in 1853. The city was named for Pierre Laclède, the founder of St. Louis.

A post office called Laclede has been in operation since 1856. In July 2011 the United States Postal Service announced plans to permanently close the Laclede post office as part of a nationwide restructuring plan.

The Locust Creek Covered Bridge, Gen. John J. Pershing Boyhood Home, and Plum Grove School are listed on the National Register of Historic Places.

== Geography ==
According to the United States Census Bureau, the city has a total area of 1.27 square miles (3.29 km^{2}), of which 1.25 square miles (3.24 km^{2}) is land and 0.02 square miles (0.05 km^{2}) is water.

== Demographics ==
Historical population
Census	Pop.	Note	%±
1880	694		—
1890	688		−0.9%
1900	770		11.9%
1910	740		−3.9%
1920	649		−12.3%
1930	644		−0.8%
1940	642		−0.3%
1950	544		−15.3%
1960	428		−21.3%
1970	430		0.5%
1980	445		3.5%
1990	410		−7.9%
2000	415		1.2%
2010	345		−16.9%
2020	305		−11.6%
U.S. Decennial Census

=== 2010 census ===
As of the census of 2010, there were 345 people, 163 households, and 95 families living in the city. The population density was 276.0 inhabitants per square mile (106.6/km^{2}). There were 197 housing units at an average density of 157.6 per square mile (60.8/km^{2}). The racial makeup of the city was 98.3% White, 0.6% African American, 0.9% Native American, and 0.3% from two or more races. Hispanic or Latino of any race were 0.3% of the population.

There were 163 households, of which 20.9% had children under the age of 18 living with them, 44.8% were married couples living together, 8.6% had a female householder with no husband present, 4.9% had a male householder with no wife present, and 41.7% were non-families. 38.0% of all households were made up of individuals, and 16% had someone living alone who was 65 years of age or older. The average household size was 2.12 and the average family size was 2.73.

The median age in the city was 46.3 years. 19.7% of residents were under the age of 18; 5.9% were between the ages of 18 and 24; 21.9% were from 25 to 44; 30.2% were from 45 to 64; and 22.3% were 65 years of age or older. The gender makeup of the city was 48.7% male and 51.3% female.

=== 2000 census ===
As of the census of 2000, there were 415 people, 182 households, and 117 families living in the city. The population density was 333.3 inhabitants per square mile (128.7/km^{2}). There were 200 housing units at an average density of 160.6 per square mile (62.0/km^{2}). The racial makeup of the city was 97.6% White, 1.5% African American, 0.2% Native American, 0.2% Asian, and 0.5% from two or more races. Hispanic or Latino of any race were 1.69% of the population.

There were 182 households, out of which 27.5% had children under the age of 18 living with them, 50.0% were married couples living together, 10.4% had a female householder with no husband present, and 35.2% were non-families. 33.0% of all households were made up of individuals, and 20.3% had someone living alone who was 65 years of age or older. The average household size was 2.28 and the average family size was 2.86.

In the city the population was spread out, with 24.8% under the age of 18, 6.7% from 18 to 24, 24.6% from 25 to 44, 24.1% from 45 to 64, and 19.8% who were 65 years of age or older. The median age was 40 years. For every 100 females, there were 93.9 males. For every 100 females age 18 and over, there were 84.6 males.

The median income for a household in the city was $24,688, and the median income for a family was $29,519. Males had a median income of $22,422 versus $18,542 for females. The per capita income for the city is $11,890. About 12.8% of families and 19.8% of the population were below the poverty line, including 16.2% of those under age 18 and 25.6% of those age 65 or over.

== Notable persons ==
- John Joseph Pershing, General of the Armies; commander of the AEF in World War I, was born near Laclede in 1860.
