= Linn County, Missouri =

County in Missouri, United States

- County
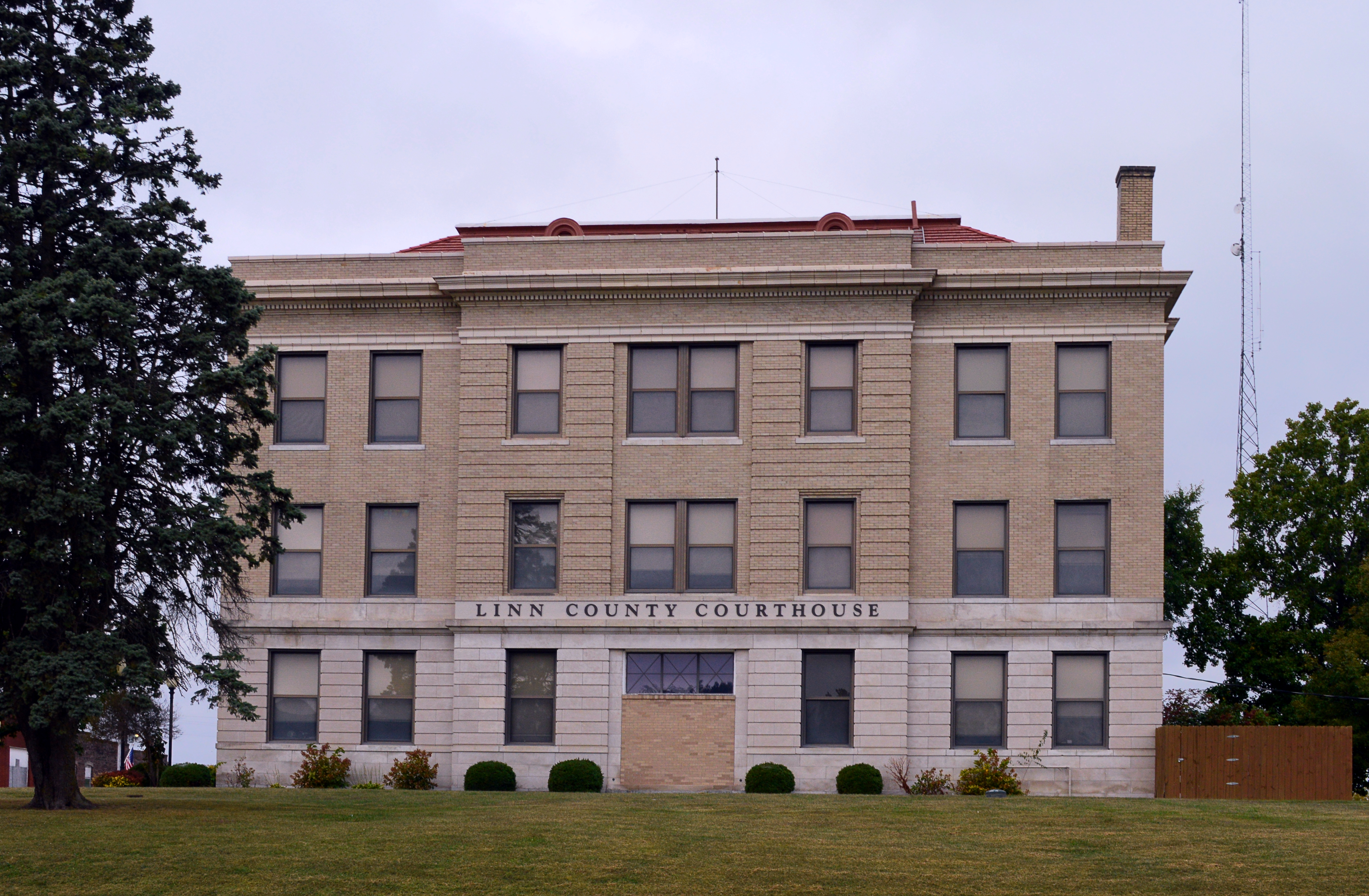
- The Linn County Courthouse in Linneus

- Location within the U.S. state of Missouri
- Coordinates: 39°52′N 93°07′W
- Country: United States
- State: Missouri
- Founded: January 1, 1837
- Named for: Lewis F. Linn
- Seat: Linneus
- Largest city: Brookfield

Area
  - Total: 621 sq mi (1,610 km^{2})
  - Land: 616 sq mi (1,600 km^{2})
  - Water: 5.8 sq mi (15 km^{2}) 0.9%

Population (2020)
  - Total: 11,874
  - Estimate (2025): 11,815 ▼
  - Density: 19.3/sq mi (7.44/km^{2})
- Time zone: UTC−6 (Central)
  - Summer (DST): UTC−5 (CDT)
- Congressional district: 6th

Linn County is a county located in the northern portion of the U.S. state of Missouri. As of the 2020 census, the population was 11,874. Its county seat is Linneus. The county was organized January 1, 1837, and named after U.S. Senator Lewis F. Linn of Missouri.

== Geography ==
According to the U.S. Census Bureau, the county has a total area of 621 square miles (1,610 km^{2}), of which 616 square miles (1,600 km^{2}) is land and 5.8 square miles (15 km^{2}) (0.9%) is water.

=== Adjacent counties ===
- Sullivan County (north)
- Adair County (northeast)
- Macon County (east)
- Chariton County (south)
- Livingston County (west)
- Grundy County (northwest)

=== Major highways ===
- Future I-72 / US 36 / Route 110 (CKC)
  - US 36 Bus. (Brookfield)
- Route 5
- Route 11
- Route 129
- Route 130
- Route 139

== Demographics ==
Historical population
Census	Pop.	Note	%±
1840	2,245		—
1850	4,058		80.8%
1860	9,112		124.5%
1870	15,900		74.5%
1880	20,016		25.9%
1890	24,141		20.6%
1900	25,503		5.6%
1910	25,253		−1.0%
1920	24,778		−1.9%
1930	23,339		−5.8%
1940	21,416		−8.2%
1950	18,865		−11.9%
1960	16,815		−10.9%
1970	15,125		−10.1%
1980	15,495		2.4%
1990	13,885		−10.4%
2000	13,754		−0.9%
2010	12,761		−7.2%
2020	11,874		−7.0%
2025 (est.)	11,815	▼	−0.5%
U.S. Decennial Census; 1790-1960 1900-1990; 1990-2000 2010-2015

=== 2020 census ===
As of the 2020 census, the county had a population of 11,874. The median age was 43.1 years, 23.3% of residents were under the age of 18, and 22.2% of residents were 65 years of age or older. For every 100 females there were 95.6 males, and for every 100 females age 18 and over there were 93.6 males age 18 and over.

The racial makeup of the county was 93.8% White, 0.6% Black or African American, 0.3% American Indian and Alaska Native, 0.2% Asian, 0.1% Native Hawaiian and Pacific Islander, 0.8% from some other race, and 4.3% from two or more races. Hispanic or Latino residents of any race comprised 2.4% of the population.

32.6% of residents lived in urban areas, while 67.4% lived in rural areas.

There were 5,065 households in the county, of which 27.7% had children under the age of 18 living with them and 26.1% had a female householder with no spouse or partner present. About 31.7% of all households were made up of individuals and 16.1% had someone living alone who was 65 years of age or older.

There were 5,999 housing units, of which 15.6% were vacant. Among occupied housing units, 73.4% were owner-occupied and 26.6% were renter-occupied. The homeowner vacancy rate was 2.3% and the rental vacancy rate was 9.4%.

=== Racial and ethnic composition ===
Linn County, Missouri – Racial and ethnic composition Note: the US Census treats Hispanic/Latino as an ethnic category. This table excludes Latinos from the racial categories and assigns them to a separate category. Hispanics/Latinos may be of any race.
Race / Ethnicity (NH = Non-Hispanic)	Pop 1980	Pop 1990	Pop 2000	Pop 2010	Pop 2020	% 1980	% 1990	% 2000	% 2010	% 2020
White alone (NH)	15,181	13,645	13,406	12,297	11,027	97.97%	98.27%	97.47%	96.36%	92.87%
Black or African American alone (NH)	155	107	82	85	67	1.00%	0.77%	0.60%	0.67%	0.56%
Native American or Alaska Native alone (NH)	19	22	47	26	31	0.12%	0.16%	0.34%	0.20%	0.26%
Asian alone (NH)	20	13	19	26	22	0.13%	0.09%	0.14%	0.20%	0.19%
Native Hawaiian or Pacific Islander alone (NH)	x	x	0	1	6	x	x	0.00%	0.01%	0.05%
Other race alone (NH)	5	4	1	3	25	0.03%	0.03%	0.01%	0.02%	0.21%
Mixed race or Multiracial (NH)	x	x	95	130	407	x	x	0.69%	1.02%	3.43%
Hispanic or Latino (any race)	115	94	104	193	289	0.74%	0.68%	0.76%	1.51%	2.43%
Total	15,495	13,885	13,754	12,761	11,874	100.00%	100.00%	100.00%	100.00%	100.00%

=== 2000 census ===
As of the census of 2000, there were 13,754 people, 5,697 households and 3,760 families residing in the county. The population density was 22 people per square mile (8.5 people/km^{2}). There were 6,554 housing units at an average density of 11 units per square mile (4.2/km^{2}). The racial makeup of the county was 97.98% White, 0.60% Black or African American, 0.38% Native American, 0.14% Asian, 0.15% from other races and 0.76% from two or more races. Approximately 0.76% of the population were Hispanic or Latino of any race.

There were 5,697 households, out of which 29.60% had children under the age of 18 living with them, 53.60% were married couples living together, 8.90% had a female householder with no husband present and 34.00% were non-families. 30.30% of all households were made up of individuals, and 16.80% had someone living alone who was 65 years of age or older. The average household size was 2.37 and the average family size was 2.94.

In the county, the population was spread out, with 25.40% under the age of 18, 7.00% from 18 to 24, 24.40% from 25 to 44, 22.60% from 45 to 64 and 20.60% who were 65 years of age or older. The median age was 40 years. For every 100 females there were 89.60 males. For every 100 females age 18 and over, there were 85.70 males.

The median income for a household in the county was $28,242, and the median income for a family was $36,134. Males had a median income of $25,635 versus $18,820 for females. The per capita income for the county was $15,378. About 11.30% of families and 14.90% of the population were below the poverty line, including 20.20% of those under age 18 and 14.10% of those age 65 or over.

== Education ==
=== Public schools ===
School districts include:

- Brookfield R-III School District – Brookfield
  - Brookfield Elementary School (PK-04)
  - Brookfield Middle School (05-08)
  - Brookfield High School (09-12)
- Bucklin R-II School District – Bucklin
  - Bucklin Elementary School (PK-06)
  - Bucklin High School (07-12)
- Linn County R-1 School District – Purdin
  - Linn County Elementary School (PK-05)
  - Linn County High School (06-12)
- Marceline R-V School District – Marceline
  - Walt Disney Elementary School (K-05)
  - Marceline Middle School (06-08)
  - Marceline High School (09-12)
- Meadville R-IV School District – Meadville
  - Meadville Elementary School (K-06)
  - Meadville High School (07-12)

=== Private schools ===
- Father McCartan Memorial School – Marceline (PK-08) – Roman Catholic
- Locust Creek Mennonite School – Laclede (02-09) – Mennonite

=== Public libraries ===
- Brookfield Public Library
- Marceline Carnegie Library

== Communities ==
=== Cities and towns ===
- Brookfield
- Browning (partly in Sullivan County)
- Bucklin
- Laclede
- Linneus (county seat)
- Marceline
- Meadville
- Purdin

=== Census-designated place ===
- St. Catherine

=== Unincorporated communities ===
- Bear Branch
- Enterprise
- Eversonville
- Forker
- Fountain Grove
- Garner
- Grantsville
- Haseville
- Hecla
- Leverton
- Lowell
- New Boston
- North Salem
- Sedgwick
- Shafter
- Shelby

=== Townships ===
- Baker
- Benton
- Brookfield
- Bucklin
- Clay
- Enterprise
- Grantsville
- Jackson
- Jefferson
- Locust Creek
- Marceline
- North Salem
- Parson Creek
- Yellow Creek

== Notable people ==
- Doris Akers, gospel singer and composer, was born in Brookfield and resided there until age five.
- Gene Bartow, Hall of Fame college basketball coach and NBA executive.
- Walt Disney, lived on a farm near Marceline as a young boy.
- John J. Pershing, four-star General of the Armies, was born in Laclede.

== Politics ==
=== Local ===
Linn County, Missouri

Elected countywide officials
Assessor	Christy Techau-Dover	Republican
Circuit Clerk	Amber Boley	Democratic
County Clerk	Suzan Stephenson	Republican
Collector	Tiffany Hoerrmann	Republican
Commissioner (presiding)	Nelson Dinsmore	Republican
Commissioner (district 1)	Glen Murrain	Republican
Commissioner (district 2)	Josh Muck	Republican
Coroner	Kjersten Parn	Republican
Prosecuting Attorney	Tracy L. Carlson	Republican
Public Administrator	Lana Kilmer	Republican
Recorder	Jennifer Shoop-Baker	Republican
Sheriff	Carrie Melte	Republican
Surveyor	Thomas Kelly	Republican

=== State ===
Past Gubernatorial Elections Results
Year	Republican	Democratic	Third Parties
2024	76.26% 4,285	21.50% 1,208	2.24% 126
2020	75.12% 4,275	22.98% 1,308	1.90% 108
2016	61.38% 3,414	35.71% 1,986	2.91% 162
2012	44.43% 2,456	52.24% 2,888	3.33% 184
2008	40.10% 2,371	57.56% 3,403	2.33% 138
2004	55.11% 3,252	43.86% 2,588	1.04% 61
2000	48.02% 2,869	50.26% 3,003	1.72% 103
1996	30.31% 1,783	67.44% 3,967	2.24% 132

Linn County is split between two districts in Missouri's House of Representatives, both of which are represented by Republicans.

- District 6 — Tim Remole (R-Excello). Consists of a thin slice of the eastern part of the county.

Missouri House of Representatives — District 6 — Linn County (2016)
Party	Candidate	Votes	%	±%
Republican	Tim Remole	1,199	100.00%	+47.81

Missouri House of Representatives — District 6 — Linn County (2014)
Party	Candidate	Votes	%	±%
Republican	Tim Remole	441	52.19%	+0.65
Democratic	Robert Harrington	404	47.81%	−0.65

Missouri House of Representatives — District 6 — Linn County (2012)
Party	Candidate	Votes	%	±%
Republican	Tim Remole	635	51.54%	
Democratic	Diane J. Scott	597	48.46%	

- District 7 — Rusty Black (R-Chillicothe). Consists of the central and western parts of the county.

Missouri House of Representatives — District 7 — Linn County (2016)
Party	Candidate	Votes	%	±%
Republican	Rusty Black	3,648	100.00%	

Missouri House of Representatives — District 7 — Linn County (2014)
Party	Candidate	Votes	%	±%
Republican	Mike Lair	2,032	100.00%	+47.19

Missouri House of Representatives — District 7 — Linn County (2012)
Party	Candidate	Votes	%	±%
Republican	Mike Lair	2,178	52.81%	
Democratic	Harry Wyse	1,946	47.19%	

All of Linn County is a part of Missouri's 18th District in the Missouri Senate and is currently represented by Brian Munzingler (R-Williamstown).

Missouri Senate - District 18 – Linn County (2014)
Party	Candidate	Votes	%	±%
Republican	Brian Munzingler	2,648	100.00%	

=== Federal ===
U.S. Senate — Missouri — Linn County (2016)
Party	Candidate	Votes	%	±%
Republican	Roy Blunt	3,245	58.31%	+18.94
Democratic	Jason Kander	2,058	36.98%	−15.83
Libertarian	Jonathan Dine	136	2.44%	−5.38
Green	Johnathan McFarland	70	1.26%	+1.26
Constitution	Fred Ryman	56	1.01%	+1.01

U.S. Senate — Missouri — Linn County (2012)
Party	Candidate	Votes	%	±%
Republican	Todd Akin	2,190	39.37%	
Democratic	Claire McCaskill	2,911	52.81%	
Libertarian	Jonathan Dine	431	7.82%	

All of Linn County is included in Missouri's 6th Congressional District and is currently represented by Sam Graves (R-Tarkio) in the U.S. House of Representatives.

U.S. House of Representatives — Missouri's 6th Congressional District — Linn County (2016)
Party	Candidate	Votes	%	±%
Republican	Sam Graves	4,102	74.70%	+1.78
Democratic	David M. Blackwell	1,235	22.49%	−0.79
Libertarian	Russ Lee Monchil	82	1.49%	−0.18
Green	Mike Diel	72	1.31%	+1.31

U.S. House of Representatives — Missouri's 6th Congressional District — Linn County (2014)
Party	Candidate	Votes	%	±%
Republican	Sam Graves	2,496	72.92%	+5.30
Democratic	Bill Hedge	797	23.28%	−6.97
Libertarian	Russ Lee Monchil	130	3.80%	+1.67

U.S. House of Representatives — Missouri’s 6th Congressional District — Linn County (2012)
Party	Candidate	Votes	%	±%
Republican	Sam Graves	3,686	67.62%	
Democratic	Kyle Yarber	1,649	30.25%	
Libertarian	Russ Lee Monchil	116	2.13%	

=== Political culture ===
United States presidential election results for Linn County, Missouri
Year	Republican		Democratic		Third party(ies)	
Year	No.	%	No.	%	No.	%
1888	2,505	46.21%	2,588	47.74%	328	6.05%
1892	2,501	44.97%	2,523	45.37%	537	9.66%
1896	3,015	47.18%	3,327	52.07%	48	0.75%
1900	3,104	48.95%	3,137	49.47%	100	1.58%
1904	3,182	52.58%	2,748	45.41%	122	2.02%
1908	2,974	48.66%	3,000	49.08%	138	2.26%
1912	1,452	24.18%	2,890	48.13%	1,662	27.68%
1916	2,801	43.97%	3,441	54.02%	128	2.01%
1920	5,557	51.08%	5,184	47.66%	137	1.26%
1924	5,155	45.84%	5,386	47.89%	705	6.27%
1928	6,996	61.31%	4,395	38.52%	20	0.18%
1932	3,611	36.63%	6,177	62.66%	70	0.71%
1936	5,118	42.95%	6,744	56.60%	53	0.44%
1940	5,664	47.46%	6,246	52.34%	24	0.20%
1944	4,942	48.48%	5,242	51.43%	9	0.09%
1948	4,034	41.03%	5,788	58.86%	11	0.11%
1952	5,551	51.63%	5,189	48.27%	11	0.10%
1956	5,028	49.87%	5,055	50.13%	0	0.00%
1960	5,086	52.87%	4,534	47.13%	0	0.00%
1964	2,883	33.45%	5,735	66.55%	0	0.00%
1968	3,795	46.05%	3,933	47.72%	513	6.22%
1972	4,595	59.92%	3,073	40.08%	0	0.00%
1976	3,114	43.03%	4,092	56.55%	30	0.41%
1980	3,585	49.63%	3,467	47.99%	172	2.38%
1984	3,822	55.12%	3,112	44.88%	0	0.00%
1988	3,061	49.15%	3,150	50.58%	17	0.27%
1992	1,967	30.56%	2,916	45.31%	1,553	24.13%
1996	2,097	35.60%	2,967	50.36%	827	14.04%
2000	3,246	54.01%	2,646	44.03%	118	1.96%
2004	3,422	58.02%	2,440	41.37%	36	0.61%
2008	3,140	52.94%	2,638	44.48%	153	2.58%
2012	3,344	60.25%	2,041	36.77%	165	2.97%
2016	4,088	73.17%	1,240	22.19%	259	4.64%
2020	4,363	76.20%	1,275	22.27%	88	1.54%
2024	4,437	78.02%	1,183	20.80%	67	1.18%

== See also ==
- National Register of Historic Places listings in Linn County, Missouri
- USS Linn County (LST-900)
