= Schneider (surname) =

Schneider (German for "tailor", literally "one who cuts", from the verb schneiden "to cut") is a very common surname in Germany. Alternative spellings include: Schneyder, Schnieder, Snyder, Snider, Sneider, Schnyder, Znaider, Schnaider, Schneiter, Shneider, and Sneijder, Snijder (Dutch), Snither (English), Snyman (Afrikaans), Schnider (Swiss German), Sznajder, Szneider (Polish), Snaider, Šnajder (Serbo-Croatian), and Schneidre (French).

== Geographical distribution ==
As of 2014, 57.9% of all known bearers of the surname Schneider were residents of Germany (frequency 1:184), 18.8% of the United States (1:2,554), 6.1% of Brazil (1:4,446), 3.6% of Switzerland (1:299), 3.6% of France (1:2,452), 2.6% of Austria (1:443), 1.3% of Canada (1:3,837) and 1.0% of Argentina (1:5,820).

In Germany, the frequency of the surname was higher than national average (1:184) in the following states:

1. Rhineland-Palatinate (1:96)
2. Saarland (1:102)
3. Hesse (1:123)
4. Saxony (1:150)
5. Baden-Württemberg (1:151)
6. Thuringia (1:166)
7. Bavaria (1:173)
8. Brandenburg (1:178)

== People ==
=== A–G ===
- Adolphe Schneider (born 1802), French industrialist, founder of Schneider-Creusot that become Schneider Electric
- Aileen Schneider (born 1993), German stage director
- Alexander Schneider (1908–1993), Lithuanian-born American classical musician
- Amy Schneider, U.S. quiz game show contestant on Jeopardy!
- Andrew Schneider (journalist), (1942–2017), American investigative journalist
- Andy Schneider (born 1981), American ice hockey player
- Anthony Schneider, (1933–1997), Canadian ice hockey player and coach
- Anthony Robin Schneider, bass from New Zealand
- Athanasius Schneider, Auxiliary Bishop of Mary Most Holy in Astana
- Attila Schneider(1955–2003), Hungarian chess master
- Barbara Schneider, American playwright
- Bastian Schneider (born 1990), German politician
- Ben Ross Schneider, American professor
- Bernd Schneider (chess player), German chess master
- Bernd Schneider (footballer), German footballer
- Bernd Schneider (racing driver), German racing driver
- Bert Schneider, American film producer
- Bert Schneider (boxer) (1897–1986), Canadian olympic boxer of the 1920s
- Braden Schneider (born 2001), Canadian ice hockey player
- Brian Schneider (born 1976), American baseball player
- Camillo Karl Schneider (1876–1951), German botanist
- Carl Schneider, psychiatrist
- Carlos Eduardo Schneider (born 1988), Brazilian footballer, better known as Duda
- Carsten Schneider (born 1976), German politician
- Catherine Schneider (1856–1918), Baltic German saint
- Charles Schneider (disambiguation), several people
- Christian Schneider (1887–1972), German industrialist
- Christine Schneider (born 1972), German politician
- Christoph Schneider (born 1966), drummer in the German band Rammstein
- Christoph Schneider (geographer) (born 1965), German geographer and Rector of the University of Hohenheim
- Cory Schneider (born 1986), American ice hockey player
- Dan Schneider (born 1966), American actor, writer, producer
- Dan Schneider (baseball) (born 1942), American baseball player
- Dan Schneider (writer) (born 1965), American poet, writer, literary critic
- David Schneider (disambiguation), several people
- Davis Schneider, American baseball player
- Dean Schneider, Swiss animal sanctuary founder and social media personality
- Dick Schneider (1948–2025), Dutch football player
- Eddie August Schneider (1910–1940), American aviator
- Édouard Schneider (1880–1960), French author
- Edward Schneider (disambiguation), several people
- Erich Schneider (1894–1980), German Iron Cross recipient in World Wars I and II
- Eugène Schneider (1805–1875), French industrialist and politician
- Ferdinand Schneider (1911–1984), German chemist
- Florian Schneider-Esleben (1947–2020), German musician, former member of Kraftwerk
- Frank Schneider (born 1942), a German musicologist
- Frank Schneider (born 1970 or 1971), former spy within the Luxembourgish State Intelligence service
- Frankie Schneider (1926 – 2018), American stock car, modified, midget, and sprint car racer
- Franz Schneider (chemist) (1812–1897), Austrian physician and chemist
- Franz Schneider (engineer), Swiss engineer and aircraft designer
- Fred Schneider, American vocalist
- Fred B. Schneider (born 1953), American computer scientist
- Gary Schneider (born 1954), South African-born American photographer
- Georg Schneider (disambiguation), several people
- George Schneider (disambiguation), several people
- Georges Schneider (1925–1963), Swiss alpine skier

=== H–P ===
- Hannah Schneider, (born 1982), Danish musician
- Hannes Schneider (1890–1955), Austrian skiing pioneer
- Helen Schneider, American vocalist and actress
- Helge Schneider, (born 1955), German comedian and jazz musician
- Henrik Schneider, Hungarian rower
- Henry Schneider (1817–87) British industrialist and politician
- Hortense Schneider (1833–1920), French operetta soprano
- Inge Schneider-Gabriel, German rower
- Ivo Schneider (born 1938), German mathematician and historian of mathematics and natural sciences
- Jens-Holger Schneider (born 1971), politician
- Jerry Neil Schneider (born c. 1951), entrepreneur and social engineer
- Johann Gottlob Theaenus Schneider (1750–1822), German classical scholar and naturalist
- Johann Rudolf Schneider (1804–1880), Swiss Dr. in medicine & politician, initiator of the Jura water correction
- John Schneider (disambiguation), several people
- John Brand Schneider, American engineer
- Jörg Schneider (actor) (1935–2015), Swiss actor
- Jörg Schneider (born 1964), German politician
- Josef Schneider (disambiguation), several people
- Juan Esnáider (born 1973), Argentine football player
- Julia Schneider (born 1990), German politician
- Julius Schneider (politician) (born 1992), German politician
- Junnosuke Schneider (born 1977), Japanese football player
- J. Glenn Schneider (1935–2017), American educator and politician
- Karl Schneider (activist) (1869–1945), German ophthalmologist, pacifist and anti-Nazi fighter
- Karl Schneider (cricketer) (1905–1928), Australian cricketer
- Karla Schneider (born 1938), German writer
- Kathrin Schneider (born 1962), German politician
- Kirk J. Schneider, American psychologist and psychotherapist
- Kjell Schneider (born 1976), German beach volleyball player
- Kurt Schneider (disambiguation), several people
- Lars-Åke Schneider (born 1955), Swedish chess master
- Ludwig Karl Eduard Schneider (1809–1899), German botanist and politician
- Luis Alberto Schneider (born 1959), Chilean sprinter
- Luis Mario Schneider (1931–1999), Argentine-born Mexican poet and writer
- Mac Schneider, American politician
- Magda Schneider (1909–1996), German actress, mother of Romy Schneider
- Maria Schneider (actress) (1952–2011), French actress
- Maria Schneider (cartoonist), American writer and cartoonist for The Onion
- Maria Schneider (musician) (born 1960), American conductor and composer
- Marilyn Schneider (born 1952), American physicist
- Mathias Schneider (1834–1917), Hungarian-German judge
- Mathieu Schneider (born 1969), American professional hockey player
- Matthew J. Schneider, United States District Attorney
- Max Schneider American Actor, Musician, Model and Dancer
- Michael Schneider (disambiguation), several people
- Monique Scheier-Schneider, (born 1954) Luxembourg ice hockey administrator
- Niels Schneider (born 1987), French Canadian Actor
- Nikolaus Schneider (born 1947), German Lutheran bishop
- Oscar Schneider (1927–2024), German politician
- Patrick Schnieder (born 1968), German politician
- Paul Schneider (disambiguation), several people
- Peter Schneider (disambiguation), several people
- Pippa Schneider (born 1994), German politician

=== R–Z ===
- Reinhold Schneider (1903–1958), German author
- Renate Schneider (born 1939), German artistic gymnast
- René Schneider (1913–1970), Chilean general
- Richard Schneider (1919–1982), German football manager
- Rob Schneider (born 1963), comedian
- Robert Schneider, musician
- Robert Schneider (writer) (born 1961)
- Roland Schneider, Swiss curler, 1975 World men's champion
- Roman Schneider (1898–1967), German flying ace
- Romy Schneider (1938–1982), actress, daughter of Magda Schneider
- Ronnie Schneider (1943–2023), American music manager
- Rony Schneider, Israeli association football, coach and commentator
- Rose Schneider (1895–1976) American painter
- Sascha Schneider (1870–1927), German painter
- Siegfried Schneider (disambiguation), several people
- Silke Schneider (born 1967), German politician
- Simone Schneider, German operatic soprano
- Stephen Schneider (scientist), US Stanford University climatologist and environmental biologist
- Stephen Schneider (actor), American actor
- Steve Schneider (American football), American football player
- Steve Schneider (Branch Davidian), American Branch Davidian
- Steve Schneider (computer scientist), British computer scientist
- Tatjana Schneider, British architect and academic
- Theodor Schneider, German mathematician
- Tom Schneider (born 1992), Australian Rules Footballer
- Tony F. Schneider (1917–2010), US Navy pilot
- Vreni Schneider, Swiss alpine skier
- Willi Schneider (1903–1971), Austrian medium
- Willi Schneider (skeleton racer) (born 1963), German skeleton racer
- William Schneider (disambiguation), several people
- Willy Schneider (1905–1989), German singer
- Wolf Schneider (1925–2022), German journalist
- Wolf-Dieter Schneider (metallurgist) (1942–2025), German metallurgist and university professor
- Wolf-Dieter Schneider (physicist) (born 1944), experimental physicist and scientific consultant

== Schneiders ==
- Abraham Louis Schneiders (1925–2020), Dutch writer and diplomat
- Arlette Schneiders (fl. 1989), Luxembourg architect
- Bernt Schneiders (born 1959), Dutch politician
- Grace Schneiders-Howard (1869–1968), Surinamese politician
- Lolita Schneiders (1931–2022), American politician
- Sandra M. Schneiders (born 1936), American academic
- Toni Schneiders (1920–2006), German photographer

== Schneyder ==
- Nathalie Schneyder (born 1968), American synchronised swimmer, Olympic champion
- Werner Schneyder (1937–2019), Austrian cabaret performer, journalist, writer, actor, stage director, television presenter and sports reporter

== Šnajder ==
- Slobodan Šnajder (born 1948), Croatian writer and publicist
- Vera Šnajder (1904–1976, also known as V. Popovitch-Schneider), Bosnian mathematician
- Viktor Šnajder (1934–2014), Croatian sprinter

== Sznajder ==
- Andrew Sznajder (born 1967), English-born Canadian tennis player
- Irena Sznajder (born 1977), Polish sprinter
- Rafał Sznajder (1972–2014), Polish Olympic saber fencer

== Families ==
The Doll Family, a performing group of four siblings with dwarfism from Germany

- Elly Annie "Tiny" Schneider (1914–2004)
- Frieda A. "Gracie" Schneider (1899–1970)
- Kurt Fritz "Harry" Schneider (1902–1985)
- Hilda Emma "Daisy" Schneider (1907–1980)

== Fictional characters ==
- Karl Heinz Schneider from the manga Captain Tsubasa
- Kyle Schneider, a character in the Metal Gear series
- Dwayne Schneider, often simply Schneider, is a character portrayed by Pat Harrington on the American sitcom One Day at a Time
- Friedrich Schneider, in the book Friedrich, by Hans Peter Richter
- Coach Schneider from the movie A Nightmare on Elm Street
- Schneider, a character from the game Reverse 1999
- Dr. Elsa Schneider, a character in Indiana Jones and the Last Crusade
- Dark Schneider, a character from the Manga and Anime Bastard!!

== See also ==
- Schneider (taxonomic authority)
- Snider (surname)
- Snyder
- Snyder (surname)
