= Schnyder =

Schnyder (Swiss Standard German pronunciation: [ˈʃniːdər]) is used in Switzerland as an alternative form of the more common German surname Schneider (tailor). Notable people with the name include:

- Daniel Schnyder (born 1961), Swiss jazz musician and composer
- Fabian Schnyder (born 1985), Swiss ice hockey player
- Felix Schnyder (1910–1992), Swiss lawyer and diplomat
- Franz Schnyder (1910–1993), Swiss film director
- Franz Ludwig Schnyder von Wartensee (1747–1815), Swiss politician and judge
- Franz Xaver Schnyder von Wartensee (1786–1868), Swiss composer
- Gion Schnyder (born 1986), Swiss orienteering and ski orienteering competitor
- Heinrich Ludwig Schnyder von Wartensee (1754–1814), Swiss politician
- Josef Schnyder (1923–2017), Swiss cross country skier
- Jost Schnyder von Wartensee (1752–1824), Swiss officer and politician
- Jost Franz Anton Schnyder von Wartensee (1681–1759), Swiss politician
- Julius Schnyder von Wartensee (1830–1913), Swiss politician
- Michael Schnyder von Wartensee (died 1632), Swiss politician
- Nicolas Schnyder (born 1987), Swiss cyclist
- Nicole Schnyder-Benoit (born 1973), beach volleyball player
- Oliver Schnyder (born 1973), Swiss pianist
- Patty Schnyder (born 1978), Swiss tennis player
- Philippe Schnyder (born 1978), Swiss cyclist
- Rolf W. Schnyder (1935–2011), Swiss businessman
- Rudolf Schnyder (1919–2000), Swiss sport shooter
- Silvia Guignard Schnyder (born 1974), Swiss sport shooter
- Willy Schnyder (1894–1946), Swiss sports shooter

Schnyder is also the namesake of the following:

- Schnyder crystalline corneal dystrophy
- Schnyder's theorem
- Schnyder wood

== See also ==
- Schnider
- Schnyder von Wartensee family
- Snider (surname)
- Snyder (surname)
