= Snyder (surname) =

Snyder is an Anglicized occupational surname derived from Dutch Snijder “tailor” (historically also spelled with “ij”/“y”), and is related to modern Dutch Snijders and Sneijder. It may also be an Anglicized spelling of the German Schneider or Swiss German Schnyder, which carry the same meaning; the name likewise appears in Yiddish as Shnayder (שניידער) and was adopted by many Ashkenazic Jewish families who later anglicized it to Snyder or Snider on immigrating to English-speaking countries.

Notable people with the surname include:

- Alan Snyder (disambiguation), multiple people
- Allen Snyder (disambiguation), multiple people
- Allan Snyder, Australian professor and researcher of the human brain
- Allen Snyder (coach), American college sports coach
- Alice D. Snyder (1887–1943), American educator
- Bill Snyder (born 1939), the head football coach of Kansas State University
- Blake Snyder (1957–2009), American screenwriter and writing mentor
- Brandon Snyder (born 1986), American baseball player and coach
- C. B. J. Snyder (1860–1945), American architect
- Charles P. Snyder (politician) (1847–1915), West Virginia congressman
- Christopher Snyder (historian), medieval historian
- Chris Snyder (born 1981), American baseball player
- Chris Snyder (American football) (born 1974), American football player
- Christopher Snyder (economist) (born 1967), American Economist
- Cole Snyder, college football player
- C. R. Snyder (Charles Richard "Rick" Snyder) (1944–2006), American psychologist
- Dana Snyder (born 1973), American voice actor
- Daniel Snyder (disambiguation), multiple people
- Deborah Snyder, American film producer
- Edward Snyder (1895–1982), American cameraman and cinematographer
- EJ Snyder (Errol James "EJ" Snyder), (born 1965), American survivalist and television personality
- Elizabeth Snyder, soap opera writer
- Ellsworth Snyder (1931–2005), pianist and abstract artist
- Frank Snyder (1895 – 1962), an American professional baseball player and coach
- Frederic Beal Snyder (1859–1951), American lawyer and politician
- Esther Snyder (1920–2006), the co-founder of In-N-Out Burger
- Gary Snyder, poet, essayist, social and environmental activist
- Gene Snyder (baseball), pitcher for the 1959 Dodgers
- George Snyder, Kentucky blacksmith who invented the first American-made fishing reel
- George Snyder (politician) (1929–2017), American politician
- Glenn Snyder, scholar of international relations theory
- Gordon Taylor Snyder, Canadian politician
- Harry Snyder (1913–1976), the co-founder of In-N-Out Burger
- Harry Snyder (scientist) (1867–1927), scientist
- Henry N. Snyder (1865–1949), Methodist educator, author, and president of Wofford College
- J. Buell Snyder (1877–1946), American politician of Pennsylvania
- Jack Snyder, political scientist
- Jacob B. Snyder (1866–1951), American politician and lawyer from Ohio
- James Snyder (disambiguation), multiple people
- Jefferson B. Snyder (1859–1951), American politician of Louisiana
- Jerome Snyder (1916–1976), American Artist
- John Pillsbury Snyder (1888–1959), American businessman and politician
- John Snyder (disambiguation), multiple people
- Julie Snyder, Canadian producer
- Kerala J. Snyder (born 1936), American musicologist and classical organist
- Kirk Snyder, former professional basketball player in the NBA
- Kyle Snyder, Olympic wrestler
- Kyle Snyder, Boston Red Sox pitcher
- Laura J. Snyder (born 1964), American historian, philosopher, and writer
- Leon C. Snyder (1908–1987), Horticulturist and co-founder of Minnesota Landscape Arboretum
- Leroy Snyder (1931–2001), American serial killer
- Liza Snyder (born 1968), American actress
- Louis Leo Snyder, (1907–1993), American-born German scholar
- Lucy A. Snyder, author
- Luke Snyder (bull rider) (born 1982), American bull rider
- Maria V. Snyder, American fantasy author
- Michael James Snyder, American businessman
- Mitch Snyder (1943–1990), advocate for the homeless
- Nick Snyder (born 1995), American baseball player
- Oliver P. Snyder (1833–1882), American politician from Arkansas
- Oliver P. Snyder (Maryland politician) (died 1874), American politician from Maryland
- Patrick Snyder, Wisconsin politician
- Rick Snyder (born 1958), American businessman and politician, former Governor of Michigan
- Robert H. Snyder, Louisiana politician
- Ross S. Snyder, American recording engineer and inventor
- Ruth Brown Snyder (1895–1928), American murderer
- Scott Snyder, American comic book writer
- Simon Snyder, the third Governor of Pennsylvania
- Sid Snyder, American businessman and politician
- Solomon H. Snyder, American neuroscientist
- Tanya Snyder (born 1967), American businesswoman
- Tara Snyder (born in 1977), American tennis player
- Ted Snyder (1881–1965), American lyricist and composer
- Thomas C. Snyder (1843–1906), American politician from Ohio
- Timothy Snyder, American historian
- Tom Snyder, American television personality
- Virgil Snyder (1869–1950), American mathematician
- William T. Snyder (1931–2025), American academic administrator
- Zack Snyder, American filmmaker
- Zilpha Keatley Snyder, American author

== See also ==
- Snider (surname)
