= Georg Schneider =

Georg Schneider may refer to:

- Georg Schneider (footballer, born 1892) (1892–1961), German international footballer
- Georg Schneider (footballer, born 1959) (born 1959), German footballer
- Georg Schneider (politician) (1909–1970), German politician, biologist and university lecturer

== See also ==
- Schneider (surname)
- George Schneider (disambiguation)
- Georges Schneider (1925–1963), Swiss alpine skier
