= Snider (surname) =

Snider is an Anglicized occupational surname derived from Dutch Snijder "tailor" (alternatively spelled "Snyder" in the past, see "ij"/"y"), related to modern Dutch Snijders and Sneijder. It may also be an Anglicized spelling of the German Schneider or Swiss German Schnyder, which both carry the same meaning. The more common Anglicized spelling of the Dutch Snijder is Snyder.

Notable people with the surname include:

- Collin Snider (born 1995), American baseball player
- Duke Snider (1926–2011), American baseball player
- Dee Snider (born 1955), American musician and radio personality
- Malcolm Snider (1947–2022), American football player
- Matt Snider (born 1976), American football player
- Myatt Snider (born 1994), American racecar driver
- Samuel Snider (1845–1928), American politician
- Todd Snider (1966–2025), musician
- Travis Snider (born 1988), American baseball player
- Van Snider (born 1963), American baseball player
- Warner B. Snider (1880–1965), American politician, rancher, and sheriff
- Antonio Snider-Pellegrini (1802–1885), French geographer and scientist
- Jake Snider (born 1976), American musician

== See also ==
- Snyder (surname)
