= Schnyder von Wartensee family =

Family of Sursee and Lucerne

- Wartensee Castle in Neuenkirch, owned by the family from 1647 to around 1833
- Country: Switzerland
- Origin: Sursee
- Founder: Probably Werner Sartor (mentioned 1350), according to family tradition
- Members: Michael; Jost Franz Anton; Franz Ludwig; Jost; Heinrich Ludwig; Franz Xaver; Julius
- Estates: Lordship of Mauensee (1457–1547); Wartensee Castle, Neuenkirch (1647 – around 1833); Tannenfels Castle, Nottwil (since 1955)

The Schnyder von Wartensee family is a council family (Ratsfamilie) of Sursee and Lucerne. Through innkeeping, the cloth trade and mercenary service it gained standing and wealth in the 15th and 16th centuries. It provided 23 avoyers (Schultheissen) of Sursee from the 15th to the 18th century, and it was represented in the Small Council of Lucerne from 1712 to 1798. From 1649 it named itself after Wartensee Castle in Neuenkirch, which it owned from 1647 to around 1833.

== History ==
According to family tradition, the family's progenitor is probably Werner Sartor, who is mentioned in 1350 in the anniversary book (Jahrzeitbuch) of Sursee. Through running the Sonne inn (Wirtshaus zur Sonne) in Sursee, the cloth trade and mercenary service, the family gained standing and wealth in the 15th and 16th centuries. It played a leading role in Sursee, where it provided 23 avoyers (Schultheissen) from the 15th to the 18th century, among them Michael, Franz Ludwig and Heinrich Ludwig. Numerous members of the family held the lucrative posts of steward (Schaffner) of the abbeys of St. Urban and Muri.

In 1492 Jörg acquired the citizenship of Lucerne, which was renewed again and again. The family also belonged to the marriage circle of the families that sat in Lucerne's Small Council. Only after Johann Irene had moved his residence to Lucerne in 1673 did his son Jost Franz Anton, who was born there, meet the conditions for eligibility for government office (Regimentsfähigkeit). He was elected to the Grand Council of Lucerne in 1705 and to the Small Council in 1712, where the family remained represented until 1798. In the 19th century, too, several members of the family held political office, among them Jost and Julius. Jost's son was the composer Franz Xaver Schnyder von Wartensee.

From 1457 to 1547 the family owned the lordship of Mauensee, and from 1647 to around 1833 also Wartensee Castle and its estate in the municipality of Neuenkirch, after which the family named itself from 1649. Since 1955 Tannenfels Castle in Nottwil has belonged to the family.

== Bibliography ==
- T. von Liebenau, Die Familie Schnyder von Wartensee in Sursee und Luzern, 1906
- Schweizerisches Geschlechterbuch, 1, 516–520; 5, 546–551
- Historische Ausstellung anlässlich der 700-Jahr-Feier der Stadt Sursee, 1956
- F. J. Schnyder, "Güterbesitz und Herkommen des Ritters Rudolf von Schauensee und der Rathauser Stifterfamilie Schnyder von Luzern", in HNU 28/29, 1973/74, 66–88
- K. Messmer and P. Hoppe, Luzerner Patriziat, 1976
- A. Willimann, Sursee – die zweite Kapitale des Kantons Luzern, 2006

=== Archives ===
- State Archives of Lucerne (Staatsarchiv Luzern): family archive (Familienarchiv)
