= Michael Schnyder von Wartensee =

Swiss politician (died 1632)

- Died: 21 June 1632; Sursee, Lucerne, Old Swiss Confederacy
- Occupation: Politician
- Spouse: Katharina Pfyffer (m. 1600)
- Parents: Beat Schnyder von Wartensee (father); Maria Barbara Wüest (mother)
- Relatives: Kaspar Pfyffer (father-in-law)

Michael Schnyder von Wartensee (died 21 June 1632) was a Swiss politician from Sursee, a member of the Schnyder von Wartensee family. Between 1581 and 1628 he was avoyer (Schultheiss) of Sursee several times. He was a hard-line supporter of the Counter-Reformation and founded the Capuchin friary of Sursee.

== Biography ==
Michael Schnyder von Wartensee was the son of Beat Schnyder von Wartensee, avoyer (Schultheiss) of Sursee, and Maria Barbara Wüest. In 1600 he married Katharina Pfyffer, daughter of Kaspar Pfyffer.

He owned several inns. From 1574 he was a member of the Grand Council (Grosser Rat) of Sursee, in 1575 master of the marksmen (Schützenmeister), and in 1579–1580 town clerk (Stadtschreiber). From 1580 he was a member of the Small Council (Kleiner Rat), and he succeeded his father in the respected position of administrator (Amtmann) of Muri Abbey. Between 1581 and 1628 he was avoyer of Sursee several times.

Schnyder von Wartensee was a hard-line supporter of the Counter-Reformation and founded the Capuchin friary of Sursee. On behalf of Kaspar Pfyffer he built Mauensee Castle (Schloss Mauensee) in 1605. He died in Sursee on 21 June 1632.

== Bibliography ==
- T. von Liebenau, Die Familie Schnyder von Wartensee in Sursee und Luzern, 1906
