= Stephen Schneider =

Stephen Schneider or Steve Schneider may refer to:

- Stephen Schneider (actor) (born 1980), American actor
- Stephen Schneider (scientist) (1945–2010), American climate scientist
- Steve Schneider (American football), American college football coach and athletic director
- Steve Schneider (Branch Davidian), second-in-command of the Branch Davidians
- Steve Schneider (computer scientist), English computer scientist
