= Franz Ludwig Schnyder von Wartensee =

Swiss politician (1747–1815)

- Born: 6 October 1747; Sursee, Lucerne, Old Swiss Confederacy
- Died: 2 July 1815 (aged 67); Sursee, Lucerne, Switzerland
- Occupation: Politician
- Spouse: Anna Maria Meyer (m. 1780)
- Parents: Georg Johann Karl Christoph Schnyder von Wartensee (father); Maria Beatrix Schumacher (mother)

Franz Ludwig Schnyder von Wartensee (6 October 1747 – 2 July 1815) was a Swiss politician from Sursee in the canton of Lucerne, a member of the Schnyder von Wartensee family. He was the last avoyer (Schultheiss) of Sursee, in 1798, and a judge of the supreme court of the Helvetic Republic from 1798 to 1803. In 1814–1815 he was a member of the cantonal government of Lucerne.

== Biography ==
Franz Ludwig Schnyder von Wartensee was born on 6 October 1747 in Sursee, the son of Georg Johann Karl Christoph Schnyder von Wartensee, avoyer (Schultheiss) of Sursee, and Maria Beatrix Schumacher. In 1780 he married Anna Maria Meyer.

He was administrator (Amtmann) of St. Urban Abbey. In the early 1770s he was in French service, in the Sonnenberg regiment. In 1775 he became a member of the Grand Council (Grosser Rat) of Sursee, and from 1776 he was a member of the Small Council (Kleiner Rat) and treasurer (Säckelmeister). He was avoyer of Sursee in 1782 and, as the last holder of the office, in 1798.

In 1798 Schnyder von Wartensee was a member of the national convention (Nationalkonvent) of Lucerne and of the provisional government, and from 1798 to 1803 a judge of the supreme court of the Helvetic Republic (helvetischer Oberrichter). From 1803 to 1806 he was Amtmann of the district court (Amtsgericht) of Sursee, and in 1811 district governor (Oberamtmann) of Sursee. He sat in the Grand Council of Lucerne from 1809 to 1814 and was a member of the cantonal government (Regierungsrat) in 1814–1815. He was a member of the Helvetic Military Society (Helvetisch-Militärische Gesellschaft). He died in Sursee on 2 July 1815.

== Bibliography ==
- T. von Liebenau, Die Familie Schnyder von Wartensee in Sursee und Luzern, 1906
- P. Bernet, Der Kanton Luzern zur Zeit der Helvetik, 1993

=== Archives ===
- State Archives of Lucerne (Staatsarchiv Luzern): family archive (Familienarchiv), correspondence
