= Jost Franz Anton Schnyder von Wartensee =

Swiss politician (1681–1759)

- Born: 18 August 1681; Lucerne, Old Swiss Confederacy
- Died: 9 March 1759 (aged 77); Lucerne, Old Swiss Confederacy
- Occupation: Politician
- Spouse: Jakobea Pfyffer von Altishofen (m. 1703)
- Parents: Johann Irene Schnyder von Wartensee (father); Maria Jakobea Schumacher (mother)

Jost Franz Anton Schnyder von Wartensee (18 August 1681 – 9 March 1759) was a Swiss politician from Lucerne, a member of the Schnyder von Wartensee family. He was a member of Lucerne's Small Council from 1712 and Statthalter (deputy avoyer) in 1742, and between 1709 and 1757 he was bailiff (Vogt) of several Lucerne bailiwicks.

== Biography ==
Jost Franz Anton Schnyder von Wartensee was born on 18 August 1681 in Lucerne, the son of Johann Irene Schnyder von Wartensee and Maria Jakobea Schumacher. In 1703 he married Jakobea Pfyffer von Altishofen, daughter of Christoph Pfyffer von Altishofen, a member of the Small Council.

Only after his father had moved his residence to Lucerne in 1673 did Jost Franz Anton, who was born there, meet the conditions for eligibility for government office (Regimentsfähigkeit) in Lucerne. After his election to the Small Council in 1712, the family remained represented there until 1798.

From 1705 Schnyder von Wartensee was a member of the Grand Council of Lucerne, and from 1712 of the Small Council. In 1742 he was Statthalter. He was bailiff (Vogt) of Knutwil in 1709–1711, of Ruswil in 1715–1717 and 1729–1731, of Beromünster in 1721–1723, of Rothenburg in 1733–1735, 1739–1741 and 1747–1749, and of Merenschwand in 1743–1745, 1746–1747, 1751–1753 and 1755–1757.

He was a council judge (Ratsrichter) in 1713 and 1715, and from 1718 to 1720 an envoy to the transalpine bailiwicks (ennetbirgische Vogteien). From 1723 to 1758 he was chief master of the hunt (Oberstjägermeister), from 1727 to about 1743 inspector of the boundaries (Landmarchen), and in 1737–1738 and 1742–1754 excise collector (Umgeldner). He was an envoy to the Federal Diet (Tagsatzung) on some occasions. From 1752 to 1759 he was banneret of the marksmen (Schützenvenner) of the Greater Town (Grossstadt). He was lord (Herr) of Wartensee. He died in Lucerne on 9 March 1759.

== Bibliography ==
- T. von Liebenau, Die Familie Schnyder von Wartensee in Sursee und Luzern, 1906
