= European Path to Peace =

Artistic project conceived by the German painter and sculptor Otto Freundlich

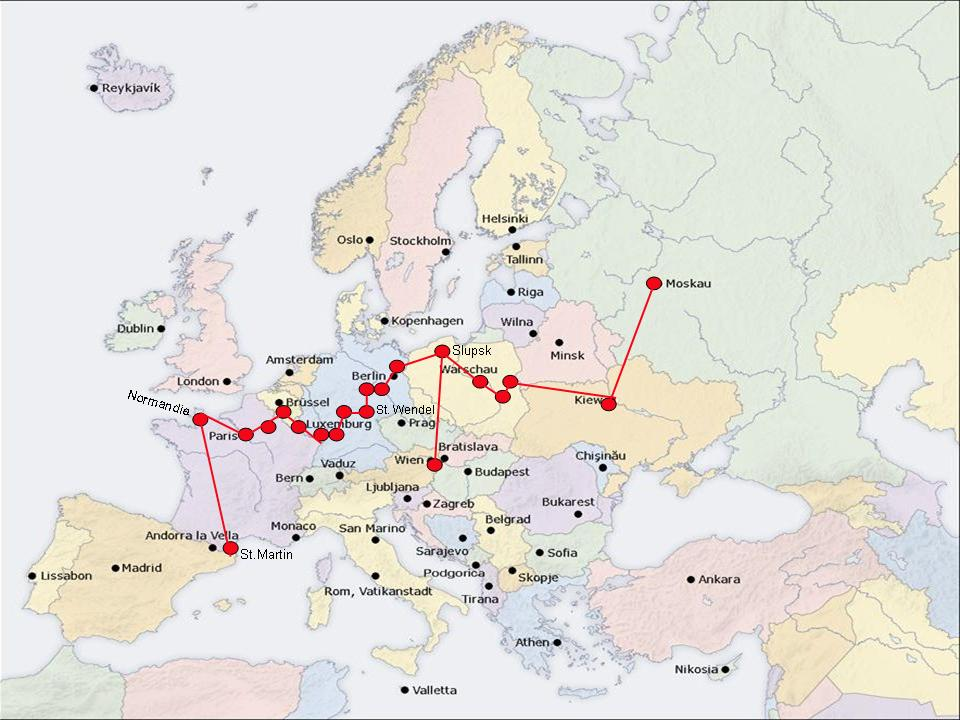
European path to peace

The European Path to Peace is an artistic project conceived by the German painter and sculptor Otto Freundlich (1887-1943) and his wife Jeanne Kosnick-Kloss. A victim of Nazism, Otto Freundlich was unable to realize this project. It was taken up again in 1971 by the German sculptor Leo Kornbrust.

== History ==
In the 1920s, the German-Jewish humanist and pacifist artist Otto Freundlich, along with his wife Jeanne Kosnick-Kloss, developed the idea of a "sculpture route from Paris to Moscow" (original name: A Route of Fraternity and Human Solidarity).

He envisioned it as a path of fraternity and human solidarity, a visible sign of the rejection of war and human violence, and of the peaceful coexistence of different nations.After years of exile in France and following his murder by the Nazis at the Majdanek concentration camp, Otto Freundlich was no longer able to realize his idea. The artist from Saint-Wendel, Leo Kornbrust, took up Freundlich's idea in 1971 and created a sculpture trail in the Saint-Wendel region, as a tribute to the artist he admired and as the first section of a "path of peace."

Leo Kornbrust wants to further develop this path of peace in the Freundlich sense; it should extend across Europe from Normandy to Moscow. . Like Kornbrust, the Merzig-based painter and sculptor Paul Schneider has integrated his "Stones at the Border" sculpture trail in the Sargovia highlands, comprising some thirty sculptures (as of 2007), into the path of peace.
