= Irene C. Peden =

American engineer (1925–2025)

Irene Carswell Peden
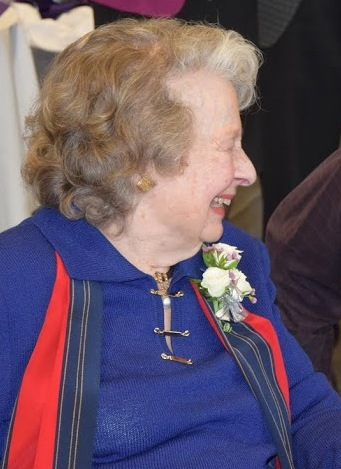
- Peden celebrating her 90th birthday, 2015
- Born: Irene Carswell; September 25, 1925; Topeka, Kansas, U.S.
- Died: August 22, 2025 (aged 99)
- Known for: Pioneering work in Antarctica

Academic background
- Education: Stanford University; University of Colorado Boulder; Kansas City Junior College
- Thesis: Experimental investigation of transmission-line representations of microwave periodic circuits (1962)

Academic work
- Doctoral students: John Brand Schneider
- Main interests: applied electromagnetics radio science antennas subsurface remote sensing

Irene Carswell Peden (September 25, 1925 – August 22, 2025) was an American electrical engineer who is known for being the first American woman engineer or scientist to live and work in the interior of the Antarctic. There she developed new methods to analyze the deep glacial ice by studying the effect it has on radio waves. A Fellow of the Institute of Electrical and Electronics Engineers where she broke a number of barriers and received significant awards, her many other awards include the Society of Women Engineers' Achievement Award in 1973 and election to the National Academy of Engineering.

== Early life and education ==
Born on September 25, 1925, in Topeka, Kansas, Irene was the oldest of three girls, her mother was also the oldest child of four, in a Swedish immigrant family. Her mother was a school teacher in math and music education. Her father was in the automobile business. Irene graduated from Central High School in Kansas City, Missouri. She started college at Kansas City Junior College, the only institution her family could afford. It was there that she fell in love with physics. One of her professors there suggested she pursue a four-year degree - in electrical engineering. She decided that the University of Colorado Boulder was a manageable distance from home and off she went. In 1947, she graduated from the University of Colorado Boulder with a bachelor's degree in electrical engineering.

== Professional career and doctoral education ==
Irene and her first husband moved to Wilmington, Delaware subsequent to her 1947 graduation. After much effort on her part, she found a job as a junior engineer for Delaware Power and Light Company. When her husband got admitted to graduate school at Stanford University in 1949, they relocated to California. Peden got a job at the Antenna Lab of the Stanford Research Institute, one of the few places willing to hire a woman. While working, she decided she wanted to pursue graduate education and started working on her master’s degree part time. Taking a leave of absence, she completed her master's degree in 1958 and earned her PhD in 1962, both degrees in electrical engineering. She conducted research for her doctoral dissertation in the Stanford Microwave Lab with a research topic of measurement techniques for microwave periodic circuits.

By now divorced, Peden moved to Seattle, Washington in 1961 to become an assistant professor in the electrical engineering department at the University of Washington. Upon her arrival, she realized that her research focus would need to change from microwave work to something else. That something else became upper atmospheric research – polar research – in the Antarctic as it related to radio waves. She became the co-project investigator on a National Science Foundation grant the purpose of which was to examine the impact of the ice on antenna signals.

The National Science Foundation policy required principal investigators of Antarctic research projects to spend time on-site so that they could understand the region and the weather and the associated difficulties in conducting research. But the U.S. Navy did not want women in Antarctica. Peden overcame a significant series of objections and obstacles and in 1970 became the first American woman engineer or scientist to conduct research in Antarctica.

Through her research, Peden developed new methods of characterizing the ice by examining the effects it had on radio waves transmitted through it. She and her team were the first to measure many of the electrical properties of the Antarctic ice and to specify the characteristics of the very low frequency propagation over long paths of ice surface in the polar region. This was accomplished through the development of mathematical models to analyze the data. Later in her career, when she focused on subsurface exploration techniques using very high frequency radio waves, she again developed mathematical models to interpret the collected data.

Peden spent the rest of her career at the University of Washington. She was promoted to full professor in 1971. She served as an associate dean of engineering from 1973 to 1977, and then the associate chair of the electrical engineering department from 1983 to 1986. She also served as Director, Division of Electrical and Communication Systems at the National Science Foundation. She retired as Professor Emerita of electrical engineering at the University of Washington in 2002.

== Memberships ==
Peden participated extensively in professional organizations. She was quite active and rose to leadership in most. She was a member of the Society of Women Engineers, helped form the collegiate section of the Society of Women Engineers at the University of Washington, served as its Faculty Advisor and also participated in her local professional section of the Society of Women Engineers, the Pacific Northwest Section, including as its President.

She was a trailblazer within the Institute of Electrical and Electronics Engineers, active at the local and national levels. She was the first female president of the IEEE and thus the first woman to serve on its board of directors. At one point, the General Manager of IEEE called her “Number One Woman in the IEEE”. She also served on editorial boards within the organization.

Peden served on national advisory committees and on the advisory committee to the Stanford University School of Engineering. She served on the Advisory Board of the United States Merchant Marine Academy. She also served on the United States Army Science Board and later chaired that Board. She served on the Governor’s Commission on the Status of Women. She was active in ABET and chaired ABET's Engineering Accreditation Commission. She also served on the ABET Board of Directors.

== Personal life and death ==
After her arrival in Seattle, Washington in 1961, she met and married attorney Lee Peden, who was divorced and had two teenage daughters. She died on August 22, 2025, at the age of 99.

== Awards and honors ==
Peden received the Society of Women Engineers' Achievement Award in 1973 1973 “In recognition of her significant contributions in the fields of radio wave propagation research and electrical engineering education.” She was elected a Fellow of the Society of Women Engineers as well as a Fellow of the IEEE, AAAS, ASEE, ABET and the Explorer’s Club. She received the U.S. Army's Outstanding Civilian Service Medal in 1987 for her research and work in the Antarctic.

Peden was elected to the National Academy of Engineering in 1993 for her leadership in engineering education in antennas and propagation and contributions to radioscience in the polar region. Also that same year, the National Science Foundation named her as the Engineer of the Year. Among her other numerous awards she was inducted into the ASEE Engineering Educators Hall of Fame. IEEE honored her with their Distinguished Achievement Award, the Centennial Medal in 1984, the 1988 Haraden Pratt Award and Third Millennium Medal for 2000. Irene Peden received the Diamond Award from the University of Washington in 2018 which is given to alumni and others who have made great strides in the field of engineering. She also received distinguished aluma awards and honorary doctorates.

== Advocacy ==
Peden advocated for women in science, technology, engineering, and mathematics for decades. She also fought for equal treatment for women including through conducting salary surveys at the University of Washington. She worked to expand pre-college engineering education. She fought for equal opportunity for her work and research.

== Legacy ==
Peden was the first American woman engineer or scientist to live and work in Antarctica. She was the first woman to receive a PhD from Stanford University in electrical engineering and possibly the first woman to receive a PhD in any engineering field from Stanford University. She was the first woman faculty member in engineering at the University of Washington. In addition, she was the first woman on the board of directors of the Institute of Electrical and Electronics Engineers. She was the first woman selected to the Advisory Board of the United States Merchant Marine Academy.

== Additional reading ==
Tietjen, Jill S. (2025). Chapter 28 "Irene Carswell Peden". In Craig, Cecilia; Teig, Holly; Kimberling, Debra; Williams, Janet; Tietjen, Jill; Johnson, Vicki (eds.). Women Engineering Legends 1952-1976: Society of Women Engineers Achievement Award Recipients. Springer Cham. ISBN 978-3-032-00223-5

== Sources ==
- NAE (1993). "Dr. Irene C. Peden". Members directory. National Academy of Engineering.
- SWE (13 March 2008). "Irene Peden". Engineering Pioneers. Society of Women Engineers. Archived from the original on 25 September 2015.
- Peden, Irene C. (1998). "If You Fail, There Won't Be Another Woman on the Antarctic Continent for a Generation". In Rothblum, Ester D.; Weinstock, Jackqueline S.; Morris, Jessica F. (eds.). Women in the Antarctic. Binghamton, New York: The Haworth Press. pp. 17–30. ISBN 0-7890-0247-7.
- Peden, Irene (2 March 2002a). "SWE Pioneers" (PDF). Society of Women Engineers (Interview). Interviewed by Kata, Lauren. Archived from the original (PDF) on 24 February 2016.
- Peden, Irene (8 May 2002b). "Interview" (PDF). Polar Oral History Program (Interview). Interviewed by Shoemaker, Brian. Seattle, Washington.
- Smith, George S. (August 1969). "Early History of the Department of Electrical Engineering" (PDF). University of Washington. Archived from the original (PDF) on 3 March 2016.
- Stanley, Autumn (1993). Mothers and Daughters of Invention: Notes for a Revised History of Technology. New Brunswick, New Jersey: Rutgers University Press. pp. 387–388. ISBN 0-8135-2197-1.
- Wayne, Tiffany K. (2011). "Peden, Irene (Carswell)". American Women of Science Since 1900: Essays A-H. Vol. 1. Santa Barbara, California: ABC-CLIO. pp. 113, 754–756. ISBN 978-1-59884-158-9.
