= Schnaider =

Schnaider or Schnayder is a transliteration variant of Schneider. Notable people with the surname include:

- Ksenia Schnaider
- Jose Martinez-Zorilla, or José Claudio Martínez-Zorilla Schnaider (1912–1989), Mexican player of American football
