= The Other Shore (album) =

Studio album by Aly & Fila
- Released: October 3, 2014
- Genre: Trance, Uplifting Trance, Electronica
- Length: 1:08:58
- Label: Armada Music

Aly & Fila chronology
Quiet Storm (2013)	The Other Shore (2014)	The Chill Out (2015)

The Other Shore is the third studio album of Egyptian trance music duo Aly & Fila. It was released on October 3, 2014 through Armada Music.

== Track listing ==
No.	Title	Writer(s)	Length
1.	"In My Mind" (featuring Karim Youseff and May Hassan)	Aly El Sayed Amr Fathalla/Fadi Wassef Naguib/Karim Youssef/May Hassan	3:39
2.	"White Wave"	Aly El Sayed Amr Fathalla/Fadi Wassef Naguib	4:56
3.	"Nubia" (with Ferry Tayle)	Aly El Sayed Amr Fathalla/Fadi Wassef Naguib/Ludovic Meyer	4:16
4.	"Universelab" (with Stoneface & Terminal)	Aly El Sayed Amr Fathalla/Fadi Wassef Naguib/Henry Nix/Matthias Gierth	5:17
5.	"Never Let Me Go" (featuring Seri)	Aly El Sayed Amr Fathalla/Fadi Wassef Naguib/Sharon Hung	3:45
6.	"For All Time" (with Jaren)	Aly El Sayed Amr Fathalla/Fadi Wassef Naguib/Jaren Cerf	4:33
7.	"Altitude Compensation"	Aly El Sayed Amr Fathalla/Fadi Wassef Naguib	5:59
8.	"Along the Edge"	Aly El Sayed Amr Fathalla/Fadi Wassef Naguib	5:24
9.	"Eye 2 Eye (FSOE350 Anthem)" (with Roger Shah, featuring Sylvia Tosun)	Aly El Sayed Amr Fathalla/Fadi Wassef Naguib/Roger P. Shah/Anton Bass/Sylvia Tosun	3:46
10.	"The Other Shore" (with Aruna)	Aly El Sayed Amr Fathalla/Fadi Wassef Naguib/Aruna Abrams	3:23
11.	"Underwater"	Aly El Sayed Amr Fathalla/Fadi Wassef Naguib	4:54
12.	"Running" (with SkyPatrol, featuring Sue McLaren)	Aly El Sayed Amr Fathalla/Fadi Wassef Naguib/Susan McLaren	5:44
13.	"Full Throttle" (with Sneijder)	Aly El Sayed Amr Fathalla/Fadi Wassef Naguib/Andrew Liggett	3:19
14.	"Is It Love" (featuring Ever Burn)	Aly El Sayed Amr Fathalla/Fadi Wassef Naguib/Evelyn	5:30
15.	"Shine" (featuring Roxanne Emery)	Aly El Sayed Amr Fathalla/Fadi Wassef Naguib/Roxanne Emery	4:32

== Charts ==
Chart (2014)	Peak position
Dutch Albums (Album Top 100)	39
