= Tannenfels Castle =

Tannenfels Castle may refer to:

- Tannenfels Castle (Nottwil), a castle in Nottwil, canton of Lucerne, Switzerland
- Tannenfels Castle (Palatinate), a ruined castle above Dannenfels, Rhineland-Palatinate, Germany
