= Heinrich Ludwig Schnyder von Wartensee =

Swiss politician (1754–1814)

- Born: 20 August 1754; Sursee, Lucerne, Old Swiss Confederacy
- Died: 2 November 1814 (aged 60); Sursee, Lucerne, Switzerland
- Occupation: Politician
- Spouse: Maria Bernarda Meyer (m. 1780)
- Parents: Franz Jakob Schnyder von Wartensee (father); Maria Jakobea Krus (mother)

Heinrich Ludwig Schnyder von Wartensee (20 August 1754 – 2 November 1814) was a Swiss politician from Sursee in the canton of Lucerne, a member of the Schnyder von Wartensee family. He was avoyer (Schultheiss) of Sursee in 1796–1797, a member of the Grand Council and the Small Council of Lucerne from 1803 to 1814, and an envoy to the Federal Diet (Tagsatzung) from 1803 to 1810.

== Biography ==
Heinrich Ludwig Schnyder von Wartensee was born on 20 August 1754 in Sursee, the son of Franz Jakob Schnyder von Wartensee, administrator (Amtmann) of Muri Abbey, and Maria Jakobea Krus. In 1780 he married Maria Bernarda Meyer.

From 1778 to 1798 he was a member of the Grand Council (Grosser Rat) of Sursee. He was town clerk (Stadtschreiber) from 1782 to 1794, treasurer (Seckelmeister) from 1794 to 1796 and avoyer of Sursee in 1796–1797. In 1798 he was a substitute member (Suppleant) of the provisional council, and from 1798 to 1800 president of the municipality (Munizipalität) of Sursee.

From 1803 to 1814 Schnyder von Wartensee was a member of the Grand Council and of the Small Council (Kleiner Rat) of Lucerne, where he was state treasurer (Staatsseckelmeister) of the chamber of finance and economy and president of the police chamber (Polizeikammer). From 1803 to 1810 he was an envoy to the Federal Diet. He was a member of the Helvetic Society. He died in Sursee on 2 November 1814.

== Bibliography ==
- R. Abplanalp, "zu einem ratsherrn gar nit erzogen", licentiate thesis, University of Zurich, 1990
- H. Bossard-Borner, Im Bann der Revolution, 1998
