= George Schneider =

George Schneider may refer to:

- Georg Abraham Schneider (1770–1839), German composer and instrumentalist
- George J. Schneider (1877–1939), U.S. Representative from Wisconsin
- George Schneider (banker) (1823–1905), Illinois journalist and banker
- George Schneider (Medal of Honor) (1844–1929), United States Army sergeant and recipient of the U.S. Medal of Honor
- George Yurii Schneider (1908–2002), Ukrainian-American professor, linguist, philologist, literary historian, and literary critic of Jewish heritage

== See also ==
- Schneider (surname)
- Georg Schneider (disambiguation)
- Georges Schneider (1925–1963), Swiss alpine skier
