= Bailiwick of Knutwil =

Former bailiwick of Lucerne, Switzerland

Bailiwick of Knutwil Landvogtei Knutwil
- Bailiwick of Lucerne
- until 1798
- Territory of the bailiwick

The Bailiwick of Knutwil (German: Landvogtei Knutwil) was a small bailiwick of Lucerne until 1798. It comprised what are today Knutwil, Mauensee and Kaltbach. The lordship (Herrschaft) of Knutwil had been sold by the counts of Frohburg in 1280; Lucerne acquired the blood court over Knutwil in 1407 and the lower sovereign rights in 1579, and administered it as a bailiwick with its own customary law.

== History ==
The counts of Frohburg sold the lordship of Knutwil in 1280 to the ministeriales of Ifenthal. They in turn transferred the low courts, the manorial lordship and the lordship over serfs (Grund- und Leibherrschaft) to the collegiate chapter (Stift) of Zofingen, and the high courts to the Habsburg county of Willisau. When Lucerne bought the county in 1407, it acquired the blood court over Knutwil. The other lordly rights, among them the court for minor offenses (Frevelgericht), remained disputed between Lucerne and Bern, which owned the chapter of Zofingen from the Reformation onward.

In 1579 the manorial lordship passed to St. Urban Abbey in an exchange, serfdom was redeemed, and the lower sovereign rights went to Lucerne. Lucerne administered Knutwil until 1798 as a small bailiwick with its own customary law (Amtsrecht), while the blood court remained with the bailiwick of Willisau. The bailiff (Landvogt) was taken from the Grand Council. The bailiwick comprised what are today Knutwil, Mauensee and Kaltbach. In 1798 it was incorporated into the Helvetic district of Sursee, and in 1803 into the Amt of Sursee.

== Bibliography ==
- F. Glauser, J. J. Siegrist, Die Luzerner Pfarreien und Landvogteien, 1977
- A. Bickel, Willisau, 1982
