= Julius Schnyder von Wartensee =

Swiss politician (1830–1913)

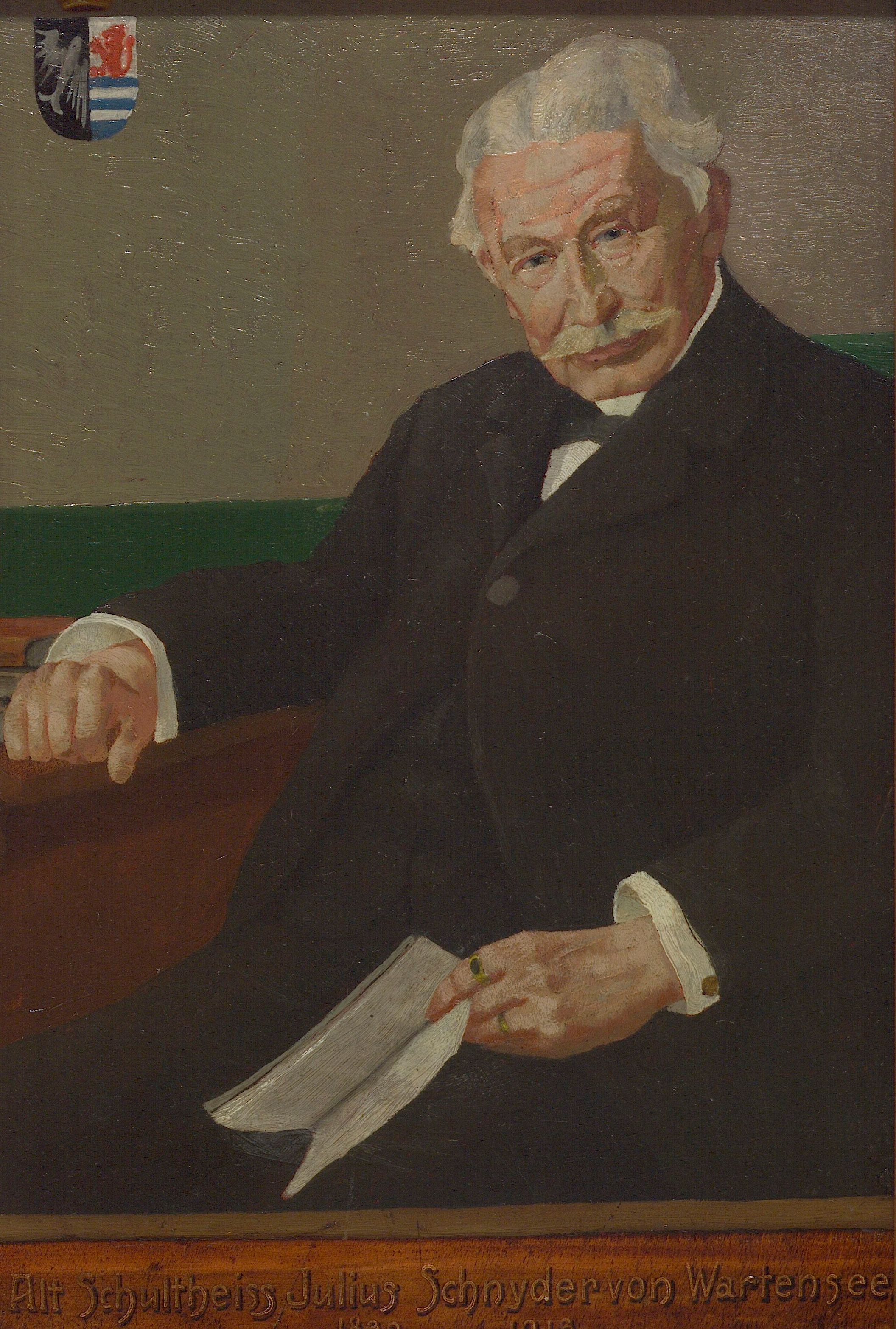
- Born: 9 February 1830; Sursee, Lucerne, Switzerland
- Died: 28 December 1913 (aged 83); Lucerne, Switzerland
- Occupation: Politician
- Spouse: Eugenia Crivelli
- Parents: Ludwig Schnyder von Wartensee (father); Josefa Beck (mother)
- Relatives: Karl Emanuel Müller (brother-in-law)

Julius Schnyder von Wartensee (9 February 1830 – 28 December 1913) was a Swiss Catholic conservative politician from Sursee in the canton of Lucerne, a member of the Schnyder von Wartensee family. He was mayor of Sursee from 1863 to 1871, a member of the Lucerne cantonal government from 1871 to 1891 and a member of the Council of States in 1885–1886.

== Biography ==
Julius Schnyder von Wartensee was born on 9 February 1830 in Sursee, the son of Ludwig Schnyder von Wartensee, steward (Schaffner) of St. Urban Abbey and owner of the Menzberg spa hotel (Kurhaus), and Josefa née Beck. He was the brother-in-law of Karl Emanuel Müller. He married Eugenia Crivelli, daughter of Carl Crivelli, a Lucerne banker.

He attended schools in Sursee and Lucerne and studied law and political science in Munich and Paris. He owned a farm, and in the 1860s he worked as a banking professional at the bank Sebastian Crivelli & Co. in Lucerne.

From 1851 to 1863 Schnyder von Wartensee was a member of the board for the poor and orphans (Armen- und Waisenrat) of Sursee, and from 1863 to 1871 he was mayor (Stadtpräsident) of Sursee. He sat in the Grand Council (Grossrat) of Lucerne as a Catholic conservative from 1857 to 1871 and from 1891 to 1895. From 1871 to 1891 he was a member of the cantonal government (Regierungsrat), in charge of the economy (Staatswirtschaft) and finance, and in 1885–1886 he sat in the Council of States. He was a member of the conservative Sursee committee and one of the initiators of the revision movement (Revisionsbewegung) of 1869. He held numerous seats on boards of directors.

Schnyder von Wartensee was a promoter of the Rathausen orphanage (Waisenanstalt Rathausen) and a member of the Schweizerischer Studentenverein. He died in Lucerne on 28 December 1913.

== Bibliography ==
- R. Bussmann, Luzerner Grossratsbiogr. (Staatsarchiv Luzern)
- E. Gruner, Die Schweizerische Bundesversammlung 1848–1920, 1, 1966, 275

=== Archives ===
- Staatsarchiv Luzern: government council records (Regierungsratsmaterialien)
