= John Snyder =

John Snyder may refer to:

== Politics ==
- John Snyder (Pennsylvania politician) (1793–1850), American politician from Pennsylvania
- J. Buell Snyder (1877–1946), American politician from Pennsylvania
- John Wesley Snyder (1895–1985), American business manager & government administrator
- John Snyder (Florida politician) (born 1987), American politician in the Florida House of Representatives
- John M. Snyder (1938–2017), American gun lobbyist

== Arts and entertainment ==
- John K. Snyder III (born 1961), comic artist
- John T. Snyder, American games artist
- John Snyder (producer)

== Other ==
- John Snyder (baseball) (born 1974), American baseball player
- John Wesley Snyder (rancher) (1837–1922) American rancher
- John Otterbein Snyder (1867–1943), American zoologist
- John J. Snyder (1925-2019), American Roman Catholic bishop
- John P. Snyder (1926–1997), American cartographer

== See also ==
- Jack Snyder (disambiguation)
- Jonathan Snyder (disambiguation)
- John Schneider (disambiguation)
