= John Schneider =

John Schneider may refer to:

== Arts and entertainment ==
- John Schneider (guitarist) (born 1950), American classical music guitarist
- John Schneider (screen actor) (born 1960), American actor and country music singer
- John Schneider (stage actor), American actor, theatre director, playwright and musician

== Politics ==
- John Schneider Jr. (1918–1985), American politician
- John D. Schneider (1937–2017), American politician
- John R. Schneider (1937–2002), American politician

== Sports ==
- John Schneider (American football player) (1894–1957), American football wingback
- John Schneider (American football executive) (born 1971), Seattle Seahawks president and general manager
- John Schneider (baseball) (born 1980), American baseball manager
- John Schneider (Canadian football) (born 1945), Canadian football quarterback
- John Schneider (racing driver) (born 1938), American racing driver

== Others ==
- John A. Schneider (1926–2019), president of the CBS Television Network
- John Brand Schneider, engineer
- John Henry Powell Schneider, merchant in London
- John Metz Schneider (1859–1942), Canadian businessman and founder of Schneider Foods

== See also ==
- John Snyder (disambiguation)
