= Shnaider (surname) =

Shnaider or Shnayder are surnames, variants of Schneider as transliterated from the Russified spelling Шнайдер. It may refer to:

- Alex Shnaider (born 1968), Canadian businessman
- Diana Shnaider (born 2004), Russian tennis player
- Dmitry Shnayder (born 1976), Kyrgyzstani athlete
- Shaya Shnayder, birth name of Sacha Moldovan, Russian-born American expressionist and post-impressionist painter
