= Shneider (surname) =

Shneider or Shneyder are surnames, variants of Schneider as transliterated from the Russified spelling . It may refer to:

- Natasha Shneider (1956–2008), Latvian-born Soviet-American musician and actress
- Sid Shneider, a founder of Child World
- Yurii Shneider, birth name of George Shevelov
- Mikhail Shneyder, president of the Nightingale College (as of 2020)
