= Council of Two Hundred =

Swiss and Genevan legislatures before the French Revolution

The Councils of Two Hundred (German: Rat der Zweihundert; French: Conseil des Deux-Cents), originally "Grand Council" (Grosser Rat or Grand Conseil), were the legislative authorities in four Swiss cities (Zürich, Bern, Fribourg, Basel), as well as in the independent Republic of Geneva prior to the French Revolution. Although the council in Geneva dates to 1526, the councils were medieval in origin. They often comprised approximately 200 members (whence their name), but sometimes contained as many as 300.

They were later on replaced by smaller legislatures, with again the name of "Grand Council".

== See also ==
- Bourgeoisie of Geneva

== Bibliography ==
- "Grand Council (Ancien Régime)" in German, French and Italian in the online Historical Dictionary of Switzerland.
