= Charles Schneider =

Charles Schneider may refer to:

- Charles Conrad Schneider (1843–1916), civil engineer and bridge designer
- Charles Sumner Schneider (1874–1932), architect
- Charles Schneider (politician) (born 1973), member of the Iowa Senate
- Charles Schneider (businessman) (1898–1960), French businessman

== See also ==
- Charles W. Schneider House
