= Shira Broschat =

American electrical engineer

Shira Lynn Broschat is an American computer scientist whose research topics have included ultrasound imaging and the use of machine learning to model antimicrobial agents. She is a professor and DEI Chair in the Washington State University School of Electrical Engineering & Computer Science, with affiliate professorships in the Department of Veterinary Microbiology Pathology and Paul G. Allen School for Global Health.

== Education and career ==
Broschat is the daughter of Asako Maida Tokuno and Shiro Tokuno, Japanese-Americans who were both interned in the Topaz War Relocation Center during World War II. Their story was recounted in the 2007 television documentary The War. As Shira Tokuno, she graduated from Norte Del Rio High School in Sacramento, California. She became a student at the University of California, Santa Cruz, supported by a scholarship from the Japanese American Citizens League,, as well as other scholarships.

Returning to school in the 1980s, Broschat studied electrical engineering at the University of Washington, earning a bachelor's degree in 1982, a master's degree in 1985, and a Ph.D. in 1988. Her master's research concerned microwave-induced hyperthermia therapy for cancer, but by the time of her doctoral research, she had shifted to wave scattering from randomly rough surfaces.

She joined the Washington State University faculty in 1989.

== Recognition ==
Broschat was a 1992 recipient of the National Science Foundation Presidential Faculty Fellow Award. She was named as a Fellow of the Acoustical Society of America, in the 2000 class of fellows, "for contributions to scattering and biomedical acoustics". She is a 2004 Fellow of the Institute of Physics, and in 2010 was named as an IEEE Fellow, "for contributions to modeling of rough surface electromagnetic scattering".

== Personal life ==
Broschat is married to John Brand Schneider, an electrical engineer at Washington State University; they have two children.
