= Paul Schneider =

Paul Schneider may refer to:

- Paul Schneider (painter) (1884–1969), last court painter of Wilhelm II of the German Empire
- Paul Schneider (pastor) (1897–1939), German pastor martyred during the Holocaust
- Paul Schneider (screenwriter) (1923–2008), American television writer
- Paul Schneider (artist) (1927–2021), German artist and sculptor
- Paul Schneider (author) (born 1962), American author of non-fiction books and magazine articles
- Paul Schneider (actor) (born 1976), American film actor
- Paul Schneider (soccer) (born 1976), American who played professionally in the USL A-League
- Paul Schneider (director), American film and television director
- Paul A. Schneider (born 1944), Deputy Secretary of the US Department of Homeland Security 2008–2009
- Paul Schneider-Esleben (1915–2005), German modernist architect
- Perla (drag queen), Canadian drag queen born Paul Schneider
