= Jack Snyder =

Jack Snyder may refer to:

- Jack Snyder (As the World Turns), fictional character in the TV series As the World Turns
- Jack Snyder (political scientist) (born 1951), American academic
- Jack Snyder (baseball) (1886–1981), American baseball player

== See also ==
- John Snyder (disambiguation)
- Jack Schneider (1883–1958), American college football player and coach
