= Tannenfels Castle (Nottwil) =

Castle in Nottwil, Switzerland

- Schloss Tannenfels
- Nottwil, canton of Lucerne
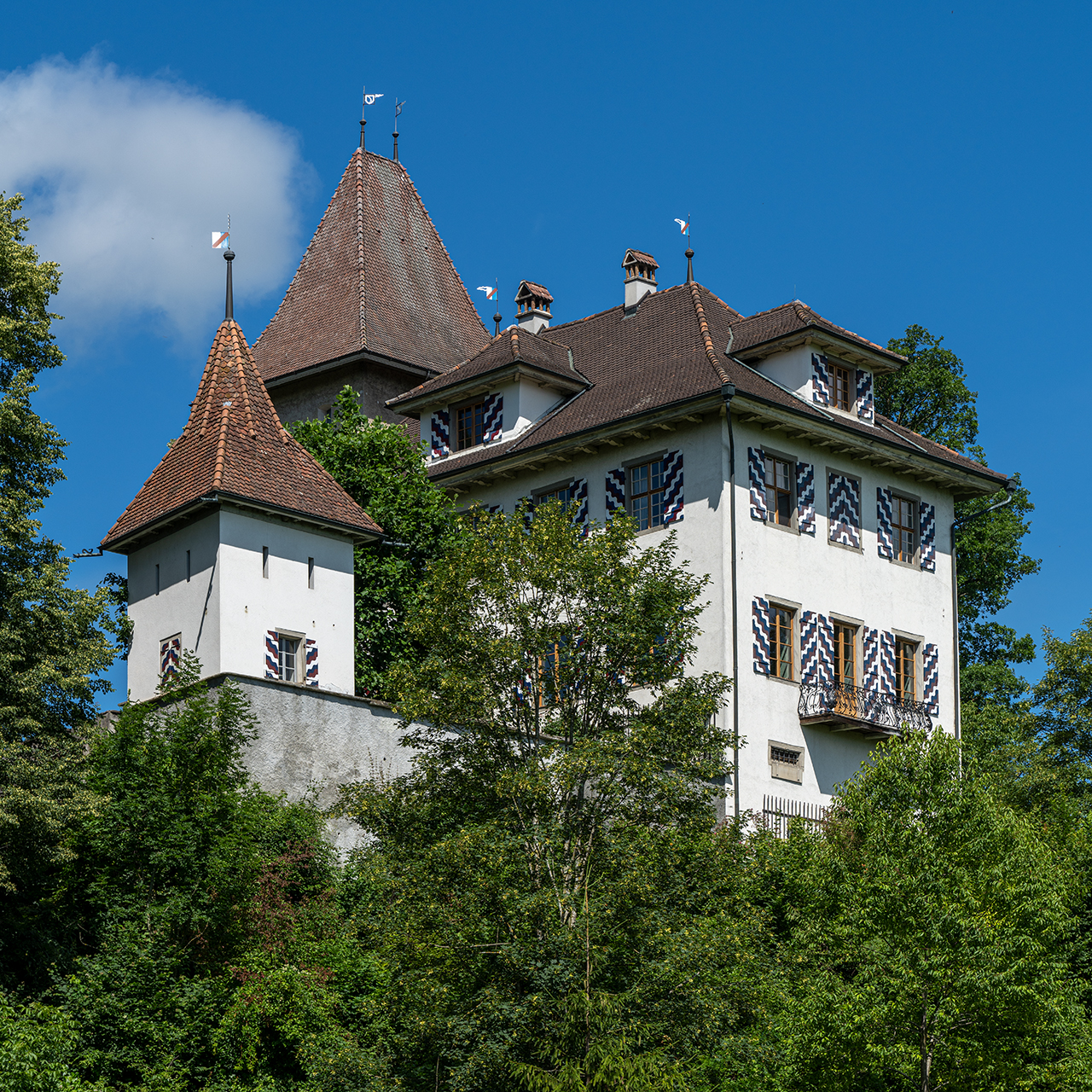
- Tannenfels Castle in 2020

Site information
- Type: Castle
- Condition: Remodeled in the Baroque style in 1752; tower added in 1912

Location
- Coordinates: 47.13645°N 8.108926°E

Site history
- Built by: Probably the Kyburg ministeriales of Sursee-Tannenfels

Tannenfels Castle (German: Schloss Tannenfels) is a castle in the municipality of Nottwil in the canton of Lucerne, Switzerland. From the late Middle Ages until 1798 the castle and the farm (Hof) of Tannenfels formed the core of the small lordship of Tannenfels, which comprised estates and rights mainly in the surrounding hamlets. Around 1348 the lordship was sold to the Teutonic Order, which set up a small commandery there; according to the chronicles, the commandery was destroyed in the Sempach War of 1386, and it was dissolved. The castle ruin was rebuilt by Johann Kaspar Mayr von Baldegg, to whom the lordship passed in 1687.

== History ==
Tannenfels Castle in an anonymous 18th-century view (Zentralbibliothek Zürich)

The castle was probably built by the Kyburg ministeriales of Sursee-Tannenfels; around 1250 Werner von Sursee is first mentioned with the byname Tannenfels. From the end of the 13th century the castle was held as a fief from the counts of Neuchâtel; the fief comprised the local lordship (Twing) of Tannenfels and the Twing and tithe of Buttisholz. The estates and rights of the lordship lay mainly in the surrounding hamlets of Ei, Gattwil, Iflikon and St. Margrethen.

Around 1348 Katharina von Wessenberg, the widow of Burkhard von Tannenfels, sold the lordship, together with Kasteln Castle in the municipality of Menznau, to the Teutonic Order; the counts of Neuchâtel gave their consent in 1365. The small, newly established commandery of the military order at Tannenfels is first recorded in 1349. In 1375 it received the right of patronage (Kirchensatz) of Trachselwald. Only two of its commanders (Komture) are known. According to the chronicles, the commandery was destroyed in the Sempach War of 1386; it was dissolved, and its estates and rights were taken over by the commandery of Hitzkirch.

Tannenfels lay within the high-justice district of the Michelsamt, but in 1443 the office (Amt) of Ruswil was able to annex the western farms around Tannenfels. In 1678 Eustach von Sonnenberg acquired the lordship. In 1687 it passed to Johann Kaspar Mayr von Baldegg, who rebuilt the castle ruin. From 1752 to 1808 the castle and the lordship were owned by the Balthasar family. From 1818 to 1888 the castle was held by the Stockhausens, an Alsatian family of musicians, then by the Segesser von Brunegg family, and since 1955 it has been held by the Schnyder von Wartensee family. The castle was remodeled in the Baroque style in 1752 and extended with a tower in 1912.

== Bibliography ==
- Genealogisches Handbuch zur Schweizer Geschichte, vol. 2, pp. 29–32
- Die Kunstdenkmäler des Kantons Luzern, vol. 4, 1956, pp. 304–305
- F. Glauser, J. J. Siegrist, Die Luzerner Pfarreien und Landvogteien, 1977, pp. 60–61
- Helvetia Sacra IV/7, pp. 804–807
