= Georg Schneider (footballer, born 1892) =

German footballer

Personal information
- Full name: Georg Schneider
- Date of birth: 22 April 1892
- Place of birth: Munich, German Empire
- Date of death: 5 January 1961 (aged 68)
- Place of death: West Germany
- Positions: Defender; midfielder; centre-forward

Youth career
- FC Vulkan
- –1910: SC Teutonia-Union

Senior career*
Years	Team	Apps	(Gls)
1910–1925	Bayern Munich		

International career
1920–1921	Germany	3	(0)
- * Club domestic league appearances and goals

Georg Schneider (22 April 1892 – 5 January 1961), nicknamed Schorschl, was a German footballer who played as a defender, midfielder or centre-forward and made three appearances for the Germany national team.

== Club career ==
Schneider made his debut for Bayern Munich on 15 August 1910 in the Bavarian championship. He played for the team until 1925, and was named an honorary club captain.

== International career ==
Schneider made his international debut for Germany on 27 June 1920 in a friendly match against Switzerland, which finished as a 1–4 loss in Zürich. He earned three caps in total for Germany, making his final appearance on 5 June 1921 in a friendly against Hungary, which finished as a 0–3 loss in Budapest.

== Personal life ==
Schneider was born in Munich on 22 April 1892. He died on 5 January 1961 at the age of 68.

== Career statistics ==
=== International ===
Germany
Year	Apps	Goals
1920	2	0
1921	1	0
Total	3	0
