= Anthony Robin Schneider =

Austrian operatic bass

- Born: Oberpullendorf, Austria
- Education: University of Auckland; Academy of Vocal Arts
- Occupation: Operatic bass
- Organizations: Oper Frankfurt
- Website: www.anthonyrobinschneider.com

Anthony Robin Schneider is a freelance operatic bass from Austria and New Zealand, based in Germany. He has appeared in leading roles internationally, such as King Henry in Lohengrin at the Dutch National Opera, the title role in Handel‘s Hercules at Oper Frankfurt, Sarastro in Mozart's Die Zauberflöte at the Houston Grand Opera, and both Fafner and Hunding in Wagner's Ring Cycle at the Tiroler Festspiele in Erl.

== Career ==
Born in Oberpullendorf, Austria, Schneider studied at the University of Auckland and from 2013 at the Academy of Vocal Arts in Philadelphia. He was a member of the opera studio of the Houston Grand Opera in the 2017/18 season, and of the Santa Fe Opera. He appeared first at the Oper Frankfurt as the Innkeeper in Schreker's Der ferne Klang on 31 March 2019, directed by Damiano Michieletto who also made his house debut. The opera had been premiered in Frankfurt in 1912, and not been performed after World War II. A reviewer noted Schneider's convincing portrayal of the aggressive-lustful character. The production, with Sebastian Weigle conducting, was recorded in 2021. Schneider became a member of the ensemble in Frankfurt with the 2019/20 season. Roles at the house have included Bartolo in Mozart's Le nozze di Figaro, Heinrich in Wagner's Lohengrin, Ibn-Hakia in Tchaikovsky's Iolanta, Panas in Rimsky-Korsakov's Christmas Eve, Cirillo in Giordano's Fedora, and the title role in Handel‘s Hercules.

Schneider appeared as the Ghost of Hector in Les Troyens by Berlioz at the Vienna State Opera, Truffaldino in Ariadne auf Naxos by Richards Strauss at the Santa Fe Opera, and as Grenvil in Verdi's La Traviata and Sarastro in Mozart's Die Zauberflöte at the Houston Grand Opera. He has performed in Wagner's Der Ring des Nibelungen at the Tiroler Festspiele in Erl, as Fafner in Das Rheingold and Siegfried, and Hunding in Die Walküre.

Schneider recorded Beethoven's Ninth Symphony in 2019 with Sabina Cvilak, Kristin Darragh, Oliver Johnston, the Voices New Zealand Chamber Choir and the New Zealand Symphony Orchestra conducted by Edo de Waart. On 10 March 2022, during the 2022 Russian invasion of Ukraine, that recording was broadcast again by Radio New Zealand. The same day, he was the bass soloist in the symphony's final in a charity concert for Ukraine at the Alte Oper in Frankfurt, performed with Monika Buczkowska, Judita Nagyová and AJ Glueckert, members of Frankfurt choirs, and the hr-Sinfonieorchester conducted by Juraj Valčuha. It was broadcast by Hessischer Rundfunk.
