= Kurt Schneider (disambiguation) =

Kurt Schneider (1887–1967) was a German psychiatrist.

Kurt Schneider may also refer to:

- Kurt Schneider (athlete) (1900–1988), German athlete
- Kurt Schneider (aviator) (1888–1917), German World War I flying ace
- Kurt Schneider (cyclist) (1932–2023), Austrian cyclist
- Kurt Fritz Schneider (1902–1985), German circus performer in USA
- Kurt Hugo Schneider (born 1988), also known as KHS, American film director, producer, singer and songwriter

== See also ==
- Curt T. Schneider (born 1943), American politician in Kansas
