= William Schneider =

William or Bill Schneider may refer to:

- William Schneider (politician) (born 1959), former attorney general of Maine
- William Schneider Jr. (born 1941), chairman of the American Defense Science Board
- William C. Schneider (1923–1999), American aerospace engineer
- Creed Bratton (William Charles Schneider, born 1943), American actor
- William G. Schneider (1915–2013), Canadian chemist and research administrator
- William H. Schneider (1934–1994), United States Army general
- Bill Schneider (journalist) (born 1944), political commentator for CNN
- Bill Schneider (musician) (born 1971), bassist, guitar tech, and tour crew manager
- Buzz Schneider (born 1954), American ice hockey player, 1980 Olympic gold medalist
