= Nottwil =

- Municipality
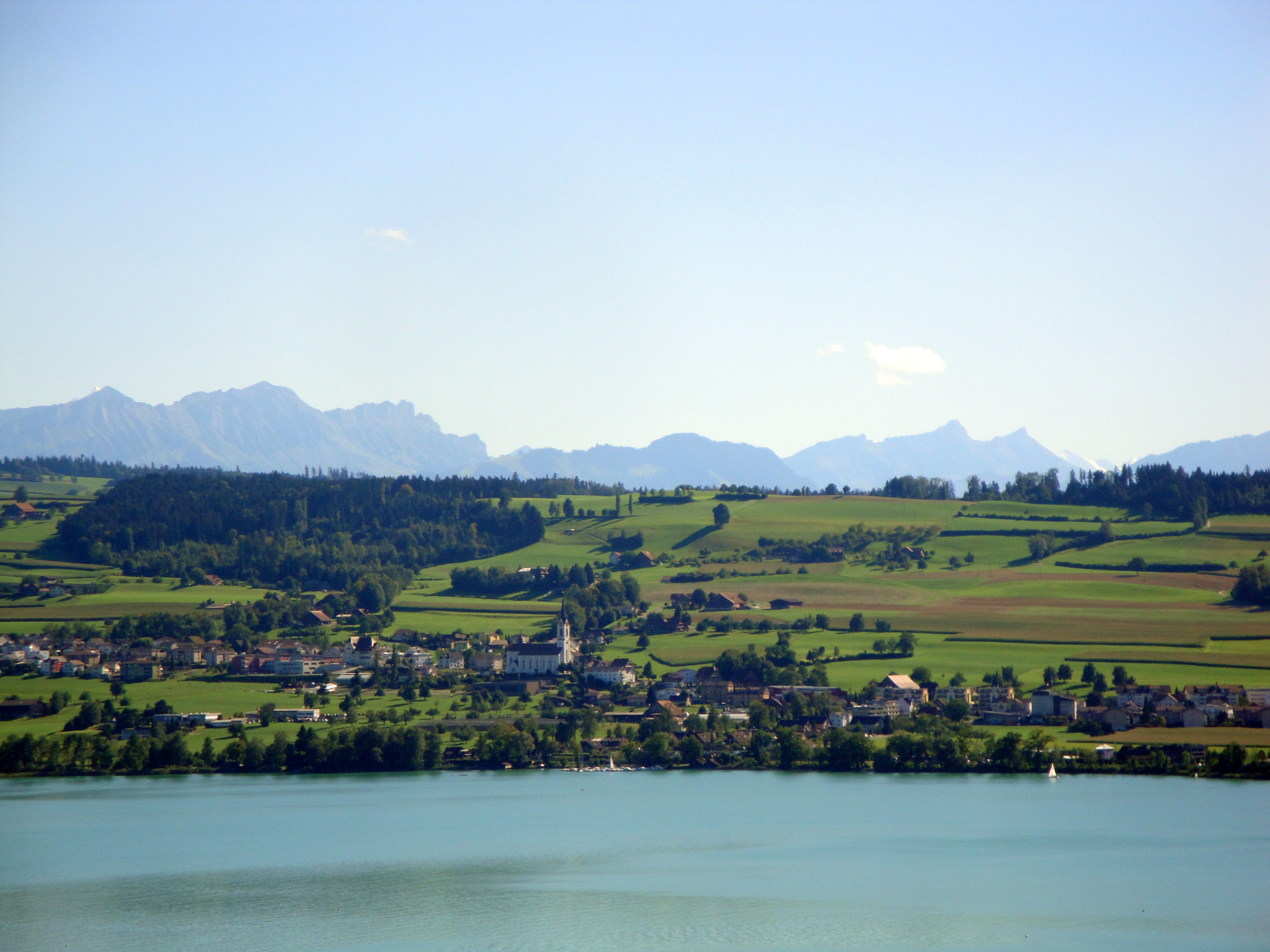

- Coat of arms
- Location of Nottwil
- Location within Switzerland Location within Canton of Lucerne
- Coordinates: 47°8′N 8°8′E
- Country: Switzerland
- Canton: Lucerne
- District: Sursee

Area
  - Total: 10.33 km^{2} (3.99 sq mi)
- Elevation: 526 m (1,726 ft)

Population (December 2020)
  - Total: 4,048
  - Density: 391.9/km^{2} (1,015/sq mi)
- Time zone: UTC+01:00 (CET)
  - Summer (DST): UTC+02:00 (CEST)
- Postal code: 6207
- SFOS number: 1094
- ISO 3166 code: CH-LU
- Surrounded by: Buttisholz, Eich, Neuenkirch, Oberkirch, Ruswil, Sempach
- Website: www.nottwil.ch

Nottwil is a municipality in the district of Sursee in the canton of Lucerne in Switzerland.

== History ==
Nottwil is first mentioned around 1217-22 as Nottewile. In 1275 it was mentioned as Otewile.

Nottwil is also the location where the cymbal manufacturer Paiste's factory and headquarters are located.

== Geography ==
Aerial view (1959)

Nottwil has an area of 10.3 km^{2} (4.0 sq mi). Of this area, 77.8% is used for agricultural purposes, while 8.9% is forested. Of the rest of the land, 12.6% is settled (buildings or roads) and the remainder (0.7%) is non-productive (rivers, glaciers or mountains). In the 1997 land survey, 8.91% of the total land area was forested. Of the agricultural land, 71.25% is used for farming or pastures, while 6.49% is used for orchards or vine crops. Of the settled areas, 8.33% is covered with buildings, 0.19% is industrial, 0.58% is classed as special developments, 0.77% is parks or greenbelts and 2.71% is transportation infrastructure. Of the unproductive areas, 0.19% is unproductive standing water (ponds or lakes), and 0.58% is other unproductive land.

The municipality is located on the southern shore of Lake Sempach (Sempachersee). It consists of the village of Nottwil and the scattered settlements of Eggerswil, Ei, Gattwil, Huprächtigen, Tann and Studen as well as Schloss Tannenfels.

== Demographics ==
Nottwil has a population (as of 31 December 2020) of 4,048. As of 2007, 9.9% of the population was made up of foreign nationals. Over the last 10 years the population has grown at a rate of 25.2%. Most of the population (as of 2000) speaks German (92.8%), with Italian being second most common (1.5%) and Albanian being third (1.3%).

In the 2007 election the most popular party was the CVP which received 31.8% of the vote. The next three most popular parties were the SVP (26.1%), the FDP (22.5%) and the SPS (9.3%).

The age distribution in Nottwil is; 818 people or 25.4% of the population is 0–19 years old. 994 people or 30.8% are 20–39 years old, and 1,103 people or 34.2% are 40–64 years old. The senior population distribution is 250 people or 7.8% are 65–79 years old, 52 or 1.6% are 80–89 years old and 7 people or 0.2% of the population are 90+ years old.

In Nottwil about 77% of the population (between age 25-64) have completed either non-mandatory upper secondary education or additional higher education (either university or a Fachhochschule).

As of 2000 there are 985 households, of which 279 households (or about 28.3%) contain only a single individual. 129 or about 13.1% are large households, with at least five members. As of 2000 there were 452 inhabited buildings in the municipality, of which 330 were built only as housing, and 122 were mixed use buildings. There were 222 single family homes, 39 double family homes, and 69 multi-family homes in the municipality. Most homes were either two (182) or three (103) story structures. There were only 16 single story buildings and 29 four or more story buildings.

Nottwil has an unemployment rate of 1.71%. As of 2005, there were 183 people employed in the primary economic sector and about 67 businesses involved in this sector. 223 people are employed in the secondary sector and there are 30 businesses in this sector. 1235 people are employed in the tertiary sector, with 70 businesses in this sector. As of 2000 57% of the population of the municipality were employed in some capacity. At the same time, females made up 42.9% of the workforce.

In the 2000 census the religious membership of Nottwil was; 2,049 (76.4%) were Roman Catholic, and 309 (11.5%) were Protestant, with an additional 36 (1.34%) that were of some other Christian faith. There are 1 individuals (0.04% of the population) who are Jewish. There are 55 individuals (2.05% of the population) who are Muslim. Of the rest; there were 6 (0.22%) individuals who belong to another religion (not listed), 149 (5.56%) who do not belong to any organized religion, 77 (2.87%) who did not answer the question.

The historical population is given in the following table:

Year	Population
c. 1695	c. 288
1850	1,212
1900	928
1950	1,185
2000	2,682

== Sports ==
The local handball club Spono Eagles has won the Swiss women's championship 5 times.
