= George Schneider (Medal of Honor) =

American military officer

Sergeant George Schneider
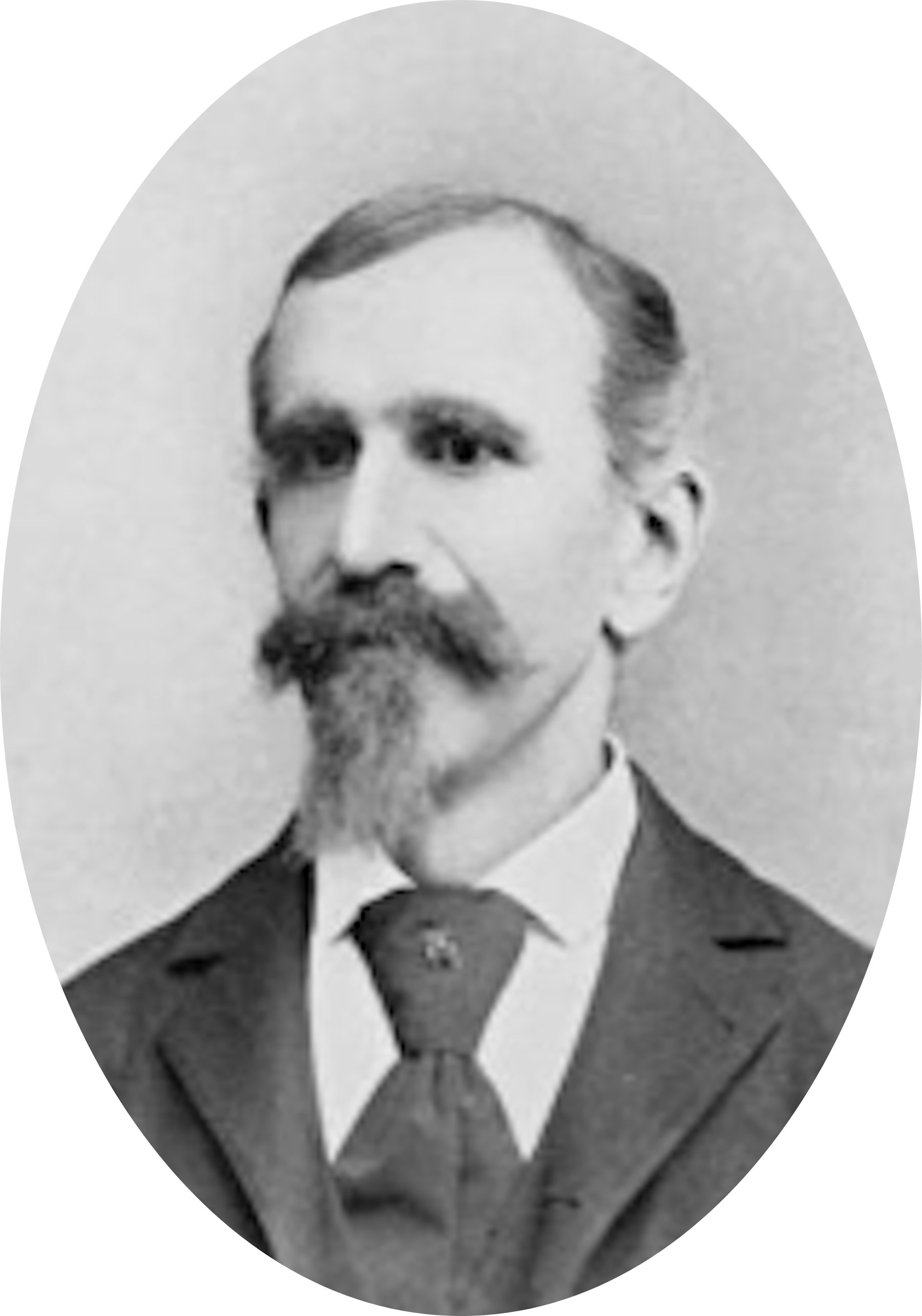
- Born: 7 November 1844; Baltimore, Maryland
- Died: 2 January 1929 (aged 84); Baltimore, Maryland
- Burial place: Baltimore Cemetery, Baltimore, Maryland
- Military career
- Allegiance: United States
- Branch: Army
- Service years: 1861-1865
- Rank: Sergeant
- Units: Company H, 3rd Maryland Infantry
- Conflicts: Battle of the Crater
- Awards: Medal of Honor

George Schneider (7 November 1844 - 2 January 1929) was a sergeant in the United States Army who was awarded the Presidential Medal of Honor for gallantry during the American Civil War. He was awarded the medal on 27 July 1896 for actions performed at the Battle of the Crater in Virginia on 30 July 1864.

== Personal life ==
Schneider was born in Baltimore, Maryland on 7 November 1844 to parents George W. Schneider and Christina Eidel Schneider. He was one of 5 children. He married Catherine F. Beck Schneider and fathered one child. He died in Baltimore on 2 January 1929 and was buried in Baltimore Cemetery in Baltimore.

== Military service ==
Schneider enlisted in the Army on 16 November 1861 as a private and was mustered into Company D of the 4th Maryland Infantry on the same day. However, his unit failed to recruit to full strength and was disbanded in May 1862. Schneider was transferred to Company H of the 3rd Maryland Infantry. He would eventually transfer to Company E of the same unit. At the Battle of the Crater near Petersburg, Virginia, he took the regimental colors from the color sergeant, who had been shot, and planted it on enemy fortifications during an infantry charge.

Schneider's Medal of Honor citation reads:

The President of the United States of America, in the name of Congress, takes pleasure in presenting the Medal of Honor to Sergeant George Schneider, United States Army, for extraordinary heroism in action at Petersburg, Virginia, on 30 July 1864. After the color sergeant had been shot down, Sergeant Schneider seized the colors and planted them on the enemy's works during the charge.

— D. S. Lamont, Secretary of War

Schneider was mustered out of the Army on 31 July 1865 at Arlington Heights, Virginia.
