= James Snyder =

James Snyder may refer to:

- James Snyder (actor) (born 1981), American actor and singer
- James Snyder (art historian) (1928–1990), American specialist in Northern Renaissance art, taught at Bryn Mawr
- James Snyder Jr. (1945–2021), American author, attorney and politician
- James L. Snyder (born 1951), American writer
- James S. Snyder (born 1952), American museum director and art historian
- Jim Snyder (coach) (1919–1994), American basketball coach
- Jim Snyder (journalist) (born 1965), American journalist
- Jim Snyder (second baseman) (1932–2021), American baseball player and coach
- Jim Snyder (shortstop) (1847–1922), American baseball player
- Jimmy Snyder (musician) (1934–2020), American musician
- Jimmy Snyder (racing driver) (1909–1939), American race car driver
- Jimmy Snyder (sports commentator) (1918–1996), also known as Jimmy the Greek, American sports commentator
- Dan Green (voice actor) (James Hadley Snyder, born 1971), American voice actor
