= Allen Snyder =

Allen, Allan, or Alan Snyder may refer to:

- Allen Snyder (coach), football, basketball, and baseball coach at Bowling Green State University
- Allen Snyder (lawyer) (born 1946), American lawyer and former nominee to the U.S. Court of Appeals for the District of Columbia Circuit
- Allan Snyder (born 1940), mind scientist
- Allan "Whitey" Snyder (1914–1994), American Hollywood make-up artist
- Alan Snyder (computer scientist); see Portable C Compiler
- Alan Snyder (Colony), fictional character in TV series, Colony

== See also ==
- Allen Snider, fictional character in Street Fighter
