= Schnieder =

Schnieder is a German occupational surname for a tailor. Notable people with this name include:

- Gordon Schnieder (born 1975), German politician of the Christian Democratic Union (CDU)
- Patrick Schnieder (born 1968), German lawyer and politician of the Christian Democratic Union (CDU)
