= Josef Schneider =

Josef Schneider may refer to:

- Josef Schneider Sr. (1840–1927), first producer of electricity in Germany
- Josef Schneider (footballer) (1901–?), Austrian football player and manager
- Josef Schneider (grenadier), Wehrmacht soldier
- Josef Schneider (rower) (1891–1966), Swiss rower
- Josef Schneider (skier) (born 1957), German Olympic skier
- Josef Schneider (soldier), Wehrmacht officer

== See also ==
- Joe Schneider (1926–2013), New Zealand rower
- Joseph Schneider, Australian architect
