= Georg Schneider (footballer, born 1959) =

German footballer

Personal information
- Full name: Georg Schneider
- Date of birth: 4 October 1959 (age 67)
- Place of birth: West Germany
- Height: 1.75 m (5 ft 9 in)
- Position: Midfielder

Senior career*
Years	Team	Apps	(Gls)
1978–1979	1860 Munich II		
1979–1981	Offenburger FV		
1981–1982	SC Freiburg	14	(0)
1982–1984	Offenburger FV		
- * Club domestic league appearances and goals

Georg Schneider (born 4 October 1959) is a German former footballer who played as a midfielder.

== Career ==
Schneider made his professional debut for SC Freiburg in the 2. Bundesliga on 13 February 1982, coming on as a substitute in the 58th minute for Adalbert Grzelak against Fortuna Köln. The home match at the Dreisamstadion in Freiburg im Breisgau finished as a 3–1 win. In total, Schneider made 14 appearances for Freiburg during the 1981–82 season.
