= Edward Schneider =

Edward Schneider or Eddie Schneider may refer to:

- Eddie August Schneider (1911–1940), American aviator
- Edward L. Schneider, professor of gerontology at USC
- Edward L. Schneider (died 1939), served under Chicago political boss Tom Pendergast
- Edward M. Schneider (1881–1946), Wisconsin State Assemblyman
