= Snyman =

Snyman is an Afrikaans surname. It may refer to:

- André Snyman (1974), South African rugby player
- Brendon Snyman (born 1984),South African rugby player
- Dana Snyman, South African journalist
- Eli Snyman (1996), Zimbabwe-born South African rugby union player
- Gerrie Snyman (born 1981), Namibian cricketer
- Harold Snyman (1928–1998), South African policeman
- Jacobus Philippus Snyman (1838–1925), Boer War Boer general
- Johan Snyman (born 1986), South African rugby player
- Neal Snyman (born 1971), South African recorder and producer
- Neil Snyman (born 1963), South African cricketer
- Philip Snyman (born 1987), South African rugby player
- Robin Roy Snyman (1934–2020), South African cleric
- Ruan Snyman (born 1987), South African rugby player
- Rudolph Gerhardus (RG) Snyman (1995), South African rugby union player
- "JP" Snyman du Plessis (born 1991), South African rugby player
- Jacques Snyman (born 1994), South African cricketer
