= Schneiter =

Schneiter is a surname. Notable people with the surname include:

- Andrés Schneiter (born 1976), Argentine tennis player
- Heinz Schneiter (1935–2017), Swiss footballer
- Jean-Louis Schneiter (1933–2016), French politician
- John Schneiter (1899–1976), Swiss bobsledder
- Pierre Schneiter (1905–1978), French politician
- Werner Schneiter (born 1946), Swiss long-distance runner
