= Vera Šnajder =

Bosnian mathematician

Vera Šnajder (née Popović, 1904–1976) was a Bosnian Serb mathematician known for being the first Bosnian to publish a mathematical research paper and the first female dean in Yugoslavia.

Šnajder was born on 2 February 1904, in Reljevo, one of the neighborhoods of Sarajevo; her father directed an Orthodox seminary. She began her university studies at the University of Belgrade in 1922, and graduated in 1928. She took a position as a schoolteacher at a girl's gymnasium in Sarajevo, and married Marcel Šnajder, a Jewish philosopher who at that time was working at the same school.

From 1929 to 1932 she traveled to Paris for advanced work in mathematics. It was during this time that she published her paper, the first mathematics paper written by a Bosnian. Entitled Sur l’extension de la méthode de Hele Shaw aux mouvements cycliques (The extension of Hele-Shaw's method to cyclic movements), the publication appeared in the journal Comptes rendus de l'Académie des Sciences in 1931, under the name V. Popovitch-Schneider, and concerned fluid dynamics.

After returning from Paris, Šnajder worked as a schoolteacher again. Her husband was killed by the Nazis in 1941. When the University of Sarajevo was founded in 1949, Šnajder became a faculty member. There, she first served as dean in 1951. She died on February 14, 1976, in Sarajevo.

The Vera Šnajder Award was launched in her honor by Bosnia & Herzegovina Futures Foundation. The award is given every year in the form of a travel grant to an outstanding student of natural/technical sciences in Bosnia and Herzegovina (undergraduate, master's or doctoral studies).
