= Georg Schneider (politician) =

German biologist and politician (1909–1970)

Georg Schneider (25 March 1909 – 10 June 1970) was a German biologist, KPD/SED functionary, and university lecturer in Jena.

== Life ==
Schneider was born in Saarbrücken to a working-class family; his father was a tailor. After attending Volksschule and an Aufbaugymnasium in Gotha, he studied biology and pedagogy at the University of Jena, where he also participated in labour sports (Arbeitersport) In 1929, he joined the Young Communist League of Germany (KJVD) and the following year joined the Communist Party of Germany (KPD). In 1931 he moved to the Soviet Union where he first worked as a teacher, then from 1936 on as a research associate of the developmental biologist Julius Schaxel (a fellow German expatriate), at the Academy of Sciences of the USSR. Starting in 1943, he instructed German prisoners of war at an anti-fascist school.

After the collapse of the Nazi regime, Schneider returned to Germany as a member of the "Ackermann Group" and became politically active in Saxony. After the Soviet Military Administration in Germany had assumed command in Thuringia, Schneider was appointed as a Thuringian KPD district leader by Walter Ulbricht. Among other things, his activities included the removal of the Social Democrat Hermann Brill from his post as president of the Regierungsbezirk. Owing to Schneider's organizational incompetence and doctrinaire behaviour, in the autumn of 1945 he was pushed out of government and steered towards the university system in Jena. In this capacity, he became head of the "Ernst Haeckel House" in 1947 and also pushed for the reintroduction of the Lebensreform magazine "Urania".

During his time in the Soviet Union, Schneider had become an advocate of the now-discredited scientific theories of Michurin and Lysenko. In 1951, his embrace of these theories popular with the Soviet leadership led him to a professorship at the University of Jena. In 1959, he lost this position and was sent to Moscow in the diplomatic service of the German Democratic Republic, from which he returned in 1962.

From 1950 to 1954, Schneider served as a deputy for the Socialist Unity Party (SED) in the Volkskammer of the GDR, then served from 1954 to 1958 on the district council (Bezirkstag) for the district of Gera, in which the city of Jena lay.

Schneider died in 1970 in a car accident in Jena.

== Publications ==
- Die Evolutionstheorie, das Grundproblem der modernen Biologie (The Theory of Evolution, the basic problem of modern biology), Deutscher Bauernverlag, Berlin 1950
