= Siegfried Schneider =

Siegfried Schneider may refer to:

- Siegfried Schneider (volleyball) (born 1939), German Olympic volleyball player
- Siegfried Schneider (politician) (born 1956), German politician
