= Peter Schneider =

Peter Schneider may refer to:

- Pete Schneider (1895–1957), American baseball player
- Peter Schneider (actor) (born 1975), German actor
- Peter Schneider (conductor) (born 1939), Austrian conductor and chorusmaster
- Peter Schneider (film executive) (born 1950), American film and theatrical producer and movie executive, founder of Orion Animation and former president of the Walt Disney Studios
- Peter Schneider (ice hockey) (born 1991), Austrian ice hockey player
- Peter Schneider (mathematician) (born 1953), German mathematician
- Peter Schneider (writer) (1940–2026), German writer
- Peter Schneider (Zen priest) (born 1937), Zen priest, founder of Beginner's Mind Zen Center, Northridge, California
