= Marilyn Schneider =

American physicist

Marilyn Beth Schneider (born 1952) is an American physicist specializing in inertial confinement fusion, including the design of instrumentation to study laser-initiated fusion and the design of hot hohlraums for nuclear weapons applications. She is a distinguished member of the technical staff at the Lawrence Livermore National Laboratory.

== Education and career ==
Schneider majored in physics at Barnard College, and continued her studies at Cornell University, where she completed a Ph.D. in 1983. Her dissertation was Defects, Diffusion and Fluctuations in Lyotropic Liquid Crystals.

After postdoctoral research at Cornell, she joined the Lawrence Livermore National Laboratory in 1986. Her work there has involved studying interface behavior and beam alignment in the Stanford Synchrotron Radiation Lightsource, Nova laser project, and National Ignition Facility, and leading the Radiative Properties Group at the laboratory.

== Recognition ==
Schneider was named as a Fellow of the American Physical Society (AMS) in 2013, after a nomination from the APS Topical Group on Instrument and Measurement Science, "for outstanding contributions to X-ray measurements in laser-produced plasmas". She became a distinguished member of the technical staff in 2019.
