= Jonathan Snyder =

Jonathan Snyder may refer to:

- Jonathan Snyder (musician) (born 1986), bassist with Meg & Dia
- Jonathan L. Snyder (1859–1918), president of Michigan's State Agricultural College
- Jonathan N. Snyder (born 1985), Businessman & Entrepreneur
