= Ksenia Schnaider =

Kyiv-based fashion label

KSENIASCHNAIDER
- Industry: Fashion
- Founded: 2011; 15 years ago
- Founders: Ksenia Schnaider, Anton Schnaider
- Headquarters: Kyiv, Ukraine
- Area served: Worldwide
- Products: Clothing, shoes, accessories, branding
- Website: www.kseniaschnaider.com

Ksenia Schnaider is a Kyiv-based fashion label led by Ksenia and Anton Schnaider. Established in 2011, the brand gained recognition in 2016 with the design of demi-denims, combination of culottes and skinny jeans.

== History ==
Ksenia Schnaider created her first pair of jeans from second-hand denim, which led to the designers continuing this as an ongoing project. The brand has three upcycled lines — denim, sport and knits, and denim fur technology.

Of 1000–2500 items made each season, around a third are upcycled. Each year the label upcycles 5.3 tonnes of denim jeans (up to 7000 pairs) to make about 5000 new garments. On average 550–700 jeans are upcycled each month.

=== Demi-denims ===
The duo's best known design is demi-denims, a combined silhouette of pants which appear to be made of two separate garments. Demi-denims look like slim-fit jeans from behind, and like a skirt or culottes worn on top of slim-fit jeans – from the front.

After its debut in 2016, it has gained success online and among celebrities, including Celine Dion and Bella Hadid.

== Collaborations ==
In March 2019, the brand announced the launch of a collaboration with denim producer ISKO The collection features the brand's signature demi-denims, flared jeans, denim shorts, skirts, and cropped jackets.

For spring-summer 2020, the brand collaborated with Belgium-based shoe label Morobé to produce mules and boots made from leftover denim.

In 2021, the brand created an 'anti-easy' capsule line for Isetan Tokyo out of leftover materials in its studio.

== Awards ==
In 2019, the label was placed in the Vogue Green Talent shortlist for upcycling an estimated 500 pairs of jeans, or five tonnes of textile and denim per year.
