= Charles W. Schneider House =

Historic house in Minnesota, United States

- U.S. National Register of Historic Places
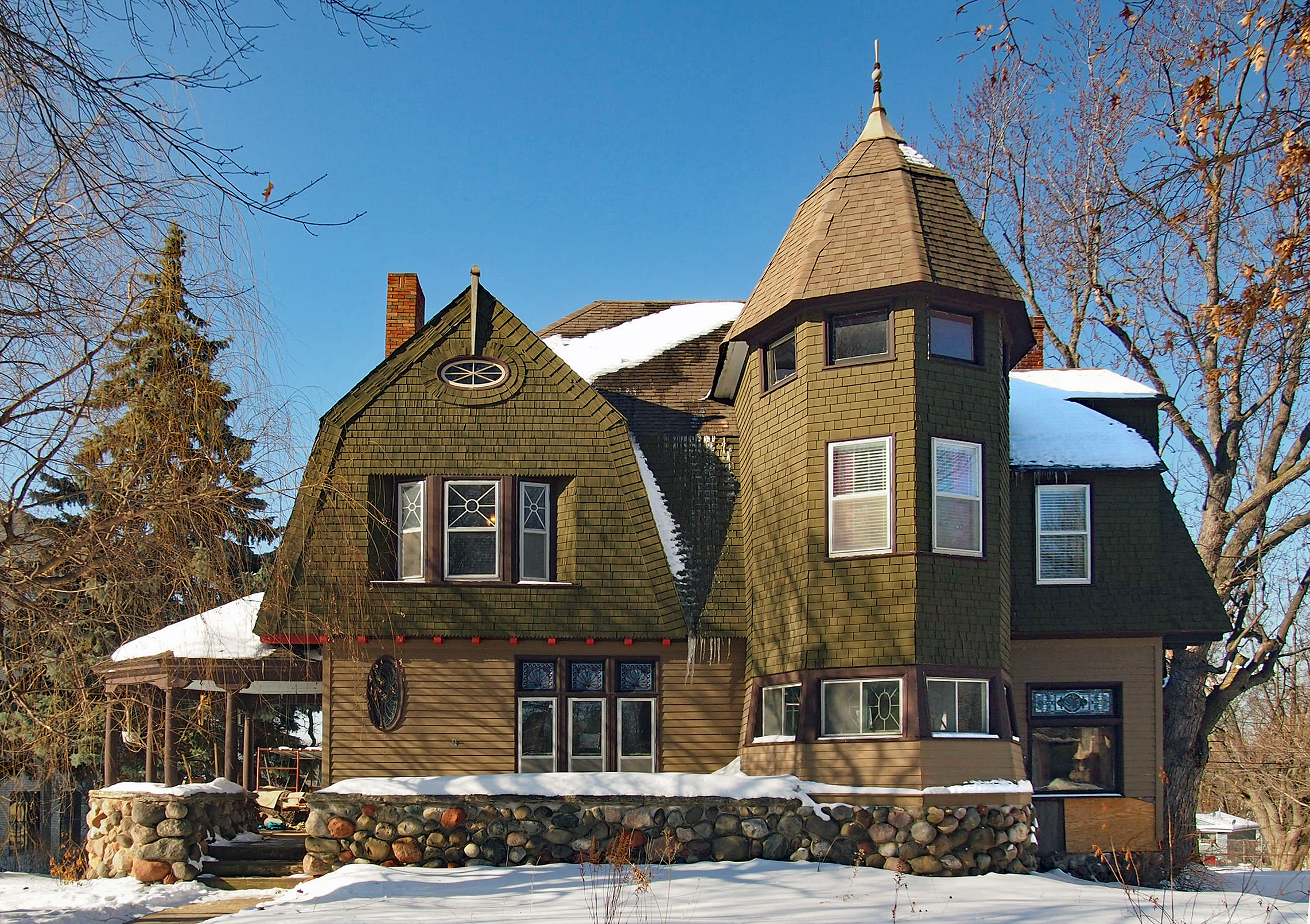
- The Charles W. Schneider House from the northeast

- Location within Minnesota Location within the United States
- Location: 1750 Ames Place East, Saint Paul, Minnesota
- Coordinates: 44°58′16″N 93°1′36″W
- Area: less than one acre
- Built: 1890
- Architect: Allen Stem
- Architectural style: East Coast Shingle Style
- NRHP reference No.: 84001677
- Added to NRHP: February 16, 1984

The Charles W. Schneider House is a historic house located at 1750 Ames Place East in Saint Paul, Minnesota, United States.

== Description and history ==
The home was built in 1890 in the Shingle Style that was popular during that time. It was listed on the National Register of Historic Places on February 16, 1984.

Architect- Allen Stem

Built by- Deeks and Whitbeck
