= Jost Schnyder von Wartensee =

Swiss officer and politician (1752–1824)

- Born: 7 August 1752; Lucerne, Old Swiss Confederacy
- Died: 28 December 1824 (aged 72); Lucerne, Switzerland
- Occupations: Officer; politician
- Spouse: Maria Emerentia Schnyder von Wartensee (m. 1784)
- Children: Franz Xaver Schnyder von Wartensee
- Parents: Franz Xaver Schnyder von Wartensee (father); Maria Barbara Keller (mother)
- Relatives: Joseph Xaver Schnyder von Wartensee (brother)

Jost Schnyder von Wartensee (7 August 1752 – 28 December 1824) was a Swiss officer and politician from Lucerne, a member of the Schnyder von Wartensee family. He was an officer in French service from 1769 to 1792, a Federalist during the Helvetic Republic, and a member of the Grand Council of Lucerne from 1803 to 1824. He was the father of the composer Franz Xaver Schnyder von Wartensee.

== Biography ==
Jost Schnyder von Wartensee was born on 7 August 1752 in Lucerne, the son of Franz Xaver Schnyder von Wartensee, a member of the Grand Council and state under-secretary (Staatsunterschreiber), and Maria Barbara Keller. His brother was Joseph Xaver Schnyder von Wartensee. In 1784 he married Maria Emerentia, née Schnyder von Wartensee. His son was the composer Franz Xaver Schnyder von Wartensee.

From 1761 to 1767 he attended the Jesuit college (Jesuitengymnasium) in Lucerne. From 1769 to 1792 he was an officer in French service, finally with the rank of captain. In 1798 he was commander in Ufhusen and chief quartermaster (Oberquartiermeister) in Lucerne, and from 1799 to 1803 he was war commissioner (Kriegskommissar). During the Helvetic Republic he was a Federalist and took part in two overthrows of the government.

From 1803 to 1824 Schnyder von Wartensee was a member of the Grand Council of Lucerne. He was a judge of the court of appeal (Appellationsrichter) from 1803 to 1812 and interim president of the police chamber (Polizeikammer) in 1808. From 1812 to 1814 he was a member of the Small Council (Kleiner Rat), where he sat on the military chamber (Militärkammer) and was inspector of roads (Strasseninspektor). He belonged to the wealthy urban upper class of Lucerne. He died in Lucerne on 28 December 1824.

== Bibliography ==
- R. Abplanalp, "zu einem ratsherrn gar nit erzogen", licentiate thesis, University of Zurich, 1990
- P. Bernet, Der Kanton Luzern zur Zeit der Helvetik, 1993
