= Édouard Schneider =

French author

- Born: 1880
- Died: 1960 (aged 79–80)
- Occupation: Author

Édouard Schneider (1880–1960) was a French author. He won three prizes from the Académie française: the Prix Montyon for Les Mages in 1912; the Prix Marcelin Guérin for Les heures bénédictines in 1926; and the Prix Brieux for L'Exaltation in 1928.

== Works ==
- Schneider, Édouard (1894). Une race oubliée : les Pélasges et leurs descendants. Paris: E. Leroux. OCLC 6976469.
- Schneider, Édouard (1907). Les raisons du coeur. Paris: E. Sansot. OCLC 715788700.
- Schneider, Édouard (1912). Les Mages. Paris: E. Sansot et Cie. OCLC 464990477.
- Schneider, Édouard (1919). Ariane, ma sœur. Paris: Albin Michel. OCLC 18299705.
- Schneider, Édouard (1921). Le dieu d'argile. Paris: Imprimerie de l'Illustration. OCLC 6978750.
- Schneider, Édouard (1925). Les heures bénédictines. Paris: Grasset. OCLC 11181251.
- Schneider, Édouard (1925). Eleonora Duse : souvenirs, notes et documents. Paris: Grasset. OCLC 901126378.
- Schneider, Edouard (1925). Jean Cras. Paris: M. Senart. OCLC 32769765.
- Schneider, Édouard (1926). Promenades d'Italie : l'esprit des visages et des sites. Paris: Grasset. OCLC 370711008.
- Schneider, Édouard (1926). Sur les traces de Saint-François : le petit pauvre au pays d'Assise. Paris: Grasset. OCLC 10496160.
- Schneider, Édouard (1928). L'Exaltation. Paris: La Petite Illustration. OCLC 459104309.
- Schneider, Édouard (1932). Le sacrifice du soir. Paris. OCLC 29142037.
- Schneider, Édouard (1933). Assise. Paris: Flammarion. OCLC 77351713.
- Schneider, Édouard (1933). Fra Angelico da Fiesole (1387-1455). Paris: Albin Michel. OCLC 3306778.
- Schneider, Édouard (1936). Dans Rome vivante. Paris: Librairie Plon. OCLC 490727834.
- Schneider, Édouard (1939). Une créature de Dieu. Paris: Librairie Plon. OCLC 35335089.
- Schneider, Edouard (1943). De ma tour florentine. Paris: Librairie Plon. OCLC 843406111.
- Schneider, Édouard (1952). Jeanne d'Arc et ses Lys : la légende et l'histoire. Paris: Grasset. OCLC 491081197.
- Schneider, Édouard (1957). Sainte Marguerite de Cortone. Paris: Aubier. OCLC 493244419.
- Schneider, Édouard (1958). Cellules et couvents Bénédictins. Paris: Pierre Amiot. OCLC 16115559.
