= Anthony Schneider =

Canadian ice hockey player (1933–1997)

Tony Schneider
- Born: May 17, 1933 Regina, Saskatchewan, Canada
- Died: January 14, 1997 (aged 63)
- Height: 5 ft 10 in (178 cm)
- Weight: 180 lb (82 kg; 12 st 12 lb)
- Position: Defense
- Shot: Left
- Played for: Buffalo Bisons; Springfield Indians; Quebec Aces; Victoria Cougars
- Playing career: 1948–1968

Anthony Schneider (May 17, 1933 – January 17, 1997) was a Canadian professional hockey player who played 261 games in the American Hockey League for the Buffalo Bisons and Springfield Indians. He also played in the Quebec Hockey League with the Quebec Aces and in the Western Hockey League with the Victoria Cougars. From 1965 to 1968, he coached the Calgary Spurs in the Western Canada Senior Hockey League. Schneider died on January 17, 1997, at the age of 63.
