= David Schneider =

David Schneider may refer to:

- Dave Schneider (politician) (born 1957), member of the Alberta Legislative Assembly
- Dave Schneider (musician) (born 1963), American musician
- David Schneider (actor) (born 1963), English actor and comedian
- David Schneider (writer), American film writer (Stark Raving Mad), director and actor
- David Schneider (tennis) (born 1955), former pro tennis player
- David Schneider (ice hockey) (born 1979), American professional ice hockey player
- David Schneider (orienteer) (born 1981), Swiss orienteer
- David J. Schneider, American psychologist
- David M. Schneider (1918–1995), American cultural anthropologist
- David T. Schneider (1922–2008), American diplomat
