= Snijders =

Snijders is a Dutch occupational surname. Snijder literally means "cutter", referring to a taylor or a woodcarver. People with this surname include:

- Ad Snijders (1929–2010), Dutch painter, collagist and a social activist
- Eddy Snijders (1923–1990), Surinamese composer, conductor and musician
- Frans Snijders (1579–1657), Flemish painter of animals and still life
- Genaro Snijders (born 1989), Dutch footballer
- Herman Snijders (1953–2021), Surinamese composer, conductor, and trombonist, nephew of Eddy
- Ivo Snijders (born 1980), Dutch rower
- Jan Snijders (born 1943), Dutch judoka, twin brother of Peter
- Joey Snijders (born 1987), Dutch footballer
- Lee Snijders, American designer, television host of "Design on a Dime"
- Mark Snijders (born 1972), Dutch footballer
- Peter Snijders (born 1943), Dutch judoka, twin brother of Jan
- Ronald Snijders (born 1949), Dutch-Surinamese jazz flutist and author, son of Eddy
- Tom Snijders (born 1949), Dutch statistician
- Wende Snijders (born 1978), Dutch singer
- Wouter Snijders (1928–2020), Dutch judge and legal scholar
