= Franz Xaver Schnyder von Wartensee =

Swiss composer and author (1786–1868)

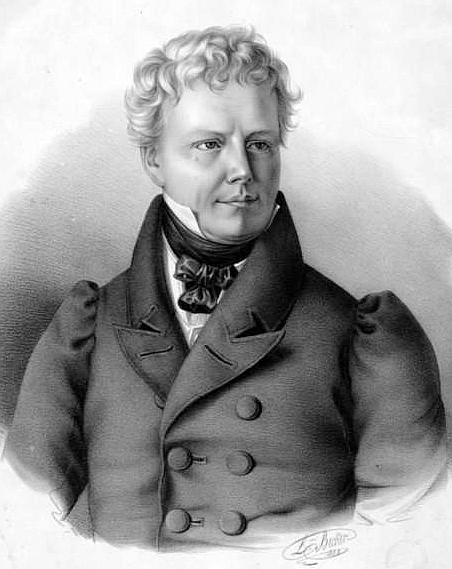
Franz Xaver Schnyder von Wartensee (1832)

Franz Xaver Schnyder von Wartensee (18 April 1786 – 27 August 1868) was a Swiss-born composer, teacher of composition and writer on music, resident in Frankfurt-am-Main for most of his career.

== Life ==
He was born in Lucerne; his father Jost Schnyder von Wartensee was an upper-class citizen of Lucerne, holding high offices including grand councillor.

Until 1810 he had no musical teaching but what he could get from books and practice. In that year he went to Zürich where he studied composition under Hans Georg Nägeli and Joseph Gersbach, and then to Vienna where he studied piano and composition under Johann Christoph Kienlen. He returned to Switzerland in 1812 and devoted himself to composition until 1815, when he became teacher in the Pestalozzi institute at Yverdun.

In 1817 he settled in Frankfurt-am-Main, and lived there as teacher of composition and director of various musical institutions until his death on 27 August 1868. (Note: Sources disagree: the Historical Dictionary of Switzerland gives 27 August 1868, while Grove's Dictionary of Music and Musicians gives 30 August 1868.) During this latter period he was highly regarded as a teacher, and had many pupils, among them the English composer Robert Lucas de Pearsall.

He married in 1814 Karoline von Hertenstein (died 1827), and in 1847 Josephine Jahn.

George Grove wrote: "Schnyder appears to have been a man of exceptional ability, but his life was too desultory to admit of his leaving anything of permanent value, and there was always a strong amateur element about him."

== Works ==
His compositions include the opera Fortunatus (1829) and the oratorio Zeit und Ewigkeit (1838)—both staged, with the opera also published—as well as symphonies performed in Frankfurt and various solo and choral songs. He was also a prolific writer in both poetry and prose, contributing many articles on musical subjects to Allgemeine musikalische Zeitung and Cæcilia.
