= Steve Schneider (American football) =

American football/softball coach and college athletics administrator

Current position
- Title: Defensive line coach
- Team: Nebraska Wesleyan
- Conference: ARC

Playing career

Football
- 1977–1979: Midland
- Position: Defensive lineman

Coaching career (HC unless noted)

Football
- 1980–1984: Midland (assistant)
- 1985–1987: Midland (LB)
- 1988–1991: Midland (DC)
- 1992–2001: Midland
- 2012–2019: Peru State
- 2023–present: Nebraska Wesleyan (DL)

Softball
- 1988–1992: Midland

Administrative career (AD unless noted)
- 1992–2007: Midland
- 2011–2018: Peru State

Head coaching record
- Overall: 86–103 (football)
- Tournaments: Football; 0–1 (NAIA D-II playoffs)

Steve Schneider is an American college football and softball coach and college athletics administrator. He is the defensive line coach for Nebraska Wesleyan University, a position he has held since 2023. He served as the head football coach at Midland Lutheran College—now known as Midland University—in Fremont, Nebraska from 1992 to 2001 and Peru State College in Peru, Nebraska from 2012 to 2019, compiling a career college football coaching record of 86–103. Schneider was the athletic director at Midland from 1992 to 2007 and Peru State from 2011 to 2018. At Midland, Schneider was also the head softball coach from 1988 to 1992. He retired from coaching in December 2019.

Schneider played college football as a defensive lineman at Midland and was captain of the 1979 team before graduating in 1980. He joined the coaching staff at Midland as a part-time assistant in 1980. He was named linebackers coach in 1985 and promoted to defensive coordinator in 1988.

== Head coaching record ==
=== Football ===
Year	Team	Overall	Conference	Standing	Bowl/playoffs	NAIA^{#}
Midland Warriors (Nebraska-Iowa Athletic Conference / Great Plains Athletic Conference) (1992–2001)
1992	Midland	2–8	1–5	6th		
1993	Midland	6–4	3–3	4th		
1994	Midland	8–3	5–1	2nd	L NAIA Division II First Round	
1995	Midland	6–4	3–3	T–3rd		
1996	Midland	5–5	4–2	T–2nd		
1997	Midland	2–8	2–4	T–5th		
1998	Midland	4–6	3–3	T–3rd		
1999	Midland	4–6	2–4	T–5th		
2000	Midland	5–5	4–4	T–6th		
2001	Midland	5–5	3–5	T–5th		
Midland:		47–54	30–34			
Peru State Bobcats (Heart of America Athletic Conference) (2012–2019)
2012	Peru State	5–6	3–6	7th		
2013	Peru State	7–4	5–4	T–4th		23
2014	Peru State	3–8	2–7	T–8th		
2015	Peru State	7–4	3–2	T–2nd (North)		
2016	Peru State	5–6	1–4	5th (North)		
2017	Peru State	7–4	3–2	T–3rd (North)		
2018	Peru State	3–8	1–4	T–5th (North)		
2019	Peru State	2–9	2–3	T–3rd (North)		
Peru State:		39–49	20–32			
Total:		86–103				
