= Paul Schneider (artist) =

German artist (1927–2021)

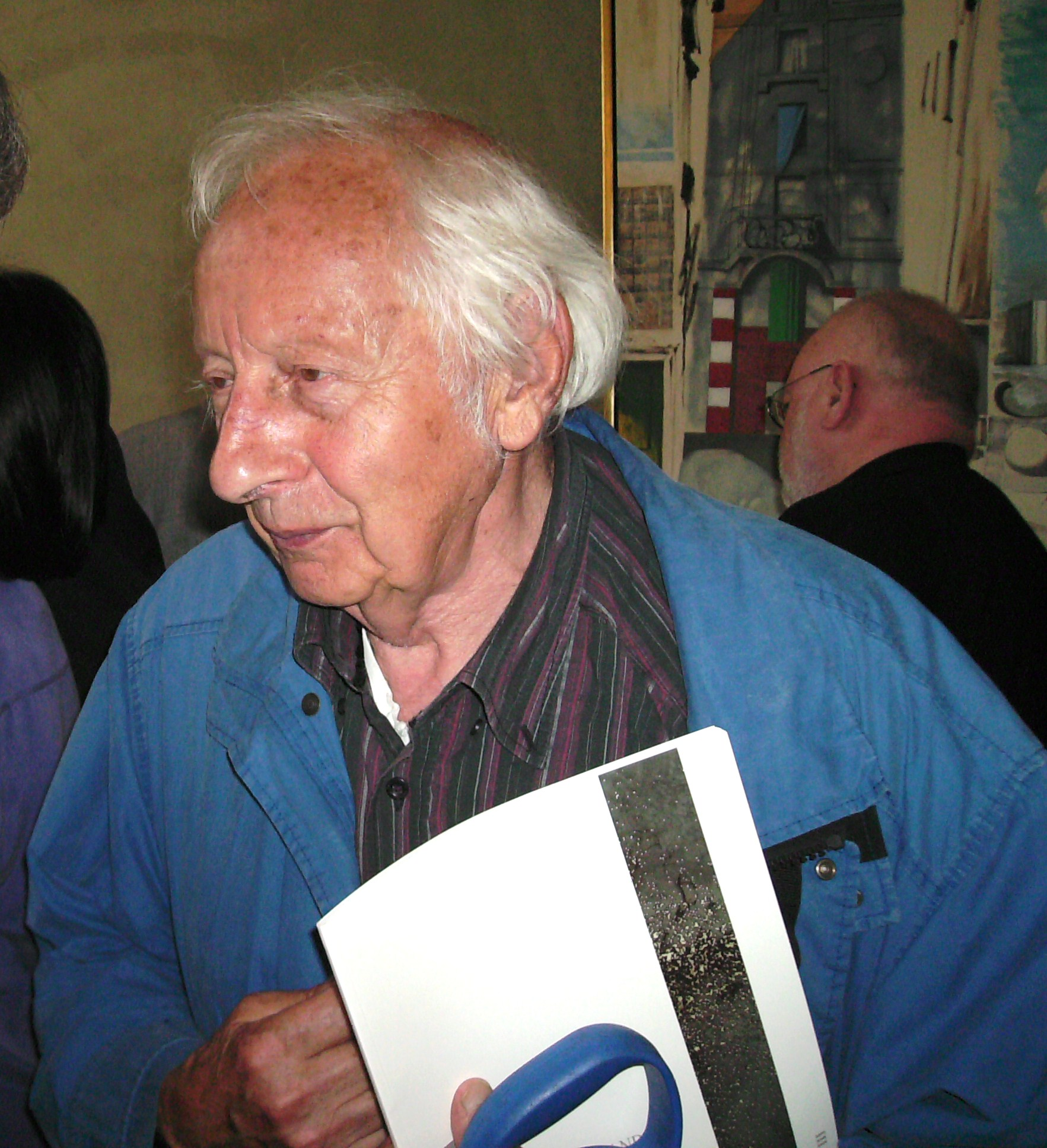
- Schneider in 2012
- Born: 5 May 1927; Saarbrücken, Territory of the Saar Basin
- Died: 16 April 2021 (aged 93)
- Occupation: Artist

Paul Schneider (5 May 1927 – 16 April 2021) was a German artist and sculptor. He participated in the French-German artistic project Les Menhirs de l'Europe, primarily in Launstroff and Moselle.

== Gallery ==
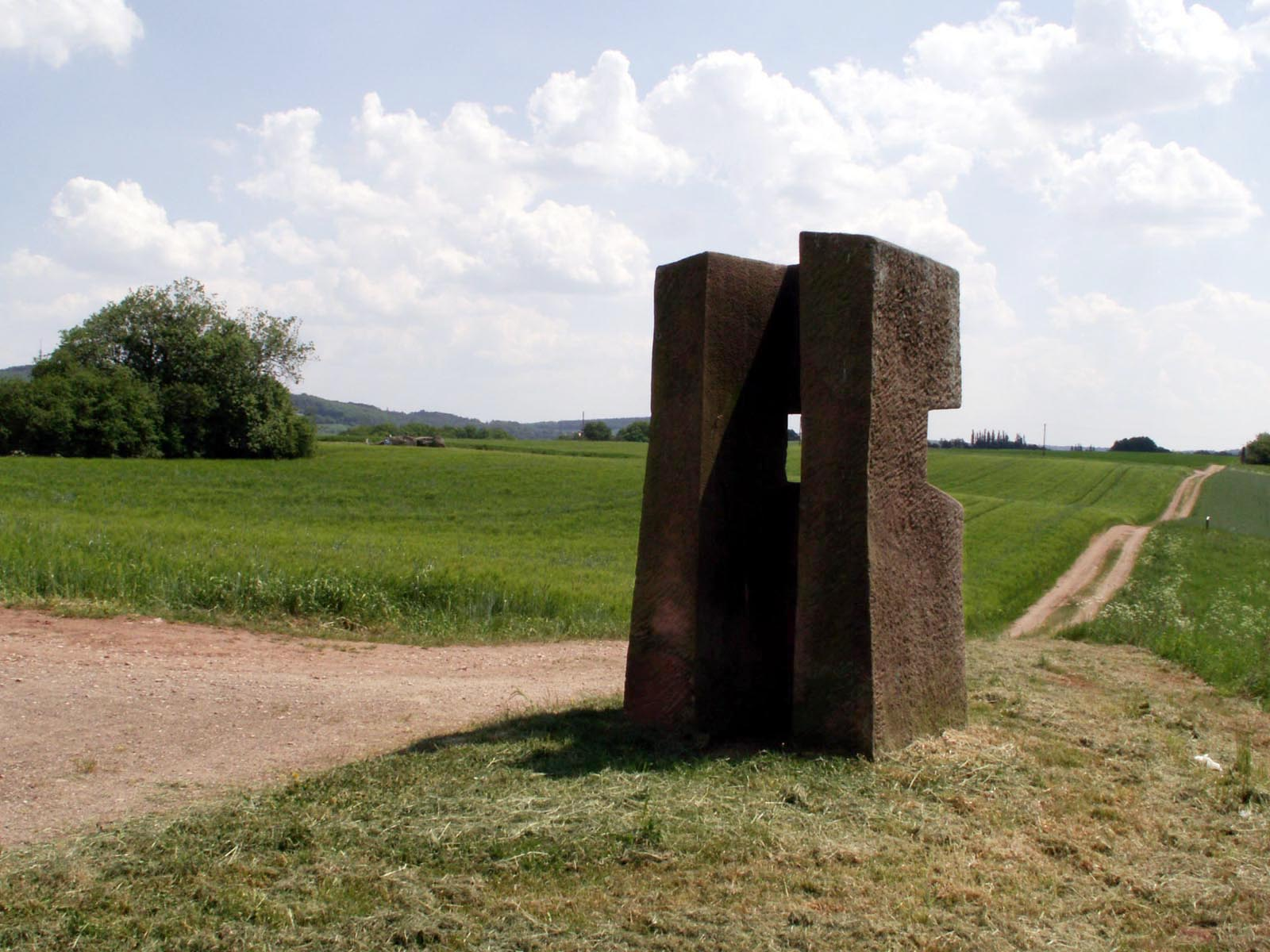
Durchblick in die Landschaft, 1972, Strasse der Skulpturen St. Wendel

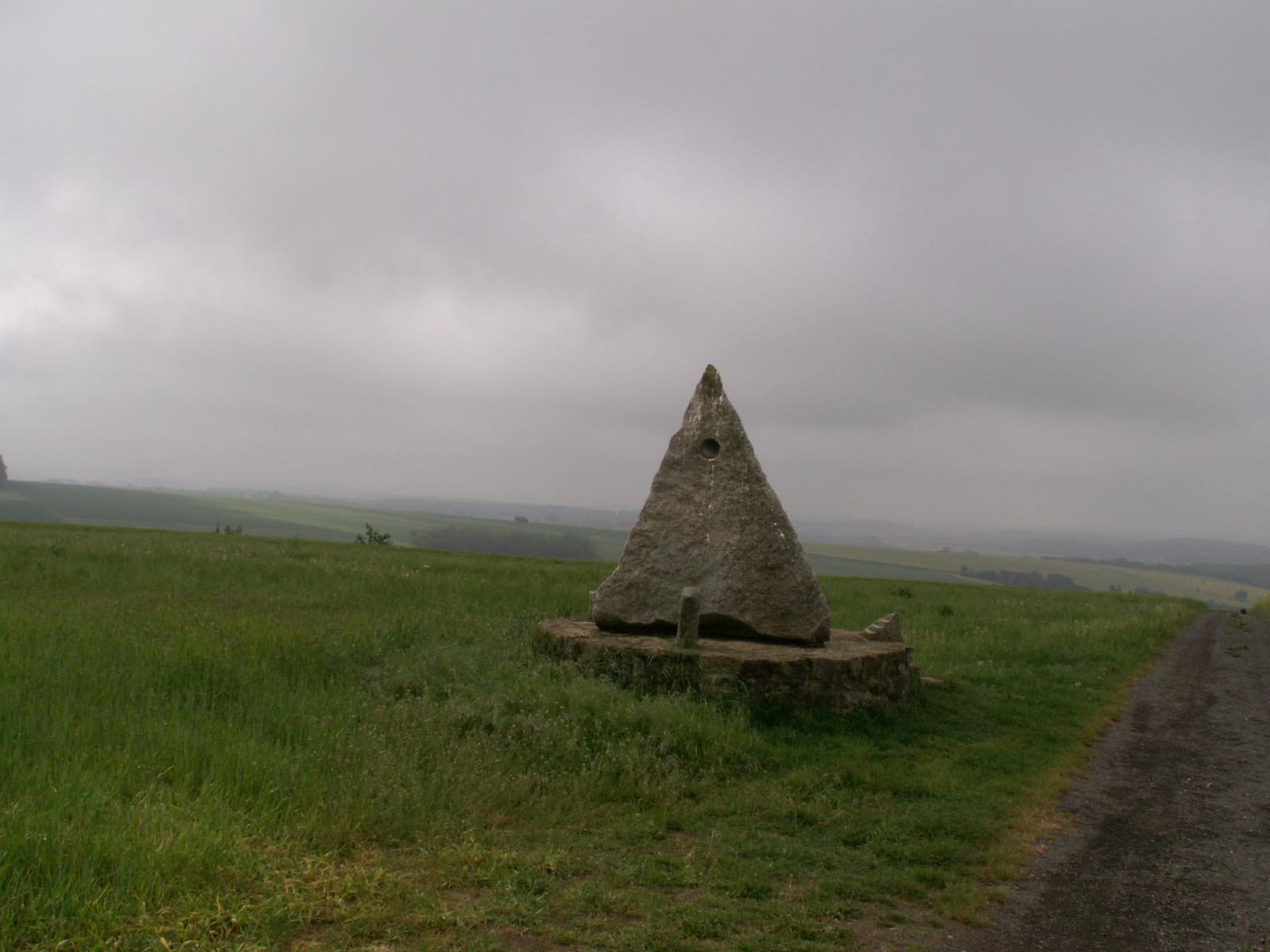
Steine an der Grenze, 1987, Merzig
