= Schnider =

Schnider is a surname. Notable people with the surname include:

- Andreas Schnider (born 1959), Austrian theologian, academic teacher, author, publisher, consultant and politician of the (ÖVP)
- Anton Schnider, Swiss international footballer
- Daniel Schnider, Swiss former professional road cyclist
- Jan Schnider (born 1983), Swiss beach volleyball player
- Marina Schnider, Swiss sport shooter
- Pascale Schnider (born 1984), Swiss cyclist
- Gert Schnider, Austrian board game player
- Ueli Schnider, Swiss cross-country skier

== See also ==
- Schnider Hérard, Haitian basketball player
