= John Brand Schneider =

John Brand Schneider is an American electrical engineer, and an associate professor of electrical engineering at Washington State University.

Schneider graduated from Tulane University in 1983, and earned a Ph.D. from the University of Washington in 1991. After a visiting position at Washington State University, he obtained a regular-rank faculty position there in 1993. He was named Fellow of the Institute of Electrical and Electronics Engineers (IEEE) in 2013, "for contributions to the finite-difference time-domain method in computational electromagnetics".

He is married to fellow Washington State electrical engineer Shira Broschat; they have two children, Miya and Henry Schneider.
