= Sneijder =

Sneijder is a surname. Notable people with the surname include:

- Jeffrey Sneijder (born 1982), Dutch footballer
- Rodney Sneijder (born 1991), Dutch footballer
- Wesley Sneijder (born 1984), Dutch footballer

== See also ==
- The New Life of Paul Sneijder, 2016 drama film
