= Grand Council (Switzerland) =

Legislative body in Swiss cities and cantons from the 14th century to present

The Grand Council (German: Grosser Rat; French: Grand Conseil; Italian: Gran Consiglio) was the enlarged legislative body in the cities of the Old Swiss Confederation between the 14th and early 16th centuries, and later served as one of two chambers of the Helvetic Republic parliament from 1798 to 1800. In the confederation cities, the Grand Council emerged as the bourgeoisie gained increasing political weight against the city lords and ruling nobility, forcing the authorities to secure broader support for important decisions.

Today, several Swiss cantons continue to use the term "Grand Council" for their cantonal legislatures, maintaining a direct institutional connection to these historical bodies.

== Old Swiss Confederation ==
=== Origins and development ===
The Grand Council appeared in confederation cities between the 14th century and the beginning of the 16th century as part of the broader evolution of urban councils. During this period, the bourgeoisie acquired increasing political influence in opposition to the seigneur of the city and the ruling class composed primarily of nobility. This shift in the balance of power compelled the existing authorities to seek broader support for their governance, leading to the institutional expansion of the governing bodies.

To legitimize important decisions, the Small Council, which managed day-to-day affairs, was enlarged into an institution bringing together 60 to 200 burghers, most of whom were leaders of guilds and corporations. This enlarged body became known as the Grand Council, which, as the sovereign council (Rät und Burger), represented the urban community externally and embodied supreme power within the city.

=== Structure and functions ===
The Grand Council always met in conjunction with the Small Council, generally upon convocation by the latter. While its essential role varied little from city to city, there were significant differences in composition, election methods, specific competencies, and frequency of sessions. The council's fundamental responsibilities included deciding matters of war and peace, approving treaties, appointing certain magistrates, and voting on fiscal and monetary matters.

The size of the Grand Council varied considerably among different cities. Including the Small Council members, the total numbered 100 in Lucerne, 101 in Solothurn, 86 in Schaffhausen, 90 in St. Gallen, and between 200 and 300 members (hence the name Council of Two Hundred) in Zurich, Bern, Fribourg, Basel, and Geneva. The Basel Grand Council was reinforced following the crisis of 1691, not only in its membership but also in its status as the "supreme authority".

=== Regional variations ===
Geneva maintained a unique system where the assembly of burghers continued under the name of Conseil général (General Council) until the beginning of the modern era. Only in 1526 was a Council of Two Hundred created to align with the practices of allied confederation cities. Lausanne had created its own Grand Council in 1517, against the will of the bishop, and it survived after 1536, though as that of a subject city rather than a sovereign one.

The rural cantons also developed enlarged councils during the late Middle Ages. To address important affairs, each member of the narrow council would add one or two counselors to form the Double Council (Zweifacher Rat, Double Conseil) or Triple Council (Dreifacher Rat, Triple Conseil). Seats were not allocated by the Landsgemeinde but by local communities serving as electoral districts (neighborhoods, Rhodes, Ürten of Nidwalden, etc.). The two Appenzells developed a three-tier system during the modern era, consisting of the Double Council, Grand Council, and Small Council.

=== Evolution toward oligarchy ===
Although the Grand Councils were fairly representative of the entire bourgeoisie during the late Middle Ages, they all evolved during the modern era in the direction of oligarchization, concentrating power among increasingly narrow elite groups.

== Helvetic Republic ==
Between 1798 and 1800, the Grand Council served as one of two chambers of the Parliament of the Helvetic Republic. The Grand Council was responsible for drafting laws or initiating legislation, which were then either adopted as presented or rejected by the Senate, which constituted the second chamber. Conversely, the Grand Council ruled on constitutional modifications proposed by the Senate.

=== Composition and election ===
Seats were intended to be distributed proportionally to the population of the eighteen administrative districts, but the first Grand Council, which was constituted on April 12, 1798, was composed of eight deputies per canton, totaling 144 members, though not all exercised their mandate. Representatives of the people, who had to be at least 25 years old and active citizens, were elected for six years by indirect suffrage and could stand for re-election after a two-year interval.

Every even year, one-third of the councilors were eliminated by lottery, though this occurred only once (August 1, 1800). Members of the Grand Council wore official costumes and enjoyed parliamentary immunity. The presidency changed every fourteen days, and a constitutional provision prohibited the creation of permanent committees. The Chamber, whose deliberations were public, was required to suspend its activities for at least three months per year.

=== Dissolution ===
On August 7, 1800, the Grand Council approved its own dissolution at the request of the Executive Commission, marking the end of this particular institutional arrangement in Swiss federal governance.

== Modern legacy ==
The institutional concept of the Grand Council has persisted in modern Switzerland, where several cantons continue to use this designation for their cantonal legislatures. This represents a direct institutional continuity with the historical Grand Councils of the confederation period, though adapted to contemporary democratic governance structures and federalism.

== Bibliography ==
- HbSG, 1, 548–557
- P. Blickle, «Friede und Verfassung», in Innerschweiz und frühe Eidgenossenschaft, 1, 1990, 93–134
- ASHR, 1, 574–578, 585; 2, 1211
- E. His, Geschichte des neuern Schweizerischen Staatsrechts, 1, 1920, 228–234
- A. Kölz, Neuere schweizerische Verfassungsgeschichte, 1992, 114–116
