= Sursee =

- Municipality
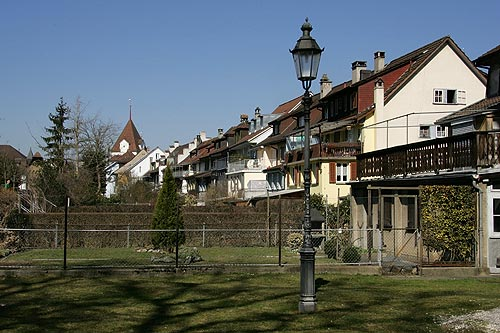

- Coat of arms
- Location of Sursee
- Location within Switzerland Location within Canton of Lucerne
- Coordinates: 47°10′N 8°7′E
- Country: Switzerland
- Canton: Lucerne
- District: Sursee

Area
  - Total: 6.06 km^{2} (2.34 sq mi)
- Elevation: 504 m (1,654 ft)

Population (December 2020)
  - Total: 10,361
  - Density: 1,710/km^{2} (4,430/sq mi)
- Time zone: UTC+01:00 (CET)
  - Summer (DST): UTC+02:00 (CEST)
- Postal code: 6210
- SFOS number: 1103
- ISO 3166 code: CH-LU
- Surrounded by: Geuensee, Knutwil, Mauensee, Oberkirch, Schenkon
- Twin towns: Highland (United States), Martigny (Switzerland)
- Website: www.sursee.ch

Sursee (High Alemannic: Soorsi) is a municipality in the district of Sursee in the canton of Lucerne, Switzerland. Sursee is located at the northern end of Lake Sempach, not far from where the Sure (or Suhre) stream exits the lake ("See"), hence the name "Sursee".

== History ==
The shores of Lake Sempach have been inhabited since the Neolithic. Sursee municipality is home to the Halbinsel prehistoric pile-dwelling (or stilt house) settlement that is part of the Prehistoric Pile dwellings around the Alps UNESCO World Heritage Site. Halbinsel was settled a number of times during the Neolithic and Bronze Age. At Zellmoos in the Halbinsel site, the bottom layer is from the Cortaillod culture while there are several Late Bronze Age layers above it. There are three Late Bronze Age layers at Gammainseli. The Zellmoos sites were discovered in 1806 and excavated in 1902, 1941, 1991 and 2005. The Bronze Age sites featured several houses with clay floors. A number of ceramic, bronze, bone, stone and flint items were found in the excavation. The Gammainseli site has been known since the 19th century, and was explored by divers in 2005, who found Late Bronze Age potsherds, animal bones and a few bronze items. Some neolithic flints were also found, but no trace of a settlement has been discovered.

In the Roman era, there was a vicus just to the west of the town. In the 8th century, a wooden church was built around which the village gradually developed. The wooden church was replaced by stonework in c. 800, again rebuilt in c. 1000. An Alamannic cemetery and the remains of another early medieval church were excavated to the north-east of the town.

The first mention as Surse dates to 1036, as Ulrich I of Lenzburg gave the village to Beromünster abbey. The village grew into a small town in the 13th century, granted city rights by the Dukes of Austria in 1299. Sursee was conquered by Lucerne in 1415, and managed to retain its city rights under the new lordship.

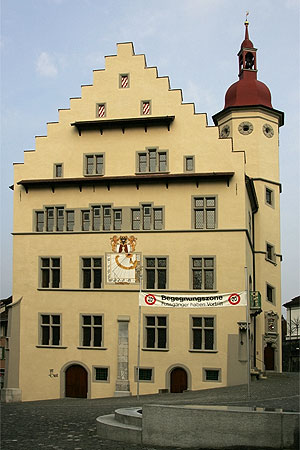
Sursee, Rathaus (Town Council Building) and Markthaus (Market place)

In the later 19th century, the furnace-factory Ofenfabrik Sursee grew to be the largest employer. By 1950, Sursee was affected by uncontrolled growth and today faces the problems of many agglomeration cities. But during the 1990s, authorities tried to guide the growth in a more controlled, higher quality direction. In 2003, the Wakker Prize was awarded to Sursee for the development and preservation of its architectural heritage. Sursee was awarded the prize for their efforts to control and direct the formerly uncontrolled expansion while avoiding turning the historic old city into a museum or an empty show piece.

== Geography ==
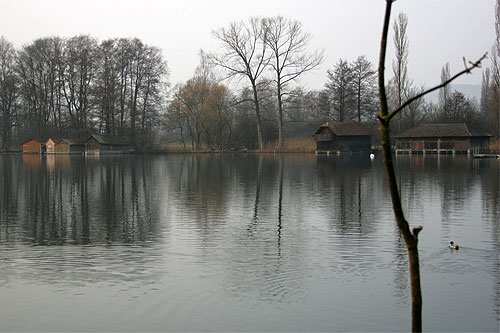
Lake Sempach

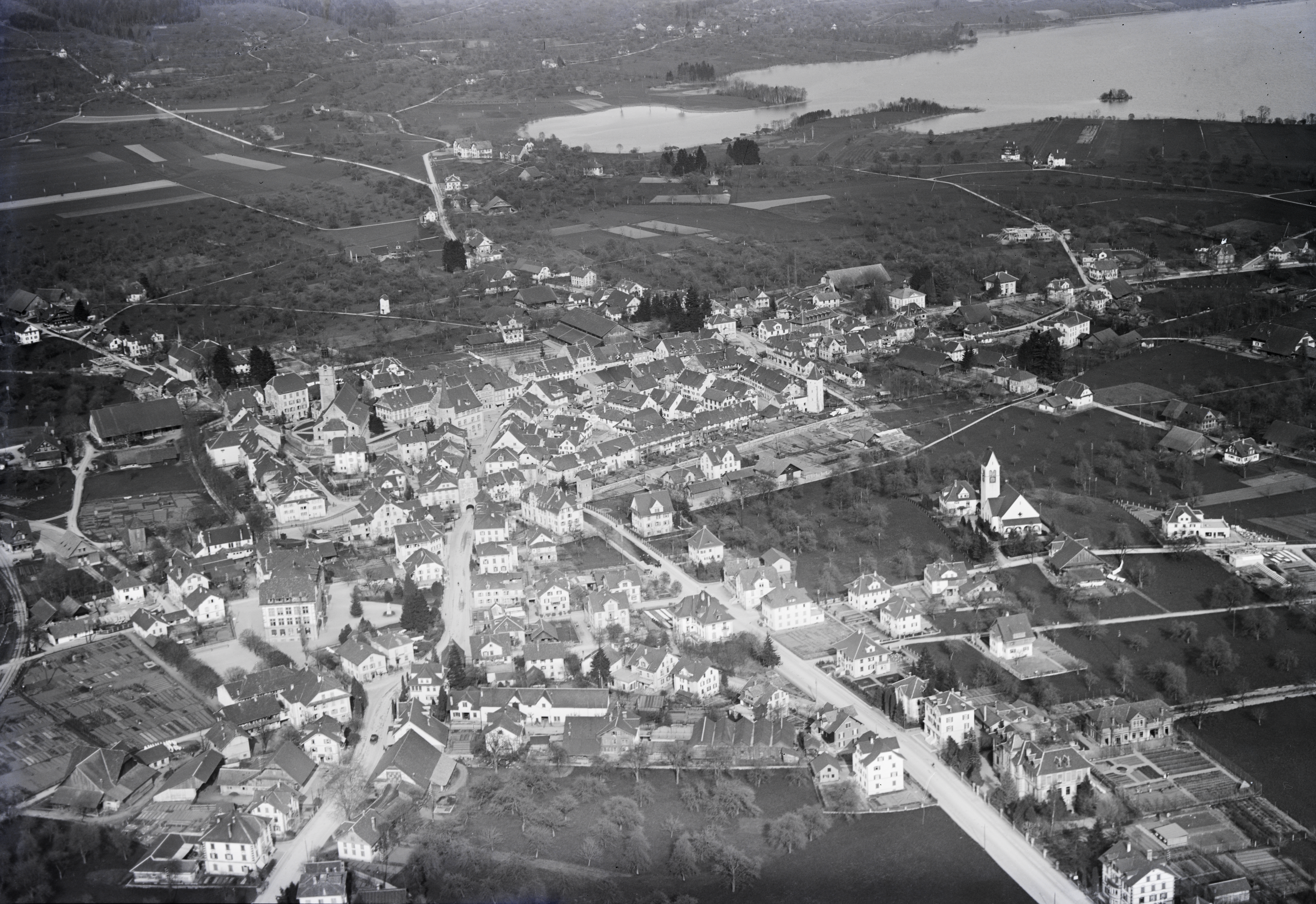
Aerial view from 250 m by Walter Mittelholzer (1929)

Sursee has an area of 5.9 km^{2} (2.3 sq mi). Of this area, 30.7% is used for agricultural purposes, while 21.8% is forested. Of the rest of the land, 46.8% is settled (buildings or roads) and the remainder (0.7%) is non-productive (rivers, glaciers or mountains). In the 1997 land survey, 21.88% of the total land area was forested. Of the agricultural land, 28.72% is used for farming or pastures, while 2.05% is used for orchards or vine crops. Of the settled areas, 17.95% is covered with buildings, 9.23% is industrial, 0.51% is classed as special developments, 3.76% is parks or greenbelts and 15.21% is transportation infrastructure.

== Demographics ==
Sursee has a population (as of 31 December 2020) of 10,361. As of 2007, 16.9% of the population was made up of foreign nationals. Over the last 10 years the population has grown at a rate of 6.7%. Most of the population (as of 2000) speaks German (86.9%), with Albanian being second most common ( 2.8%) and Serbo-Croatian being third ( 2.8%).

In the 2007 election the most popular party was the CVP which received 30.8% of the vote. The next three most popular parties were the FDP (23.9%), the SVP (19.7%) and the SPS (12.4%).

The age distribution in Sursee is; 1,753 people or 20.2% of the population is 0–19 years old. 2,712 people or 31.2% are 20–39 years old, and 2,862 people or 32.9% are 40–64 years old. The senior population distribution is 1,014 people or 11.7% are 65–79 years old, 304 or 3.5% are 80–89 years old and 43 people or 0.5% of the population are 90+ years old.

In Sursee about 68.3% of the population (between age 25–64) have completed either non-mandatory upper secondary education or additional higher education (either university or a Fachhochschule).

As of 2000 there are 3,288 households, of which 1,135 households (or about 34.5%) contain only a single individual. 267 or about 8.1% are large households, with at least five members. As of 2000 there were 1,063 inhabited buildings in the municipality, of which 788 were built only as housing, and 275 were mixed use buildings. There were 418 single family homes, 120 double family homes, and 250 multi-family homes in the municipality. Most homes were either two (317) or three (288) story structures. There were only 33 single story buildings and 150 four or more story buildings.

Sursee has an unemployment rate of 2.37%. As of 2005, there were 104 people employed in the primary economic sector and about 10 businesses involved in this sector. 1990 people are employed in the secondary sector and there are 110 businesses in this sector. 7404 people are employed in the tertiary sector, with 534 businesses in this sector. As of 2000 55.5% of the population of the municipality were employed in some capacity. At the same time, females made up 46.4% of the workforce.

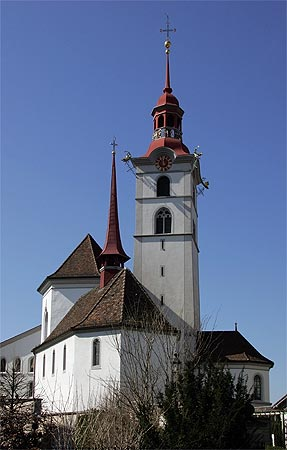
Roman Catholic Church of St. George in Sursee

In the 2000 census the religious membership of Sursee was; 6,004 (74.5%) were Roman Catholic, and 791 (9.8%) were Protestant, with an additional 269 (3.34%) that were of some other Christian faith. There are 2 individuals (0.02% of the population) who are Jewish. There are 381 individuals (4.73% of the population) who are Muslim. Of the rest; there were 89 (1.1%) individuals who belong to another religion (not listed), 299 (3.71%) who do not belong to any organized religion, 224 (2.78%) who did not answer the question.

== Sister cities ==
Sursee is twinned with:

Highland, Illinois, United States	(Switzerland) Martigny, Valais

== Notable residents ==
- Hans Küng (1928–2021), Swiss Catholic priest and theologian
- Haris Seferovic (b. 1992), Swiss footballer
- Rolf Ineichen (b. 1978), Swiss racing driver
