= Polk Township, Missouri =

Polk Township, Missouri may refer to one of the following places:

- Polk Township, Adair County, Missouri
- Polk Township, Atchison County, Missouri
- Polk Township, Cass County, Missouri
- Polk Township, Dade County, Missouri
- Polk Township, DeKalb County, Missouri
- Polk Township, Madison County, Missouri
- Polk Township, Nodaway County, Missouri
- Polk Township, Ray County, Missouri
- Polk Township, St. Clair County, Missouri
- Polk Township, Sullivan County, Missouri
- and also:
  - East Polk Township, Christian County, Missouri
  - West Polk Township, Christian County, Missouri

See also

- Polk Township (disambiguation)
