= Polk Township =

Polk Township may refer to:

== Arkansas ==
- Polk Township, Newton County, Arkansas, in Newton County, Arkansas

== Illinois ==
- Polk Township, Macoupin County, Illinois

== Indiana ==
- Polk Township, Huntington County, Indiana
- Polk Township, Marshall County, Indiana
- Polk Township, Monroe County, Indiana
- Polk Township, Washington County, Indiana

== Iowa ==
- Polk Township, Benton County, Iowa
- Polk Township, Bremer County, Iowa
- Polk Township, Jefferson County, Iowa
- Polk Township, Shelby County, Iowa
- Polk Township, Taylor County, Iowa
- Polk Township, Wapello County, Iowa

== Minnesota ==
- Polk Centre Township, Pennington County, Minnesota

== Missouri ==
- Polk Township, Adair County, Missouri
- Polk Township, Atchison County, Missouri
- Polk Township, Cass County, Missouri
- Polk Township, Dade County, Missouri
- Polk Township, DeKalb County, Missouri
- Polk Township, Madison County, Missouri
- Polk Township, Nodaway County, Missouri
- Polk Township, Ray County, Missouri
- Polk Township, St. Clair County, Missouri
- Polk Township, Sullivan County, Missouri

== Ohio ==
- Polk Township, Crawford County, Ohio

== Pennsylvania ==
- Polk Township, Jefferson County, Pennsylvania
- Polk Township, Monroe County, Pennsylvania
