= Muddy Creek (Grand River tributary Livingston County, Missouri) =

Stream in the U.S. state of Missouri

Muddy Creek is a stream in Sullivan, Linn, Grundy and Livingston counties of west central Missouri. It is a tributary of the Grand River.

The stream headwaters arise in Sullivan County approximately 2.5 miles east of Osgood at 40°11′34″N 93°17′38″W and an elevation of approximately 940 feet. The stream flow south-southwest passing under Missouri routes 6 and 139 east and south of Humphreys. It passes through the northwest corner of Linn County five miles east of Laredo and the southeast corner of Grundy County. It continues south-southeast into Livingston County then turns south passing 1.5 miles west of Wheeling and under US Route 36. It turns to the southeast flowing past Bedford Station on the Norfolk and Western Railway to its confluence with the Grand River one mile west of the southwest corner of Linn County at 39°42′39″N 93°22′57″W and an elevation of 653 feet.
