= Boynton, Missouri =

Unincorporated community in Missouri, U.S.

Coordinates: 40°17′02″N 93°05′04″W

Boynton was an unincorporated community in Sullivan County, in the U.S. state of Missouri.

The community was on Missouri Route N, 1.5 miles (2.4 km) east of Missouri Route 5 and six miles (9.7 km) north-northeast of Milan. East Locust Creek flows past the west side of the community. The Chicago, Burlington and Quincy Railroad passed through the community.

== History ==
Boynton was platted in 1877, and most likely named after Sumner Boynton, a county official. A post office called Boynton was established in 1876 and remained in operation until 1953.

As of 2022, all of the existing structures in Boyton have been removed to make way for the new Roy Blunt Reservoir, which will submerge the town's existing site.
