= Henry Cemetery =

Cemetery in Sullivan County, Missouri, US

- U.S. National Register of Historic Places
- Location within Missouri Location within the United States
- Location: Eastern side of Route Z, approximately 1 mile south of Reger, near Reger, Missouri
- Coordinates: 40°7′43″N 93°11′57″W
- Area: 2 acres (0.81 ha)
- Built: 1841
- Architectural style: Cemetery
- NRHP reference No.: 05001472
- Added to NRHP: December 28, 2005

Henry Cemetery is a historic cemetery located near Reger, Sullivan County, Missouri. The cemetery was founded in 1841 and contains approximately 200 graves dated prior to 1955. It contains a variety of grave markers from simple limestone slabs with hand carved names to more elaborate Victorian-era stones. The cemetery remains in use.

It was listed on the National Register of Historic Places in 2005.
