= Mystic, Missouri =

Unincorporated community in Missouri, U.S.

Coordinates: 40°09′23″N 92°55′55″W

Mystic is an unincorporated community in eastern Sullivan County, in the U.S. state of Missouri.

The community is located at the intersection of routes 129 and C ten miles east-southeast of Milan. Green City is approximately 7.5 miles north and Winigan is seven miles south on route 129. Sticklerville is two miles east on Missouri Route H. The community is on a ridge between East Yellow Creek two miles west and Mussel Fork two miles east.

The community had a post office from 1898 until 1903.
