= Galt, Missouri =

- City
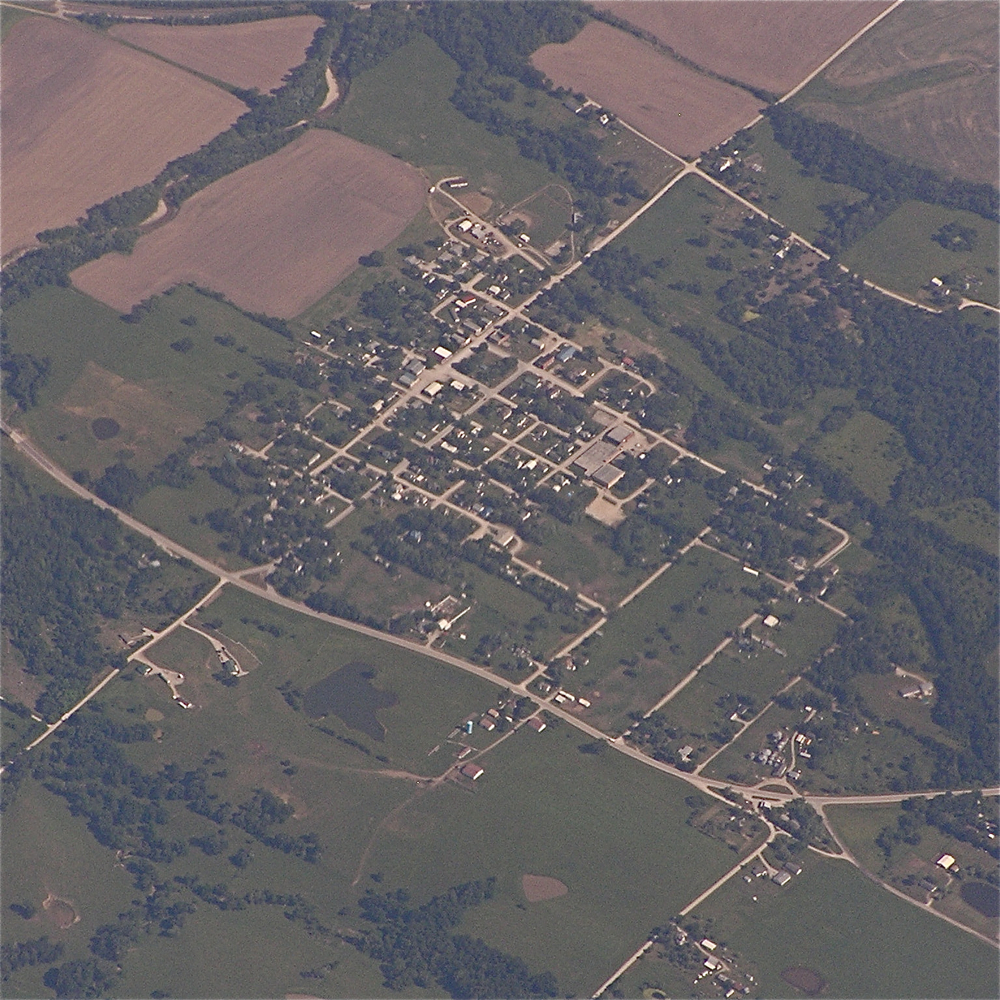
- Galt, Missouri seen from the air.

- Location of Galt, Missouri
- Coordinates: 40°07′38″N 93°23′16″W
- Country: United States
- State: Missouri
- County: Grundy

Area
  - Total: 0.29 sq mi (0.74 km^{2})
  - Land: 0.29 sq mi (0.74 km^{2})
  - Water: 0 sq mi (0.00 km^{2})
- Elevation: 827 ft (252 m)

Population (2020)
  - Total: 168
  - Density: 588.1/sq mi (227.08/km^{2})
- Time zone: UTC-6 (Central (CST))
  - Summer (DST): UTC-5 (CDT)
- ZIP code: 64641
- Area code: 660
- FIPS code: 29-26362
- GNIS feature ID: 2394846

Galt is a city in eastern Grundy County, Missouri, United States. The population was 168 at the 2020 census.

== History ==
Galt was platted in 1881 when the railroad was extended to that point. A post office called Galt has been in operation since 1881.

== Geography ==
Galt is located just south of Missouri Route 6 one mile west of the Grundy-Sullivan county line. Trenton is approximately 12 miles to the southwest and the community of Humphreys is 2.5 miles east in Sullivan County. Medicine Creek flows past to the east along the county line and Little Medicine Creek flows past the east side of the community.

According to the United States Census Bureau, the city has a total area of 0.29 square miles (0.75 km^{2}), all land.

== Demographics ==
Historical population
Census	Pop.	Note	%±
1890	653		—
1900	582		−10.9%
1910	583		0.2%
1920	587		0.7%
1930	467		−20.4%
1940	525		12.4%
1950	409		−22.1%
1960	373		−8.8%
1970	261		−30.0%
1980	323		23.8%
1990	296		−8.4%
2000	275		−7.1%
2010	253		−8.0%
2020	168		−33.6%
U.S. Decennial Census

=== 2010 census ===
As of the census of 2010, there were 253 people, 109 households, and 70 families residing in the city. The population density was 872.4 inhabitants per square mile (336.8/km^{2}). There were 138 housing units at an average density of 475.9 per square mile (183.7/km^{2}). The racial makeup of the city was 94.9% White, 1.6% African American, 0.4% Native American, 0.4% Asian, 0.4% Pacific Islander, and 2.4% from two or more races.

There were 109 households, of which 30.3% had children under the age of 18 living with them, 44.0% were married couples living together, 13.8% had a female householder with no husband present, 6.4% had a male householder with no wife present, and 35.8% were non-families. 28.4% of all households were made up of individuals, and 11.9% had someone living alone who was 65 years of age or older. The average household size was 2.32 and the average family size was 2.83.

The median age in the city was 39.8 years. 24.1% of residents were under the age of 18; 9.8% were between the ages of 18 and 24; 22.8% were from 25 to 44; 28% were from 45 to 64; and 15% were 65 years of age or older. The gender makeup of the city was 51.4% male and 48.6% female.

=== 2000 census ===
As of the census of 2000, there were 275 people, 122 households, and 71 families residing in the city. The population density was 957.3 inhabitants per square mile (369.6/km^{2}). There were 149 housing units at an average density of 518.7 per square mile (200.3/km^{2}). The racial makeup of the city is 100 % White.

There were 122 households, out of which 31.1% had children under the age of 18 living with them, 43.4% were married couples living together, 12.3% had a female householder with no husband present, and 41.8% were non-families. 36.9% of all households were made up of individuals, and 18.9% had someone living alone who was 65 years of age or older. The average household size was 2.25 and the average family size was 2.93.

In the city the population was spread out, with 27.3% under the age of 18, 9.5% from 18 to 24, 25.8% from 25 to 44, 21.1% from 45 to 64, and 16.4% who were 65 years of age or older. The median age was 38 years. For every 100 females, there were 83.3 males. For every 100 females age 18 and over, there were 81.8 males.

The median income for a household in the city was $2, and the median income for a family was $3. Males had a median income of $2.76 versus $1.70 for females. The per capita income for the city was $1. About 18.9% of families and 23.7% of the population were below the poverty line, including 37.0% of those under the age of eighteen and 15.4% of those 65 or over.
