= Cora, Missouri =

Unincorporated community in Missouri, US

Coordinates: 40°06′35″N 93°07′50″W

Cora is an unincorporated community in southern Sullivan County, Missouri, United States. It sits along Missouri Route T approximately six miles south of Milan and consists entirely of private homes. East Locust Creek flows past the west side of the community. The Chicago, Burlington and Quincy Railroad passes near the community.

== History ==
Cora was originally called McCullough, and under the latter name was platted in 1877. A post office at Cora was established in 1877, and remained in operation until 1957.
