= Owasco, Missouri =

Unincorporated community in Missouri, U.S.

Coordinates: 40°08′17″N 92°58′41″W

Owasco is an unincorporated community in Sullivan County, in the U.S. state of Missouri.

The community is on Missouri Route V approximately 8.5 miles southeast of Milan. The community of Mystic on Missouri Route 129 is about 2.5 miles to the northeast. The community is on a ridge between East and West Yellow Creeks.

== History ==
A post office called Owasco was established in 1858, and remained in operation until 1919. Owasco is an Indian name for "bridge". Besides the post office, Owasco had a country store.
