= Pleasant Hill Township =

Pleasant Hill Township may refer to:

- Pleasant Hill Township, Izard County, Arkansas, in Izard County, Arkansas
- Pleasant Hill Township, Newton County, Arkansas, in Newton County, Arkansas
- Pleasant Hill Township, Pike County, Illinois
- Pleasant Hill Township, Winona County, Minnesota
- Pleasant Hill Township, Cass County, Missouri
- Pleasant Hill Township, Sullivan County, Missouri
- Pleasant Hill Township, Northampton County, North Carolina, in Northampton County, North Carolina
- Pleasant Hill Township, Kidder County, North Dakota, in Kidder County, North Dakota
