= Polk Township, Indiana =

Polk Township, Indiana may refer to one of the following places:

- Polk Township, Huntington County, Indiana
- Polk Township, Marshall County, Indiana
- Polk Township, Monroe County, Indiana
- Polk Township, Washington County, Indiana

== See also ==
- Polk Township (disambiguation)
