= 1992 United States presidential election in Missouri =

- November 3, 1992

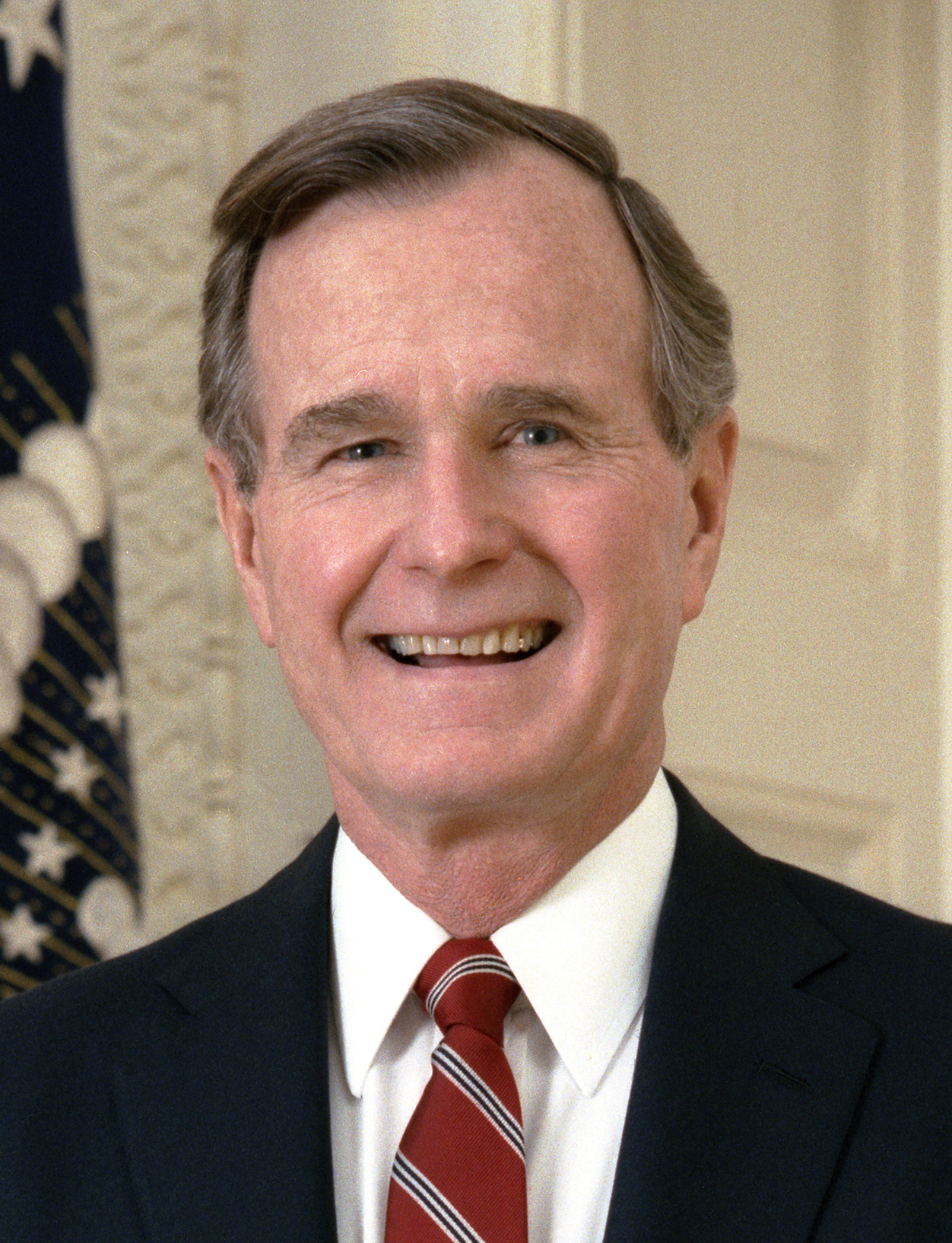

Nominee	Bill Clinton	George H. W. Bush	Ross Perot
Party	Democratic	Republican	Independent
Home state	Arkansas	Texas	Texas
Running mate	Al Gore	Dan Quayle	James Stockdale
Electoral vote	11	0	0
Popular vote	1,053,873	811,159	518,741
Percentage	44.07%	33.92%	21.69%
County results
Clinton
30–40%
40–50%
50–60%
60–70%
Bush
30–40%
40–50%
50–60%
President before election
George H. W. Bush
Republican
Elected President
Bill Clinton
Democratic

The 1992 United States presidential election in Missouri was held on November 3, 1992, as part of the broader 1992 United States presidential election in all fifty states and the District of Columbia. Voters chose 11 electors, or representatives to the Electoral College, who voted for President and Vice-president.

From 1904 to 2004, Missouri voted for the eventual winner of every presidential election except 1956. The state was won in 1992 by Governor of Arkansas Bill Clinton (D) with 44.07 percent of the popular vote, over incumbent President George Herbert Walker Bush (R) with 33.92 percent of the popular vote — the smallest vote share for a Republican since 1860 when the party was not seriously contesting slave states outside of the Missouri Rhineland. Independent Ross Perot performed extremely well for a third-party candidate with 21.69 percent of the popular vote — the best third-party performance in Missouri since Constitutional Unionist John Bell in that same 1860 election.

== Campaign ==
The first presidential debate was held in St. Louis on October 11.

Bush's failure can be seen in Clinton being the solitary Democrat to win staunchly Unionist German “Forty-Eighter” Warren County since Stephen A. Douglas in 1860, and the first Democrat to carry similarly Unionist Ozark Hickory County since that same election. (Note: Unlike Warren County, Hickory County would also back Clinton against Bob Dole in 1996.)

As of the 2024 presidential election, this remains the last time that Morgan, Dallas, Howell, Harrison, Adair, Andrew, Johnson, Butler, Atchison, Phelps, Platte, Maries, Stoddard, Pulaski, Dent, Texas, and Carter Counties have voted for a Democratic presidential candidate. It was also the last time that a Democrat carried the state by double digits, the last double-digit win for any candidate until 2016, the last time that Missouri has voted to the left of neighboring Iowa, and the last time that the state voted more Democratic than the nation as a whole, weighing in at about 4 points more Democratic.

== Results ==
1992 United States presidential election in Missouri
Party	Candidate	Votes	Percentage	Electoral votes
Democratic	Bill Clinton	1,053,873	44.07%	11
Republican	George H. W. Bush (incumbent)	811,159	33.92%	0
Independent	Ross Perot	518,741	21.69%	0
Libertarian	Andre Marrou	7,497	0.31%	0
Write-ins	Various candidates	542	0.02%	0
Totals		2,391,312	100.0%	11

=== Results by county ===
County	Bill Clinton Democratic		George H.W. Bush Republican		Ross Perot Independent		Various candidates Other parties		Margin		Total votes cast
County	#	%	#	%	#	%	#	%	#	%	Total votes cast
Adair	4,232	39.77%	4,141	38.92%	2,224	20.90%	43	0.40%	91	0.85%	10,640
Andrew	2,675	35.72%	2,652	35.41%	2,151	28.72%	11	0.15%	23	0.31%	7,489
Atchison	1,208	37.76%	1,140	35.64%	840	26.26%	11	0.34%	68	2.12%	3,199
Audrain	4,731	44.41%	3,798	35.65%	2,099	19.70%	26	0.24%	933	8.76%	10,654
Barry	4,791	37.56%	5,565	43.62%	2,381	18.66%	20	0.16%	-774	-6.06%	12,757
Barton	1,433	27.59%	2,775	53.43%	971	18.69%	15	0.29%	-1,342	-25.84%	5,194
Bates	2,993	38.72%	2,499	32.33%	2,225	28.78%	13	0.17%	494	6.39%	7,730
Benton	3,195	43.91%	2,511	34.51%	1,551	21.32%	19	0.26%	684	9.40%	7,276
Bollinger	2,150	40.09%	2,289	42.68%	909	16.95%	15	0.28%	-139	-2.59%	5,363
Boone	26,176	45.22%	19,405	33.52%	12,040	20.80%	269	0.46%	6,771	11.70%	57,890
Buchanan	16,570	44.35%	11,275	30.18%	9,404	25.17%	116	0.31%	5,295	14.17%	37,365
Butler	6,602	43.23%	6,450	42.23%	2,189	14.33%	31	0.20%	152	1.00%	15,272
Caldwell	1,456	35.91%	1,295	31.94%	1,283	31.64%	21	0.52%	161	3.97%	4,055
Callaway	5,799	41.48%	4,880	34.90%	3,266	23.36%	36	0.26%	919	6.58%	13,981
Camden	5,140	35.14%	5,554	37.97%	3,891	26.60%	42	0.29%	-414	-2.83%	14,627
Cape Girardeau	9,605	33.87%	13,464	47.48%	5,199	18.34%	87	0.31%	-3,859	-13.61%	28,355
Carroll	2,100	39.05%	1,774	32.99%	1,495	27.80%	9	0.17%	326	6.06%	5,378
Carter	1,169	43.52%	1,101	40.99%	405	15.08%	11	0.41%	68	2.53%	2,686
Cass	10,246	34.26%	10,349	34.61%	9,216	30.82%	94	0.31%	-103	-0.35%	29,905
Cedar	2,064	38.66%	2,085	39.05%	1,173	21.97%	17	0.32%	-21	-0.39%	5,339
Chariton	2,141	46.53%	1,378	29.95%	1,067	23.19%	15	0.33%	763	16.58%	4,601
Christian	6,242	36.41%	7,422	43.29%	3,422	19.96%	59	0.34%	-1,180	-6.88%	17,145
Clark	1,815	50.64%	1,039	28.99%	725	20.23%	5	0.14%	776	21.65%	3,584
Clay	30,565	40.33%	23,798	31.40%	20,951	27.65%	464	0.61%	6,767	8.93%	75,778
Clinton	3,400	41.32%	2,391	29.06%	2,423	29.45%	14	0.17%	977 (Note: In this county where Bush ran third behind Clinton and Perot, margin given is Clinton vote minus Perot vote and percentage margin Clinton percentage minus Perot percentage.)	11.87%	8,228
Cole	10,201	32.59%	15,270	48.78%	5,770	18.43%	63	0.20%	-5,069	-16.19%	31,304
Cooper	2,709	36.91%	2,867	39.07%	1,735	23.64%	28	0.38%	-158	-2.16%	7,339
Crawford	3,515	41.92%	2,831	33.76%	2,002	23.88%	37	0.44%	684	8.16%	8,385
Dade	1,332	35.51%	1,577	42.04%	834	22.23%	8	0.21%	-245	-6.53%	3,751
Dallas	2,533	41.86%	2,116	34.97%	1,392	23.00%	10	0.17%	417	6.89%	6,051
Daviess	1,477	39.58%	1,107	29.66%	1,143	30.63%	5	0.13%	334	8.95%	3,732
DeKalb	1,630	39.08%	1,318	31.60%	1,207	28.94%	16	0.38%	312	7.48%	4,171
Dent	2,689	45.75%	2,125	36.16%	1,049	17.85%	14	0.24%	564	9.59%	5,877
Douglas	2,126	36.71%	2,569	44.35%	1,081	18.66%	16	0.28%	-443	-7.64%	5,792
Dunklin	6,277	54.68%	4,024	35.06%	1,166	10.16%	12	0.10%	2,253	19.62%	11,479
Franklin	13,431	37.24%	11,477	31.82%	11,043	30.62%	113	0.31%	1,954	5.42%	36,064
Gasconade	1,952	30.82%	2,690	42.47%	1,672	26.40%	20	0.32%	-738	-11.65%	6,334
Gentry	1,519	40.79%	1,272	34.16%	921	24.73%	12	0.32%	247	6.63%	3,724
Greene	41,137	38.91%	46,457	43.95%	17,770	16.81%	349	0.33%	-5,320	-5.04%	105,713
Grundy	1,968	38.55%	1,749	34.26%	1,372	26.88%	16	0.31%	219	4.29%	5,105
Harrison	1,590	37.66%	1,563	37.02%	1,059	25.08%	10	0.24%	27	0.64%	4,222
Henry	4,232	43.45%	2,681	27.53%	2,807	28.82%	20	0.21%	1,425	14.63%	9,740
Hickory	1,929	47.54%	1,259	31.03%	864	21.29%	6	0.15%	670	16.51%	4,058
Holt	1,050	34.49%	1,202	39.49%	781	25.66%	11	0.36%	-152	-5.00%	3,044
Howard	2,085	46.93%	1,253	28.20%	1,090	24.53%	15	0.34%	832	18.73%	4,443
Howell	5,492	40.57%	5,360	39.60%	2,650	19.58%	35	0.26%	132	0.97%	13,537
Iron	2,507	54.10%	1,276	27.54%	841	18.15%	10	0.22%	1,231	26.56%	4,634
Jackson	145,999	50.06%	78,611	26.96%	66,142	22.68%	885	0.30%	67,388	23.10%	291,637
Jasper	11,727	32.69%	17,592	49.04%	6,440	17.95%	113	0.32%	-5,865	-16.35%	35,872
Jefferson	32,569	44.31%	20,637	28.08%	20,057	27.29%	238	0.32%	11,932	16.23%	73,501
Johnson	5,546	36.48%	5,032	33.10%	4,578	30.11%	47	0.31%	514	3.38%	15,203
Knox	1,010	44.65%	724	32.01%	523	23.12%	5	0.22%	286	12.64%	2,262
Laclede	4,179	34.19%	5,176	42.35%	2,852	23.33%	15	0.12%	-997	-8.16%	12,222
Lafayette	5,213	38.71%	4,651	34.54%	3,561	26.44%	42	0.31%	562	4.17%	13,467
Lawrence	4,666	36.20%	5,608	43.50%	2,570	19.94%	47	0.36%	-942	-7.30%	12,891
Lewis	2,196	48.14%	1,461	32.03%	892	19.55%	13	0.28%	735	16.11%	4,562
Lincoln	5,453	42.72%	3,718	29.13%	3,572	27.98%	22	0.17%	1,735	13.59%	12,765
Linn	2,916	45.31%	1,967	30.56%	1,524	23.68%	29	0.45%	949	14.75%	6,436
Livingston	2,505	36.50%	2,370	34.53%	1,976	28.79%	12	0.17%	135	1.97%	6,863
Macon	3,194	44.58%	2,256	31.49%	1,697	23.69%	17	0.24%	938	13.09%	7,164
Madison	2,501	49.21%	1,673	32.92%	899	17.69%	9	0.18%	828	16.29%	5,082
Maries	1,732	43.14%	1,356	33.77%	915	22.79%	12	0.30%	376	9.37%	4,015
Marion	5,156	43.76%	4,762	40.41%	1,841	15.62%	24	0.20%	394	3.35%	11,783
McDonald	2,281	33.18%	3,010	43.78%	1,551	22.56%	33	0.48%	-729	-10.60%	6,875
Mercer	843	45.59%	626	33.86%	378	20.44%	2	0.11%	217	11.73%	1,849
Miller	2,905	30.62%	4,175	44.01%	2,391	25.20%	16	0.17%	-1,270	-13.39%	9,487
Mississippi	3,226	56.73%	1,675	29.45%	776	13.65%	10	0.18%	1,551	27.28%	5,687
Moniteau	2,018	33.15%	2,566	42.15%	1,499	24.62%	5	0.08%	-548	-9.00%	6,088
Monroe	2,060	49.20%	1,153	27.54%	969	23.14%	5	0.12%	907	21.66%	4,187
Montgomery	2,063	38.79%	1,974	37.11%	1,266	23.80%	16	0.30%	89	1.68%	5,319
Morgan	2,906	37.40%	2,819	36.28%	2,028	26.10%	17	0.22%	87	1.12%	7,770
New Madrid	4,883	58.91%	2,431	29.33%	962	11.61%	13	0.16%	2,452	29.58%	8,289
Newton	5,987	32.40%	8,804	47.64%	3,567	19.30%	121	0.65%	-2,817	-15.24%	18,479
Nodaway	3,723	39.66%	3,147	33.52%	2,484	26.46%	34	0.36%	576	6.14%	9,388
Oregon	2,258	53.31%	1,402	33.10%	564	13.31%	12	0.28%	856	20.21%	4,236
Osage	1,860	30.63%	2,784	45.84%	1,423	23.43%	6	0.10%	-924	-15.21%	6,073
Ozark	1,581	37.02%	1,772	41.49%	906	21.21%	12	0.28%	-191	-4.47%	4,271
Pemiscot	3,924	57.98%	2,161	31.93%	670	9.90%	13	0.19%	1,763	26.05%	6,768
Perry	2,525	34.82%	3,205	44.19%	1,498	20.66%	24	0.33%	-680	-9.37%	7,252
Pettis	5,314	32.26%	6,823	41.43%	4,278	25.97%	55	0.33%	-1,509	-9.17%	16,470
Phelps	6,852	40.93%	6,040	36.08%	3,774	22.55%	73	0.44%	812	4.85%	16,739
Pike	3,609	49.20%	2,255	30.74%	1,464	19.96%	8	0.11%	1,354	18.46%	7,336
Platte	10,920	37.04%	9,380	31.82%	9,062	30.74%	116	0.39%	1,540	5.22%	29,478
Polk	3,316	38.22%	3,465	39.94%	1,879	21.66%	15	0.17%	-149	-1.72%	8,675
Pulaski	4,113	41.18%	3,793	37.98%	2,057	20.59%	25	0.25%	320	3.20%	9,988
Putnam	838	33.48%	1,143	45.67%	522	20.85%	0	0.00%	-305	-12.19%	2,503
Ralls	2,158	49.12%	1,349	30.71%	880	20.03%	6	0.14%	809	18.41%	4,393
Randolph	4,951	48.49%	3,025	29.63%	2,212	21.67%	22	0.22%	1,926	18.86%	10,210
Ray	4,457	46.33%	2,563	26.64%	2,567	26.68%	33	0.34%	1,890	19.65%	9,620
Reynolds	2,014	60.57%	776	23.34%	532	16.00%	3	0.09%	1,238	37.23%	3,325
Ripley	2,300	47.33%	1,814	37.33%	739	15.21%	7	0.14%	486	10.00%	4,860
St. Charles	37,263	34.97%	38,673	36.29%	30,351	28.48%	276	0.26%	-1,410	-1.32%	106,563
St. Clair	1,965	42.62%	1,555	33.72%	1,083	23.49%	8	0.17%	410	8.90%	4,611
St. Francois	9,367	49.44%	5,889	31.08%	3,635	19.19%	56	0.30%	3,478	18.36%	18,947
St. Louis	235,760	44.09%	188,285	35.21%	109,099	20.40%	1,619	0.30%	47,475	8.88%	534,763
St. Louis City	102,356	69.44%	25,441	17.26%	18,864	12.80%	743	0.50%	76,915	52.18%	147,404
Ste. Genevieve	3,795	53.17%	1,780	24.94%	1,547	21.68%	15	0.21%	2,015	28.23%	7,137
Saline	4,643	45.67%	2,688	26.44%	2,815	27.69%	20	0.20%	1,828	17.98%	10,166
Schuyler	936	43.13%	742	34.19%	487	22.44%	5	0.23%	194	8.94%	2,170
Scotland	1,070	42.90%	798	32.00%	617	24.74%	9	0.36%	272	10.90%	2,494
Scott	7,452	45.14%	6,265	37.95%	2,763	16.74%	27	0.16%	1,187	7.19%	16,507
Shannon	2,135	54.02%	1,224	30.97%	579	14.65%	14	0.35%	911	23.05%	3,952
Shelby	1,435	42.28%	1,169	34.44%	786	23.16%	4	0.12%	266	7.84%	3,394
Stoddard	5,720	46.47%	4,608	37.44%	1,977	16.06%	3	0.02%	1,112	9.03%	12,308
Stone	3,256	35.41%	4,035	43.88%	1,884	20.49%	21	0.23%	-779	-8.47%	9,196
Sullivan	1,510	43.95%	1,326	38.59%	596	17.35%	4	0.12%	184	5.36%	3,436
Taney	4,682	35.46%	6,081	46.05%	2,395	18.14%	47	0.36%	-1,399	-10.59%	13,205
Texas	4,597	45.97%	3,470	34.70%	1,900	19.00%	34	0.34%	1,127	11.27%	10,001
Vernon	3,546	42.71%	2,851	34.34%	1,890	22.76%	16	0.19%	695	8.37%	8,303
Warren	3,213	37.11%	2,953	34.10%	2,471	28.54%	22	0.25%	260	3.01%	8,659
Washington	4,211	52.57%	2,157	26.93%	1,618	20.20%	24	0.30%	2,054	25.64%	8,010
Wayne	3,073	51.05%	2,101	34.91%	837	13.91%	8	0.13%	972	16.14%	6,019
Webster	4,149	38.99%	4,361	40.99%	2,108	19.81%	22	0.21%	-212	-2.00%	10,640
Worth	599	42.39%	483	34.18%	328	23.21%	3	0.21%	116	8.21%	1,413
Wright	2,814	36.62%	3,427	44.60%	1,425	18.55%	18	0.23%	-613	-7.98%	7,684
Totals	1,053,873	44.07%	811,159	33.92%	518,741	21.69%	7,792	0.32%	242,714	10.15%	2,391,565

==== Counties that flipped from Republican to Democratic ====
- Adair
- Andrew
- Atchison
- Bates
- Benton
- Butler
- Caldwell
- Callaway
- Carroll
- Carter
- Clay
- Crawford
- Dallas
- Daviess
- Dent
- Franklin
- Grundy
- Harrison
- Henry
- Hickory
- Howell
- Jefferson
- Johnson
- Lafayette
- Lincoln
- Livingston
- Macon
- Madison
- Maries
- Montgomery
- Morgan
- Phelps
- Platte
- Pulaski
- Ripley
- Schuyler
- Scotland
- Scott
- St. Clair
- St. Louis County
- Stoddard
- Sullivan
- Texas
- Vernon
- Warren
- Wayne

== See also ==
- United States presidential elections in Missouri
- Presidency of Bill Clinton

== Works cited ==
- Abramson, Paul; Aldrich, John; Rohde, David (1995). Change and Continuity in the 1992 Elections. CQ Press. ISBN 0871878399.
