= Wintersville, Missouri =

Unincorporated community in Missouri, U.S.

Coordinates: 40°16′06″N 93°19′37″W

Wintersville is an unincorporated community in western Sullivan County, in the U.S. state of Missouri.

The community is on Missouri Route WW 2.5 miles southeast of Harris and one mile east of Medicine Creek.

== History ==
Wintersville was platted in 1857 by J. N. Winters, and named for him. A post office called Wintersville was established in 1857, and remained in operation until 1904.
