= 1988 United States presidential election in Missouri =

- November 8, 1988

Nominee	George H. W. Bush	Michael Dukakis
Party	Republican	Democratic
Home state	Texas	Massachusetts
Running mate	Dan Quayle	Lloyd Bentsen
Electoral vote	11	0
Popular vote	1,084,953	1,001,619
Percentage	51.83%	47.85%

Bush
50–60%
60–70%
70–80%
80–90%
Dukakis
50–60%
60–70%
70–80%
80–90%
President before election
Ronald Reagan
Republican
Elected President
George H. W. Bush
Republican

The 1988 United States presidential election in Missouri took place on November 8, 1988. All 50 states and the District of Columbia, were part of the 1988 United States presidential election. Voters chose 11 electors to the Electoral College, which selected the president and vice president.

Missouri was won by incumbent United States Vice President George H. W. Bush of Texas, who was running against Massachusetts Governor Michael Dukakis. Bush ran with Indiana Senator Dan Quayle as vice president, and Dukakis ran with Texas Senator Lloyd Bentsen.

Missouri weighed in for this election as almost 4% more Democratic than the national average.

The presidential election of 1988 was a very partisan election for Missouri, with more than 99% of the electorate voting for either the Democratic or Republican parties, and only three parties total appearing on the ballot. In typical form for the time, the more rural counties in Missouri turned out for the Republican candidate, while the more populated centers of the city of St. Louis (though, notably, not St. Louis County), and Kansas City, voted overwhelmingly Democratic. As of the 2024 presidential election, this is the last election in which St. Louis County voted for a Republican presidential candidate.

Bush won the election in the battleground state of Missouri by a narrow 4-point margin, far below the margin of victory Reagan achieved just four years earlier. Bush's loss of many northern rural counties, combined with Dukakis's strong performance in the St. Louis city area, resulted in an unusually close result in the state given the national environment. A longtime bellwether state, Missouri voted for the national winner of every presidential election from 1904 to 2004, except 1956.

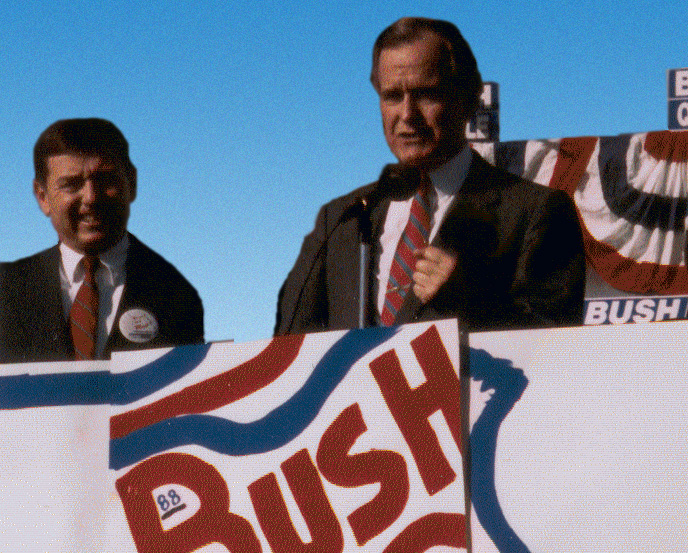
Bush speaking at a rally in St. Louis, 1988

== Results ==
1988 United States presidential election in Missouri
Party	Candidate	Votes	Percentage	Electoral votes
Republican	George H. W. Bush	1,084,953	51.83%	11
Democratic	Michael Dukakis	1,001,619	47.85%	0
New Alliance Party	Lenora Fulani	6,656	0.32%	0
Totals		2,093,228	100.0%	11

=== Results by county ===
County	George H.W. Bush Republican		Michael Dukakis Democratic		Leonora Fulani New Alliance		Margin		Total votes cast
County	#	%	#	%	#	%	#	%	Total votes cast
Adair	5,721	61.29%	3,571	38.26%	42	0.45%	2,150	23.03%	9,334
Andrew	3,407	52.12%	3,103	47.47%	27	0.41%	304	4.65%	6,537
Atchison	1,761	54.37%	1,468	45.32%	10	0.31%	293	9.05%	3,239
Audrain	5,072	49.11%	5,226	50.61%	29	0.28%	-154	-1.50%	10,327
Barry	7,231	63.00%	4,210	36.68%	36	0.31%	3,021	26.32%	11,477
Barton	3,339	67.35%	1,603	32.33%	16	0.32%	1,736	35.02%	4,958
Bates	3,574	51.57%	3,332	48.08%	24	0.35%	242	3.49%	6,930
Benton	3,467	56.42%	2,654	43.19%	24	0.39%	813	13.23%	6,145
Bollinger	2,710	58.94%	1,883	40.95%	5	0.11%	827	17.99%	4,598
Boone	22,948	48.35%	24,370	51.35%	140	0.29%	-1,422	-3.00%	47,458
Buchanan	15,336	44.99%	18,601	54.57%	152	0.45%	-3,265	-9.58%	34,089
Butler	7,968	58.00%	5,751	41.86%	19	0.14%	2,217	16.14%	13,738
Caldwell	2,074	54.38%	1,726	45.25%	14	0.37%	348	9.13%	3,814
Callaway	6,687	56.01%	5,209	43.63%	42	0.35%	1,478	12.38%	11,938
Camden	7,773	66.10%	3,930	33.42%	56	0.48%	3,843	32.68%	11,759
Cape Girardeau	16,583	67.53%	7,904	32.19%	69	0.28%	8,679	35.34%	24,556
Carroll	2,811	54.59%	2,330	45.25%	8	0.16%	481	9.34%	5,149
Carter	1,429	56.53%	1,087	43.00%	12	0.47%	342	13.53%	2,528
Cass	12,799	55.75%	10,092	43.96%	67	0.29%	2,707	11.79%	22,958
Cedar	2,966	62.52%	1,774	37.39%	4	0.08%	1,192	25.13%	4,744
Chariton	2,193	48.14%	2,347	51.53%	15	0.33%	-154	-3.39%	4,555
Christian	7,670	61.66%	4,724	37.97%	46	0.37%	2,946	23.69%	12,440
Clark	1,493	43.52%	1,925	56.11%	13	0.38%	-432	-12.59%	3,431
Clay	30,293	50.26%	29,620	49.15%	357	0.59%	673	1.11%	60,270
Clinton	3,282	47.15%	3,653	52.48%	26	0.37%	-371	-5.33%	6,961
Cole	18,023	68.16%	8,359	31.61%	59	0.22%	9,664	36.55%	26,441
Cooper	3,737	59.64%	2,510	40.06%	19	0.30%	1,227	19.58%	6,266
Crawford	3,856	55.19%	3,107	44.47%	24	0.34%	749	10.72%	6,987
Dade	2,154	61.97%	1,315	37.83%	7	0.20%	839	24.14%	3,476
Dallas	2,898	55.50%	2,298	44.01%	26	0.50%	600	11.49%	5,222
Daviess	1,765	50.17%	1,743	49.55%	10	0.28%	22	0.62%	3,518
DeKalb	1,863	48.48%	1,970	51.26%	10	0.26%	-107	-2.78%	3,843
Dent	2,975	54.92%	2,421	44.69%	21	0.39%	554	10.23%	5,417
Douglas	3,225	64.85%	1,735	34.89%	13	0.26%	1,490	29.96%	4,973
Dunklin	5,026	48.70%	5,281	51.17%	13	0.13%	-255	-2.47%	10,320
Franklin	16,611	58.06%	11,891	41.56%	108	0.38%	4,720	16.50%	28,610
Gasconade	4,216	72.01%	1,621	27.69%	18	0.31%	2,595	44.32%	5,855
Gentry	1,554	45.27%	1,872	54.53%	7	0.20%	-318	-9.26%	3,433
Greene	52,211	59.36%	35,475	40.33%	267	0.30%	16,736	19.03%	87,953
Grundy	2,668	56.38%	2,052	43.36%	12	0.25%	616	13.02%	4,732
Harrison	2,271	55.89%	1,776	43.71%	16	0.39%	495	12.18%	4,063
Henry	4,167	50.04%	4,135	49.65%	26	0.31%	32	0.39%	8,328
Hickory	2,043	54.82%	1,677	45.00%	7	0.19%	366	9.82%	3,727
Holt	1,583	55.54%	1,258	44.14%	9	0.32%	325	11.40%	2,850
Howard	1,865	43.15%	2,446	56.59%	11	0.25%	-581	-13.44%	4,322
Howell	7,277	62.49%	4,324	37.13%	44	0.38%	2,953	25.36%	11,645
Iron	1,877	45.01%	2,283	54.75%	10	0.24%	-406	-9.74%	4,170
Jackson	107,810	42.02%	147,964	57.67%	793	0.31%	-40,154	-15.65%	256,567
Jasper	19,934	63.92%	11,159	35.78%	94	0.30%	8,775	28.14%	31,187
Jefferson	29,279	51.16%	27,738	48.47%	215	0.38%	1,541	2.69%	57,232
Johnson	7,512	58.14%	5,373	41.58%	36	0.28%	2,139	16.56%	12,921
Knox	1,212	49.03%	1,255	50.77%	5	0.20%	-43	-1.74%	2,472
Laclede	6,070	63.65%	3,442	36.09%	24	0.25%	2,628	27.56%	9,536
Lafayette	6,825	54.54%	5,654	45.18%	35	0.28%	1,171	9.36%	12,514
Lawrence	6,911	60.73%	4,432	38.95%	36	0.32%	2,479	21.78%	11,379
Lewis	1,803	42.20%	2,460	57.57%	10	0.23%	-657	-15.37%	4,273
Lincoln	5,305	53.38%	4,605	46.34%	28	0.28%	700	7.04%	9,938
Linn	3,061	49.15%	3,150	50.58%	17	0.27%	-89	-1.43%	6,228
Livingston	3,462	52.88%	3,077	47.00%	8	0.12%	385	5.88%	6,547
Macon	3,406	51.30%	3,215	48.43%	18	0.27%	191	2.87%	6,639
Madison	2,528	53.75%	2,167	46.08%	8	0.17%	361	7.67%	4,703
Maries	1,919	55.14%	1,552	44.60%	9	0.26%	367	10.54%	3,480
Marion	5,034	47.16%	5,617	52.62%	23	0.22%	-583	-5.46%	10,674
McDonald	3,812	61.95%	2,299	37.36%	42	0.68%	1,513	24.59%	6,153
Mercer	875	49.89%	877	50.00%	2	0.11%	-2	-0.11%	1,754
Miller	5,662	68.82%	2,555	31.06%	10	0.12%	3,107	37.76%	8,227
Mississippi	2,218	43.99%	2,814	55.81%	10	0.20%	-596	-11.82%	5,042
Moniteau	3,502	64.30%	1,936	35.55%	8	0.15%	1,566	28.75%	5,446
Monroe	1,542	38.42%	2,461	61.31%	11	0.27%	-919	-22.89%	4,014
Montgomery	2,714	56.66%	2,064	43.09%	12	0.25%	650	13.57%	4,790
Morgan	3,958	60.13%	2,604	39.56%	20	0.30%	1,354	20.57%	6,582
New Madrid	3,387	46.99%	3,812	52.89%	9	0.12%	-425	-5.90%	7,208
Newton	10,617	64.36%	5,798	35.15%	82	0.50%	4,819	29.21%	16,497
Nodaway	4,103	48.92%	4,240	50.55%	44	0.52%	-137	-1.63%	8,387
Oregon	1,717	45.59%	2,042	54.22%	7	0.19%	-325	-8.63%	3,766
Osage	3,885	68.58%	1,771	31.26%	9	0.16%	2,114	37.32%	5,665
Ozark	2,404	64.21%	1,329	35.50%	11	0.29%	1,075	28.71%	3,744
Pemiscot	3,066	48.18%	3,288	51.67%	10	0.16%	-222	-3.49%	6,364
Perry	3,836	64.08%	2,136	35.68%	14	0.23%	1,700	28.40%	5,986
Pettis	9,648	63.47%	5,486	36.09%	66	0.43%	4,162	27.38%	15,200
Phelps	8,329	58.44%	5,867	41.16%	57	0.40%	2,462	17.28%	14,253
Pike	3,271	46.07%	3,816	53.75%	13	0.18%	-545	-7.68%	7,100
Platte	11,838	51.18%	11,225	48.53%	66	0.29%	613	2.65%	23,129
Polk	5,030	59.39%	3,419	40.37%	21	0.25%	1,611	19.02%	8,470
Pulaski	4,642	57.22%	3,446	42.48%	24	0.30%	1,196	14.74%	8,112
Putnam	1,365	62.73%	803	36.90%	8	0.37%	562	25.83%	2,176
Ralls	1,494	37.44%	2,489	62.38%	7	0.18%	-995	-24.94%	3,990
Randolph	4,384	45.22%	5,291	54.57%	20	0.21%	-907	-9.35%	9,695
Ray	3,763	43.44%	4,879	56.33%	20	0.23%	-1,116	-12.89%	8,662
Reynolds	1,162	38.29%	1,864	61.42%	9	0.30%	-702	-23.13%	3,035
Ripley	2,647	57.29%	1,961	42.45%	12	0.26%	686	14.84%	4,620
St. Charles	50,005	62.90%	29,286	36.84%	209	0.26%	20,719	26.06%	79,500
St. Clair	2,312	55.27%	1,864	44.56%	7	0.17%	448	10.71%	4,183
St. Francois	7,923	49.13%	8,158	50.59%	46	0.29%	-235	-1.46%	16,127
St. Louis	262,784	54.67%	216,534	45.05%	1,358	0.28%	46,250	9.62%	480,676
St. Louis City	40,906	26.96%	110,076	72.55%	732	0.48%	-69,170	-45.59%	151,714
Ste. Genevieve	2,532	41.08%	3,612	58.60%	20	0.32%	-1,080	-17.52%	6,164
Saline	4,625	47.70%	5,039	51.97%	32	0.33%	-414	-4.27%	9,696
Schuyler	1,063	51.11%	1,013	48.70%	4	0.19%	50	2.41%	2,080
Scotland	1,248	52.61%	1,117	47.09%	7	0.30%	131	5.52%	2,372
Scott	8,013	57.45%	5,914	42.40%	21	0.15%	2,099	15.05%	13,948
Shannon	1,696	48.46%	1,796	51.31%	8	0.23%	-100	-2.85%	3,500
Shelby	1,586	46.54%	1,818	53.35%	4	0.12%	-232	-6.81%	3,408
Stoddard	5,822	55.25%	4,701	44.61%	15	0.14%	1,121	10.64%	10,538
Stone	5,080	63.49%	2,889	36.11%	32	0.40%	2,191	27.38%	8,001
Sullivan	1,897	54.75%	1,562	45.08%	6	0.17%	335	9.67%	3,465
Taney	7,043	64.16%	3,888	35.42%	46	0.42%	3,155	28.74%	10,977
Texas	4,584	53.91%	3,887	45.71%	32	0.38%	697	8.20%	8,503
Vernon	4,149	54.79%	3,402	44.93%	21	0.28%	747	9.86%	7,572
Warren	4,452	60.07%	2,935	39.60%	24	0.32%	1,517	20.47%	7,411
Washington	3,240	46.29%	3,744	53.49%	16	0.23%	-504	-7.20%	7,000
Wayne	2,648	51.80%	2,456	48.04%	8	0.16%	192	3.76%	5,112
Webster	5,123	56.70%	3,890	43.05%	22	0.24%	1,233	13.65%	9,035
Worth	677	47.98%	732	51.88%	2	0.14%	-55	-3.90%	1,411
Wright	4,151	64.92%	2,232	34.91%	11	0.17%	1,919	30.01%	6,394
Totals	1,084,953	51.83%	1,001,619	47.85%	6,656	0.32%	83,334	3.98%	2,093,228

==== Counties that flipped from Republican to Democratic ====
- Audrain
- Boone
- Buchanan
- Chariton
- Clark
- Clinton
- DeKalb
- Dunklin
- Gentry
- Howard
- Iron
- Knox
- Lewis
- Linn
- Marion
- Mercer
- Monroe
- New Madrid
- Nodaway
- Pemiscot
- Pike
- Ralls
- Randolph
- Ray
- St. Francois
- St. Genevieve
- Saline
- Shannon
- Shelby
- Washington
- Worth

=== By congressional district ===
Bush won seven of nine congressional districts, including three that elected a Democrat.

District	Bush	Dukakis	Representative
1st	27%	73%	Bill Clay
2nd	61%	39%	Jack Buechner
3rd	53%	47%	Dick Gephardt
4th	59%	41%	Ike Skelton
5th	39%	61%	Alan Wheat
6th	50%	50%	Tom Coleman
7th	62%	38%	Mel Hancock
8th	55%	45%	Bill Emerson
9th	54%	46%	Harold Volkmer

== See also ==
- United States presidential elections in Missouri
- Presidency of George H. W. Bush
