= Winterville =

Winterville or Wintersville may refer to:

- Winterville (band), a British-based blues-rock trio

Places in the United States

- Winterville, Georgia
- Wintersville, Missouri
- Winterville, North Carolina
- Wintersville, Ohio
- Wintersville, Pennsylvania
- Winterville Plantation, Maine
- Winterville site

== See also ==
- Winterval, a festival in Birmingham, England, that is often referred to as "Winterville"
