= Pleasant Mound Township =

Pleasant Mound Township may refer to the following places in the United States:

- Pleasant Mound Township, Illinois
- Pleasant Mound Township, Blue Earth County, Minnesota

== See also ==
- Pleasant Hill Township (disambiguation)
