= Bowman Township, Sullivan County, Missouri =

Township in the American state of Missouri

Coordinates: 40.1622°N 93.2803°W

Bowman Township is a township in Sullivan County, in the U.S. state of Missouri.

Bowman Township was erected in 1872, taking its name from the community of Bowmansville. The location of the extinct town of Bowmansville is unknown to the GNIS.
