= Pleasant Hill Township, Cass County, Missouri =

Inactive township in the US state of Missouri

Coordinates: 38.7731°N 94.2639°W

Pleasant Hill Township is an inactive township in Cass County, in the U.S. state of Missouri.

Pleasant Hill Township was established in 1872, taking its name from Pleasant Hill, Missouri.

Duncan Branch and Big Creek flow through this township.
