= Buchanan Township, Sullivan County, Missouri =

Township in the U.S. state of Missouri

Coordinates: 40.3517°N 92.9278°W

Buchanan Township is a township in Sullivan County, in the U.S. state of Missouri.

Buchanan Township was erected in 1872, taking its name James Buchanan, 15th President of the United States.
