= Reger, Missouri =

Unincorporated community in Missouri, U.S.

Coordinates: 40°08′38″N 93°11′34″W

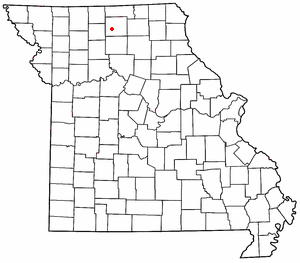

Reger is an unincorporated community in Sullivan County, Missouri, United States. It is located along Missouri Route 6, approximately six miles southwest of Milan. Locust Creek flows past just to the east.

Reger was laid out in 1881. The community has the name of O. M. Reger, an early citizen. A post office called Reger was established in 1881, and remained in operation until 1968.

Henry Cemetery was listed on the National Register of Historic Places in 2005.
