= Union Township, Sullivan County, Missouri =

Township in Sullivan County, Missouri, U.S.

Coordinates: 40.1703°N 92.9469°W

Union Township is a township in Sullivan County, in the U.S. state of Missouri.

Union Township was erected in 1872.
