= Lindley, Missouri =

Unincorporated community in Missouri, U.S.

Coordinates: 40°04′55″N 93°22′06″W

Lindley is an unincorporated community in Grundy and Sullivan counties, in the U.S. state of Missouri.

== History ==
Lindley was platted in 1845, and named after James J. Lindley, a state legislator. A post office called Lindley was established in 1854, and remained in operation until 1906.
