= Pennville, Missouri =

Unincorporated community in Missouri, U.S.

Coordinates: 40°21′46″N 92°56′49″W

Pennville is an unincorporated community in northeast Sullivan County, in the U.S. state of Missouri.

The community is on Missouri Route 129 approximately 14 miles northeast of Milan and eight miles south-southeast of Unionville in adjacent Putnam County.

== History ==
A post office called Pennville was established in 1856, and remained in operation until 1909. The community most likely was named after Penn Township.
