= Judson, Missouri =

Unincorporated community in Missouri, U.S.

Coordinates: 40°18′43″N 93°13′50″W

Judson is an unincorporated community in Sullivan County, in the U.S. state of Missouri.

== History ==
A post office called Judson was established in 1861, and remained in operation until 1905. Besides the post office, Judson had a country store.
