= Jacksonville, Sullivan County, Missouri =

Unincorporated community in Missouri, U.S.

Coordinates: 40°16′38″N 93°06′46″W

Jacksonville is an unincorporated community in Sullivan County, Missouri, United States.

== History ==
A variant name was "Jacksons Corners". A post office called Jackson's Corners was established in 1856, and remained in operation until 1876. Branson Jackson, an early postmaster, gave the community his last name.
