= 1952 United States presidential election in Missouri =

- November 4, 1952

Nominee	Dwight D. Eisenhower	Adlai Stevenson
Party	Republican	Democratic
Home state	New York	Illinois
Running mate	Richard Nixon	John Sparkman
Electoral vote	13	0
Popular vote	959,429	929,830
Percentage	50.71%	49.14%
County results
Eisenhower
50–60%
60–70%
70–80%
80–90%
Stevenson
50–60%
60–70%
70–80%
President before election
Harry S. Truman
Democratic
Elected President
Dwight D. Eisenhower
Republican

The 1952 United States presidential election in Missouri took place on November 4, 1952, as part of the 1952 United States presidential election. Voters chose 13 representatives, or electors, to the Electoral College, who voted for president and vice president.

Missouri was won by Columbia University President Dwight D. Eisenhower (R–New York), running with Senator Richard Nixon, with 50.71 percent of the popular vote, against Adlai Stevenson (D–Illinois), running with Senator John Sparkman, with 49.14 percent of the popular vote.

Missouri weighed in for this election as slightly over 9 points more Democratic than the nation-at-large. It would become the only state which Eisenhower won in 1952 but would flip to Stevenson four years later. It is the only occasion where Missouri voted for a Republican Presidential candidate between 1928 and 1968.

== Results ==
1952 United States presidential election in Missouri
Party	Candidate	Votes	%
Republican	Dwight D. Eisenhower	959,429	50.71%
Democratic	Adlai Stevenson	929,830	49.14%
Progressive	Vincent Hallinan	987	0.05%
Prohibition	Stuart Hamblen	885	0.05%
Constitution	Douglas MacArthur	535	0.03%
Socialist	Darlington Hoopes	227	0.01%
Socialist Labor	Eric Hass	169	0.01%
Total votes		1,892,062	100%

=== Results by county ===
County	Dwight D. Eisenhower Republican		Adlai Stevenson Democratic		Various candidates Other parties		Margin		Total votes cast
County	#	%	#	%	#	%	#	%	Total votes cast
Adair	5,748	63.03%	3,339	36.61%	33	0.36%	2,409	26.42%	9,120
Andrew	4,452	67.85%	2,104	32.06%	6	0.09%	2,348	35.79%	6,562
Atchison	3,259	61.53%	2,028	38.29%	10	0.19%	1,231	23.24%	5,297
Audrain	4,767	41.26%	6,775	58.64%	12	0.10%	-2,008	-17.38%	11,554
Barry	6,664	61.77%	4,124	38.23%	0	0.00%	2,540	23.54%	10,788
Barton	4,056	60.17%	2,661	39.47%	24	0.36%	1,395	20.70%	6,741
Bates	6,002	60.03%	3,995	39.95%	2	0.02%	2,007	20.08%	9,999
Benton	3,470	72.31%	1,303	27.15%	26	0.54%	2,167	45.16%	4,799
Bollinger	3,060	58.35%	2,182	41.61%	2	0.04%	878	16.74%	5,244
Boone	7,545	42.42%	10,206	57.39%	34	0.19%	-2,661	-14.97%	17,785
Buchanan	22,087	52.61%	19,854	47.29%	44	0.10%	2,233	5.32%	41,985
Butler	7,843	54.90%	6,426	44.98%	16	0.11%	1,417	9.92%	14,285
Caldwell	3,755	66.83%	1,860	33.10%	4	0.07%	1,895	33.73%	5,619
Callaway	3,818	40.96%	5,484	58.83%	19	0.20%	-1,666	-17.87%	9,321
Camden	2,789	69.29%	1,226	30.46%	10	0.25%	1,563	38.83%	4,025
Cape Girardeau	10,729	57.42%	7,933	42.46%	22	0.12%	2,796	14.96%	18,684
Carroll	5,410	63.14%	3,146	36.72%	12	0.14%	2,264	26.42%	8,568
Carter	1,100	49.48%	1,123	50.52%	0	0.00%	-23	-1.04%	2,223
Cass	6,000	54.04%	5,089	45.84%	13	0.12%	911	8.20%	11,102
Cedar	3,814	71.71%	1,483	27.88%	22	0.41%	2,331	43.83%	5,319
Chariton	3,883	50.91%	3,730	48.91%	14	0.18%	153	2.00%	7,627
Christian	4,440	76.24%	1,374	23.59%	10	0.17%	3,066	52.65%	5,824
Clark	2,850	57.95%	2,045	41.58%	23	0.47%	805	16.37%	4,918
Clay	13,043	50.95%	12,502	48.84%	53	0.21%	541	2.11%	25,598
Clinton	3,685	54.66%	3,048	45.21%	9	0.13%	637	9.45%	6,742
Cole	9,700	56.36%	7,507	43.62%	3	0.02%	2,193	12.74%	17,210
Cooper	5,208	59.90%	3,475	39.97%	12	0.14%	1,733	19.93%	8,695
Crawford	3,753	60.34%	2,453	39.44%	14	0.23%	1,300	20.90%	6,220
Dade	3,395	71.52%	1,340	28.23%	12	0.25%	2,055	43.29%	4,747
Dallas	3,459	73.19%	1,258	26.62%	9	0.19%	2,201	46.57%	4,726
Daviess	3,845	61.21%	2,424	38.59%	13	0.21%	1,421	22.62%	6,282
DeKalb	3,073	63.28%	1,773	36.51%	10	0.21%	1,300	26.77%	4,856
Dent	2,755	50.12%	2,738	49.81%	4	0.07%	17	0.31%	5,497
Douglas	4,051	81.49%	909	18.29%	11	0.22%	3,142	63.20%	4,971
Dunklin	5,400	36.18%	9,515	63.76%	9	0.06%	-4,115	-27.58%	14,924
Franklin	11,367	56.82%	8,610	43.04%	27	0.13%	2,757	13.78%	20,004
Gasconade	5,339	80.49%	1,285	19.37%	9	0.14%	4,054	61.12%	6,633
Gentry	3,429	57.76%	2,508	42.24%	0	0.00%	921	15.52%	5,937
Greene	29,673	60.57%	19,234	39.26%	81	0.17%	10,439	21.31%	48,988
Grundy	4,790	63.40%	2,747	36.36%	18	0.24%	2,043	27.04%	7,555
Harrison	5,191	69.54%	2,261	30.29%	13	0.17%	2,930	39.25%	7,465
Henry	6,628	59.07%	4,576	40.78%	16	0.14%	2,052	18.29%	11,220
Hickory	2,054	76.47%	622	23.16%	10	0.37%	1,432	53.31%	2,686
Holt	3,476	69.73%	1,487	29.83%	22	0.44%	1,989	39.90%	4,985
Howard	2,340	39.12%	3,635	60.77%	7	0.12%	-1,295	-21.65%	5,982
Howell	6,608	66.19%	3,349	33.55%	26	0.26%	3,259	32.64%	9,983
Iron	1,831	44.40%	2,286	55.43%	7	0.17%	-455	-11.03%	4,124
Jackson	133,093	48.88%	138,792	50.97%	412	0.15%	-5,699	-2.09%	272,297
Jasper	23,065	61.00%	14,665	38.78%	82	0.22%	8,400	22.22%	37,812
Jefferson	9,607	42.82%	12,808	57.08%	22	0.10%	-3,201	-14.26%	22,437
Johnson	6,990	61.82%	4,294	37.98%	23	0.20%	2,696	23.84%	11,307
Knox	2,229	52.77%	1,988	47.06%	7	0.17%	241	5.71%	4,224
Laclede	5,312	65.14%	2,839	34.81%	4	0.05%	2,473	30.33%	8,155
Lafayette	8,805	59.26%	6,020	40.52%	32	0.22%	2,785	18.74%	14,857
Lawrence	8,029	65.30%	4,232	34.42%	34	0.28%	3,797	30.88%	12,295
Lewis	2,416	45.41%	2,896	54.44%	8	0.15%	-480	-9.03%	5,320
Lincoln	3,458	46.19%	4,020	53.69%	9	0.12%	-562	-7.50%	7,487
Linn	5,551	51.63%	5,189	48.27%	11	0.10%	362	3.36%	10,751
Livingston	5,594	59.77%	3,757	40.14%	8	0.09%	1,837	19.63%	9,359
Macon	5,537	54.66%	4,577	45.19%	15	0.15%	960	9.47%	10,129
Madison	2,676	52.98%	2,375	47.02%	0	0.00%	301	5.96%	5,051
Maries	1,501	45.62%	1,783	54.19%	6	0.18%	-282	-8.57%	3,290
Marion	6,162	42.10%	8,457	57.78%	18	0.12%	-2,295	-15.68%	14,637
McDonald	4,121	61.90%	2,525	37.93%	11	0.17%	1,596	23.97%	6,657
Mercer	2,482	72.40%	936	27.30%	10	0.29%	1,546	45.10%	3,428
Miller	4,237	63.42%	2,426	36.31%	18	0.27%	1,811	27.11%	6,681
Mississippi	2,380	35.36%	4,331	64.35%	19	0.28%	-1,951	-28.99%	6,730
Moniteau	3,658	60.15%	2,416	39.73%	7	0.12%	1,242	20.42%	6,081
Monroe	1,488	23.77%	4,760	76.05%	11	0.18%	-3,272	-52.28%	6,259
Montgomery	3,670	56.37%	2,835	43.55%	5	0.08%	835	12.82%	6,510
Morgan	3,390	65.86%	1,750	34.00%	7	0.14%	1,640	31.86%	5,147
New Madrid	3,809	30.89%	8,504	68.98%	16	0.13%	-4,695	-38.09%	12,329
Newton	8,577	62.71%	5,070	37.07%	30	0.22%	3,507	25.64%	13,677
Nodaway	7,614	61.20%	4,805	38.62%	22	0.18%	2,809	22.58%	12,441
Oregon	1,804	38.03%	2,926	61.68%	14	0.30%	-1,122	-23.65%	4,744
Osage	3,404	60.73%	2,191	39.09%	10	0.18%	1,213	21.64%	5,605
Ozark	2,572	77.73%	734	22.18%	3	0.09%	1,838	55.55%	3,309
Pemiscot	4,118	31.57%	8,913	68.34%	12	0.09%	-4,795	-36.77%	13,043
Perry	4,633	66.57%	2,324	33.39%	3	0.04%	2,309	33.18%	6,960
Pettis	9,261	55.67%	7,363	44.26%	12	0.07%	1,898	11.41%	16,636
Phelps	4,694	49.13%	4,846	50.72%	14	0.15%	-152	-1.59%	9,554
Pike	3,836	45.47%	4,582	54.31%	18	0.21%	-746	-8.84%	8,436
Platte	3,390	42.36%	4,604	57.53%	9	0.11%	-1,214	-15.17%	8,003
Polk	5,263	67.81%	2,474	31.88%	24	0.31%	2,789	35.93%	7,761
Pulaski	2,678	46.88%	3,026	52.98%	8	0.14%	-348	-6.10%	5,712
Putnam	3,202	73.31%	1,149	26.30%	17	0.39%	2,053	47.01%	4,368
Ralls	1,437	32.18%	3,020	67.64%	8	0.18%	-1,583	-35.46%	4,465
Randolph	3,968	34.52%	7,501	65.25%	27	0.23%	-3,533	-30.73%	11,496
Ray	3,349	40.64%	4,869	59.09%	22	0.27%	-1,520	-18.45%	8,240
Reynolds	949	30.82%	2,124	68.98%	6	0.19%	-1,175	-38.16%	3,079
Ripley	2,444	52.56%	2,194	47.18%	12	0.26%	250	5.38%	4,650
St. Charles	8,451	56.48%	6,493	43.39%	20	0.13%	1,958	13.09%	14,964
St. Clair	3,465	64.17%	1,914	35.44%	21	0.39%	1,551	28.73%	5,400
St. Francois	9,672	54.55%	8,040	45.35%	17	0.10%	1,632	9.20%	17,729
St. Louis	116,821	54.98%	95,457	44.93%	202	0.10%	21,364	10.05%	212,480
St. Louis City	144,828	38.00%	235,893	61.89%	427	0.11%	-91,065	-23.89%	381,148
Ste. Genevieve	2,682	52.91%	2,385	47.05%	2	0.04%	297	5.86%	5,069
Saline	6,926	52.19%	6,318	47.61%	27	0.20%	608	4.58%	13,271
Schuyler	1,636	49.23%	1,680	50.56%	7	0.21%	-44	-1.33%	3,323
Scotland	2,123	50.24%	2,093	49.53%	10	0.24%	30	0.71%	4,226
Scott	4,661	39.45%	7,127	60.33%	26	0.22%	-2,466	-20.88%	11,814
Shannon	1,291	38.80%	2,028	60.96%	8	0.24%	-737	-22.16%	3,327
Shelby	2,163	39.88%	3,237	59.68%	24	0.44%	-1,074	-19.80%	5,424
Stoddard	5,514	47.33%	6,110	52.45%	25	0.21%	-596	-5.12%	11,649
Stone	3,172	80.69%	748	19.03%	11	0.28%	2,424	61.66%	3,931
Sullivan	3,746	55.15%	3,041	44.77%	5	0.07%	705	10.38%	6,792
Taney	3,037	73.22%	1,099	26.49%	12	0.29%	1,938	46.73%	4,148
Texas	4,824	52.29%	4,372	47.39%	29	0.31%	452	4.90%	9,225
Vernon	5,924	56.92%	4,450	42.76%	34	0.33%	1,474	14.16%	10,408
Warren	2,977	72.66%	1,112	27.14%	8	0.20%	1,865	45.52%	4,097
Washington	3,338	55.33%	2,684	44.49%	11	0.18%	654	10.84%	6,033
Wayne	2,423	49.08%	2,500	50.64%	14	0.28%	-77	-1.56%	4,937
Webster	4,701	61.73%	2,894	38.00%	20	0.26%	1,807	23.73%	7,615
Worth	1,682	57.72%	1,227	42.11%	5	0.17%	455	15.61%	2,914
Wright	5,285	72.31%	2,006	27.45%	18	0.25%	3,279	44.86%	7,309
Totals	959,429	50.71%	929,830	49.14%	2,803	0.15%	29,599	1.57%	1,892,062

==== Counties that flipped from Democratic to Republican ====
- Adair
- Atchison
- Barton
- Bates
- Buchanan
- Butler
- Cape Girardeau
- Cass
- Chariton
- Clark
- Clay
- Clinton
- Cole
- Daviess
- Dent
- Franklin
- Gentry
- Greene
- Henry
- Jasper
- Knox
- Linn
- Livingston
- Macon
- Madison
- Moniteau
- Nodaway
- Osage
- Pettis
- Ripley
- St. Charles
- St. Francois
- Ste. Genevieve
- Saline
- Scotland
- Sullivan
- Texas
- Vernon
- Washington
- Worth

== See also ==
- United States presidential elections in Missouri
