= Sticklerville, Missouri =

Unincorporated community in Missouri, U.S.

Coordinates: 40°09′38″N 92°53′38″W

Sticklerville is an unincorporated community in Sullivan County, in the U.S. state of Missouri.

The community is on Missouri Route H two miles west of Mystic and Missouri Route 129. Mussel Fork flows past the east side of the community.

== History ==
Sticklerville was platted in 1865, and named after Henry Stickler, a local merchant. A post office called Sticklerville was established in 1864, and remained in operation until 1907.
