= Greencastle, Missouri =

- City
- Location of Greencastle, Missouri
- Coordinates: 40°15′38″N 92°52′42″W
- Country: United States
- State: Missouri
- County: Sullivan

Area
  - Total: 0.45 sq mi (1.17 km^{2})
  - Land: 0.45 sq mi (1.16 km^{2})
  - Water: 0.0039 sq mi (0.01 km^{2})
- Elevation: 1,047 ft (319 m)

Population (2020)
  - Total: 224
  - Density: 501.2/sq mi (193.52/km^{2})
- Time zone: UTC-6 (Central (CST))
  - Summer (DST): UTC-5 (CDT)
- ZIP code: 63544
- Area code: 660
- FIPS code: 29-29116
- GNIS feature ID: 2394981

Greencastle is a city in eastern Sullivan County, Missouri, United States. The population was 224 at the 2020 census.

== History ==
Part of the Greencastle business district in the 1890s.

The plat for Greencastle was surveyed on March 12, 1857, at the behest of Victor Doze, Marion Overstreet, E.E. Prindle, I.E. Wood, and M.P. Wood. It consisted of six full blocks and eight half blocks with each block containing eight lots. The area had been inhabited for some time prior to 1857 however, with the first permanent home built on the present site of Greencastle by Marion Sanders circa 1853. Moreover, the Greencastle Methodist Episcopal Church was organized in 1845 and held services just south of the town's later platted location.

The Greencastle post office was established in 1857 with I.E. Wood as first postmaster, followed a short time later by the opening of the new towns' first general store. Greencastle's first Gristmill was built in 1879 and a newspaper, the Greencastle Independence began publication in 1881. It was also in 1881 that Greencastle was finally incorporated on August 8, 1881. A depot for the Quincy, Missouri, and Pacific Railroad was built in 1883. A creamery was established in 1885 and produced an average of 1,500 pounds of butter per week.

== Geography ==
Greencastle is located on Missouri Route 6 approximately 13 miles east-northeast of Milan and 15 miles west of Kirksville.

Mussel Fork flows past approximately one mile to the southwest and the Union Ridge Conservation Area on Spring Creek is two miles north on Missouri Route D.

According to the United States Census Bureau, the city has a total area of 0.45 square miles (1.17 km^{2}), all land.

== Demographics ==
Historical population
Census	Pop.	Note	%±
1880	191		—
1890	267		39.8%
1900	390		46.1%
1910	454		16.4%
1920	487		7.3%
1930	376		−22.8%
1940	342		−9.0%
1950	287		−16.1%
1960	250		−12.9%
1970	235		−6.0%
1980	285		21.3%
1990	254		−10.9%
2000	308		21.3%
2010	275		−10.7%
2020	224		−18.5%
U.S. Decennial Census

=== 2010 census ===
As of the census of 2010, there were 275 people, 123 households, and 71 families residing in the city. The population density was 611.1 inhabitants per square mile (235.9/km^{2}). There were 147 housing units at an average density of 326.7 per square mile (126.1/km^{2}). The racial makeup of the city was 99.6% White and 0.4% from two or more races. Hispanic or Latino of any race were 1.5% of the population.

There were 123 households, of which 27.6% had children under the age of 18 living with them, 42.3% were married couples living together, 11.4% had a female householder with no husband present, 4.1% had a male householder with no wife present, and 42.3% were non-families. 39.0% of all households were made up of individuals, and 24.4% had someone living alone who was 65 years of age or older. The average household size was 2.24 and the average family size was 3.03.

The median age in the city was 44.1 years. 23.3% of residents were under the age of 18; 8.8% were between the ages of 18 and 24; 19.6% were from 25 to 44; 25.9% were from 45 to 64; and 22.5% were 65 years of age or older. The gender makeup of the city was 48.0% male and 52.0% female.

=== 2000 census ===
As of the census of 2000, there were 308 people, 133 households, and 75 families residing in the city. The population density was 673.4 inhabitants per square mile (260.0/km^{2}). There were 148 housing units at an average density of 323.6 per square mile (124.9/km^{2}). The racial makeup of the city was 99.68% White and 0.32% Native American.

There were 133 households, out of which 28.6% had children under the age of 18 living with them, 47.4% were married couples living together, 6.0% had a female householder with no husband present, and 42.9% were non-families. 40.6% of all households were made up of individuals, and 18.8% had someone living alone who was 65 years of age or older. The average household size was 2.32 and the average family size was 3.17.

In the city the population was spread out, with 28.9% under the age of 18, 4.9% from 18 to 24, 26.0% from 25 to 44, 24.7% from 45 to 64, and 15.6% who were 65 years of age or older. The median age was 37 years. For every 100 females, there were 85.5 males. For every 100 females age 18 and over, there were 90.4 males.

The median income for a household in the city was $17,500, and the median income for a family was $23,438. Males had a median income of $21,042 versus $18,625 for females. The per capita income for the city was $10,369. About 19.5% of families and 27.1% of the population were below the poverty line, including 22.6% of those under the age of eighteen and 33.3% of those 65 or over.
