= Penn Township, Sullivan County, Missouri =

Township in the U.S. state of Missouri

Coordinates: 40.2553°N 92.9450°W

Penn Township is a township in Sullivan County, in the U.S. state of Missouri.

Penn Township most likely was named after the local Penn family.
