= Humphreys, Missouri =

- Village
- Location of Humphreys, Missouri
- Coordinates: 40°07′31″N 93°19′10″W
- Country: United States
- State: Missouri
- County: Sullivan

Government
  - President: Caleb Cagle
  - Vice President: Bryan Adams

Area
  - Total: 0.25 sq mi (0.65 km^{2})
  - Land: 0.25 sq mi (0.65 km^{2})
  - Water: 0.0039 sq mi (0.01 km^{2})
- Elevation: 929 ft (283 m)

Population (2020)
  - Total: 89
  - Density: 357.0/sq mi (137.82/km^{2})
- Time zone: UTC-6 (Central (CST))
  - Summer (DST): UTC-5 (CDT)
- ZIP code: 64646
- Area code: 660
- FIPS code: 29-33742
- GNIS feature ID: 2398561

Humphreys is a village in southwest Sullivan County, Missouri, United States. The population was 89 at the 2020 census.

== Geography ==
Humphreys is located in southwestern Sullivan County. The community is at the intersection of Missouri State Routes 6 and 139. The community of Galt is about four miles to the west in Grundy County. Medicine Creek flows past about three miles to the west and Muddy Creek flows past the east side of the community.

According to the United States Census Bureau, the village has a total area of 0.25 square miles (0.65 km^{2}), all land.

== History ==
Humphreys, originally known as Haley City, was first surveyed in April 1881 by G.M. Garvey for the Stringer family. When originally established, it consisted of just seventeen blocks with 246 lots. Additions of three blocks and nine blocks were made in January and May 1882, respectively. It was sometime during that spring of 1882 that the town name was changed to Humphreys. The town experienced rapid early growth, being located on the Quincy, Missouri & Pacific Railroad, with the train depot being constructed in August 1881. James Stringer established the first store in June 1881, and by the end of the year the new town supported four hotels, two drug stores, two dry goods stores, a general merchandise, and a millinery. A harness shop joined the business list in 1884 and blacksmiths in 1886 and 1887.

Light industry of a sort came to Humphreys in 1882 with the establishment of the Humphreys Milling Company, a steam-powered flour mill located in a large three-story building. It was said to have produced up to twenty-five barrels of flour per day at peak capacity. The citizenry's need for news was met by the Humphreys Gazette, a weekly newspaper founded in late 1881 by Joseph S. Wright. The name was changed to the Humphreys Advance in 1884 but the venture ultimately proved unprofitable and publication ceased in August 1887.

=== Education ===
Humphreys College & Business Institute as sketched in 1887.

The children of Humphreys were educated in a typical one-room rural schoolhouse, located about three-fourths of a mile northwest of the community until 1885. At that time, the elementary and secondary education were combined with and housed in the building containing the Humphreys College and Business Institute. The College was established in 1884 on four acres of land donated by James M. Stringer. A large two-story brick structure was constructed between June and September 1884, with the first class admission beginning on September 29 of the aforementioned year. Humphreys College was co-education and offered two course tracks of study—preparatory and collegiate, with a reported enrollment in 1887 of 157 students. No dormitories were constructed; however, ample housing was available in the town's hotels and private homes. Humphreys College and Business Institute was completely destroyed by fire on April 8, 1893.

== Humphreys today ==
Humphreys is largely a "bedroom community" today with little if any businesses. Most citizens must travel to larger cities in the region such as Milan, Trenton, Brookfield and Kirksville for employment. After a population low of 98 in 1990, the town rebounded in 2000 with 164 citizens. Presently, children from Humphreys attend Grundy County R-5 school in Galt. The two small towns merged their schools in 1966 to create the new district. On July 26, 2011, the United States Postal Service announced plans to permanently close the Humphreys post office as part of a nationwide restructuring plan. No official date for closing has yet been announced. Humphreys' first post office was established in 1881 and has been in continuous operation since.

== Demographics ==
Historical population
Census	Pop.	Note	%±
1890	450		—
1900	393		−12.7%
1910	292		−25.7%
1920	359		22.9%
1930	249		−30.6%
1940	247		−0.8%
1950	185		−25.1%
1960	163		−11.9%
1970	140		−14.1%
1980	133		−5.0%
1990	98		−26.3%
2000	164		67.3%
2010	118		−28.0%
2020	89		−24.6%
U.S. Decennial Census

=== 2010 census ===
As of the census of 2010, there were 118 people, 49 households, and 27 families residing in the village. The population density was 472.0 inhabitants per square mile (182.2/km^{2}). There were 59 housing units at an average density of 236.0 per square mile (91.1/km^{2}). The racial makeup of the village was 98.3% White and 1.7% from two or more races. Hispanic or Latino of any race were 0.8% of the population.

There were 49 households, of which 28.6% had children under the age of 18 living with them, 40.8% were married couples living together, 12.2% had a female householder with no husband present, 2.0% had a male householder with no wife present, and 44.9% were non-families. 40.8% of all households were made up of individuals, and 4.1% had someone living alone who was 65 years of age or older. The average household size was 2.41 and the average family size was 3.37.

The median age in the village was 36.5 years. 25.4% of residents were under the age of 18; 8.4% were between the ages of 18 and 24; 21.2% were from 25 to 44; 31.3% were from 45 to 64; and 13.6% were 65 years of age or older. The gender makeup of the village was 52.5% male and 47.5% female.

=== 2000 census ===
As of the census of 2000, there were 164 people, 62 households, and 40 families residing in the village. The population density was 639.5 inhabitants per square mile (246.9/km^{2}). There were 68 housing units at an average density of 265.1 per square mile (102.4/km^{2}). The racial makeup of the village was 95.73% White, 1.22% Native American, 0.61% Asian, and 2.44% from two or more races. Hispanic or Latino of any race were 5.49% of the population.

There were 62 households, out of which 33.9% had children under the age of 18 living with them, 41.9% were married couples living together, 14.5% had a female householder with no husband present, and 33.9% were non-families. 30.6% of all households were made up of individuals, and 12.9% had someone living alone who was 65 years of age or older. The average household size was 2.65 and the average family size was 3.22.

In the village, the population was spread out, with 29.9% under the age of 18, 13.4% from 18 to 24, 26.2% from 25 to 44, 15.9% from 45 to 64, and 14.6% who were 65 years of age or older. The median age was 32 years. For every 100 females, there were 115.8 males. For every 100 females age 18 and over, there were 101.8 males.

The median income for a household in the village was $25,250, and the median income for a family was $27,500. Males had a median income of $22,188 versus $21,667 for females. The per capita income for the village was $16,207. About 17.3% of families and 25.1% of the population were below the poverty line, including 37.1% of those under the age of eighteen and 14.8% of those 65 or over.
