= Newtown, Missouri =

- City
- Location of Newtown, Missouri
- Coordinates: 40°22′33″N 93°20′01″W
- Country: United States
- State: Missouri
- County: Sullivan

Area
  - Total: 0.25 sq mi (0.66 km^{2})
  - Land: 0.25 sq mi (0.65 km^{2})
  - Water: 0.0039 sq mi (0.01 km^{2})
- Elevation: 915 ft (279 m)

Population (2020)
  - Total: 113
  - Density: 447.4/sq mi (172.74/km^{2})
- Time zone: UTC-6 (Central (CST))
  - Summer (DST): UTC-5 (CDT)
- ZIP code: 64667
- Area code: 660
- FIPS code: 29-52328
- GNIS feature ID: 2396816

Newtown is a city in Sullivan County, Missouri, United States. The population was 113 at the 2020 census.

== History ==
Newtown was platted in 1858. A post office called Newtown has been in operation since 1887.

== Geography ==
Newtown is located in the northwest corner of Sullivan County along Missouri Route 139 and just to the west of Medicine Creek. The community of Harris is approximately 4.5 miles to the south and Lucerne is six miles to the north in Putnam County. The Chicago, Milwaukee, St. Paul and Pacific Railroad passes the east side of the location.

According to the United States Census Bureau, the city has a total area of 0.25 square miles (0.65 km^{2}), all land.

== Demographics ==
Historical population
Census	Pop.	Note	%±
1880	24		—
1890	303		1,162.5%
1900	291		−4.0%
1910	261		−10.3%
1920	408		56.3%
1930	284		−30.4%
1940	285		0.4%
1950	231		−18.9%
1960	265		14.7%
1970	211		−20.4%
1980	170		−19.4%
1990	115		−32.4%
2000	209		81.7%
2010	183		−12.4%
2020	113		−38.3%
U.S. Decennial Census

=== 2010 census ===
As of the census of 2010, there were 183 people, 74 households, and 49 families residing in the city. The population density was 732.0 inhabitants per square mile (282.6/km^{2}). There were 89 housing units at an average density of 356.0 per square mile (137.5/km^{2}). The racial makeup of the city was 85.2% White, 7.7% Native American, 3.3% from other races, and 3.8% from two or more races. Hispanic or Latino of any race were 9.8% of the population.

There were 74 households, of which 35.1% had children under the age of 18 living with them, 43.2% were married couples living together, 14.9% had a female householder with no husband present, 8.1% had a male householder with no wife present, and 33.8% were non-families. 32.4% of all households were made up of individuals, and 12.2% had someone living alone who was 65 years of age or older. The average household size was 2.47 and the average family size was 3.04.

The median age in the city was 36.2 years. 31.7% of residents were under the age of 18; 8.2% were between the ages of 18 and 24; 23% were from 25 to 44; 26.8% were from 45 to 64; and 10.4% were 65 years of age or older. The gender makeup of the city was 55.7% male and 44.3% female.

=== 2000 census ===
As of the census of 2000, there were 209 people, 86 households, and 55 families residing in the town. The population density was 826.0 inhabitants per square mile (318.9/km^{2}). There were 93 housing units at an average density of 367.5 per square mile (141.9/km^{2}). The racial makeup of the town was 98.56% White, 0.48% Native American, 0.48% from other races, and 0.48% from two or more races. Hispanic or Latino of any race were 4.31% of the population.

There were 86 households, out of which 36.0% had children under the age of 18 living with them, 50.0% were married couples living together, 9.3% had a female householder with no husband present, and 36.0% were non-families. 33.7% of all households were made up of individuals, and 14.0% had someone living alone who was 65 years of age or older. The average household size was 2.43 and the average family size was 3.16.

In the town the population was spread out, with 32.1% under the age of 18, 9.1% from 18 to 24, 26.3% from 25 to 44, 17.7% from 45 to 64, and 14.8% who were 65 years of age or older. The median age was 32 years. For every 100 females, there were 91.7 males. For every 100 females age 18 and over, there were 86.8 males.

The median income for a household in the town was $21,250, and the median income for a family was $43,125. Males had a median income of $23,000 versus $19,625 for females. The per capita income for the town was $13,561. About 3.2% of families and 10.6% of the population were below the poverty line, including 7.8% of those under the age of eighteen and 25.5% of those 65 or over.
