= Morris Township, Sullivan County, Missouri =

Township in the U.S. state of Missouri

Coordinates: 40.0792°N 92.9333°W

Morris Township is a township in Sullivan County, in the U.S. state of Missouri.

Morris Township was erected in 1845, taking its name from Roberson Morris, an early citizen.
