= Osgood, Missouri =

- Village
- Location of Osgood, Missouri
- Coordinates: 40°11′50″N 93°21′00″W
- Country: United States
- State: Missouri
- County: Sullivan

Area
  - Total: 0.18 sq mi (0.47 km^{2})
  - Land: 0.18 sq mi (0.47 km^{2})
  - Water: 0 sq mi (0.00 km^{2})
- Elevation: 817 ft (249 m)

Population (2020)
  - Total: 14
  - Density: 131.9/sq mi (50.93/km^{2})
- Time zone: UTC-6 (Central (CST))
  - Summer (DST): UTC-5 (CDT)
- FIPS code: 29-55424
- GNIS feature ID: 2399591

Osgood is a village in western Sullivan County, Missouri, United States. The population was 24 at the 2020 census.

== History ==
Osgood was platted in 1886. and most likely named after a railroad man. A post office called Osgood was established in 1888, and remained in operation until 1965.

== Geography ==
Osgood is located in western Sullivan County on Missouri Route 139 just west of Medicine Creek. Milan is 13 miles to the east along Missouri Route PP. Harris and Humphreys lie to the north and south respectively along Route 139. The Chicago, Milwaukee, St. Paul and Pacific Railroad passes the east side of the location.

According to the United States Census Bureau, the village has a total area of 0.18 square miles (0.47 km^{2}), all land.

== Demographics ==
Historical population
Census	Pop.	Note	%±
1910	204		—
1920	272		33.3%
1930	206		−24.3%
1940	183		−11.2%
1950	173		−5.5%
1960	135		−22.0%
1970	108		−20.0%
1980	93		−13.9%
1990	53		−43.0%
2000	51		−3.8%
2010	48		−5.9%
2020	24		−50.0%
U.S. Decennial Census

=== 2010 census ===
As of the census of 2010, there were 48 people, 19 households, and 11 families living in the village. The population density was 266.7 inhabitants per square mile (103.0/km^{2}). There were 31 housing units at an average density of 172.2 per square mile (66.5/km^{2}). The racial makeup of the village was 64.6% White, 14.6% Native American, 18.8% from other races, and 2.1% from two or more races. Hispanic or Latino of any race were 20.8% of the population.

There were 19 households, of which 21.1% had children under the age of 18 living with them, 26.3% were married couples living together, 15.8% had a female householder with no husband present, 15.8% had a male householder with no wife present, and 42.1% were non-families. 42.1% of all households were made up of individuals, and 15.8% had someone living alone who was 65 years of age or older. The average household size was 2.53 and the average family size was 3.18.

The median age in the village was 37 years. 22.9% of residents were under the age of 18; 8.4% were between the ages of 18 and 24; 33.4% were from 25 to 44; 23% were from 45 to 64; and 12.5% were 65 years of age or older. The gender makeup of the village was 52.1% male and 47.9% female.

=== 2000 census ===
As of the census of 2000, there were 51 people, 20 households, and 14 families living in the village. The population density was 277.0 inhabitants per square mile (107.0/km^{2}). There were 26 housing units at an average density of 141.2 per square mile (54.5/km^{2}). The racial makeup of the village was 94.12% White, 3.92% African American, 1.96% from other races. Hispanic or Latino of any race were 1.96% of the population.

There were 20 households, out of which 45.0% had children under the age of 18 living with them, 45.0% were married couples living together, 25.0% had a female householder with no husband present, and 30.0% were non-families. 20.0% of all households were made up of individuals, and 20.0% had someone living alone who was 65 years of age or older. The average household size was 2.55 and the average family size was 2.93.

In the village, the population was spread out, with 35.3% under the age of 18, 5.9% from 18 to 24, 27.5% from 25 to 44, 13.7% from 45 to 64, and 17.6% who were 65 years of age or older. The median age was 36 years. For every 100 females, there were 88.9 males. For every 100 females age 18 and over, there were 65.0 males.

The median income for a household in the village was $14,250, and the median income for a family was $32,917. Males had a median income of $23,750 versus $17,500 for females. The per capita income for the village was $8,889. None of the population and none of the families were below the poverty line.
