= Duncan Township, Sullivan County, Missouri =

Township in Sullivan County, Missouri, U.S.

Coordinates: 40.0889°N 93.1667°W

Duncan Township is a township in Sullivan County, in the U.S. state of Missouri.

Duncan Township was erected in 1839, deriving its name from David Duncanson, a pioneer settler.
