= Locust Creek (Grand River tributary) =

Stream in the U.S. states of Iowa and Missouri

Coordinates: 39°40′02″N 93°17′08″W

Locust Creek is a stream in Wayne County, Iowa and Chariton, Linn, Livingston, Putnam and Sullivan counties in Missouri. It is a tributary of the Grand River.

The stream headwaters arise in southeast Wayne County at an elevation of approximately 1080 feet and three miles west-southwest of Seymour, Iowa. It flows south into Putnam County, Missouri, and passes under US Route 136 six miles west of Unionville. It continues into Sullivan County passing three miles west of Pollock. It continues south roughly parallel to and west of Missouri Route 5 past the west side of Milan, through the Locust Creek Conservation Area and passing east of Reger. It enters Linn County just west of Browning. It flows south through Linn County passing the communities of Purdin, Linneus and Laclede. The stream turns to the southwest and enters Pershing State Park. The stream exits Linn County, and forms the boundary between Chariton and Livingston counties, and reaches its confluence with the Grand just west of the community of Sumner. The confluence is at an elevation of 640 feet. At Linneus, the creek has a mean annual discharge of 351 cubic feet per second.

Locust Creek was named for the black or honey locust timber lining its course.

== See also ==
- List of rivers of Iowa
- List of rivers of Missouri
