= Parsons, Missouri =

Unincorporated community in Missouri, U.S.

Coordinates: 40°04′43″N 93°16′19″W

Parsons is an unincorporated community in Sullivan County, in the U.S. state of Missouri.

== History ==
Early variant names were "Parson" and "Gath". A post office called Gath was established in 1881, the name was changed to Parson in 1881, and the post office closed in 1901. The present name is after Parson Creek.
