= Bairdston, Missouri =

Unincorporated community in Sullivan County, Missouri, United States

Coordinates: 40°17′05″N 93°11′46″W

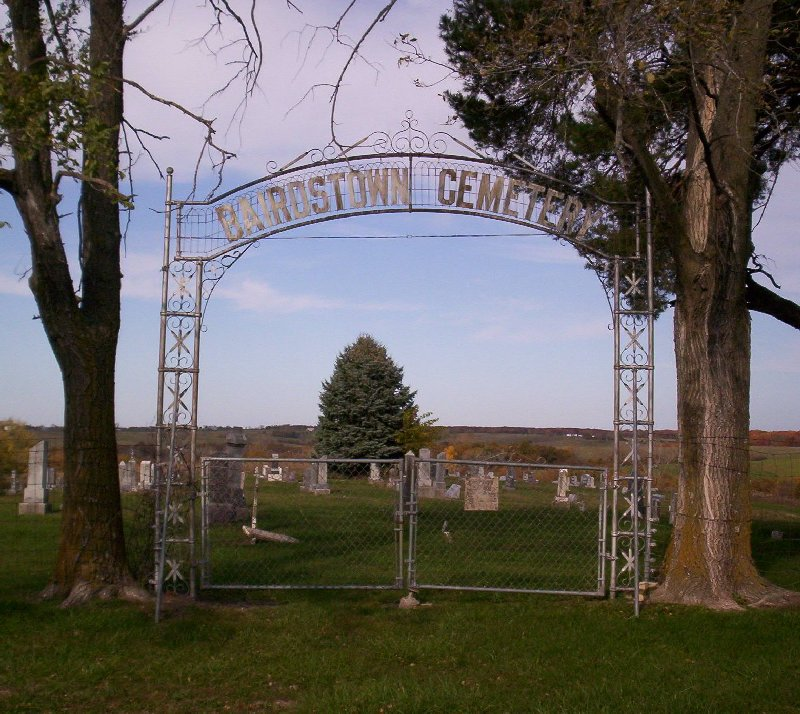
Bairdstown Cemetery, November 2007

Bairdston is an unincorporated community in Sullivan County, Missouri, United States.

The community is at the intersection of Missouri routes BB and OO approximately six miles northwest of Milan.

== History ==
A variant name was "Bairdstown". The community was platted in 1859 by Miles B. Baird, and named for him. A post office called Bairdstown was established in 1858, and remained in operation until 1903.
