= Medicine Creek (Missouri) =

River in Missouri, United States of America

Medicine Creek is a stream in Grundy, Livingston, Putnam, and Sullivan counties of the U.S. state of Missouri. It is a tributary to the Grand River.

The stream source is at the confluence of the East Fork Medicine Creek and Middle Fork Medicine Creek in northern Putnam County approximately 900 feet south of the Missouri-Iowa state line at 40°34′41″N 93°20′06″W and an elevation of 940 ft (290 m). The stream flows south passing the communities of Powersville and Lucerne in Putnam County. It passes under U.S. Route 136 just east of Lucerne. It enters western Sullivan County and flows past the communities of Newtown, Harris and Osgood where it veers to the southwest to enter Grundy County just to the east of Galt. It flows past the community of Laredo turning to the south and enters Livingston County. It continues to the south flowing under U.S. Route 36 to enter the Grand River northwest of the community of Bedford. At Laredo, the creek has a mean annual discharge of 293 cubic feet per second.

Medicine Creek was named for the fact that Native Americans sourced their natural medicine from herbs found along the streambanks.

== See also ==
- List of rivers of Missouri
