= Winigan, Missouri =

Census-designated place in Missouri, United States

- Census-Designated Place
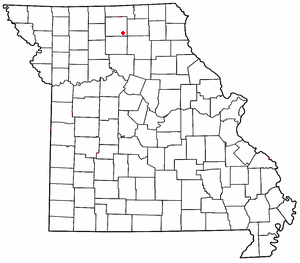
- Location of Winigan in Missouri
- Coordinates: 40°02′48″N 92°54′06″W
- Country: United States
- State: Missouri
- County: Sullivan

Area
  - Total: 0.50 sq mi (1.30 km^{2})
  - Land: 0.50 sq mi (1.29 km^{2})
  - Water: 0.0039 sq mi (0.01 km^{2})
- Elevation: 997 ft (304 m)

Population (2020)
  - Total: 37
  - Density: 74.2/sq mi (28.66/km^{2})
- FIPS code: 29-80440
- GNIS feature ID: 2587124

Winigan is an unincorporated community in southeastern Sullivan County, Missouri, United States. As of the 2020 census, Winigan had a population of 37. It is located on Missouri Route 129, approximately 15 mi (24 km) southeast of Milan. The Sullivan-Linn county line is one-half mile south of the community.

== History ==
The land upon which Winigan sits was obtained from the U.S. government in February 1857 by Noah Harl and exchanged hands five times before coming into the possession of James M. Thrasher. The town of Winigan was laid out in early February 1880, encompassing an area of six blocks on land belonging to Thrasher. A post office had been established in 1874 with Van Klelsie as the first postmaster. According to local folklore, the town was named in honor of a Mr. Winnegan, an early settler to southern Sullivan County who was killed by a panther in the 1840s. The first store was opened in 1878 and by 1888 Winigan had a population of 25 families. It was then, and remained for many years, dependent on supplying the needs of farms located in southeastern Sullivan County. At one time there were two dry goods stores, two blacksmith shops, a drug store and a combination steam sawmill/gristmill.

A large turkey farm and hatchery was owned and run by the Borron family near Winigan in the mid and late 1900s. For many years Winigan had one of the longest running community street fairs in north Missouri. It was held on the first weekend in August for over six decades. The highlight was the Winnigan Centennial in 1973, which drew a crowd of over 5,000. The Winigan Strawberry Festival is held each June and the Winigan 4-H Fair has been held each year since 1938.

Winigan has twice been the scene of a bank robbery. The first happened on December 19, 1945, as three armed men stole more than $6,000 at gunpoint from the Citizen's Bank of Winigan. Town merchant Ivan Cable helped foil the robbery by letting the air out of one of the getaway vehicle's tires; the robbers fled on foot but were later apprehended. Two were arrested, while the third killed himself by gunshot. The second robbery took place on July 2, 2009, as two men held up the Winigan branch of the Bank of Brookfield-Purdin, escaping with an undisclosed amount of cash. The pair were later caught and tried for a series of similar bank thefts.

== Demographics ==
Historical population
Census	Pop.	Note	%±
2020	37		—
U.S. Decennial Census

== Notable people ==
- Bud Houser, winner of three Olympic gold medals.
