= Pleasant Hill Township, Sullivan County, Missouri =

Township in Sullivan County, Missouri, U.S.

Coordinates: 40.0972°N 93.0653°W

Pleasant Hill Township is a township in Sullivan County, in the U.S. state of Missouri.

Pleasant Hill Township was erected in 1845.
