= Duncan Branch =

Stream in Cass County, Missouri, U.S.

Coordinates: 38.759454°N 94.238557°W

Duncan Branch is a stream in Cass County in the U.S. state of Missouri. It is a tributary of Big Creek.

Duncan Branch has the name of James L. Duncan, a pioneer settler.

== See also ==
- List of rivers of Missouri
