= Pollock, Missouri =

- Village
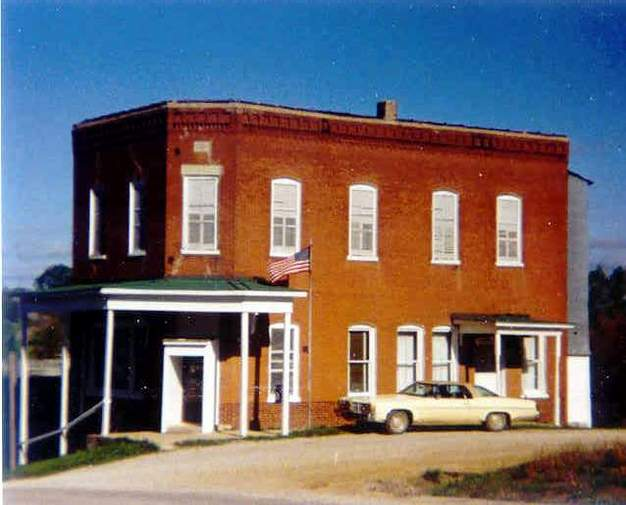
- Former U.S. Post Office in Pollock

- Location of Pollock, Missouri
- Coordinates: 40°21′30″N 93°05′01″W
- Country: United States
- State: Missouri
- County: Sullivan

Area
  - Total: 0.17 sq mi (0.43 km^{2})
  - Land: 0.17 sq mi (0.43 km^{2})
  - Water: 0 sq mi (0.00 km^{2})
- Elevation: 974 ft (297 m)

Population (2020)
  - Total: 46
  - Density: 277.2/sq mi (107.03/km^{2})
- Time zone: UTC-6 (Central (CST))
  - Summer (DST): UTC-5 (CDT)
- ZIP code: 63560
- Area code: 660
- FIPS code: 29-58898
- GNIS feature ID: 2398995

Pollock is a village in north central Sullivan County, Missouri, United States. The population was 46 at the 2020 census.

== History ==
Pollock was established in July 1873 by H.F. Warner and William Lane and originally consisted of thirty-two blocks. Another fourteen blocks, located south of the original, was added to the town plat in 1876 via Godfrey's Addition. By 1877 Pollock included two general stores, a drug store, blacksmith shop, one hotel, a schoolhouse and a small depot for the Burlington & Southwestern Railroad with a town population of one hundred, and a United States Post Office was established in Pollock in 1879. A major fire swept through a portion of the Pollock business district in January 1936. Three buildings—Rosenberry's Garage, Morlan General Store, and Anspach Cafe' -- were total losses, while buildings containing O.L. Casto's store and Miller's Store received major damage.
The Pollock community had a high school between 1923 and 1939. Class sizes were predictable small considering the towns population, with an average of ten students per class year. The smallest class was 1938 with only three graduates, while the largest was the Class of 1937 with thirteen diploma recipients. Due to economic conditions the junior and senior years were discontinued between 1932 and 1937, and students in those grades had to finish their education elsewhere, primarily Milan, which was readily accessible via rail. The Pollock high school closed for good following the 1939 graduation and all secondary students incorporated into the Milan school district. The elementary school continued a few years longer into the mid 1950s. Currently all children in the Pollock area attend classes in the Milan C-2 school district.

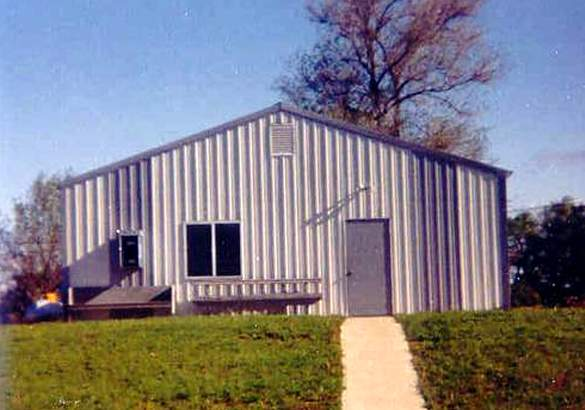
Pollock Community Center around 1994.

In the mid-1970s, not long after Pollock celebrated its centennial, eight new apartments—housed in two buildings—were constructed for use by the elderly. A new all-metal community building was constructed in the late 1980s, with an addition to the building to house the U.S. Post Office built in the late 1990s. Significant community support resulted in the building of a Pollock City Park around 1990. Residents William Casteel, Melvin Casto and Dick Stewart spearheaded a fundraising campaign and recruited volunteers from far and wide to acquire park equipment and prepare the grounds. Pollock suffered a significant blow on July 26, 2011, when the United States Postal Service announced plans to permanently close the Pollock post office as part of a nationwide restructuring plan. An earlier attempt in the late 1980s to close the Pollock post office was appealed and overturned with the help of U.S. Senator Kit Bond and other Missouri politicians.

== Geography ==
Pollock is located about two miles south of the Sullivan-Putnam county line. The community is on Missouri Route M approximately one mile east of Missouri Route 5. A section of the Burlington and Quincy Railroad passes the west side of the town.

According to the United States Census Bureau, the village has a total area of 0.17 square miles (0.44 km^{2}), all land.

== Demographics ==
Historical population
| Census | Pop. | Note | %± |
|---|---|---|---|
| 1880 | 104 | | — |
| 1980 | 102 | | — |
| 1990 | 66 | | −35.3% |
| 2000 | 131 | | 98.5% |
| 2010 | 89 | | −32.1% |
| 2020 | 46 | | −48.3% |
U.S. Decennial Census

=== 2010 census ===
As of the census of 2010, there were 89 people, 39 households, and 25 families residing in the village. The population density was 523.5 inhabitants per square mile (202.1/km^{2}). There were 49 housing units at an average density of 288.2 per square mile (111.3/km^{2}). The racial makeup of the village was 94.4% White, 1.1% African American, 3.4% from other races, and 1.1% from two or more races. Hispanic or Latino of any race were 6.7% of the population.

There were 39 households, of which 25.6% had children under the age of 18 living with them, 43.6% were married couples living together, 10.3% had a female householder with no husband present, 10.3% had a male householder with no wife present, and 35.9% were non-families. 33.3% of all households were made up of individuals, and 18% had someone living alone who was 65 years of age or older. The average household size was 2.28 and the average family size was 2.84.

The median age in the village was 43.5 years. 24.7% of residents were under the age of 18; 11.3% were between the ages of 18 and 24; 15.7% were from 25 to 44; 31.5% were from 45 to 64; and 16.9% were 65 years of age or older. The gender makeup of the village was 49.4% male and 50.6% female.

=== 2000 census ===
As of the census of 2000, there were 131 people, 54 households, and 36 families residing in the village. The population density was 786.8 inhabitants per square mile (303.8/km^{2}). There were 62 housing units at an average density of 372.4 per square mile (143.8/km^{2}). The racial makeup of the village was 99.24% White, 0.76% from other races. Hispanic or Latino of any race were 1.53% of the population.

There were 54 households, out of which 27.8% had children under the age of 18 living with them, 48.1% were married couples living together, 11.1% had a female householder with no husband present, and 33.3% were non-families. 31.5% of all households were made up of individuals, and 13.0% had someone living alone who was 65 years of age or older. The average household size was 2.43 and the average family size was 2.83.

In the village, the population was spread out, with 27.5% under the age of 18, 13.0% from 18 to 24, 22.1% from 25 to 44, 19.8% from 45 to 64, and 17.6% who were 65 years of age or older. The median age was 34 years. For every 100 females, there were 81.9 males. For every 100 females age 18 and over, there were 93.9 males.

The median income for a household in the village was $18,571, and the median income for a family was $31,875. Males had a median income of $33,750 versus $18,750 for females. The per capita income for the village was $10,367. There were 29.7% of families and 35.2% of the population living below the poverty line, including 33.3% of under eighteens and 26.3% of those over 64.
