= Harris, Missouri =

- City
- City of Harris
- Location of Harris, Missouri
- Coordinates: 40°18′22″N 93°21′01″W
- Country: United States
- State: Missouri
- County: Sullivan

Area
  - Total: 0.15 sq mi (0.40 km^{2})
  - Land: 0.15 sq mi (0.40 km^{2})
  - Water: 0 sq mi (0.00 km^{2})
- Elevation: 909 ft (277 m)

Population (2020)
  - Total: 65
  - Density: 422.2/sq mi (163.02/km^{2})
- Time zone: UTC-6 (Central (CST))
  - Summer (DST): UTC-5 (CDT)
- ZIP code: 64645
- Area code: 660
- FIPS code: 29-30466
- GNIS feature ID: 2396987

Harris is a city in Sullivan County, Missouri, United States. The population was 61 at the 2010 census, at which time it was a town.

== History ==
Harris was laid out in 1887. The community was named for A. W. Harris, an early settler. A post office was established at Harris in 1887.

== Geography ==
Harris is located in northwest Sullivan County on Missouri Route 139 just west of Medicine Creek. Newtown is about 4.5 miles to the north on Route 139 and Osgood lies around seven miles to the south. The Chicago, Milwaukee, St. Paul and Pacific Railroad passes the east side of the location.

According to the United States Census Bureau, the city has a total area of 0.15 square miles (0.39 km^{2}), all land.

== Demographics ==
Historical population
Census	Pop.	Note	%±
1900	336		—
1910	395		17.6%
1920	370		−6.3%
1930	313		−15.4%
1940	263		−16.0%
1950	181		−31.2%
1960	171		−5.5%
1970	174		1.8%
1980	116		−33.3%
1990	102		−12.1%
2000	105		2.9%
2010	61		−41.9%
2020	65		6.6%
U.S. Decennial Census

=== 2010 census ===
As of the census of 2010, there were 61 people, 30 households, and 14 families residing in the city. The population density was 406.7 inhabitants per square mile (157.0/km^{2}). There were 50 housing units at an average density of 333.3 per square mile (128.7/km^{2}). The racial makeup of the city was 98.4% White and 1.6% from two or more races.

There were 30 households, of which 36.7% had children under the age of 18 living with them, 23.3% were married couples living together, 16.7% had a female householder with no husband present, 6.7% had a male householder with no wife present, and 53.3% were non-families. 50.0% of all households were made up of individuals, and 10% had someone living alone who was 65 years of age or older. The average household size was 2.03 and the average family size was 2.64.

The median age in the city was 32.5 years. 32.8% of residents were under the age of 18; 13.1% were between the ages of 18 and 24; 21.4% were from 25 to 44; 22.9% were from 45 to 64; and 9.8% were 65 years of age or older. The gender makeup of the city was 50.8% male and 49.2% female.

=== 2000 census ===
As of the census of 2000, there were 105 people, 44 households, and 28 families residing in the town. The population density was 676.1 inhabitants per square mile (261.0/km^{2}). There were 49 housing units at an average density of 315.5 per square mile (121.8/km^{2}). The racial makeup of the town was 96.19% White, 0.95% Native American, 0.95% from other races, and 1.90% from two or more races. Hispanic or Latino of any race were 6.67% of the population.

There were 44 households, out of which 36.4% had children under the age of 18 living with them, 40.9% were married couples living together, 20.5% had a female householder with no husband present, and 34.1% were non-families. 34.1% of all households were made up of individuals, and 18.2% had someone living alone who was 65 years of age or older. The average household size was 2.39 and the average family size was 3.00.

In the town the population was spread out, with 33.3% under the age of 18, 7.6% from 18 to 24, 26.7% from 25 to 44, 10.5% from 45 to 64, and 21.9% who were 65 years of age or older. The median age was 33 years. For every 100 females, there were 101.9 males. For every 100 females age 18 and over, there were 94.4 males.

The median income for a household in the town was $20,500, and the median income for a family was $28,438. Males had a median income of $25,625 versus $13,750 for females. The per capita income for the town was $7,952. There were 20.0% of families and 15.9% of the population living below the poverty line, including 10.4% of under eighteens and 26.7% of those over 64.

== Notable person ==
- John C. England, officer in the United States Navy killed in the attack on Pearl Harbor
