= Polk Township, Sullivan County, Missouri =

Township in Sullivan County, Missouri, U.S.

Coordinates: 40.2056°N 93.1061°W

Polk Township is a township in Sullivan County, in the U.S. state of Missouri.

Polk Township was erected in 1845.
