= Polk Township, St. Clair County, Missouri =

Inactive township in the American state of Missouri

Coordinates: 38.0350°N 93.5686°W

Polk Township is an inactive township in St. Clair County, Missouri, United States.

Polk Township was erected in 1841, taking its name from President James K. Polk (1795–1849).
