= Polk Township, Cass County, Missouri =

Township in Cass County, Missouri, U.S.

Coordinates: 38.7664°N 94.1844°W

Polk Township is an inactive township in Cass County, in the U.S. state of Missouri.

Polk Township was established in 1872, taking its name from President James K. Polk.
