= Polk Township, Madison County, Missouri =

Inactive township in the US state of Missouri

Coordinates: 37.5881°N 90.4469°W

Polk Township is an inactive township in Madison County, in the U.S. state of Missouri.

Polk Township was established in 1857, and named after Charles K. Polk, a pioneer settler.
