= Polk Township, Ray County, Missouri =

Inactive township in the US state of Missouri

Coordinates: 39.4692°N 94.1381°W

Polk Township is an inactive township in Ray County, in the U.S. state of Missouri. It is part of the Kansas City metropolitan area.

== History ==
Polk Township was founded in August, 1845, and named for James K. Polk, who had just then started his first term of presidency.
