= 1956 United States presidential election in Missouri =

- November 6, 1956

Nominee	Adlai Stevenson	Dwight D. Eisenhower
Party	Democratic	Republican
Home state	Illinois	Pennsylvania (Note: Although he was born in Texas and grew up in Kansas before his military career, at the time of the 1952 election Eisenhower was president of Columbia University and was, officially, a resident of New York. During his first term as president, he moved his private residence to Gettysburg, Pennsylvania, and officially changed his residency to Pennsylvania.)
Running mate	Estes Kefauver	Richard Nixon
Electoral vote	13	0
Popular vote	918,273	914,289
Percentage	50.11%	49.89%
County results
Stevenson
50–60%
60–70%
70–80%
Eisenhower
50–60%
60–70%
70–80%
President before election
Dwight D. Eisenhower
Republican
Elected President
Dwight D. Eisenhower
Republican

The 1956 United States presidential election in Missouri took place on November 6, 1956, as part of the 1956 United States presidential election. Voters chose 13 representatives, or electors, to the Electoral College, who voted for president and vice president.

Democrat Adlai Stevenson II narrowly won the state of Missouri over the Republican incumbent, Dwight D. Eisenhower, thanks in large part to a 72,000-vote margin in St. Louis. This election saw the state deviate from its traditional status as a national bellwether; except for this election, Missouri voted for the winner of each U.S. presidential contest from 1904 to 2004. Missouri was the only state Eisenhower won in 1952 that Stevenson managed to flip. This is the last election in which the Republican nominee won the presidency without carrying Missouri. This was also the only state outside the old Confederacy that Stevenson won.

== Results ==
Presidential Candidate	Running Mate	Party	Electoral Vote (EV)	Popular Vote (PV)	
Adlai Stevenson	Estes Kefauver	Democratic	13	918,273	50.11%
Dwight D. Eisenhower (incumbent)	Richard Nixon (incumbent)	Republican	0	914,289	49.89%

=== Results by county ===
County	Adlai Stevenson Democratic		Dwight D. Eisenhower Republican		Margin		Total votes cast
County	#	%	#	%	#	%	Total votes cast
Adair	3,418	39.11%	5,322	60.89%	-1,904	-21.78%	8,740
Andrew	2,393	39.87%	3,609	60.13%	-1,216	-20.26%	6,002
Atchison	2,321	45.55%	2,774	54.45%	-453	-8.90%	5,095
Audrain	5,951	56.06%	4,664	43.94%	1,287	12.12%	10,615
Barry	4,523	42.73%	6,063	57.27%	-1,540	-14.54%	10,586
Barton	2,881	44.82%	3,547	55.18%	-666	-10.36%	6,428
Bates	4,300	44.03%	5,467	55.97%	-1,167	-11.94%	9,767
Benton	1,563	33.20%	3,145	66.80%	-1,582	-33.60%	4,708
Bollinger	2,185	43.44%	2,845	56.56%	-660	-13.12%	5,030
Boone	10,404	55.93%	8,197	44.07%	2,207	11.86%	18,601
Buchanan	18,384	47.51%	20,311	52.49%	-1,927	-4.98%	38,695
Butler	5,869	44.85%	7,216	55.15%	-1,347	-10.30%	13,085
Caldwell	1,929	37.49%	3,216	62.51%	-1,287	-25.02%	5,145
Callaway	5,165	59.12%	3,572	40.88%	1,593	18.24%	8,737
Camden	1,460	34.14%	2,817	65.86%	-1,357	-31.72%	4,277
Cape Girardeau	7,633	41.78%	10,638	58.22%	-3,005	-16.44%	18,271
Carroll	3,432	41.94%	4,751	58.06%	-1,319	-16.12%	8,183
Carter	1,067	50.81%	1,033	49.19%	34	1.62%	2,100
Cass	5,575	49.94%	5,589	50.06%	-14	-0.12%	11,164
Cedar	1,720	34.43%	3,276	65.57%	-1,556	-31.14%	4,996
Chariton	3,671	51.49%	3,459	48.51%	212	2.98%	7,130
Christian	1,730	31.67%	3,732	68.33%	-2,002	-36.66%	5,462
Clark	2,193	45.54%	2,623	54.46%	-430	-8.92%	4,816
Clay	13,605	50.31%	13,436	49.69%	169	0.62%	27,041
Clinton	2,976	49.58%	3,026	50.42%	-50	-0.84%	6,002
Cole	7,388	44.21%	9,323	55.79%	-1,935	-11.58%	16,711
Cooper	3,511	41.28%	4,995	58.72%	-1,484	-17.44%	8,506
Crawford	2,455	40.59%	3,594	59.41%	-1,139	-18.82%	6,049
Dade	1,479	35.90%	2,641	64.10%	-1,162	-28.20%	4,120
Dallas	1,600	34.88%	2,987	65.12%	-1,387	-30.24%	4,587
Daviess	2,611	43.98%	3,326	56.02%	-715	-12.04%	5,937
DeKalb	1,872	42.45%	2,538	57.55%	-666	-15.10%	4,410
Dent	2,961	52.70%	2,658	47.30%	303	5.40%	5,619
Douglas	1,133	28.02%	2,910	71.98%	-1,777	-43.96%	4,043
Dunklin	8,698	63.76%	4,943	36.24%	3,755	27.52%	13,641
Franklin	8,391	41.96%	11,605	58.04%	-3,214	-16.08%	19,996
Gasconade	1,353	21.03%	5,080	78.97%	-3,727	-57.94%	6,433
Gentry	2,662	46.85%	3,020	53.15%	-358	-6.30%	5,682
Greene	20,206	40.29%	29,944	59.71%	-9,738	-19.42%	50,150
Grundy	2,752	39.94%	4,139	60.06%	-1,387	-20.12%	6,891
Harrison	2,518	37.81%	4,141	62.19%	-1,623	-24.38%	6,659
Henry	4,900	45.84%	5,789	54.16%	-889	-8.32%	10,689
Hickory	695	29.50%	1,661	70.50%	-966	-41.00%	2,356
Holt	1,713	37.23%	2,888	62.77%	-1,175	-25.54%	4,601
Howard	3,542	61.93%	2,177	38.07%	1,365	23.86%	5,719
Howell	3,066	35.91%	5,473	64.09%	-2,407	-28.18%	8,539
Iron	1,970	52.12%	1,810	47.88%	160	4.24%	3,780
Jackson	133,522	52.22%	122,182	47.78%	11,340	4.44%	255,704
Jasper	13,404	39.64%	20,414	60.36%	-7,010	-20.72%	33,818
Jefferson	13,868	56.42%	10,712	43.58%	3,156	12.84%	24,580
Johnson	4,530	40.70%	6,599	59.30%	-2,069	-18.60%	11,129
Knox	1,850	48.89%	1,934	51.11%	-84	-2.22%	3,784
Laclede	3,287	39.29%	5,079	60.71%	-1,792	-21.42%	8,366
Lafayette	6,081	42.78%	8,133	57.22%	-2,052	-14.44%	14,214
Lawrence	4,789	39.38%	7,372	60.62%	-2,583	-21.24%	12,161
Lewis	2,728	54.25%	2,301	45.75%	427	8.50%	5,029
Lincoln	3,990	56.17%	3,114	43.83%	876	12.34%	7,104
Linn	5,055	50.13%	5,028	49.87%	27	0.26%	10,083
Livingston	3,785	42.29%	5,165	57.71%	-1,380	-15.42%	8,950
Macon	4,337	48.02%	4,694	51.98%	-357	-3.96%	9,031
Madison	2,280	45.21%	2,763	54.79%	-483	-9.58%	5,043
Maries	1,885	57.52%	1,392	42.48%	493	15.04%	3,277
Marion	6,874	54.86%	5,657	45.14%	1,217	9.72%	12,531
McDonald	2,757	43.06%	3,646	56.94%	-889	-13.88%	6,403
Mercer	1,109	35.27%	2,035	64.73%	-926	-29.46%	3,144
Miller	2,535	38.29%	4,085	61.71%	-1,550	-23.42%	6,620
Mississippi	3,653	63.38%	2,111	36.62%	1,542	26.76%	5,764
Moniteau	2,552	44.07%	3,239	55.93%	-687	-11.86%	5,791
Monroe	4,412	76.82%	1,331	23.18%	3,081	53.64%	5,743
Montgomery	2,844	45.24%	3,443	54.76%	-599	-9.52%	6,287
Morgan	2,131	40.25%	3,163	59.75%	-1,032	-19.50%	5,294
New Madrid	8,419	70.33%	3,552	29.67%	4,867	40.66%	11,971
Newton	5,529	41.51%	7,792	58.49%	-2,263	-16.98%	13,321
Nodaway	5,371	45.70%	6,381	54.30%	-1,010	-8.60%	11,752
Oregon	2,472	63.25%	1,436	36.75%	1,036	26.50%	3,908
Osage	2,445	44.28%	3,077	55.72%	-632	-11.44%	5,522
Ozark	887	29.29%	2,141	70.71%	-1,254	-41.42%	3,028
Pemiscot	8,064	67.02%	3,969	32.98%	4,095	34.04%	12,033
Perry	2,346	34.78%	4,400	65.22%	-2,054	-30.44%	6,746
Pettis	7,086	44.70%	8,766	55.30%	-1,680	-10.60%	15,852
Phelps	4,761	49.94%	4,773	50.06%	-12	-0.12%	9,534
Pike	4,232	54.92%	3,474	45.08%	758	9.84%	7,706
Platte	5,271	59.45%	3,596	40.55%	1,675	18.90%	8,867
Polk	2,968	40.23%	4,410	59.77%	-1,442	-19.54%	7,378
Pulaski	2,936	53.69%	2,532	46.31%	404	7.38%	5,468
Putnam	1,115	29.43%	2,674	70.57%	-1,559	-41.14%	3,789
Ralls	2,632	65.72%	1,373	34.28%	1,259	31.44%	4,005
Randolph	6,797	64.70%	3,709	35.30%	3,088	29.40%	10,506
Ray	4,636	60.39%	3,041	39.61%	1,595	20.78%	7,677
Reynolds	1,596	63.51%	917	36.49%	679	27.02%	2,513
Ripley	2,149	49.54%	2,189	50.46%	-40	-0.92%	4,338
St. Charles	7,618	44.60%	9,462	55.40%	-1,844	-10.80%	17,080
St. Clair	2,200	42.16%	3,018	57.84%	-818	-15.68%	5,218
St. Francois	7,566	43.15%	9,968	56.85%	-2,402	-13.70%	17,534
St. Louis	121,881	46.88%	138,111	53.12%	-16,230	-6.24%	259,992
St. Louis City	202,210	60.86%	130,045	39.14%	72,165	21.72%	332,255
Ste. Genevieve	2,363	47.30%	2,633	52.70%	-270	-5.40%	4,996
Saline	5,841	49.45%	5,970	50.55%	-129	-1.10%	11,811
Schuyler	1,648	52.35%	1,500	47.65%	148	4.70%	3,148
Scotland	2,044	54.09%	1,735	45.91%	309	8.18%	3,779
Scott	6,683	58.95%	4,654	41.05%	2,029	17.90%	11,337
Shannon	1,822	60.88%	1,171	39.12%	651	21.76%	2,993
Shelby	3,044	60.47%	1,990	39.53%	1,054	20.94%	5,034
Stoddard	6,369	56.86%	4,832	43.14%	1,537	13.72%	11,201
Stone	1,049	26.30%	2,939	73.70%	-1,890	-47.40%	3,988
Sullivan	2,805	45.52%	3,357	54.48%	-552	-8.96%	6,162
Taney	1,477	31.46%	3,218	68.54%	-1,741	-37.08%	4,695
Texas	4,506	50.87%	4,352	49.13%	154	1.74%	8,858
Vernon	4,547	46.73%	5,184	53.27%	-637	-6.54%	9,731
Warren	1,211	29.81%	2,852	70.19%	-1,641	-40.38%	4,063
Washington	2,380	41.30%	3,383	58.70%	-1,003	-17.40%	5,763
Wayne	2,451	49.38%	2,513	50.62%	-62	-1.24%	4,964
Webster	3,132	44.29%	3,940	55.71%	-808	-11.42%	7,072
Worth	1,354	50.30%	1,338	49.70%	16	0.60%	2,692
Wright	2,278	34.32%	4,360	65.68%	-2,082	-31.36%	6,638
Totals	918,273	50.11%	914,289	49.89%	3,984	0.22%	1,832,562

==== Counties that flipped from Republican to Democratic ====
- Chariton
- Clay
- Dent
- Linn
- Scotland
- Texas
- Worth

==== Counties that flipped from Democratic to Republican ====
- Phelps
- Wayne

== See also ==
- United States presidential elections in Missouri
