= Sullivan County, Missouri =

County in Missouri, United States

- County
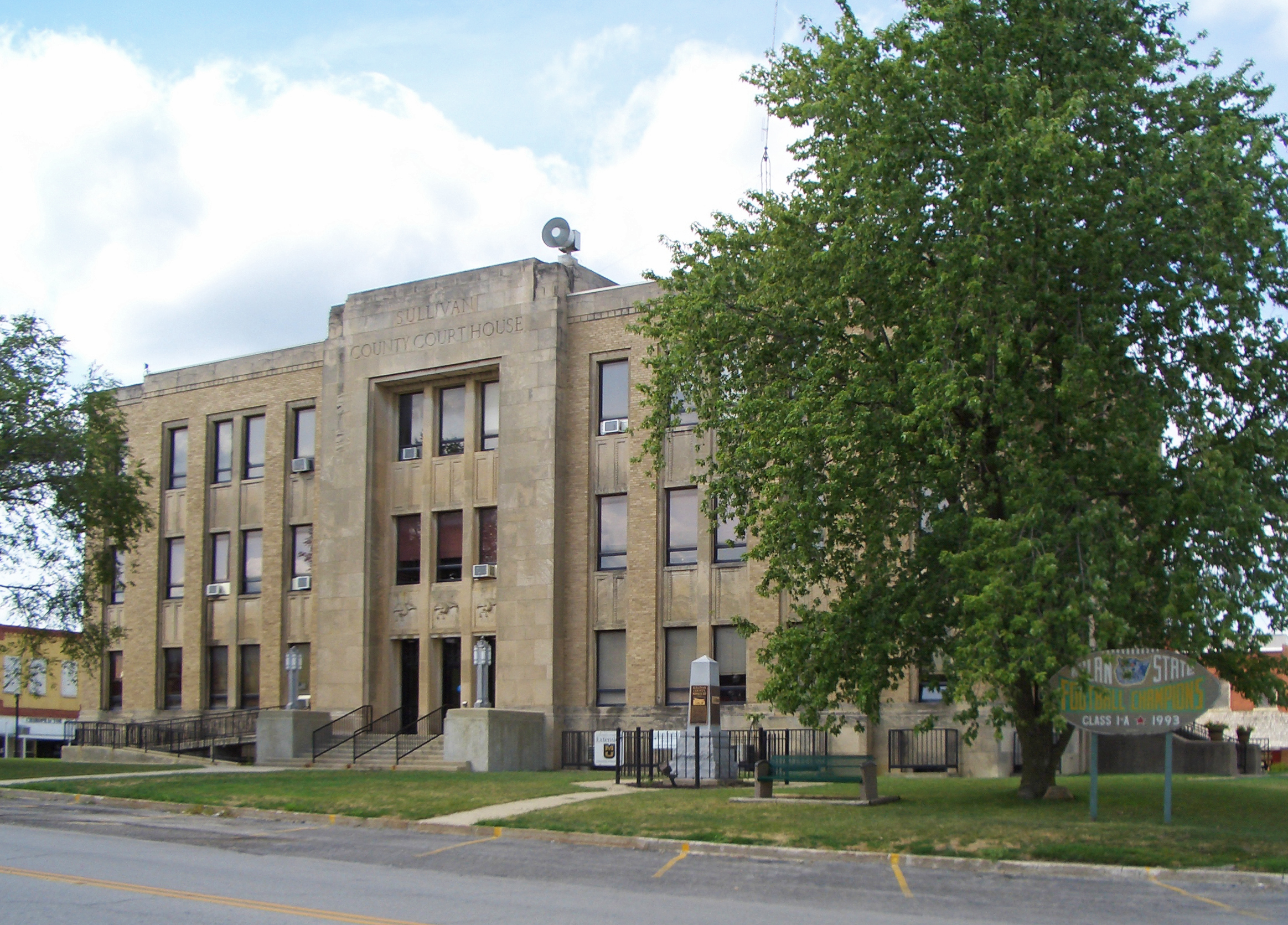
- Sullivan County Courthouse in Milan

- Location within the U.S. state of Missouri
- Coordinates: 40°13′N 93°07′W
- Country: United States
- State: Missouri
- Created: 1843
- Organized: 1845
- Named for: John Sullivan
- Seat: Milan
- Largest city: Milan

Area
  - Total: 652 sq mi (1,690 km^{2})
  - Land: 648 sq mi (1,680 km^{2})
  - Water: 3.5 sq mi (9.1 km^{2}) 0.5%

Population (2020)
  - Total: 5,999
  - Estimate (2025): 5,738 ▼
  - Density: 9.26/sq mi (3.57/km^{2})
- Time zone: UTC−6 (Central)
  - Summer (DST): UTC−5 (CDT)
- Congressional district: 6th

Sullivan County is a county located in the northern portion of the U.S. state of Missouri. As of the 2020 census, the population was 5,999. Its county seat is Milan. The county was organized February 14, 1845, and named for Major General John Sullivan of the American Revolutionary War.

== History ==
In 1682, René-Robert Cavelier, Sieur de la Salle claimed the territory west of the Mississippi River for France, which included present-day Sullivan County. The United States acquired this region under terms of the Louisiana Purchase on July 4, 1803. Twenty-one years later, the Sauk, Meskwaki, and Iowa Native American nations ceded their tribal land to the U.S. government under two treaties in August 1824.

Dr. Jacob Holland and his son, Robert W. Holland, arrived in 1836, becoming the county's first permanent White settlers. Dr. Holland, a veteran of the Black Hawk War and practitioner of herbal medicine, and son staked their home sites at the Main Locust Creek Settlement near a place called Scottsville. American pioneers from Ohio, Illinois, Kentucky, Tennessee, and Virginia quickly followed them and established farms and small businesses at Pharsalia (Milan) Settlement, Yellow Creek Settlement, and Jackson's Corners (Jacksonville) by 1840.

The Missouri state legislature defined the boundaries of the county from Chariton County during the 1842–1843 legislative session, and first named it Highland County. However, the number of permanent settlers did not meet requirements for civil governance and military purposes, so legislators attached administration of Highland County to Linn County. A new survey of the county in 1844 determined that the population was sufficient to permit full organization. E.M.C. Morelock, a representative from Highland County, presented an act to the state legislature, which they approved on February 14, 1845, and the county became formally organized. By the same act, it was renamed Sullivan County in honor of John Sullivan, a major general in the Continental Army during the American Revolutionary War.

Settlers established the town of Milan (pronounced MY-lun) in 1845, located at the center of the county, where the first courts met. William Putnam built the first courthouse, which was occupied in October 1847. Ten years later, residents leveled an Indian mound in the middle of town to make the public square and Major John McCollough built the second courthouse, the first brick structure in Milan, on this site during 1857–1858. (This courthouse was destroyed by fire in 1908 and it was not until 1938 that it was replaced by the three-story limestone building that stands today.) The last United States General Land Office established in Missouri also operated from the square from 1849 to 1859. The state legislature officially incorporated the city of Milan on February 8, 1859. Other towns platted in the county's early years included Greencastle (1857), Newtown (1858), Pollock (1873), Boynton and Cora (1877), Green City and Winigan (1880), Humphreys and Reger (1881), Osgood (1886), and Harris (1887). Green City College opened in 1885, and a business institute opened in Humphreys in 1884.

During the U.S. Civil War (1861–1865), a Union Army post stood in Milan. The Union cause was supported by four Union volunteer infantry regiments, two Union cavalry volunteer regiments, two Missouri Militia units, one provisional militia unit, and a large unit of Sullivan County Home Guards. The Confederate side was supported by four units of Missouri State Guard infantrymen. Soldiers from Sullivan County fought at the Battle of Shiloh, Battle of Atlanta, Battle of Jonesborough, and other major engagements throughout the war. Military skirmishes within the county were mostly confined to bushwhackers.

Expansion of the railroads brought growth to Sullivan County beginning in the 1870s. The C., B. & K.C. (Chicago, Burlington and Kansas City Railway) built a line running north to south through the county in 1876, which was followed by construction of the Quincy, Missouri & Pacific Railway line east to west through the county from 1878 to 1881. The two lines crossed in Milan, which became a major shipping point. The Chicago, Milwaukee & St. Paul Railway soon built a north–south line along Medicine Creek the length of the western edge of the county that served the towns of Newtown and Harris, which continues to be active today. (All three railroads eventually merged into the Chicago, Burlington and Quincy Railroad.)

By 1900, following the railroad construction boom, the county's population exceeded 20,000. However, business activity and the number of residents declined steadily during the subsequent decades. The number of farms decreased from about 3,100 in 1900 to under 900 by 1982, but over the same time period, the size of farms increased from about 130 acres to 385 acres. The county primarily remains rural agricultural land today, planted in corn and grains with family operated poultry, livestock, and dairy farms. One medium size manufacturer in Milan employs about 750 people.

== Geography ==
According to the U.S. Census Bureau, the county has a total area of 652 square miles (1,690 km^{2}), of which 648 square miles (1,680 km^{2}) is land and 3.5 square miles (9.1 km^{2}) (0.5%) is water.

The main water courses in Sullivan County are Medicine, Locust, East Locust, Yellow, and Spring Creeks. The highest point in the county, about 1,060 feet (320 m) above sea level, is on the primary divide between the Chariton River and Grand River drainage basins along its northern border shared with Putnam County northwest of Green City. The lowest point, about 740 feet (230 m) above sea level, is where Locust Creek flows out of the county on its southern border with Linn County, near the town of Browning.

=== Adjacent counties ===
- Putnam County (north)
- Adair County (east)
- Linn County (south)
- Grundy County (southwest)
- Mercer County (northwest)

=== Major highways ===
- Route 5
- Route 6
- Route 11
- Route 129
- Route 139

== Demographics ==
Historical population
Census	Pop.	Note	%±
1850	2,983		—
1860	9,108		205.3%
1870	11,907		30.7%
1880	16,569		39.2%
1890	19,000		14.7%
1900	20,282		6.7%
1910	18,598		−8.3%
1920	17,781		−4.4%
1930	15,212		−14.4%
1940	13,701		−9.9%
1950	11,299		−17.5%
1960	8,783		−22.3%
1970	7,572		−13.8%
1980	7,434		−1.8%
1990	6,326		−14.9%
2000	7,219		14.1%
2010	6,714		−7.0%
2020	5,999		−10.6%
2025 (est.)	5,738	▼	−4.4%
U.S. Decennial Census; 1790-1960 1900-1990; 1990-2000 2010-2015

=== 2020 census ===
As of the 2020 census, the county had a population of 5,999 and a median age of 42.1 years. 23.3% of residents were under the age of 18 and 20.1% of residents were 65 years of age or older. For every 100 females there were 106.6 males, and for every 100 females age 18 and over there were 104.8 males.

The racial makeup of the county was 78.0% White, 3.5% Black or African American, 0.9% American Indian and Alaska Native, 0.5% Asian, 0.0% Native Hawaiian and Pacific Islander, 9.1% from some other race, and 8.0% from two or more races. Hispanic or Latino residents of any race comprised 17.6% of the population.

0.0% of residents lived in urban areas, while 100.0% lived in rural areas.

There were 2,484 households in the county, of which 29.3% had children under the age of 18 living with them and 23.6% had a female householder with no spouse or partner present. About 32.5% of all households were made up of individuals and 14.9% had someone living alone who was 65 years of age or older. There were 3,024 housing units, of which 17.9% were vacant. Among occupied housing units, 69.7% were owner-occupied and 30.3% were renter-occupied. The homeowner vacancy rate was 1.1% and the rental vacancy rate was 12.1%.

=== Racial and ethnic composition ===
Sullivan County, Missouri – Racial and ethnic composition Note: the US Census treats Hispanic/Latino as an ethnic category. This table excludes Latinos from the racial categories and assigns them to a separate category. Hispanics/Latinos may be of any race.
Race / Ethnicity (NH = Non-Hispanic)	Pop 1980	Pop 1990	Pop 2000	Pop 2010	Pop 2020	% 1980	% 1990	% 2000	% 2010	% 2020
White alone (NH)	7,360	6,281	6,508	5,350	4,507	99.00%	99.29%	90.15%	79.68%	75.13%
Black or African American alone (NH)	5	1	9	30	208	0.07%	0.02%	0.12%	0.45%	3.47%
Native American or Alaska Native alone (NH)	20	14	12	32	26	0.27%	0.22%	0.17%	0.48%	0.43%
Asian alone (NH)	5	2	10	8	29	0.07%	0.03%	0.14%	0.12%	0.48%
Native Hawaiian or Pacific Islander alone (NH)	x	x	5	1	1	x	x	0.07%	0.01%	0.02%
Other race alone (NH)	3	0	0	4	14	0.04%	0.00%	0.00%	0.06%	0.23%
Mixed race or Multiracial (NH)	x	x	41	41	160	x	x	0.57%	0.61%	2.67%
Hispanic or Latino (any race)	41	28	634	1,248	1,054	0.55%	0.44%	8.78%	18.59%	17.57%
Total	7,434	6,326	7,219	6,714	5,999	100.00%	100.00%	100.00%	100.00%	100.00%

=== 2010 census ===
As of the census of 2010, there were 6,714 people, 2,925 households, and 1,959 families residing in the county. The population density was 11 people per square mile (4.2 people/km^{2}). There were 3,364 housing units at an average density of 5 units per square mile (1.9/km^{2}). The racial makeup of the county was 88.73% White, 0.51% Black or African American, 0.66% Native American, 0.12% Asian, 0.13% Pacific Islander, 8.67% from other races, and 1.19% from two or more races. Approximately 18.59% of the population were Hispanic or Latino of any race, making Sullivan County the most heavily Hispanic/Latino county in Missouri.

There were 2,925 households, out of which 29.60% had children under the age of 18 living with them, 53.30% were married couples living together, 9.10% had a female householder with no husband present, and 33.00% were non-families. 29.10% of all households were made up of individuals, and 15.00% had someone living alone who was 65 years of age or older. The average household size was 2.42 and the average family size was 2.95.

In the county, the population was spread out, with 25.00% under the age of 18, 7.50% from 18 to 24, 26.30% from 25 to 44, 22.70% from 45 to 64, and 18.50% who were 65 years of age or older. The median age was 39 years. For every 100 females there were 100.10 males. For every 100 females age 18 and over, there were 97.70 males.

The median income for a household in the county was $26,107, and the median income for a family was $33,590. Males had a median income of $23,245 versus $19,167 for females. The per capita income for the county was $13,392. About 11.00% of families and 16.50% of the population were below the poverty line, including 19.60% of those under age 18 and 20.90% of those age 65 or over.

== Education ==
=== Public schools ===
- Green City R-I School District – Green City
  - Green City Elementary School (PK-06)
  - Green City High School (07-12)
- Milan C-2 School District – Milan
  - Milan Elementary School (PK-04)
  - Milan Middle School (05-08)
  - Milan High School (09-12)
- Newtown-Harris R-III School District – Newtown
  - Newtown-Harris Elementary School (PK-06)
  - Newtown-Harris High School (07-12)

=== Public libraries ===
- Sullivan County Library

== Communities ==
=== Cities ===
- Browning (partly in Linn County)
- Green City
- Greencastle
- Harris
- Milan (county seat)
- Newtown

=== Villages ===
- Humphreys
- Osgood
- Pollock

=== Census-designated place ===
- Winigan

=== Unincorporated communities ===
- Owasco
- Reger

=== Former communities ===
- Bairdston
- Boynton
- Brown
- Bute
- Cookman
- Cora
- Jacksonville
- Judson
- Lindley
- Mystic
- Opel
- Parsons
- Paw Paw
- Pennville
- Scottsville
- Sorrell
- Sticklerville
- Wintersville

=== Townships ===
- Bowman
- Buchanan
- Clay
- Duncan
- Jackson
- Liberty
- Morris
- Penn
- Pleasant Hill
- Polk
- Taylor
- Union

== Notable people ==
- Gene Bartow - Hall of Fame college basketball coach and NBA executive.
- Fred Burke - bank robber and gangster, lived under an alias for several months near Green City before being captured there in March 1931.
- Bud Houser - Winner of multiple Olympic medals in track and field events. Born in Winigan.

== Politics ==
=== Local ===
The Republican and Democratic parties equally control politics at the local level in Sullivan County. Both parties hold about half of the elected positions in the county.

Sullivan County, Missouri

Elected countywide officials
Assessor	Karen LaFaver	Democratic
Circuit Clerk	Sherry Brinkley	Democratic
County Clerk	Jackie Morris	Democratic
Collector	Jennifer Hollon-Russell	Republican
Commissioner (presiding)	Chris May	Republican
Commissioner (district 1)	Mike Hepler	Democratic
Commissioner (district 2)	Danny Busick	Republican
Coroner	Paul Ruschmeier	Democratic
Prosecuting Attorney	Jerry A. Hollon	Democratic
Public Administrator	Joan Brummitt	Democratic
Recorder	Peggy Sloan	Republican
Sheriff	Roger Smiley	Republican
Surveyor	Brandon Piper	Republican
Treasurer	Jennifer Hollon-Russell	Republican

=== State ===
Past Gubernatorial Elections Results
Year	Republican	Democratic	Third Parties
2024	83.54% 2,020	14.97% 362	1.49% 36
2020	81.02% 1,985	18.00% 441	0.98% 25
2016	66.21% 1,642	31.73% 787	2.06% 51
2012	54.90% 1,429	42.41% 1,104	2.69% 70
2008	51.43% 1,476	46.03% 1,321	2.54% 73
2004	62.45% 1,929	35.77% 1,105	1.78% 55
2000	58.11% 1,755	40.33% 1,218	1.56% 47
1996	35.59% 1,084	62.57% 1,906	1.84% 56

Sullivan County is part of Missouri's 3rd district in the Missouri House of Representatives, currently represented by Nate Walker (R-Kirksville).

Missouri House of Representatives — District 3 — Sullivan County (2016)
Party	Candidate	Votes	%	±%
Republican	Nate Walker	2,152	100.00%	

Missouri House of Representatives — District 3 — Sullivan County (2014)
Party	Candidate	Votes	%	±%
Republican	Nate Walker	1,300	100.00%	

Missouri House of Representatives — District 3 — Sullivan County (2012)
Party	Candidate	Votes	%	±%
Republican	Nate Walker	1,552	59.49%	
Democratic	Rebecca McClanahan	1,057	40.51%	

Sullivan County is a part of Missouri's 12th District in the Missouri Senate and is currently represented by Dan Hegeman (R-Cosby).

Missouri Senate — District 12 — Sullivan County (2014)
Party	Candidate	Votes	%	±%
Republican	Dan Hegeman	1,227	100.00	

=== Federal ===
U.S. Senate — Missouri — Sullivan County (2016)
Party	Candidate	Votes	%	±%
Republican	Roy Blunt	1,662	67.23%	+23.85
Democratic	Jason Kander	735	29.73%	−20.62
Libertarian	Jonathan Dine	37	1.50%	−4.77
Green	Johnathan McFarland	17	0.69%	+0.69
Constitution	Fred Ryman	21	0.85%	+0.85

U.S. Senate — Missouri — Sullivan County (2012)
Party	Candidate	Votes	%	±%
Republican	Todd Akin	1,128	43.38%	
Democratic	Claire McCaskill	1,309	50.35%	
Libertarian	Jonathan Dine	163	6.27%	

Sullivan County is included in Missouri's 6th Congressional District and is currently represented by Sam Graves (R-Tarkio) in the U.S. House of Representatives.

U.S. House of Representatives — Missouri's 6th Congressional District — Sullivan County (2016)
Party	Candidate	Votes	%	±%
Republican	Sam Graves	1,897	77.27%	+1.46
Democratic	David M. Blackwell	506	20.61%	−1.12
Libertarian	Russ Lee Monchil	35	1.43%	−1.03
Green	Mike Diel	17	0.69%	+0.69

U.S. House of Representatives — Missouri’s 6th Congressional District — Sullivan County (2014)
Party	Candidate	Votes	%	±%
Republican	Sam Graves	1,172	75.81%	+6.70
Democratic	Bill Hedge	336	21.73%	−7.34
Libertarian	Russ Lee Monchil	38	2.46%	+0.64

U.S. House of Representatives — Missouri's 6th Congressional District — Sullivan County (2012)
Party	Candidate	Votes	%	±%
Republican	Sam Graves	1,785	69.11%	
Democratic	Kyle Yarber	751	29.07%	
Libertarian	Russ Lee Monchil	47	1.82%	

United States presidential election results for Sullivan County, Missouri
Year	Republican		Democratic		Third party(ies)	
Year	No.	%	No.	%	No.	%
1888	2,021	50.58%	1,948	48.75%	27	0.68%
1892	2,173	49.79%	2,095	48.01%	96	2.20%
1896	2,393	49.07%	2,451	50.26%	33	0.68%
1900	2,386	49.06%	2,395	49.25%	82	1.69%
1904	2,474	51.43%	2,224	46.24%	112	2.33%
1908	2,389	50.61%	2,269	48.07%	62	1.31%
1912	1,819	38.69%	2,226	47.35%	656	13.95%
1916	2,420	49.02%	2,446	49.54%	71	1.44%
1920	4,576	56.35%	3,475	42.79%	70	0.86%
1924	3,885	49.33%	3,703	47.02%	287	3.64%
1928	4,183	55.80%	3,292	43.92%	21	0.28%
1932	3,373	45.26%	4,053	54.38%	27	0.36%
1936	4,019	50.08%	3,986	49.67%	20	0.25%
1940	4,080	52.07%	3,743	47.77%	13	0.17%
1944	3,611	52.00%	3,328	47.93%	5	0.07%
1948	3,140	47.63%	3,443	52.23%	9	0.14%
1952	3,746	55.15%	3,041	44.77%	5	0.07%
1956	3,357	54.48%	2,805	45.52%	0	0.00%
1960	3,202	56.12%	2,504	43.88%	0	0.00%
1964	2,052	43.23%	2,695	56.77%	0	0.00%
1968	2,332	52.24%	1,907	42.72%	225	5.04%
1972	2,611	62.18%	1,588	37.82%	0	0.00%
1976	2,141	47.75%	2,313	51.58%	30	0.67%
1980	2,412	55.77%	1,824	42.17%	89	2.06%
1984	2,306	56.38%	1,784	43.62%	0	0.00%
1988	1,897	54.75%	1,562	45.08%	6	0.17%
1992	1,326	38.59%	1,510	43.95%	600	17.46%
1996	1,275	41.75%	1,402	45.91%	377	12.34%
2000	1,877	61.26%	1,127	36.78%	60	1.96%
2004	1,880	60.86%	1,178	38.14%	31	1.00%
2008	1,607	56.01%	1,173	40.89%	89	3.10%
2012	1,610	62.04%	908	34.99%	77	2.97%
2016	1,884	75.78%	526	21.16%	76	3.06%
2020	1,974	79.89%	478	19.34%	19	0.77%
2024	2,035	82.62%	408	16.57%	20	0.81%

=== Missouri presidential preference primary (2008) ===
Former U.S. Senator Hillary Clinton (D-New York) received more votes, a total of 506, than any candidate from either party in Sullivan County during the 2008 presidential primary.

== See also ==
- National Register of Historic Places listings in Sullivan County, Missouri
