= Bee Branch =

Bee Branch may refer to:

== Political divisions ==
- Bee Branch, Arkansas, an unincorporated community
- Bee Branch Township, Chariton County, Missouri, a township in Missouri

== Rivers ==
- Bee Branch Creek (California), a stream in California
- Bee Branch Creek, a creek in Dubuque, Iowa
- Bee Branch (Bridge Creek tributary), a stream in Missouri
- Bee Branch (Chariton River tributary), a stream in Missouri
- Bee Branch (Cobb Creek tributary), a stream in Missouri
- Bee Branch (South Fork Blackwater River tributary), a stream in Missouri
