= Triplett =

Triplett may refer to:

== Places ==
In the United States

- Triplett, Kentucky
- Triplett, Missouri
- Triplett Township, Chariton County, Missouri
- Triplett, Clay County, West Virginia
- Triplett, Roane County, West Virginia

== Other uses ==
- Triplett (surname)

== See also ==
- Triplet (disambiguation)
