= Clarks Creek (Missouri) =

Stream in the US state of Missouri

Clarks Creek (also known as Clarks Branch) is a stream in Chariton and Linn counties in the U.S. state of Missouri. It is a tributary of Mussel Fork.

The stream headwaters arise in southeast Linn County at 39°46′26″N 92°53′56″W on the south side of Bucklin. It flows south-southwest passing under US Route 36 and east of Marceline to enter Chariton County. It flows south generally parallel and east of Missouri Route 5 passing the community of Mike to enter Mussel Fork at 39°32′55″N 92°57′01″W approximately 3.7 miles west of the community of Mussel Fork.

Clarks Creek has the name of Henry Clark, a pioneer citizen.

== See also ==
- List of rivers of Missouri
