= Hampden =

Hampden may refer to:

== Places ==
=== Australia ===
- Hampden, Queensland
- Hampden, South Australia
- County of Hampden, Victoria, Australia
- Electoral district of Hampden, Victoria, Australia
- Shire of Hampden, a former local government area in Melbourne, Victoria, Australia

=== Canada ===
- Hampden, Newfoundland and Labrador
- Hampden, Quebec

=== Great Britain ===
- Hampden Park, a football stadium in Glasgow, third local ground using the name
  - Hampden Park (1873–83), its first predecessor
  - Second Hampden Park (known as such 1883–1903)
- Hampden Park, Eastbourne, a suburb of Eastbourne, Sussex
- Great and Little Hampden, a parish in Buckinghamshire

=== New Zealand ===
- Hampden, New Zealand
  - Hampden (New Zealand electorate)
- Murchison, New Zealand, known as Hampden until 1882

=== United States ===
- Hampden, Alabama
- Hampden, Maine, a town in Penobscot County
  - Hampden (CDP), Maine, census-designated place within the town
  - Hampden Academy, former theological seminary, now a public high school
- Hampden, Baltimore, Maryland, a neighborhood
- Hampden County, Massachusetts
  - Hampden, Massachusetts, a town in Hampden County
- Hampden, North Dakota
- Hampden, Ohio
- Hampden, West Virginia
- Hampden, Wisconsin
- Hampden Township (disambiguation)
- The fictitious town of Hampden, Vermont, in Donna Tartt's novel The Secret History

=== Jamaica ===
- Hampden Estate, a rum distillery in Trelawny Parish

== People ==
- John Hampden (circa 1595–1643), English politician and Roundhead in the English Civil War
- John Hampden (1653–1696) (1653–1696), English politician, pamphleteer, and opponent of Charles II and James II, convicted of treason after the Monmouth Rebellion
- Renn Hampden (1793–1868), English theologian, Professor at Oxford, Bishop of Hereford (1847–68)
- Richard Hampden (1631–1695), English Whig politician, Privy Counsellor, and Chancellor of the Exchequer for William III of England
- Walter Hampden (1879–1955), American actor
- Viscount Hampden
  - 1st Viscount Hampden (disambiguation)

== Other ==
- Hampden & Co., a British independent private bank
- Hampden Bank, a registered national historic building in Springfield, Massachusetts
- Handley Page Hampden, a British medium bomber aircraft of World War 2
- Hampden Park (disambiguation)
- Hampden–Sydney College, an all-male liberal arts college in Hampden–Sydney, Virginia
- USS Hampden, a United States Navy brigantine
- USS Hampden County, a United States Navy landing craft

== See also ==
- The Hampdens, an Australian indie pop band
