= Snyder =

Snyder may refer to:

== Places in the United States ==
- Snyder, Colorado
- Snyder, Missouri
- Snyder, Nebraska
- Snyder, New York
- Snyder, Oklahoma
- Snyder, Texas
- Snyder County, Pennsylvania
- Snyder Township, Blair County, Pennsylvania
- Snyder Township, Jefferson County, Pennsylvania

== People ==
- Snyder (surname)

== Fictional characters ==
- Alan Snyder, the leader of the Los Angeles bloc in Colony
- Carly Snyder, character in As the World Turns
- Holden Snyder, character in As the World Turns
- Jack Snyder (As the World Turns), character in As the World Turns
- Luke Snyder, character in As the World Turns
- Meg Snyder, character in As the World Turns
- Principal Snyder, character in Buffy the Vampire Slayer

== See also ==
- Snyder High School (disambiguation)
- Schneider (disambiguation)
- Schnyder
- Snider (disambiguation)
- Sneider
- Snyders (disambiguation)
