= Clarks Creek =

Clarks Creek may refer to:

- Clarks Creek (Kansas), a stream in Geary and Morris counties
- Clarks Creek (Missouri), a stream
- Clarks Creek (Lackawanna River), a stream in Wayne County, Pennsylvania
- Clarks Creek (Ararat River tributary), a stream in Patrick County, Virginia
- Clarks Creek (Harrison County, Texas), a stream in Harrison County, Texas

== See also ==
- Clark Creek (disambiguation)
