= Hamden =

Hamden is the name of several places in the United States of America. It also is a surname.

== Places ==
- Hamden, Connecticut
- Hamden Township, Becker County, Minnesota
- Hamden, Missouri
- Hamden, New York
- Hamden, Ohio
- Hamden, Oklahoma

== Name ==
- Erika Hamden, US astrophysicist and Assistant Professor

== See also ==
- Hampden (disambiguation)
