= Palmer Creek (Missouri River tributary) =

Stream in Missouri

Palmer Creek is a stream in Chariton County in the U.S. state of Missouri. It is a tributary of the Missouri River.

The stream headwaters arise at 39°31′54″N 93°02′27″W and it flows generally south passing the community of Indian Grove. It continues to the south entering the Missouri River floodplain passing under US Route 24 approximately midway between Brunswick and Keytesville. The stream passes through the Cut-Off Lake and enters the Missouri just west of the Chariton River confluence at 39°18′59″N 92°58′06″W.

Palmer Creek was named after Maillard Palmer, the first state representative from Chariton County.
