= Forest Green =

Forest Green may refer to:

== Music ==
- A hymn tune arranged by Ralph Vaughan Williams for singing "O Little Town of Bethlehem"
- "Forest Green, Oh Forest Green", a single by Holly Miranda
- "Forest Green", a song by Odd Future from The OF Tape Vol. 2
- "Forest Green", a song by Big Red Machine from their self-titled album

== Places ==
- Forest Green, Surrey, England
- Forest Green, Gloucestershire, England
- Forest Green, Missouri, United States
- A community in Perry Township, Michigan, United States
- An area of Upton, Massachusetts, United States

== Other ==
- Forest green, a shade of green
- Forest Green Rovers F.C., a football club in Gloucestershire, England
- Forest green butterfly (Euryphura achlys), a butterfly of Africa
- "Forest Green", an episode of The Mentalist (season 6)
- Forest Green (novel), a novel from Canadian novelist Kate Pullinger
