= Sneider =

Sneider is a surname. Notable people with the surname include:

- Estella Sneider (born 1950), Mexican television and radio personality
- Jeff Sneider, American journalist
- Maria Adelaide Sneider (1937–1989), Italian mathematician
- Richard Sneider (1922–1986), American diplomat
- Roberto Sneider, Mexican writer, director and producer
- Tamás Sneider (born 1972), Hungarian politician
- Vern Sneider (1916–1981), American novelist

== See also ==
- Snyder (disambiguation)
- Schnyder
- Schneider (disambiguation)
- Snider (disambiguation)
