= Lagonda (disambiguation) =

Lagonda is a British luxury car marque now owned by Aston Martin.

Lagonda may also refer to:

- Lagonda, Missouri, an unincorporated community
- Lagonda Creek, river in Springfield, Ohio, USA
- Lagonda Club, in Springfield, Ohio, USA
- Lagonda Manufacturing Company, now part of Elliott Tool Technologies
- "Lagonda" (plantation), sugar plantation established by Lewis Strong Clarke
- Bela Lagonda (b. 1954) a.k.a. Alberto Hauss, German composer
- Staines Lagonda F.C., football club now called now Staines Town F.C.
- Lagonda IPA, India pale ale brewed by Marble Brewery, Manchester
