= Musselfork Township, Chariton County, Missouri =

Unincorporated community in the American state of Missouri

Coordinates: 39.567°N 92.920°W

Musselfork Township is a township in Chariton County, in the U.S. state of Missouri.

Musselfork Township was established in 1840, and named after nearby Mussel Fork creek.
