= Locust Hill (Brunswick, Missouri) =

Historic house in Missouri, United States

- U.S. National Register of Historic Places
- Location within Missouri Location within the United States
- Location: East of Brunswick, Missouri, on Route Y
- Coordinates: 39°26′16″N 93°06′40″W
- Area: 4.2 acres (1.7 ha)
- Built: c. 1860, c. 1880
- Architectural style: Second Empire
- NRHP reference No.: 80002349
- Added to NRHP: January 10, 1980

Locust Hill, also known as the McGruder Estate, is a historic home located near Brunswick, Chariton County, Missouri. The original section was built about 1860 and enlarged about 1880. It is a two-story, Second Empire style frame dwelling. It features a mansard roof faced with red, green, grey and black hexagonal slates and a mansarded cupola over the main entrance. The interior features wallpapers imported from France in the parlors and pine woodwork. Also on the property are three additional contributing buildings.

It was listed on the National Register of Historic Places in 1980.
