= Prairie Hill =

Prairie Hill can be any of the following places in the United States:

- Prairie Hill, Missouri
- Prairie Hill, Texas:
  - Prairie Hill, Limestone County, Texas
  - Prairie Hill, Washington County, Texas
