= Cunningham, Chariton County, Missouri =

Human settlement in Chariton County, Missouri, United States

Coordinates: 39°38′30″N 93°14′25″W

Cunningham is an unincorporated community in Chariton County, in the U.S. state of Missouri. The community is approximately one mile south of Sumner. Swan Lake and the Swan Lake National Wildlife Refuge are one-half mile to the south.

== History ==
Cunningham was platted in 1870, and named in honor of Dr. John F. Cunningham, a local elected official. A post office was established at Cunningham in 1871, and remained in operation until 1910.
