= Triplet =

A triplet is a set of three items. It may refer to:

== Science ==
- A series of three nucleotide bases forming an element of the Genetic code
- J-coupling as part of Nuclear magnetic resonance spectroscopy
- Opal in preparation to be a gemstone
- Spin triplet in quantum mechanics, as in triplet oxygen, or triplet state in general
- Triplet (mathematics), a tuple of length 3

== Technologies ==
- Triplet lens, an optical device consisting of three single lenses
- Tandem bicycle, with three seats

== Other uses ==
- Triplets, the multiple birth of three children
- Triplet Lakes, a group of lakes in Minnesota
- The Triplets, a Spanish children's book
- The Triplets (band), a Latin pop group
- Binghamton Triplets, a minor league baseball team
- A triplet, a kind of assembled gem
- In music, a tuplet of three successive notes of equal duration
- "The Triplets", Tyler Johnson, Ondrej Palat, and Nikita Kucherov of the 2014–15 Tampa Bay Lightning

== See also ==
- Triplett (disambiguation)
- Tercet, or tristich, in poetry
- Triad (disambiguation), another general term for a group of three
- Triptych, a work of art which is divided into three sections
- Trilogy
- Triple deity, a deity with three apparent forms that function as a singular whole
