= Shannondale =

Shannondale may refer to:

- Shannondale, Indiana
- Shannondale, Chariton County, Missouri
- Shannondale, Shannon County, Missouri
- Shannondale, West Virginia
