= Clark Creek =

Clark Creek may refer to:

- Clark Creek (Gasconade River), a river in Missouri
- Clark Creek (Elkhorn River), a river in Nebraska
- Clark Creek (Montana), a stream in Flathead County, Montana
- Clark Creek (Susquehanna River), a river in Pennsylvania

== See also ==
- Clark Creek Natural Area, a state park in Mississippi
- Clarke Creek, Queensland, a locality in Australia
- Clarks Creek (disambiguation)
