= Brunswick Township, Chariton County, Missouri =

Township in the state of Missouri

Coordinates: 39.4470891°N 93.0874216°W

Brunswick Township is a township in Chariton County, in the U.S. state of Missouri.

Brunswick Township was established in 1840, taking its name from Brunswick, Missouri.
