= Jay Creek =

Jay Creek may refer to:

- Jay Creek (Missouri), a stream in the U.S. state of Missouri
- Jay Creek, Northern Territory, a ghost town in Australia
