= Jay Creek (Missouri) =

Stream in the U.S. state of Missouri

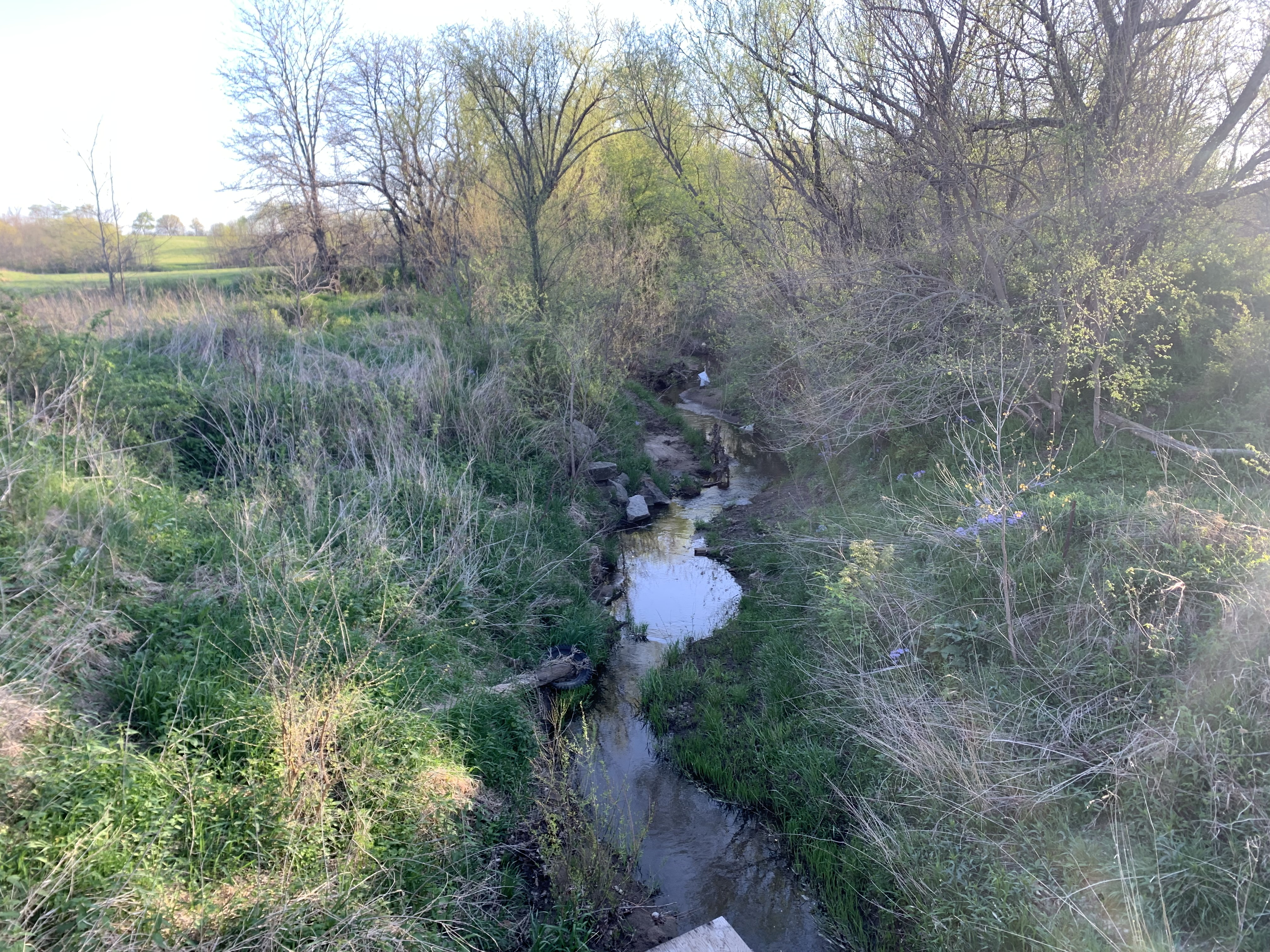
Jay Creek at Jaguar Avenue bridge west of Grant City

Jay Creek is a stream in Worth County in the U.S. state of Missouri. It is a tributary of Marlowe Creek.

The stream headwaters arise one mile south of the Missouri-Iowa state line at 40°33′30″N 94°23′49″W and an elevation of approximately 1150 feet. The stream flows to the south-southwest roughly paralleling the west side of U.S. Route 169. It flows past the northwest side of Grant City to its confluence with Marlowe Creek just north of Missouri Route 46 one mile west of Grant City at 40°29′19″N 94°26′51″W and an elevation of 958 feet.

Jay Creek has the name of one William Jay.

== See also ==
- List of rivers of Missouri
