= Louisville, Chariton County, Missouri =

Unincorporated community in Missouri, U.S.

Coordinates: 39°14′33″N 92°50′38″W

Louisville is an unincorporated community in Chariton County, in the U.S. state of Missouri.

The community was named after Louisville, Kentucky, the native home of an early settler.
