= Musselfork, Missouri =

Unincorporated community in Missouri, U.S.

Coordinates: 39°33′05″N 92°52′32″W

Musselfork (also known as Muscle Fork) is an unincorporated community in Chariton County, in the U.S. state of Missouri. The community is located on Missouri Route DD approximately eight miles (13 km) north-northeast of Keytesville. The stream Mussel Fork flows past approximately two miles to the west.

== History ==
Musselfork was founded in the 1870s, and named after nearby Mussel Fork creek. A post office called Muscle Fork was established in 1870, the name was changed to Musselfork in 1895, and the post office closed in 1939.
