= Snider =

Snider may refer to:

== Places ==
United States

- Snider, West Virginia, an unincorporated community
- Sniderville, Wisconsin, an unincorporated community

== Other uses ==
- Snider (surname)
- Snider–Enfield, a firearm

== See also ==
- Snyder (disambiguation)
- Schneider (disambiguation)
- Schnyder, a Swiss surname
