= Morrice, Michigan =

- Village
- Village of l
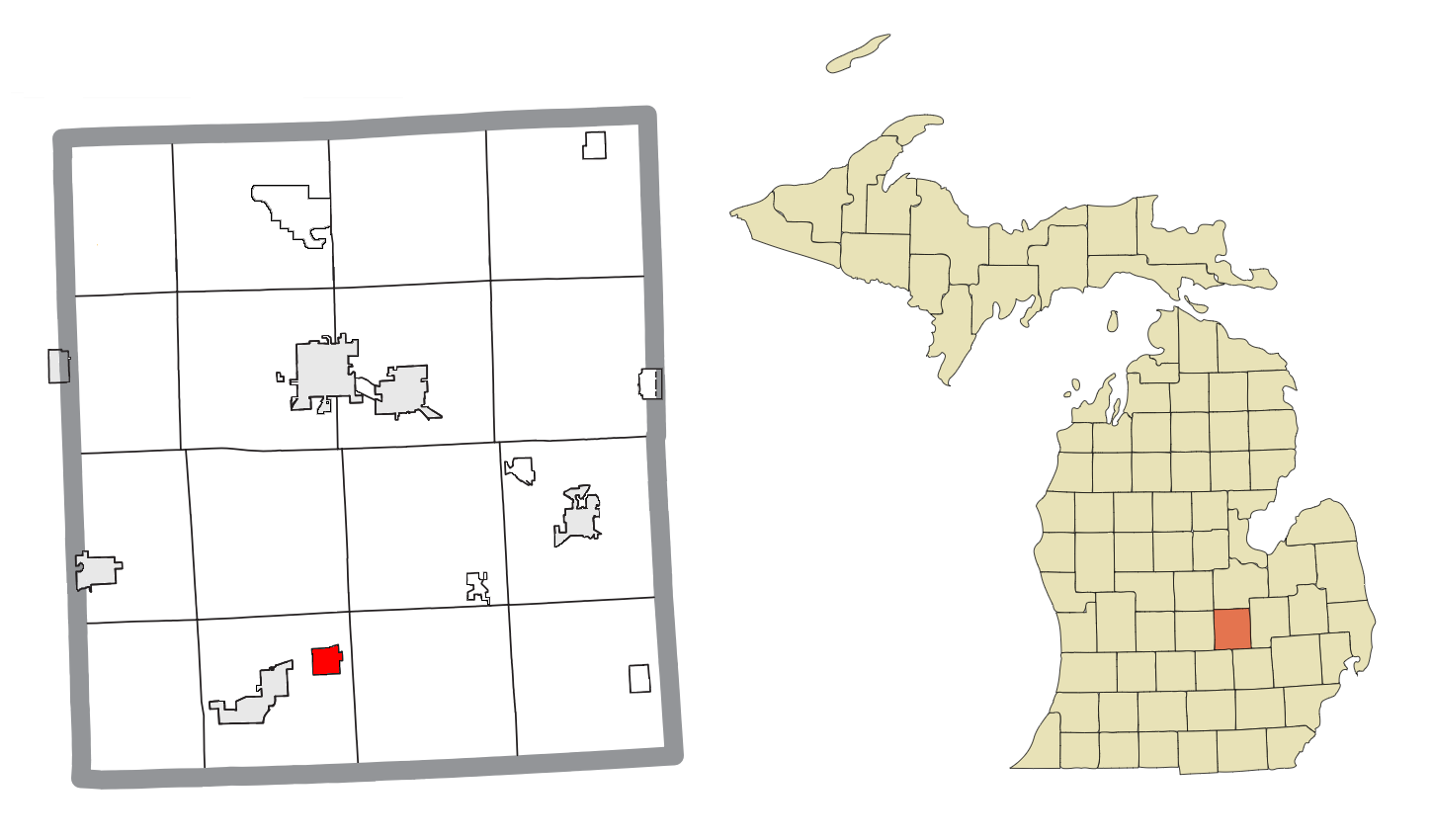
- Location within Shiawassee County

- Location within the state of Michigan
- Coordinates: 42°50′10″N 84°11′00″W
- Country: United States
- State: Michigan
- County: Shiawassee
- Township: Perry
- Settled: 1837
- Incorporated: 1884

Government
  - Type: Village council
  - President: Harold Dickerson

Area
  - Total: 1.39 sq mi (3.59 km^{2})
  - Land: 1.30 sq mi (3.37 km^{2})
  - Water: 0.085 sq mi (0.22 km^{2})
- Elevation: 896 ft (273 m)

Population (2020)
  - Total: 949
  - Density: 728.4/sq mi (281.23/km^{2})
- Time zone: UTC-5 (Eastern (EST))
  - Summer (DST): UTC-4 (EDT)
- ZIP code(s): 48857
- Area code: 517
- FIPS code: 26-55560
- GNIS feature ID: 2399396
- Website: Official website

Morrice is a village located in Shiawassee County in the U.S. state of Michigan. The population was 949 at the 2020 census. The village is located within Perry Township. The center of population of Michigan is located near Morrice.

== History ==
The village was named for William Morrice, a pioneer settler from Aberdeenshire, Scotland, who moved in 1837 to the area that would become the village.

== Geography ==
According to the United States Census Bureau, the village has a total area of 1.38 square miles (3.57 km^{2}), of which 1.30 square miles (3.37 km^{2}) is land and 0.08 square miles (0.21 km^{2}) (5.80%) is water.

== Demographics ==
Historical population
Census	Pop.	Note	%±
1880	229		—
1890	422		84.3%
1900	476		12.8%
1910	470		−1.3%
1920	372		−20.9%
1930	370		−0.5%
1940	462		24.9%
1950	501		8.4%
1960	530		5.8%
1970	734		38.5%
1980	733		−0.1%
1990	630		−14.1%
2000	882		40.0%
2010	927		5.1%
2020	949		2.4%
U.S. Decennial Census

=== 2010 census ===
As of the census of 2010, there were 927 people, 367 households, and 239 families living in the village. The population density was 713.1 inhabitants per square mile (275.3/km^{2}). There were 404 housing units at an average density of 310.8 per square mile (120.0/km^{2}). The racial makeup of the village was 97.0% White, 0.1% African American, 0.6% Native American, 0.1% Asian, 0.3% from other races, and 1.8% from two or more races. Hispanic or Latino of any race were 1.6% of the population.

There were 367 households, of which 37.6% had children under the age of 18 living with them, 46.3% were married couples living together, 12.0% had a female householder with no husband present, 6.8% had a male householder with no wife present, and 34.9% were non-families. 30.0% of all households were made up of individuals, and 13.9% had someone living alone who was 65 years of age or older. The average household size was 2.53 and the average family size was 3.12.

The median age in the village was 32.6 years. 28.7% of residents were under the age of 18; 8.3% were between the ages of 18 and 24; 30.6% were from 25 to 44; 20.1% were from 45 to 64; and 12.4% were 65 years of age or older. The gender makeup of the village was 50.8% male and 49.2% female.

=== 2000 census ===
As of the census of 2000, there were 882 people, 316 households, and 232 families living in the village. The population density was 837.4 inhabitants per square mile (323.3/km^{2}). There were 348 housing units at an average density of 330.4 per square mile (127.6/km^{2}). The racial makeup of the village was 95.58% White, 0.68% African American, 0.68% Native American, 0.34% Asian, 0.57% from other races, and 2.15% from two or more races. Hispanic or Latino of any race were 1.70% of the population.

There were 316 households, out of which 42.4% had children under the age of 18 living with them, 55.7% were married couples living together, 11.7% had a female householder with no husband present, and 26.3% were non-families. 19.3% of all households were made up of individuals, and 6.3% had someone living alone who was 65 years of age or older. The average household size was 2.79 and the average family size was 3.20.

In the village, the population was spread out, with 32.2% under the age of 18, 9.0% from 18 to 24, 35.0% from 25 to 44, 17.7% from 45 to 64, and 6.1% who were 65 years of age or older. The median age was 30 years. For every 100 females, there were 100.5 males. For every 100 females age 18 and over, there were 96.1 males.

The median income for a household in the village was $40,417, and the median income for a family was $42,000. Males had a median income of $34,886 versus $24,196 for females. The per capita income for the village was $17,423. About 4.3% of families and 5.1% of the population were below the poverty line, including 6.7% of those under age 18 and 7.4% of those age 65 or over.
