= Cockrell Township, Chariton County, Missouri =

Township in Missouri, United States

Coordinates: 39.5743751°N 92.8081159°W

Cockrell Township is a township in Chariton County, in the U.S. state of Missouri. It was most likely named for Francis Marion Cockrell, a state legislator.
