= Newcomer, Missouri =

Unincorporated community in Missouri, U.S.

Coordinates: 39°30′41″N 93°05′23″W

Newcomer is an unincorporated community in Chariton County, in the U.S. state of Missouri.

== History ==
A post office called Newcomer was established in 1886, and remained in operation until 1906. W. F. Newcomer, an early postmaster, most likely gave the community his last name.
