= Mendon Township, Chariton County, Missouri =

Township in the US state of Missouri

Coordinates: 39.571914°N 93.142949°W

Mendon Township is a township in Chariton County, in the U.S. state of Missouri.

Mendon Township was established in 1840.
