= Salt Creek Township, Chariton County, Missouri =

Township in the state of Missouri

Coordinates: 39.571°N 93.000°W

Salt Creek Township is a township in Chariton County, in the U.S. state of Missouri.

Salt Creek Township was established in 1840.
