= Lewis Mill, Missouri =

Unincorporated community in Missouri, U.S.

Coordinates: 39°15′27″N 92°51′11″W

Lewis Mill is an unincorporated community in Chariton County, in the U.S. state of Missouri.

The community was named after the proprietor of a local grain elevator. The Keokuk and Kansas City Railway served the area in the late 19th century. It was a railroad station stop on service provided by the Baltimore & Ohio Railroad. In 1884 it had a population of over 600 people. Lewis Mill Access is state-operated conservation area near the Little Chariton River.
