= Bee Branch Township, Chariton County, Missouri =

Township in the American state of Missouri

Coordinates: 39.6555761°N 92.7748398°W

Bee Branch Township is a township in Chariton County, in the U.S. state of Missouri.

Bee Branch Township takes its name from Bee Branch creek.
