= Triplett Township, Chariton County, Missouri =

Township in the US state of Missouri

Coordinates: 39.50°N 93.22°W

Triplett Township is a township in Chariton County, in the U.S. state of Missouri.

Triplett Township was established in 1840. The township was named for J. E. M. Triplett, one of the founders of the town of Triplett.
