= Snyders =

Snyders, or Snyder's, may refer to:

- Snyders, Pennsylvania
- Snyder's of Hanover, pretzel manufacturer in Hanover, Pennsylvania
  - Snyder's-Lance, parent company of the combined Snyder's and Lance food companies
- Snyder of Berlin, potato chip manufacturer near Berlin, Pennsylvania, a division of Birds Eye foods
- Snyders (surname)

== See also ==
- Snijders
- Snyder (disambiguation)
