= Guthridge, Missouri =

Unincorporated community in Missouri, U.S.

Coordinates: 39°32′37″N 92°58′38″W

Guthridge is an unincorporated community in Chariton County, in the U.S. state of Missouri.

== History ==
Guthridge was originally called Guthridge Mills, and under the latter name was laid out in 1858, and named after James Guthridge, the proprietor of a local mill. A post office called Guthridges Mills was established in 1879, and remained in operation until 1906.
