= Salisbury Township, Chariton County, Missouri =

Inactive township in the US state of Missouri

Coordinates: 39.4065609°N 92.7858068°W

Salisbury Township is a township in Chariton County, in the U.S. state of Missouri.

Salisbury Township was founded on April 1, 1867, and named after the founder, Judge Lucien Salisbury. Judge Salisbury had moved to Chariton County in 1858, and established a post office in 1863. The population as of 2023 is 2,455.
