= Clark Township, Chariton County, Missouri =

Township in Chariton County, Missouri, United States

Coordinates: 39.6576471°N 92.9155291°W

Clark Township is a township in Chariton County, in the U.S. state of Missouri.

Clark Township has the name of Henry Clark, a pioneer citizen.
