= Marlowe Creek =

River in the United States of America

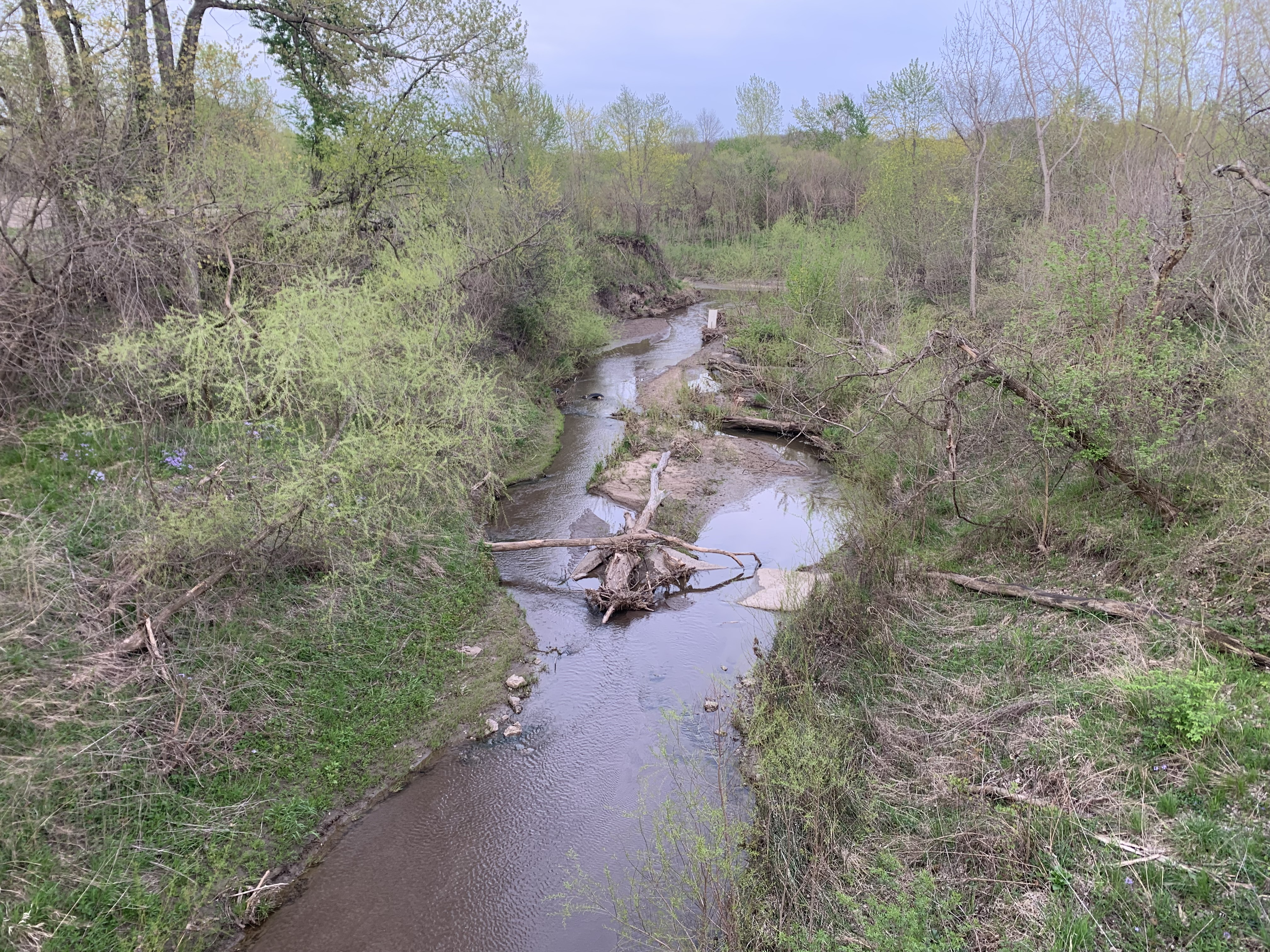
Marlowe Creek from Killdeer Lane bridge in Middlefork Township

Marlowe Creek is a stream in Worth County in the U.S. state of Missouri. It is a tributary of the Middle Fork Grand River.

The stream headwaters arise about one-quarter mile south of the Missouri-Iowa state line at 40°33′55″N 94°24′37″W at an elevation of approximately 1140 feet. The stream flows to the southwest and south passing Grant City approximately four miles north of its confluence with the Middle Fork at 40°25′50″N 94°26′29″W and an elevation of 912 feet.

A variant name was "Marlow Creek". The stream bears the name of a local minister.

== See also ==
- List of rivers of Missouri
