= Yellow Creek Township, Chariton County, Missouri =

Township in the state of Missouri

Coordinates: 39.64°N 93.02°W

Yellow Creek Township is a township in Chariton County, in the U.S. state of Missouri.

Yellow Creek Township was established in 1840, and named after the Yellow Creek.
