= Bynumville, Missouri =

Unincorporated community in Missouri, U.S.

Coordinates: 39°37′00″N 92°46′34″W

Location of Bynumville within the state of Missouri

Bynumville is an unincorporated community in eastern Chariton County, Missouri, United States. It is located approximately twelve miles (19 km) north of Salisbury on Route 129.

Bynumville was named for Dr. Joseph Bynum, an early settler. A post office called Bynumville was established in 1854, and remained in operation until 1967. The town site was not officially platted until 1878.
