= Triplett, Roane County, West Virginia =

Unincorporated community in West Virginia, US

Coordinates: 38°50′22″N 81°17′53″W

Triplett is an unincorporated community in Roane County, in the U.S. state of West Virginia.

== History ==
A post office called Triplett was established in 1888, and remained in operation until 1939. The community was named after nearby Triplett Run.
