= Snyder, Missouri =

- Location within Missouri Location within the United States
- Coordinates: 39°39′59″N 93°14′25″W
- Country: United States
- State: Missouri
- County: Chariton
- Elevation: 659 ft (201 m)
- Time zone: UTC−06:00 (CST)
  - Summer (DST): UTC−05:00 (CDT)
- Area code: 660
- GNIS feature ID: 735858

Snyder is an unincorporated community in western Chariton County, Missouri, United States. It is located on Missouri Supplemental Route Z, approximately eighteen miles northeast of Carrollton. Snyder's post office, opened in 1889, closed in 1972, and mail is now delivered from nearby Triplett
