= Chariton Township, Chariton County, Missouri =

Township in the US state of Missouri

Coordinates: 39.2954563°N 92.8823214°W

Chariton Township is a township in Chariton County, in the U.S. state of Missouri.

Chariton Township was established in 1840, taking its name from the Chariton River.
