= Rockford, Missouri =

Unincorporated community in Missouri

Coordinates: 39°20′47″N 92°54′52″W

Rockford is an unincorporated community in Chariton County, in the U.S. state of Missouri.

== History ==
A post office called Rockford was established in 1893, and remained in operation until 1925. The community was named for a rocky ford near the original town site.
