= Cunningham Township, Chariton County, Missouri =

Township in the state of Missouri

Coordinates: 39.6478739°N 93.2058631°W

Cunningham Township is a township in Chariton County, in the U.S. state of Missouri.

Cunningham Township was established in 1840, taking the name of Dr. John F. Cunningham, a pioneer citizen.
