= Westville, Missouri =

Unincorporated community in Missouri, U.S.

Coordinates: 39°38′34″N 92°54′29″W

Westville is an unincorporated community in Chariton County, in the U.S. state of Missouri.

== History ==
Westville was platted in 1857, and named after Dr. W. S. West, a first settler. A post office called Westville was established in 1857, and remained in operation until 1909.
