= Indian Grove, Missouri =

Unincorporated community in Missouri

Coordinates: 39°30′38″N 93°02′06″W

Indian Grove is an unincorporated community in Chariton County, in the U.S. state of Missouri.

The community sits at the intersection of Missouri routes M and F above the west bank of Palmer Creek. Keytesville is seven miles to the southeast.

== Facts ==
Around the Indian Grove area, the elevation is about 800 feet above sea level . It being in the state of Missouri puts it into the Central Time Zone, and it falls into the area code 660.

== History ==
A post office called Indian Grove was established in 1878, and remained in operation until 1906. The first commercial establishment at Indian Grove opened in 1880. St. Raphael catholic church was dedicated on June 2, 1886, and as of 2024 conducts a mass on the second and fourth Saturday of each month.
