= Wayland Township, Chariton County, Missouri =

Township in the US state of Missouri

Coordinates: 39.51°N 92.75°W

Wayland Township is a township in Chariton County, in the U.S. state of Missouri.

Wayland Township most likely has the name of Eli Wayland, a pioneer citizen.
