= Keytesville Township =

Township in the American state of Missouri

Coordinates: 39.451515°N 92.928470°W

Keytesville Township is a township in Chariton County, in the U.S. state of Missouri.

Keytesville Township took its name from Keytesville, Missouri.
