= Sumner, Missouri =

- City
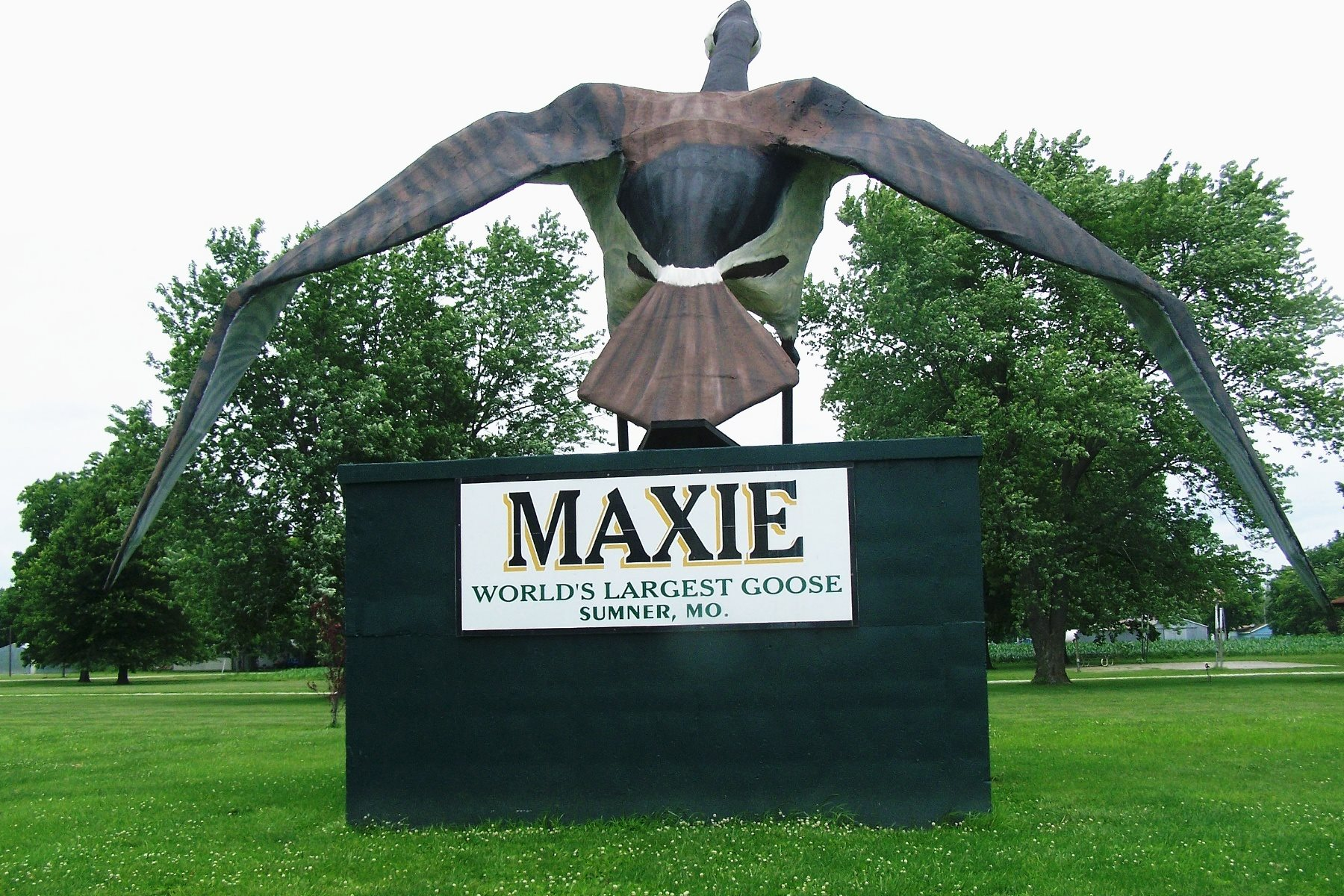
- Nickname: Goose capital of the world
- Location of Sumner, Missouri
- Coordinates: 39°39′22″N 93°14′36″W
- Country: United States
- State: Missouri
- County: Chariton

Area
  - Total: 0.23 sq mi (0.59 km^{2})
  - Land: 0.23 sq mi (0.59 km^{2})
  - Water: 0 sq mi (0.00 km^{2})
- Elevation: 679 ft (207 m)

Population (2020)
  - Total: 78
  - Density: 344.8/sq mi (133.12/km^{2})
- Time zone: UTC-6 (Central (CST))
  - Summer (DST): UTC-5 (CDT)
- ZIP code: 64681
- Area code: 660
- FIPS code: 29-71620
- GNIS feature ID: 2397688

Sumner is a city in Chariton County, Missouri, United States. The population was 78 at the 2020 census. It was named in honor of U.S. Senator Charles Sumner.

== History ==
The area along the Grand River in the northwest corner of present-day Chariton County was first explored by two sons of Daniel Boone and Thomas Stanley prior to Missouri statehood in 1821. Stanley established a trading post some time later, near what would eventually become Sumner. Other than the trading post, not much existed in the area for several years, partly due to marshlands and flooding on the Grand River.

The area around Sumner was originally known as Crossland, and about one mile away was the much larger village of Cunningham. The coming of the Chicago, Burlington and Quincy Railroad to the community, combined with the Wabash Railroad's decision to move their depot from Cunningham to Sumner, gave the latter the upper hand in growth.

Sumner was laid out by Joel H. Wilkerson in June, 1882. That fall, the first home was constructed in the new village by J.M. Vanes, soon followed by the Commercial Hotel. A newspaper, the Sumner Star, was established in 1890 and operated for several years.

Once teeming with wildlife such as prairie chicken, turkey, duck, and deer in the 1800s, the population of such was drastically reduced by over hunting and draining of the native wetlands, notably Hog Lake in 1911. In 1937, concerned about wetland preservation in the wake of the Dust Bowl, the U.S. Congress established the Swan Lake National Wildlife Refuge just to the south of Sumner. Roads, buildings, and man-made wetlands were soon created by the Civilian Conservation Corps, and by 1941 eight hundred geese wintered in the area.

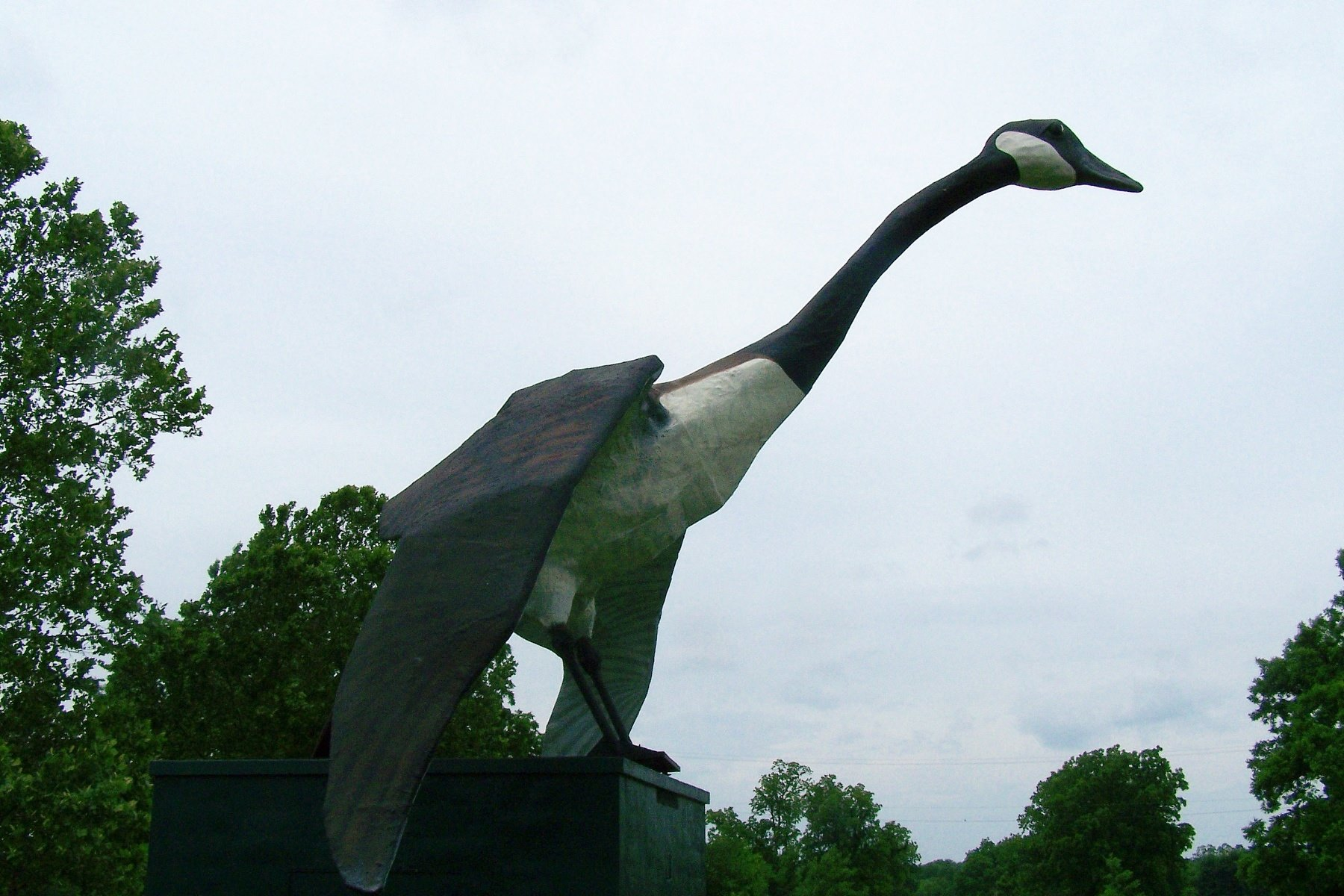
"Maxie", the Canada goose

Located on a migratory flyway, Swan Lake and the Sumner area began to attract ever larger numbers of geese in the mid- and late 20th century, reaching 100,000 or more by the 1980s and 1990s. This also led to a yearly influx of hunters, benefiting the few Sumner businesses and Chariton County as a whole. With these numbers in mind, Sumner was proclaimed the "Wild Goose Capital of the World". Sumner began to hold a yearly Goose Festival in 1955, which is still held each October, with a variety of activities including live music, a queen contest, food and a parade.

Sumner residents commissioned a Kansas City sculptor in 1976 to create a large statue to honor the community's status and reputation for waterfowl hunting. What resulted was the "World's Largest Goose". Named "Maxie", the fiberglass and metal structure stands over forty feet tall with a wingspan of sixty-five feet and a weight of over 5,000 pounds.

== Geography ==
Sumner is located at 39°39′23″N 93°14′36″W (39.656342, -93.243426).

According to the United States Census Bureau, the city has a total area of 0.23 square miles (0.60 km^{2}), all land.

== Demographics ==
Historical population
| Census | Pop. | Note | %± |
|---|---|---|---|
| 1890 | 286 | | — |
| 1900 | 477 | | 66.8% |
| 1910 | 394 | | −17.4% |
| 1920 | 468 | | 18.8% |
| 1930 | 348 | | −25.6% |
| 1940 | 338 | | −2.9% |
| 1950 | 309 | | −8.6% |
| 1960 | 234 | | −24.3% |
| 1970 | 178 | | −23.9% |
| 1980 | 182 | | 2.2% |
| 1990 | 140 | | −23.1% |
| 2000 | 142 | | 1.4% |
| 2010 | 102 | | −28.2% |
| 2020 | 78 | | −23.5% |
U.S. Decennial Census

=== 2010 census ===
As of the census of 2010, there were 102 people, 52 households, and 26 families residing in the city. The population density was 443.5 inhabitants per square mile (171.2/km^{2}). There were 87 housing units at an average density of 378.3 per square mile (146.1/km^{2}). The racial makeup of the city was 100.0% White.

There were 52 households, of which 19.2% had children under the age of 18 living with them, 28.8% were married couples living together, 11.5% had a female householder with no husband present, 9.6% had a male householder with no wife present, and 50.0% were non-families. 46.2% of all households were made up of individuals, and 23% had someone living alone who was 65 years of age or older. The average household size was 1.96 and the average family size was 2.77.

The median age in the city was 49 years. 20.6% of residents were under the age of 18; 3.8% were between the ages of 18 and 24; 20.6% were from 25 to 44; 28.4% were from 45 to 64; and 26.5% were 65 years of age or older. The gender makeup of the city was 52.9% male and 47.1% female.

=== 2000 census ===
As of the census of 2000, there were 142 people, 66 households, and 34 families residing in the town. The population density was 549.7 inhabitants per square mile (212.2/km^{2}). There were 99 housing units at an average density of 383.2 per square mile (148.0/km^{2}). The racial makeup of the town was 97.18% White, 0.70% African American, 0.70% Native American, and 1.41% from two or more races.

There were 66 households, out of which 22.7% had children under the age of 18 living with them, 37.9% were married couples living together, 7.6% had a female householder with no husband present, and 47.0% were non-families. 42.4% of all households were made up of individuals, and 22.7% had someone living alone who was 65 years of age or older. The average household size was 2.15 and the average family size was 3.06.

In the town the population was spread out, with 23.2% under the age of 18, 7.0% from 18 to 24, 22.5% from 25 to 44, 24.6% from 45 to 64, and 22.5% who were 65 years of age or older. The median age was 44 years. For every 100 females, there were 77.5 males. For every 100 females age 18 and over, there were 84.7 males.

The median income for a household in the town was $14,792, and the median income for a family was $23,750. Males had a median income of $26,250 versus $14,583 for females. The per capita income for the town was $21,025. There were 30.0% of families and 32.5% of the population living below the poverty line, including 51.6% of under eighteens and 13.5% of those over 64.

== Notable people ==
- J. William Fulbright, senator, born in Sumner in 1905
