= Wilbur Sweatman =

American ragtime and jazz bandleader and clarinetist (1882–1961)

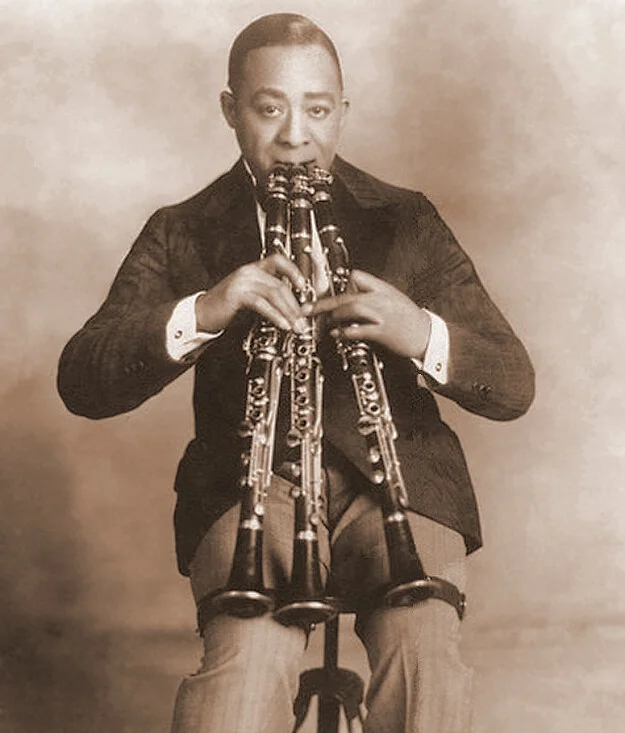

Background information
- Born: February 7, 1882; Brunswick, Missouri, U.S.
- Died: March 9, 1961 (aged 79) New York City
- Genres: Dixieland, ragtime
- Occupation: musician
- Instrument: clarinet
- Years active: 1890s–1950s
- Labels: Emerson, Columbia

Wilbur Coleman Sweatman (February 7, 1882 – March 9, 1961) was an American ragtime and dixieland jazz composer, bandleader and clarinetist. Sweatman was one of the first African-American musicians to have fans nationwide. He was also a trailblazer in the racial integration of musical groups.

== Early life ==
Sweatman was born February 7, 1882, in Brunswick, Missouri, to parents Matilda and Coleman Sweatman. Wilbur's father ran a barbershop in the riverside town to provide for his family, which also included daughters Eva and Lula. His mother was apparently of mixed racial background as she and the children were listed as mulatto on some census reports. While Wilbur was still a toddler his father abandoned the family, moving to St. Joseph, Missouri, and starting a new family. His mother persevered, continuing to operate the barbershop as well as taking in boarders. Wilbur received his education at the segregated Elliott School in Brunswick and helped out around the barbershop after school. His older sister Eva was responsible for much of Wilbur Sweatman's early music training, teaching him to play piano. Later Sweatman would become a self-taught violinist, and subsequently took up the clarinet as well. Over the years he would also learn to play trombone, bass clarinet and organ.

== Music career ==
Wilbur Sweatman's professional music career began in the late 1890s when, still a teenager, he toured with circus bands, first with Professor Clark Smith's Pickaninny Band from Kansas City, then with the P. G. Lowery Band. By 1901 he had become the youngest orchestra leader in America by fronting the Forepaugh and Sells Circus band. Sweatman briefly played with the bands of W.C. Handy and Mahara's Minstrels before organizing his own dance band in Minneapolis by late 1902. It was there that Sweatman made his first recordings on phonograph cylinders in 1903 for the Metropolitan Music Store. These included what is reputed to have been the first recorded version of Scott Joplin's "Maple Leaf Rag"; no copies are known. In 1908 Sweatman moved to Chicago, playing around the city in places like the Pekin Inn and the Monogram Theater before becoming the bandleader at the Grand Theater, and began to attract notice; a 1910 article referred to his nickname, "Sensational Swet." As well as performing, Sweatman wrote and arranged music for his band. In addition, he worked with Dave Peyton and William Henry "Billy" Dorsey to arrange and transcribe music for other performers.

By 1911, he had moved to the vaudeville circuit full-time, developing a successful act of playing three clarinets at once. An Indianapolis account described his performance there:

Though somewhat diminutive in stature, Wilbur C. Sweatman has a style and grace of manner in all of his executions that is at once convincing, and the soulfulness of expression that he blends into his tones is something wonderful. His first number was a medley of popular airs and "rags" and had everybody shuffling their pedal extremities before it was half over.

He wrote a number of rags, "Down Home Rag" (1911) being the most commercially successful. The song was recorded by multiple bands in America and Europe. Sweatman moved to New York in 1913, and toured widely. He was one of the few black solo acts to appear regularly on the major white vaudeville circuits. Around this time he became close friends with Scott Joplin; Joplin's will would name Sweatman as executor of his estate. Joplin's musical papers, including unpublished manuscripts, were willed to Sweatman, who took care of them while generously sharing access to those who inquired. However, as Joplin's music came to be considered passé, such requests were few. After Sweatman's death in 1961, the papers went into storage during a legal battle between Sweatman's heirs and their current location is unknown, or even whether they still exist.

In December 1916, Sweatman recorded for minor label Emerson Records, including his own "Down Home Rag". Some historians consider these recordings among the earliest examples of jazz on record. Taking note of the commercial success of the Original Dixieland Jass Band and the Original Creole Orchestra, Sweatman abruptly changed his sextet's sound and instrumentation in early 1917. Sweatman's band consisted of five saxophonists and himself on clarinet, a combo which soon signed with Pathé. They recorded rags, as well as some of the hit songs of the day.

Sweatman was the first African American to make recordings labeled as "Jass" and "Jazz". Since Sweatman can be heard making melodic variations even in his 1916 recordings, it might be argued that Sweatman recorded an archaic type of jazz earlier than the Original Dixieland band. In 1917, he became one of the first blacks to join ASCAP.

In 1918, Sweatman landed with major label Columbia Records, where he would enjoy a rapid rise in popularity with a wide variety of songs under his own name. His band also delivered several shorter anonymous performances for the label's "Little Wonder" line of 90-second-long budget releases. The Sweatman band's first release, "Regretful Blues"/"Everybody's Crazy" would ship 140,000 copies, at a time when a third as many sales was considered a hit. Sweatman singles shipped over a million copies in 1919 alone. Several more successful releases followed in 1918–19, Sweatman's peak of popularity. His best-selling song was "Kansas City Blues" (1919), which shipped 180,000 copies. However, by 1920 sales were on the wane, perhaps reflecting the ephemeral interest in his novelty style of jazz, and the growing popularity of syncopated big bands such as Columbia's own Ted Lewis.

== Later years ==
Sweatman continued to perform in live appearances throughout the Northeast, but never significantly altered the style established in his earlier career. Several notable musicians passed through his band, including Duke Ellington, Coleman Hawkins and Cozy Cole. Sweatman also continued to record for such labels as Gennett, Edison, Grey Gull and Victor. He frequently played at the well-known Harlem club Connie's Inn. He continued playing in New York through the 1940s and early 1950s, but increasingly concentrated his efforts on the music publishing business and talent booking. His earlier compositions provided Sweatman with a steady income. In 1937 alone, ASCAP reported that "Down Home Rag" had been played on the radio over 2000 times, Sweatman receiving royalties for each play.

Wilbur Sweatman died in New York City on March 9, 1961. His daughter Barbara initially inherited his estate, consisting mostly of his publishing business and some personal papers. The estate, which also included the papers of Scott Joplin, eventually ended up in the hands of Sweatman's sister Eva.
