= Bee Branch (Chariton River tributary) =

Stream in Missouri, U.S.

Coordinates: 39°30′35″N 92°49′50″W

Bee Branch is a stream in Chariton County in the U.S. state of Missouri. It is a tributary of the Chariton River.

Bee Branch most likely was named for frequency of honeybees along its course.

== See also ==
- List of rivers of Missouri
