= Justice Schneider =

Justice Schneider may refer to:

- Louis J. Schneider Jr. (1921–1999), associate justice of the Ohio Supreme Court
- Michael H. Schneider Sr. (born 1943), associate justice of the Supreme Court of Texas
