= Triplett (surname) =

Triplett is a surname. Notable people with the surname include:

- Bill Triplett (born 1940), American football player
- Coaker Triplett (1911–1992), American baseball player
- Constance Triplett, American politician
- Dave Triplett (born 1950), American football coach
- Donald Triplett (1933–2023), American man who was the first person diagnosed as autistic
- Ernie Triplett (1906–1934), American racecar driver
- Frank Triplett (1885–1967), Australian rules footballer
- George Washington Triplett (1809–1894), American Confederate politician
- Irene Triplett (1930–2020), American Civil War pensioner
- Jaidyn Triplett (born 2010), American actress and singer
- Kirk Triplett (born 1962), American golfer
- Mel Triplett (1930–2002), American football player
- Michael Triplett (1964–2013), American journalist
- Nate Triplett (born 1987), American football player
- Norman Triplett (1861–1934), American social psychologist
- Norman Triplett (baseball) (1892–1918), American baseball player
- Philip Triplett (1799–1852), American politician
- Russell Triplett, American college baseball coach
- Sally Ann Triplett (born 1962), British singer and actress
- Samuel Triplett (1869–1957), American Medal of Honor recipient
- Skip Triplett, American CEO of Kwantlen University College in Vancouver
- Thomas Triplett (1602–1670), British churchman, teacher and Canon at Westminster Abbey
- Tom Triplett (1935–2006), American politician
- Wallace Triplett (1926–2018), American football player
