= Swan Lake National Wildlife Refuge =

Protected land in Missouri, U.S.

- IUCN category IV (habitat/species management area)
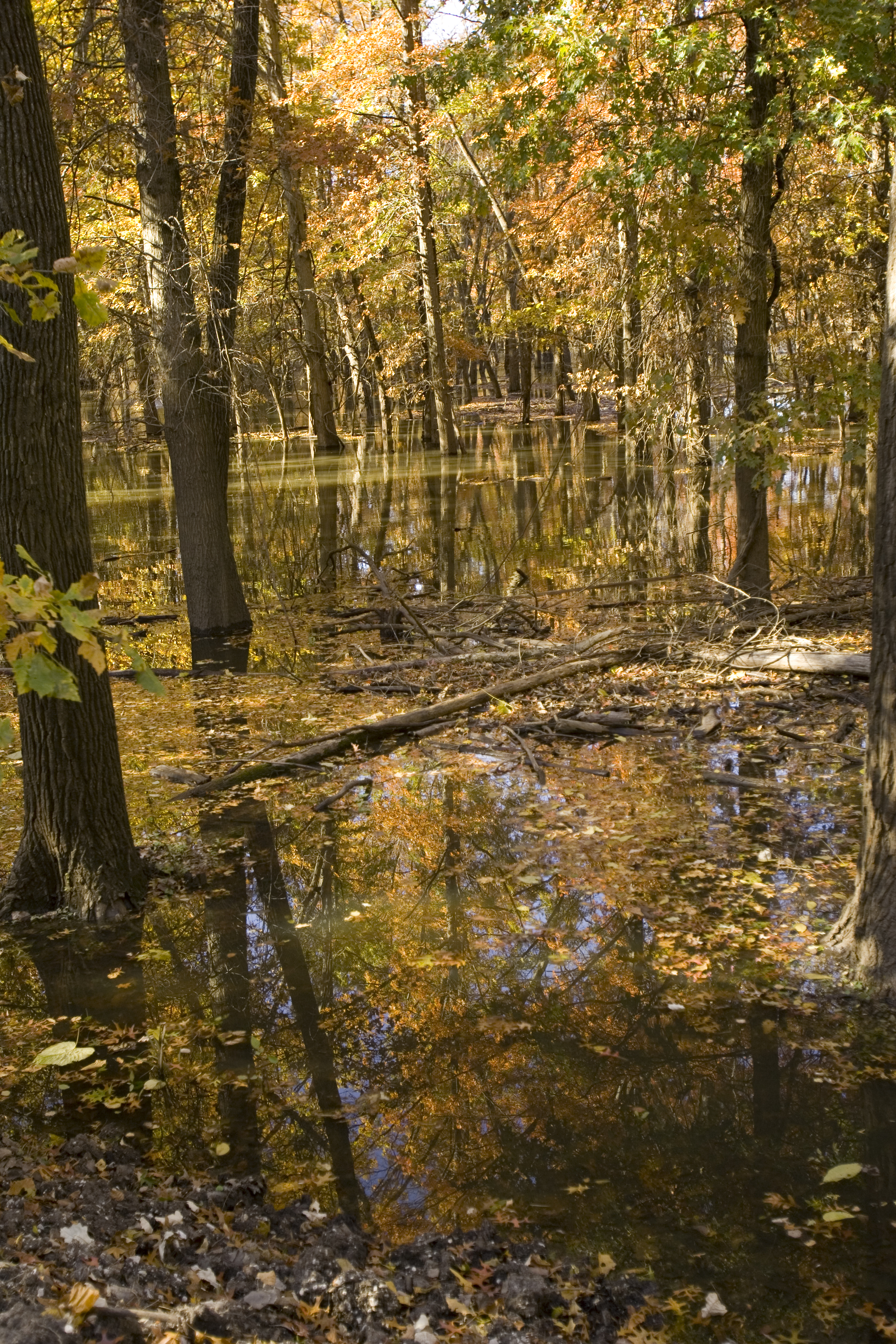
- Autumn trees standing in water in the refuge

- Location within the United States
- Location: Chariton County, Missouri, United States
- Nearest city: Sumner, Missouri
- Coordinates: 39°36′11″N 93°10′44″W
- Area: 10,795 acres (43.69 km^{2})
- Established: 1937
- Governing body: U.S. Fish and Wildlife Service
- Website: Swan Lake National Wildlife Refuge

Swan Lake National Wildlife Refuge is a 10,795-acre (43.69 km^{2}) National Wildlife Refuge established in 1937 and located in Chariton County, Missouri, 2 miles (3.2 km) south of the town of Sumner. It is located near the confluence of the Grand and Missouri Rivers.

Following the purchase of the land, the Civilian Conservation Corps began work on the refuge creating wetlands, constructing roads and buildings, and initiating the refuge farming program.

The primary purpose of the refuge is to provide nesting, resting, and feeding areas for waterfowl, primarily ducks. Two hundred and forty-one avian species have been observed residing on or passing through the refuge; another fourteen birds, listed under accidentals on the bird list, have been reported but are not normally expected to be present. An important secondary purpose was to preserve a remnant flock of prairie chickens. However, adequate grassland habitat to maintain a viable population of these birds was not available.

Since establishment of the refuge, the primary emphasis on waterfowl species has been expanded to include the Eastern Prairie Population of Canada geese. Canada geese were first observed using the refuge in the early 1940s, and numbers increased gradually to peak populations over 200,000 birds annually. Although these populations have steadily declined, Swan Lake is still considered a primary wintering area for Canada geese.
