= Bee Branch Creek (California) =

Stream in California

Location
- State: California
- County: Mendocino

Physical characteristics
- Mouth: Alder Creek
  - coordinates: 39°25′58″N 123°17′12″W

Bee Branch Creek is a stream in the U.S. state of California. It is in Mendocino County. It is a tributary of Alder Creek.
