= Snyder High School =

Snyder High School may refer to:

- Henry Snyder High School in Jersey City, New Jersey
- Bishop John J. Snyder High School in Jacksonville, Florida
- Snyder High School (Texas) in Snyder, Texas

== See also ==
- Snider High School
