= Hampden Township =

Hampden Township may refer to the following townships in the United States:

- Hampden Township, Cumberland County, Pennsylvania
- Hampden Township, Kittson County, Minnesota
- Hampden Township, Coffey County, Kansas

== See also ==
- Hampton Township, Allegheny County, Pennsylvania
