= Clark Creek (Elkhorn River tributary) =

Stream in Nebraska, U.S.

Coordinates: 41.5961076°N 96.4716911°W

Clark Creek is a stream in Washington, Dodge, and Burt counties, Nebraska, in the United States. It is a tributary of the Elkhorn River.

Clark was named for M. H. Clark, a politician of the Nebraska Territory.

== See also ==
- List of rivers of Nebraska
