= Hamden, Missouri =

Unincorporated community in the US state of Missouri

Coordinates: 39°34′38″N 92°49′24″W

Hamden is an unincorporated community in Chariton County, in the U.S. state of Missouri.

== History ==
A post office called Hamden was established in 1874, and remained in operation until 1953. The source of the name Hamden is obscure.
