= Bee Branch (Cobb Creek tributary) =

Stream in Missouri, U.S.

Bee Branch is a stream in the Laclede County in the Ozarks of southern Missouri. It is a tributary of North Cobb Creek. The headwaters are at 37°39′39″N 92°35′06″W and the confluence with North Cobb Creek is at 37°37′00″N 92°29′58″W.

Bee Branch was so named on account of honeybees in the area.

== See also ==
- List of rivers of Missouri
