= Bee Branch (South Fork Blackwater River tributary) =

Stream in Missouri, U.S.

Coordinates: 39°30′35″N 92°49′50″W

Bee Branch is a stream in Johnson and Pettis counties of the U.S. state of Missouri. It is a tributary of South Fork Blackwater River.

Bee Branch was so named on account of honeybees near its course.

== See also ==
- List of rivers of Missouri
