= Hampden & Co. =

UK independent private bank

Hampden & Co plc (trading as Hampden Bank)
- Industry: Banking
- Founded: 18 June 2015; 11 years ago in United Kingdom
- Headquarters: Edinburgh, Scotland, UK
- Number of locations: 3 (Edinburgh, London, Manchester)
- Area served: United Kingdom
- Products: Day-to-day banking, deposits and lending.
- Number of employees: 162 (December 2025)
- Website: www.hampdenbank.com

Hampden & Co. (trading as Hampden Bank) is a British independent private bank for high-net-worth individuals, their families and businesses. The bank has offices in Edinburgh and London. In 2025, the bank expanded to serve clients in the North and Midlands.

== History ==
Hampden Bank was incorporated on 12 October 2010, under the temporary name of “Scoban”. The company changed its name to “Hampden & Co” on 18 June 2015 prior to opening and was the first of its kind to launch in the United Kingdom in 30 years.

In March 2024, the company rebranded as Hampden Bank.

The name “Hampden” reflects one of their major shareholders, the Hampden Group.

== Board and investors ==
As an independent private bank, Hampden Bank is backed by four cornerstone shareholders and hundreds of smaller investors who collectively raised over £60m in capital for the 2015 launch. Of the four cornerstone investors, one is The Hampden Group, which is a family owned company, focusing on insurance and financial services sectors. Its key areas of operation are in Lloyd's Members' Agency services, underwriting, insurance company administration, bespoke Run-Off insurance management, audit, tax and consultancy services.

Hampden Bank is headed by CEO Tracey Davidson, formerly Deputy Chief Executive at Handelsbanken plc, and David Huntley, who became Chair of the Board in September 2025.

Hampden Bank's other board members are:

- David Huntley – Chair
- Caroline Taylor – Non-executive Director
- Finlay Williamson – Non-executive Director
- Angus Macpherson - Non-executive Director
- Jonathan Peake – Finance Director

== Services and affiliations ==
Hampden Bank provides day-to-day banking services, including current accounts, bank cards, digital banking and foreign exchange services, deposit accounts, and bespoke lending, including residential, retirement, family (guarantor), self-build, buy-to-let and multi-property mortgages.

In 2018, Hampden Bank entered the intermediary mortgage market to offer services to many high-net-worth clients who use mortgage brokers to arrange their property finance.

In January 2019, the bank launched a mobile banking app to add digital banking services.

In 2025, the bank announced that total deposits had surpassed £1 billion.
