= Lagonda, Missouri =

Unincorporated community in Missouri, U.S.

Coordinates: 39°39′25″N 92°43′59″W

Lagonda is an unincorporated community in Chariton County, in the U.S. state of Missouri.

== History ==
A post office called Lagonda was established in 1881, and remained in operation until 1922. The origin of the name Lagonda is obscure.
