= Forest Green, Missouri =

Unincorporated community in Missouri, U.S.

Coordinates: 39°18′54″N 92°50′16″W

Forest Green is an unincorporated community in southeastern Chariton County, Missouri, United States. It is located approximately eight miles south of Salisbury on Route 5.

Forest Green was platted in 1873 by John Green Forest, and most likely was named for the proprietor. A post office called Forest Green was established in 1873, and remained in operation until 1979.
