= 1st Viscount Hampden =

1st Viscount Hampden may refer to:

- Robert Hampden-Trevor, 1st Viscount Hampden, 4th Baron Trevor (1706–1783)
- Henry Bouverie William Brand, 1st Viscount Hampden (1814–1892)

== See also ==
- Viscount Hampden
