= Elliott Tool Technologies =

Oldest known photograph of the employees of the Gustav Wiedeke Company, Predecessor of the Elliott Company in Ohio

Elliott Tool Technologies was founded in September 1892 by an inventor and manufacturer named Gustav Wiedeke in his Dayton, Ohio home. He began designing and manufacturing specialized tools for servicing heat exchangers and water-tube boilers.

== History ==
After Wiedeke's death in 1910, his two sons continued to produce tube tools for the major industries of that era; power plants, steam engines, and refineries. The Wiedeke business continued to operate as a family enterprise for the next 32 years. By this time, Wiedeke products had earned worldwide recognition for innovative tubing tool designs and Wiedeke tools are still in active circulation.

In the first decade of the 20th century, several companies emerged in the tube tool industry to fulfill the growing demand as the US transitioned into an emerging industrial economy.

The Lagonda Manufacturing Company in Springfield, Ohio became a direct competitor to the Wiedeke brothers. At the same time, William Elliott recognized the need and opportunity for efficient tube cleaning equipment and founded the Liberty Manufacturing Company in Jeannette, Pennsylvania.

In 1916, William Elliott acquired Lagonda and fused the two companies into the Elliott Company, continuing to operate both plants in Ohio and Pennsylvania. By the late 1960s, Elliott Company enjoyed a worldwide reputation for its tube cleaning and turbomachinery products. The Elliott company acquired the Gustav Wiedeke Company, at the time its major competitor, in 1969, and combined the two leading tube tool manufacturers into one entity.

The 1970s and early 1980s were successful for the Elliott Company's Dayton and Springfield plant due to increasing market demand. In 1986, the growth led to the creation of the Industrial Tool Division which encompassed the Dayton and Springfield plants. The Jeannette plant was organized into the Elliott Turbomachinary Company. In 1996, the Elliott Company decided to focus solely on steam turbine manufacturing and sold the tube tool division to its senior managers. The current company of Elliott Tool Technologies is the net result. Elliott Tool Technologies has support in many regional areas of the United States and around the world. These sales channels provide sales support, review of customer applications and training. Thermal Solutions, Inc is Elliott Tool's local representative for the Eastern Pennsylvania, New Jersey, and Delaware.
