= Prairie Hill, Missouri =

Unincorporated community in Missouri, US

- Census-Designated Place
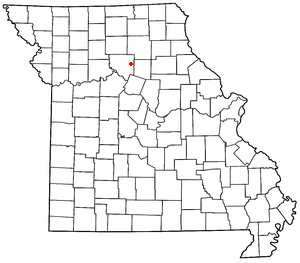
- Location of Prairie Hill in Missouri
- Coordinates: 39°31′15″N 92°44′10″W
- Country: United States
- State: Missouri
- County: Chariton

Area
  - Total: 0.46 sq mi (1.19 km^{2})
  - Land: 0.46 sq mi (1.19 km^{2})
  - Water: 0 sq mi (0.00 km^{2})
- Elevation: 725 ft (221 m)

Population (2020)
  - Total: 50
  - Density: 109.1/sq mi (42.12/km^{2})
- FIPS code: 29-59708
- GNIS feature ID: 2806390

Prairie Hill is an unincorporated community in eastern Chariton County, Missouri, United States. The community is located at the intersection of Missouri routes W and HH approximately seven miles north-northeast of Salisbury. The Thomas Hill Reservoir dam is seven miles (11 km) to the northeast in adjacent Randolph County.

A post office called Prairie Hill was established in 1869, and remained in operation until 1966. The community was named for its elevated location upon a prairie.

== Demographics ==
Historical population
Census	Pop.	Note	%±
2020	50		—
U.S. Decennial Census

Prairie Hill first appeared as a census designated place in the 2020 U.S. census.
