= Triplet Lakes =

Three lakes in the state of Minnesota, United States

Coordinates: 47°9′35″N 95°13′41″W

Triplet Lakes is a group of lakes in Clearwater County, Minnesota, in the United States.

The group consists of three small lakes, hence the name.

== See also ==
- List of lakes in Minnesota
