= Perry Township, Michigan =

- Civil township
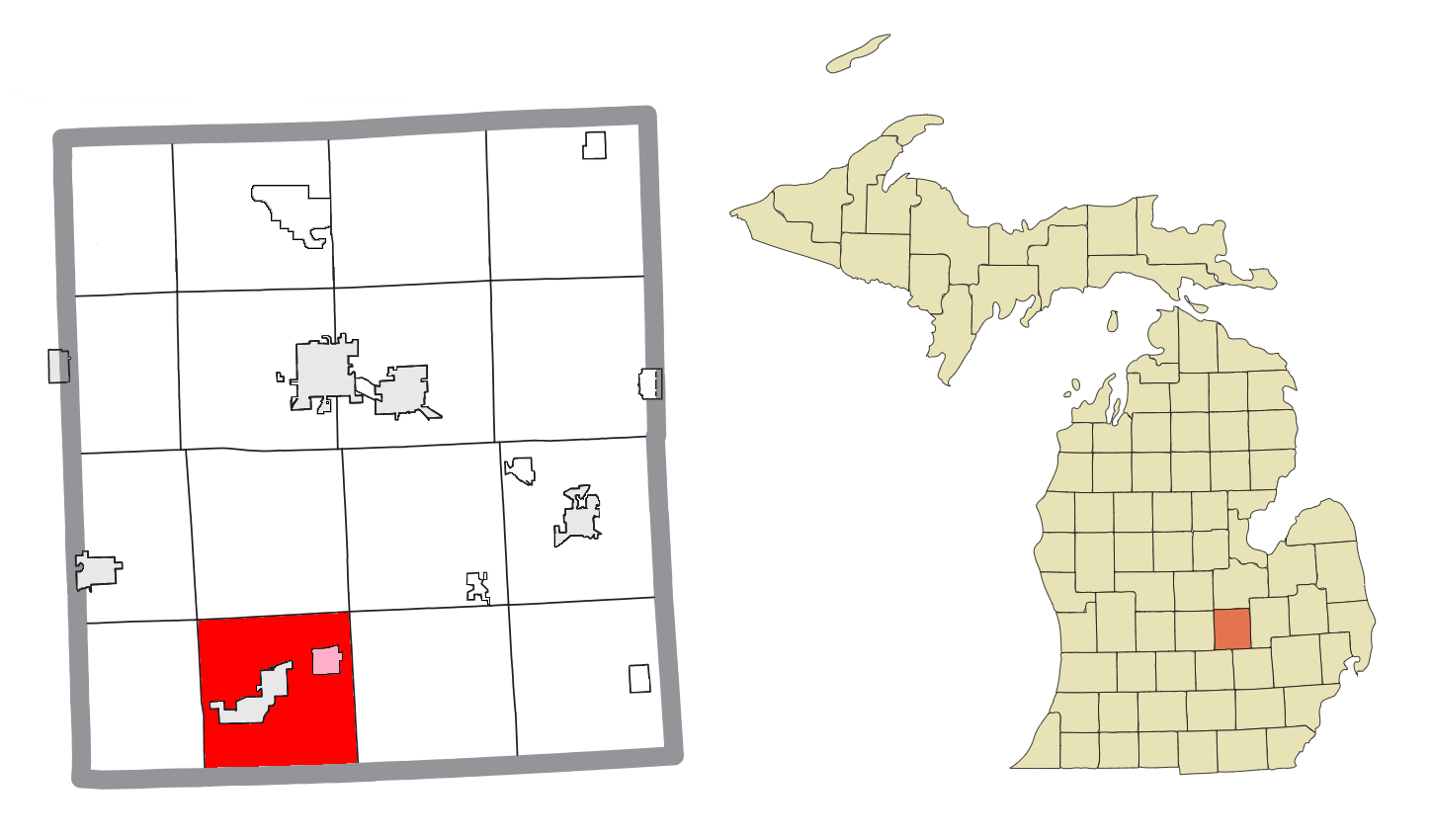
- Location within Shiawassee County (red) and the administered village of Morrice (pink)

- Location within the state of Michigan Perry Township (the United States)
- Coordinates: 42°50′03″N 84°13′13″W
- Country: United States
- State: Michigan
- County: Shiawassee
- Organized: 1841

Government
  - Supervisor: Mark Fulks
  - Clerk: Kelly Schmidt

Area
  - Total: 31.63 sq mi (81.9 km^{2})
  - Land: 31.14 sq mi (80.7 km^{2})
  - Water: 0.49 sq mi (1.3 km^{2})
- Elevation: 890 ft (270 m)

Population (2020)
  - Total: 4,141
  - Density: 133.0/sq mi (51.34/km^{2})
- Time zone: UTC-5 (Eastern (EST))
  - Summer (DST): UTC-4 (EDT)
- ZIP code(s): 48857 (Morrice); 48872 (Perry)
- Area code: 517
- FIPS code: 26-63720
- GNIS feature ID: 1626896
- Website: Official website

Perry Township is a civil township of Shiawassee County in the U.S. state of Michigan. The population was 4,141 at the 2020 census. The township surrounds the city of Perry, but the two are administered autonomously. Perry Township was organized in 1841.

== Communities ==
- Forest Green Estates is an unincorporated community in the township, south of Bath Road and north of the railroads from Beardslee Road to the western township border.42°48′54″N 84°16′13″W
- Morrice is a village within the township.

== Geography ==
According to the United States Census Bureau, the township has a total area of 31.63 square miles (81.9 km^{2}), of which 31.14 square miles (80.7 km^{2}) is land and 0.49 square miles (1.3 km^{2}) (1.55%) is water.

== Demographics ==
As of the census of 2000, there were 4,438 people, 1,568 households, and 1,221 families residing in the township. The population density was 139.4 inhabitants per square mile (53.8/km^{2}). There were 1,664 housing units at an average density of 52.3 per square mile (20.2/km^{2}). The racial makeup of the township was 97.30% White, 0.29% African American, 0.43% Native American, 0.23% Asian, 0.07% Pacific Islander, 0.23% from other races, and 1.46% from two or more races. Hispanic or Latino of any race were 1.28% of the population.

There were 1,568 households, out of which 42.0% had children under the age of 18 living with them, 61.9% were married couples living together, 10.8% had a female householder with no husband present, and 22.1% were non-families. 16.9% of all households were made up of individuals, and 5.5% had someone living alone who was 65 years of age or older. The average household size was 2.83 and the average family size was 3.16.

In the township the population was spread out, with 30.2% under the age of 18, 8.5% from 18 to 24, 32.2% from 25 to 44, 21.5% from 45 to 64, and 7.6% who were 65 years of age or older. The median age was 33 years. For every 100 females, there were 96.6 males. For every 100 females age 18 and over, there were 94.8 males.

The median income for a household in the township was $50,783, and the median income for a family was $56,809. Males had a median income of $41,905 versus $25,885 for females. The per capita income for the township was $20,744. About 4.9% of families and 5.9% of the population were below the poverty line, including 8.9% of those under age 18 and 5.0% of those age 65 or over.

== Highways ==
- I-69
- M-52
