= Mike, Missouri =

Unincorporated community in Missouri

Coordinates: 39°35′47″N 92°57′27″W

Mike is an unincorporated community in Chariton County, in the U.S. state of Missouri.

The community is on Missouri Route 5 approximately midway between Keytesville to the south and Marceline in adjacent Linn County to the north.

== History ==
A post office called Mike was established in 1890, and remained in operation until 1906. The community most likely has the name of a resident.
