= Clarks Creek (Kansas) =

Stream in Geary and Morris County, Kansas U.S.

Coordinates: 39.088887°N 96.711395°W

Clarks Creek is a stream in Geary and Morris counties, Kansas in the United States.

Clarks Creek was named in honor of members of the Lewis and Clark Expedition who camped near its banks.

== See also ==
- List of rivers of Kansas
