= Hampden Park (disambiguation) =

Hampden Park is a football stadium in Glasgow.

It may also refer to:

- Hampden Park (1873–83), the original Hampden Park stadium in Glasgow
- Cathkin Park, the second Hampden Park stadium in Glasgow, later renamed
- Hampden Park, Eastbourne, a suburb of Eastbourne
  - home to Hampden Park railway station
- Pynchon Park, a sports venue in Springfield, Massachusetts, also known as Hampden Park
- Veterans Park (Holyoke, Massachusetts), a park in Holyoke originally known as Hampden Park
