= Grand River (Missouri) =

Stream in Iowa and Missouri in the United States

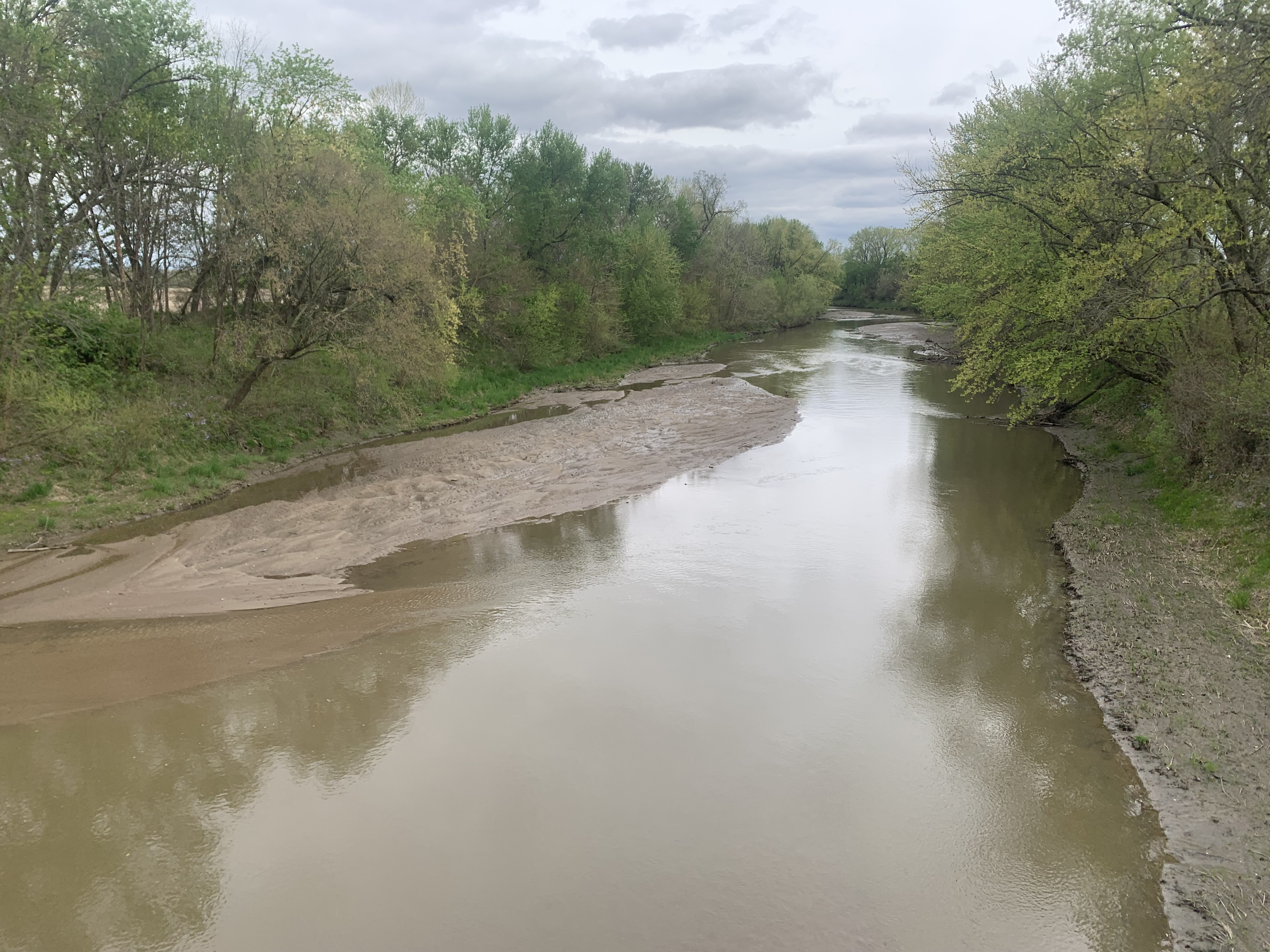
- Grand River at Route O in Gentry County, Missouri

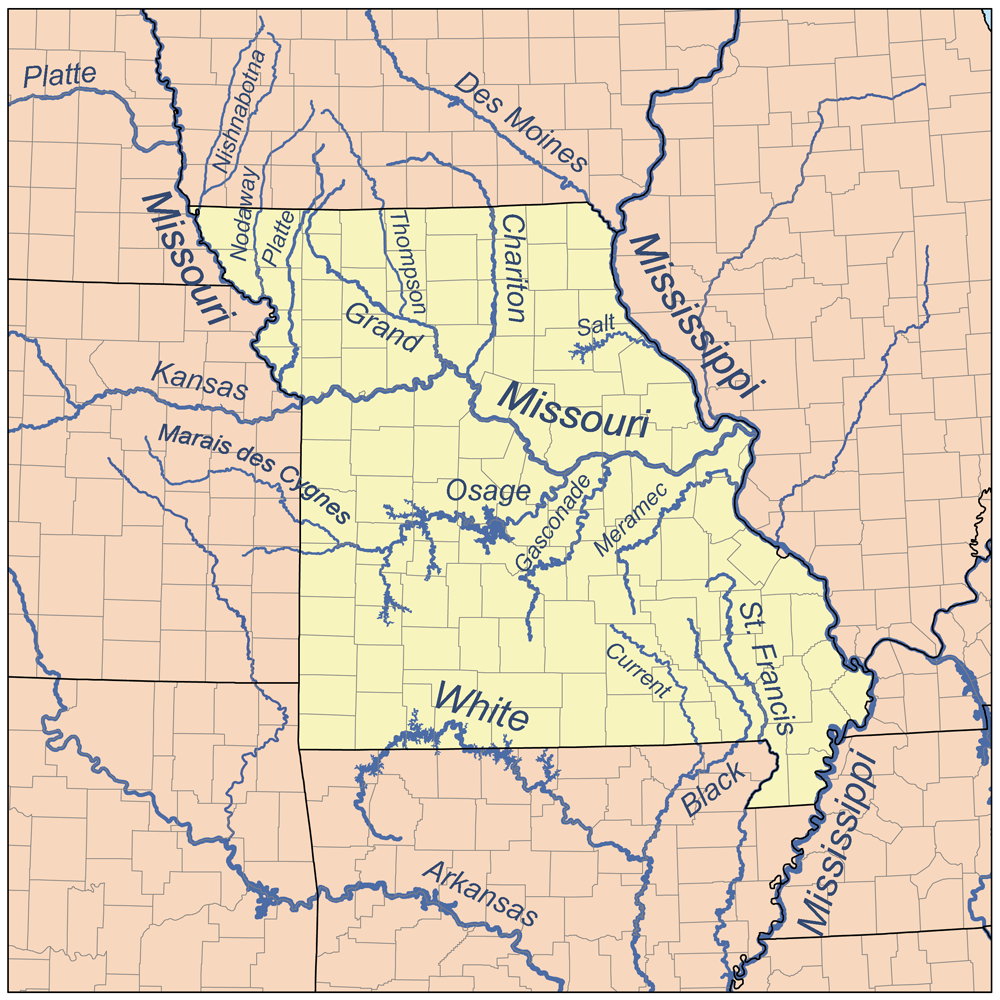
- Major Missouri rivers

Location
- Country: US
- State: Iowa, Missouri

Physical characteristics
- Source
  - location: Creston, Iowa, US
  - coordinates: 41.025°N 94.268°W
- Mouth: Missouri River
  - location: Brunswick, Missouri, US
  - coordinates: 39.384°N 93.108°W
  - elevation: 620 ft (190 m)
- Discharge
  - location: Sumner, MO
  - average: 4,288 cu/ft. per sec.

The Grand River is a river that stretches from northernmost tributary origins between Creston and Winterset in Iowa approximately 226 miles (364 km) to its mouth on the Missouri River near Brunswick, Missouri.

Its watershed of 7,900 square miles (20,000 km^{2}), with three-quarters in Missouri, makes it the largest watershed serving the Missouri River in northern Missouri.

== History ==
Fort D'Orleans was erected by French explorer Étienne de Veniard, Sieur de Bourgmont which is believed to have been at the mouth of the Grand on Missouri River in 1723 (the French named the river "La Grande Riviére"). The fort was abandoned in 1726 and has been obliterated by floods.

The area was part of Iowa people tribal territory through the 1820s. The Iowa chief Big Neck (aka Great Walker) had his village on the Grand River before 1824 and into 1829.

=== Big Neck War ===
In July 1829, a large party of Iowa people, led by Chief Big Neck, returned to their former hunting grounds in violation of treaty. One of the Iowa's dogs killed a pig and they threatened (or insulted, according to some sources) the white women. The settlers sent messengers south to Randolph and Macon counties asking for help. Captain William Trammell responded with a party of some two dozen men to help. By the time of their arrival, the Iowa had left the area and moved upriver into what is now Schuyler County. Trammell's force, augmented by several of the men from The Cabins, pursued and engaged the Iowa at a place called Battle Creek, killing several Native Americans including Big Neck's brother, sister-in-law, and their child. The Trammell party lost three men in the skirmish, including Captain Trammell himself, and one additional casualty died of his wounds shortly afterward. Discretion being the better part of valor, the surviving whites returned to the cabins, collected the women and children, and headed south for the Randolph County settlement of Huntsville. Later, a group of militia under General John B. Clark pursued and apprehended Big Neck and his braves, capturing them in March 1830. Soon, several escaped from jail and fled to the current state of Iowa; however, Big Neck himself and the remainder were put on trial by a grand jury of Randolph County. The jury found on March 31, 1830, that: "After examining all the witnesses, and maturely considering the charges for which these Iowa Indians are now in confinement, we find them not guilty, and they are at once discharged." The acquittal of Big Neck seemed to have brought the war to a peaceful, if uneasy, conclusion. A few months later, white settlers returned to The Cabins, this time in greater numbers, and this time to stay permanently.

In 1835 the Missouri Legislature declared it a navigable stream to the Iowa line, although steamboat traffic never extended much further than Chillicothe. Even then boats had difficulty with the river's changing water levels, and sometimes it was too low for them to travel that far upriver. The town of Bedford is named for a steamer that sank there.

== Geography ==
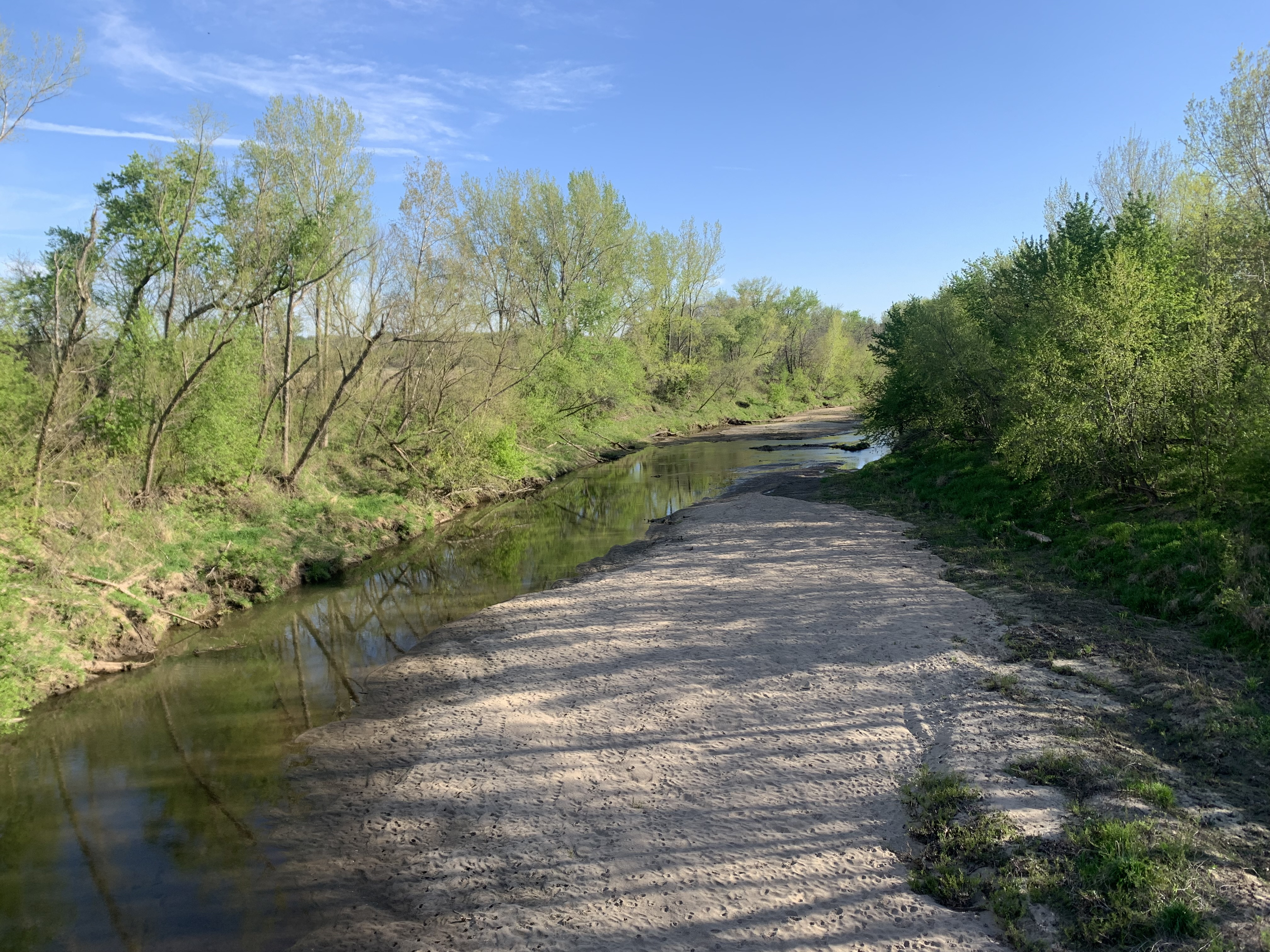
The Grand River from County Highway J55 west of Redding, Iowa

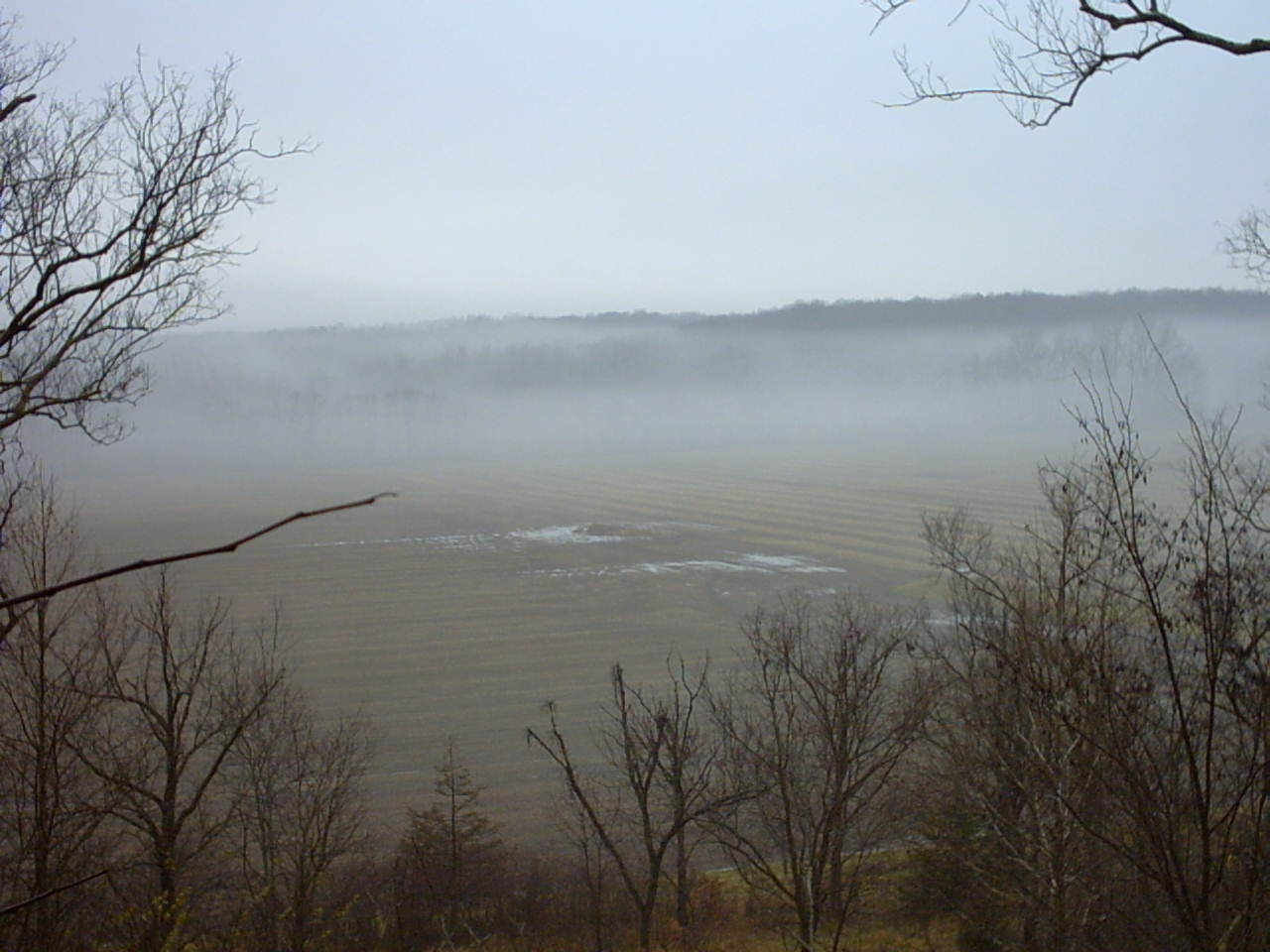
Bluffs above the Grand at Adam-ondi-Ahman

The West and East Forks of the Grand rise just south of Creston in Union County, Iowa. The Middle Fork rises at Mount Ayr, Iowa in Ringgold County, Iowa. The three forks merge just south of Albany, Missouri in Gentry County. That is where the river officially assumes the single Grand River name.

The biggest confluence of streams is at Chillicothe, where the Thompson River and Shoal, Medicine, and Locust creeks merge with the river. The Grand River Basin has more than 1,000 third order or higher streams. Swan Lake National Wildlife Refuge is on the Yellow Creek tributary at Sumner, Missouri.

No dams have been built on the river. At various times plans have been proposed for five dams, with the most prominent being the Pattonsburg Dam at Pattonsburg, Missouri. The United States Corps of Engineers bought out the residents after the Great Flood of 1993; but, the proposed dam has not been authorized.

Average discharge for the Grand at Sumner, Missouri is 3,917 cubic feet per second (110.9 m^{3}/s). The maximum instantaneous peak flow of 180,000 cubic feet per second (5,100 m^{3}/s) occurred in June, 1947. During the 1993 flood 150,000 cubic feet per second (4,200 m^{3}/s) was reported at Sumner.

The Grand descends at a rate of about three feet per mile (0.5 m/km), although the Pop's Branch near Princeton, Missouri descends at 44 feet per mile (8 m/km).

== See also ==
- List of rivers of Iowa
- List of rivers of Missouri
