= Bee Branch (Bridge Creek tributary) =

Stream in Missouri, U.S.

Coordinates: 40°20′34″N 92°20′15″W

Bee Branch is a stream in northeast Adair and southwest Scotland counties of the U.S. state of Missouri. It is a tributary of Bridge Creek.

Bee Branch was so named on account of honeybees in the area.

== See also ==
- List of rivers of Missouri
