= Triplett Run =

Stream in West Virginia, U.S.

Coordinates: 38°51′02″N 81°14′29″W

Triplett Run is a stream in the U.S. state of West Virginia.

Triplett Run most likely was named after William Triplett, a pioneer settler.

== See also ==
- List of rivers of West Virginia
