= Shannondale, Chariton County, Missouri =

Inactive township in the US state of Missouri

Coordinates: 39°21′33″N 92°51′00″W

Shannondale is an unincorporated community in Chariton County, in the U.S. state of Missouri.

== History ==
Shannondale was platted in 1874 by Charles Shannon, and named for him. A post office called Shannondale was established in 1874, and remained in operation until 1915.
