= Schneider =

Schneider may refer to:

The One Who Flys

== Companies and organizations ==
- G. Schneider & Sohn, a Bavarian brewery company
- Schneider Rundfunkwerke AG, the former owner of the Dual brand of record players
  - Schneider Computer Division, a brand of Amstrad CPC in association with Schneider Rundfunkwerke AG
- Schneider-Creusot, a historic French iron and steel-mill which became a major arms manufacturer; a predecessor of Schneider Electric
- Schneider Electric, a French industrial company
- Schneider-Empain, later known as Schneider Group SA, French-Belgian industrial grouping, organised by Édouard-Jean Empain
- Schneider Foods, a Canadian meat producer founded in Kitchener, Ontario, now owned by Maple Leaf Foods since 2003
- Schneider Kreuznach, a German manufacturer of industrial and photographic optics
- Schneider National, an American trucking company

== Places ==
- Schneider, Indiana, a town in Lake County
- Schneider Township, Buffalo County, Nebraska

== Other uses ==
- Schneider (surname)
- Schneider (beer), an Argentinian brand of beer
- Schneider (cards), a low point score in card games like Skat or Sheepshead which boosts the opponent's game score
- Schneider CA1, a French World War I tank
- Schneider Children's Medical Center of Israel
- Schneider Trophy, a prize for seaplanes
- Schneider (fish), a common name of the fish Alburnoides bipunctatus
- Schneider (727)

== See also ==
- Justice Schneider (disambiguation)
