= Mussel Fork =

Stream in the US state of Missouri

Mussel Fork is a stream in Adair, Chariton, Linn, Macon and Sullivan counties in the U.S. state of Missouri. It is a tributary to the Chariton River.

The stream headwaters arise just northeast of Green City in Sullivan County at 40°17′19″N 92°57′02″W. The stream flows south to southeast entering the southwest corner of Adair County and into northwest Macon County. The stream flows south along the western border of Macon County passing east of the community of New Boston. The stream enters the southeast corner of Linn County as it crosses under U. S. Route 36 east of Bucklin. It passes into Chariton County four miles east of Marceline. It continues to the south passing under U.S. Route 24 on the west side of Keytesville to its confluence with the Chariton three miles south of Keytesville at 39°23′55″N 92°55′02″W.

Mussel Fork was named for the river mussels along its course.

== See also ==
- List of rivers of Missouri
