= Brunswick, Missouri =

- City

- Location of Brunswick, Missouri
- Coordinates: 39°25′25″N 93°7′44″W
- Country: United States
- State: Missouri
- County: Chariton

Area
  - Total: 1.25 sq mi (3.24 km^{2})
  - Land: 1.20 sq mi (3.11 km^{2})
  - Water: 0.050 sq mi (0.13 km^{2})
- Elevation: 650 ft (200 m)

Population (2020)
  - Total: 801
  - Density: 666.1/sq mi (257.19/km^{2})
- Time zone: UTC-6 (Central (CST))
  - Summer (DST): UTC-5 (CDT)
- ZIP code: 65236
- Area code: 660
- FIPS code: 29-09046
- GNIS feature ID: 2393445

Brunswick is a city in Chariton County, Missouri, United States. Its population was 801 at the 2020 census. Brunswick, by official state proclamation, is the Pecan Capital of Missouri. The Missouri Farmers Association (MFA Incorporated) was founded in Brunswick in 1914.

== History ==
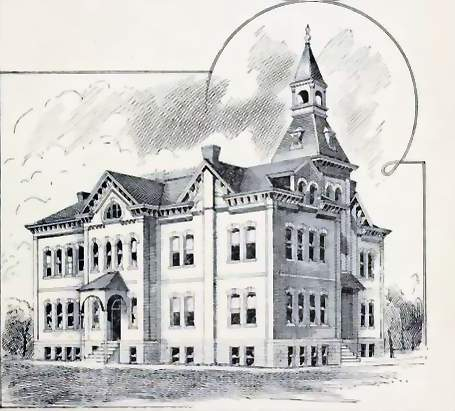
Brunswick school constructed in 1871. It served until the early 1930s

For thousands of years varying cultures of indigenous peoples settled by the Missouri River. At the time of European contact, historical tribes in the area included the Missouri, Osage, Kaw, Otoe and others. In 1723 Etienne de Veniard, Sieur de Bourgmont built Fort Orleans near here, established on the Missouri River near the mouth of the Grand River. It was occupied 1723-1726 as the first multi-year European fort and settlement in present-day Missouri. It was to be a trading centerpiece of La Louisiane, the new territory claimed by the French.

Following the Louisiana Purchase and the end of the French colonial period the area saw a large influx of immigrants from the U.S., especially Kentucky and Tennessee. They brought African-American slaves and slaveholding traditions with them. The new land owners planted and cultivate crops similar to those in the Upper South: hemp and tobacco. Chariton was one of several counties along the Missouri River to become known as Little Dixie.

The original town of Brunswick was laid out in 1836 by James Keyte. Keyte, an English immigrant and Methodist minister, was also the founder of Keytesville, Missouri, the county seat of Chariton County. The original town plat was about 500 yards (457 meters) south of its current location, but due to changes in the Missouri and Grand rivers, the location is now underwater. A Mr. Keyte established the first store in the town, and its first industry, a sawmill. Early growth was slow for the community, with the population estimated at around 125 citizens by 1840. However, in the early 1840s a large influx of new residents increased the size of the town and scope of business offerings. They included a hotel, a wagon maker, brick factory, and a pork packing facility. Doctor Edwin Price, brother of famed Confederate general Sterling Price, was an early settler. In the decades leading up to the American Civil War surrounding counties had no railroad over which to ship or receive goods and crops, thus Brunswick with its steamboat access, became a regional trading center. In 1849 Brunswick recorded 534 arrivals and departures by steamboats. The first school was established at Brunswick in June 1840 with approximately thirty-five students and a one-room log schoolhouse. It was also in 1840 that the first wave of German immigrants arrived in the Brunswick area. Another influx of Germans took place in 1842. The Brunswicker, the town's first newspaper, began publication in October 1847 and continues today, making it one of the state's oldest. Brunswick's first bank, a branch of the Merchants Bank of St. Louis, opened.

After the Civil War and the loss of their slaves, farmers shifted to other less labor-intensive, crops. However, in 1880 Chariton County still led the state of Missouri in tobacco production, with 14 million pounds harvested. After nearly ten years of delay due to the war, the railroad finally reached Brunswick in 1867, reducing the reliance on steamboats to transport goods and people.

Dr. W.W. Bowen established the Brunswick Institute of Pharmacy in 1910. The school would train more than 5,000 pharmacists and druggists before closing in 1937. In 1914, farmers organized the Missouri Farmers Association (MFA), a cooperative, based in Brunswick. It has since moved to Columbia, Missouri. Brunswick saw a growth of industry through the mid-20th century, with the construction of an alfalfa-drying plant constructed in 1939, the Chariton Electric Company in 1958, in 1965 the opening of the Tuloma Fertilizer blending plant, and in 1970 a glove factory. Also in 1965 the U.S. Coast Guard built a small base near Brunswick to service increased river traffic; however, the facility was relatively short-lived, closing in March 1973.

Following World War II, Brunswick became the center of an area of pecan groves. In 1972 State Representative Creason secured a state resolution naming Brunswick the Pecan Capital of Missouri. The Brunswick Pecan Festival was first held in 1980, celebrating the large number of pecans being harvested in the area. It would become an annual tradition that is held each October. The world's largest 20th-century pecan—a concrete replica—is located along Highway 24 in downtown Brunswick. It measures seven by twelve feet and weighs twelve thousand pounds. It was constructed in 1982 by George James in honor of the Starking Hardy Giant pecan, which he discovered on his property in 1947.

Locust Hill was listed on the National Register of Historic Places in 1980.

== Education ==
Schools in the Brunswick area date back to 1840, when a small one-room log "subscription" or private school was constructed. Following the Civil War, attention turned more toward public education, with the first public school opening in the town circa 1868. A large three-story brick school was constructed in 1871 and served the community well into the early 20th century, being replaced by a new school in 1930–31. The present junior high / high school building used by Brunswick R-II school district was constructed in 1956–57. The most recent addition to the facilities is a new grade school constructed in 1991–1992. In 1949 Missouri reorganized public education, with the state board of education consolidating or reorganizing many small rural schools into larger districts, this gave birth to the aforementioned Brunswick R-II district. The district, in student count, is the second largest in Chariton County, trailing Salisbury schools. Enrollment in all grades from 2006 to 2010 averaged 250 students. The school colors are red and black. Their mascot is the Wildcat. Brunswick R-II participates in sports and other activities as a Class 1A school under guidelines from the Missouri State High School Activities Association.

The town has a lending library, the Brunswick Area Public Library.

== Notable people ==
- John B. Hale, U.S. House Representative from Missouri, Civil War Colonel
- Darold Knowles—Former MLB relief pitcher. First pitcher to ever appear in all seven games of a World Series. The baseball field at Brunswick R-II school is named in his honor.
- Wayne E. Meyer—U.S. Navy admiral, "Father of the Aegis weapons system".
- W. James Morgan—Union Army officer, responsible for the Burning of Platte City during the American Civil War.
- Sol Smith Russell—Comic stage actor of the late 19th century. Russell Opera House in Brunswick is named for him.
- Wilbur Sweatman -- Ragtime and Dixieland jazz composer and performer.

== Geography ==
Brunswick is located at 39°25′25″N 93°7′44″W (39.423563, -93.128819).

According to the United States Census Bureau, the city has a total area of 1.25 square miles (3.24 km^{2}), of which 1.20 square miles (3.11 km^{2}) is land and 0.05 square miles (0.13 km^{2}) is water.

=== Climate ===
Climate data for Brunswick, Missouri (1991–2020 normals, extremes 1890–2017)
Month	Jan	Feb	Mar	Apr	May	Jun	Jul	Aug	Sep	Oct	Nov	Dec	Year
Record high °F (°C)	74 (23)	82 (28)	92 (33)	97 (36)	104 (40)	108 (42)	114 (46)	113 (45)	104 (40)	98 (37)	88 (31)	76 (24)	114 (46)
Mean maximum °F (°C)	57.8 (14.3)	66.4 (19.1)	77.1 (25.1)	83.8 (28.8)	86.7 (30.4)	91.3 (32.9)	94.6 (34.8)	95.3 (35.2)	90.5 (32.5)	83.9 (28.8)	72.8 (22.7)	61.4 (16.3)	96.8 (36.0)
Mean daily maximum °F (°C)	36.1 (2.3)	41.4 (5.2)	53.4 (11.9)	64.5 (18.1)	73.6 (23.1)	82.9 (28.3)	86.8 (30.4)	85.2 (29.6)	78.6 (25.9)	67.0 (19.4)	52.8 (11.6)	40.5 (4.7)	63.6 (17.6)
Daily mean °F (°C)	27.8 (−2.3)	32.3 (0.2)	43.3 (6.3)	54.0 (12.2)	64.3 (17.9)	73.7 (23.2)	77.7 (25.4)	75.8 (24.3)	68.1 (20.1)	56.4 (13.6)	43.5 (6.4)	32.4 (0.2)	54.1 (12.3)
Mean daily minimum °F (°C)	19.5 (−6.9)	23.3 (−4.8)	33.3 (0.7)	43.5 (6.4)	54.9 (12.7)	64.6 (18.1)	68.7 (20.4)	66.5 (19.2)	57.7 (14.3)	45.9 (7.7)	34.2 (1.2)	24.3 (−4.3)	44.7 (7.1)
Mean minimum °F (°C)	−2.6 (−19.2)	1.4 (−17.0)	13.9 (−10.1)	26.1 (−3.3)	38.8 (3.8)	48.5 (9.2)	55.7 (13.2)	53.6 (12.0)	38.4 (3.6)	28.4 (−2.0)	16.5 (−8.6)	1.4 (−17.0)	−8.3 (−22.4)
Record low °F (°C)	−22 (−30)	−29 (−34)	−14 (−26)	11 (−12)	26 (−3)	37 (3)	48 (9)	42 (6)	29 (−2)	18 (−8)	−7 (−22)	−25 (−32)	−29 (−34)
Average precipitation inches (mm)	1.51 (38)	2.03 (52)	2.77 (70)	3.96 (101)	5.45 (138)	5.55 (141)	4.30 (109)	3.85 (98)	3.49 (89)	3.35 (85)	2.36 (60)	1.80 (46)	40.42 (1,027)
Average snowfall inches (cm)	4.0 (10)	4.9 (12)	1.1 (2.8)	0.0 (0.0)	0.0 (0.0)	0.0 (0.0)	0.0 (0.0)	0.0 (0.0)	0.0 (0.0)	0.0 (0.0)	0.1 (0.25)	2.1 (5.3)	12.2 (31)
Average precipitation days (≥ 0.01 in)	5.3	5.2	7.2	9.8	10.8	9.5	8.6	7.4	6.5	7.4	5.9	5.4	89.0
Average snowy days (≥ 0.1 in)	2.1	1.9	0.7	0.0	0.0	0.0	0.0	0.0	0.0	0.0	0.3	1.7	6.7
Source: NOAA (mean maxima/minima 1981–2010)

== Demographics ==
Historical population
Census	Pop.	Note	%±
1850	363		—
1870	1,645		—
1880	1,801		9.5%
1890	1,748		−2.9%
1900	1,403		−19.7%
1910	1,606		14.5%
1920	1,411		−12.1%
1930	1,715		21.5%
1940	1,749		2.0%
1950	1,653		−5.5%
1960	1,493		−9.7%
1970	1,370		−8.2%
1980	1,272		−7.2%
1990	1,074		−15.6%
2000	925		−13.9%
2010	858		−7.2%
2020	801		−6.6%
U.S. Decennial Census

=== 2010 census ===
As of the census of 2010, there were 858 people, 379 households, and 223 families residing in the city. The population density was 715.0 inhabitants per square mile (276.1/km^{2}). There were 491 housing units at an average density of 409.2 per square mile (158.0/km^{2}). The racial makeup of the city was 88.8% White, 9.1% African American, 0.1% Native American, 0.1% from other races, and 1.9% from two or more races. Hispanic or Latino of any race were 0.2% of the population.

There were 379 households, of which 25.3% had children under the age of 18 living with them, 40.1% were married couples living together, 14.5% had a female householder with no husband present, 4.2% had a male householder with no wife present, and 41.2% were non-families. 37.2% of all households were made up of individuals, and 20% had someone living alone who was 65 years of age or older. The average household size was 2.16 and the average family size was 2.77.

The median age in the city was 47.7 years. 22.5% of residents were under the age of 18; 6.9% were between the ages of 18 and 24; 17.9% were from 25 to 44; 25.2% were from 45 to 64; and 27.4% were 65 years of age or older. The gender makeup of the city was 48.0% male and 52.0% female.

=== 2000 census ===
As of the census of 2000, there were 925 people, 426 households, and 242 families residing in the city. The population density was 776.8 inhabitants per square mile (299.9/km^{2}). There were 536 housing units at an average density of 450.1 per square mile (173.8/km^{2}). The racial makeup of the city was 86.16% White, 13.30% African American, 0.32% from other races, and 0.22% from two or more races. Hispanic or Latino of any race were 0.86% of the population.

There were 426 households, out of which 20.9% had children under the age of 18 living with them, 44.6% were married couples living together, 9.4% had a female householder with no husband present, and 43.0% were non-families. 39.0% of all households were made up of individuals, and 26.3% had someone living alone who was 65 years of age or older. The average household size was 2.09 and the average family size was 2.74.

In the city the population was spread out, with 21.2% under the age of 18, 6.2% from 18 to 24, 22.5% from 25 to 44, 22.3% from 45 to 64, and 27.9% who were 65 years of age or older. The median age was 45 years. For every 100 females, there were 82.8 males. For every 100 females age 18 and over, there were 80.4 males.

The median income for a household in the city was $27,969, and the median income for a family was $34,107. Males had a median income of $27,639 versus $18,182 for females. The per capita income for the city was $18,516. About 11.3% of families and 17.7% of the population were below the poverty line, including 15.9% of those under age 18 and 19.8% of those age 65 or over.
