= Triplett, Missouri =

- City
- Location of Triplett, Missouri
- Coordinates: 39°29′55″N 93°11′37″W
- Country: United States
- State: Missouri
- County: Chariton
- Incorporated: 1881

Area
  - Total: 0.23 sq mi (0.60 km^{2})
  - Land: 0.23 sq mi (0.60 km^{2})
  - Water: 0 sq mi (0.00 km^{2})
- Elevation: 659 ft (201 m)

Population (2020)
  - Total: 33
  - Density: 143.0/sq mi (55.23/km^{2})
- Time zone: UTC-6 (Central (CST))
  - Summer (DST): UTC-5 (CDT)
- ZIP code: 65286
- Area code: 660
- FIPS code: 29-73870
- GNIS feature ID: 2397055

Triplett is a city in Chariton County, Missouri, United States. The population was 33 at the 2020 census.

== History ==
Triplett was founded in 1870 when the railroad was extended to that point. The community was named after J. E. M. Triplett, a first settler. A post office called Triplett was established in 1875, and remained in operation until 2001.

== Geography ==
According to the United States Census Bureau, the city has a total area of 0.23 square miles (0.60 km^{2}), all land.

== Demographics ==
Historical population
Census	Pop.	Note	%±
1880	203		—
1890	813		300.5%
1900	342		−57.9%
1910	473		38.3%
1920	337		−28.8%
1930	350		3.9%
1940	340		−2.9%
1950	301		−11.5%
1960	231		−23.3%
1970	191		−17.3%
1980	137		−28.3%
1990	58		−57.7%
2000	64		10.3%
2010	41		−35.9%
2020	33		−19.5%
U.S. Decennial Census

=== 2010 census ===
As of the census of 2010, there were 41 people, 21 households, and 10 families living in the city. The population density was 178.3 inhabitants per square mile (68.8 inhabitants/km^{2}). There were 32 housing units at an average density of 139.1 units per square mile (53.7 units/km^{2}). The racial makeup of the city was 92.7% White and 7.3% African American.

There were 21 households, of which 4.8% had children under the age of 18 living with them, 42.9% were married couples living together, 4.8% had a male householder with no wife present, and 52.4% were non-families. 33.3% of all households were made up of individuals, and 23.8% had someone living alone who was 65 years of age or older. The average household size was 1.95 and the average family size was 2.50.

The median age in the city was 53.5 years. 4.9% of residents were under the age of 18; 7.2% were between the ages of 18 and 24; 14.6% were from 25 to 44; 43.9% were from 45 to 64; and 29.3% were 65 years of age or older. The gender makeup of the city was 51.2% male and 48.8% female.

=== 2000 census ===
As of the census of 2000, there were 64 people, 27 households, and 18 families living in the city. The population density was 279.9 inhabitants per square mile (108.1 inhabitants/km^{2}). There were 35 housing units at an average density of 153.1 units per square mile (59.1 units/km^{2}). The racial makeup of the city was 87.50% White, 7.81% African American, 1.56% Native American, 1.56% Asian, and 1.56% from two or more races.

There were 27 households, out of which 29.6% had children under the age of 18 living with them, 55.6% were married couples living together, 7.4% had a female householder with no husband present, and 33.3% were non-families. 33.3% of all households were made up of individuals, and 18.5% had someone living alone who was 65 years of age or older. The average household size was 2.37 and the average family size was 3.00.

In the city the population was spread out, with 21.9% under the age of 18, 7.8% from 18 to 24, 29.7% from 25 to 44, 28.1% from 45 to 64, and 12.5% who were 65 years of age or older. The median age was 42 years. For every 100 females, there were 100.0 males. For every 100 females age 18 and over, there were 100.0 males.

The median income for a household in the city was $18,750, and the median income for a family was $33,750. Males had a median income of $26,875 versus $12,500 for females. The per capita income for the city was $12,773. There were 30.8% of families and 47.7% of the population living below the poverty line, including 75.0% of under eighteens and 77.8% of those over 64.
