= Chariton County, Missouri =

County in Missouri, United States

- County
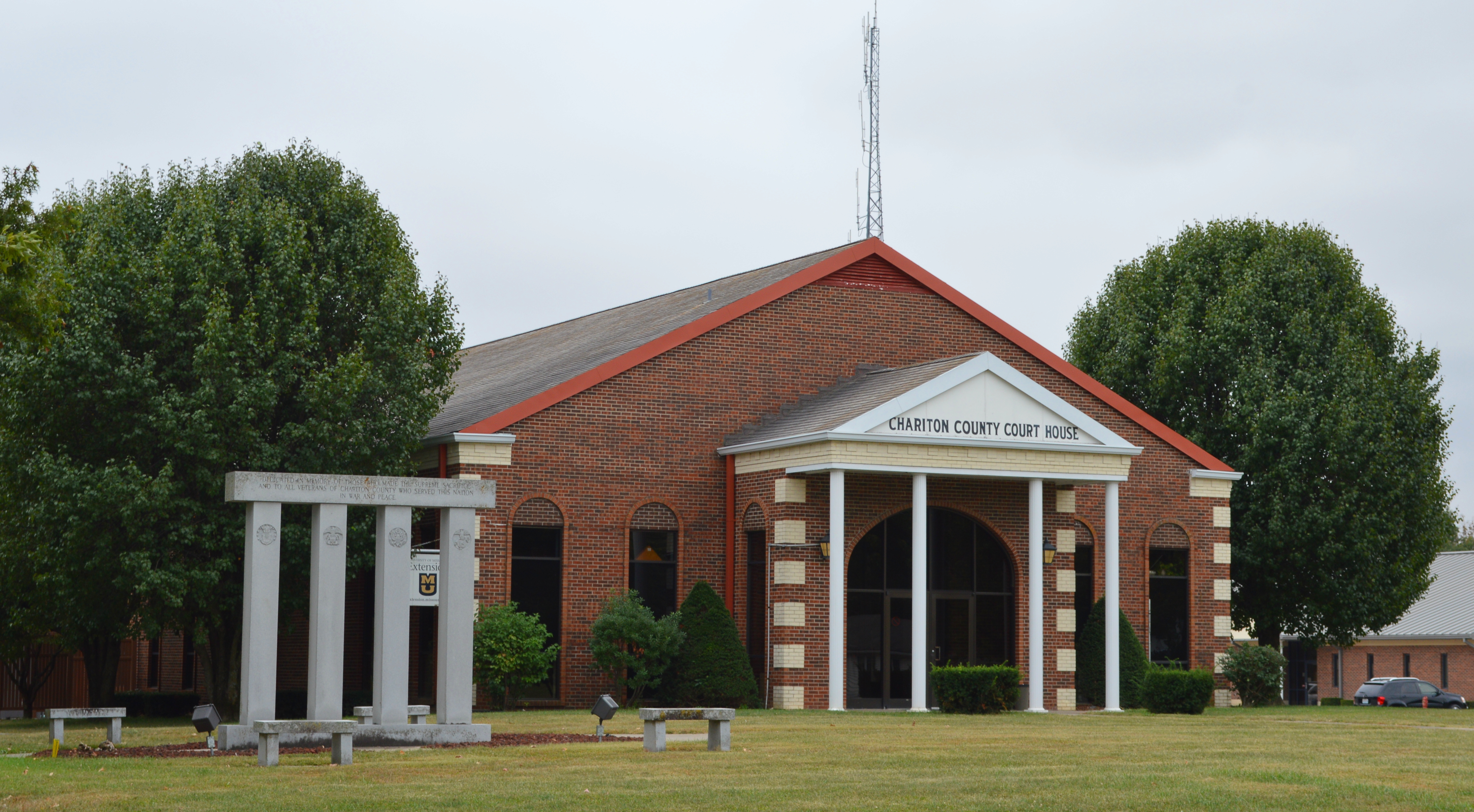
- The Chariton County Courthouse in Keytesville

- Location within the U.S. state of Missouri
- Coordinates: 39°31′N 92°58′W
- Country: United States
- State: Missouri
- Founded: November 16, 1820
- Named for: The Chariton River
- Seat: Keytesville
- Largest city: Salisbury

Area
  - Total: 767 sq mi (1,990 km^{2})
  - Land: 751 sq mi (1,950 km^{2})
  - Water: 16 sq mi (41 km^{2}) 2.0%

Population (2020)
  - Total: 7,408
  - Estimate (2025): 7,377 ▼
  - Density: 9.86/sq mi (3.81/km^{2})
- Time zone: UTC−6 (Central)
  - Summer (DST): UTC−5 (CDT)
- Congressional district: 6th
- Website: https://www.charitonco.com/

Chariton County (/ˈʃɛərɪtən/ SHAIR-it-ən) is a county located in the north-central portion of the U.S. state of Missouri. As of the 2020 census, the population was 7,408. Its county seat is Keytesville. The county was organized November 16, 1820, from part of Howard County and is named for the Chariton River.

== History ==
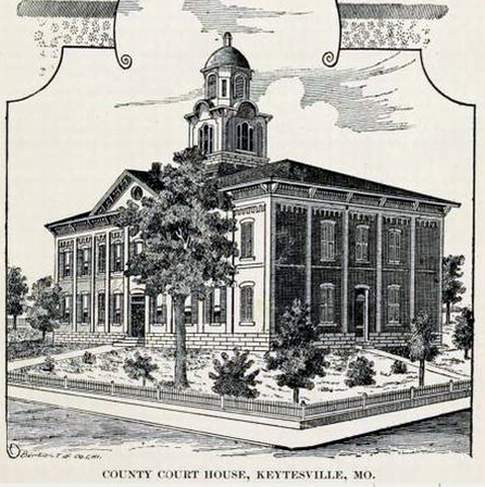
The second Chariton County Courthouse 1867–1973. It replaced one destroyed by Confederate raiders in September 1864.

Chariton County was settled primarily from the states of the Upper South, especially Kentucky and Tennessee. They brought slaves and slaveholding traditions with them, and they quickly started cultivating crops similar to those in Middle Tennessee and Kentucky: hemp and tobacco. Chariton was one of several counties settled mostly by southerners to the north and south of the Missouri River. Given their culture and traditions, this area became known as Little Dixie and Chariton County was at its heart. It was heavily pro-Confederate during the American Civil War.

== Geography ==
According to the U.S. Census Bureau, the county has a total area of 767 square miles (1,990 km^{2}), of which 751 square miles (1,950 km^{2}) is land and 16 square miles (41 km^{2}) (2.0%) is water.

=== Adjacent counties ===
- Linn County (north)
- Macon County (northeast)
- Randolph County (east)
- Howard County (southeast)
- Saline County (southwest)
- Carroll County (west)
- Livingston County (northwest)

=== Major highways ===
- U.S. Route 24
- Route 5
- Route 11
- Route 129
- Route 139

=== National protected area ===
- Swan Lake National Wildlife Refuge

== Demographics ==
Historical population
Census	Pop.	Note	%±
1830	1,780		—
1840	4,746		166.6%
1850	7,514		58.3%
1860	12,562		67.2%
1870	19,136		52.3%
1880	25,224		31.8%
1890	26,254		4.1%
1900	26,826		2.2%
1910	23,503		−12.4%
1920	21,769		−7.4%
1930	19,588		−10.0%
1940	18,084		−7.7%
1950	14,944		−17.4%
1960	12,720		−14.9%
1970	11,084		−12.9%
1980	10,489		−5.4%
1990	9,202		−12.3%
2000	8,438		−8.3%
2010	7,831		−7.2%
2020	7,408		−5.4%
2025 (est.)	7,377	▼	−0.4%
U.S. Decennial Census; 1790-1960 1900-1990; 1990-2000 2010-2015

=== 2020 census ===
As of the 2020 census, the county had a population of 7,408 and a median age of 46.0 years; 22.4% of residents were under the age of 18 and 24.2% were 65 years of age or older. For every 100 females there were 102.3 males, and for every 100 females age 18 and over there were 97.9 males age 18 and over.

The 2020 Redistricting Data (Public Law 94-171) show that 94.1% of residents identified as White, 2.0% as Black or African American, 0.3% as American Indian and Alaska Native, 0.1% as Asian, 0.0% as Native Hawaiian and Pacific Islander, 0.1% as some other race, and 3.4% as two or more races; 1.4% of the population were Hispanic or Latino of any race.

No residents lived in urban areas while 100.0% lived in rural areas.

There were 3,067 households in the county, of which 26.7% had children under the age of 18 living with them and 22.4% had a female householder with no spouse or partner present; 29.9% of all households were made up of individuals and 16.0% had someone living alone who was 65 years of age or older.

There were 3,792 housing units, of which 19.1% were vacant. Among occupied housing units, 80.0% were owner-occupied and 20.0% were renter-occupied, the homeowner vacancy rate was 0.8%, and the rental vacancy rate was 13.0%.

=== Racial and ethnic composition ===
Chariton County, Missouri – Racial and ethnic composition Note: the US Census treats Hispanic/Latino as an ethnic category. This table excludes Latinos from the racial categories and assigns them to a separate category. Hispanics/Latinos may be of any race.
Race / Ethnicity (NH = Non-Hispanic)	Pop 1980	Pop 1990	Pop 2000	Pop 2010	Pop 2020	% 1980	% 1990	% 2000	% 2010	% 2020
White alone (NH)	9,923	8,820	8,067	7,544	6,925	94.60%	95.85%	95.60%	96.34%	93.48%
Black or African American alone (NH)	513	337	264	155	144	4.89%	3.66%	3.13%	1.98%	1.94%
Native American or Alaska Native alone (NH)	12	15	13	18	15	0.11%	0.16%	0.15%	0.23%	0.20%
Asian alone (NH)	7	7	11	7	3	0.07%	0.08%	0.13%	0.09%	0.04%
Native Hawaiian or Pacific Islander alone (NH)	x	x	0	0	3	x	x	0.00%	0.00%	0.04%
Other race alone (NH)	4	4	1	3	1	0.04%	0.04%	0.01%	0.04%	0.01%
Mixed race or Multiracial (NH)	x	x	35	64	216	x	x	0.41%	0.82%	2.92%
Hispanic or Latino (any race)	30	19	47	40	101	0.29%	0.21%	0.56%	0.51%	1.36%
Total	10,489	9,202	8,438	7,831	7,408	100.00%	100.00%	100.00%	100.00%	100.00%

=== 2000 census ===
As of the census of 2000, there were 8,438 people, 3,469 households, and 2,345 families residing in the county. The population density was 11 people per square mile (4.2 people/km^{2}). There were 4,250 housing units at an average density of 6 units per square mile (2.3/km^{2}). The racial makeup of the county was 95.99% White, 3.19% Black or African American, 0.17% Native American, 0.13% Asian, 0.11% from other races, and 0.41% from two or more races. Approximately 0.56% of the population were Hispanic or Latino of any race. 38.8% were of German, 25.5% American, 9.7% English and 7.8% Irish ancestry.

There were 3,469 households, out of which 28.40% had children under the age of 18 living with them, 58.30% were married couples living together, 6.50% had a female householder with no husband present, and 32.40% were non-families. 29.80% of all households were made up of individuals, and 17.30% had someone living alone who was 65 years of age or older. The average household size was 2.38 and the average family size was 2.94.

In the county, the population was spread out, with 23.70% under the age of 18, 6.50% from 18 to 24, 23.70% from 25 to 44, 23.80% from 45 to 64, and 22.30% who were 65 years of age or older. The median age was 42 years. For every 100 females there were 91.90 males. For every 100 females age 18 and over, there were 91.30 males.

The median income for a household in the county was $32,285, and the median income for a family was $39,176. Males had a median income of $25,263 versus $19,068 for females. The per capita income for the county was $15,515. About 8.80% of families and 11.60% of the population were below the poverty line, including 11.40% of those under age 18 and 14.00% of those age 65 or over.

== Education ==
=== Public schools ===
School districts include:

- Brookfield R-III School District
- Brunswick R-II School District – Brunswick
  - Brunswick Elementary School (PK-06)
  - Brunswick High School (07-12)
- Glasgow School District
- Keytesville R-III School District – Keytesville
  - Keytesville Elementary School (PK-06)
  - Keytesville High School (07-12)
- Marceline R-V School District
- Northwestern R-I School District – Mendon
  - Northwestern Elementary School (PK-06)
  - Northwestern High School (07-12)
- Salisbury R-IV School District – Salisbury
  - Salisbury Elementary School (K-06)
  - Salisbury High School (07-12)

=== Private schools ===
- St. Joseph School – Salisbury (K-09) – Roman Catholic

=== Public libraries ===
- Brunswick Area Library
- Dulany Memorial Library
- Keytesville Public Library

== Communities ==
=== Cities and Towns ===
- Brunswick
- Dalton
- Keytesville (county seat)
- Marceline
- Mendon
- Rothville
- Salisbury
- Sumner
- Triplett

=== Census-designated place ===
- Prairie Hill

=== Unincorporated communities ===
- Bynumville
- Cunningham
- Forest Green
- Guthridge
- Hamden
- Indian Grove
- Lagonda
- Lewis Mill
- Louisville
- Mike
- Musselfork
- Newcomer
- Rockford
- Shannondale
- Snyder
- Westville
- Wien

=== Former Settlement ===
- Fort Orleans

=== Townships ===
- Bee Branch
- Bowling Green
- Brunswick
- Chariton
- Clark
- Cockrell
- Cunningham
- Keytesville
- Mendon
- Musselfork
- Salisbury
- Salt Creek
- Triplett
- Wayland
- Yellow Creek

== Notable people ==
- Jane Hadley Barkley—former 2nd Lady of the U.S., wife of Alben Barkley. (Keytesville)
- John Donaldson – Negro league baseball pitcher. Known for pitching a large number of no-hitters. (Glasgow)
- J. William Fulbright—Longtime U.S. Senator and namesake of the Fulbright Scholarship. (Sumner)
- Cal Hubbard, – Pro Football Hall of Fame member and former Major League Baseball umpire. (Keytesville)
- Vern Kennedy—Former Major League Baseball pitcher. (Mendon)
- Darold Knowles—Former MLB relief pitcher. First pitcher to ever appear in all seven games of a World Series. The baseball field at Brunswick R-II school is named in his honor. (Brunswick)
- Wayne E. Meyer—U.S. Navy admiral, "Father of the Aegis weapons system". (Brunswick)
- W. James Morgan—Union Army officer, responsible for the Burning of Platte City during the American Civil War. (Brunswick)
- Floyd B. Parks – U.S. Marine aviator who earned the Navy Cross posthumously for his actions leading Marine fighter squadron VMF-221 during the Battle of Midway. (Salisbury)
- Sterling Price, - 11th Governor of Missouri. Confederate General in the Civil War (Keytesville)
- Sol Smith Russell—Comic stage actor of the late 19th century. Russell Opera House in Brunswick is named for him. (Brunswick)
- Wilbur Sweatman – Ragtime and Dixieland jazz composer and performer. (Brunswick)
- Maxwell D. Taylor - U.S. Army general and diplomat. (Keytesville)

== Politics ==
=== Local ===
Chariton County, Missouri

Elected countywide officials
Assessor	Darrin E. Gladbach	Democratic
Circuit Clerk	Eric Stallo	Democratic
County Clerk	Mitzi Schuchmann	Republican
Collector	Darlene Shipp	Democratic
Commissioner (presiding)	Evan Emmerich	Republican
Commissioner (district 1)	Jared Meyer	Republican
Commissioner (district 2)	Terry Milford	Republican
Coroner	Nyle Bowyer	Republican
Prosecuting Attorney	Cliff Thornburg	Democratic
Public Administrator	Brenda Bennett	Republican
Recorder	Eric Stallo	Democratic
Sheriff	Erick Billups	Republican
Treasurer	Darlene Shipp	Democratic

=== State ===
Past Gubernatorial Elections Results
Year	Republican	Democratic	Third Parties
2024	77.58% 3,131	20.61% 832	1.83% 73
2020	76.13% 3,100	22.35% 910	1.52% 62
2016	59.61% 2,364	38.40% 1,523	1.99% 79
2012	46.59% 1,770	50.99% 1,937	2.42% 92
2008	46.54% 1,951	51.67% 2,166	1.79% 75
2004	54.32% 2,350	44.87% 1,941	0.81% 35
2000	48.47% 1,998	50.39% 2,077	1.14% 47
1996	33.31% 1,326	65.16% 2,594	1.53% 61

Chariton County is split between two districts in the Missouri House of Representatives, with both electing Republicans.

- District 39 – Joe Don McGaugh (R-Carrollton). Consists of the northern part of the county.

Missouri House of Representatives — District 39 — Chariton County (2016)
Party	Candidate	Votes	%	±%
Republican	Joe Don McGaugh	2,507	100.00%	

Missouri House of Representatives — District 39 — Chariton County (2014)
Party	Candidate	Votes	%	±%
Republican	Joe Don McGaugh	1,420	100.00%	+45.73

Missouri House of Representatives — District 39 — Chariton County (2012)
Party	Candidate	Votes	%	±%
Republican	Joe Don McHaugh	1,562	54.27%	
Democratic	Will Talbert	1,316	45.73%	

- District 48 – Dave Muntzel (R-Boonville). Consists of the southern part of the county.

Missouri House of Representatives — District 48 — Chariton County (2016)
Party	Candidate	Votes	%	±%
Republican	Dave Muntzel	676	81.06%	−18.94
Independent	Debra Dilks	158	18.94%	

Missouri House of Representatives — District 48 — Chariton County (2014)
Party	Candidate	Votes	%	±%
Republican	Dave Muntzel	401	100.00%	+51.07

Missouri House of Representatives — District 48 — Chariton County (2012)
Party	Candidate	Votes	%	±%
Republican	Dave Muntzel	413	48.93%	
Democratic	Ron Monnig	431	51.07%	

All of Chariton County is a part of Missouri's 18th District in the Missouri Senate and is currently represented by Cindy O'Laughlin (R-Shelbina).

Missouri Senate — District 18 — Chariton County (2014)
Party	Candidate	Votes	%	±%
Republican	Brian Munzlinger	1,781	100.00%	

=== Federal ===
U.S. Senate — Missouri — Chariton County (2016)
Party	Candidate	Votes	%	±%
Republican	Roy Blunt	2,322	58.64%	+13.93
Democratic	Jason Kander	1,465	36.99%	−12.11
Libertarian	Jonathan Dine	94	2.37%	−3.82
Green	Johnathan McFarland	35	0.88%	+0.88
Constitution	Fred Ryman	44	1.11%	+1.11

U.S. Senate — Missouri — Chariton County (2012)
Party	Candidate	Votes	%	±%
Republican	Todd Akin	1,690	44.71%	
Democratic	Claire McCaskill	1,856	49.10%	
Libertarian	Jonathan Dine	234	6.19%	

All of Chariton County is included in Missouri's 6th Congressional District and is currently represented by Sam Graves (R-Tarkio) in the U.S. House of Representatives.

U.S. House of Representatives – Missouri’s 6th Congressional District – Chariton County (2016)
Party	Candidate	Votes	%	±%
Republican	Sam Graves	2,889	74.17%	+3.56
Democratic	David M. Blackwell	894	22.95	−2.32
Libertarian	Russ Lee Monchil	72	1.85%	−2.27
Green	Mike Diel	40	1.03%	+1.03

U.S. House of Representatives — Missouri's 6th Congressional District — Chariton County (2014)
Party	Candidate	Votes	%	±%
Republican	Sam Graves	1,643	70.61%	+2.53
Democratic	Bill Hedge	588	25.27%	−4.78
Libertarian	Russ Lee Monchil	96	4.12%	+2.25

U.S. House of Representatives — Missouri's 6th Congressional District — Chariton County (2012)
Party	Candidate	Votes	%	±%
Republican	Sam Graves	2,546	68.08%	
Democratic	Kyle Yarber	1,124	30.05%	
Libertarian	Russ Lee Monchil	70	1.87%	

United States presidential election results for Chariton County, Missouri
Year	Republican		Democratic		Third party(ies)	
Year	No.	%	No.	%	No.	%
1888	2,345	39.71%	3,452	58.45%	109	1.85%
1892	2,057	35.98%	3,463	60.57%	197	3.45%
1896	2,359	35.21%	4,321	64.49%	20	0.30%
1900	2,138	35.27%	3,828	63.16%	95	1.57%
1904	2,064	39.39%	3,058	58.36%	118	2.25%
1908	2,249	39.78%	3,352	59.30%	52	0.92%
1912	1,528	27.94%	3,112	56.90%	829	15.16%
1916	2,183	40.60%	3,135	58.30%	59	1.10%
1920	4,331	47.68%	4,675	51.46%	78	0.86%
1924	3,173	38.72%	4,795	58.52%	226	2.76%
1928	3,929	46.22%	4,559	53.63%	13	0.15%
1932	1,835	24.91%	5,498	74.63%	34	0.46%
1936	3,433	38.33%	5,490	61.29%	34	0.38%
1940	4,439	46.74%	5,053	53.21%	5	0.05%
1944	3,802	49.12%	3,930	50.78%	8	0.10%
1948	2,615	38.51%	4,170	61.40%	6	0.09%
1952	3,883	50.91%	3,730	48.91%	14	0.18%
1956	3,459	48.51%	3,671	51.49%	0	0.00%
1960	3,102	46.63%	3,550	53.37%	0	0.00%
1964	1,932	33.34%	3,862	66.66%	0	0.00%
1968	2,404	45.50%	2,371	44.87%	509	9.63%
1972	2,812	58.45%	1,999	41.55%	0	0.00%
1976	2,128	40.89%	3,055	58.70%	21	0.40%
1980	2,641	53.11%	2,250	45.24%	82	1.65%
1984	2,744	55.01%	2,244	44.99%	0	0.00%
1988	2,193	48.14%	2,347	51.53%	15	0.33%
1992	1,378	29.95%	2,141	46.53%	1,082	23.52%
1996	1,508	37.40%	2,072	51.39%	452	11.21%
2000	2,300	55.37%	1,792	43.14%	62	1.49%
2004	2,421	55.78%	1,892	43.59%	27	0.62%
2008	2,339	55.51%	1,799	42.69%	76	1.80%
2012	2,402	62.86%	1,339	35.04%	80	2.09%
2016	2,950	74.33%	888	22.37%	131	3.30%
2020	3,111	76.31%	916	22.47%	50	1.23%
2024	3,179	77.75%	875	21.40%	35	0.86%

=== Missouri presidential preference primary (2008) ===
Former U.S. Senator Hillary Clinton (D-New York) received more votes, a total of 786, than any candidate from either party in Chariton County during the 2008 presidential primary. She also received more votes than the total number of votes cast in the entire Republican primary in Chariton County.

== See also ==
- Mormon War (1838)
- National Register of Historic Places listings in Chariton County, Missouri
