= Indian Creek =

Indian Creek may refer to the following:

== Communities ==
=== Belize ===
- Indian Creek Colony, in Orange Walk District
- Indian Creek, Toledo, in Toledo District

=== United States ===
- Indian Creek, Florida
- Indian Creek, Illinois
- Indian Creek No. 7 Precinct, Menard County, Illinois
- Indian Creek, Missouri
- Indian Creek, Texas
- Indian Creek, Wisconsin
- Indian Creek Township (disambiguation)

== Streams ==
=== Multiple states ===
- Indian Creek (Blue River tributary), in Kansas and Missouri
- Indian Creek (Powell River tributary), in Tennessee and Virginia
- Indian Creek (Thompson River tributary), in Iowa and Missouri

=== Arizona ===
- Indian Creek (Hassayampa River tributary), near Ponderosa Park

=== California ===
- Indian Creek (North Fork Feather River tributary), a tributary of the North Fork Feather River
- Indian Creek (Plumas County, California)
- Indian Creek (San Jacinto River tributary), a tributary of the San Jacinto River in Riverside County
- Indian Creek (San Leandro River tributary), a tributary of San Leandro Creek, in Contra Costa County

=== Florida ===
- Indian Creek (Miami Beach)

=== Idaho ===
- Indian Creek (Boise River tributary)

=== Illinois ===
- Indian Creek (Fox River tributary)

=== Indiana ===
- Indian Creek (Fall Creek tributary), in Marion County
- Indian Creek (Tippecanoe River tributary)

=== Iowa ===
- Indian Creek (Cedar River tributary)
- Indian Creek (Des Moines River tributary)
- Indian Creek (Iowa River tributary)

=== Kansas ===
- Indian Creek (Little Osage River tributary)
- Indian Creek (Neosho River tributary)

=== Kentucky ===
- Indian Creek (Barren River tributary), a tributary of the Big Barren River, in Monroe County

=== Maryland ===
- Indian Creek (Severn River), a tributary of the Severn River, in Anne Arundel County

=== Missouri ===
- Indian Creek (Big Piney River tributary)
- Indian Creek (Black River tributary)
- Indian Creek (Cole Camp Creek tributary)
- Indian Creek (Courtois Creek tributary)
- Indian Creek (Crooked Creek tributary)
- Indian Creek (Elk River tributary)
- Indian Creek (Establishment Creek tributary)
- Indian Creek (Huzzah Creek tributary)
- Indian Creek (Meramec River tributary)
- Indian Creek (Mississippi River tributary)
- Indian Creek (Monroe County, Missouri)
- Indian Creek (Morgan County, Missouri)
- Indian Creek (Niangua River tributary)
- Indian Creek (North Fork River tributary), in Howell and Douglas counties
- Indian Creek (North Fork Cuivre River tributary)
- Indian Creek (St. Francis River tributary)
- Indian Creek (Stone County, Missouri)

=== New York ===
- Indian Creek (New York), a tributary of Cayuga Lake
- Indian Creek (Black River, New York)
- Indian Creek (Sand Hill Creek tributary)

=== North Carolina ===
- Indian Creek (Deep River tributary), in Chatham County

=== Ohio ===
- Indian Creek (Brandywine Creek tributary)

=== Pennsylvania ===
- Indian Creek (Youghiogheny River tributary)
- Indian Creek (Mauses Creek tributary)
- Indian Creek (Cobbs Creek tributary)

=== Tennessee ===
- Indian Creek (Tennessee River tributary), in Wayne and Hardin Counties
- Indian Creek (Putnam County, Tennessee), a tributary of the Caney Fork River

=== Utah ===
- Indian Creek (Beaver River tributary)

=== Virginia ===
- Indian Creek (Clinch River tributary)

=== Washington ===
- Indian Creek (Elwha River tributary)
- Indian Creek (Hawk Creek tributary)
- Indian Creek (Olympia, Washington), a tributary of the Moxlie Creek

=== West Virginia ===
- Indian Creek (Guyandotte River tributary)
- Indian Creek (Hughes River tributary)
- Indian Creek (Middle Island Creek tributary)
- Indian Creek (New River tributary)

== Bridges ==
- Indian Creek Bridge, east of Cedar Rapids, Iowa
- Indian Creek Covered Bridge, Monroe County, West Virginia

== Schools ==
- Indian Creek Community Unit School District 425, DeKalb County, Illinois
- Indian Creek High School (disambiguation)
- Indian Creek Local School District, Wintersville, Ohio
- Indian Creek School, Crownsville, Maryland

== Transport ==
- Indian Creek Railroad, a short-line railroad in Madison County, Indiana
- Indian Creek station, a passenger rail station in Stone Mountain, Georgia
- Indian Creek USFS Airport, Valley County, Idaho

== Other ==
- Indian Creek (climbing area), in Canyonlands, Utah
- Indian Creek Correctional Center, Chesapeake, Virginia
- Indian Creek massacre, near present-day Ottawa, Illinois, in 1832
- Indian Creek Recreation Area, in Alexander State Forest, Rapides Parish, Louisiana
- Indian Creek Wilderness Study Area, southern Utah

== See also ==
- Big Indian Creek (disambiguation)
- Dead Indian Creek (disambiguation)
- Indian Brook (disambiguation)
- Indian River (disambiguation)
- Indian Run (disambiguation)
- Indian Stream (disambiguation)
- Injun Creek, now Engine Creek, a stream in Tennessee
