= Indian Run =

Indian Run may refer to the following in the United States:

== Streams and tributaries ==
- Indian Run (Delaware County, Ohio)
- Indian Run (Muskingum River tributary), Ohio
- Indian Run (Little Schuylkill River tributary), Pennsylvania
- Indian Run (Neshannock Creek tributary), Pennsylvania
- Indian Run (Hughes River), West Virginia

== Places ==
- Indian Run, Mercer County, Pennsylvania

== See also ==
- Indian Creek (disambiguation)
- Indian Brook (disambiguation)
- Indian River (disambiguation)
- Indian Stream (disambiguation)
