= St. Stephen, Martyr Roman Catholic Church =

Church in Chesapeake, Virginia, US

Coordinates: 36.6683°N 76.2285°W

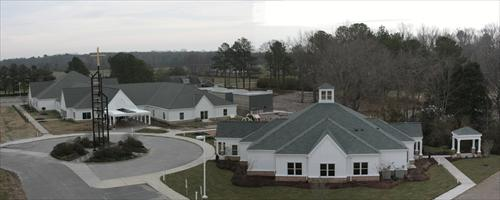
St. Stephen Martyr Church and Office

St. Stephen, Martyr is a Roman Catholic Church and part of the Diocese of Richmond, located in Chesapeake, Virginia. It was established in 1997 to accommodate the growing Catholic community of the Chesapeake area.

== Parish history ==
St. Stephen, Martyr's parish was founded in the spring of 1997 under the then-Bishop of Richmond, Most. Rev. Walter Francis Sullivan who served as Bishop of Richmond from July 1974 - September 2003. The founding priest, Fr. James Gordon, presided over the community's first liturgy held in the gymnasium of nearby Southeastern Elementary School on June 29, 1997. Approximately 150 families comprised the initial parish, which has since grown to include over 1500 families living in the Great Bridge, Hickory, and Currituck areas.

From June 1997 to June 2002, the St. Stephen, Martyr parish did not have an official place of worship, so the Masses were held in Southeastern Elementary School and Twiford Funeral Home until enough money could be raised to build a church. Construction of the parish's worship space, now known as Gordon Hall, began in February 2002 and was completed and dedicated on June 18, 2002 by Bishop Sullivan.

== Ministries and outreach programs ==
At its inception, St. Stephen, Martyr did not have any ministries or social welfare programs. As pastor and one of three original parish staff members, Fr. Gordon helped get the community on its feet by establishing Christian Formation, a ministry of teaching young people about the Bible and Catholicism, for parish children in elementary through high school age groups. Under Fr. Gordon's successor, Monsignor Michael McCarron, the church staff grew from three to ten full-time employees and the number of ministries and outreach programs now number over ten.

The parish community participates in several ministries, such as prison outreach, to the inmates of Indian Creek Correctional Center and St. Brides Correctional Center; fundraising and coordination for the local chapter of Habitat for Humanity, and also delivering meals to the needy through the Meals on Wheels program.
