= C. ponderosa =

C. ponderosa may refer to:

- Casmaria ponderosa, a sea snail species
- Cincinnatia ponderosa, renamed Floridobia ponderosa, the ponderous siltsnail or ponderous spring snail, endemic to a single spring in Florida

== See also ==
- Ponderosa (disambiguation)
