= Indian River =

Indian River may refer to:

== Rivers ==
=== In Barbados ===
- Indian River (Barbados)

=== In Canada ===
- Indian River (British Columbia), which enters Indian Arm to the north of North Vancouver
- Indian River, a tidal flow east of Deer Island, New Brunswick
- In Ontario:
  - Indian River (Algoma District), a right tributary of the Montreal River
  - Indian River (Rice Lake), in Peterborough County, which flows from Stoney Lake to Rice Lake
  - Indian River (Lanark County), a tributary of the Mississippi River
  - Indian River (Muskoka District), which flows from Lake Rosseau to Lake Muskoka
  - Indian River (Muskrat River watershed), in Renfrew County and Nipissing District, a left tributary of the Muskrat River
- In the Yukon:
  - Indian River (Yukon), a tributary of the Yukon River
  - Dän Tàgé, formerly known as the Indian River

=== In Dominica ===
- Indian River (Dominica), a river in Portsmouth

=== In the United States ===
- Indian River (Alaska)
- Indian River (Connecticut)
- Indian River (Delaware)
- Indian River (Florida)
- Indian River (Maine)
  - Southwest Branch Indian River
- In Michigan:
  - Indian River (Manistique River tributary), in the Upper Peninsula
  - Indian River (Mullett Lake), in the Lower Peninsula
- Indian River (New Hampshire)
- In New York:
  - Indian River (Black Lake), a tributary of the Oswegatchie River in far northern New York
  - Indian River (Hudson River tributary), in the Adirondack Mountains
  - Indian River (Moose River tributary), in the Adirondack Mountains, part of the Black River watershed
  - Indian River (West Canada Creek tributary), in the Adirondack Mountains, part of the Mohawk River watershed
- Indian River (South Dakota), a tributary of the Big Sioux River
- Indian River (Virginia)

== Communities ==
=== In Canada ===
- Indian River, Ontario, a community in Otonabee-South Monaghan
- Indian River (reserve), a First Nations reserve in Ontario
- Indian River, Prince Edward Island

=== In the United States ===
- Indian River Hundred, an unincorporated subdivision of Sussex County, Delaware
- Indian River County, Florida
- Indian River Estates, Florida
- Indian River Shores, Florida
- Indian River, Michigan

== Other uses ==
- "Indian River" (poem), a 1917 poem by Wallace Stevens
- PS Indian River, a sidewheel steamer built in 1861, formerly USS Clyde

== See also ==
- List of rivers of India
- Indian River High School (disambiguation)
- Indian River School District (disambiguation)
- Indian Brook (disambiguation)
- Indian Creek (disambiguation)
- Indian Run (disambiguation)
- Indian Stream (disambiguation)
