= Stoutsville =

Stoutsville can refer to:

- Stoutsville, Missouri
- Stoutsville, Ohio
