= Alexander State Forest Headquarters Building =

- U.S. National Register of Historic Places
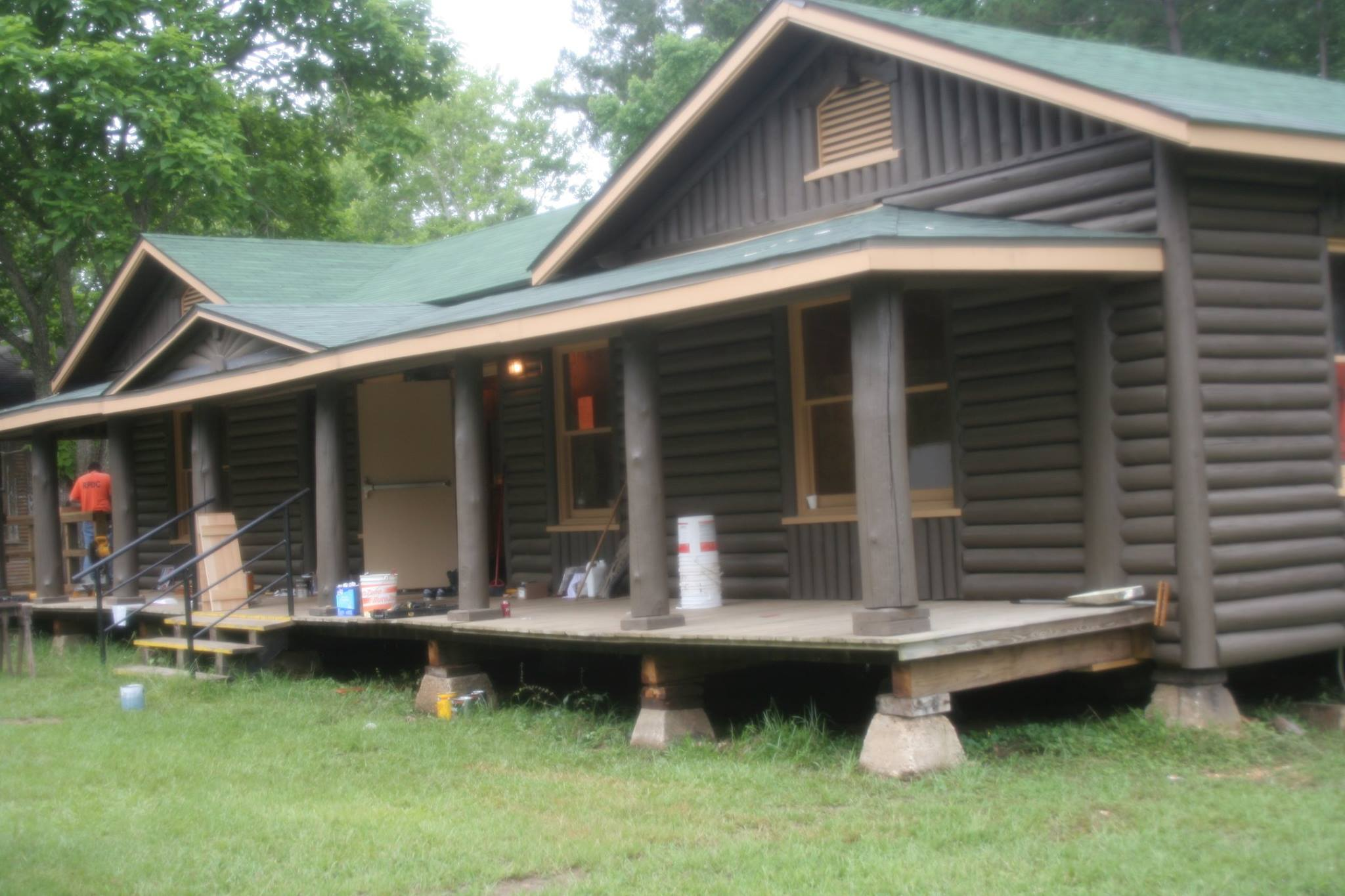

- Location within Louisiana Location within the United States
- Location: Alexander State Forest, Woodworth, Louisiana
- Coordinates: 31°8′28″N 92°28′29″W
- Area: 7 acres (2.8 ha)
- Built: 1935
- Architect: Civilian Conservation Corps
- NRHP reference No.: 87000771
- Added to NRHP: May 21, 1987

The Alexander State Forest Headquarters Building served as the headquarters of the Alexander State Forest in Woodworth, Louisiana. The building, a log cabin, was constructed in 1935 by the Civilian Conservation Corps, who had established a camp in the forest in 1923. Alexander State Forest, which was established in 1923 and continued to grow until 1938, was the first state forest in Louisiana and marked the first effort by a Southern state to preserve its yellow pine forests. The headquarters building is the only remaining structure from the forest's early years and is the main physical remnant of Louisiana's conservation efforts in the early 20th century. This log building was moved to the Southern Forest Heritage Museum at Longleaf, Louisiana in September 2014 to host a Civilian Conservation Corps museum.

The building was added to the National Register of Historic Places on May 21, 1987.
