= Indian Creek, Missouri =

Unincorporated community in Missouri, U.S.

Coordinates: 39°35′40″N 91°46′37″W

Indian Creek is an unincorporated community in northeastern Monroe County, in the U.S. state of Missouri.

The community is located on the banks of Indian Creek and along U.S. Route 24 about midway between Monroe City to the northeast and Stoutsville to the southwest.

Another name for the community of Indian Creek is "Swinkey". This name comes from one of the original settlers and the name has stuck to this day.

Indian Creek is home to St Stephen's Catholic Church (which is the oldest in the Diocese of Jefferson City). Every year in July, the church holds "Swinky Days For Kids" which is a faith-filled youth conference

== History ==
A post office called Indian Creek was established in 1839, and remained in operation until 1906. The community took its name from nearby Indian Creek.
