= Bearwallow Run (Ritchie County, West Virginia) =

River in West Virginia, United States

Coordinates: 39°11′01″N 81°00′14″W

Bearwallow Run is a stream located entirely within Ritchie County, West Virginia. It is a tributary of Indian Creek.

Bearwallow Run was descriptively named by the Native Americans.

== See also ==
- List of rivers of West Virginia
