= Indian Creek Township, Monroe County, Missouri =

Township in the U.S. state of Missouri

Coordinates: 39.5778°N 91.8008°W

Indian Creek Township is an inactive township in Monroe County, in the U.S. state of Missouri.

Indian Creek Township was established in 1840, taking its name from Indian Creek.
