= IRHS =

IRHS is a four-letter acronym that may stand for:

- Indian Railway Health Service
- Iroquois Ridge High School, Oakville, Ontario
- Ironwood Ridge High School, Oro Valley, Arizona
- Indian River High School (disambiguation), several in the United States
- Institute of Research in Horticulture and Seeds, public organisation of agronomic research, France
