= James R. Abernathy =

American politician and lawyer

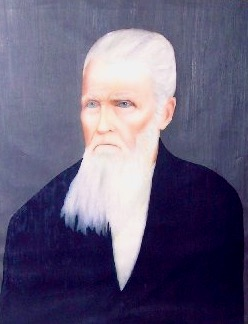
- James R. Abernathy (1795-1886)

Monroe County, Missouri, Treasurer
- In office 1831–1843

Monroe County, Missouri, District Attorney
- In office 1838–1848

Monroe County, Missouri, County Clerk
- In office 1853–1860

Monroe County, Missouri, Justice of the peace
- In office 1860–1876

Monroe County, Missouri, Judge
- In office 1876–1880

Personal details
- Born: February 25, 1795 Lunenburg, Virginia, US
- Died: January 29, 1886 (aged 90) Paris, Missouri, US
- Spouses: Jemima Winn (m. 1817; died 1822) Rosannah Davis (m. 1826; died 1840) Jane Davis (m. 1841)
- Children: 12
- Occupation: Attorney at law

Military service
- Branch/service: United States Army
- Years of service: February 8, 1815 – March 7, 1815
- Rank: Private
- Commands: Private in Captain James Dudley's Kentucky Militia
- Battles/wars: War of 1812

James R. Abernathy (February 25, 1795 – January 29, 1886), also known as "Old Abby," was a 19th-century school teacher, Attorney at law, district attorney, Justice of the peace, and politician in Monroe County, Missouri. He was a soldier in the War of 1812. At the time of his death, he was the oldest man in Monroe County. He was a resident of Monroe County for over half a century, prior to its organization as a county on January 6, 1831. He was an early settler of Paris, Missouri and Madison, Missouri.

== Early life and education ==
Abernathy was born in Lunenburg, Virginia, on February 25, 1795, a native of the Old Dominion. He was the son of Blackstone Abernathy (1767–1850) and Elizabeth Peterson Locke (1771–1849). His ancestors on both sides settled in Virginia prior to the American Revolutionary War (1775–1783). His father was one of the early pioneer settlers of Fayette County, Kentucky where they moved in 1797 and where Abernathy was raised. They and moved to Howard County, Missouri in 1817.

He was the father of Nancy Harrison Abernathy who married Dr. Hugh James Glenn, a wealthy California rancher and politician.

Abernathy became a farmer in New Madrid, Missouri and was in 1811–1812 New Madrid earthquakes. He lost everything in the quake. He taught school in Howard County, Missouri for a number of years.

He was a soldier in the War of 1812 from February 8, 1815 - March 7, 1815. Private in Captain James Dudley's Kentucky Militia He received a Widows' Pension (pension #WC-34734 on June 15, 1887.

== Political career ==
Abernathy was a member of the Whig Party, and later became a Republican. He began his political career in the early 1830s. He was one of the first settlers of Paris, Missouri, Monroe County, Missouri in 1831. The town was laid out by Abernathy, James C. Fox, and E. W. McBride, and in 1837, contained seven stores and a number of families. In Paris, he started a school for early settlers. He was a resident of Monroe County for over half a century, prior to its organization as a county on January 6, 1831. At this time, he was appointed him commissioner to sell the school lands. On March 10, 1832, he and seven others organized the first Christian Church in Paris.

In Paris, Missouri, Abernathy studied law and applied for a license after becoming interested in law after solving a case about a Bee gum that was stolen. He went before Judge Jack Gordon and was admitted to the bar in early 1831 when he was thirty-six years of age.

In 1831, Abernathy was the first appointed Treasurer of Monroe County and held that office for 12 years until he became district attorney in 1843. Abernathy who settled in Madison, in Monroe County, Missouri in 1836, named the town after President James Madison. Madison was only 12 miles west of Paris, Missouri. In 1837, he laid out and dividing 40 acres of land in the town into 90 lots, which he sold for $1,100 (equivalent to $31,301 in 2025).

In 1840, the first newspaper published in Monroe County was the Missouri Sentinel. In 1843, the paper was sold, and its name changed to the Paris Mercury. In 1844, Abernathy owned and edited the paper with John Adams. In 1845, he became the sole owner and ran it for seven years. He 1851 he published the Lagrange Missourian (was the Free Press), which was a new Whig paper at La Grange, Missouri, Lewis County, Missouri.

In November 1838, Abernathy was a prosecuting district attorney for the 4th Judicial Circuit of the Missouri Circuit Courts that was a 300-mile circuit and extended to twelve counties, composing Northeastern Missouri. He traveled the circuit three times a year on horseback. He held this office for ten years. In 1850, Abernathy was a candidate to represent the Third District in the Missouri State Senate.

He was a constable, then Justice of the peace for sixteen years. During the American Civil War he was a Union man.

Abernathy ran for judge of the Monroe county court. He ran against John Quarles and Ephriam Poet. He won the election and was re-elected a second term by Governor Thomas Clement Fletcher.

== Death ==
Abernathy died at his home in Paris, Missouri on January 29, 1886, at the age of 90 years. At the time of his death, he was the oldest man in Monroe County.
