= Indian Brook =

Indian Brook may refer to:

- Indian Brook, Victoria, Nova Scotia, on Cape Breton Island
- Indian Brook Band, a First Nations government of Mi'kmaq people
  - Indian Brook 14, Shubenacadie First Nation, Nova Scotia, an Indian Reserve for Mi'kmaq people
- Indian Brook Reservoir, Essex, Vermont, a drinking water impoundment reservoir
  - Indian Brook Town Conservation Area, a natural preserve to secure the Indian Brook Reservoir
  - Indian Brook Valley, a valley flooded to create the Indian Brook Reservoir
  - Indian Brook, a brook dammed to create the Indian Brook Reservoir
- Indian Brook Road Historic District, Garrison, New York

== See also ==
- Indian (disambiguation)
- Brook (disambiguation)
- Indian Creek (disambiguation)
- Indian Run (disambiguation)
- Indian River (disambiguation)
- Indian Stream (disambiguation)
