= Alexander State Forest =

Protected area in Louisiana, United States

- Location within Louisiana
- Location: Rapides Parish, Louisiana
- Nearest city: Woodworth, Louisiana
- Coordinates: 31.124085°N 92.488403°W
- Area: 8,000 acres (32 km^{2})
- Established: 1923
- Governing body: Department of Agriculture and Forestry
- Website: Website

Alexander State Forest is located in Rapides Parish, Louisiana near the town of Woodworth. It was established in 1923 as a state demonstration forest. It contains the Indian Creek Recreation Area and the Alexander State Forest Headquarters Building, constructed in 1935, is on the National Register of Historic Places.

== History ==
In 1923, the state of Louisiana purchased 2,068 acres from Mrs. Elise Polk Burrows, and named the land Alexander State Forest after Louisiana's first commissioner of conservation, M.L. Alexander. In the following 15 years, Louisiana made nine more purchases, bringing the total acreage of Alexander State Forest to 7,995 acres. Most of the land was barren when purchased. In 1933, the Civilian Conservation Corps (CCC) started extensive planting of pine trees and continued to do so until 1940. This is a successful example of reforestation. During this time, the CCC also built the log administration building on the site. The forest today consists of about 700 acres of bottomland hardwood and 4,800 acres of southern yellow pine. Most of the tree species are loblolly pine, a type of southern yellow pine, as well as some slash and longleaf pine. Other tree species include red oaks, water oaks, willow oaks, blackgum, sweetgum, beech and hackberry. Indian Creek Recreation Area constitutes 2,250 acres of Alexander State Forest.

== Multiple uses ==
Alexander State Forest is managed by the Louisiana Department of Agriculture and Forestry under the multiple use concept. Different uses include recreation, timber production, forest management research, wildlife habitats for threatened species and water and soil conservation.

=== Recreation ===
About 75 percent of the acreage in Alexander State Forest is used for recreation. This includes hunting, fishing, boating, swimming, picnics and camping at Indian Creek Recreation Area. The forest is known for its whitetail deer population for hunting, but other game species include quail, rabbit, squirrel and different waterfowl species. Fishing and camping are open year round.

=== Timber production ===
It is estimated that there are about 35 million board feet of timber. About 1.5 million board feet are harvested every year. This is an example of sustainable forest management of renewable resources. Using this method is an attempt to ensure that the pine forest habitat is not degraded by overexploitation.

=== Forest management research ===
A number of different studies have been conducted using data collected from Alexander State Forest. These studies range from the effects that different management methods have on the ecosystem to the effects different animal and insect species have on the pine trees.

A 1994 study in Alexander State Forest by Robert B. Ferguson and V. Clark Baldwin Jr. examined the effects of spacing in slash pine trees that had not been thinned. The trees were spaced from four feet apart to fourteen feet apart in order to study the best spacing distance for optimal growth. Ferguson and Baldwin showed that by the time the trees had aged fifteen years, there was a height difference of six feet between trees spaced four feet apart and the taller trees that were spaced ten feet apart. A 2005 graduate thesis by Jamie Schexnayder describes the effects of thinning on the yield of lumber for a plot of land in Alexander State Forest. Schexnayder examined how far pine trees had to be spaced apart before thinning had any significant effect on tree growth. The results of these two studies relate to increasing board density in proper forest management.

A 2004 graduate thesis by Keri E. Landry examined the effects of the red imported fire ant on the pine ecosystem at Alexander State Forest and the effects the insecticide Amdro had on the ecosystem. Amdro was effective in decreasing the population of red imported fire ants. In addition, the native ant population could better compete against the red imported fire ants in plots where Amdro was used. A 2006 graduate thesis by Lee A. Womack also assessed the effects of red imported fire ants on the pine ecosystem at Alexander State Forest, as well as the effects of Amdro on the ant population and the ecosystem in general. Womack's study suggested that the ants had little effect on the pine ecosystem and that, in concordance with Landry's thesis, Amdro was effective at controlling the ant population without harming other members of the ecosystem as well.

A 2008 thesis by Laura M. Palasz studied how burning affected the Henslow's sparrow population and their habitat. This study used Alexander State Forest as one of many sites. The paper suggested better ways to manage forests in order to increase Henslow's sparrow population density, such as conducting prescribed burns of the forest every two years instead of every year.

=== Wildlife habitats for threatened species ===
Alexander State Forest provides habitat for a number of different plant and animal species, some of which are threatened or near-threatened. The most often cited example is the red-cockaded woodpecker. This woodpecker is ranked as a G2 species globally and as an S2 species within the state of Louisiana. The United States Fish and Wildlife Service lists the red-cockaded woodpecker as endangered. The bird is listed on IUCN's Red List as vulnerable and is found in only 11 states today. These states are Louisiana, Arkansas, Mississippi, Alabama, Georgia, Florida, South Carolina, North Carolina, Virginia, Texas and Oklahoma. From 1993 to 2006, the United States saw an increase in clusters of red-cockaded woodpeckers from 4,694 active clusters to 6,105 active clusters. Other species in the forest include Henslow's sparrow and Bachman's sparrow. Both of these sparrows are near-threatened in the United States.

=== Water and soil conservation ===
The reservoir in the Indian Creek Recreation Area, in addition to recreation, is also used for irrigation of farmland during dry seasons, which saves drinking water from being used on crops.

== Other features ==
=== Woodworth Fire Tower ===
Woodworth Fire Tower, standing at 175 feet tall, is the tallest active fire tower in North America. It is also a benchmark for geocacheing.

=== The Half Festival ===
Indian Creek Recreation Area hosts an annual half marathon, 10K and 5K races. The course starts and ends within the recreation area. In 2012 the race was held on November 17.
