= Big Indian Creek =

Big Indian Creek may refer to:

- Big Indian Creek (Georgia), a tributary of the Ocmulgee River in Georgia, U.S.
- Big Indian Creek (Fox River tributary), in Illinois, U.S.
- Big Indian Creek (Putnam County, Tennessee), a tributary of the Caney Fork River in Tennessee, U.S.

== See also ==
- Indian Creek (disambiguation)
