= Madison, Missouri =

City in Monroe County, Missouri, United States

- City
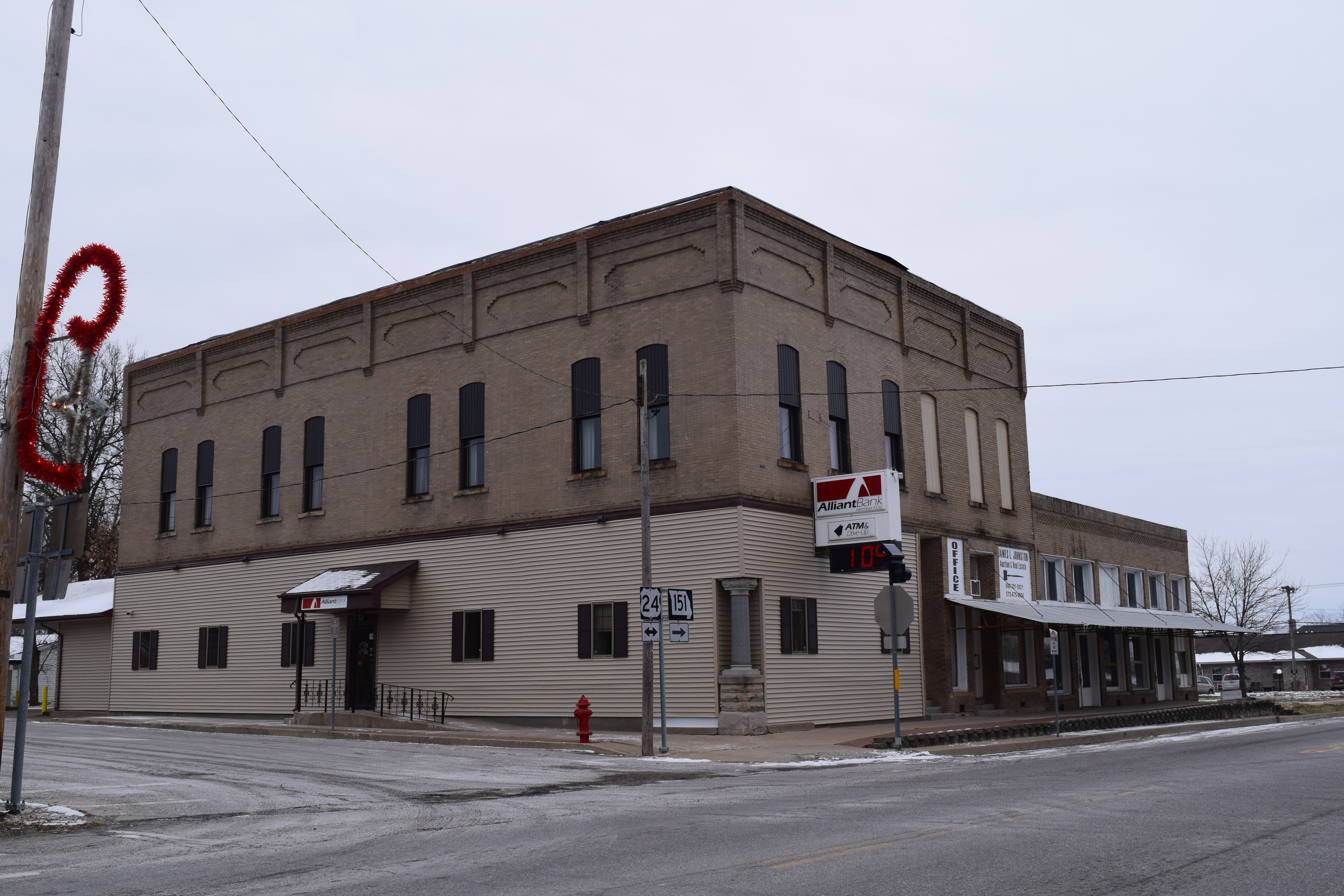
- Intersection of US 24 and MO 151 in downtown Madison

- Location in Monroe County and the state of Missouri
- Coordinates: 39°28′25″N 92°12′42″W
- Country: United States
- State: Missouri
- County: Monroe

Area
  - Total: 0.45 sq mi (1.16 km^{2})
  - Land: 0.45 sq mi (1.16 km^{2})
  - Water: 0 sq mi (0.00 km^{2})
- Elevation: 804 ft (245 m)

Population (2020)
  - Total: 515
  - Density: 1,150.4/sq mi (444.16/km^{2})
- Time zone: UTC-6 (Central (CST))
  - Summer (DST): UTC-5 (CDT)
- ZIP code: 65263
- Area code: 660
- FIPS code: 29-45470
- GNIS feature ID: 2395808
- Website: www.cityofmadisonmo.com

Madison is a city in Monroe County, Missouri, United States. The population was 515 at the 2020 census.

== History ==
The first settlement at Madison was made in 1836. James R. Abernathy settled in Madison in that year, and named the town after James Madison, the fourth President of the United States. In 1837, Abernathy laid out and divided 40 acres of land in the town into 90 lots, which he sold for $1,100 (equivalent to $31,301 in 2025).

A post office called Madison has existed since 1837.

== Geography ==
Madison is in western Monroe County along U.S. Route 24 (Broadway Street), which leads east 11 miles (18 km) to Paris, the county seat, and west 14 miles (23 km) to Moberly. Missouri Route 151 also passes through the center of Madison, leading north 21 miles (34 km) to Clarence and south 22 miles (35 km) to Centralia.

According to the U.S. Census Bureau, Madison has a total area of 0.45 square miles (1.17 km^{2}), all land. Land within the city limits drains northwest to Pedee Branch, a north-flowing tributary of Flat Creek, which in turn leads to the Middle Fork of the Salt River; and southeast toward the Elk Fork of the Salt River.

== Demographics ==
Historical population
| Census | Pop. | Note | %± |
|---|---|---|---|
| 1880 | 315 | | — |
| 1890 | 486 | | 54.3% |
| 1900 | 538 | | 10.7% |
| 1910 | 688 | | 27.9% |
| 1920 | 646 | | −6.1% |
| 1930 | 664 | | 2.8% |
| 1940 | 625 | | −5.9% |
| 1950 | 571 | | −8.6% |
| 1960 | 528 | | −7.5% |
| 1970 | 540 | | 2.3% |
| 1980 | 656 | | 21.5% |
| 1990 | 518 | | −21.0% |
| 2000 | 586 | | 13.1% |
| 2010 | 554 | | −5.5% |
| 2020 | 515 | | −7.0% |
U.S. Decennial Census

=== 2010 census ===
As of the census of 2010, there were 554 people, 243 households, and 151 families residing in the city. The population density was 1,231.1 inhabitants per square mile (475.3/km^{2}). There were 281 housing units at an average density of 624.4 per square mile (241.1/km^{2}). The racial makeup of the city was 98.6% White, 0.2% Native American, 0.2% Asian, 0.4% from other races, and 0.7% from two or more races. Hispanic or Latino of any race were 1.6% of the population.

There were 243 households, of which 29.6% had children under the age of 18 living with them, 46.9% were married couples living together, 9.1% had a female householder with no husband present, 6.2% had a male householder with no wife present, and 37.9% were non-families. 34.2% of all households were made up of individuals, and 18.1% had someone living alone who was 65 years of age or older. The average household size was 2.28 and the average family size was 2.91.

The median age in the city was 40 years. 24.2% of residents were under the age of 18; 7.4% were between the ages of 18 and 24; 24.4% were from 25 to 44; 24% were from 45 to 64; and 20% were 65 years of age or older. The gender makeup of the city was 46.8% male and 53.2% female.

=== 2000 census ===
As of the census of 2000, there were 586 people, 258 households, and 176 families residing in the city. The population density was 1,314.3 inhabitants per square mile (507.5/km^{2}). There were 292 housing units at an average density of 654.9 per square mile (252.9/km^{2}). The racial makeup of the city was 99.15% White, 0.17% Native American, 0.34% from other races, and 0.34% from two or more races. Hispanic or Latino of any race were 1.37% of the population.

There were 258 households, out of which 32.6% had children under the age of 18 living with them, 54.3% were married couples living together, 10.1% had a female householder with no husband present, and 31.4% were non-families. 29.8% of all households were made up of individuals, and 16.7% had someone living alone who was 65 years of age or older. The average household size was 2.27 and the average family size was 2.77.

In the city the population was spread out, with 24.4% under the age of 18, 8.0% from 18 to 24, 26.5% from 25 to 44, 22.5% from 45 to 64, and 18.6% who were 65 years of age or older. The median age was 38 years. For every 100 females there were 90.3 males. For every 100 females age 18 and over, there were 82.3 males.

The median income for a household in the city was $28,125, and the median income for a family was $35,875. Males had a median income of $29,375 versus $19,327 for females. The per capita income for the city was $15,128. About 10.6% of families and 14.7% of the population were below the poverty line, including 22.7% of those under age 18 and 18.8% of those age 65 or over.

== Education ==
Public education in Madison is administered by the Madison C-3 School District, which operates one elementary school, one middle school and Madison High School.

Madison has a public library, a branch of the Little Dixie Regional Libraries.

== See also ==
- List of cities in Missouri
