= Sand Hill Creek =

- Location of the mouth of Sand Hill Creek

Location
- Country: United States
- State: New York
- County: Otsego

Physical characteristics
- Source
  - coordinates: 42°27′36″N 75°16′23″W
- Mouth: Susquehanna River
  - coordinates: 42°22′00″N 75°15′44″W
  - elevation: 1,014 ft (309 m)

Basin features
- Tributaries
  - right: Indian Creek

Sand Hill Creek is a river in Otsego County, New York. It converges with the Susquehanna River west of Wells Bridge.

== See also ==
- List of rivers of New York
- List of rivers of the United States
