= Dead Indian Creek =

Dead Indian Creek may refer to:

- Dead Indian Creek (Oklahoma)
- Dead Indian Creek (Oregon)
- Dead Indian Creek (Wyoming)

== See also ==
- Dead Injun Creek
