= Granville, Missouri =

Unincorporated community in Missouri, U.S.

Coordinates: 39°33′45″N 92°05′52″W

Granville is an unincorporated community in Monroe County, in the U.S. state of Missouri.

== History ==
A post office called Granville was established in 1858, and remained in operation until 1907. The community has the name of Granville Giles, an early settler.
