= Indian River School District =

Indian River School District is a name shared by several school districts in the United States.

- Indian River School District (Delaware) of Selbyville, Delaware
- Indian River County School District of Indian River County, Florida

== See also ==
- Indian River (disambiguation)
- Indian River High School (disambiguation)
