= Indian Creek High School =

Indian Creek High School may refer to:

- Indian Creek High School (Wintersville, Ohio)
- Indian Creek High School (Shabbona, Illinois)
- Indian Creek School, Crownsville, Maryland
- Indian Creek Senior High School, Trafalgar, Indiana

== See also ==
- Indian Creek Elementary School
- Indian River High School (disambiguation)
