= Indian Creek Township =

Indian Creek Township may refer to:

== Illinois ==
- Indian Creek Township, White County, Illinois

== Indiana ==
- Indian Creek Township, Lawrence County, Indiana
- Indian Creek Township, Monroe County, Indiana
- Indian Creek Township, Pulaski County, Indiana

== Iowa ==
- Indian Creek Township, Mills County, Iowa
- Indian Creek Township, Story County, Iowa

== Kansas ==
- Indian Creek Township, Anderson County, Kansas

== Missouri ==
- Indian Creek Township, Monroe County, Missouri

== North Dakota ==
- Indian Creek Township, Hettinger County, North Dakota
