= Casmaria atlantica =

Scientific classification
- Kingdom: Animalia
- Phylum: Mollusca
- Class: Gastropoda
- Subclass: Caenogastropoda
- Order: Littorinimorpha
- Family: Cassidae
- Genus: Casmaria
- Species: C. atlantica

Binomial name
- Casmaria atlantica Clench, 1944

Species of gastropod

Casmaria atlantica is a species of large sea snail, a marine gastropod mollusk in the family Cassidae, the helmet snails and bonnet snails.

== Description ==
The maximum recorded shell length is 45 mm.

== Habitat ==
The minimum recorded depth for this species is 7 m; the maximum recorded depth is 30 m.
