= Indian Creek Recreation Area =

Alexander State Forest
- Location within Louisiana
- Location: Rapides Parish, Louisiana
- Nearest city: Woodworth, Louisiana
- Coordinates: 31.131652°N 92.495356°W
- Area: 2,600 acres (1,100 ha)
- Established: 1973
- Governing body: Department of Agriculture and Forestry
- Website: Louisiana Department of Agriculture and Forestly

Indian Creek Recreation Area is a recreation area located inside Alexander State Forest in Rapides Parish near Woodworth, Louisiana. It includes Indian Creek Reservoir, which is an artificial lake developed with the aid of the Louisiana Forestry Commission, the Rapides Parish Police Jury, and the Lower West Red River Soil and Water Conservation District. The lake was created in 1970 as a reservoir for agricultural irrigation and for recreation purposes.
