= Evansville, Missouri =

THIS INFO IS INCORRECT, EVANSVILLE MO IS NOT IN MONROE COUNTY

Coordinates: 39.4497592°N 92.3024010°W

Evansville is an unincorporated community in Monroe County, in the U.S. state of Missouri.

== History ==
A post office called Evansville was established in 1872, and remained in operation until 1950. The community has the name of a railroad man, according to local history.
