= Ponderosa Park =

Ponderosa Park may refer to:

- Ponderosa Park, Colorado
- Ponderosa Park, Arizona
