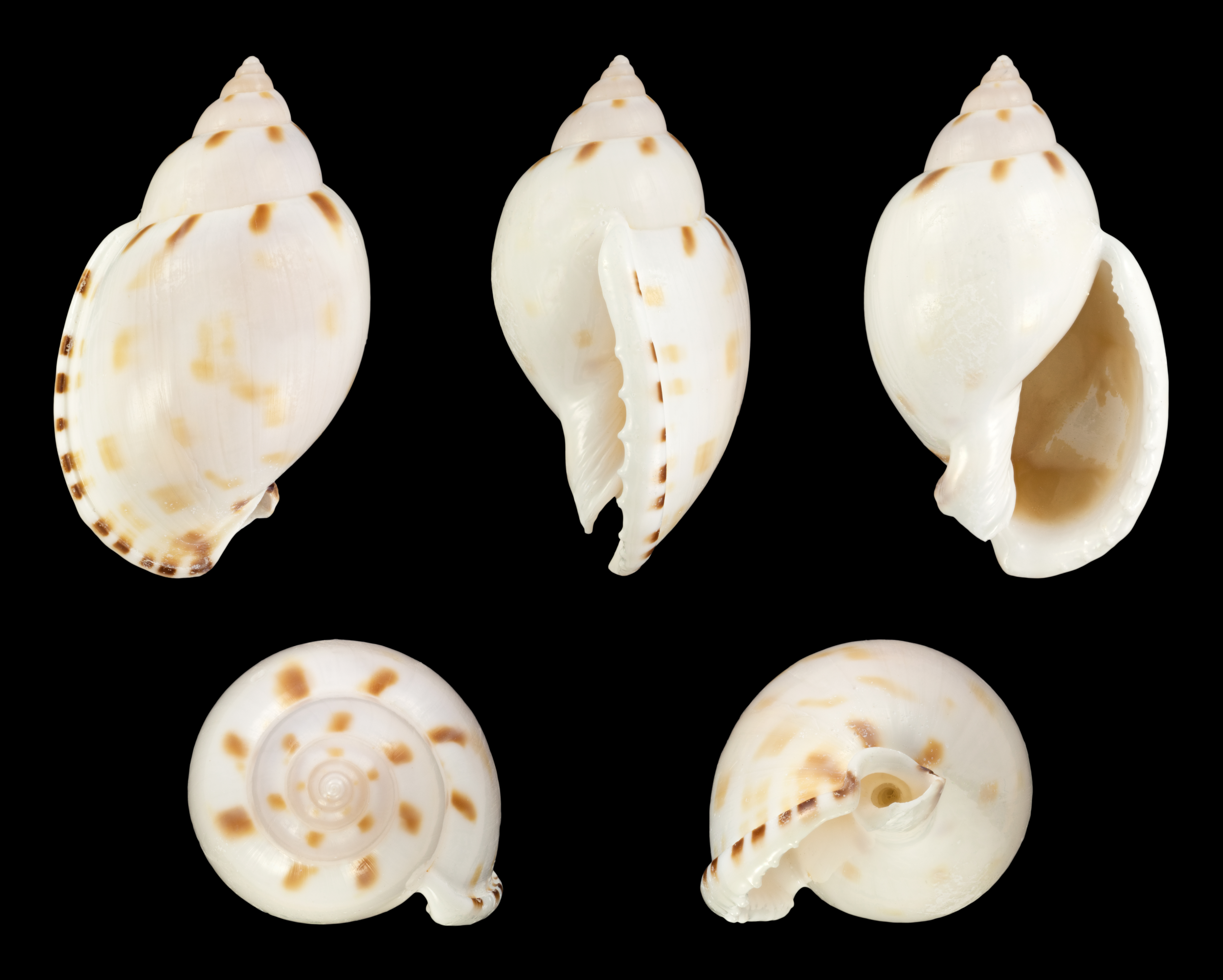

Scientific classification
- Kingdom: Animalia
- Phylum: Mollusca
- Class: Gastropoda
- Subclass: Caenogastropoda
- Order: Littorinimorpha
- Family: Cassidae
- Genus: Casmaria
- Species: C. ponderosa

Binomial name
- Casmaria ponderosa (Link, 1807)

Synonyms
- Buccinum biarmatum Dillwyn, L.W., 1817; Buccinum nodulosum Gmelin, 1791; Buccinum pantherina "Solander, D.C." Dillwyn, L.W., 1817; Buccinum ponderosum Gmelin, 1791 (original combination); Casmaria ponderosa ponderosa (Gmelin, 1791); Casmaria ponderosa var. bicolor Dautzenberg, 1926; Cassis tenuilabris Menke, K.T., 1828; Cassis torquata Reeve, L.A., 1848; Phalium biarnatum Dillwyn, L.W., 1817; Phalium ponderosa [sic]; Phalium ponderosum (Gmelin, 1791); Phalium quadratum Link, 1807; Phalium torquatum (Reeve, 1848)

= Casmaria ponderosa =

Species of gastropod

Casmaria ponderosa, common name the heavy bonnet, is a species of large sea snail, a marine gastropod mollusk in the family Cassidae, the helmet snails and bonnet snails.

== Subspecies ==
- Casmaria ponderosa perryi (Iredale, T., 1912): synonym of Casmaria perryi (Iredale, 1912)
- Casmaria ponderosa unicolor (Dautzenberg, Ph., 1926): synonym of Casmaria unicolor (Pallary, 1926)

== Description ==
The size of an adult shell varies between 30 mm and 100 mm.

== Distribution ==
This species occurs in the Red Sea, in the Indian Ocean along the Mascarene Basin, in the Pacific Ocean off Hawaii, and in Australia, Papua New Guinea, Solomon Islands, New Caledonia, Fiji, and Vanuatu.
