= Clapper, Missouri =

Unincorporated community in Missouri, U.S.

Coordinates: 39°35′24″N 91°50′43″W

Clapper is an unincorporated community in Monroe County, in the U.S. state of Missouri.

== History ==
A post office called Clapper was established in 1872, and remained in operation until 1906. The community has the name of Henry Clapper, a railroad promoter.
