= Indian Stream (disambiguation) =

Indian Stream may refer to:

- Indian Stream, a stream in New Hampshire, a tributary of the Connecticut River
- Republic of Indian Stream (1832–1835), an unrecognized country existing in disputed territory between Canada and the United States, now part of New Hampshire
- Indian Stream Schoolhouse, Pittsburg, New Hampshire, USA; an NRHP-listed building

== See also ==
- Indian (disambiguation)
- Stream (disambiguation)
- Indian Brook (disambiguation)
- Indian Creek (disambiguation)
- Indian River (disambiguation)
- Indian Run (disambiguation)
