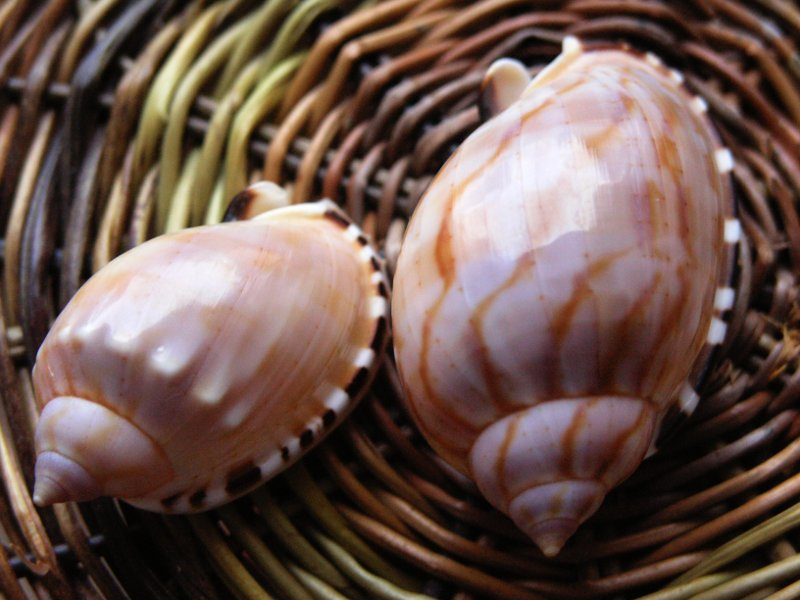
- Dorsal view of two shells of Casmaria ponderosa from the Philippines

Scientific classification
- Kingdom: Animalia
- Phylum: Mollusca
- Class: Gastropoda
- Subclass: Caenogastropoda
- Order: Littorinimorpha
- Superfamily: Tonnoidea
- Family: Cassidae
- Genus: Casmaria; H. Adams & A. Adams, 1853

Type species
- Buccinum vibex Linnaeus, 1758

Synonyms
- Cassis (Casmaria); Phalium (Casmaria) Adams, 1853; Semicassis (Casmaria) H. Adams & A. Adams, 1853 (original rank)

= Casmaria =

Genus of gastropods

Casmaria, is a genus of medium-sized sea snails, marine gastropod molluscs in the subfamily Phaliinae of the family Cassidae, the helmet shells and their allies.

== Species ==
Species within the genus Casmaria include:

- Casmaria atlantica Clench, 1944
- Casmaria beui Buijse, Dekker & Verbinnen, 2013
- Casmaria boblehmani Fedosov, Olivera, Watkins & Barkalova, 2014
- Casmaria cernica (G. B. Sowerby III, 1888)
- Casmaria erinaceus (Linnaeus, 1758)
- Casmaria kalosmodix (Melvill, 1883)
- Casmaria kayae Buijse, Dekker & Verbinnen, 2013
- Casmaria natalensis Aiken & Seccombe, 2019
- Casmaria perryi (Iredale, 1912)
- Casmaria ponderosa (Gmelin, 1791)
- Casmaria turgida (Reeve, 1848)
- Casmaria unicolor (Pallary, 1926)

Species brought into synonymy

- Casmaria decipiens Kilburn, R.N., 1980: synonym of Phalium decipiens Kilburn, 1980
- Casmaria erinacea: synonym of Casmaria erinaceus (Linnaeus, 1758)
- Cascara vibexmexicana (Stearns, 1894) : synonym of Casmaria erinaceus (Linnaeus, 1758)
