= Indian Creek (Sand Hill Creek tributary) =

- Location of the mouth of Indian Creek

Location
- Country: United States
- State: New York
- County: Otsego

Physical characteristics
- Source
  - coordinates: 42°24′59″N 75°17′29″W
- Mouth: Sand Hill Creek
  - coordinates: 42°22′35″N 75°15′43″W
  - elevation: 1,093 ft (333 m)

Indian Creek is a river in Otsego County, New York. It converges with Sand Hill Creek west-northwest of Wells Bridge.
