= Strother, Missouri =

Extinct community in Missouri, U.S.

Coordinates: 39°25′32″N 91°53′19″W

Strother is an extinct community in Monroe County, in the U.S. state of Missouri.

== History ==
A post office called Strother was established in 1884, and remained in operation until 1938. The community has the name of French Strother, a local educator.
