= Indian Lake (Indiana) =

Reservoir in Marion County, Indiana, U.S.

- Location within Indiana Location within the United States
- Location: Marion County, Indiana
- Coordinates: 39°53′0″N 85°59′20″W
- Type: Reservoir
- Primary inflows: Indian Creek
- Primary outflows: Indian Creek
- Basin countries: United States
- Surface area: 60 acres (24 ha)
- Surface elevation: 774 ft (236 m)

Indian Lake is a reservoir in the city of Lawrence in Marion County, Indiana, United States. It is approximately 11 miles (20 km) northeast of downtown Indianapolis. It was created in 1929 by damming Indian Creek, a tributary to Fall Creek.

Prior to the creation of Geist Reservoir in 1943 and Eagle Creek Reservoir in 1967, Indian Lake was the largest body of water in Marion County.
