= Dayton Township, LaSalle County, Illinois =

Coordinates: 41°25′20″N 88°48′37″W

Dayton Township
- Township
- Location in LaSalle County

- LaSalle County's location in Illinois
- Country: United States
- State: Illinois
- County: LaSalle
- Established: November 6, 1849

Area
  - Total: 21.34 sq mi (55.3 km^{2})
  - Land: 21.10 sq mi (54.6 km^{2})
  - Water: 0.24 sq mi (0.62 km^{2}) 1.13%

Population (2020)
  - Total: 2,455
  - Density: 116.4/sq mi (44.92/km^{2})
- Time zone: UTC-6 (CST)
  - Summer (DST): UTC-5 (CDT)
- FIPS code: 17-099-18784

Dayton Township is located in LaSalle County, Illinois. As of the 2020 census, its population was 2,455 and it contained 979 housing units.

It contains the census-designated places of Dayton and Wedron.

== Geography ==
According to the 2021 census gazetteer files, Dayton Township has a total area of 21.34 square miles (55.27 km^{2}), of which 21.10 square miles (54.65 km^{2}) (or 98.87%) is land and 0.24 square miles (0.62 km^{2}) (or 1.13%) is water.

== Demographics ==
As of the 2020 census there were 2,455 people, 969 households, and 723 families residing in the township. The population density was 115.06 inhabitants per square mile (44.42/km^{2}). There were 979 housing units at an average density of 45.88 per square mile (17.71/km^{2}). The racial makeup of the township was 87.90% White, 2.85% African American, 0.29% Native American, 1.75% Asian, 0.00% Pacific Islander, 1.43% from other races, and 5.78% from two or more races. Hispanic or Latino of any race were 7.29% of the population.

There were 969 households, out of which 34.40% had children under the age of 18 living with them, 55.93% were married couples living together, 16.82% had a female householder with no spouse present, and 25.39% were non-families. 20.80% of all households were made up of individuals, and 9.20% had someone living alone who was 65 years of age or older. The average household size was 2.60 and the average family size was 3.06.

The township's age distribution consisted of 26.0% under the age of 18, 6.8% from 18 to 24, 27% from 25 to 44, 27.4% from 45 to 64, and 12.7% who were 65 years of age or older. The median age was 38.7 years. For every 100 females, there were 143.9 males. For every 100 females age 18 and over, there were 115.6 males.

The median income for a household in the township was $73,104, and the median income for a family was $78,750. Males had a median income of $62,731 versus $26,694 for females. The per capita income for the township was $30,079. About 14.9% of families and 16.0% of the population were below the poverty line, including 25.7% of those under age 18 and 1.8% of those age 65 or over.

Historical population
Census	Pop.	Note	%±
2010	2,279		—
2020	2,455		7.7%
U.S. Decennial Census
