= Woodlawn, Missouri =

Unincorporated community in Missouri, U.S.

Coordinates: 39°34′42″N 92°12′46″W

Woodlawn is an unincorporated community in Monroe County, in the U.S. state of Missouri.

== History ==
A post office called Woodlawn was established in 1844, and remained in operation until 1907. The community is located in Woodlawn Township, hence the name.
