= Ponderosa =

Ponderosa may refer to:

== Places ==
- Ponderosa, California, a census-designated place in Tulare County, California, United States
- Ponderosa, New Mexico, a census-designated place in Sandoval County, New Mexico, United States
- Village of Ponderosa, a New Urbanism-inspired community in West Des Moines, Iowa, United States

== Entertainment ==
- Ponderosa (film), a 2026 American comedy-drama horror mystery film
- Ponderosa (TV series), a 2001–2002 television series that was the prequel to Bonanza
- Fictional family in the show It's Always Sunny In Philadelphia
- Ponderosa, fictional ranch bordering the northeast side of Lake Tahoe in the American television series Bonanza
- Ponderosa, a title used for reruns of the American television series Bonanza during the summer of 1972
- Ponderosa, an American Southern rock band
- Ponderosa, a track on the album Maxinquaye by Tricky
- 'The Ponderosa', the home of Bryn Cartwright in the 1997 British dark comedy crime film Twin Town

== Schools ==
- Ponderosa Elementary School (South San Francisco), an elementary school located in South San Francisco, California, United States
- Ponderosa High School (California), a member of the El Dorado Union High School District in Shingle Springs, California, United States
- Ponderosa High School (Colorado), a public high school in Parker, Colorado, United States

== Plants ==
- Ponderosa pine, a widespread and variable pine native to western North America

== Other ==
- Ponderosa (Sheffield), an open space / recreation area in Sheffield, England
- Ponderosa (typeface), Adobe's version of French Clarendon XXX Condensed
- Ponderosa lemon (limon × medica), a citrus species thought to be a hybrid of a lemon and a citron
- Ponderosa Lodge, an historic lodge in Black Forest, Colorado
- Ponderosa Park (disambiguation)
- Ponderosa Ranch, a real-life amusement park which was located on the set of the fictitious setting of the television series Bonanza
- Ponderosa Steakhouse, a restaurant chain that primarily serves steaks
- Ponderosa Stomp, an annual American roots music festival dedicated to recognizing the architects of rock-n-roll, blues, jazz, country, swamp pop and soul music
- Ponderosa Sun Club, a nudist resort in Roselawn, Indiana, United States

== See also ==
- Ponterosa, a 2001 Finnish film
