= Pedee Branch =

Stream in the American state of Missouri

Coordinates: 39.4983705°N 92.2160102°W

Pedee Branch is a stream in Monroe County in the U.S. state of Missouri. It is a tributary of Flat Creek.

Pedee Branch most likely derives its name from an unidentified Native American language.

== See also ==
- List of rivers of Missouri
