= Ash, Missouri =

Unincorporated community in Missouri, U.S.

Coordinates: 39°30′54″N 92°17′24″W

Ash is an unincorporated community in Monroe County in the U.S. state of Missouri.

== History ==
A post office called Ash was established in 1884 and remained in operation until 1904. William P. Ash, an early postmaster, gave the community his last name.

In 1925, Ash had 36 inhabitants.
