= Wedron, Illinois =

Unincorporated community in Illinois, US

- Unincorporated community
- Location within Illinois Location within the United States
- Coordinates: 41°26′19″N 88°46′28″W
- Country: United States
- State: Illinois
- County: LaSalle
- Township: Dayton

Area
  - Total: 0.55 sq mi (1.43 km^{2})
  - Land: 0.52 sq mi (1.34 km^{2})
  - Water: 0.031 sq mi (0.08 km^{2})
- Elevation: 548 ft (167 m)

Population (2020)
  - Total: 140
  - Density: 269.7/sq mi (104.14/km^{2})
- Time zone: UTC-6 (Central (CST))
  - Summer (DST): UTC-5 (CDT)
- ZIP code: 60557
- Area codes: 815 & 779
- GNIS feature ID: 2806578

Wedron is an unincorporated community in Dayton Township, LaSalle County, Illinois, United States. As of the 2020 census, Wedron had a population of 140. Wedron is located on the west bank of the Fox River, approximately 10 miles (16 km) northeast of Ottawa. The ZIP code is 60557.

== Demographics ==
Historical population
Census	Pop.	Note	%±
2020	140		—
U.S. Decennial Census

Wedron first appeared as a census designated place in the 2020 U.S. census.

As of the 2020 census there were 140 people, 79 households, and 79 families residing in the CDP. The population density was 253.62 inhabitants per square mile (97.92/km^{2}). There were 73 housing units at an average density of 132.25 per square mile (51.06/km^{2}). The racial makeup of the CDP was 90.00% White, 0.71% African American, 0.00% Native American, 0.00% Asian, 0.00% Pacific Islander, 0.00% from other races, and 9.29% from two or more races. Hispanic or Latino of any race were 5.71% of the population.

There were 79 households, out of which 24.1% had children under the age of 18 living with them, 44.30% were married couples living together, 55.70% had a female householder with no husband present, and 0.00% were non-families. No households were made up of individuals. The average household size and family size was 2.15.

The CDP's age distribution consisted of 10.6% under the age of 18, 0.0% from 18 to 24, 22.4% from 25 to 44, 31.7% from 45 to 64, and 35.3% who were 65 years of age or older. The median age was 57.7 years. For every 100 females, there were 117.9 males. For every 100 females age 18 and over, there were 94.9 males.

The median income for a household in the CDP was $69,744, and the median income for a family was $69,744. The per capita income for the CDP was $36,771. No families and 0.0% of the population were below the poverty line.
