= Indian Creek Elementary School =

Indian Creek Elementary School may refer to:

- Indian Creek Elementary School - DeKalb County, Georgia (Atlanta area) - DeKalb County School District
- Indian Creek Elementary School - Indianapolis, Indiana - Metropolitan School District of Lawrence Township
- Indian Creek Elementary School - Trafalgar, Indiana (Indianapolis area) - Nineveh-Hensley-Jackson United School Corporation
- Indian Creek Elementary School - Olathe, Kansas (Kansas City area) - Olathe USD 233

== See also ==
- Indian Creek School - K-12 school in Maryland
