= Dän Tàgé =

Dän Tàgé Indian River

Location
- Country: Canada
- Territory: Yukon

Physical characteristics
- Source: Loon Lakes
  - coordinates: 61°10′33″N 134°12′04″W
  - elevation: 968 m (3,176 ft)
- Mouth: Teslin River
  - coordinates: 61°04′15″N 134°13′03″W
  - elevation: 658 m (2,159 ft)

Basin features
- River system: Yukon River drainage basin

The Dän Tàgé ("Person River", formerly the Indian River) is a river in Yukon Territory, Canada. It is in the Yukon River drainage basin, begins at the uppermost of the Loon Lakes, and is a right tributary of the Teslin River.
