= Indian Creek (Fall Creek tributary) =

Stream in Marion County, Indiana, U.S.

Coordinates: 39°53′07″N 86°00′09″W

Indian Creek is a stream in Marion County, Indiana, in the United States. It is a tributary of Fall Creek.

Indian Creek was so named from the fact that Native Americans used the area as a camping ground.

A 60-acre (24 ha) reservoir named Indian Lake was created by the construction of a dam on the creek in 1929.

== See also ==
- List of rivers of Indiana
