= Indian Creek (Cedar River tributary) =

Stream in Iowa, United States

Coordinates: 41.9653°N 91.5806°W

Indian Creek is a stream in Linn County, Iowa, in the United States. It is a tributary of the Cedar River.

== See also ==
- Indian Creek Bridge
- List of rivers of Iowa
