= 2014 Missouri elections =

Missouri elections, 2014
- November 4, 2014

The Missouri elections took place on November 4, 2014.

== United States House of Representatives ==
United States House of Representatives elections in Missouri, 2014
Party	Votes	Percentage	Seats before	Seats after	+/–
Republican	838,283	58.77%	6	6	-
Democratic	513,600	36.01%	2	2	-
Libertarian	63,682	4.46%	0	0	-
Independent	6,939	0.49%	0	0	-
Constitution	3,799	0.27%	0	0	-
Total	1,426,303	100.00%	8	8	—

== State Auditor ==
The 2014 Missouri State Auditor election was held on November 4, 2014, to elect the State Auditor of Missouri, concurrently with other state and federal elections.

Incumbent Republican State Auditor Tom Schweich ran for re-election to a second term in office.

2014 Missouri State Auditor election
Party	Candidate	Votes	%
Republican	Tom Schweich (incumbent)	935,675	73.33%
Libertarian	Sean O'Toole	251,601	19.72%
Constitution	Rodney Farthing	88,757	6.96%
Total votes		1,276,033	100.00%
Republican hold			
