= Indian Creek (Fox River tributary) =

Physical characteristics
- Source
  - location: Lee County north of Paw Paw, Illinois
  - coordinates: 41°42′12″N 88°58′26″W
- Mouth
  - location: Confluence with the Fox River north of Wedron, Illinois
  - coordinates: 41°26′24″N 88°45′46″W
  - elevation: 499 ft (152 m)
- Length: 52 mi (84 km)

Basin features
- Progression: Indian Creek → Fox → Illinois → Mississippi → Gulf of Mexico
- GNIS ID: 421866

Indian Creek, also known as Big Indian Creek, is a 51.5-mile-long (82.9 km) tributary of the Fox River in Lee, LaSalle, and DeKalb counties in Illinois.

== Course ==
Indian Creek rises north of Paw Paw, Illinois, near Shabbona Grove and joins the Fox River near Wedron. The stream meanders across parts of Lee, LaSalle and DeKalb counties. Indian Creek is part of the Lower Fox River watershed. Indian Creek travels near the communities of Paw Paw (in Lee County), Shabbona and Rollo (in DeKalb County), and Earlville, Harding, Serena, and Baker (in LaSalle County).

The U.S. Geographic Names Information System (GNIS) shows 22 streams bearing the name Indian Creek in Illinois.

== History ==
In 1830, William Davis settled with his family along Indian Creek where he built a sawmill in 1831. On May 21, 1832, between 20 and 40 Potawatomi and three Sauk attacked the Davis settlement at Indian Creek. In all, 15 settlers—men, women, and children—were killed. Two girls were kidnapped but later freed unharmed upon payment of a ransom.

The attack at Indian Creek was most likely spurred by the actions of a settler named William Davis. Davis was a blacksmith and a sawmill operator and had built a mill dam across Indian Creek to power the mill. The creek was a vital source of food to a nearby Potawatomi village. The Potawatomi were upset by the dam because it prevented fish from swimming upstream, requiring them to fish downstream of the dam rather than near their village. Keewasee, a young Potawatomi from the village, was particularly angry about the dam and insisted that Davis remove it. When his pleas went unheeded, Keewasee attempted to dismantle the dam himself. Davis caught him in the act and assaulted him, angering Keewasee further.

It is believed that the Potawatomi and three Sauk attackers were the only parties responsible for the massacre. Though the massacre occurred shortly after the start of the Black Hawk War, there is no evidence that Black Hawk sanctioned the massacre and the violence at Indian Creek is seen as an act of personal revenge which was peripheral to the war.

The creek also contributed to the settlement of Paw Paw by providing the fledgling settlements near Ross, Coon and Paw Paw Groves with potable water.

A monument for the Indian Creek Massacre stands at Shabbona County Park, southeast of Earlville, and between Earlville and Harding in northern LaSalle County. A lake and State Recreation Area named for Chief Shabbona, is located in the community of Shabbona, which was also named for the Indian chief.

== Tributaries ==
Paw Paw Creek is a short tributary of Indian Creek that runs in a southeasterly direction near Paw Paw, Illinois.
