= Indian Run (Hughes River tributary) =

Stream in West Virginia

Coordinates: 39°07′49″N 81°05′21″W

Indian Run is a stream located entirely within Ritchie County, West Virginia. It is a tributary of Hughes River.

Indian Run was named after the Native Americans (Indians).

== See also ==
- List of rivers of West Virginia
