= Indian Creek (Cole Camp Creek tributary) =

Stream in Benton County, Missouri, U.S.

Coordinates: 38.37884°N 93.23316°W

Indian Creek is a stream in Benton County in the U.S. state of Missouri. It is a tributary of Cole Camp Creek.

Indian Creek was named for the Indians who lived along its course.

== See also ==
- List of rivers of Missouri
