= Indian River (poem) =

Poem from Wallace Stevens's first book of poetry, Harmonium

"Indian River" is a poem from Wallace Stevens's first book of poetry, Harmonium. It was first published in 1917. Absent from the first edition of 1923, it appeared in the second edition of 1931. It is in the public domain.

Indian River

The trade-wind jingles the rings in the nets around the racks
by the docks on Indian River.
It is the same jingle of the water among the roots under the
banks of the palmettoes,
It is the same jingle of the red-bird breasting the orange-trees
out of the cedars
Yet there is no spring in Florida, neither in boskage perdu, nor
on the nunnery beaches.

== Interpretation ==
The linked prepositional phrases oblige the reader to construct complex visual images of the Floridian scenes, and the focus on jingling in each sentence brings sound to the images as well. The similarity of syntactic structure in the first three sentences induces an almost hypnotic effect, like repetition of a mantra. The final sentence may betray the poet's diffidence about the prospects for renewal, as in Depression Before Spring, or, as Cook suggests, it may simply reflect Stevens's belief that Florida had no spring.
