= Indian Creek (Thompson River tributary) =

Stream in the US states of Iowa and Missouri

Indian Creek is a stream in Decatur County, Iowa and Harrison County, Missouri. It is a tributary of the Thompson River.

The stream headwaters arise approximately two miles east of Lamoni, Iowa at 40°37′05″N 93°52′57″W and an elevation of approximately 1,065 ft (325 m). It flows south to southeast into Missouri to its confluence with the Thompson River at 40°29′20″N 93°48′29″W and an elevation of 830 ft (250 m). The confluence is in northeastern Harrison County approximately four miles north-northeast of the community of Cainsville.

Indian Creek took its name from the Indians who once used the area as a hunting ground.

== See also ==
- List of rivers of Iowa
- List of rivers of Missouri
