= Indian Creek (Establishment Creek tributary) =

Stream in the American state of Missouri

Coordinates: 37.9747757°N 90.1978958°W

Indian Creek is a stream in Ste. Genevieve County in the U.S. state of Missouri. It is a tributary of Establishment Creek.

Indian Creek was named for the fact Indians settled near its course.

== See also ==
- List of rivers of Missouri
