= Indian Creek Bridge =

- U.S. National Register of Historic Places
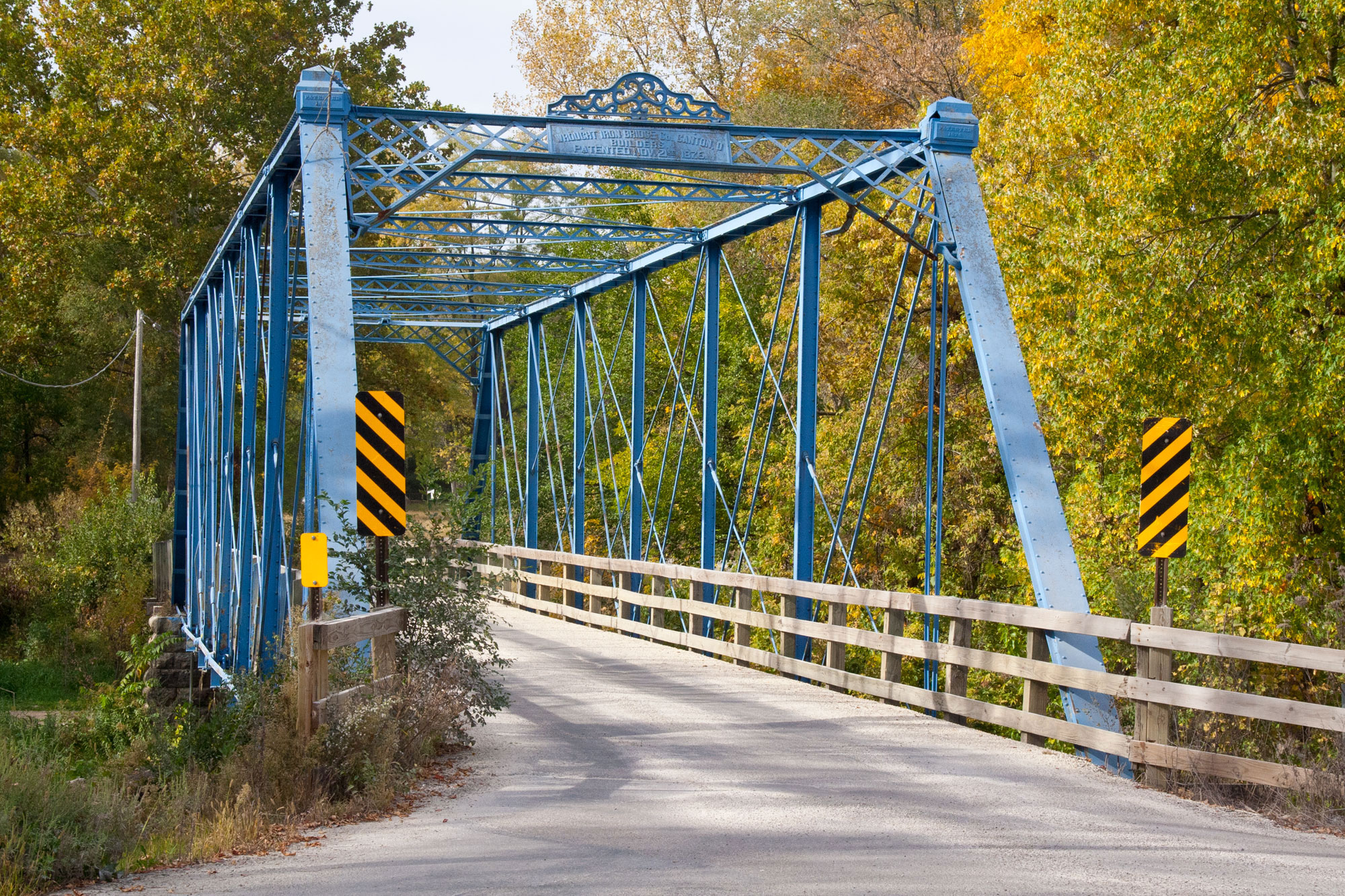

- Location within Iowa Location within the United States
- Nearest city: Cedar Rapids, Iowa
- Coordinates: 41°58′2″N 91°34′52″W
- Area: less than one acre
- Built: 1880
- Architect: Wrought Iron Bridge Company
- Architectural style: Pinned Pratt through truss
- MPS: Highway Bridges of Iowa MPS
- NRHP reference No.: 98000514
- Added to NRHP: May 15, 1998

The Indian Creek Bridge is a wrought iron bridge, built about 1880 to the east of Cedar Rapids, Iowa. The bridge crosses the Indian Creek, a tributary of the Cedar River, in Linn County. It was designed and built by the Wrought Iron Bridge Company (WIBCO) of Canton, Ohio as an eight-panel pin-connected through truss in an unusual double-intersection Pratt design.

The overall span measures 115 feet (35 m), carrying a 15.58-foot (4.75 m) wide roadway. Including the approach spans, the bridge has a total length of 191 feet (58 m). The bridge rests on stone piers and abutments, with timber pile piers and abutments supporting the timber stringer approach spans. The bridge deck is timber, laid perpendicular to the span. The bridge features decorative cresting and lattice lateral bracing. The truss uses rigid horizontal and vertical members and rod bracing for the diagonals.

The Indian Creek Bridge was placed on the National Register of Historic Places on May 15, 1998.
