= Indian Creek (Tippecanoe River tributary) =

Stream in Indiana, U.S.

Coordinates: 40°55′32″N 86°41′49″W

Indian Creek is a stream in the U.S. state of Indiana. It is a tributary of the Tippecanoe River.

Indian Creek was so named on account of the area being a favorite camping ground of the Potawatomi Indians.

== See also ==
- List of rivers of Indiana
