= Indian River High School =

Indian River High School is the name of several high schools:

- Indian River High School (Delaware), Dagsboro, Delaware
- Indian River High School (Ohio), Massillon, Ohio
- Indian River High School (Chesapeake, Virginia)
- Indian River Central High School, Philadelphia, New York
- Indian River Charter High School, Vero Beach, Florida

== See also ==
- Indian River (disambiguation)
- Indian River School District (disambiguation)
- Indian Creek High School (disambiguation)
