= Indian Creek (Hawk Creek tributary) =

Stream in Lincoln County, Washington, U.S.

Coordinates: 47°48′09″N 118°17′55″W

Indian Creek is a stream in Lincoln County, in the U.S. state of Washington. It is a tributary of Hawk Creek. Indian Creek was named for the fact it flowed past an Indian village.

== See also ==
- List of rivers of Washington (state)
