= Indian Run (Muskingum River tributary) =

Stream in Ohio, U.S.

Coordinates: 39°26′02″N 81°28′19″W

Indian Run is a stream in the U.S. state of Ohio. It is a tributary to the Muskingum River.

According to tradition, Indian Run was named from an incident when an American Indian went missing from his party after having boasted of the killing of a white pioneer settler.
