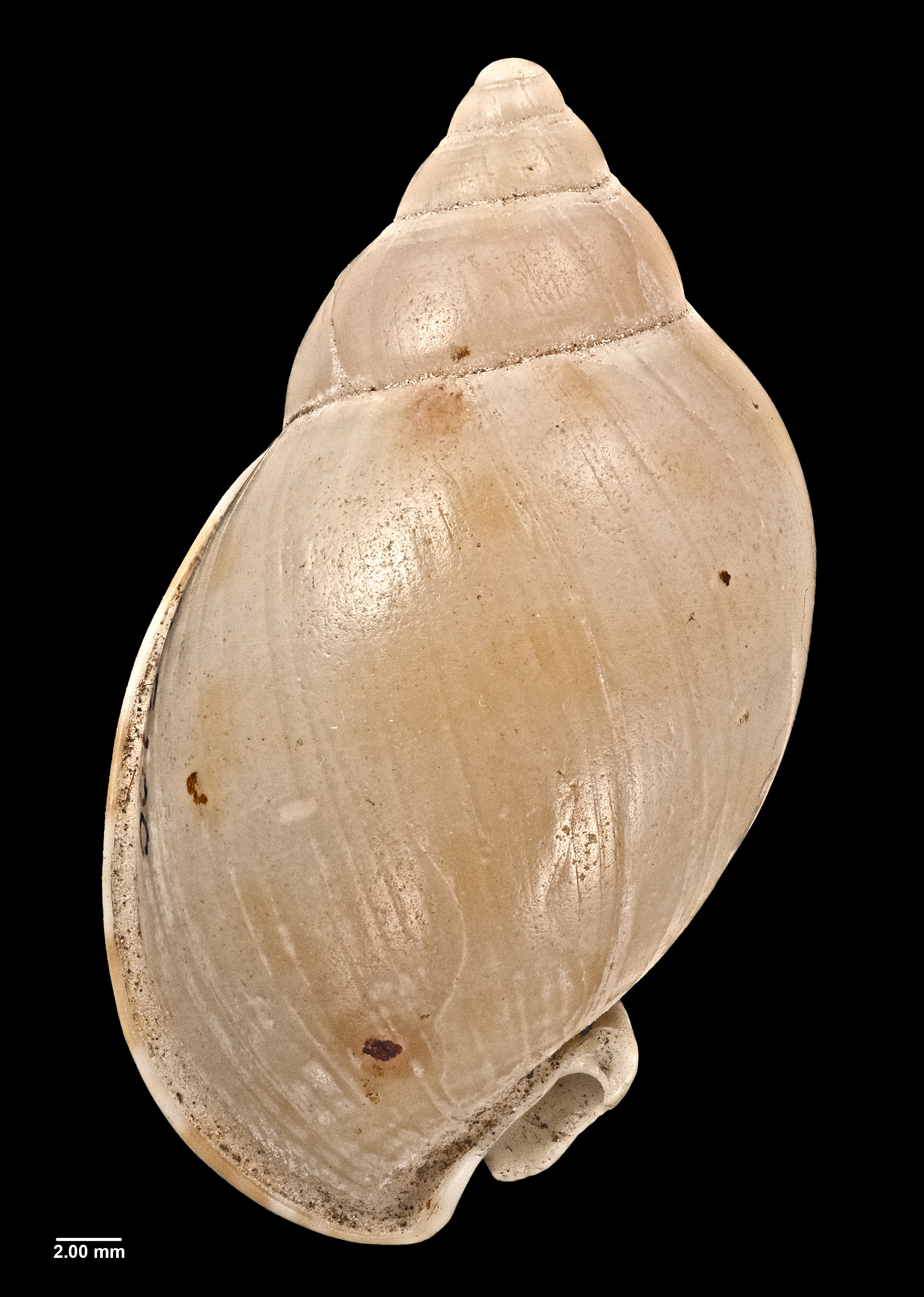
- Casmaria perryi (Iredale, 1912)specimen held at Auckland Museum licensed under CC BY 4.0

Scientific classification
- Kingdom: Animalia
- Phylum: Mollusca
- Class: Gastropoda
- Subclass: Caenogastropoda
- Order: Littorinimorpha
- Family: Cassidae
- Genus: Casmaria
- Species: C. perryi

Binomial name
- Casmaria perryi (Iredale, 1912)

Synonyms
- Casmaria ponderosa perryi (Iredale, 1912); Cassidea perryi Iredale, 1912

= Casmaria perryi =

Species of gastropod

Casmaria perryi is a species of predatory sea snails, marine gastropod molluscs in the subfamily Cassinae, the helmet snails and bonnet snails.

== Description ==
- Shell size: Adults range from ~30 mm to ~53 mm in length.
- Shell shape: It has a smooth, polished shell. Subspecies descriptions note a narrowly ovate form for some variants.
- Color: The shell coloration tends to be fawn or pale orange-brown, sometimes with reddish-brown spiral bands or maculations.

== Distribution ==
This marine species occurs off New Zealand, southeastern Australia and Easter Island.
