= Indian Creek (Niangua River tributary) =

Stream in the American state of Missouri

Indian Creek is a stream in northeast Dallas County, Missouri. It is a tributary of the Niangua River.

The stream source is at 37°44′54″N 92°58′51″W and the confluence with the Niangua is at 37°41′52″N 92°56′15″W

Indian Creek was named for a former Indian village along its course.

== See also ==
- List of rivers of Missouri
