= Indian Creek (Brandywine Creek tributary) =

Stream in Ohio, U.S.

Coordinates: 41°17′38″N 81°31′08″W

Indian Creek is a stream in the U.S. state of Ohio. It is a tributary of Brandywine Creek.

Indian Creek was so named on account the area being a favorite Native American camping ground.

== See also ==
- List of rivers of Ohio
