= Dead Warrior Lake =

Lake in Oklahoma, United States

- Dead Indian Lake
- Location within Oklahoma Location within the United States
- Interactive map of Dead Warrior Lake
- Location: Roll, Oklahoma
- Coordinates: 35.748°N 99.718°W
- Type: Lake
- Part of: Black Kettle National Grassland
- River sources: Dead Indian Creek
- Basin countries: United States
- Surface area: 80 acres (32 ha)
- Water volume: 977 acre-feet (1,205,000 m^{3})
- Shore length^{1}: 2.8 miles (4.5 km)
- Surface elevation: 2,090 feet (640 m)
- References: U.S. Geological Survey Geographic Names Information System: Dead Warrior Lake
- ^{1} Shore length is not a well-defined measure.

Dead Warrior Lake, sometimes known by its prior name of Dead Indian Lake, is a lake located about 3 miles (4.8 km) south of Roll, Oklahoma, and 11 miles (18 km) north of Cheyenne in Roger Mills County, Oklahoma, on US Route 283. The lake and the adjacent Black Kettle Recreation Area are all part of the Black Kettle National Grassland, which is managed by the Cibola National Forest.

The lake is about 80 acres (32 ha) in size. Popular species of fish caught here include flathead catfish, black drum, and blue catfish. The surroundings include amenities such as picnic tables, fireplaces, fishing piers, a boat ramp, docks, and a nature trail. Primitive camp sites are also available.

== Dead Warrior Creek ==
A watercourse called at that time Dead Indian Creek was dammed in the 1950s to create the lake, and the Dead Indian Lake name followed. Early settlers in the area gave the creek that name after discovering a Cheyenne burial site. Both the creek and the lake were rechristened in June 2006 to use the "Dead Warrior" name. This came about by a decision of the U.S. Board on Geographic Names which resolved almost a decade of controversy about whether the prior titles were offensive to Native Americans. The creek starts west-southwest of Roll, and proceeds generally southeast before becoming a tributary of the Washita River west-northwest of Strong City, Oklahoma.
