= Indian Creek (Des Moines River tributary) =

Stream in Humboldt County, Iowa, U.S.

Coordinates: 42.6763599°N 94.2132957°W

Indian Creek is a stream in Humboldt County, Iowa, in the United States. It is a tributary of the Des Moines River.

Indian Creek was named after the Native Americans who once used the creek as their camping ground.

== See also ==
- List of rivers of Iowa
