= St. Brides Correctional Center =

State prison in Virginia, U.S.

Coordinates: 36°36′38.4″N 76°10′58.2″W

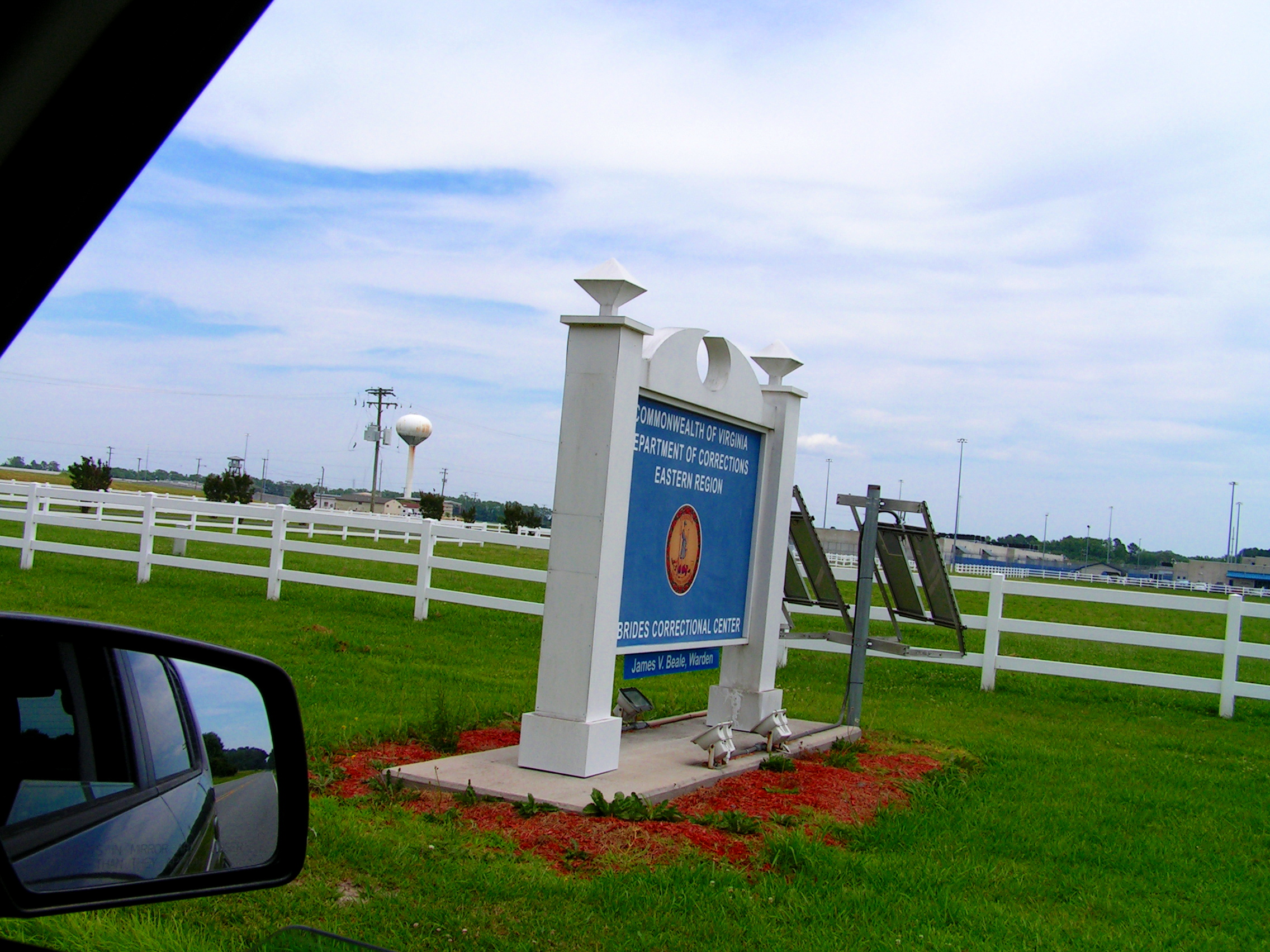
- Interactive map of St. Brides Correctional Center
- Location: 701 Sanderson Road Chesapeake, Virginia
- Security class: medium security
- Capacity: 1192
- Opened: 1973
- Managed by: Virginia Department of Corrections
- Director: Dara Watson, Warden

St. Brides Correctional Center is a state prison occupying 180 acres (0.73 km^{2}) in the city of Chesapeake, Virginia, first opened in 1973 and re-built in 2007.

The facility is a medium-security prison for men, owned and operated by the Virginia Department of Corrections. It lies in a rural section of the city, south-southeast of downtown Chesapeake, adjacent to another state prison, the Indian Creek Correctional Center. Its current warden is Dara Watson.
