= Indian Creek (Morgan County, Missouri) =

Stream in the American state of Missouri

Coordinates: 38°18′08″N 92°43′42″W

Indian Creek is a stream in Morgan County in the U.S. state of Missouri. It is a tributary to the Gravois Creek Arm of the Lake of the Ozarks.

Indian Creek was so named on account of Indian settlements near its course.

== See also ==
- List of rivers of Missouri
