= Indian Creek (Stone County, Missouri) =

Stream in the American state of Missouri

Indian Creek is a stream in the Carroll County, Arkansas and Stone County, Missouri.

The stream headwaters are at 36°23′26″N 93°28′30″W and the confluence with Table Rock Lake is at 36°31′10″N 93°31′21″W.

Indian Creek was so named on account of Delaware settlement in the area.

== See also ==
- List of rivers of Arkansas
- List of rivers of Missouri
