= Indian Creek (Iowa River tributary) =

Tributary of the Iowa River in Iowa, United States

Coordinates: 41.231417°N 91.236818°W

Indian Creek is a stream in Louisa and Muscatine counties, Iowa, in the United States. It is a tributary of the Iowa River.

Indian Creek was named after the Native Americans who once inhabited the area.

== See also ==
- List of rivers of Iowa
