= Indian Brook Reservoir =

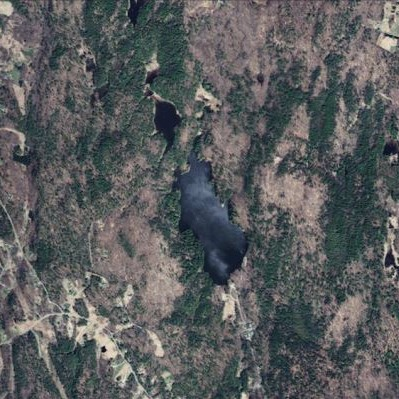
- Orthophoto of Indian Brook Reservoir, 2017

- Location within Vermont
- Location: Essex, Vermont
- Coordinates: 44.53499°N 73.09855°W
- Type: Reservoir
- Surface area: 0.24 km^{2} (0.093 sq mi)
- Surface elevation: 161 m (528 ft)

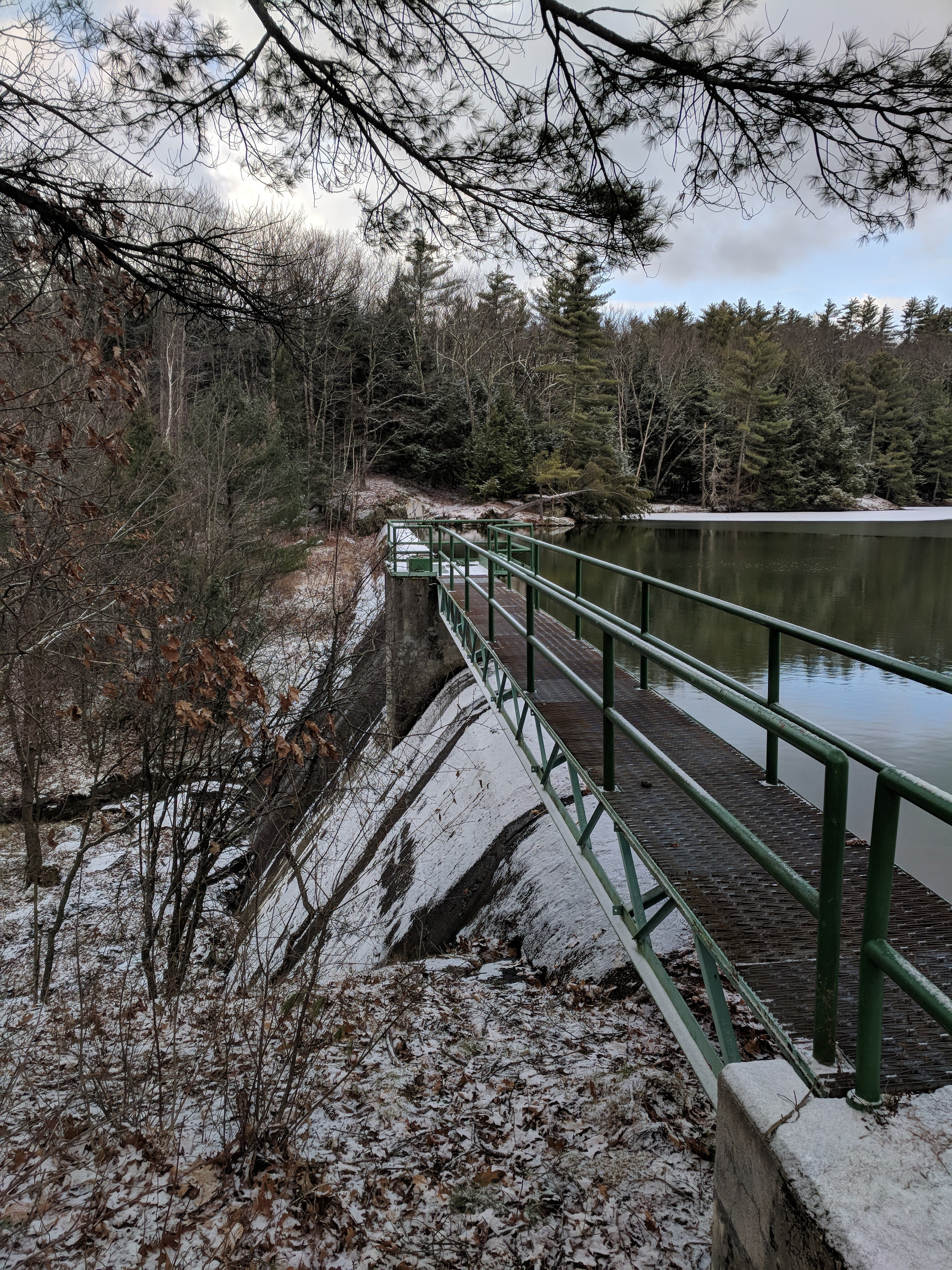
Indian Brook Dam

Indian Brook Reservoir is a 58 acre reservoir located in the town of Essex, Vermont. It is the focal point of the Indian Brook Town Conservation Area.

== History ==
The reservoir was created to address the increasing demand for water in Chittenden County. A series of droughts in the early 20th century led the village of Essex Junction to procure land for water conservation. On June 29, 1955, Essex Junction purchased 501 acres of land from various owners. In 1957, the village hired Knight Consulting Engineers, Inc. to build a dam across Indian Brook and flood the valley. The resulting impounded water formed a 58 acre reservoir and became the main source of water for the village. The land surrounding it was established as a water conservation area known as the Indian Brook Town Conservation Area.

In the early 1970s, the growth of the village was again restricted by inadequate water supply, so in 1973 the village officially connected to the Champlain Water District and discontinued use of the reservoir. The taxes on the land, and the need to repay the new water infrastructure debt and future costs, led to a push to sell and/or rezone the land. In August 1977, after a public bidding process, the village trustees sold the Indian Brook property for $167,000 to several private developers.

In November 1986, the town of Essex made a decision to purchase the land from private developers. On December 31, 1986, the land was purchased for $435,000. The Nature Conservancy provided a donation of $16,000. Following the purchase, the land was rezoned for open recreation.

In 1988, water was lowered in the reservoir to facilitate minor repairs on the dam. Parking lots and roads were also upgraded, a boat launch and picnic sites were established, the remains of the old water treatment plant were razed, and park signs and trail markers were added.

== Wildlife ==
The Vermont Fish and Wildlife Department stocks brook trout, brown trout, and rainbow trout.

There is a known blue heron rookery in proximity to the reservoir.

Hunting is prohibited within 500 feet of the reservoir, but is allowed elsewhere in the park.
