= Indian Run (Delaware County, Ohio) =

Coordinates: 40°23′42″N 83°2′38″W

Location
- Country: United States
- State: Ohio
- County: Delaware

Indian Run is a stream located entirely within Delaware County, Ohio.

Indian Run was named for the Wyandot Indians who hunted there.

== See also ==
- List of rivers of Ohio
