= Indian Creek (Monroe County, Missouri) =

Stream in the U.S. state of Missouri

Coordinates: 39°32′24″N 91°40′45″W

Indian Creek is a stream in Monroe and Ralls counties in the U.S. state of Missouri. It is a tributary to the Salt River within Mark Twain Lake.

The origin of the name Indian Creek is unclear. The creek may have been so named on account of the red tinted water.

== See also ==
- List of rivers of Missouri
