= Wells Bridge, New York =

- Hamlet and CDP
- Location within New York Location within the United States
- Coordinates: 42°22′07″N 75°14′44″W
- Country: United States
- State: New York
- County: Otsego
- Town: Unadilla

Area
  - Total: 0.90 sq mi (2.34 km^{2})
- Elevation: 984 ft (300 m)
- Time zone: UTC-5 (Eastern (EST))
  - Summer (DST): UTC-4 (EDT)
- ZIP code: 13859
- Area code: 607
- GNIS feature ID: 969039

Wells Bridge is a hamlet (and census-designated place) in Otsego County, New York, United States. As of the 2020 census, Wells Bridge had a population of 279. The community is located along the Susquehanna River and New York State Route 7, 4.2 miles (6.8 km) west-southwest of Otego. Wells Bridge has a post office with ZIP code 13859.
