= Ponderosa Park, Arizona =

- Populated place
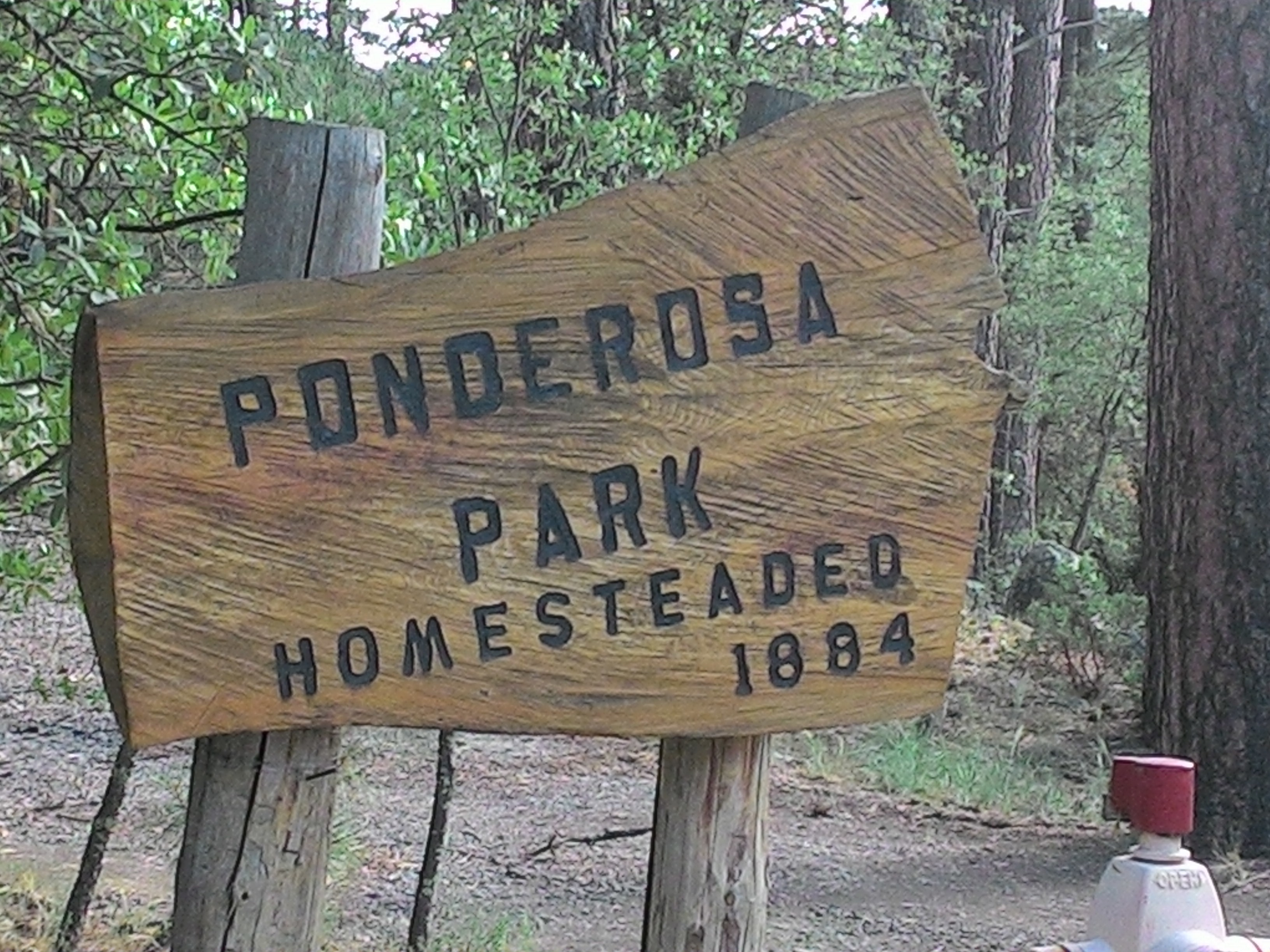
- Interactive map of Ponderosa Park, Arizona
- Coordinates: 34°28′16″N 112°29′26″W
- Country: United States
- State: Arizona
- Counties: Yavapai

Government
  - Type: Unincorporated community

Area
  - Total: 0.310686 sq mi (0.804672 km^{2})
  - Land: 0.310686 sq mi (0.804672 km^{2})
  - Water: 0 sq mi (0 km^{2})
- Elevation: 5,712 ft (1,741 m)
- Time zone: UTC-7 (Mountain (MST))
- ZIP code: 86303

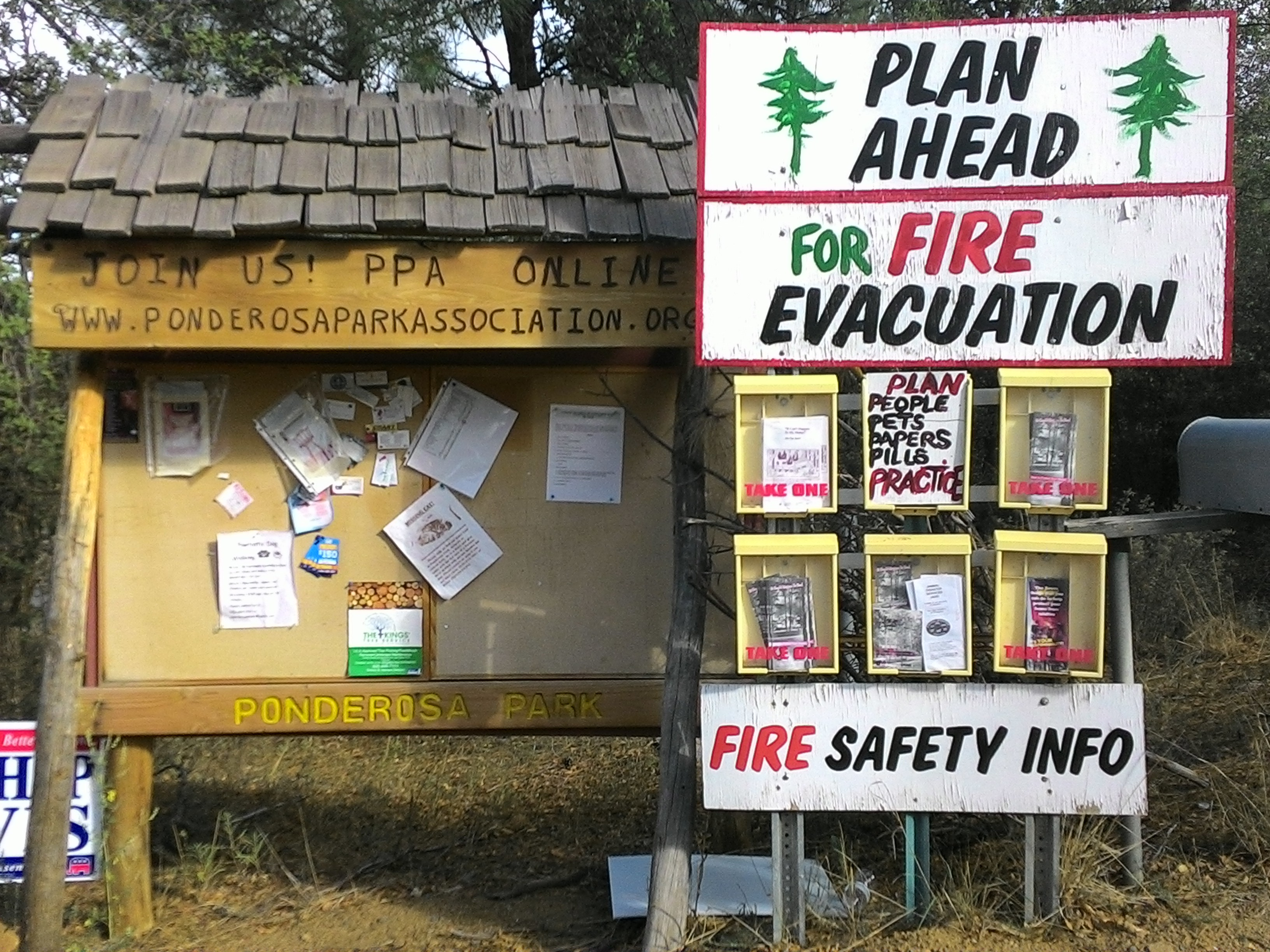
Ponderosa Park, Arizona

Ponderosa Park is a populated place in Yavapai County, Arizona, United States. Initially homesteaded in 1884 and named after ponderosa pines, the settlement is five miles south of Arizona State Route 89 in Prescott National Forest.

== Geography ==
Ponderosa Park is located at 34°28′16″N 112°29′28″W. It is located in a valley split by Indian Creek which flows into the Hassayampa River. The elevation of the Park varies based on location and ranges from 5,560 feet (1,690 m) at the creek at the southern end of the community, and rising to 5,760 feet (1,760 m) on both sides of the valley.

== Fire protection ==
Ponderosa Park is served by the Central Yavapai Fire District (CYFD). Station 56 is located just outside the community and houses Engine 56, a 1982 Ford Van Pelt carrying 750 gallons and Water Tender 56, a 1980 GMC carrying 1250 gallons. This is a reserve station and is not staffed. A firefighter/EMT lives on the property and when not working a shift at a staffed station, may be able to respond to calls within the community. If no one is available, CYFD has an Automatic Aid agreement City of Prescott Fire Department ensuring that the closest fire truck will respond to an emergency regardless of geographical jurisdiction. The closest staffed station is Prescott City station 71, which is approximately 4.5 miles (7.2 km) away, much closer than any staffed CYFD station.

== History ==
On December 13, 1884, Frederich Barth was granted Homestead Certificate No. 82, Application No. 200 signed by Chester A. Arthur, President of the United States. This Homestead was for 160 acres (65 ha) that now comprises Ponderosa Park.

Barth died in 1889 with no heirs and no will. In 1902, the Territory of Arizona filed claim to take possession of the land as there were no known claims to it, no tenants or others in actual possession. Notice of the court action, scheduled for June 2, 1902 was published in local newspapers.

Ownership of the property from 1902 until the 1940s is unclear. It is believed that the original homestead was divided and resold an unknown number of times. M. Adele and Lenord F. Albrecht bought pieces of the original property on August 15 and in October 1941. The property was subdivided into individual lots between 1954 and 1967. Lot prices were $2000 - $3000 in the 1960s.

== Community ==
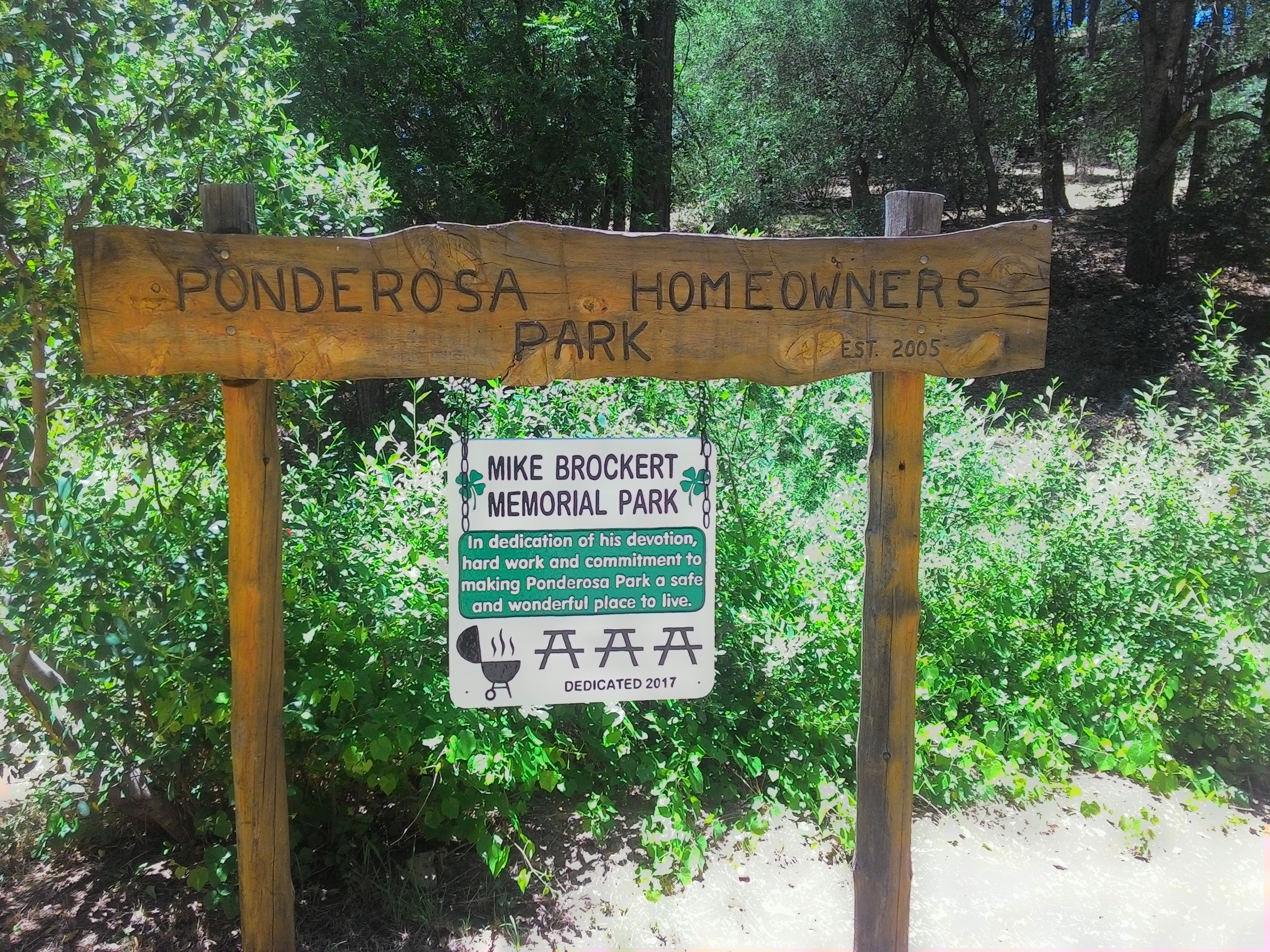
Ponderosa Park Picnic Area Sign

There is a community picnic area for use by residents. It is named Mike Brockert Memorial Park in honor of a long-time resident and community volunteer.
