= Indian Creek Correctional Center =

Prison in Virginia, United States

- Location in Virginia
- Location: Chesapeake, Virginia; 36.614°N 76.178°W
- Status: Operational
- Security class: Medium
- Population: 1,002 (June 2008)
- Opened: 1994
- Managed by: Virginia Department of Corrections
- Warden: John Walrath
- Website: Indian Creek Correctional Center

The Indian Creek Correctional Center (ICCC) is a Virginia Department of Corrections (VADOC) state prison for men. The prison is located in Chesapeake, Virginia, United States, approximately 5 miles (8.0 km) north of the North Carolina border.

The facility was opened in 1994 and specializes in long-term treatment of incarcerated substance abusers. The medium security facility houses inmates in dormitory-style quarters, split into six housing units. In June 2008, the prison had an average daily population of 1,002 inmates.

The ICCC is adjacent to VADOC's St. Brides Correctional Center, which houses inmates not requiring specialized treatment for substance abuse.

== History ==
In April 2014, reports of inmates being medically neglected were picked up by local media. One allegation described an inmate as being misdiagnosed with kidney stones by medical staff, who over the course of three months lost approximately 50 pounds (23 kg), and was later discovered through delayed testing to have terminal pancreatic cancer. Another inmate was alleged to have reported heart attack symptoms to medical staff, and was treated with Advil and was given a suggestion to schedule a follow-up appointment. The inmate allegedly died that night of the heart attack. The American Civil Liberties Union has accused the for-profit companies contracted by the Virginia Department of Corrections of withholding medical care to reduce expenses.

On November 8, 2014, inmate Dai’Yaan Qamar Longmire, 19, committed suicide while in solitary confinement at Indian Creek Correctional Center. A lawsuit filed by Longmire's mother against the Virginia Department of Corrections and ICCC, states he was diagnosed with bipolar disorder, depression, ADHD and anxiety before his incarceration in May 2014. The lawsuit alleges VADOC did not provide Longmire with medication for his conditions, which he had been taking prior to imprisonment. The suit further alleges prison staff failed to take precautionary measures for an inmate with a history of mental illness, such as placing Longmire on suicide watch, or removing bedding and other objects he could use to injure himself. Longmire had been held in solitary confinement as a punitive measure for misconduct from October 5, 2014, until his death, 34 days later.

In May 2016, nine inmates suspected of using scheduled narcotics were hospitalized with overdose symptoms. One of the inmates tested positive for opioids. The Virginia Department of Corrections stated procedural changes to visitation by the public may stem as a result of the incident.
