= Stoutsville, Missouri =

- Village
- Location in Monroe County and the state of Missouri
- Coordinates: 39°32′52″N 91°51′26″W
- Country: United States
- State: Missouri
- County: Monroe

Area
  - Total: 0.83 sq mi (2.16 km^{2})
  - Land: 0.82 sq mi (2.13 km^{2})
  - Water: 0.0077 sq mi (0.02 km^{2})
- Elevation: 610 ft (190 m)

Population (2020)
  - Total: 37
  - Density: 44.9/sq mi (17.35/km^{2})
- Time zone: UTC-6 (Central (CST))
  - Summer (DST): UTC-5 (CDT)
- ZIP code: 65283
- Area code: 573
- FIPS code: 29-71026
- GNIS feature ID: 2399912

Stoutsville is a village in Monroe County, Missouri, United States. The population was 37 at the 2020 census.

== History ==
Stoutsville was platted in 1871 and named after the family of Robert P. Stout, the original owners of the town site. A post office called Stoutsville has been in operation since 1872.

For at least 25 years during its early history, Stoutsville had been a sundown town, a place that forbade Black people to stay overnight. A sign once displayed near the railroad station read, "Mr. Nigger, don't let the sun set on you in Stoutsville."

== Geography ==
Stoutsville is in northeast Monroe County, adjacent to the Buck Creek confluence with Mark Twain Lake and just south of U.S. Route 24. Paris, the county seat, is 10 miles (16 km) to the southwest, and Monroe City is 11 miles (18 km) to the northeast via US 24.

According to the U.S. Census Bureau, Stoutsville has a total area of 0.83 square miles (2.15 km^{2}), of which 0.82 square miles (2.12 km^{2}) are land and 0.01 square miles (0.03 km^{2}), or 1.08%, are water. The village is in the watershed of the Salt River, an east-flowing tributary of the Mississippi.

== Demographics ==
Historical population
Census	Pop.	Note	%±
1880	118		—
1890	253		114.4%
1900	196		−22.5%
1910	315		60.7%
1920	247		−21.6%
1930	153		−38.1%
1940	179		17.0%
1950	146		−18.4%
1960	109		−25.3%
1970	61		−44.0%
1980	34		−44.3%
1990	26		−23.5%
2000	44		69.2%
2010	36		−18.2%
2020	37		2.8%
U.S. Decennial Census

=== 2010 census ===
As of the census of 2010, there were 36 people, 16 households, and 14 families living in the village. The population density was 44.4 inhabitants per square mile (17.1/km^{2}). There were 34 housing units at an average density of 42.0 per square mile (16.2/km^{2}). The racial makeup of the village was 94.4% White and 5.6% from two or more races. Hispanic or Latino of any race were 2.8% of the population.

There were 16 households, of which 31.3% had children under the age of 18 living with them, 81.3% were married couples living together, 6.3% had a female householder with no husband present, and 12.5% were non-families. 12.5% of all households were made up of individuals. The average household size was 2.25 and the average family size was 2.43.

The median age in the village was 48.5 years. 16.7% of residents were under the age of 18; 5.7% were between the ages of 18 and 24; 16.7% were from 25 to 44; 41.6% were from 45 to 64; and 19.4% were 65 years of age or older. The gender makeup of the village was 50.0% male and 50.0% female.

=== 2000 census ===
As of the census of 2000, there were 44 people, 24 households, and 15 families living in the village. The population density was 55.1 inhabitants per square mile (21.3/km^{2}). There were 41 housing units at an average density of 51.4 per square mile (19.8/km^{2}). The racial makeup of the village was 95.45% White and 4.55% Native American.

There were 24 households, out of which 4.2% had children under the age of 18 living with them, 62.5% were married couples living together, and 37.5% were non-families. 33.3% of all households were made up of individuals, and 8.3% had someone living alone who was 65 years of age or older. The average household size was 1.83 and the average family size was 2.20.

In the village, the population was spread out, with 6.8% under the age of 18, 2.3% from 18 to 24, 25.0% from 25 to 44, 31.8% from 45 to 64, and 34.1% who were 65 years of age or older. The median age was 52 years. For every 100 females, there were 100.0 males. For every 100 females age 18 and over, there were 115.8 males.

The median income for a household in the village was $31,875, and the median income for a family was $46,250. Males had a median income of $30,000 versus $13,750 for females. The per capita income for the village was $18,165. There were no families and 4.9% of the population living below the poverty line, including no under eighteens and none of those over 64.

== See also ==
- List of sundown towns in the United States
