= Indian Creek (Hughes River tributary) =

Coordinates: 39°04′58″N 81°08′19″W

Indian Creek is a stream located entirely within Ritchie County, West Virginia. It is a tributary of Hughes River.

Indian Creek was named after the Indians (Native Americans) who once dwelled in the area.

== See also ==
- List of rivers of West Virginia
