= Monroe County, Missouri =

County in Missouri, United States

- County
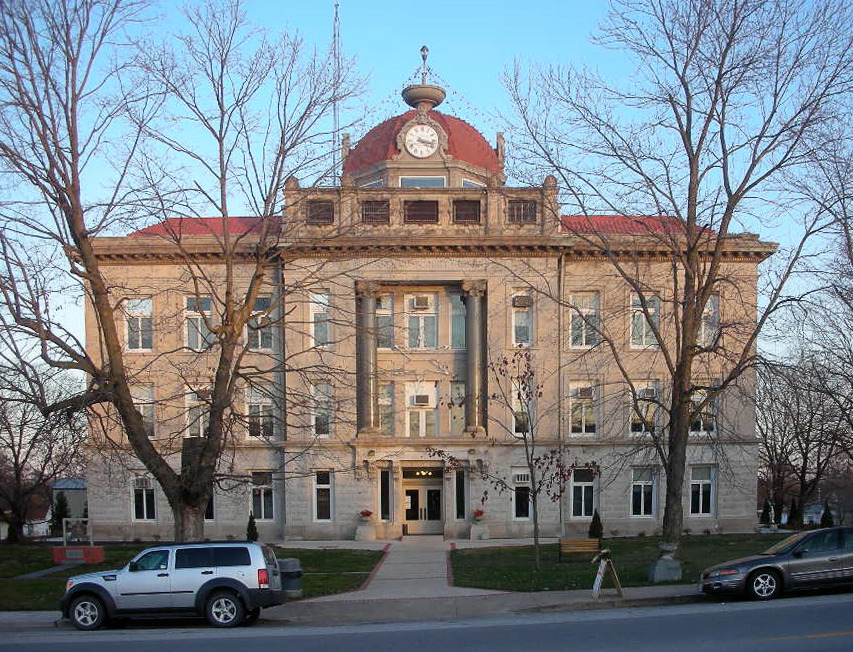
- The Monroe County Courthouse in Paris

- Location within the U.S. state of Missouri
- Coordinates: 39°30′N 92°00′W
- Country: United States
- State: Missouri
- Founded: January 6, 1831
- Named for: James Monroe
- Seat: Paris
- Largest city: Monroe City

Area
  - Total: 670 sq mi (1,700 km^{2})
  - Land: 648 sq mi (1,680 km^{2})
  - Water: 23 sq mi (60 km^{2}) 3.4%

Population (2020)
  - Total: 8,666
  - Estimate (2025): 8,959 ▲
  - Density: 13.8/sq mi (5.3/km^{2})
- Time zone: UTC−6 (Central)
  - Summer (DST): UTC−5 (CDT)
- Congressional district: 6th
- Website: www.monroecountymo.org

Monroe County is a county in northeast Missouri. As of the 2020 census, the population was 8,666. Its county seat is Paris. It is the birthplace of Mark Twain.

== History ==
The county was organized January 6, 1831 and named for James Monroe, the fifth President of the United States.

Monroe County was one of several along the Missouri River settled by migrants from the Upper South, especially Kentucky and Tennessee. They brought slaves and slaveholding traditions with them and quickly started cultivating crops similar to those in Middle Tennessee and Kentucky: hemp and tobacco. They also brought characteristic antebellum architecture and culture. The county was at the heart of what was called Little Dixie.

== Geography ==
According to the U.S. Census Bureau, the county has a total area of 670 square miles (1,700 km^{2}), of which 648 square miles (1,680 km^{2}) is land and 23 square miles (60 km^{2}) (3.4%) is water.

=== Adjacent counties ===
- Shelby County (north)
- Marion County (northeast)
- Ralls County (east)
- Audrain County (south)
- Randolph County (west)

=== Major highways ===
- U.S. Route 24
- U.S. Route 36
- Route 15
- Route 107
- Route 151

== Demographics ==
Historical population
Census	Pop.	Note	%±
1840	9,505		—
1850	10,541		10.9%
1860	14,785		40.3%
1870	17,149		16.0%
1880	19,071		11.2%
1890	20,790		9.0%
1900	19,716		−5.2%
1910	18,304		−7.2%
1920	16,414		−10.3%
1930	13,466		−18.0%
1940	13,195		−2.0%
1950	11,314		−14.3%
1960	10,688		−5.5%
1970	9,542		−10.7%
1980	9,716		1.8%
1990	9,104		−6.3%
2000	9,311		2.3%
2010	8,840		−5.1%
2020	8,666		−2.0%
2025 (est.)	8,959	▲	3.4%

=== 2020 census ===
As of the 2020 census, the county had a population of 8,666. The median age was 45.5 years. 22.5% of residents were under the age of 18 and 23.9% of residents were 65 years of age or older. For every 100 females there were 100.5 males, and for every 100 females age 18 and over there were 99.1 males age 18 and over.

The racial makeup of the county was 91.8% White, 2.1% Black or African American, 0.4% American Indian and Alaska Native, 0.4% Asian, 0.0% Native Hawaiian and Pacific Islander, 0.7% from some other race, and 4.7% from two or more races. Hispanic or Latino residents of any race comprised 1.8% of the population.

There were 3,565 households in the county, of which 27.1% had children under the age of 18 living with them and 22.6% had a female householder with no spouse or partner present. About 29.0% of all households were made up of individuals and 15.6% had someone living alone who was 65 years of age or older.

There were 4,466 housing units, of which 20.2% were vacant. Among occupied housing units, 77.6% were owner-occupied and 22.4% were renter-occupied. The homeowner vacancy rate was 2.3% and the rental vacancy rate was 9.3%.

0.0% of residents lived in urban areas, while 100.0% lived in rural areas.

=== Racial and ethnic composition ===
Monroe County, Missouri – Racial and ethnic composition Note: the US Census treats Hispanic/Latino as an ethnic category. This table excludes Latinos from the racial categories and assigns them to a separate category. Hispanics/Latinos may be of any race.
Race / Ethnicity (NH = Non-Hispanic)	Pop 1980	Pop 1990	Pop 2000	Pop 2010	Pop 2020	% 1980	% 1990	% 2000	% 2010	% 2020
White alone (NH)	9,282	8,675	8,769	8,340	7,902	95.53%	95.29%	94.18%	94.34%	91.18%
Black or African American alone (NH)	299	351	357	263	177	3.08%	3.86%	3.83%	2.98%	2.04%
Native American or Alaska Native alone (NH)	17	18	37	22	32	0.17%	0.20%	0.40%	0.25%	0.37%
Asian alone (NH)	31	12	11	27	31	0.32%	0.13%	0.12%	0.31%	0.36%
Native Hawaiian or Pacific Islander alone (NH)	x	x	3	1	1	x	x	0.03%	0.01%	0.01%
Other race alone (NH)	20	0	13	0	17	0.21%	0.00%	0.14%	0.00%	0.20%
Mixed race or Multiracial (NH)	x	x	69	102	347	x	x	0.74%	1.15%	4.00%
Hispanic or Latino (any race)	67	48	52	85	159	0.69%	0.53%	0.56%	0.96%	1.83%
Total	9,716	9,104	9,311	8,840	8,666	100.00%	100.00%	100.00%	100.00%	100.00%

=== 2010 Census ===
As of the census of 2010, there were 8,840 people, 3,656 households, and 2,566 families residing in the county. The population density was 14 inhabitants per square mile (5.4/km^{2}). There were 4,565 housing units at an average density of 7 per square mile (2.7/km^{2}). The racial makeup of the county was 94.66% White, 3.83% Black or African American, 0.41% Native American, 0.12% Asian, 0.03% Pacific Islander, 0.16% from other races, and 0.78% from two or more races. Approximately 0.56% of the population were Hispanic or Latino of any race. 24.7% were of German, 23.2% American, 14.2% English and 11.8% Irish ancestry.

There were 3,656 households, out of which 31.60% had children under the age of 18 living with them, 59.10% were married couples living together, 7.70% had a female householder with no husband present, and 29.80% were non-families. 26.50% of all households were made up of individuals, and 12.90% had someone living alone who was 65 years of age or older. The average household size was 2.50 and the average family size was 3.02.

In the county, the population was spread out, with 25.90% under the age of 18, 7.30% from 18 to 24, 25.00% from 25 to 44, 24.20% from 45 to 64, and 17.60% who were 65 years of age or older. The median age was 39 years. For every 100 females there were 96.40 males. For every 100 females age 18 and over, there were 93.10 males.

The median income for a household in the county was $30,871, and the median income for a family was $36,895. Males had a median income of $26,534 versus $20,440 for females. The per capita income for the county was $14,695. About 8.30% of families and 11.90% of the population were below the poverty line, including 14.00% of those under age 18 and 10.30% of those age 65 or over.

== Government and politics ==
=== Local ===
The Democratic Party used to dominate politics at the local, state and federal levels in Monroe County. However, like the rest of the state, the county has swung heavily towards the Republican Party in recent years, with Republicans now controlling 10 of the 13 elected positions in the county.

The GOP began to make gains in the county in 2006 at the state and federal level, and has gained ground in almost every election since.

Monroe County voters have selected Republican candidates over Democrats in 13 consecutive U.S. House elections (1998 through 2022), the last nine U.S. Senate elections (2000 through 2022), six continuous presidential contests (2000 through 2020), four of five gubernatorial elections (2004 through 2020), five of six state Senate races, and the last four state auditor races (2010 through 2022). In 2014, for the first time in history, Republican Jim Hansen defeated a Democrat to represent the county in the state House of Representatives. In 2016, for the first time in history, Ron Staggs, a Republican, was elected to a county office when he defeated a Democratic opponent for western commissioner. In 2018 two Republicans were elected to county offices: Talley Kendrick, the first Republican to run unopposed in a general election won as prosecuting attorney, and Lori Decker won a contested election for recorder. In the 2020 general election, four Republicans were elected to county office. In 2022, Curt Wheeler beat a Democrat and an Independent, to become the county's first Republican presiding commissioner.

In the 2008 general election, notwithstanding the secretary of state's race, for the first time in history, Monroe Countians gave a plurality to every Republican candidate for federal and state offices, on the ballot, that had a Democratic opponent. Four years later, in the 2012 election, Republican candidates won six of eight state-wide state and federal races, and one was lost by five votes out of more than 4,000 cast. In November 2016, 2018, 2020, 2022 every Republican for federal and state office, on the county ballot, defeated their Democratic opponent.

In the April 2016 presidential primary, Republicans outvoted Democrats more than 3-to-1, 1,600 votes in the GOP primary compared to 495 in the Democratic, and more Republican votes than Democratic were cast in the 2020 presidential primary. In 2016's August primary, Republicans out voted Democrats 895 to 698; in the 2018 August primary, Republicans out voted Democrats 1,621 votes to 851. In both the 2020 presidential primary and the August primary Republicans outvoted Democrats two-to-one.

Monroe County, Missouri

Elected countywide officials
Assessor	Melinda James	Republican
Circuit Clerk	Heather D. Wheeler	Republican
County Clerk	Beth Whelan	Republican
Collector	Chrissy Graupman	Republican
Commissioner (presiding)	Curt Wheeler	Republican
Commissioner (district 1)	Mike Whelan	Democratic
Commissioner (district 2)	Marilyn Morgan O'Bannon	Republican
Coroner	James K. Reinhard	Democratic
Prosecuting Attorney	Nicole Volkert	Republican
Public Administrator	Jessica Chase	Republican
Recorder	Lori Decker	Republican
Sheriff	Joe Collston	Republican
Treasurer	Shelia Jurgesmyer	Democratic

=== State ===
Past Gubernatorial Elections Results
Year	Republican	Democratic	Third Parties
2024	80.66% 3,475	17.75% 756	1.79% 77
2020	78.23% 3,472	20.28% 900	1.49% 66
2016	64.44% 2,659	33.13% 1,367	2.42% 100
2012	48.55% 1,948	48.68% 1,953	2.77% 111
2008	56.97% 2,459	41.94% 1,810	1.09% 47
2004	60.00% 2,576	38.90% 1,670	1.10% 47
2000	44.08% 1,801	54.19% 2,214	1.73% 71
1996	27.51% 1,053	70.72% 2,707	1.78% 68

Monroe County is divided into two representative districts in the Missouri House of Representatives, both represented by Republicans.

- District 5 — Lindell F. Shumake (R-Hannibal). Consists of Monroe City and the northern part of the county.

Missouri House of Representatives — District 5 — Monroe County (2016)
Party	Candidate	Votes	%	±%
Republican	Lindell F. Shumake	782	74.33%	+5.35
Democratic	O. C. Latta	270	25.67%	−5.35

Missouri House of Representatives — District 5 — Monroe County (2014)
Party	Candidate	Votes	%	±%
Republican	Lindell F. Shumake	367	68.98%	+27.93
Democratic	C. Leroy Deichman	165	31.02%	−27.93

Missouri House of Representatives — District 5 — Monroe County (2012)
Party	Candidate	Votes	%	±%
Republican	Lindell F. Shumake	429	41.05%	
Democratic	Tom Shively	616	58.95%	

- District 40 – Jim Hansen (R-Frankford). Consists of the communities of Florida, Holliday, Madison, Paris, Santa Fe, and Stoutsville.

Missouri House of Representatives — District 40 — Monroe County (2016)
Party	Candidate	Votes	%	±%
Republican	Jim Hansen	2,598	100.00%	+27.01

Missouri House of Representatives — District 40 — Monroe County (2014)
Party	Candidate	Votes	%	±%
Republican	Jim Hansen	1,208	72.99%	+36.82
Democratic	Lowell Jackson	447	27.01%	−36.82

Missouri House of Representatives — District 40 — Monroe County (2012)
Party	Candidate	Votes	%	±%
Republican	Jim Hansen	1,080	36.17%	
Democratic	Paul Quinn	1,906	63.83%	

Monroe County is a part of Missouri's 10th District in the Missouri Senate and is currently represented by Jeanie Riddle (R-Fulton).

Missouri Senate — District 10 — Monroe County (2014)
Party	Candidate	Votes	%	±%
Republican	Jeanie Riddle	1,599	71.55%	
Democratic	Ed Schieffer	620	28.45%	

=== Federal ===
U.S. Senate — Missouri — Monroe County (2016)
Party	Candidate	Votes	%	±%
Republican	Roy Blunt	2,584	62.89%	+15.00
Democratic	Jason Kander	1,330	32.39%	−14.77
Libertarian	Jonathan Dine	105	2.55%	−2.40
Green	Johnathan McFarland	48	1.69%	+1.69
Constitution	Fred Ryman	42	1.02%	+1.02

U.S. Senate — Missouri — Monroe County (2012)
Party	Candidate	Votes	%	±%
Republican	Todd Akin	1,917	47.89%	
Democratic	Claire McCaskill	1,888	47.16%	
Libertarian	Jonathan Dine	198	4.95%	

Monroe County is included in Missouri's 6th congressional district and is currently represented by Sam Graves (R-Tarkio) in the U.S. House of Representatives.

U.S. House of Representatives — Missouri's 6th Congressional District — Monroe County (2016)
Party	Candidate	Votes	%	±%
Republican	Sam Graves	2,955	74.15%	+0.82
Democratic	David M. Blackwell	899	22.56%	−1.81
Libertarian	Russ Lee Monchil	94	2.36%	+0.06
Green	Mike Diel	37	0.93%	+0.93

U.S. House of Representatives — Missouri’s 6th Congressional District — Monroe County (2014)
Party	Candidate	Votes	%	±%
Republican	Sam Graves	1,592	73.33%	+10.41
Democratic	Bill Hedge	529	24.37%	−10.38
Libertarian	Russ Lee Monchil	50	2.30%	+0.02

U.S. House of Representatives — Missouri's 6th Congressional District — Monroe County (2012)
Party	Candidate	Votes	%	±%
Republican	Sam Graves	2,410	62.92%	
Democratic	Kyle Yarber	1,331	34.75%	
Libertarian	Russ Lee Monchil	89	2.32%	

=== Political culture ===
United States presidential election results for Monroe County, Missouri
Year	Republican		Democratic		Third party(ies)	
Year	No.	%	No.	%	No.	%
1888	983	20.09%	3,873	79.15%	37	0.76%
1892	787	16.57%	3,863	81.33%	100	2.11%
1896	892	16.85%	4,379	82.72%	23	0.43%
1900	795	16.30%	4,016	82.35%	66	1.35%
1904	790	18.17%	3,487	80.18%	72	1.66%
1908	871	18.61%	3,772	80.58%	38	0.81%
1912	583	13.04%	3,586	80.22%	301	6.73%
1916	742	16.20%	3,738	81.60%	101	2.20%
1920	1,406	18.42%	6,136	80.37%	93	1.22%
1924	1,141	16.51%	5,597	81.00%	172	2.49%
1928	1,378	21.69%	4,957	78.01%	19	0.30%
1932	714	10.25%	6,210	89.12%	44	0.63%
1936	939	12.79%	6,376	86.87%	25	0.34%
1940	1,200	16.60%	6,018	83.23%	13	0.18%
1944	1,098	17.98%	5,000	81.89%	8	0.13%
1948	809	14.49%	4,769	85.39%	7	0.13%
1952	1,488	23.77%	4,760	76.05%	11	0.18%
1956	1,331	23.18%	4,412	76.82%	0	0.00%
1960	1,519	27.47%	4,011	72.53%	0	0.00%
1964	928	18.45%	4,103	81.55%	0	0.00%
1968	1,349	29.07%	2,776	59.81%	516	11.12%
1972	2,141	48.22%	2,299	51.78%	0	0.00%
1976	1,585	34.09%	3,039	65.35%	26	0.56%
1980	2,026	44.48%	2,445	53.68%	84	1.84%
1984	2,163	52.06%	1,992	47.94%	0	0.00%
1988	1,542	38.42%	2,461	61.31%	11	0.27%
1992	1,153	27.54%	2,060	49.20%	974	23.26%
1996	1,333	34.80%	1,938	50.59%	560	14.62%
2000	2,175	53.13%	1,860	45.43%	59	1.44%
2004	2,632	61.11%	1,647	38.24%	28	0.65%
2008	2,533	58.72%	1,703	39.48%	78	1.81%
2012	2,564	63.20%	1,398	34.46%	95	2.34%
2016	3,159	76.01%	853	20.52%	144	3.46%
2020	3,477	77.56%	936	20.88%	70	1.56%
2024	3,476	79.40%	857	19.58%	45	1.03%

During the 19th century and most of the 20th century Democrats controlled Monroe County. The county was one of only two jurisdictions in Missouri to be carried by Democrat George McGovern in the 1972 presidential election against incumbent Republican President Richard Nixon, the other being the city of St. Louis. Monroe County was first carried by a Republican in 1976 by John Danforth in the U.S. Senate race. In 1984, Ronald Reagan became the first Republican candidate for president to win the county. Since 2000, the county has voted Republican in federal and state elections, and now Republicans control two-thirds of elected county positions. The last Democratic candidate to crack 40% of the county's vote was Al Gore in 2000. Barack Obama received just under 40% of the vote in 2008 and around 34% in 2012. Donald Trump became the first Republican to carry over 70% of the county's vote, which he did in all three of his runs in 2016, 2020, and 2024.

=== Missouri presidential preference primary (2016) ===
In the April 2016 presidential primary, Republicans out voted Democrats more than 3-to-1, 1,600 votes in the GOP primary compared to 495 in the Democrat. In 2016's August primary, Republicans outvoted Democrats 895 to 698.

== Education ==
=== Public schools ===
- Holliday C-2 School District – Holliday
  - Holliday Elementary School (K-08)
- Madison C-3 School District – Madison
  - Madison Elementary School (PK-06)
  - Madison High School (07-12)
- Middle Grove C-1 School District – Madison
  - Middle Grove Elementary School (K-08)
- Monroe City R-I School District – Monroe City
  - Monroe City Elementary School (PK-04)
  - Monroe City Middle School (05-08)
  - Monroe City High School (09-12)
- Paris R-II School District – Paris
  - Paris Elementary School (PK-06)
  - Paris Junior High School (07-08)
  - Paris High School (09-12)

=== Private schools ===
- Holy Rosary School – Monroe City (K-09) – Roman Catholic
- Foundation for Life Christian School – Paris (PK-12) – Nondenominational Christian

=== Public libraries ===
- Monroe City Public Library

== Communities ==
=== Cities and Towns ===
- Florida
- Holliday
- Madison
- Monroe City (partly in Marion County and a small part in Ralls County)
- Paris (county seat)
- Stoutsville

=== Census-designated place ===
- Middle Grove

=== Unincorporated communities ===
- Ash
- Clapper
- Evansville
- Granville
- Indian Creek
- North Fork
- Santa Fe
- Strother
- Tulip
- Woodlawn

== Notable people ==
- Mark Twain, American author and humorist, was born in Monroe County. The Mark Twain Birthplace State Historic Site in Mark Twain State Park commemorates this occasion.
- Xenophon Overton Pindall, member of the Arkansas House of Representatives, Arkansas State Senate and Acting Governor of the U.S. state of Arkansas
- Eli C. D. Shortridge, third governor of North Dakota from 1893 to 1895' raised in Monroe County.

== See also ==
- National Register of Historic Places listings in Monroe County, Missouri
