= Woodworth, Louisiana =

Woodworth
- Town
- Location of Woodworth in Rapides Parish, Louisiana.

- Location of Louisiana in the United States
- Coordinates: 31°09′50″N 92°30′09″W
- Country: United States
- State: Louisiana
- Parish: Rapides

Area
  - Total: 8.89 sq mi (23.02 km^{2})
  - Land: 8.88 sq mi (23.01 km^{2})
  - Water: 0.0039 sq mi (0.01 km^{2})
- Elevation: 102 ft (31 m)

Population (2020)
  - Total: 1,762
  - Density: 198.3/sq mi (76.58/km^{2})
- Time zone: UTC-6 (CST)
  - Summer (DST): UTC-5 (CDT)
- ZIP code: 71485
- Area code: 318
- FIPS code: 22-83125
- GNIS feature ID: 2406916
- Website: townofwoodworth.com

Woodworth is a town in Rapides Parish, Louisiana, United States. It is part of the Alexandria, Louisiana Metropolitan Statistical Area. As of the 2020 census, Woodworth had a population of 1,762.

== History ==
Woodworth was established in 1942 under the Lawrason Act.

The town began with a small population in the 1880s with the first significant resident being George Hendricks from Arkansas who allegedly built a rice farm in the village, but later found himself unsuccessful and left.

The town's growth did not yet stop, as a businessman named John McEnery came from New Orleans and brought his railroad company (New Orleans Pacific Railroad) with him. McEnery did not have this land for long however as he later sold it, and on November 25, 1890, the 18,000 acres of land were sold to three people: C. E. Roberts, C. S. Woodworth, and Ed Rand all of whom were from neighboring state of Texas. The three men had yet to explore this land but established the Rapides Lumber Company in the village, constructing a sawmill. The name of this town originates from C. S. Woodworth’s name of whom the company decided the community should be named after.`

Soon after the sawmill was constructed, a Missouri located company bought out positions of the lumber company being those held by C. S. Woodworth and C. E. Roberts, but Rand kept his position. Because of these transfers, the company was renamed to the Long-Bell Lumber Company of Woodworth. By the early 1900s, the town of Woodworth had reached a population of roughly 1,000, while continuous expansion of the town's businesses and services began, which oversaw the construction of churches and commercial businesses in the town. As this happened, the first Catholic Church was constructed in Woodworth after Bishop Van de Ven blessed a chapel in the town. The land where this chapel was had later been owned by Richard and Edward Butler, which then was passed over to Henry Butler on November 19, 1908. On June 15, 1911, the 2-acre land was finally inherited by Bishop Van de Ven.

As this church continued to grow, so did the population. The Catholic Church invited the large Catholic population of Rapides Parish towards Woodworth after the exponential growth of the sawmill. This also attracted a certain Catholic family, the Moore family, which was a family consisting of a former slave and the descendants of the freed slave. Alvah Joseph Moore moved to the town in the early 1900's, and was a prominent saw mill operator and musician who played in the Woodworth Band. Moore and his family wrote recollections of the era in Woodworth and their life in the town. During the period of Catholic migration to the town, the Ku Klux Klan also rose to prominence in the town, as conflicts between the two groups began arising in the town, which eventually was put to a stop after the sawmill company intervened.

After the conflicts between the Catholics and Ku Klux Klan ended, the sawmill eventually began seeing less and less production in the region and eventually moved out in 1926, leaving the land barren until restoration during the Civilian Conservation Corps program. The Catholic church was relocated to Reddell, Louisiana which signaled the loss of many Catholic residents of the town.

Following the closure of the sawmill, and the relocation of several Catholic residents, the town seemed to stop growing until the war era. As of now, Catholic residents were attending St. Martin's Church in Lecompte, Louisiana Following the closure of the church, Father Gerard J. Ducote, the second pastor of Cabrini, sent a letter to Bishop Charles P. Greco saying: "I understand from Mr. and Mrs. A.J. Moore that there have been no Catholic services in Woodworth since about 1927, the year in which they left the community to reside in Alexandria, and that the reason why so many of these people have not continued active affiliation with the Church was because of resentment that their Church had been dismantled and moved away - a measure of protest over the action." The Catholic Churches were then promised double attendance, which was reached but mainly as result of the heavy growth of Camp Claiborne inhabitants.

Camp Claiborne was also formed in Louisiana and rose to higher prominence during World War II, where over half a million men circulated through the camp. The camp oversaw the Louisiana Maneuvers training which was led by many prominent military and later political members including General Omar Bradley, General Ben Lear, and Walter Krueger, just to name a few. Eventually, this camp was then used for German military POWs. After the war, the camp was acquired by the United States Forest Service. The United States Army Corps of Engineers also has jurisdiction there regarding unexploded ordnance

== Geography ==
According to the United States Census Bureau, the town has a total area of 4.9 square miles (13 km^{2}), of which 4.9 square miles (12.7 km^{2}) is land and 0.20% is water.

=== Major highways ===
- U.S. Route 165
- LA 3265
- Interstate 49

=== Climate ===
This climatic region is typified by relatively small seasonal temperature differences, with warm to hot (and often humid) summers and mild winters. According to the Köppen Climate Classification system, Woodworth has a humid subtropical climate, abbreviated "Cfa" on climate maps.

Climate data for Woodworth, Louisiana
Month	Jan	Feb	Mar	Apr	May	Jun	Jul	Aug	Sep	Oct	Nov	Dec	Year
Mean daily maximum °C (°F)	14 (58)	17 (63)	22 (71)	26 (78)	29 (84)	32 (90)	34 (93)	34 (93)	31 (88)	26 (79)	21 (69)	16 (61)	25 (77)
Mean daily minimum °C (°F)	3 (37)	4 (40)	9 (48)	12 (54)	17 (62)	21 (69)	22 (71)	21 (70)	18 (65)	12 (54)	7 (45)	3 (38)	12 (54)
Average precipitation mm (inches)	150 (6.1)	130 (5.1)	130 (5.1)	130 (5.1)	130 (5.2)	130 (5)	130 (5.2)	100 (4.1)	100 (4.1)	100 (4)	160 (6.3)	170 (6.5)	1,570 (61.7)
Source: Weatherbase

== Demographics ==
Historical population
Census	Pop.	Note	%±
1950	392		—
1960	320		−18.4%
1970	409		27.8%
1980	412		0.7%
1990	754		83.0%
2000	1,080		43.2%
2010	1,096		1.5%
2020	1,762		60.8%
2025 (est.)	1,758	▼	−0.2%
U.S. Decennial Census

=== 2020 census ===
As of the 2020 census, Woodworth had a population of 1,762. The median age was 40.1 years. 26.7% of residents were under the age of 18 and 16.4% were 65 years of age or older. For every 100 females, there were 93.0 males, and for every 100 females age 18 and over, there were 89.9 males age 18 and over.

0.0% of residents lived in urban areas, while 100.0% lived in rural areas.

There were 680 households in the town, including 435 families. Of all households, 35.9% had children under the age of 18 living in them. Of all households, 54.7% were married-couple households, 14.4% were households with a male householder and no spouse or partner present, and 26.9% were households with a female householder and no spouse or partner present. About 25.0% of all households were made up of individuals, and 13.0% had someone living alone who was 65 years of age or older.

There were 725 housing units, of which 6.2% were vacant. The homeowner vacancy rate was 1.5% and the rental vacancy rate was 0.7%.

Woodworth racial composition
Race	Number	Percentage
White (non-Hispanic)	1,474	83.65%
Black or African American (non-Hispanic)	142	8.06%
Native American	18	1.02%
Asian	11	0.62%
Pacific Islander	1	0.06%
Other/Mixed	69	3.92%
Hispanic or Latino	47	2.67%

=== 2000 census ===
As of the census of 2000, there were 1,080 people, 385 households, and 299 families residing in the town. The population density was 219.5 inhabitants per square mile (84.7/km^{2}). There were 408 housing units at an average density of 82.9 per square mile (32.0/km^{2}). The racial makeup of the town was 87.96% White, 10.46% African American, 0.46% Native American, 0.28% from other races, and 0.83% from two or more races. Hispanic or Latino of any race were 2.13% of the population.

There were 385 households, out of which 45.7% had children under the age of 18 living with them, 63.1% were married couples living together, 11.7% had a female householder with no husband present, and 22.1% were non-families. 18.2% of all households were made up of individuals, and 4.2% had someone living alone who was 65 years of age or older. The average household size was 2.81 and the average family size was 3.22.

In the town, the population was spread out, with 29.8% under the age of 18, 10.7% from 18 to 24, 32.1% from 25 to 44, 19.6% from 45 to 64, and 7.7% who were 65 years of age or older. The median age was 33 years. For every 100 females, there were 101.5 males. For every 100 females age 18 and over, there were 94.4 males.

The median income for a household in the town was $37,262, and the median income for a family was $41,667. Males had a median income of $30,417 versus $23,587 for females. The per capita income for the town was $16,200. About 6.8% of families and 9.8% of the population were below the poverty line, including 9.7% of those under age 18 and 9.4% of those age 65 or over.

== Education ==
=== Caroline Dormon Junior High ===
In August 2012, Caroline Dormon Junior High School was completed and ready for the new school year. Sitting on a 33-acre site off U.S. Route 165, the $6.5 million project is the first "green" school for the CenLa area as well as the first school within Woodworth city limits. The 50,000 sq ft building currently holds about 400 students. The school hold classes from kindergarten to 8th grade. In the 2022–2023 school year, the school district proposed a bond to expand the school due to its high over-enrollment. The school was built to house around 150 students, but in 2022, reached a peak of 400 students. Caroline Dormon Junior High was the top A traditional public school in Rapides Parish, Louisiana from 2012 to now, and is only being outperformed by Phoenix Magnet Elementary School in a non-traditional category, as Phoenix is a magnet school.

== Court ==
Woodworth is among 250 towns and villages in Louisiana with a Mayors court as provided by R.S. 33:44l and 442.

=== History ===
A mayor's court was authorized through municipal charters, and an act of 1772, giving a mayor the jurisdiction of a justice of the peace as to petty causes. Louisiana and Ohio have this form of court system.

=== Controversy ===
There has been controversy on the town being considered as a speed trap and the fact that the mayor has a conflict of interest also filling the Judiciary position. A suit was filed in one case ultimately resulting in the plaintiff being vindicated by a Louisiana appeals court.
