= Linn Township, Audrain County, Missouri =

Township in Missouri, United States

Linn Township
- Township
- Coordinates: 39°12′26″N 091°43′28″W
- Country: United States
- State: Missouri
- County: Audrain

Area
  - Total: 75.71 sq mi (196.08 km^{2})
  - Land: 75.27 sq mi (194.94 km^{2})
  - Water: 0.44 sq mi (1.13 km^{2}) 0.58%
- Elevation: 790 ft (240 m)

Population (2010)
  - Total: 615
  - Density: 8.3/sq mi (3.2/km^{2})
- FIPS code: 29-43148
- GNIS feature ID: 0766242

Linn Township is one of eight townships in Audrain County, Missouri, United States. As of the 2010 census, its population was 615.

The origin of the name Linn Township is disputed.

== Geography ==
Linn Township covers an area of 75.7 square miles (196.1 km^{2}) and contains one incorporated settlement, Rush Hill. It contains one cemetery, New Providence.

The streams of Bean Branch, Johns Branch and Mams Slough run through this township.
