= Wilson Township, Audrain County, Missouri =

Township in Missouri, United States

Wilson Township
- Township
- Coordinates: 39°11′22″N 092°01′57″W
- Country: United States
- State: Missouri
- County: Audrain

Area
  - Total: 136.71 sq mi (354.09 km^{2})
  - Land: 135.93 sq mi (352.07 km^{2})
  - Water: 0.78 sq mi (2.03 km^{2}) 0.57%
- Elevation: 820 ft (250 m)

Population (2010)
  - Total: 1,633
  - Density: 12/sq mi (4.6/km^{2})
- FIPS code: 29-80152
- GNIS feature ID: 0766248

Wilson Township is one of eight townships in Audrain County, Missouri, United States. As of the 2010 census, its population was 1,633.

== History ==
Wilson Township was established in 1837. The township has the name of Daniel Wilson, a pioneer settler.

== Geography ==
Wilson Township covers an area of 136.7 square miles (354.1 km^{2}) and contains no incorporated settlements. It contains one cemetery, Skull Lick.

The streams of Big Branch, Goodwater Creek, Hitt Branch, Mayes Branch and Possum Walk Creek run through this township.
