= Loutre Township, Audrain County, Missouri =

Township in Missouri, United States

Loutre Township
- Township
- Coordinates: 39°07′06″N 091°41′48″W
- Country: United States
- State: Missouri
- County: Audrain

Area
  - Total: 56.20 sq mi (145.57 km^{2})
  - Land: 55.88 sq mi (144.73 km^{2})
  - Water: 0.32 sq mi (0.84 km^{2}) 0.58%
- Elevation: 814 ft (248 m)

Population (2010)
  - Total: 824
  - Density: 15/sq mi (5.7/km^{2})
- FIPS code: 29-44210
- GNIS feature ID: 0766243

Loutre Township is one of eight townships in Audrain County, Missouri, United States. As of the 2010 census, its population was 824.

Loutre Township was established in 1837, and was named after a creek of the same name within its borders.

== Geography ==
Loutre Township covers an area of 56.2 square miles (145.6 km^{2}) and contains two incorporated settlements: Benton City and Martinsburg. It contains two cemeteries: Martinsburg and Unity.
