= South Fork Township, Audrain County, Missouri =

Township in Missouri, United States

South Fork Township
- Township
- Coordinates: 39°10′11″N 091°51′40″W
- Country: United States
- State: Missouri
- County: Audrain

Area
  - Total: 46.34 sq mi (120.03 km^{2})
  - Land: 45.48 sq mi (117.78 km^{2})
  - Water: 0.87 sq mi (2.25 km^{2}) 1.87%
- Elevation: 751 ft (229 m)

Population (2010)
  - Total: 5,431
  - Density: 119/sq mi (46.1/km^{2})
- FIPS code: 29-68744
- GNIS feature ID: 0766247

South Fork Township is one of eight townships in Audrain County, Missouri, United States. As of the 2010 census, its population was 5,431. In reference to the 2020 decennial census, the population of the Township was 5,383 with the median age being 39.5.

== Geography ==
South Fork Township covers an area of 46.3 square miles (120.0 km^{2}) and contains one incorporated settlement, Vandiver. It contains three cemeteries: East Lawn Memorial, Lockridge and New Hope.

Blackmore Lake, Teal Lake and Timber Lake are within this township. The streams of Beaverdam Creek, Davis Creek, Elm Branch, Long Branch, Scattering Fork and Youngs Creek run through this township.

== Transportation ==
South Fork Township contains one airport or landing strip, Mexico Memorial Airport.
