= Goodwater Creek =

Stream in the American state of Missouri

Goodwater Creek is a stream in Audrain and Boone counties in the U.S. state of Missouri. It is a tributary of Youngs Creek.

The stream headwaters arise in northeast Boone County southwest of Centralia at 39°11′44″N 92°09′02″W and it flows north past Centralia passing under routes 124 and 22 to enter northwest Audrain County. The stream turns to the east two miles east of the community of Saling. The confluence is approximately two miles southeast of the community of Rowena at 39°18′17″N 92°01′31″W.

Goodwater Creek was so named on account of the quality of its water.

== See also ==
- List of rivers of Missouri
