= Prairie Township, Audrain County, Missouri =

Township in Missouri, United States

Prairie Township
- Township
- Coordinates: 39°15′44″N 091°41′41″W
- Country: United States
- State: Missouri
- County: Audrain

Area
  - Total: 79.02 sq mi (204.65 km^{2})
  - Land: 78.69 sq mi (203.80 km^{2})
  - Water: 0.33 sq mi (0.85 km^{2}) 0.42%
- Elevation: 774 ft (236 m)

Population (2010)
  - Total: 932
  - Density: 12/sq mi (4.6/km^{2})
- FIPS code: 29-59474
- GNIS feature ID: 0766244

Prairie Township is one of eight townships in Audrain County, Missouri, United States. As of the 2010 census, its population was 932.

== History ==
Prairie Township was established in 1837. The township was named for prairie landscape within its borders.

== Geography ==
Prairie Township covers an area of 79.0 square miles (204.6 km^{2}) and contains one incorporated settlement, Laddonia. It contains three cemeteries: Bean Creek, Eubank and Unity.

The streams of Bean Creek, Hazel Creek, Littleby Creek, Sandy Creek, Talleys Branch, Tattys Creek and Wildcat Creek run through this township.

== Transportation ==
Prairie Township contains one airport or landing strip, Schlemmer Airport.
