= Johns Branch =

Johns Branch may refer to:

- Johns Branch (Sandy Creek), a stream in Missouri
- Johns Branch (West Fork Cuivre River), a stream in Missouri
