= Steve Wieberg =

American former college sports reporter (born c. 1955)

Steve Wieberg (born c. 1955) is an American former college sports reporter who had a 30-year career with USA Today (1982–2012). He is a writer and editor in the public affairs department of the Kansas City Public Library.

== Career ==
A former resident of Martinsburg, Missouri, Wieberg is a graduate of Community R-VI High School in Laddonia, Missouri. He graduated from the University of Missouri in 1976. Wieberg first worked as a sports reporter at two Missouri newspapers, The Mexico Ledger and the Springfield News-Leader. He then joined the founding staff at USA Today, where he spent 30 years, working first in Washington, D.C., then relocating back to Missouri.

Wieberg was inducted into the United States Basketball Writers Association Hall of Fame in 2008. He was a member of the initial College Football Playoff selection committee, serving from 2014 to 2018. He received the Bert McGrane Award from the Football Writers Association of America in 2018.

Wieberg and his wife lived for 28 years in Lawson, Missouri, where they raised three children. The couple later moved to Liberty, Missouri.
