= Saling Township, Audrain County, Missouri =

Township in Missouri, United States

Saling Township
- Township
- Coordinates: 39°17′03″N 092°10′11″W
- Country: United States
- State: Missouri
- County: Audrain

Area
  - Total: 78.58 sq mi (203.51 km^{2})
  - Land: 78.35 sq mi (202.92 km^{2})
  - Water: 0.23 sq mi (0.59 km^{2}) 0.29%
- Elevation: 843 ft (257 m)

Population (2010)
  - Total: 1,472
  - Density: 19/sq mi (7.3/km^{2})
- FIPS code: 29-65432
- GNIS feature ID: 0766245

Saling Township is one of eight townships in Audrain County, Missouri, United States. As of the 2010 census, its population was 1,472.

== History ==
Saling Township was organized in 1837, taking its name from Saling Creek.

== Geography ==
Saling Township covers an area of 78.6 square miles (203.5 km^{2}) and contains no incorporated settlements. It contains four cemeteries, Macedonia, Applemans Chapel, Pleasant Grove and Mount Pisgah.

Larrabee Lake is within this township. The streams of Big Creek and Boat Branch run through this township.
