= Possum Walk Creek (Mayes Branch tributary) =

Stream in the American state of Missouri

Coordinates: 39.180319°N 92.028509°W

Possum Walk Creek (also called Possum Branch) is a stream in Audrain County in the U.S. state of Missouri. It is a tributary of Mayes Branch.

Possum Walk Creek was named for the abundance of opossums along its course.

== See also ==
- List of rivers of Missouri
