= Cuivre Township =

Cuivre Township, Missouri may refer to the following townships in the State of Missouri:

- Cuivre Township, Audrain County, Missouri
- Cuivre Township, Pike County, Missouri
