= Skinner =

Skinner may refer to:

== People and fictional characters ==
- Skinner (surname), a list of people and fictional characters with that surname
- Skinner (profession), a person who makes a living by working with animal skins or driving mules
- Skinner, a ring name of professional wrestler Steve Keirn in early 1990s
- B. F. Skinner, American Psychologist

== American geography ==
- Skinner, Missouri, an unincorporated community
- Skinner Butte, a prominent hill beside the Willamette River in Oregon
- Skinner Reservoir, a reservoir in Riverside County, California

== Other uses ==
- Skinner (film), a 1993 horror film
- The Skinner, a 2002 science fiction novel by Neal Asher
- Skinner, Inc., also known as Skinner, an auction house for fine art and antiques
- The Colour Identification Guide to Moths of the British Isles, referred to as Skinner, by Bernard Skinner

== See also ==
- Skinners (disambiguation)
