= Saling Creek =

Stream in the U.S. state of Missouri

Saling Creek is a stream in Audrain, Boone and Monroe counties in the U.S. state of Missouri. It is a tributary of Reese Fork.

The stream headwaters arise in northern Boone County adjacent to the east side of U.S. Route 63 approximately 13 mi (21 km) southeast of Moberly at 39°13′39″N 92°19′26″W and an elevation of approximately 855 ft (261 m). The stream meanders 2.5 mi (4.0 km) to the east passing south of the town of Sturgeon and turning north through the east side of that community. The stream passes under Missouri Route 22 and into Audrain County just north of Sturgeon. The stream flows generally north through the west portion of Audrain County roughly parallel to and west of Missouri Route 151. The stream enters Monroe County and within just a few feet enters Reese Fork. The confluence is at 39°20′47″N 92°15′06″W and an elevation of 771 ft (235 m).

Saling Creek was named after George Saling, a pioneer settler.

== See also ==
- List of rivers of Missouri
