= Goodwater (disambiguation) =

Goodwater, Alabama is a town in the United States.

Goodwater or Good Water may also refer to:

- Goodwater, Saskatchewan
- Goodwater Creek, a stream in Missouri
- Good Water, Missouri
