= Saling =

Saling may refer to:

- Saling, Missouri - an unincorporated community in Audrain County, in the U.S. state of Missouri
- Saling, Pakistan - a village of Ghanche District, Pakistan
- Saling Gewog - a gewog (village block) of Mongar District, Bhutan
- Bardfield Saling - a village and in the Braintree district of the English county of Essex
- Great Saling - a village and in the Braintree district of the English county of Essex
- Jay Saling - the former bassist of Michigan heavy metal band Battlecross

== See also ==
- Sailing (disambiguation)
