= Cuivre Township, Audrain County, Missouri =

Township in Missouri, United States

Cuivre Township
- Township
- Coordinates: 39°17′48″N 091°30′10″W
- Country: United States
- State: Missouri
- County: Audrain

Area
  - Total: 112.56 sq mi (291.54 km^{2})
  - Land: 111.85 sq mi (289.70 km^{2})
  - Water: 0.71 sq mi (1.84 km^{2}) 0.63%
- Elevation: 764 ft (233 m)

Population (2010)
  - Total: 5,125
  - Density: 46/sq mi (17.7/km^{2})
- FIPS code: 29-17686
- GNIS feature ID: 0766241

Cuivre Township is one of eight townships in Audrain County, Missouri, United States. As of the 2010 census, its population was 5,125.

Cuivre Township takes its name from Cuivre Creek.

== Geography ==
Cuivre Township covers an area of 112.5 square miles (291.5 km^{2}) and contains two incorporated settlements: Farber and Vandalia. It contains five cemeteries: Edwards, Evergreen Memorial Gardens, Farber, Fike and Payne.

The streams of Bear Slough, Hickory Creek and Lost Creek run through this township.

== Transportation ==
Cuivre Township contained one airport or landing strip, Vandalia Airpark, which has since been plowed and used for farmland by the owner.
