= Skinners =

Skinners may refer to:

- Skinners' Academy, a secondary school in Woodberry Down, Hackney, London, England
- The Skinners' School, an all-boys grammar school in Royal Tunbridge Wells, Kent, England
- Skinners' Dairy, a family-run dairy in and around Jacksonville, Florida, from 1922 until 1995
- Skinners Family Hotel, a heritage-listed former pub and now retail optometrist shop in Sydney, New South Wales, Australia
- 39 (Skinners) Signal Regiment, an Army Reserve regiment of the British Army
- Skinners Gap, a mountain pass in West Virginia, United States

== See also ==
- Worshipful Company of Skinners, one of the Livery Companies of the City of London
- Skinner (disambiguation)
