= Youngs Creek (Long Branch tributary) =

Stream in the American state of Missouri

Coordinates: 39°20′34″N 91°50′52″W

Youngs Creek is a stream in Audrain, Boone and Monroe counties in the U.S. state of Missouri. It is a tributary of Long Branch.

Youngs Creek has the name of Benjamin Young, a pioneer settler.

== See also ==
- List of rivers of Missouri
