= Rush Hill, Missouri =

- Village
- Location of Rush Hill, Missouri
- Coordinates: 39°12′37″N 91°43′29″W
- Country: United States
- State: Missouri
- County: Audrain

Area
  - Total: 0.18 sq mi (0.47 km^{2})
  - Land: 0.18 sq mi (0.46 km^{2})
  - Water: 0 sq mi (0.00 km^{2})
- Elevation: 787 ft (240 m)

Population (2020)
  - Total: 103
  - Density: 573.8/sq mi (221.53/km^{2})
- Time zone: UTC-6 (Central (CST))
  - Summer (DST): UTC-5 (CDT)
- ZIP code: 65280
- Area code: 573
- FIPS code: 29-63560
- GNIS feature ID: 2399142

Rush Hill is a village in Audrain County, Missouri, United States. As of the 2020 census, Rush Hill had a population of 103.

== History ==
Rush Hill was platted in 1881. The village's name is an amalgamation of the surnames of its founders, Reusch and Hill. A post office has been in operation at Rush Hill since 1881.

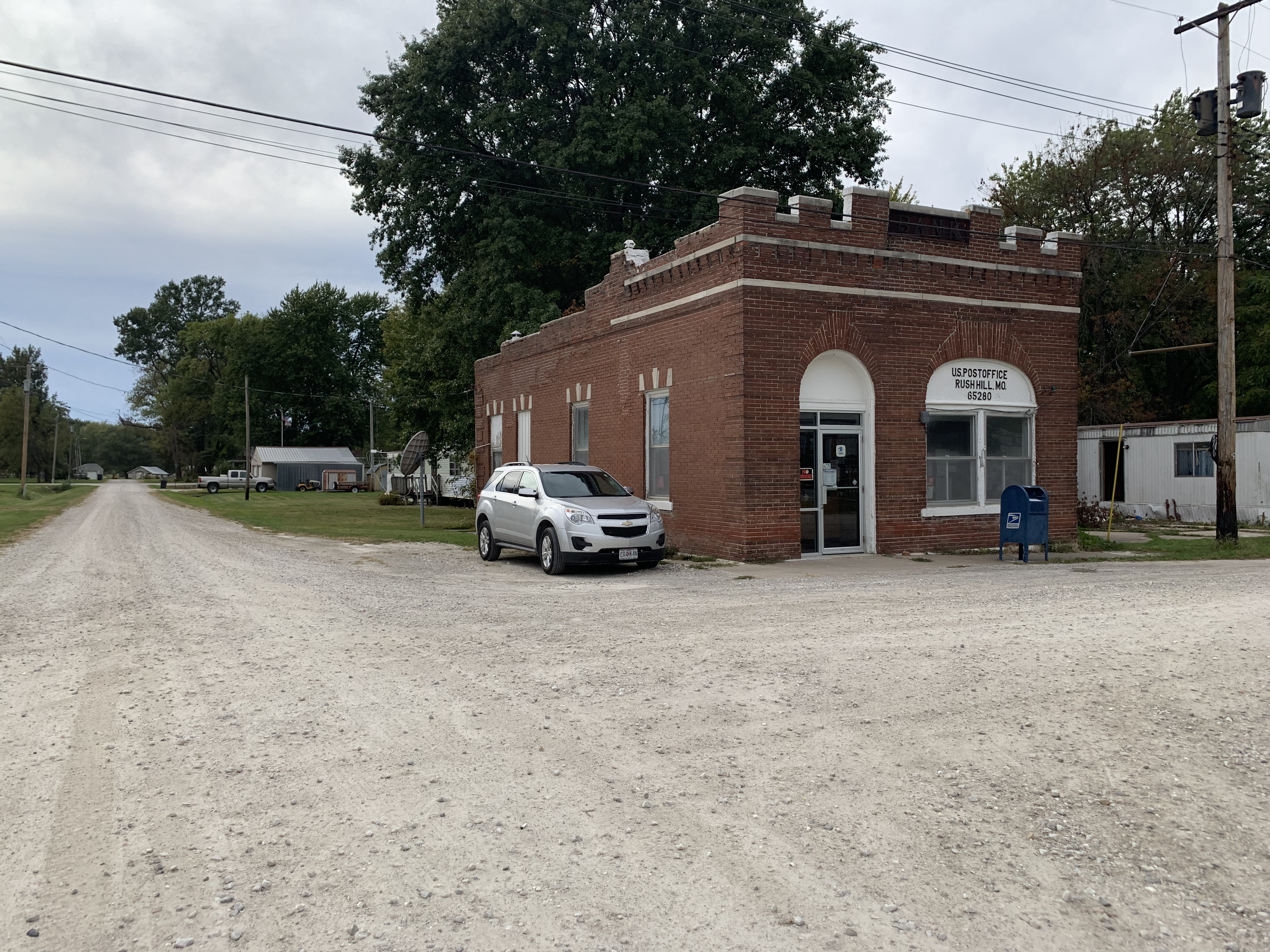
Post office in Rush Hill, Missouri, at corner of Third and Center streets.

== Geography ==
According to the United States Census Bureau, the village has a total area of 0.18 square miles (0.47 km^{2}), all land.

== Demographics ==
Historical population
Census	Pop.	Note	%±
1890	210		—
1900	181		−13.8%
1910	168		−7.2%
1920	146		−13.1%
1930	149		2.1%
1940	136		−8.7%
1950	127		−6.6%
1960	132		3.9%
1970	151		14.4%
1980	140		−7.3%
1990	121		−13.6%
2000	130		7.4%
2010	151		16.2%
2020	103		−31.8%
U.S. Decennial Census

=== 2010 census ===
As of the census of 2010, there were 151 people, 60 households, and 39 families residing in the village. The population density was 838.9 inhabitants per square mile (323.9/km^{2}). There were 69 housing units at an average density of 383.3 per square mile (148.0/km^{2}). The racial makeup of the village was 96.0% White and 4.0% from two or more races. Hispanic or Latino of any race were 4.0% of the population.

There were 60 households, of which 31.7% had children under the age of 18 living with them, 48.3% were married couples living together, 10.0% had a female householder with no husband present, 6.7% had a male householder with no wife present, and 35.0% were non-families. 31.7% of all households were made up of individuals, and 6.6% had someone living alone who was 65 years of age or older. The average household size was 2.52 and the average family size was 3.10.

The median age in the village was 33.3 years. 35.1% of residents were under the age of 18; 4.7% were between the ages of 18 and 24; 21.3% were from 25 to 44; 27.8% were from 45 to 64; and 11.3% were 65 years of age or older. The gender makeup of the village was 51.7% male and 48.3% female.

=== 2000 census ===
As of the census of 2000, there were 130 people, 53 households, and 40 families residing in the village. The population density was 737.8 inhabitants per square mile (284.9/km^{2}). There were 60 housing units at an average density of 340.5 per square mile (131.5/km^{2}). The racial makeup of the village was 100% White.

There were 53 households, out of which 34.0% had children under the age of 18 living with them, 60.4% were married couples living together, 7.5% had a female householder with no husband present, and 24.5% were non-families. 20.8% of all households were made up of individuals, and 13.2% had someone living alone who was 65 years of age or older. The average household size was 2.45 and the average family size was 2.80.

In the village, the population was spread out, with 27.7% under the age of 18, 5.4% from 18 to 24, 23.8% from 25 to 44, 23.1% from 45 to 64, and 20.0% who were 65 years of age or older. The median age was 40 years. For every 100 females, there were 113.1 males. For every 100 females age 18 and over, there were 91.8 males.

The median income for a household in the village was $26,250, and the median income for a family was $33,750. Males had a median income of $33,333 versus $21,250 for females. The per capita income for the village was $14,523. There were 5.0% of families and 11.5% of the population living below the poverty line, including 28.0% of under eighteens and 6.9% of those over 64.
