= Mexico Public Schools =

School district in Missouri, U.S.

Mexico Public Schools #59 is a public school system serving Mexico, Missouri, United States. Students in the district are eligible to attend the Davis H. Hart Career Center.

== Schools ==
=== Secondary schools ===
- Mexico Senior High School
- Mexico Middle School

=== Elementary schools ===
- Eugene Field Elementary School
- Hawthorne Elementary School

=== Early childhood schools ===
- McMillan Early Learning Center

=== Alternative school ===
- Mexico Education Center
