= Worcester, Missouri =

Unincorporated community in Missouri, United States

Coordinates: 39°16′25″N 91°45′15″W

Worcester is an unincorporated community in Audrain County, in the U.S. state of Missouri.

== History ==
A post office called Worcester was established in 1877, and remained in operation until 1907. The community was named after Worcester, Massachusetts, the native home of a share of the first settlers.
