= Sandy Creek (Cuivre River tributary) =

Stream in the U.S. state of Missouri

Coordinates: 39.128375°N 91.386266°W

Sandy Creek is a stream in Audrain, Montgomery and Pike counties in the U.S. state of Missouri. It is a tributary of the Cuivre River.

Sandy Creek was named for the sandy character of its course.

== See also ==
- List of rivers of Missouri
