= Farber, Missouri =

- City
- City of Farber
- Farber Railway Depot

- Location of Farber, Missouri
- Coordinates: 39°16′29″N 91°34′34″W
- Country: United States
- State: Missouri
- County: Audrain

Area
  - Total: 0.29 sq mi (0.74 km^{2})
  - Land: 0.29 sq mi (0.74 km^{2})
  - Water: 0 sq mi (0.00 km^{2})
- Elevation: 768 ft (234 m)

Population (2020)
  - Total: 255
  - Density: 890.8/sq mi (343.93/km^{2})
- Time zone: UTC-6 (Central (CST))
  - Summer (DST): UTC-5 (CDT)
- ZIP code: 63345
- Area code: 573
- FIPS code: 29-23662
- GNIS feature ID: 2394741

Farber is a city in Audrain County, Missouri, United States. As of the 2020 census, Farber had a population of 255.

== History ==
Farber was platted in 1872. The community was named for Silas W. Farber, owner of the land upon which the village now stands. A post office has been in operation at Farber since 1872.

== Geography ==
According to the United States Census Bureau, the city has a total area of 0.28 square miles (0.73 km^{2}), all land.

== Demographics ==
Historical population
Census	Pop.	Note	%±
1880	117		—
1890	272		132.5%
1900	247		−9.2%
1910	305		23.5%
1920	363		19.0%
1930	436		20.1%
1940	386		−11.5%
1950	358		−7.3%
1960	451		26.0%
1970	470		4.2%
1980	503		7.0%
1990	418		−16.9%
2000	411		−1.7%
2010	322		−21.7%
2020	255		−20.8%
U.S. Decennial Census

=== 2010 census ===
As of the census of 2010, there were 322 people, 150 households, and 83 families residing in the city. The population density was 1,150.0 inhabitants per square mile (444.0/km^{2}). There were 164 housing units at an average density of 585.7 per square mile (226.1/km^{2}). The racial makeup of the city was 92.9% White, 1.6% African American, 0.6% Native American, 0.3% from other races, and 4.7% from two or more races. Hispanic or Latino of any race were 0.6% of the population.

There were 150 households, of which 28.0% had children under the age of 18 living with them, 34.0% were married couples living together, 14.0% had a female householder with no husband present, 7.3% had a male householder with no wife present, and 44.7% were non-families. 38.7% of all households were made up of individuals, and 13.4% had someone living alone who was 65 years of age or older. The average household size was 2.15 and the average family size was 2.84.

The median age in the city was 42.2 years. 22.4% of residents were under the age of 18; 7.8% were between the ages of 18 and 24; 22.1% were from 25 to 44; 29.2% were from 45 to 64; and 18.6% were 65 years of age or older. The gender makeup of the city was 49.4% male and 50.6% female.

=== 2000 census ===
As of the census of 2000, there were 411 people, 170 households, and 120 families residing in the city. The population density was 1,444.3 inhabitants per square mile (557.6/km^{2}). There were 198 housing units at an average density of 695.8 per square mile (268.6/km^{2}). The racial makeup of the city was 98.54% White, 0.49% Native American, 0.24% Asian, and 0.73% from two or more races.

There were 170 households, out of which 29.4% had children under the age of 18 living with them, 56.5% were married couples living together, 9.4% had a female householder with no husband present, and 29.4% were non-families. 24.7% of all households were made up of individuals, and 11.2% had someone living alone who was 65 years of age or older. The average household size was 2.42 and the average family size was 2.85.

In the city, the population was spread out, with 23.6% under the age of 18, 9.5% from 18 to 24, 23.6% from 25 to 44, 27.3% from 45 to 64, and 16.1% who were 65 years of age or older. The median age was 40 years. For every 100 females, there were 102.5 males. For every 100 females age 18 and over, there were 93.8 males.

The median income for a household in the city was $36,250, and the median income for a family was $40,481. Males had a median income of $30,962 versus $19,875 for females. The per capita income for the city was $16,622. About 9.1% of families and 10.6% of the population were below the poverty line, including 14.4% of those under age 18 and 4.9% of those age 65 or over.

== Education ==
Farber has a lending library, a branch of the Mexico-Audrain Library District.
