= Molino, Missouri =

Unincorporated community in Missouri, United States

Coordinates: 39°18′06″N 91°52′42″W

Molino is an unincorporated community in Audrain County, in the U.S. state of Missouri.

== History ==
A post office called Molino was established in 1882, and remained in operation until 1957. The community's name commemorates the Battle of Molino del Rey.
