= Mams Slough =

Stream in the American state of Missouri

Coordinates: 39.1964287°N 91.6582177°W

Mams Slough is a stream in Audrain County in the U.S. state of Missouri.

According to folk etymology, the creek was named for the fact a "mam slew" (i.e. a woman hunted) near its banks.

== See also ==
- List of rivers of Missouri
