= Johns Branch (Sandy Creek tributary) =

Stream in the American state of Missouri

Coordinates: 39.1455971°N 91.3918214°W

Johns Branch is a stream in Pike County in the U.S. state of Missouri. It is a tributary of Sandy Creek.

Johns Branch has the name of John Brown, the original owner of the site.

== See also ==
- List of rivers of Missouri
