= Vandiver, Missouri =

- Village
- Location of Vandiver, Missouri
- Coordinates: 39°09′44″N 91°50′50″W
- Country: United States
- State: Missouri
- County: Audrain
- Incorporated: 1956

Area
  - Total: 0.32 sq mi (0.82 km^{2})
  - Land: 0.31 sq mi (0.81 km^{2})
  - Water: 0.0039 sq mi (0.01 km^{2})
- Elevation: 814 ft (248 m)

Population (2020)
  - Total: 63
  - Density: 202.1/sq mi (78.02/km^{2})
- Time zone: UTC-6 (Central (CST))
  - Summer (DST): UTC-5 (CDT)
- FIPS code: 29-75706
- GNIS feature ID: 2400046

Vandiver is a village in Audrain County, Missouri, United States. As of the 2020 census, the village population was 63.

== Geography ==
According to the United States Census Bureau, the village has a total area of 0.30 square miles (0.78 km^{2}), all land.

== Demographics ==
Historical population
Census	Pop.	Note	%±
1960	45		—
1970	102		126.7%
1980	88		−13.7%
1990	75		−14.8%
2000	83		10.7%
2010	71		−14.5%
2020	63		−11.3%
U.S. Decennial Census

=== 2010 census ===
As of the census of 2010, there were 71 people, 29 households, and 23 families living in the village. The population density was 236.7 inhabitants per square mile (91.4/km^{2}). There were 33 housing units at an average density of 110.0 per square mile (42.5/km^{2}). The racial makeup of the village was 100.0% White.

There were 29 households, of which 20.7% had children under the age of 18 living with them, 69.0% were married couples living together, 6.9% had a female householder with no husband present, 3.4% had a male householder with no wife present, and 20.7% were non-families. 20.7% of all households were made up of individuals, and 13.8% had someone living alone who was 65 years of age or older. The average household size was 2.45 and the average family size was 2.78.

The median age in the village was 48.3 years. 18.3% of residents were under the age of 18; 14% were between the ages of 18 and 24; 16.8% were from 25 to 44; 32.5% were from 45 to 64; and 18.3% were 65 years of age or older. The gender makeup of the village was 46.5% male and 53.5% female.

=== 2000 census ===
As of the census of 2000, there were 83 people, 33 households, and 25 families living in the village. The population density was 273.6 inhabitants per square mile (105.6/km^{2}). There were 33 housing units at an average density of 108.8 per square mile (42.0/km^{2}). The racial makeup of the village was 97.59% White, 1.20% Native American, and 1.20% from two or more races.

There were 33 households, out of which 36.4% had children under the age of 18 living with them, 66.7% were married couples living together, 9.1% had a female householder with no husband present, and 24.2% were non-families. 21.2% of all households were made up of individuals, and 18.2% had someone living alone who was 65 years of age or older. The average household size was 2.52 and the average family size was 2.92.

In the village, the population was spread out, with 27.7% under the age of 18, 2.4% from 18 to 24, 28.9% from 25 to 44, 20.5% from 45 to 64, and 20.5% who were 65 years of age or older. The median age was 40 years. For every 100 females, there were 69.4 males. For every 100 females age 18 and over, there were 71.4 males.

The median income for a household in the village was $44,583, and the median income for a family was $47,500. Males had a median income of $32,500 versus $16,250 for females. The per capita income for the village was $17,501. There were 11.5% of families and 12.8% of the population living below the poverty line, including 23.8% of under eighteens and none of those over 64.
