= Long Branch (Salt River tributary) =

Stream in the American state of Missouri

Long Branch is a stream in Boone, Audrain and Monroe counties of the U.S. state of Missouri. It is a tributary of the Salt River within the waters of Mark Twain Lake.

The stream source is in northeast Boone County about 1.5 miles west of Centralia at 39°12′31″N 92°10′16″W. The stream flows generally north through western Audrain County and into southwestern Monroe County just west of the community of Tulip. The stream turns east and generally follows the Audrain-Monroe county line for approximately 17 miles. Then the stream turn north and passes west of Santa Fe for about 3.5 miles to its confluence with the Salt River, at 39°24′10″N 91°49′17″W.

Long Branch was so named on account of its relatively long length.

== See also ==
- List of rivers of Missouri
