= Tulip, Missouri =

Unincorporated community in Missouri, United States

Coordinates: 39°20′34″N 92°09′26″W

Tulip is an unincorporated community in northwest Audrain and southwest Monroe counties, in the U.S. state of Missouri. The community is on Monroe county road 92. Long Branch flows past approximately one mile west and north of the site. Moberly is approximately 15 miles to the north-northwest in Randolph County and Centralia is eight miles south in northeast Boone County, Missouri.

== History ==
A post office was established at Tulip in 1879, and remained in operation until 1907. The community was so named by a settler who was fond of tulips.
