= Samuel G. Fuqua =

US Navy admiral and Medal of Honor recipient (1899–1987)

Samuel Glenn Fuqua
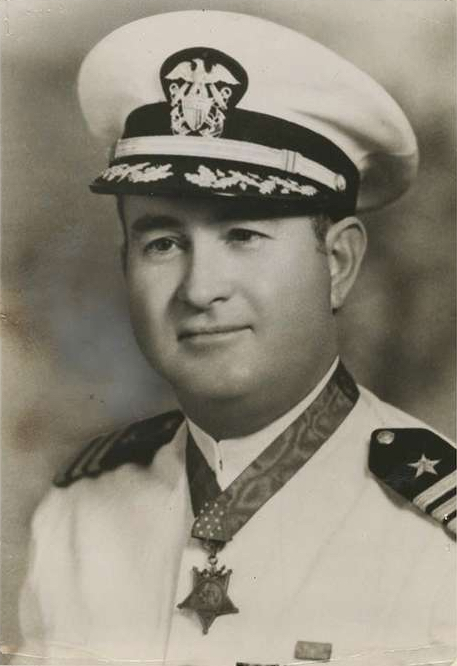
- Commander Samuel G. Fuqua
- Born: October 15, 1899; Laddonia, Missouri, US
- Died: January 27, 1987 (aged 87); Decatur, Georgia, US
- Burial place: Arlington National Cemetery
- Military career
- Allegiance: United States of America
- Branch: United States Army; United States Navy
- Service years: 1923–1953
- Rank: Rear Admiral
- Units: USS Arizona (BB-39); USS Macdonough (DD-331); USS Mississippi (BB-41); USS Tuscaloosa (CA-37)
- Commands: USS Bittern (AM-36); USS Dixie (AD-14)
- Conflicts: World War I World War II: Attack on Pearl Harbor
- Awards: Medal of Honor; Legion of Merit

Samuel Glenn Fuqua (October 15, 1899 – January 27, 1987) was a United States Navy rear admiral and a recipient of America's highest military decoration, the Medal of Honor, for his actions in World War II during the attack on Pearl Harbor.

== Biography ==
Samuel was born October 15, 1899, a native of Laddonia, Missouri, and entered the United States Naval Academy in July 1919, after a year at the University of Missouri and World War I service in the Army. Following graduation and commissioning in June 1923, he served in the battleship USS Arizona, destroyer USS Macdonough and battleship USS Mississippi before receiving shore duty at San Francisco, California, from 1930 to 1932. Lieutenant Fuqua served in other ships and shore stations during the mid-1930s, and was commanding officer of the minesweeper USS Bittern in the Asiatic Fleet in 1937–1939.

After service at the Naval Training Station, Great Lakes, Illinois, from 1939 to 1941, Lieutenant Commander Fuqua returned to Arizona as the ship's Damage Control Officer and first lieutenant, and was on board her during Japan's December 7, 1941, attack on Pearl Harbor. Though knocked unconscious by a bomb that hit the ship's stern early in the attack, he subsequently directed fire fighting and rescue efforts. After the ship's forward magazines exploded, he was her senior surviving officer and was responsible for saving her remaining crewmen. For his actions at that time, he was awarded the Medal of Honor.

During most of 1942, Fuqua was an officer of the cruiser USS Tuscaloosa and was promoted to commander. From 1943 to 1944, he was assigned to duty at Guantanamo Bay, Cuba, later attended the Naval War College, and was promoted to the rank of captain.

Captain Fuqua was Operations Officer for Commander Seventh Fleet from January to August 1945, helping to plan and execute several amphibious operations in the Philippines and Borneo area. Following the war, he served in other staff positions, and from 1949 to 1950 commanded the destroyer tender USS Dixie. After service as Chief of Staff of the Eighth Naval District, he retired from active duty in July 1953, receiving at that time the rank of rear admiral on the basis of his combat awards.

He died January 27, 1987, in Decatur, Georgia, and was buried at Arlington National Cemetery, in Arlington, Virginia.

== Awards and decorations ==

1st row	Medal of Honor		
2nd row	Legion of Merit	Combat Action Ribbon	World War I Victory Medal
3rd row	China Service Medal	American Defense Service Medal with Fleet Clasp	American Campaign Medal
4th row	European–African–Middle Eastern Campaign Medal with one campaign star	Asiatic-Pacific Campaign Medal with two campaign stars	World War II Victory Medal
5th row	Navy Occupation Service Medal with 'ASIA' clasp	National Defense Service Medal	Philippine Liberation Medal with one campaign star

=== Medal of Honor citation ===
Lieutenant Commander Fuqua's official Medal of Honor citation reads:

For distinguished conduct in action, outstanding heroism, and utter disregard of his own safety, above and beyond the call of duty during the attack on the Fleet in Pearl Harbor, by Japanese forces on 7 December 1941. Upon the commencement of the attack, Lieutenant Commander Fuqua rushed to the quarterdeck of the U.S.S. Arizona to which he was attached where he was stunned and knocked down by the explosion of a large bomb which hit the quarterdeck, penetrated several decks, and started a severe fire. Upon regaining consciousness, he began to direct the fighting of the fire and the rescue of wounded and injured personnel. Almost immediately there was a tremendous explosion forward, which made the ship appear to rise out of the water, shudder and settle down by the bow rapidly. The whole forward part of the ship was enveloped in flames which were spreading rapidly, and wounded and burned men were pouring out of the ship to the quarterdeck. Despite these conditions, his harrowing experience, and severe enemy bombing and strafing, at the time, Lieutenant Commander Fuqua continued to direct the fighting of fires in order to check them while the wounded and burned could be taken from the ship, and supervised the rescue of these men in such an amazingly calm and cool manner and with such excellent judgement, that it inspired everyone who saw him and undoubtedly resulted in the saving of many lives. After realizing that the ship could not be saved and that he was the senior surviving officer aboard, he directed that it be abandoned, but continued to remain on the quarterdeck and directed abandoning ship and rescue of personnel until satisfied that all personnel that could be had been saved, after which he left the ship with the (last) boatload. The conduct of Lieutenant Commander Fuqua was not only in keeping with the highest traditions of the Naval Service but characterizes him as an outstanding leader of men.

== See also ==
- List of Medal of Honor recipients for World War II
