= Reese Fork =

Stream in the U.S. state of Missouri

Reese Fork is a stream in Audrain, Monroe and Randolph counties the U.S. state of Missouri. It is a tributary to Allen Creek.

The stream headwaters arise in southeastern Randolph County along the east side of Missouri Route P about 2.5 miles north of the community of Clark with an elevation of 850 feet at 39°19′49″N 92°19′43″W. The stream flows east into northwestern Audrain County then turns to the northeast and enters Monroe County. The stream enters Allen Creek adjacent to Missouri Route 151 six miles south of Madison. The confluence is at 39°23′13″N 92°12′34″W at an elevation of 741 feet.

Reese Fork has the name of an early settler.

== See also ==
- List of rivers of Missouri
