= Hollensville, Missouri =

Unincorporated community in Missouri, United States

Coordinates: 39°18′47″N 91°59′08″W

Hollensville is an unincorporated community in Audrain County, in the U.S. state of Missouri.

== History ==
A post office was established at Hollensville in 1896, and remained in operation until 1907. J. W. Hollingshead, an early postmaster, gave the community his last name.
