= Benton City, Missouri =

- Village
- Village of Benton City
- Post Office

- Location of Benton City, Missouri
- Coordinates: 39°08′04″N 91°45′54″W
- Country: United States
- State: Missouri
- County: Audrain

Area
  - Total: 0.10 sq mi (0.27 km^{2})
  - Land: 0.10 sq mi (0.27 km^{2})
  - Water: 0 sq mi (0.00 km^{2})
- Elevation: 824 ft (251 m)

Population (2020)
  - Total: 100
  - Density: 973.0/sq mi (375.69/km^{2})
- Time zone: UTC-6 (Central (CST))
  - Summer (DST): UTC-5 (CDT)
- ZIP code: 65232
- Area code: 573
- FIPS code: 29-04834
- GNIS feature ID: 2398097

Benton City is a village in Audrain County, Missouri, United States. The population was 100 at the 2020 census.

== History ==
Benton City was platted in 1881. The village is named after Thomas Hart Benton.

Benton City Presbyterian Church

== Geography ==
Benton City is located at 39°8′5″N 91°45′52″W (39.134798, -91.764443).

According to the United States Census Bureau, the village has a total area of 0.10 square miles (0.26 km^{2}), all land.

== Demographics ==
Historical population
Census	Pop.	Note	%±
1880	64		—
1890	109		70.3%
1900	116		6.4%
1910	233		100.9%
1920	130		−44.2%
1930	120		−7.7%
1940	136		13.3%
1950	141		3.7%
1960	155		9.9%
1970	121		−21.9%
1980	155		28.1%
1990	139		−10.3%
2000	122		−12.2%
2010	104		−14.8%
2020	101		−2.9%
U.S. Decennial Census

=== 2010 census ===
As of the census of 2010, there were 104 people, 49 households, and 37 families residing in the village. The population density was 1,040.0 inhabitants per square mile (401.5/km^{2}). There were 59 housing units at an average density of 590.0 per square mile (227.8/km^{2}). The racial makeup of the village was 99.0% White and 1.0% from other races. Hispanic or Latino of any race were 1.0% of the population.

There were 49 households, of which 16.3% had children under the age of 18 living with them, 63.3% were married couples living together, 10.2% had a female householder with no husband present, 2.0% had a male householder with no wife present, and 24.5% were non-families. 22.4% of all households were made up of individuals, and 12.2% had someone living alone who was 65 years of age or older. The average household size was 2.12 and the average family size was 2.43.

The median age in the village was 49 years. 9.6% of residents were under the age of 18; 7.6% were between the ages of 18 and 24; 25% were from 25 to 44; 32.8% were from 45 to 64; and 25% were 65 years of age or older. The gender makeup of the village was 51.0% male and 49.0% female.

=== 2000 census ===
As of the census of 2000, there were 122 people, 53 households, and 38 families residing in the village. The population density was 1,177.0 inhabitants per square mile (454.4/km^{2}). There were 60 housing units at an average density of 578.9 per square mile (223.5/km^{2}). The racial makeup of the village was 97.54% White and 2.46% Native American. Hispanic or Latino of any race were 0.82% of the population.

There were 53 households, out of which 24.5% had children under the age of 18 living with them, 62.3% were married couples living together, 3.8% had a female householder with no husband present, and 28.3% were non-families. 22.6% of all households were made up of individuals, and 5.7% had someone living alone who was 65 years of age or older. The average household size was 2.30 and the average family size was 2.66.

The age distribution was as follows: 20.5% under the age of 18, 13.1% from 18 to 24, 27.0% from 25 to 44, 25.4% from 45 to 64, and 13.9% who were 65 years of age or older. The median age was 38 years. For every 100 females, there were 106.8 males. For every 100 females age 18 and over, there were 125.6 males.

The median income for a household in the village was $41,250, and the median income for a family was $42,000. Males had a median income of $24,861 versus $18,750 for females. The per capita income for the village was $16,112. None of the population and none of the families were below the poverty line.

== Notable person ==
- Anna J. Harrison - First woman president of the American Chemical Society
