= Anna J. Harrison =

American organic chemist (1912–1998)

- Born: December 23, 1912; Benton City, Missouri, U.S.
- Died: August 8, 1998 (aged 85); Holyoke, Massachusetts, U.S.
- Education: B.A., 1933, M.A., 1937, Ph.D., 1940 in chemistry, B.A., 1935 in education University of Missouri
- Known for: Professor of chemistry, Mount Holyoke College; first female president of the American Chemical Society
- Awards: 20 honorary degrees
- Scientific career
- Institutions: Worked in an elementary school in Audrain County

Anna Jane Harrison (December 23, 1912 – August 8, 1998) was an American organic chemist and a professor of chemistry at Mount Holyoke College for nearly forty years. She was the first female president of the American Chemical Society, and the recipient of twenty honorary degrees. She was nationally known for her teaching and was active nationally and internationally as a supporter of women in science.

== Early life and education ==
Anna Jane Harrison was born in Benton City, Missouri, on December 23, 1912. Her parents, Albert Harrison and Mary Katherine Jones Harrison, were farmers. Her father died when she was seven, leaving her mother to manage the family farm and to care for Harrison and her elder brother. She first became interested in science while attending high school in Mexico, Missouri. She received her B.A. in 1933 in chemistry, a B.A. in 1935 in education, a M.A. in 1937 in chemistry, and a Ph.D. in 1940 in physical chemistry, all from the University of Missouri in Columbia, Missouri. Her Ph.D. dissertation focused on reactions involving sodium ketyls.

== Career ==
While working towards her master's degree in chemistry, Harrison taught elementary school at the one-room country school in Audrain County, Missouri, where she had attended school as a child. She then taught chemistry at H. Sophie Newcomb Memorial College, the coordinate women's college of Tulane University from 1940 to 1945.

In 1942 while on leave from teaching during World War II, Harrison conducted secret wartime research at the University of Missouri. In 1944, she conducted research on toxic smoke for the National Defense Research Committee, the A.J. Griner Co. in Kansas City, Missouri and Corning Glass Works in Corning, New York. This work was instrumental in the creation of smoke-detecting field kits for the United States Army. She received the Frank Forrest Award from the American Ceramic Society for her research.

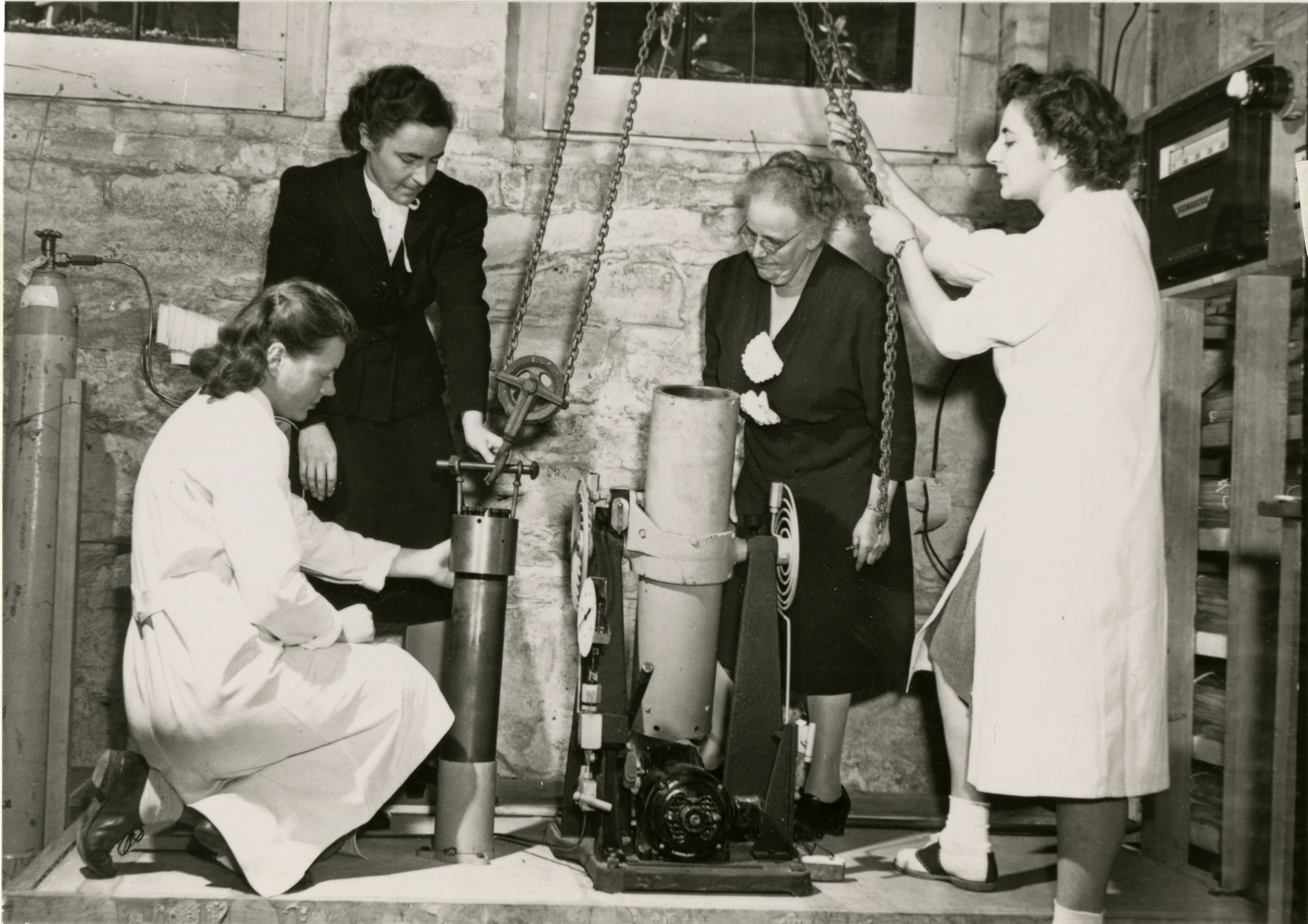
Kathleen Zier, Anna Jane Harrison, Mary Sherrill, Marie Mercury, c. 1947. Gift of Marie Mercury Roth, Science History Institute Collections

In 1945, she joined the chemistry department at Mount Holyoke College as an assistant professor. She came to Holyoke to work with professor and researcher Emma P. Carr. She became a full professor in the department in 1950 and served as the chair from 1960 to 1966. She retired from Mount Holyoke College in 1979. After retirement she taught at the U.S. Naval Academy in Annapolis, Maryland.

Harrison's research focused on the structure of organic compounds and their interaction with light, particularly in the ultraviolet and far ultraviolet bands. She received a grant from the Petroleum Research Fund Advisory Board of the American Chemical Society for "an experimental study of the far ultraviolet absorption spectra and photodecomposition products of selected organic compounds."

She served on the National Science Board from 1972 to 1978. In 1978 she became the first female president of the American Chemical Society. She also served as president of the American Association for the Advancement of Science in 1983.

As an educator and researcher, Harrison worked with many scientific organizations in the United States, particularly the American Chemical Society, the American Association for the Advancement of Science, the Association of American Colleges, the Chemical Manufacturers Association, the Education Commission of the States, the Lunar and Planetary Institute, the Manufacturing Chemists' Association, the National Academy of Sciences, the National Research Council, the National Science Board, and the National Science Foundation.

As a representative of these organizations, she traveled to India for the National Science Foundation in 1971, to Antarctica in 1974 for the National Science Board, to Japan, Spain, and Thailand as president of the American Chemical Society in 1978, and to India for the American Association for the Advancement of Science in 1983.

She wrote articles for Journal of the American Chemical Society, Chemical & Engineering News, and Encyclopædia Britannica. She served on the editorial boards of the National Science Teachers Association's Journal of College Science Teaching and Chemical & Engineering News.

In 1989 she co-authored a textbook with Mount Holyoke College colleague Edwin S. Weaver entitled Chemistry: A Search to Understand.

She was interested in working towards increased funding for science education by state and federal agencies and promoting the cause of women in science.

She died in Holyoke, Massachusetts at the age of eighty-five from a stroke.

== See also ==
- Timeline of women in science
