= Sailing (disambiguation) =

Sailing is the practice of navigating a sail-powered craft on water, ice, or land.

Sailing or Sailin' may also refer to:

- Sailing (sport), an organized sport

== Music ==
=== Albums ===
- Sailin', an album by Kim Carnes, or the title song, 1976
- Sailing (album), by AKMU, 2019

=== Songs ===
- "Sailing" (Sutherland Brothers song), 1972; covered by Rod Stewart (1975)
- "Sailing" (Christopher Cross song), 1980
- "Sailing" (AAA song), 2012
- "Sailing (0805)", a 2016 song by Girls' Generation

== Television ==
- "Sailing" (Balamory), a 2003 episode
- "Sailing" (Birds of a Feather), a 1989 episode

== See also ==
- Saling (disambiguation)
- Solar sail, a method of spacecraft propulsion
