= Saling, Missouri =

Unincorporated community in Missouri, United States

Coordinates: 39°18′48″N 92°09′31″W

Saling is an unincorporated community in Audrain County, in the U.S. state of Missouri.

== History ==
A post office called Saling was established in 1884, and remained in operation until 1904. The community takes its name from Saling Township.
