= Skinner, Missouri =

Unincorporated community in Missouri, United States

Coordinates: 39°15′59″N 91°59′21″W

Skinner is an unincorporated community in Audrain County, in the U.S. state of Missouri.

== History ==
A post office called Skinner was established in 1893, and remained in operation until 1900. The community bears the name of an early settler.
