= Laddonia, Missouri =

- City
- City of Laddonia
- Laddonia in 2026

- Seal

- Location of Laddonia, Missouri
- Coordinates: 39°14′35″N 91°38′35″W
- Country: United States
- State: Missouri
- County: Audrain

Area
  - Total: 0.71 sq mi (1.83 km^{2})
  - Land: 0.71 sq mi (1.83 km^{2})
  - Water: 0 sq mi (0.00 km^{2})
- Elevation: 784 ft (239 m)

Population (2020)
  - Total: 502
  - Density: 712.1/sq mi (274.95/km^{2})
- Time zone: UTC-6 (Central (CST))
  - Summer (DST): UTC-5 (CDT)
- ZIP code: 63352
- Area code: 573
- FIPS code: 29-39602
- GNIS feature ID: 2395580
- Website: laddoniamo.org

Laddonia is a city in Audrain County, Missouri, United States. The population was 502 at the 2020 census.

== History ==
Laddonia was laid out in 1871. It was named for Amos Ladd, an early settler, and his wife, Onia. A post office has been in operation at Laddonia since 1871.

== Geography ==
Laddonia is located at 39°14′25″N 91°38′37″W (39.240331, -91.643501).

According to the United States Census Bureau, the city has a total area of 0.65 square miles (1.68 km^{2}), all land.

== Demographics ==
Historical population
Census	Pop.	Note	%±
1890	528		—
1900	619		17.2%
1910	614		−0.8%
1920	580		−5.5%
1930	576		−0.7%
1940	588		2.1%
1950	599		1.9%
1960	671		12.0%
1970	745		11.0%
1980	726		−2.6%
1990	581		−20.0%
2000	620		6.7%
2010	513		−17.3%
2020	502		−2.1%
2023 (est.)	505		0.6%
U.S. Decennial Census

=== 2010 census ===
As of the census of 2010, there were 513 people, 226 households, and 140 families living in the city. The population density was 789.2 inhabitants per square mile (304.7/km^{2}). There were 274 housing units at an average density of 421.5 per square mile (162.7/km^{2}). The racial makeup of the city was 98.8% White, 0.4% African American, 0.6% Native American, and 0.2% from two or more races. Hispanic or Latino of any race were 0.4% of the population.

There were 226 households, of which 27.0% had children under the age of 18 living with them, 44.2% were married couples living together, 14.6% had a female householder with no husband present, 3.1% had a male householder with no wife present, and 38.1% were non-families. 33.6% of all households were made up of individuals, and 12.4% had someone living alone who was 65 years of age or older. The average household size was 2.27 and the average family size was 2.88.

The median age in the city was 44.4 years. 22.4% of residents were under the age of 18; 6.9% were between the ages of 18 and 24; 21.3% were from 25 to 44; 32.5% were from 45 to 64; and 17% were 65 years of age or older. The gender makeup of the city was 48.5% male and 51.5% female.

=== 2000 census ===
As of the census of 2000, there were 620 people, 254 households, and 170 families living in the city. The population density was 1,123.7 inhabitants per square mile (433.9/km^{2}). There were 278 housing units at an average density of 503.9 per square mile (194.6/km^{2}). The racial makeup of the city was 97.74% White, 0.81% African American, 0.32% Native American, and 1.13% from two or more races. Hispanic or Latino of any race were 0.16% of the population.

There were 254 households, out of which 29.9% had children under the age of 18 living with them, 50.4% were married couples living together, 11.8% had a female householder with no husband present, and 32.7% were non-families. 28.7% of all households were made up of individuals, and 18.1% had someone living alone who was 65 years of age or older. The average household size was 2.44 and the average family size was 2.95.

In the city, the population was spread out, with 26.6% under the age of 18, 7.6% from 18 to 24, 27.4% from 25 to 44, 22.1% from 45 to 64, and 16.3% who were 65 years of age or older. The median age was 38 years. For every 100 females, there were 96.2 males. For every 100 females age 18 and over, there were 89.6 males.

The median income for a household in the city was $31,250, and the median income for a family was $33,333. Males had a median income of $23,125 versus $21,250 for females. The per capita income for the city was $17,516. About 3.4% of families and 4.4% of the population were below the poverty line, including 7.8% of those under age 18 and 2.2% of those age 65 or over.

== Education ==
Public education is administered by Community R-VI School District, which operates Community Elementary School in Laddonia.

Laddonia has a lending library, a branch of the Mexico-Audrain Library District.

== Notable people ==
- Samuel Glenn Fuqua, United States Navy rear admiral and Medal of Honor recipient
- Lloyd Morey, interim Illinois Auditor of Public Accounts and educator
