= Johns Branch (West Fork Cuivre River tributary) =

Stream in the U.S. state of Missouri

Coordinates: 39.2078179°N 91.6076604°W

Johns Branch is a stream in Audrain County in the U.S. state of Missouri. It is a tributary of West Fork Cuivre River.

Johns Branch has the name of one Mr. Johns, an early settler.

== See also ==
- List of rivers of Missouri
