= Martinsburg, Missouri =

- City
- City of Martinsburg
- Old Martinsburg Jail

- Location of Martinsburg, Missouri
- Coordinates: 39°6′4″N 91°38′50″W
- Country: United States
- State: Missouri
- County: Audrain
- Founded: 1857
- Named for: William R. Martin

Area
  - Total: 0.27 sq mi (0.71 km^{2})
  - Land: 0.27 sq mi (0.71 km^{2})
  - Water: 0 sq mi (0.00 km^{2})
- Elevation: 804 ft (245 m)

Population (2020)
  - Total: 251
  - Density: 919.0/sq mi (354.82/km^{2})
- Time zone: UTC-6 (Central (CST))
  - Summer (DST): UTC-5 (CDT)
- ZIP code: 65264
- Area code: 573
- FIPS code: 29-46460
- GNIS feature ID: 2396739

Martinsburg is a city in Audrain County, Missouri, United States. The population was 304 at the 2010 census.

== History ==
Martinsburg was founded in 1857 and was named after its founder, William R. Martin.

== Geography ==
Martinsburg is located at 39°6′4″N 91°38′50″W (39.101182, -91.647355).

According to the United States Census Bureau, the city has a total area of 0.27 square miles (0.70 km^{2}), all land.

== Demographics ==
Historical population
Census	Pop.	Note	%±
1880	225		—
1890	276		22.7%
1900	345		25.0%
1910	436		26.4%
1920	510		17.0%
1930	530		3.9%
1940	422		−20.4%
1950	296		−29.9%
1960	330		11.5%
1970	318		−3.6%
1980	309		−2.8%
1990	337		9.1%
2000	326		−3.3%
2010	304		−6.7%
2020	251		−17.4%
U.S. Decennial Census

=== 2010 census ===
As of the census of 2010, there were 304 people, 137 households, and 87 families living in the city. The population density was 1,125.9 inhabitants per square mile (434.7/km^{2}). There were 152 housing units at an average density of 563.0 per square mile (217.4/km^{2}). The racial makeup of the city was 98.0% White, 1.0% African American, 0.3% Asian, 0.3% from other races, and 0.3% from two or more races. Hispanic or Latino of any race were 1.3% of the population.

There were 137 households, of which 29.9% had children under the age of 18 living with them, 52.6% were married couples living together, 5.8% had a female householder with no husband present, 5.1% had a male householder with no wife present, and 36.5% were non-families. 32.8% of all households were made up of individuals, and 13.9% had someone living alone who was 65 years of age or older. The average household size was 2.22 and the average family size was 2.79.

The median age in the city was 43.3 years. 23% of residents were under the age of 18; 5.9% were between the ages of 18 and 24; 22.4% were from 25 to 44; 24.3% were from 45 to 64; and 24.3% were 65 years of age or older. The gender makeup of the city was 52.0% male and 48.0% female.

=== 2000 census ===
As of the census of 2000, there were 326 people, 134 households, and 97 families living in the town. The population density was 1,255.3 inhabitants per square mile (484.7/km^{2}). There were 148 housing units at an average density of 569.9 per square mile (220.0/km^{2}). The racial makeup of the town was 98.16% White, 0.61% African American, and 1.23% from two or more races. Hispanic or Latino of any race were 0.61% of the population.

There were 134 households, out of which 34.3% had children under the age of 18 living with them, 61.2% were married couples living together, 6.7% had a female householder with no husband present, and 26.9% were non-families. 22.4% of all households were made up of individuals, and 11.9% had someone living alone who was 65 years of age or older. The average household size was 2.43 and the average family size was 2.86.

In the town the population was spread out, with 25.8% under the age of 18, 7.4% from 18 to 24, 29.4% from 25 to 44, 21.5% from 45 to 64, and 16.0% who were 65 years of age or older. The median age was 38 years. For every 100 females, there were 107.6 males. For every 100 females age 18 and over, there were 112.3 males.

The median income for a household in the town was $31,442, and the median income for a family was $33,125. Males had a median income of $22,917 versus $23,438 for females. The per capita income for the town was $17,562. About 6.6% of families and 4.6% of the population were below the poverty line, including 3.4% of those under age 18 and 4.5% of those age 65 or over.

== Education ==
St Joseph Elementary School in Martinsburg is a private, Roman Catholic institution.

Martinsburg has a lending library, a branch of the Mexico-Audrain Library District.

== Notable person ==
- Adolph John Paschang, Roman Catholic bishop
