= Skinners Family Hotel =

Heritage-listed former pub and retail building in Sydney, Australia

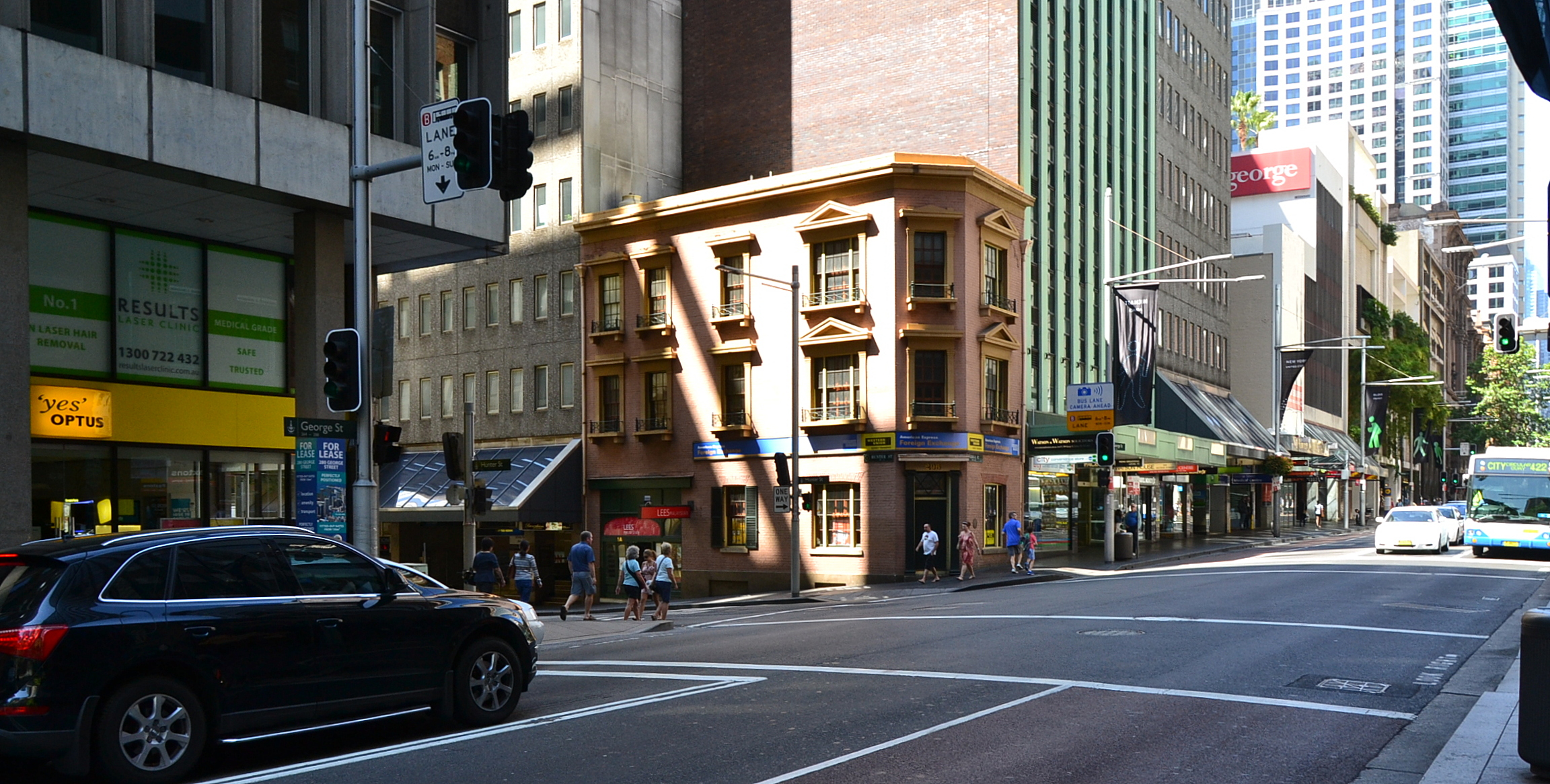

- Location within Sydney Location within Australia
- 33.8656°S 151.2075°E
- Location: 296 George Street, Sydney central business district, City of Sydney, New South Wales, Australia

History
- Built: 1845–46

Site notes
- Architect: Henry Robertson
- Architectural style: Old Colonial Regency

New South Wales Heritage Register
- Official name: Skinners Family Hotel
- Type: State heritage (built)
- Designated: 2 April 1999
- Reference no.: 584
- Type: Hotel
- Category: Commercial

The Skinners Family Hotel is a heritage-listed former pub and now retail optometrist shop, located at 296 George Street, in the Sydney central business district, in the City of Sydney local government area of New South Wales, Australia. It was added to the New South Wales State Heritage Register on 2 April 1999.

== History ==
The site of the former Skinners Hotel was part of the original grant to Edward Riley in 1823. The property was sold to Issac Simmons in 1845 and a hotel constructed in 1845-46, designed by architect Henry Robertson. There is no documentary evidence but it appears that this is the building standing today. The building was named the Clown Hotel and the publican for 1846-49 was George Skinner. Other occupants included Andrew Torning (1849–55); Jno. Turner (1855-58); and Ralph Tolants (1858–60). In 1860 it was named Turner's Hotel, and in 1866 became known as the Clarendon Hotel. Licensees at the time were Margaret Harris and Henry Barnett. The proprietor of the hotel in 1873 was Benjamin Fyffe. From this point the building ceased to function as a hotel and became a chemist shop until 1900. Walter and Herbert Shrimpton (hatters) leased part of the premises at this time.

A. H. Phillips, Orwell Phillips, A. E. Phillips, Ernest Lawton Davis and Louis Morris Phillips were joint proprietors in 1931 with an additional proprietor, Rex Cullen-Ward. A number of changes in the joint tenants resulted in the transfer of the property to Albert and Hannar Edmunds, George Laird and R. G. Holdings in 1950. Hallam Limited were the proprietors in 1925 and the property was leased to Osbourne Henry Harding and Victor Read (mercers) for the first and second floor in 1923. Hallam sold the property to the Phillips partnership in 1927 who were in possession in 1935. In 1955 the building was transferred from John Fairfax to George Coultor, and to Advance Bank Australia Limited in 1987. Advance Bank restored the building to its 1849 appearance with the assistance of architect Clive Lucas, with the restoration completed in 1989. Prior to the restoration, there were concerns that the building may have been at risk of demolition. In 2018, the building is occupied by an outlet of optometrist chain Oscar Wylee.

== Description ==
The former Skinner's Family Hotel is a three-storey building with cellar designed in the Old Colonial Regency style. The facade features narrow small pane windows with rendered frames and projecting hoods which appear original, grouped in singles and pairs while the main internal space on the first and second floor features a wide window of three sections topped by a pediment. All windows feature blocking under the projecting sills and decorative cast iron grilles. The main entrance at ground floor level features an attached ribbed pilaster with Ionic capital supporting an entablature and hood. The interior of the (former) banking chamber is fitted out with plasterboard ceilings and rendered walls, while some of the upper floors retain some original fabric such as fireplaces and pressed metal ceilings. The windows on the upper floors appear to be original but the ground floor windows have been replaced.

== Heritage listing ==
The Skinners Family Hotel was listed on the New South Wales State Heritage Register on 2 April 1999.

The former Skinners Hotel, located at the corner of George and Hunter Streets is highly significant as one of the few Old Colonial Regency buildings remaining in the city. The former hotel has significance as one of only four buildings in the Old Colonial Regency style in the city although it no longer has the traditional hotel uses of bar and accommodation; the other buildings in the style are the Lord Nelson Hotel, the Hero of Waterloo Hotel and a commercial terrace at 246 George Street. While the Lord Nelson is the finest example of the remaining buildings, this former hotel is also significant for its strong contribution to the character of the immediate area and as one of the few remaining buildings of this style in the heart of the city. It has significance as a rare surviving example of an early hotel and as part of the network of corner hotels which provided social / recreational venues and budget accommodation in the city. It has significance as a possible site for scientific investigation due to the age of the building and continuing use of the site since the early days of European settlement. The building now carries the name of the first licensee of the hotel.

== See also ==
- Pubs in Sydney
