= Rowena, Missouri =

Unincorporated community in Missouri, United States

Coordinates: 39°19′33″N 92°03′28″W

Rowena is an unincorporated community in Audrain County, Missouri, United States.

== History ==
A post office called Rowena was established in 1884, and remained in operation until 1912. The community was named after Hiley Rowe, a local merchant.
