= Mayes Branch =

Stream in the American state of Missouri

Coordinates: 38.7761232°N 93.6671594°W

Mayes Branch is a stream in Audrain County in the U.S. state of Missouri.

Mayes Branch has the name of Benjamin Mays, the original owner of the site.

== See also ==
- List of rivers of Missouri
