= James Hunter Audrain =

American politician

James Hunter Audrain (December 29, 1781 – November 10, 1831) was an American politician and Colonel of Militia, who served during the War of 1812. Audrain County, Missouri, was named for him.

== Biography ==
Audrain was born in 1781 in Bucks County, Pennsylvania. He married Mary Elizabeth Wells (1785–1834) on 12 December 1806 in Louisville, Kentucky. They had nine children.

Audrain settled in the Six Mile District, near Fort Osage, Missouri, in 1810, going into business with his brother Francois.

In the report of the Northwestern Army, in an expedition against the Massassineway villages led by Lieut. Col. John B. Campbell, Audrain was listed as one of eight "spies and guides." This battle was the first major American victory of the War of 1812.

Audrain then lived in O'Fallon where he farmed, ran a tavern, and operated a gristmill on Peruque Creek called "Bulls Hell Mill."

Later he settled in St. Charles County, Missouri, and was elected from there in 1830 to be a member of the State Legislature. He died on November 10, 1831 while visiting the home of William Clark of the Lewis and Clark Expedition.
