= Mexico Senior High School =

Location
- 639 North Wade St; Mexico, Missouri 65265; United States
- 39.1778°N 91.8909°W

Information
- Superintendent: Zachary Templeton
- Principal: Brad Ellebracht
- Teaching staff: 43.98 (FTE)
- Grades: 9–12
- Enrollment: 760 (2023–2024)
- Student to teacher ratio: 17.28
- Color
- Team name: Bulldogs
- Website: www.mexicoschools.net/64860_2

Mexico Senior High School is a high school in Mexico, Missouri, USA. It was originally built in 1926. Over the years, additions and improvements have been made to the high school.

== Notable alumni ==
- Pendleton Dudley - American journalist and public relations executive, attended for two years and dropped out
- Tyronn Lue - American professional basketball coach and former player, attended for one year and transferred
- Jouett Shouse - American lawyer, newspaper publisher, and leading Democratic politician
- While not alumni, Marjorie Finlay, Taylor Swift’s grandmother has performed here as part of the Lindenwood Vesper Choir.
