= Audrain County, Missouri =

County in Missouri, United States

- County
- The Audrain County Courthouse in Mexico

- Seal
- Nickname: Biofuel Capital of Missouri
- Location within the U.S. state of Missouri
- Coordinates: 39°13′N 91°50′W
- Country: United States
- State: Missouri
- Founded: December 17, 1836
- Named for: James Hunter Audrain
- Seat: Mexico
- Largest city: Mexico

Area
  - Total: 697 sq mi (1,810 km^{2})
  - Land: 692 sq mi (1,790 km^{2})
  - Water: 4.6 sq mi (12 km^{2}) 0.7%

Population (2020)
  - Total: 24,962
  - Estimate (2025): 24,528 ▼
  - Density: 35.4/sq mi (13.7/km^{2})
- Time zone: UTC−6 (Central)
  - Summer (DST): UTC−5 (CDT)
- Congressional districts: 6th
- Website: www.audraincounty.org

Audrain County (/ɔːˈdreɪn/ aw-DRAYN) is a county located in the central part of the U.S. state of Missouri. As of the 2020 census, the population was 24,962. Its county seat is Mexico. The county was organized December 13, 1836, and named for Colonel James Hunter Audrain of the War of 1812 and who later was elected to the state legislature.

== History ==
Audrain county was formed from a non-county area with portions under the administration of Montgomery, Callaway, Boone, Ralls, or Monroe counties at various times prior to its official establishment in 1836. Thus, records for locations now in Audrain prior to 1836 may indicate location in those counties instead. Some details have been summarized on the website of the Northeast Missouri Genealogy Village, and a dynamic map showing some of the changes is on the 'mapgeeks' website showing historical maps of the states of the United States. (See 'External Links' below.)

Today's Audrain County historical website data (see 'External Links' below) indicates that the county was divided about 50/50 during the historic US Civil War and that US Army Commander General Ulysses Grant was resident there briefly during that time. While Audrain county shared some history with neighboring counties, it does not border the Missouri River.

According to some Confederate historian publications, Audrain County was one of several nearby counties settled by migrants from the Upper South, especially Kentucky and Tennessee; that some brought slaves and slaveholding traditions with them, cultivating crops similar to those in Middle Tennessee and Kentucky such as hemp and tobacco, or brought antebellum architecture and culture; and that the county was considered by those historians to be in the heart of what was called "Little Dixie".

== Geography ==
According to the United States Census Bureau, the county has a total area of 697 square miles (1,810 km^{2}), of which 692 square miles (1,790 km^{2}) is land and 4.6 square miles (12 km^{2}) (0.7%) is water.

=== Adjacent counties ===
- Monroe County (north)
- Ralls County (northeast)
- Pike County (east)
- Montgomery County (southeast)
- Callaway County (south)
- Boone County (southwest)
- Randolph County (northwest)

=== Major highways ===
- U.S. Route 54
- U.S. Route 54 Business
- Route 15
- Route 19
- Route 22
- Route 151

== Demographics ==
Historical population
Census	Pop.	Note	%±
1840	1,949		—
1850	3,506		79.9%
1860	8,075		130.3%
1870	12,307		52.4%
1880	19,732		60.3%
1890	22,074		11.9%
1900	21,160		−4.1%
1910	21,687		2.5%
1920	20,589		−5.1%
1930	22,077		7.2%
1940	22,673		2.7%
1950	23,829		5.1%
1960	26,079		9.4%
1970	25,362		−2.7%
1980	26,458		4.3%
1990	23,599		−10.8%
2000	25,853		9.6%
2010	25,529		−1.3%
2020	24,962		−2.2%
2025 (est.)	24,528	▼	−1.7%
U.S. Decennial Census; 1790-1960 1900-90; 1990-2000 2010-20 2025

Audrain County comprises the Mexico, MO Micropolitan Statistical Area, which is included in the Columbia-Moberly-Mexico, MO Combined Statistical Area.

=== Religion ===
According to the Association of Religion Data Archives County Membership Report (2010), Audrain County is sometimes regarded as being on the northern edge of the Bible Belt, with evangelical Protestantism being the most predominant religion. The most predominant denominations among residents in Audrain County who adhere to a religion are Southern Baptists (36.07%), Roman Catholics (12.55%), and Christian Churches and Churches of Christ (8.09%).

A vast portion of the Clark-area Amish community stands within Audrain County limits.

=== 2020 census ===
Audrain County, Missouri – Racial and ethnic composition Note: the US Census treats Hispanic/Latino as an ethnic category. This table excludes Latinos from the racial categories and assigns them to a separate category. Hispanics/Latinos may be of any race.
Race / Ethnicity (NH = Non-Hispanic)	Pop 1980	Pop 1990	Pop 2000	Pop 2010	Pop 2020	% 1980	% 1990	% 2000	% 2010	% 2020
White alone (NH)	24,620	21,976	23,425	22,613	21,450	93.05%	93.12%	90.61%	88.58%	85.93%
Black or African American alone (NH)	1,471	1,417	1,849	1,637	1,304	5.56%	6.00%	7.15%	6.41%	5.22%
Native American or Alaska Native alone (NH)	14	33	66	81	63	0.05%	0.14%	0.26%	0.32%	0.25%
Asian alone (NH)	56	83	88	115	114	0.21%	0.35%	0.34%	0.45%	0.46%
Native Hawaiian or Pacific Islander alone (NH)	x	x	6	4	2	x	x	0.02%	0.02%	0.01%
Other race alone (NH)	24	9	20	16	81	0.09%	0.04%	0.08%	0.06%	0.32%
Mixed race or Multiracial (NH)	x	x	210	398	1,217	x	x	0.81%	1.56%	4.88%
Hispanic or Latino (any race)	273	81	189	665	731	1.03%	0.34%	0.73%	2.60%	2.93%
Total	26,458	23,599	25,853	25,529	24,962	100.00%	100.00%	100.00%	100.00%	100.00%

As of the 2020 census, the county had a population of 24,962 and a median age of 39.9 years; 23.6% of residents were younger than 18 and 19.9% were 65 or older. For every 100 females there were 87.2 males, and for every 100 females age 18 and over there were 81.3 males; 45.5% of residents lived in urban areas while 54.5% lived in rural areas.

The racial makeup of the county was 86.7% White, 5.2% Black or African American, 0.4% American Indian and Alaska Native, 0.5% Asian, 0.0% Native Hawaiian and Pacific Islander, 1.5% from some other race, and 5.7% from two or more races. Hispanic or Latino residents of any race comprised 2.9% of the population.

There were 9,414 households in the county, of which 30.9% had children under the age of 18 living with them and 26.8% had a female householder with no spouse or partner present. About 28.9% of all households were made up of individuals and 13.5% had someone living alone who was 65 years of age or older.

There were 10,542 housing units, of which 10.7% were vacant. Among occupied housing units, 69.2% were owner-occupied and 30.8% were renter-occupied. The homeowner vacancy rate was 2.2% and the rental vacancy rate was 8.4%.

=== 2010 census ===
As of the census of 2010, there were 25,529 people, 9,844 households, and 6,762 families residing in the county. The population density was 37 inhabitants per square mile (14/km^{2}). There were 10,881 housing units at an average density of 16 units per square mile (6.2/km^{2}). 89.8% of the population were White, 6.4% Black or African American, 0.5% Asian, 0.4% Native American, 1.2% of some other race and 1.7% of two or more races. 2.6% were Hispanic or Latino (of any race). 33.2% were of German, 16.0% American, 9.3% Irish and 8.4% English ancestry.

There were 9,844 households, out of which 31.40% had children under the age of 18 living with them, 55.20% were married couples living together, 9.90% had a female householder with no husband present, and 31.30% were non-families. 27.80% of all households were made up of individuals, and 13.40% had someone living alone who was 65 years of age or older. The average household size was 2.43 and the average family size was 2.96.

In the county, the population was spread out, with 24.60% under the age of 18, 7.90% from 18 to 24, 28.20% from 25 to 44, 22.50% from 45 to 64, and 16.90% who were 65 years of age or older. The median age was 38 years. For every 100 females there were 84.20 males. For every 100 females age 18 and over, there were 78.70 males.

The median income for a household in the county was $32,057, and the median income for a family was $40,448. Males had a median income of $28,550 versus $20,712 for females. The per capita income for the county was $16,441. About 11.10% of families and 14.80% of the population were below the poverty line, including 23.30% of those under age 18 and 9.80% of those age 65 or over.

== Government and infrastructure ==
=== Audrain County E-911 Joint Communications ===
Audrain County Joint Communications is the primary public safety answering point (PSAP) for Audrain County, and is responsible for handling incoming and outgoing communication from the public for assistance from law enforcement, fire, and medical personnel throughout Audrain County. Joint Communications is specifically responsible for receiving incoming 9-1-1 emergency telephone calls, and dispatching the appropriate personnel; receiving other non-emergency telephone calls and dispatching, routing, or messaging those calls to the correct personnel; entering information into, and inquiring information from the Missouri Uniform Law Enforcement System (MULES) and the National Crime Information Center (NCIC) crime databases; maintaining a detailed computerized log of requests received and dispatched; and keeping current on city and county geography, so that members may assist responding personnel in locating addresses.

Joint Communications is located at 1854 East Liberty Street in Vandiver Village, and serves a coverage area of 697 square miles (1,800 km^{2}) with a population of nearly 26,000 people. Staff includes 7 full-time Dispatchers, 2 part-time Dispatchers, 3 full-time Shift Supervisors, the Assistant 911 Director, and the 911 Director. There is a minimum of two Dispatchers on duty at all times to answer incoming and outgoing communications.

Upgrades to the communications equipment and computer software were made when Mexico Public Safety Dispatch and Audrain County Sheriff's Dispatch consolidated to form the Joint Communications Center in October 1999. These upgrades allowed for even better service to the county. At that time the Vandalia Police Department elected to continue to operate their communications center for the Vandalia Police Department, Vandalia Fire District, and Van-Far Ambulance District. Audrain County Joint Communications and Vandalia Communications acted as backup sites for each other, so if anything happened to one center there would be no disruption of service to the residents and visitors of Audrain County.

In February 2007, Joint Communications implemented an Emergency Medical Dispatch (EMD) program utilizing the protocol-based Medical Priority Dispatch System created by the National Academies of Emergency Dispatch. This program allows dispatchers to quickly and accurately determine the nature of an emergency medical call and prioritize it to allow for the most appropriate response. Joint Communications's dispatchers are trained to provide real-time instruction of CPR and other life-saving first aid while simultaneously dispatching Emergency Medical Service (EMS) professionals to the emergency. This reduces the time between the onset of symptoms and when basic aid is provided to the patient, thus increasing the patient's chances of survival in life-threatening emergencies.

Another equipment upgrade was completed in March 2007. This upgrade included new 9-1-1 equipment and a new telephone and radio voice recorder. These upgrades were necessary to keep current with the latest technology available. With the new 9-1-1 system dispatchers have quicker access to a caller's telephone and address data and it introduced a mapping system to automatically plot emergency calls on a map, allowing for a faster response by emergency personnel as dispatchers previously had to look up addresses on the map manually. The new 9-1-1 system also allows for upgrades to accommodate future telephone and communications technologies. The previous 9-1-1 system was unable to process telephone number and location information from cellular telephone calls, which created a problem in determining the location of an emergency if the caller is unable to speak. The new 9-1-1 system is compatible with cellular telephone and Voice over Internet Protocol (VoIP) technologies, and these services will be added to the Audrain County E-911 system as they become available.

On February 15, 2008, Audrain County Joint Communications assumed the communications responsibilities for the Vandalia Police Department, Vandalia Fire District and Van-Far Ambulance District. Ralls County E-911 was designated as the backup PSAP for Audrain County Joint Communications so if anything were to happen to the Joint Communications Center there would be no disruption of service to the residents and visitors of Audrain County.

=== Emergency medical services ===
- Audrain Ambulance District
- Van-Far Ambulance District

=== Fire services ===
- Farber Fire Department
- Laddonia Fire Department
- Little Dixie Fire Protection District
- Martinsburg Fire Department
- Mexico Public Safety Department
- Vandalia Fire Department

=== Law enforcement ===
- Audrain County Sheriff's Office
- Farber Police Department
- Martinsburg Police Department
- Mexico Public Safety Department

=== Prison ===
The Women's Eastern Reception, Diagnostic and Correctional Center, a women's prison of the Missouri Department of Corrections, is located in Vandalia and in Audrain County.

== Education ==
K-12 school districts in Audrain County (including those which may have schools and/or administration buildings in other counties)

- Centralia R-VI School District
- Community R-VI School District
- Mexico Public Schools
- North Callaway County R-I School District
- Paris R-II School District
- Sturgeon R-V School District
- Van-Far R-I School District
- Wellsville-Middletown R-I School District

There is also a single elementary school district, Middle Grove C-1 School District.

=== Public schools ===
- Community R-VI School District – Laddonia
  - Community Elementary School (PK-05)
  - Community High School (06-12)
- Mexico Public Schools – Mexico
  - McMillan Early Learning Center (PK-K)
  - Hawthorne Elementary School (K-05)
  - Eugene Field Elementary School (K-05)
  - Mexico Middle School (06-08)
  - Mexico Senior High School (09-12)
- Van-Far R-I School District – Vandalia
  - Van-Far Elementary School (PK-06)
  - Van-Far High School (07-12)

=== Private schools ===
- Sunnydale Seventh-day Adventist Elementary School – Centralia (02-09) – Seventh-day Adventist
- St. Brendan School – Mexico (PK-08) – Roman Catholic
- St. Joseph Elementary School – Martinsburg (K-09) – Roman Catholic
- Missouri Military Academy – Mexico (07-12)

=== Public libraries ===
- Mexico-Audrain County Library District

== Communities ==
=== Cities ===
- Centralia (mostly in Boone County)
- Farber
- Laddonia
- Mexico (county seat)
- Vandalia

=== Villages ===
- Benton City
- Martinsburg
- Rush Hill
- Vandiver

=== Unincorporated communities ===
- Champ
- Hollensville
- Molino
- Rowena
- Saling
- Skinner
- Thompson
- Tulip
- Worcester

=== Townships ===
Audrain County is divided into eight townships:

- Cuivre
- Linn
- Loutre
- Prairie
- Saling
- Salt River
- South Fork
- Wilson

== Notable people ==
- Tom Bass, horse trainer
- Cookie Belcher, former professional basketball player
- Howard L. Bickley, Chief Justice of New Mexico
- Kit Bond - U.S. Senator (R-Missouri) (1987-2011) and Governor of Missouri (1973-1977 & 1981–1985)
- Jason Brookins, former NFL running back with the Baltimore Ravens
- Pendleton Dudley, journalist and public relations
- Charles Henry Hardin - Governor of Missouri (1875-1877) and co-founder of Beta Theta Pi fraternity
- Anna J. Harrison - First female president of the American Chemical Society
- Edward D. "Ted" Jones, broker
- Howard Kindig, former Super Bowl winning NFL player
- Tyronn Lue, head coach of the Los Angeles Clippers and former NBA player
- Adolph John Paschang, Roman Catholic bishop
- Prim Siripipat, television anchor
- Lebbeus R. Wilfley, federal judge
- Xenophon P. Wilfley, U.S. Senator (D-Missouri) (1918-1918)

== Politics ==
=== Local ===
Politics are divided at the local level in Audrain County. Republicans hold a majority of the elected positions in the county.

Audrain County, Missouri

Elected countywide officials
Assessor	Melissa Maupin	Democratic
Circuit Clerk	Penny J. Creed Craghead	Democratic
County Clerk	Lisa Smith	Republican
Collector	Amy LeCount	Republican
Commissioner (presiding)	Steve Hobbs	Republican
Commissioner (district 1)	Alan Winders	Republican
Commissioner (district 2)	Tracy Graham	Republican
Coroner	Todd Yager	Republican
Prosecuting Attorney	Jacob Shellabarger	Democratic
Public Administrator	Connie J. Hagan	Democratic
Recorder	Janis Deimeke	Republican
Sheriff	Matt Oller	Republican
Treasurer	Patty Meyers	Democratic

All three commissioners are Republicans, and among the other county-wide elected officials, the Collector of Revenue is the only officeholder who is not a Republican.

=== State ===
Past Gubernatorial Elections Results
Year	Republican	Democratic	Third Parties
2024	73.41% 7,622	23.92% 2,484	2.77% 277
2020	72.05% 7,643	25.10% 2,663	2.85% 302
2016	58.06% 5,831	38.20% 3,836	3.74% 376
2012	46.85% 4,633	49.77% 4,922	3.39% 335
2008	52.35% 5,612	46.18% 4,951	1.47% 158
2004	56.72% 6,047	42.1% 4,500	1.07% 115
2000	46.29% 4,576	51.45% 5,086	2.26% 223
1996	33.32% 3,254	64.40% 6,289	2.27% 222
1992	43.18% 4,504	56.82% 5,927	0.00% 0

All of Audrain County is currently included in Missouri's 43rd Legislative District and is currently represented by Kent Haden (R-Mexico) in the Missouri House of Representatives.

Missouri House of Representatives — District 43 — Audrain County (2020)
Party	Candidate	Votes	%	±%
Republican	Kent Haden	9,336	100.00%	+28.37

Missouri House of Representatives — District 43 — Audrain County (2018)
Party	Candidate	Votes	%	±%
Republican	Kent Haden	6,160	71.63%	−0.90
Democratic	Jamie Blair	2,440	28.37%	+0.90

All of Audrain County is a part of Missouri's 10th District in the Missouri Senate and is currently represented by Jeanie Riddle (R-Mokane).

Missouri Senate — District 10 — Audrain County (2018)
Party	Candidate	Votes	%	±%
Republican	Jeanie Riddle	5,701	65.89%	−6.43
Democratic	Ayanna Shivers	2,951	34.11%	+6.43

Missouri Senate — District 10 — Audrain County (2014)
Party	Candidate	Votes	%	±%
Republican	Jeanie Riddle	3,878	72.32%	
Democratic	Ed Schieffer	1,484	27.68%	

=== Federal ===
Most of Audrain County is included in Missouri's 4th Congressional District and is currently represented by Vicky Hartzler (R-Harrisonville) in the U.S. House of Representatives. Communities in Audrain County included in the 4th District include Mexico. Hartzler was elected to a sixth term in 2020 over Democratic challenger Lindsey Simmons.

U.S. House of Representatives — Missouri's 4th Congressional District — Audrain County (2020)
Party	Candidate	Votes	%	±%
Republican	Vicky Hartzler	6,064	72.82%	+2.40
Democratic	Lindsey Simmons	2,009	24.12%	−2.98
Libertarian	Steven K. Koonse	255	3.06%	+0.59

U.S. House of Representatives — Missouri’s 4th Congressional District — Audrain County (2018)
Party	Candidate	Votes	%	±%
Republican	Vicky Hartzler	4,867	70.42%	+0.31
Democratic	Renee Hoagenson	1,873	27.10%	+1.70
Libertarian	Mark Bliss	171	2.47%	−2.02

Some of Audrain County is included in Missouri's 6th Congressional District and is currently represented by Sam Graves (R-Tarkio) in the U.S. House of Representatives. Communities in Audrain County included in the 6th District include Farber, Laddonia, and Vandalia. Graves was elected to an eleventh term in 2020 over Democratic challenger Gena Ross.

U.S. House of Representatives – Missouri’s 6th Congressional District – Audrain County (2020)
Party	Candidate	Votes	%	±%
Republican	Sam Graves	1,628	77.23%	+4.54
Democratic	Gena L. Ross	428	20.30%	−4.61
Libertarian	Jim Higgins	52	2.47%	+0.07

U.S. House of Representatives – Missouri's 6th Congressional District – Audrain County (2018)
Party	Candidate	Votes	%	±%
Republican	Sam Graves	1,240	72.69%	+3.39
Democratic	Henry Robert Martin	425	24.91%	−2.11
Libertarian	Dan Hogan	41	2.40%	+0.18

Audrain County, along with the rest of the state of Missouri, is represented in the U.S. Senate by Josh Hawley (R-Columbia) and Roy Blunt (R-Strafford).

U.S. Senate – Class I – Audrain County (2018)
Party	Candidate	Votes	%	±%
Republican	Josh Hawley	5,651	64.72%	+19.73
Democratic	Claire McCaskill	2,727	31.23%	−16.00
Independent	Craig O'Dear	166	1.90%	
Libertarian	Japheth Campbell	135	1.55%	−6.24
Green	Jo Crain	52	0.60%	+0.60

Blunt was elected to a second term in 2016 over then-Missouri Secretary of State Jason Kander.

U.S. Senate — Class III — Audrain County (2016)
Party	Candidate	Votes	%	±%
Republican	Roy Blunt	5,726	57.26%	+12.27
Democratic	Jason Kander	3,680	36.80%	−10.43
Libertarian	Jonathan Dine	312	3.12%	−4.66
Green	Johnathan McFarland	163	1.63%	+1.63
Constitution	Fred Ryman	119	1.19%	+1.19

==== Political culture ====
United States presidential election results for Audrain County, Missouri
Year	Republican		Democratic		Third party(ies)	
Year	No.	%	No.	%	No.	%
1888	1,506	31.81%	3,152	66.58%	76	1.61%
1892	1,408	28.69%	3,240	66.01%	260	5.30%
1896	1,609	28.59%	3,984	70.79%	35	0.62%
1900	1,436	28.58%	3,477	69.21%	111	2.21%
1904	1,454	31.81%	3,006	65.76%	111	2.43%
1908	1,733	33.61%	3,350	64.97%	73	1.42%
1912	1,360	26.44%	3,332	64.79%	451	8.77%
1916	1,741	32.48%	3,572	66.63%	48	0.90%
1920	3,827	40.67%	5,514	58.60%	68	0.72%
1924	3,125	34.18%	5,866	64.17%	151	1.65%
1928	4,141	44.90%	5,067	54.94%	14	0.15%
1932	2,037	21.69%	7,301	77.74%	54	0.57%
1936	2,508	25.10%	7,455	74.59%	31	0.31%
1940	3,447	30.71%	7,768	69.21%	9	0.08%
1944	3,455	34.76%	6,471	65.11%	13	0.13%
1948	2,739	26.72%	7,495	73.12%	16	0.16%
1952	4,767	41.26%	6,775	58.64%	12	0.10%
1956	4,664	43.94%	5,951	56.06%	0	0.00%
1960	4,955	43.60%	6,410	56.40%	0	0.00%
1964	3,316	30.98%	7,387	69.02%	0	0.00%
1968	5,005	46.24%	4,806	44.41%	1,012	9.35%
1972	7,197	66.01%	3,706	33.99%	0	0.00%
1976	5,378	48.75%	5,600	50.76%	54	0.49%
1980	6,347	53.63%	5,168	43.67%	319	2.70%
1984	7,261	60.90%	4,662	39.10%	0	0.00%
1988	5,072	49.11%	5,226	50.61%	29	0.28%
1992	3,798	35.65%	4,731	44.41%	2,125	19.95%
1996	3,955	40.45%	4,690	47.96%	1,133	11.59%
2000	5,256	52.64%	4,551	45.58%	178	1.78%
2004	6,294	58.92%	4,318	40.42%	71	0.66%
2008	6,167	57.20%	4,434	41.13%	180	1.67%
2012	6,186	61.97%	3,539	35.45%	257	2.57%
2016	6,981	68.89%	2,570	25.36%	582	5.74%
2020	7,732	72.56%	2,704	25.38%	220	2.06%
2024	7,699	73.16%	2,688	25.54%	136	1.29%

At the presidential level, Audrain County has become solidly Republican in recent years. Audrain County strongly favored Donald Trump in both 2016 and 2020. Bill Clinton was the last Democratic presidential nominee to carry Audrain County in 1996 with a plurality of the vote, and a Democrat hasn't won majority support from the county's voters in a presidential election since Michael Dukakis in 1988.

Like most rural areas throughout Missouri, voters in Audrain County generally adhere to socially and culturally conservative principles which tend to influence their Republican leanings, at least on the state and national levels. Despite Audrain County's longstanding tradition of supporting socially conservative platforms, voters in the county have a penchant for advancing populist causes. In 2018, Missourians voted on a proposition (Proposition A) concerning right to work, the outcome of which ultimately reversed the right to work legislation passed in the state the previous year. 63.40% of Audrain County voters cast their ballots to overturn the law.

=== Missouri presidential preference primaries ===
==== 2020 ====
The 2020 presidential primaries for both the Democratic and Republican parties were held in Missouri on March 10. On the Democratic side, former Vice President Joe Biden (D-Delaware) both won statewide and carried Audrain County by a wide margin. Biden went on to defeat President Donald Trump in the general election.

Missouri Democratic Presidential Primary – Audrain County (2020)
Party	Candidate	Votes	%	±%
Democratic	Joe Biden	1,088	67.00	
Democratic	Bernie Sanders	426	26.23	
Democratic	Tulsi Gabbard	22	1.36	
Democratic	Others/Uncommitted	88	5.42	

Incumbent President Donald Trump (R-Florida) faced a primary challenge from former Massachusetts Governor Bill Weld, but won both Audrain County and statewide by large margins.

Missouri Republican Presidential Primary – Audrain County (2020)
Party	Candidate	Votes	%	±%
Republican	Donald Trump	1,426	97.67	
Republican	Bill Weld	8	0.55	
Republican	Others/Uncommitted	26	1.78	

==== 2016 ====
The 2016 presidential primaries for both the Republican and Democratic parties were held in Missouri on March 15. Businessman Donald Trump (R-New York) narrowly won the state overall, but Senator Ted Cruz (R-Texas) carried a plurality of the vote in Audrain County. Trump went on to win the nomination and the presidency.

Missouri Republican Presidential Primary – Audrain County (2016)
Party	Candidate	Votes	%	±%
Republican	Ted Cruz	1,642	40.77	
Republican	Donald Trump	1,611	40.00	
Republican	John Kasich	423	10.50	
Republican	Marco Rubio	229	5.69	
Republican	Others/Uncommitted	123	3.05	

On the Democratic side, former Secretary of State Hillary Clinton (D-New York) both won statewide and carried Audrain County by a small margin.

Missouri Democratic Presidential Primary – Audrain County (2016)
Party	Candidate	Votes	%	±%
Democratic	Hillary Clinton	749	49.64	
Democratic	Bernie Sanders	728	48.24	
Democratic	Others/Uncommitted	32	2.12	

==== 2012 ====
The 2012 Missouri Republican Presidential Primary's results were nonbinding on the state's national convention delegates. Voters in Audrain County supported former U.S. Senator Rick Santorum (R-Pennsylvania), who finished first in the state at large, but eventually lost the nomination to former Governor Mitt Romney (R-Massachusetts). Delegates to the congressional district and state conventions were chosen at a county caucus, which selected a delegation favoring Santorum. Incumbent President Barack Obama easily won the Missouri Democratic Primary and renomination. He defeated Romney in the general election.

==== 2008 ====
In 2008, the Missouri Republican Presidential Primary was closely contested, with Senator John McCain (R-Arizona) prevailing and eventually winning the nomination.

Missouri Republican Presidential Primary – Audrain County (2008)
Party	Candidate	Votes	%	±%
Republican	John McCain	744	33.24	
Republican	Mike Huckabee	709	31.68	
Republican	Mitt Romney	649	29.00	
Republican	Ron Paul	99	4.42	
Republican	Others/Uncommitted	37	1.66	

Then-Senator Hillary Clinton (D-New York) received more votes than any candidate from either party in Audrain County during the 2008 presidential primary. Despite initial reports that Clinton had won Missouri, Barack Obama (D-Illinois), also a Senator at the time, narrowly defeated her statewide and later became that year's Democratic nominee, going on to win the presidency.

Missouri Democratic Presidential Primary – Audrain County (2008)
Party	Candidate	Votes	%	±%
Democratic	Hillary Clinton	1,575	57.42	
Democratic	Barack Obama	1,079	39.34	
Democratic	Others/Uncommitted	89	3.24	

== See also ==
- National Register of Historic Places listings in Audrain County, Missouri
