= List of counties in Missouri =

Independent city and counties of Missouri
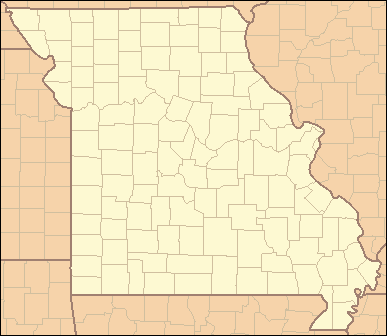
- Location: State of Missouri
- Number: 114 counties 1 independent city
- Populations: 1,914 (Worth) – 990,911 (St. Louis)
- Areas: 266 square miles (690 km^{2}) (Worth) – 1,179 square miles (3,050 km^{2}) (Texas)
- Government: County government
- Subdivisions: Cities, towns, unincorporated communities, census-designated places

There are 114 counties and one independent city in the U.S. state of Missouri. Following the Louisiana Purchase and the admittance of Louisiana into the United States in 1812, five counties were formed out of the Missouri Territory at the first general assembly: Cape Girardeau, New Madrid, Saint Charles, Saint Louis, and Ste. Genevieve. Most subsequent counties were apportioned from these five original counties. Six more counties were added through the 1836 Platte Purchase, the acquired lands of which formed the northwest tip of the state and consisted of Andrew, Atchison, Buchanan, Holt, Nodaway, and Platte counties.

In Missouri, the county level of government comes between those of the city and the state. Its primary responsibilities include maintaining roads, providing security, prosecuting criminals, and collecting taxes. Elected officials at this level include a sheriff, prosecuting attorney, and assessor.

Most of the counties in Missouri are named after politicians. One such county, Cass, was originally named Van Buren County after President Martin Van Buren, and was changed to its present name in support of Van Buren's Democratic opponent Lewis Cass during the presidential election of 1848. Other counties are named after war heroes, natural resources, explorers, and former U.S. territories.

The city of St. Louis is an independent city, and is not within the limits of a county. Its residents voted to secede from St. Louis County in 1876. Throughout the United States, St. Louis is one of three independent cities outside the state of Virginia (the other two are Baltimore, Maryland, and Carson City, Nevada).

Population figures are based on the 2025 Census estimate. According to that census estimate, the population of Missouri is 6,270,541, an increase of 1.9% from 2020. The average population of Missouri's counties is 54,526; St. Louis County is the most populous (990,911), and Worth County is the least (1,914). The average land area is 599 sq mi (1,550 km^{2}). The largest county is Texas County (1,179 sq mi, 3,054 km^{2}) and the smallest is St. Louis city (61.9 sq mi, 160 km^{2}).

The Federal Information Processing Standard (FIPS) is used by the U.S. government to uniquely identify counties, and is provided for each entry. These codes link to the United States Census Bureau's "quick facts" for each county. To distinguish from counties in other states, one must use Missouri's FIPS code, 29. For example, Adair County's unique nationwide identifier is 29001.

== Counties ==
County	FIPS code	County seat	Est.	Formed from	Etymology	Population	Area	Map
Adair County	001	Kirksville	January 29, 1841	Macon County	John Adair (1757–1840), pioneer, soldier, and seventh Governor of Kentucky	25,684	568 sq mi (1,471 km^{2})	A state map highlighting Adair County in the northern part of the state.
Andrew County	003	Savannah	January 29, 1841	Part of the Platte Purchase	Andrew Jackson Davis, a prominent citizen of St. Louis	18,241	435 sq mi (1,127 km^{2})	A state map highlighting Andrew County in the northwestern part of the state.
Atchison County	005	Rock Port	February 24, 1843	Holt County, part of the Platte Purchase	U.S. Senator David Rice Atchison (1807–1886), a Democrat from Missouri	5,175	545 sq mi (1,412 km^{2})	A state map highlighting Atchison County in the northwestern corner of the state.
Audrain County	007	Mexico	January 12, 1831	Callaway, Monroe and Ralls counties	James Hunter Audrain, a War of 1812 colonel Missouri State Legislator	24,528	693 sq mi (1,795 km^{2})	A state map highlighting Audrain County in the northeastern part of the state.
Barry County	009	Cassville	January 5, 1835	Greene County	William Taylor Barry (1784–1835), jurist and United States Postmaster General	36,200	779 sq mi (2,018 km^{2})	A state map highlighting Barry County in the southwestern part of the state.
Barton County	011	Lamar	December 12, 1855	Jasper County	U.S. Senator David Barton (1783–1837), one of the first senators from Missouri	11,795	594 sq mi (1,538 km^{2})	A state map highlighting Barton County in the southwestern part of the state.
Bates County	013	Butler	January 16, 1833	Van Buren (now Cass) County	Frederick Bates (1777–1825), the second governor of Missouri	16,512	848 sq mi (2,196 km^{2})	A state map highlighting Bates County in the western part of the state.
Benton County	015	Warsaw	January 3, 1835	Pettis and Greene counties	Thomas Hart Benton (1782–1858), U.S. Senator from Missouri	20,536	706 sq mi (1,829 km^{2})	A state map highlighting Benton County in the western part of the state.
Bollinger County	017	Marble Hill	March 1, 1851	Cape Girardeau, Madison, Stoddard and Wayne counties	George Frederick Bollinger (1770–1842), early settler of Missouri	10,646	621 sq mi (1,608 km^{2})	A state map highlighting Bollinger County in the southeastern part of the state.
Boone County	019	Columbia	January 1, 1821	Howard County	Daniel Boone (1734–1820), American pioneer and hunter	191,746	685 sq mi (1,774 km^{2})	A state map highlighting Boone County in the middle part of the state.
Buchanan County	021	Saint Joseph	December 31, 1838	Part of the Platte Purchase	James Buchanan (1791–1868), 15th President of the United States	83,540	410 sq mi (1,062 km^{2})	A state map highlighting Buchanan County in the northwestern part of the state.
Butler County	023	Poplar Bluff	February 27, 1849	Wayne County	William O. Butler (1791–1880), U.S. Representative from Kentucky and vice-presidential nominee under Lewis Cass	41,904	698 sq mi (1,808 km^{2})	A state map highlighting Butler County in the southeastern part of the state.
Caldwell County	025	Kingston	December 29, 1836	Ray County	Disputed; either John Caldwell, an Indian scout and friend of respected Colonel Alexander William Doniphan; John Caldwell, Lieutenant Governor of Kentucky; or Mathew Caldwell, a signer of the Texas Declaration of Independence	9,012	429 sq mi (1,111 km^{2})	A state map highlighting Caldwell County in the northwestern part of the state.
Callaway County	027	Fulton	January 1, 1821	Boone, Howard and Montgomery counties	James Callaway (1783–1815), soldier during the War of 1812 and grandson of Daniel Boone	45,765	839 sq mi (2,173 km^{2})	A state map highlighting Callaway County in the middle part of the state.
Camden County	029	Camdenton	January 29, 1841	Benton, Morgan and Pulaski counties	Charles Pratt, 1st Earl Camden (1714–1794), an English lawyer, judge, Whig politician, and proponent of civil liberties	44,047	655 sq mi (1,696 km^{2})	A state map highlighting Camden County in the middle part of the state.
Cape Girardeau County	031	Jackson	October 1, 1804	One of the five original counties	A rock promontory over the Mississippi River and Ensign Sieur Jean Baptiste de Girardot, a French officer and early explorer of the region	83,999	579 sq mi (1,500 km^{2})	A state map highlighting Cape Girardeau County in the southeastern part of the state.
Carroll County	033	Carrollton	January 2, 1833	Ray County	Charles Carroll (1737–1832), delegate to the Continental Congress and U.S. Senator for Maryland	8,417	695 sq mi (1,800 km^{2})	A state map highlighting Carroll County in the northwestern part of the state.
Carter County	035	Van Buren	March 10, 1859	Oregon, Reynolds, Ripley and Shannon counties	Zimri Carter (1794–1872), a pioneering settler	5,418	508 sq mi (1,316 km^{2})	A state map highlighting Carter County in the southeastern part of the state.
Cass County	037	Harrisonville	January 16, 1833	Jackson County	Lewis Cass (1782–1866), senator from Michigan	115,859	699 sq mi (1,810 km^{2})	A state map highlighting Cass County in the western part of the state.
Cedar County	039	Stockton	February 14, 1845	Dade and St. Clair counties	Named for the abundance of Eastern Red Cedar trees	14,888	476 sq mi (1,233 km^{2})	A state map highlighting Cedar County in the southwestern part of the state.
Chariton County	041	Keytesville	January 1, 1821	Howard County	Chariton River, a tributary of the Missouri River, whose naming origin is disputed	7,377	756 sq mi (1,958 km^{2})	A state map highlighting Chariton County in the northern part of the state.
Christian County	043	Ozark	March 8, 1859	Greene, Taney and Webster counties	William Christian (1743–1786), colonel in the American Revolution	96,725	563 sq mi (1,458 km^{2})	A state map highlighting Christian County in the southwestern part of the state.
Clark County	045	Kahoka	December 16, 1836	Lewis County	William Clark (1770–1838), American explorer, soldier, Indian agent, and territorial governor	6,475	507 sq mi (1,313 km^{2})	A state map highlighting Clark County in the northeastern corner of the state.
Clay County	047	Liberty	January 2, 1822	Ray County	Henry Clay (1777–1852), American Senator and orator from Kentucky	265,032	396 sq mi (1,026 km^{2})	A state map highlighting Clay County in the northwestern part of the state.
Clinton County	049	Plattsburg	January 2, 1833	Clay County	George Clinton (1739–1812), soldier and Governor of New York, considered one of the Founding Fathers of the United States	21,661	419 sq mi (1,085 km^{2})	A state map highlighting Clinton County in the northwestern part of the state.
Cole County	051	Jefferson City	January 1, 1821	Cooper County	Stephen Cole, pioneering settler	77,908	392 sq mi (1,015 km^{2})	A state map highlighting Cole County in the middle part of the state.
Cooper County	053	Boonville	February 1, 1819	Howard County	Sarshel Benjamin Cooper, pioneering settler	17,136	565 sq mi (1,463 km^{2})	A state map highlighting Cooper County in the middle part of the state.
Crawford County	055	Steelville	January 23, 1829	Gasconade County	William H. Crawford (1772–1834), U.S. Senator from Georgia, U.S. Secretary of Treasury, and judge	22,929	743 sq mi (1,924 km^{2})	A state map highlighting Crawford County in the southeastern part of the state.
Dade County	057	Greenfield	January 29, 1841	Barry and Polk counties	Major Francis L. Dade (1793?–1835), Major in the U.S. 4th Infantry Regiment, United States Army, during the Second Seminole War	7,804	490 sq mi (1,269 km^{2})	A state map highlighting Dade County in the southwestern part of the state.
Dallas County	059	Buffalo	January 29, 1841	Polk County	George M. Dallas (1792–1864), U.S. Vice President under James K. Polk	18,025	542 sq mi (1,404 km^{2})	A state map highlighting Dallas County in the southwestern part of the state.
Daviess County	061	Gallatin	December 29, 1836	Ray County	Joseph Hamilton Daveiss (1774–1811), commanded the Dragoons of the Indiana Militia at the Battle of Tippecanoe	8,558	567 sq mi (1,469 km^{2})	A state map highlighting Daviess County in the northwestern part of the state.
DeKalb County	063	Maysville	January 5, 1843	Clinton County	Johann de Kalb (1721–1780), a German soldier who served as a major general in the Continental Army during the American Revolutionary War	9,795	424 sq mi (1,098 km^{2})	A state map highlighting DeKalb County in the northwestern part of the state.
Dent County	065	Salem	February 10, 1851	Crawford and Shannon counties	James Dent, pioneering settler	14,584	754 sq mi (1,953 km^{2})	A state map highlighting Dent County in the southeastern part of the state.
Douglas County	067	Ava	October 29, 1857	Ozark County	Stephen A. Douglas (1813–1861), American Senator from Illinois, and the Democratic nominee for President in 1860	12,342	815 sq mi (2,111 km^{2})	A state map highlighting Douglas County in the southern part of the state.
Dunklin County	069	Kennett	February 27, 1843	Stoddard County	Daniel Dunklin (1790–1844), fifth governor of Missouri	26,855	546 sq mi (1,414 km^{2})	A state map highlighting Dunklin County in the southeastern part of the state.
Franklin County	071	Union	January 1, 1819	St. Louis County	Benjamin Franklin (1706–1790), writer, publisher, orator, and one of the Founding Fathers of the United States	108,090	922 sq mi (2,388 km^{2})	A state map highlighting Franklin County in the eastern part of the state.
Gasconade County	073	Hermann	January 1, 1821	Franklin County	Gasconade River, a tributary of the Missouri River; the river probably derives its name from the French word "gascon" which means braggart, and could be an old satirical name describing those who boast about their adventures upon return to St. Louis	14,784	520 sq mi (1,347 km^{2})	A state map highlighting Gasconade County in the eastern part of the state.
Gentry County	075	Albany	February 12, 1841	Clinton County	Richard Gentry (1788–1837), a distinguished American military colonel in the Seminole Wars	6,384	492 sq mi (1,274 km^{2})	A state map highlighting Gentry County in the northwestern part of the state.
Greene County	077	Springfield	January 2, 1833	Crawford and Wayne counties	Nathanael Greene (1742–1786), a major general of the Continental Army in the American Revolutionary War	309,286	675 sq mi (1,748 km^{2})	A state map highlighting Greene County in the southwestern part of the state.
Grundy County	079	Trenton	February 12, 1839	Livingston County	Felix Grundy (1777–1840), U.S. Congressman and U.S. Senator from Tennessee who also served as the 13th Attorney General of the United States	9,744	436 sq mi (1,129 km^{2})	A state map highlighting Grundy County in the northwestern part of the state.
Harrison County	081	Bethany	February 22, 1843	Daviess County	Albert G. Harrison (1800–1839), U.S. Representative from Missouri	8,281	725 sq mi (1,878 km^{2})	A state map highlighting Harrison County in the northwestern part of the state.
Henry County	083	Clinton	December 13, 1834	Lillard (now Lafayette) County	Patrick Henry (1736–1799), first post-colonial Governor of Virginia and prominent figure in the American Revolution	22,671	702 sq mi (1,818 km^{2})	A state map highlighting Henry County in the western part of the state.
Hickory County	085	Hermitage	February 14, 1845	Benton and Polk counties	Andrew Jackson (1767–1845), seventh U.S. President, who was nicknamed "Old Hickory" during his military service	9,044	399 sq mi (1,033 km^{2})	A state map highlighting Hickory County in the southwestern part of the state.
Holt County	087	Oregon	February 15, 1841	Part of the Platte Purchase	David Rice Holt, Missouri State Representative	4,200	462 sq mi (1,197 km^{2})	A state map highlighting Holt County in the northwestern part of the state.
Howard County	089	Fayette	March 1, 1816	St. Charles and St. Louis counties	Benjamin Howard (1760–1814), a Congressman from Kentucky, governor of Missouri Territory and a brigadier general in the War of 1812	10,180	466 sq mi (1,207 km^{2})	A state map highlighting Howard County in the middle part of the state.
Howell County	091	West Plains	March 2, 1857	Oregon County	Disputed – Josiah Howell, pioneering settler	40,798	928 sq mi (2,404 km^{2})	A state map highlighting Howell County in the southern part of the state.
Iron County	093	Ironton	February 17, 1857	Madison, Reynolds, St. Francois, Washington and Wayne counties	The abundance of iron ore in the area	9,318	551 sq mi (1,427 km^{2})	A state map highlighting Iron County in the southeastern part of the state.
Jackson County	095	Independence, Kansas City	February 16, 1825	Lillard (now Lafayette) County	Andrew Jackson (1767–1845), U.S. Senator from Tennessee and later 7th President of the United States from 1829 to 1837	732,994	605 sq mi (1,567 km^{2})	A state map highlighting Jackson County in the northwestern part of the state.
Jasper County	097	Carthage	January 29, 1841	Barry County	William Jasper (c. 1750–1779), a noted American soldier in the Revolutionary War	127,428	640 sq mi (1,658 km^{2})	A state map highlighting Jasper County in the southwestern part of the state.
Jefferson County	099	Hillsboro	January 1, 1819	St. Louis and Sainte Genevieve counties	Thomas Jefferson (1743–1826), third President of the United States, principal author of the Declaration of Independence, and one of the most influential Founding Fathers	233,132	657 sq mi (1,702 km^{2})	A state map highlighting Jefferson County in the eastern part of the state.
Johnson County	101	Warrensburg	December 13, 1834	Lillard (now Lafayette) County	Richard M. Johnson (1780–1850), ninth Vice President of the United States, serving in the administration of Martin Van Buren	56,670	831 sq mi (2,152 km^{2})	A state map highlighting Johnson County in the western part of the state.
Knox County	103	Edina	January 6, 1843	Scotland County	Henry Knox (1750–1806) an American bookseller from Boston who became the chief artillery officer of the Continental Army and later the nation's first Secretary of War	3,728	506 sq mi (1,311 km^{2})	A state map highlighting Knox County in the northeastern part of the state.
Laclede County	105	Lebanon	February 24, 1849	Camden, Pulaski and Wright counties	Pierre Laclede (1729–1778), founder of St. Louis, Missouri	36,943	766 sq mi (1,984 km^{2})	A state map highlighting Laclede County in the southern part of the state.
Lafayette County	107	Lexington	February 16, 1825	Cooper County	Gilbert du Motier, the Marquis de Lafayette (1757–1834), French military officer and general in the American Revolutionary War	33,531	629 sq mi (1,629 km^{2})	A state map highlighting Lafayette County in the northwestern part of the state.
Lawrence County	109	Mount Vernon	February 24, 1843	Barry and Dade counties	James Lawrence (1781–1813), an American naval officer best known for his last words "Don't give up the ship!"	39,401	613 sq mi (1,588 km^{2})	A state map highlighting Lawrence County in the southwestern part of the state.
Lewis County	111	Monticello	January 2, 1833	Marion County	Meriwether Lewis (1774–1809), explorer and governor of the Louisiana Territory	9,879	505 sq mi (1,308 km^{2})	A state map highlighting Lewis County in the northeastern part of the state.
Lincoln County	113	Troy	January 1, 1819	St. Charles County	Disputed; either Lincoln County, Kentucky (birthplace of Christopher Clark, a Missouri legislator who advocated for the county's creation), or for Benjamin Lincoln (1733–1810), an American revolutionary war general	66,676	630 sq mi (1,632 km^{2})	A state map highlighting Lincoln County in the eastern part of the state.
Linn County	115	Linneus	January 6, 1837	Chariton County	Lewis F. Linn (1796–1843), a Jacksonian Democratic U.S. Senator for Missouri	11,815	620 sq mi (1,606 km^{2})	A state map highlighting Linn County in the northern part of the state.
Livingston County	117	Chillicothe	January 6, 1837	Carroll County	Edward Livingston (1764–1836), a prominent American jurist and statesman, influential in the drafting of the Louisiana Civil Code of 1825, a civil code based largely on the Napoleonic Code	14,708	535 sq mi (1,386 km^{2})	A state map highlighting Livingston County in the northwestern part of the state.
Macon County	121	Macon	January 6, 1837	Chariton and Randolph counties	Nathaniel Macon (1758–1837), member of the United States House of Representatives from 1791 to 1815 who briefly served in the American Revolutionary War	15,190	804 sq mi (2,082 km^{2})	A state map highlighting Macon County in the northern part of the state.
Madison County	123	Fredericktown	January 1, 1819	Cape Girardeau and Sainte Genevieve counties	James Madison (1751–1836), politician and political philosopher who served as the fourth President of the United States, and one of the Founding Fathers of the United States	12,858	497 sq mi (1,287 km^{2})	A state map highlighting Madison County in the southeastern part of the state.
Maries County	125	Vienna	March 2, 1855	Osage and Pulaski counties	Maries River, possibly a corruption of the French word marais meaning "marsh" or "swamp"	8,397	528 sq mi (1,368 km^{2})	A state map highlighting Maries County in the middle part of the state.
Marion County	127	Palmyra	December 14, 1822	Ralls County	Francis Marion (1732–1795), a military officer who served in the American Revolutionary War	28,525	438 sq mi (1,134 km^{2})	A state map highlighting Marion County in the northeastern part of the state.
McDonald County	119	Pineville	January 1, 1847	Newton County	Alexander McDonald, American Revolutionary War sergeant	23,992	540 sq mi (1,399 km^{2})	A state map highlighting McDonald County in the southwestern corner of the state.
Mercer County	129	Princeton	February 22, 1843	Grundy County	John F. Mercer (1759–1821), an American lawyer, planter, and Governor of Maryland	3,404	454 sq mi (1,176 km^{2})	A state map highlighting Mercer County in the northwestern part of the state.
Miller County	131	Tuscumbia	February 6, 1837	Cole and Pulaski counties	John Miller (1781–1846), an American publisher and politician from St. Louis, Missouri. He was the fourth Governor of Missouri and represented Missouri in the U.S. House	25,817	592 sq mi (1,533 km^{2})	A state map highlighting Miller County in the middle part of the state.
Mississippi County	133	Charleston	December 19, 1842	Scott County	Mississippi River, the second-longest river in the United States which forms Missouri's eastern border	12,003	413 sq mi (1,070 km^{2})	A state map highlighting Mississippi County in the southeastern part of the state.
Moniteau County	135	California	February 14, 1845	Cole and Morgan counties	Moniteau Creek; "moniteau" is a French spelling of manitou, the Algonquian Great Spirit	15,428	417 sq mi (1,080 km^{2})	A state map highlighting Moniteau County in the middle part of the state.
Monroe County	137	Paris	January 6, 1831	Ralls County	James Monroe (1758–1831), fifth President of the United States who crafted the Missouri Compromise	8,959	646 sq mi (1,673 km^{2})	A state map highlighting Monroe County in the northeastern part of the state.
Montgomery County	139	Montgomery City	January 1, 1819	St. Charles County	Richard Montgomery (1738–1775), an Irish-born soldier who first served in the British Army and later became a brigadier-general in the Continental Army during the Revolutionary War	11,590	539 sq mi (1,396 km^{2})	A state map highlighting Montgomery County in the eastern part of the state.
Morgan County	141	Versailles	January 5, 1833	Cooper County	Daniel Morgan (c. 1736–1802), American pioneer, soldier, and United States Representative from Virginia	22,418	598 sq mi (1,549 km^{2})	A state map highlighting Morgan County in the middle part of the state.
New Madrid County	143	New Madrid	October 1, 1804	One of the five original counties	Madrid, Spain	15,086	678 sq mi (1,756 km^{2})	A state map highlighting New Madrid County in the southeastern part of the state.
Newton County	145	Neosho	December 31, 1838	Barry County	John Newton (1755–1780), legendary soldier of the American Revolution	62,263	626 sq mi (1,621 km^{2})	A state map highlighting Newton County in the southwestern part of the state.
Nodaway County	147	Maryville	January 2, 1843	Andrew County, the Platte Purchase	Nodaway River, a 120-mile (190 km) long river in southwest Iowa and northwest Missouri	20,174	877 sq mi (2,271 km^{2})	A state map highlighting Nodaway County in the northwestern part of the state.
Oregon County	149	Alton	February 15, 1841	Ripley County	Oregon Territory	8,709	792 sq mi (2,051 km^{2})	A state map highlighting Oregon County in the southern part of the state.
Osage County	151	Linn	January 29, 1841	Gasconade County	Osage River, a 360 miles (580 km) long tributary of the Missouri River in central Missouri; the name of the river is probably derived from a French corruption of "Washazhe" – the name of the Osage Native Americans	13,611	606 sq mi (1,570 km^{2})	A state map highlighting Osage County in the middle part of the state.
Ozark County	153	Gainesville	January 29, 1841	Taney County	Ozark Mountains – Ozark is the anglicized form of the French "aux arcs", an abbreviation of "Aux Arkansas", which means in the county of Arkansas	9,172	747 sq mi (1,935 km^{2})	A state map highlighting Ozark County in the southern part of the state.
Pemiscot County	155	Caruthersville	February 19, 1851	New Madrid County	An American Indian word meaning "liquid mud"	14,465	493 sq mi (1,277 km^{2})	A state map highlighting Pemiscot County in the southeastern corner of the state.
Perry County	157	Perryville	January 1, 1821	Sainte Genevieve County	Oliver Hazard Perry (1785–1819), naval officer in the War of 1812 against Britain, earned the title "Hero of Lake Erie" for leading American forces in a decisive naval victory at the Battle of Lake Erie	19,093	475 sq mi (1,230 km^{2})	A state map highlighting Perry County in the southeastern part of the state.
Pettis County	159	Sedalia	January 26, 1833	Cooper and Saline counties	Spencer Darwin Pettis (1802–1831), U.S. Representative from Missouri	44,254	685 sq mi (1,774 km^{2})	A state map highlighting Pettis County in the western part of the state.
Phelps County	161	Rolla	November 13, 1857	Crawford County	John S. Phelps (1814–1886), a politician, soldier during the American Civil War, and twenty-third Governor of Missouri	45,247	673 sq mi (1,743 km^{2})	A state map highlighting Phelps County in the middle part of the state.
Pike County	163	Bowling Green	February 1, 1819	St. Charles County	Zebulon Pike (1778–1813), American soldier and explorer for whom Pikes Peak in Colorado is also named	17,955	673 sq mi (1,743 km^{2})	A state map highlighting Pike County in the northeastern part of the state.
Platte County	165	Platte City	December 31, 1838	Part of the Platte Purchase	Platte River, a tributary of the Missouri River, which is in turn named for the French word "platte" meaning flat or shallow	114,400	420 sq mi (1,088 km^{2})	A state map highlighting Platte County in the northwestern part of the state.
Polk County	167	Bolivar	January 5, 1835	Greene County	James K. Polk (1795–1849), 11th President of the United States	33,604	637 sq mi (1,650 km^{2})	A state map highlighting Polk County in the southwestern part of the state.
Pulaski County	169	Waynesville	January 19, 1833	Crawford County	Kazimierz Pulaski (1745–1779), Polish soldier of fortune in the American Revolutionary War, he saved the life of George Washington and became a general in the Continental Army	54,442	547 sq mi (1,417 km^{2})	A state map highlighting Pulaski County in the middle part of the state.
Putnam County	171	Unionville	February 21, 1843	Adair and Sullivan counties	Israel Putnam (1718–1790), an American army general who fought with distinction at the Battle of Bunker Hill during the American Revolutionary War	4,546	518 sq mi (1,342 km^{2})	A state map highlighting Putnam County in the northern part of the state.
Ralls County	173	New London	January 1, 1821	Pike County	Daniel Ralls, a Missouri State Representative	10,444	471 sq mi (1,220 km^{2})	A state map highlighting Ralls County in the northeastern part of the state.
Randolph County	175	Huntsville	January 22, 1829	Chariton and Ralls counties	John Randolph of Roanoke (1773–1833), a leader in Congress from Virginia and spokesman for the "Old Republican"	24,513	482 sq mi (1,248 km^{2})	A state map highlighting Randolph County in the northern part of the state.
Ray County	177	Richmond	January 1, 1821	Howard County	John Ray, Missouri State Representative	23,398	570 sq mi (1,476 km^{2})	A state map highlighting Ray County in the northwestern part of the state.
Reynolds County	179	Centerville	February 25, 1845	Shannon County	Thomas Reynolds (1796–1844), governor of Missouri from 1840 to 1844	5,992	811 sq mi (2,100 km^{2})	A state map highlighting Reynolds County in the southeastern part of the state.
Ripley County	181	Doniphan	January 12, 1831	Wayne County	Eleazer Wheelock Ripley (1782–1839), Brigadier General in the War of 1812	10,717	630 sq mi (1,632 km^{2})	A state map highlighting Ripley County in the southeastern part of the state.
St. Charles County	183	Saint Charles	October 1, 1804	One of the five original counties	St. Charles Borromeo (1538–1584), an Italian saint and cardinal of the Roman Catholic Church	426,499	561 sq mi (1,453 km^{2})	A state map highlighting Saint Charles County in the eastern part of the state.
St. Clair County	185	Osceola	January 16, 1833	Rives (now Henry) County	Arthur St. Clair (1737–1818), an American soldier and Governor of the Northwest Territory	9,976	677 sq mi (1,753 km^{2})	A state map highlighting Saint Clair County in the western part of the state.
Ste. Genevieve County	186	Ste. Genevieve	October 1, 1804	One of the five original counties	St. Genevieve (c. 420 – c. 510), the patron saint of Paris in Roman Catholic and Eastern Orthodox tradition	18,689	502 sq mi (1,300 km^{2})	A state map highlighting Sainte Genevieve County in the southeastern part of the state.
Saint Francois County	187	Farmington	December 19, 1821	Jefferson, Ste. Genevieve and Washington counties	St. Francis of Assisi (c. 1182–1226), a Catholic deacon and the founder of the Order of Friars Minor, more commonly known as the Franciscans	67,809	450 sq mi (1,165 km^{2})	A state map highlighting Saint Francois County in the southeastern part of the state.
Saint Louis County	189	Clayton	October 1, 1804	One of the five original counties	King Louis IX (1214–1270), King of France from 1226 until his death	990,911	508 sq mi (1,316 km^{2})	A state map highlighting Saint Louis County in the eastern part of the state.
Saint Louis City	510	St. Louis	October 22, 1876	Created in 1876 when city residents voted to secede from St. Louis County	King Louis IX (1214–1270), King of France from 1226 until his death	278,144	61.9 sq mi (160 km^{2})	A state map highlighting Saint Louis City in the eastern part of the state.
Saline County	195	Marshall	January 1, 1821	Cooper County	Local hot springs	23,265	756 sq mi (1,958 km^{2})	A state map highlighting Saline County in the northwestern part of the state.
Schuyler County	197	Lancaster	February 17, 1843	Adair County	Philip Schuyler (1733–1804), a general in the American Revolution and a United States Senator from New York	4,140	308 sq mi (798 km^{2})	A state map highlighting Schuyler County in the northern part of the state.
Scotland County	199	Memphis	January 29, 1841	Clark, Lewis, and Shelby counties	Scotland (country)	4,796	438 sq mi (1,134 km^{2})	A state map highlighting Scotland County in the northeastern part of the state.
Scott County	201	Benton	March 1, 1822	New Madrid County	John Guier Scott (1819–1892), a U.S. Representative from Missouri	37,975	421 sq mi (1,090 km^{2})	A state map highlighting Scott County in the southeastern part of the state.
Shannon County	203	Eminence	January 14, 1837	Ripley County	George Shannon (1785–1836), member of the Lewis and Clark Expedition	7,285	1,004 sq mi (2,600 km^{2})	A state map highlighting Shannon County in the southern part of the state.
Shelby County	205	Shelbyville	January 2, 1835	Marion County	Isaac Shelby (1750–1826), the first and fifth Governor of Kentucky	5,870	501 sq mi (1,298 km^{2})	A state map highlighting Shelby County in the northeastern part of the state.
Stoddard County	207	Bloomfield	January 16, 1829	New Madrid County	Amos Stoddard (1762–1813), the only commandant of Upper Louisiana for the French Republic and the only commandant for the District of Louisiana for the United States in 1804 during the handover of the Louisiana Purchase	28,284	827 sq mi (2,142 km^{2})	A state map highlighting Stoddard County in the southeastern part of the state.
Stone County	209	Galena	February 10, 1851	Taney County	William Stone, first elected judge of Taney County	32,503	463 sq mi (1,199 km^{2})	A state map highlighting Stone County in the southwestern part of the state.
Sullivan County	211	Milan	February 17, 1843	Linn County	John Sullivan (1740–1795), American Revolutionary War general	5,738	651 sq mi (1,686 km^{2})	A state map highlighting Sullivan County in the northern part of the state.
Taney County	213	Forsyth	March 19, 1835	Greene County	Roger Brooke Taney (1777–1864), eleventh United States Attorney General and fifth Chief Justice of the United States	57,001	632 sq mi (1,637 km^{2})	A state map highlighting Taney County in the southwestern part of the state.
Texas County	215	Houston	February 17, 1843	Shannon and Wright counties	Republic of Texas	25,994	1,179 sq mi (3,054 km^{2})	A state map highlighting Texas County in the southern part of the state.
Vernon County	217	Nevada	February 27, 1855	Bates County	Miles Vernon, Missouri State Senator – the county was originally defined as having the same boundaries as Bates county, but was later declared unconstitutional and changed	19,946	834 sq mi (2,160 km^{2})	A state map highlighting Vernon County in the southwestern part of the state.
Warren County	219	Warrenton	January 5, 1833	Montgomery County	Joseph Warren (1741–1775), Revolutionary War doctor and general	39,016	432 sq mi (1,119 km^{2})	A state map highlighting Warren County in the eastern part of the state.
Washington County	221	Potosi	November 1, 1813	Sainte Genevieve County	George Washington (1732–1799), commander of the Continental Army in the American Revolutionary War and first President of the United States	23,810	760 sq mi (1,968 km^{2})	A state map highlighting Washington County in the southeastern part of the state.
Wayne County	223	Greenville	February 1, 1819	Cape Girardeau and Lawrence counties	Anthony Wayne (1745–1796), United States Army general and statesman	10,782	761 sq mi (1,971 km^{2})	A state map highlighting Wayne County in the southeastern part of the state.
Webster County	225	Marshfield	March 3, 1855	Greene County	Daniel Webster (1782–1852), U.S. Secretary of State and Senator from Massachusetts	43,054	593 sq mi (1,536 km^{2})	A state map highlighting Webster County in the southwestern part of the state.
Worth County	227	Grant City	February 25, 1861	Gentry County	William J. Worth (1794–1849), a United States general during the Mexican–American War	1,914	266 sq mi (689 km^{2})	A state map highlighting Worth County in the northwestern part of the state.
Wright County	229	Hartville	January 29, 1841	Pulaski County	Silas Wright (1795–1847), an American Democratic politician and Governor of New York	19,671	682 sq mi (1,766 km^{2})	A state map highlighting Wright County in the southern part of the state.

== Racial / Ethnic Profile of counties in Missouri (2020 Census) ==
Racial / Ethnic Profile of counties in Missouri (2020 Census)
Following is a table of counties in Missouri by race/ethnicity. The majority racial/ethnic group is coded per the key below.

Majority minority with no dominant group
Majority White
Majority Black
Majority Hispanic
Majority Asian
Majority Native American

Racial and ethnic composition of counties in Missouri (2020 Census) (NH = Non-Hispanic) Note: the US Census treats Hispanic/Latino as an ethnic category. This table excludes Latinos from the racial categories and assigns them to a separate category. Hispanics/Latinos may be of any race.
County	Location of County	Total Population	White alone (NH)	%	Black or African American alone (NH)	%	Native American or Alaska Native alone (NH)	%	Asian alone (NH)	%	Pacific Islander alone (NH)	%	Other race alone (NH)	%	Mixed race or Multiracial (NH)	%	Hispanic or Latino (any race)	%
Jackson		717,204	419,542	58.50%	156,542	21.83%	2,713	0.38%	14,981	2.09%	1,727	0.24%	3,083	0.43%	40,831	5.69%	77,785	10.85%
Jasper		122,761	96,388	78.52%	2,260	1.84%	1,894	1.54%	1,491	1.21%	440	0.36%	388	0.32%	8,523	6.94%	11,377	9.27%
Jefferson		226,739	203,287	89.66%	2,295	1.01%	617	0.27%	1,839	0.81%	71	0.03%	622	0.27%	12,456	5.49%	5,552	2.45%
Johnson		54,013	44,415	82.23%	2,309	4.27%	259	0.48%	821	1.52%	210	0.39%	203	0.38%	3,201	5.93%	2,595	4.80%
Knox		3,744	3,573	95.43%	20	0.53%	5	0.13%	18	0.48%	0	0.00%	6	0.16%	99	2.64%	23	0.61%
Laclede		36,039	32,482	90.13%	262	0.73%	197	0.55%	190	0.53%	17	0.05%	71	0.20%	1,865	5.17%	955	2.65%
Lafayette		32,984	29,256	88.70%	671	2.03%	138	0.42%	115	0.35%	12	0.04%	58	0.18%	1,687	5.11%	1,047	3.17%
Lawrence		38,001	32,401	85.26%	134	0.35%	333	0.88%	171	0.45%	40	0.11%	91	0.24%	1,844	4.85%	2,987	7.86%
Lewis		10,032	9,315	92.85%	185	1.84%	30	0.30%	22	0.22%	0	0.00%	10	0.10%	305	3.04%	165	1.64%
Lincoln		59,574	53,051	89.05%	1,072	1.80%	193	0.32%	235	0.39%	27	0.05%	177	0.30%	3,278	5.50%	1,541	2.59%
Linn		11,874	11,027	92.87%	67	0.56%	31	0.26%	22	0.19%	6	0.05%	25	0.21%	407	3.43%	289	2.43%
Livingston		14,557	13,368	91.83%	315	2.16%	47	0.32%	87	0.60%	5	0.03%	19	0.13%	477	3.28%	239	1.64%
McDonald		23,303	16,667	71.52%	421	1.81%	493	2.12%	376	1.61%	868	3.72%	82	0.35%	1,578	6.77%	2,818	12.09%
Macon		15,209	13,778	90.59%	299	1.97%	25	0.16%	84	0.55%	4	0.03%	37	0.24%	706	4.64%	276	1.81%
Madison		12,626	11,555	91.52%	54	0.43%	49	0.39%	41	0.32%	0	0.00%	22	0.17%	563	4.46%	342	2.71%
Maries		8,432	7,796	92.46%	23	0.27%	42	0.50%	7	0.08%	0	0.00%	16	0.19%	414	4.91%	134	1.59%
Marion		28,525	24,930	87.40%	1,363	4.78%	67	0.23%	165	0.58%	16	0.06%	96	0.34%	1,372	4.81%	516	1.81%
Mercer		3,538	3,291	93.02%	0	0.00%	8	0.23%	0	0.00%	0	0.00%	7	0.20%	77	2.18%	155	4.38%
Miller		24,722	22,908	92.66%	117	0.47%	113	0.46%	64	0.26%	24	0.10%	45	0.18%	985	3.98%	466	1.88%
Mississippi		12,577	8,814	70.08%	3,060	24.33%	33	0.26%	20	0.16%	0	0.00%	52	0.41%	375	2.98%	223	1.77%
Moniteau		15,473	13,688	88.46%	282	1.82%	40	0.26%	42	0.27%	16	0.10%	27	0.17%	514	3.32%	864	5.58%
Monroe		8,666	7,902	91.18%	177	2.04%	32	0.37%	31	0.36%	1	0.01%	17	0.20%	347	4.00%	159	1.83%
Montgomery		11,322	10,444	92.25%	101	0.89%	22	0.19%	50	0.44%	5	0.04%	22	0.19%	449	3.97%	229	2.02%
Morgan		21,006	19,298	91.87%	126	0.60%	105	0.50%	61	0.29%	8	0.04%	57	0.27%	905	4.31%	446	2.12%
New Madrid		16,434	12,610	76.73%	2,731	16.62%	25	0.15%	62	0.38%	1	0.01%	27	0.16%	725	4.41%	253	1.54%
Newton		58,648	47,551	81.08%	523	0.89%	1,351	2.30%	798	1.36%	790	1.35%	138	0.24%	3,890	6.63%	3,607	6.15%
Nodaway		21,241	19,290	90.81%	363	1.71%	31	0.15%	390	1.84%	2	0.01%	46	0.22%	692	3.26%	427	2.01%
Oregon		8,635	7,990	92.53%	25	0.29%	65	0.75%	8	0.09%	0	0.00%	14	0.16%	416	4.82%	117	1.35%
Osage		13,274	12,688	95.59%	24	0.18%	28	0.21%	3	0.02%	10	0.08%	10	0.08%	386	2.91%	125	0.94%
Ozark		8,553	8,000	93.53%	19	0.22%	38	0.44%	14	0.16%	5	0.06%	41	0.48%	327	3.82%	109	1.27%
Pemiscot		15,661	10,176	64.98%	4,297	27.44%	29	0.19%	35	0.22%	4	0.03%	35	0.22%	670	4.28%	415	2.65%
Perry		18,956	17,657	93.15%	102	0.54%	29	0.15%	123	0.65%	0	0.00%	20	0.11%	642	3.39%	383	2.02%
Pettis		42,980	34,751	80.85%	1,353	3.15%	159	0.37%	294	0.68%	120	0.28%	119	0.28%	2,168	5.04%	4,016	9.34%
Phelps		44,638	37,941	85.00%	1,028	2.30%	231	0.52%	1,506	3.37%	20	0.04%	230	0.52%	2,423	5.43%	1,259	2.82%
Pike		17,587	15,383	87.47%	942	5.36%	40	0.23%	23	0.13%	7	0.04%	32	0.18%	726	4.13%	434	2.47%
Platte		106,718	81,426	76.30%	8,135	7.62%	391	0.37%	2,721	2.55%	695	0.65%	459	0.43%	5,730	5.37%	7,161	6.71%
Polk		31,519	28,682	91.00%	242	0.77%	190	0.60%	131	0.42%	4	0.01%	61	0.19%	1,418	4.50%	791	2.51%
Pulaski		53,955	35,865	66.47%	6,039	11.19%	334	0.62%	1,776	3.29%	402	0.75%	220	0.41%	3,240	6.01%	6,079	11.27%
Putnam		4,681	4,446	94.98%	11	0.23%	5	0.11%	0	0.00%	0	0.00%	0	0.00%	107	2.29%	112	2.39%
Ralls		10,355	9,713	93.80%	114	1.10%	26	0.25%	17	0.16%	4	0.04%	41	0.40%	344	3.32%	96	0.93%
Randolph		24,716	21,271	86.06%	1,351	5.47%	102	0.41%	95	0.38%	9	0.04%	75	0.30%	1,241	5.02%	572	2.31%
Ray		23,158	20,893	90.22%	227	0.98%	133	0.57%	76	0.33%	8	0.03%	53	0.23%	1,188	5.13%	580	2.50%
Reynolds		6,096	5,669	93.00%	33	0.54%	23	0.38%	18	0.30%	2	0.03%	0	0.00%	252	4.13%	99	1.62%
Ripley		10,679	9,885	92.56%	31	0.29%	44	0.41%	28	0.26%	1	0.01%	1	0.01%	562	5.26%	127	1.19%
St. Charles		405,262	335,879	82.88%	20,672	5.10%	623	0.15%	11,068	2.73%	199	0.05%	1,377	0.34%	19,433	4.80%	16,011	3.95%
St. Clair		9,284	8,567	92.28%	26	0.28%	63	0.68%	19	0.20%	7	0.08%	23	0.25%	401	4.32%	178	1.92%
Ste. Genevieve		18,479	17,127	92.68%	320	1.73%	54	0.29%	29	0.16%	2	0.01%	19	0.10%	659	3.57%	269	1.46%
St. Francois		66,922	59,474	88.87%	2,645	3.95%	192	0.29%	403	0.60%	21	0.03%	188	0.28%	2,910	4.35%	1,089	1.63%
St. Louis		1,004,125	624,703	62.21%	245,168	24.42%	1,474	0.15%	48,552	4.84%	264	0.03%	4,736	0.47%	42,050	4.19%	37,178	3.70%
Saline		23,333	17,473	74.89%	1,149	4.92%	68	0.29%	175	0.75%	397	1.70%	233	1.00%	1,008	4.32%	2,830	12.13%
Schuyler		4,032	3,864	95.83%	0	0.00%	1	0.02%	15	0.37%	1	0.02%	9	0.22%	95	2.36%	47	1.17%
Scotland		4,716	4,537	96.20%	6	0.13%	5	0.11%	5	0.11%	1	0.02%	0	0.00%	127	2.69%	35	0.74%
Scott		38,059	30,595	80.39%	4,476	11.76%	84	0.22%	149	0.39%	2	0.01%	97	0.25%	1,721	4.52%	935	2.46%
Shannon		7,031	6,451	91.75%	3	0.04%	37	0.53%	13	0.18%	0	0.00%	3	0.04%	383	5.45%	141	2.01%
Shelby		6,103	5,749	94.20%	20	0.33%	20	0.33%	1	0.02%	0	0.00%	9	0.15%	187	3.06%	117	1.92%
Stoddard		28,672	26,610	92.81%	298	1.04%	67	0.23%	90	0.31%	2	0.01%	33	0.12%	1,006	3.51%	566	1.97%
Stone		31,076	28,296	91.05%	79	0.25%	215	0.69%	115	0.37%	20	0.06%	84	0.27%	1,485	4.78%	782	2.52%
Sullivan		5,999	4,507	75.13%	208	3.47%	26	0.43%	29	0.48%	1	0.02%	14	0.23%	160	2.67%	1,054	17.57%
Taney		56,066	46,468	82.88%	837	1.49%	407	0.73%	608	1.08%	187	0.33%	182	0.32%	3,048	5.44%	4,329	7.72%
Texas		24,487	21,992	89.81%	780	3.19%	142	0.58%	65	0.27%	6	0.02%	46	0.19%	941	3.84%	515	2.10%
Vernon		19,707	17,966	91.17%	110	0.56%	131	0.66%	103	0.52%	18	0.09%	52	0.26%	901	4.57%	426	2.16%
Warren		35,532	31,103	87.54%	718	2.02%	116	0.33%	143	0.40%	0	0.00%	111	0.31%	1,941	5.46%	1,400	3.94%
Washington		23,514	21,378	90.92%	610	2.59%	78	0.33%	40	0.17%	1	0.00%	53	0.23%	1,127	4.79%	227	0.97%
Wayne		10,974	10,093	91.97%	50	0.46%	67	0.61%	23	0.21%	5	0.05%	2	0.02%	579	5.28%	155	1.41%
Webster		39,085	35,893	91.83%	194	0.50%	243	0.62%	141	0.36%	9	0.02%	86	0.22%	1,729	4.42%	790	2.02%
Worth		1,973	1,887	95.64%	0	0.00%	4	0.20%	4	0.20%	5	0.25%	0	0.00%	48	2.43%	25	1.27%
Wright		18,188	16,654	91.57%	111	0.61%	73	0.40%	48	0.26%	5	0.03%	59	0.32%	868	4.77%	370	2.03%
St. Louis (city)		301,578	129,368	42.90%	128,993	42.77%	614	0.20%	12,205	4.05%	88	0.03%	1,773	0.59%	13,132	4.35%	15,405	5.11%

== Former county names ==
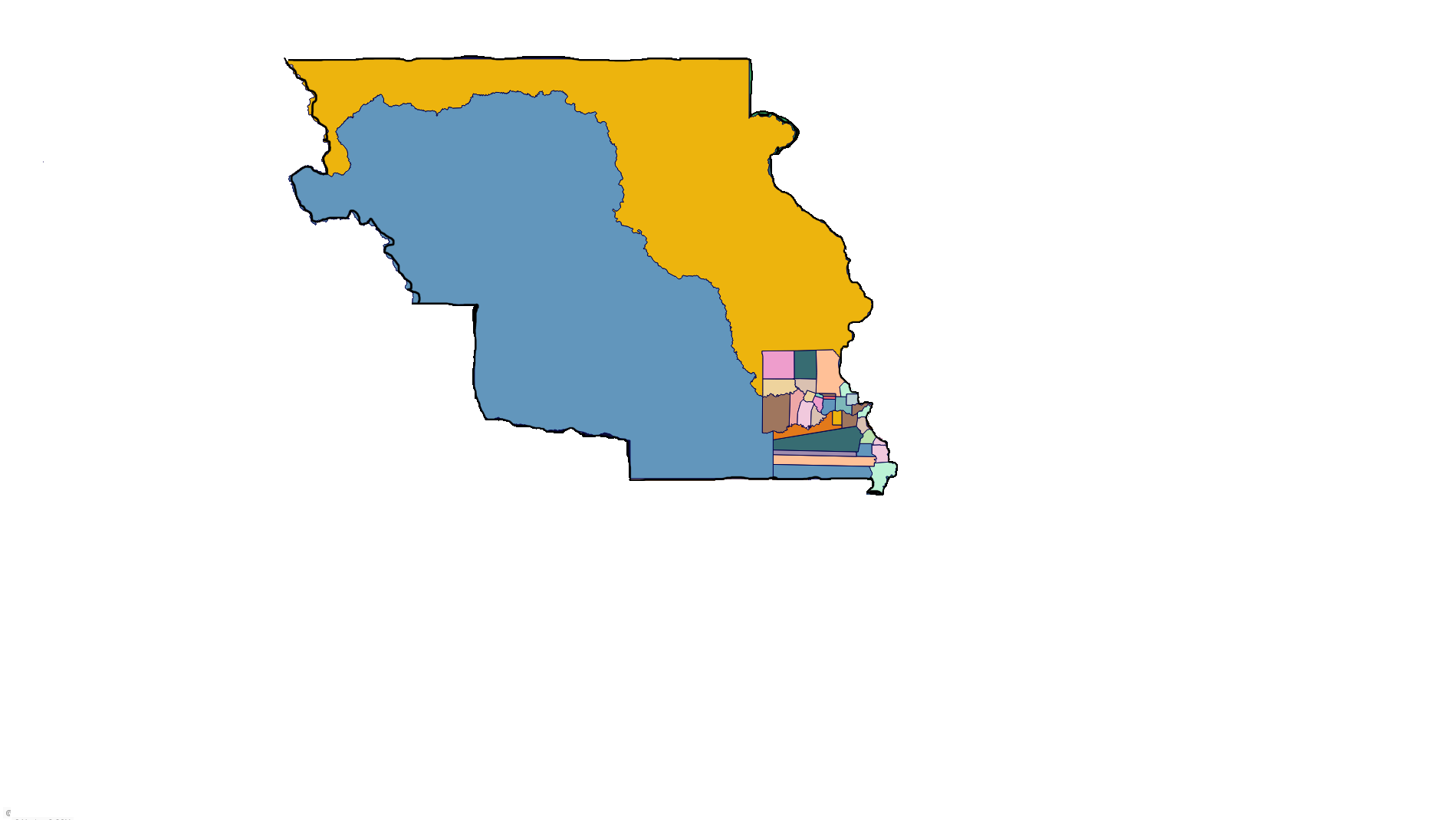
Former Missouri counties

County	Etymology	Changed to
Allen County	Unknown	Atchison County in 1845
Ashley County	William Henry Ashley (1778–1838), early settler	Texas County in 1845 upon organization
Decatur County	Stephen Decatur (1779–1820), American naval officer	Ozark County in 1845
Dodge County	Unknown	Dodge County was created as its own county from Putnam County in 1846, but was dissolved back into Putnam County in 1853
Highland County	Unknown	Sullivan County in 1845 upon organization
Kinderhook County	Kinderhook, New York, birthplace of Martin Van Buren	Camden County in 1843
Lillard County	James Lillard of Tennessee, who served in the first state legislature of Missouri	Lafayette County in 1825
Niangua County	Niangua River, a tributary of the Osage River – "niangua" comes from the Native American word nehemgar, which means "a river of numerous springs or sources"	Dallas County in 1844 because of the difficulty in pronouncing and spelling Niangua
Rives County	Unknown	Henry County in 1841
Seneca County	Seneca Nation, a group of Native Americans from New York	McDonald County in 1847 upon organization
Van Buren County	Martin Van Buren (1782–1862), eighth President of the United States and also Vice President under Andrew Jackson	Cass County in 1849 in honor of Van Buren's opponent in the presidential election of 1848

== See also ==
- List of townships in Missouri
- List of cities in Missouri
- List of U.S. counties by population
- Missouri census statistical areas
- Demographics of Missouri
