= Hannibal micropolitan area =

Area in Missouri, USA

Coordinates: 39.7°N 91.6°W

Hannibal, MO Hannibal, Missouri Micropolitan Statistical Area
- Micropolitan Statistical Area
- Mark Twain's boyhood home in Hannibal
Map of Quincy–Hannibal, IL–MO CSA
City of Hannibal, Missouri
Hannibal, Missouri µSA
City of Quincy, Illinois
Quincy, Illinois µSA
- Country: United States
- State: Illinois; Missouri
- Principal city: Quincy, Illinois
- Largest city: Hannibal, Missouri
- Time zone: UTC−6 (CST)
  - Summer (DST): UTC−5 (CDT)

The Hannibal Micropolitan Statistical Area, as defined by the United States Census Bureau, is an area consisting of two counties in northeast Missouri, anchored by the city of Hannibal.

As of the 2000 census, the region had a population of 37,915 and as of 2010 census, the population was 38,948.

== Counties ==
- Marion
- Ralls
- Monroe (only Monroe City)

== Communities ==
=== Places with more than 15,000 inhabitants ===
- Hannibal (Principal city) Pop: 17,916

=== Places with 1,000 to 5,000 inhabitants ===
- Palmyra Pop: 3,954
- Vandalia (partial) Pop: 3,899
- Monroe City (partial) Pop: 2,531

=== Places with less than 1,000 inhabitants ===
- New London Pop: 974
- Perry Pop: 693
- Center Pop: 508
- Rennselaer Pop: 228

=== Unincorporated places ===
- Philadelphia
- Saverton
- Taylor
- West Quincy

== Townships ==
=== Marion County ===
- Fabius
- Liberty
- Mason
- Miller
- Round Grove
- South River
- Union
- Warren

=== Ralls County ===
- Center
- Clay
- Jasper
- Saline
- Salt River
- Saverton
- Spencer

== Demographics ==
As of the census of 2000, there were 37,915 people, 14,802 households, and 10,307 families residing within the μSA. The racial makeup of the μSA was 94.45% White, 3.73% African American, 0.25% Native American, 0.23% Asian, 0.06% Pacific Islander, 0.14% from other races, and 1.14% from two or more races. Hispanic or Latino of any race were 0.78% of the population.

The median income for a household in the μSA was $34,434, and the median income for a family was $41,623. Males had a median income of $29,537 versus $20,415 for females. The per capita income for the μSA was $16,710.

== See also ==
- Missouri census statistical areas
- Quincy, IL-MO Micropolitan Statistical Area
