= Jug Run =

Stream in the US state of Missouri

Jug Run is a stream in Ralls County in the U.S. state of Missouri. It is a tributary of Spencer Creek.

The stream headwaters arise just northwest of Missouri Route 19 southwest of Center at 39°29′16″N 91°35′08″W at an elevation of approximately 740 Feet. The stream flows to the east-northeast passing under Route 19 and turns to the southeast as it passes just south of Center. The stream confluence with Spencer Creek is about two miles east-northeast of Madisonville and one-half mile from the Ralls-Pike county line. The confluence is at 39°28′11″N 91°28′30″W at an elevation of 554 feet.

Jug Run was so named for the fact customers carried jugs to a whiskey dealer near the creek.

== See also ==
- List of rivers of Missouri
