= Griffin Hollow =

Valley in Missouri, United States

Griffin Hollow is a valley in Ralls County in the U.S. state of Missouri. The valley stream is a tributary to the Salt River.

The stream headwaters are just northwest of Center at 39°30′14″N 91°32′39″W at an elevation of about 710 feet and the confluence with the Salt River is at 39°32′51″N 91°34′23″W with an elevation of 525 feet.

Griffin Hollow has the name of David Griffin, the original owner of the site.
