= 1860 United States presidential election in Missouri =

- November 2, 1860
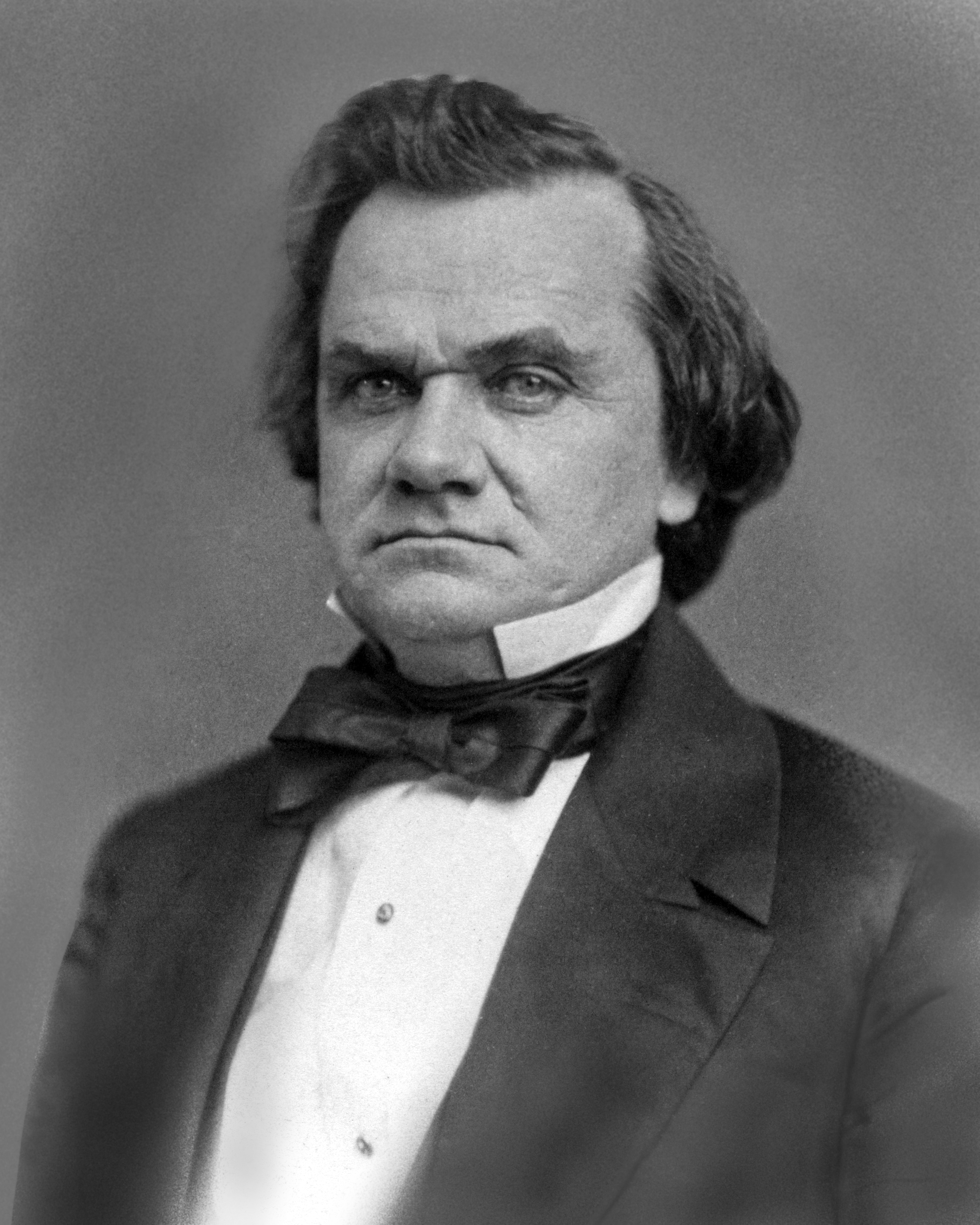

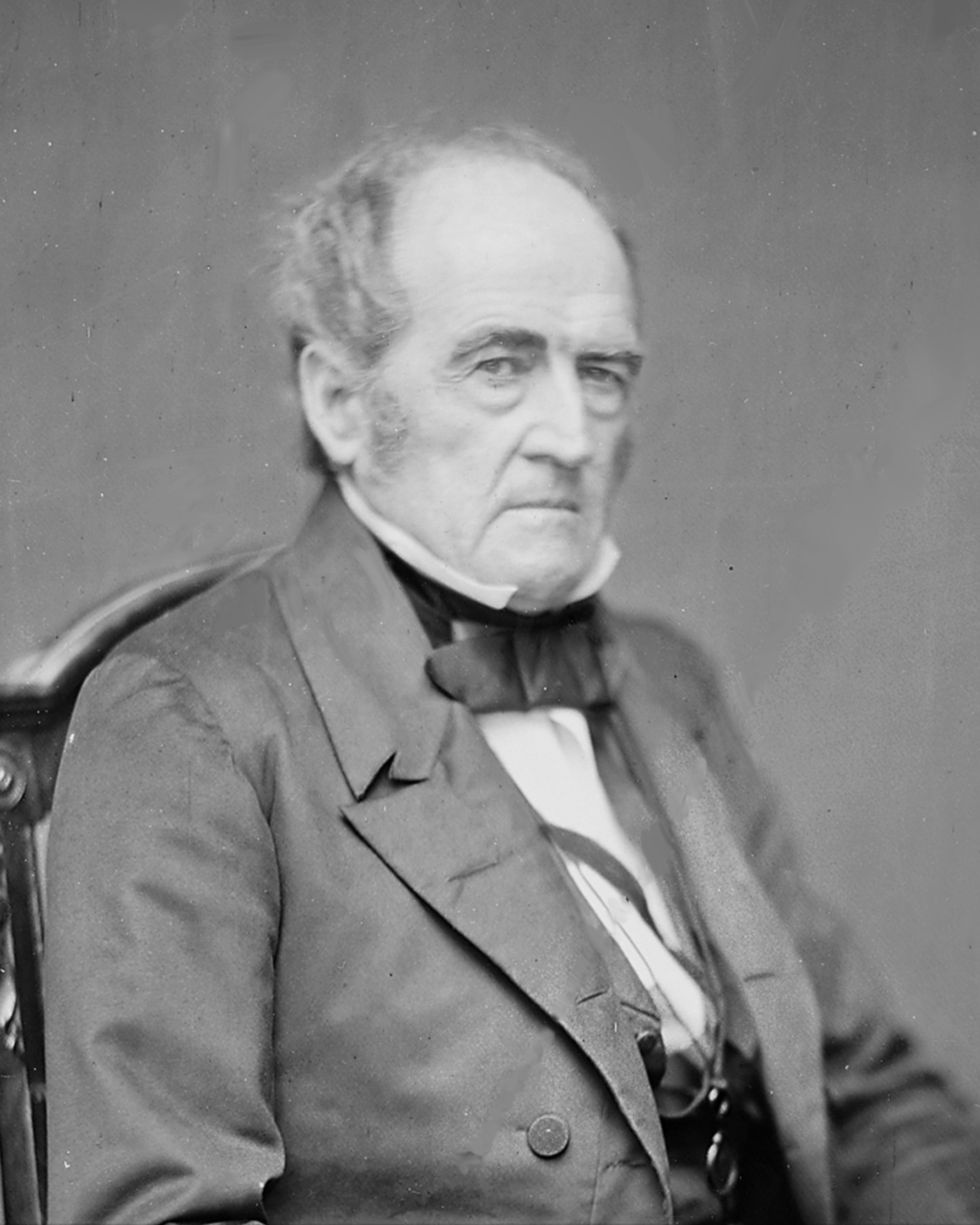

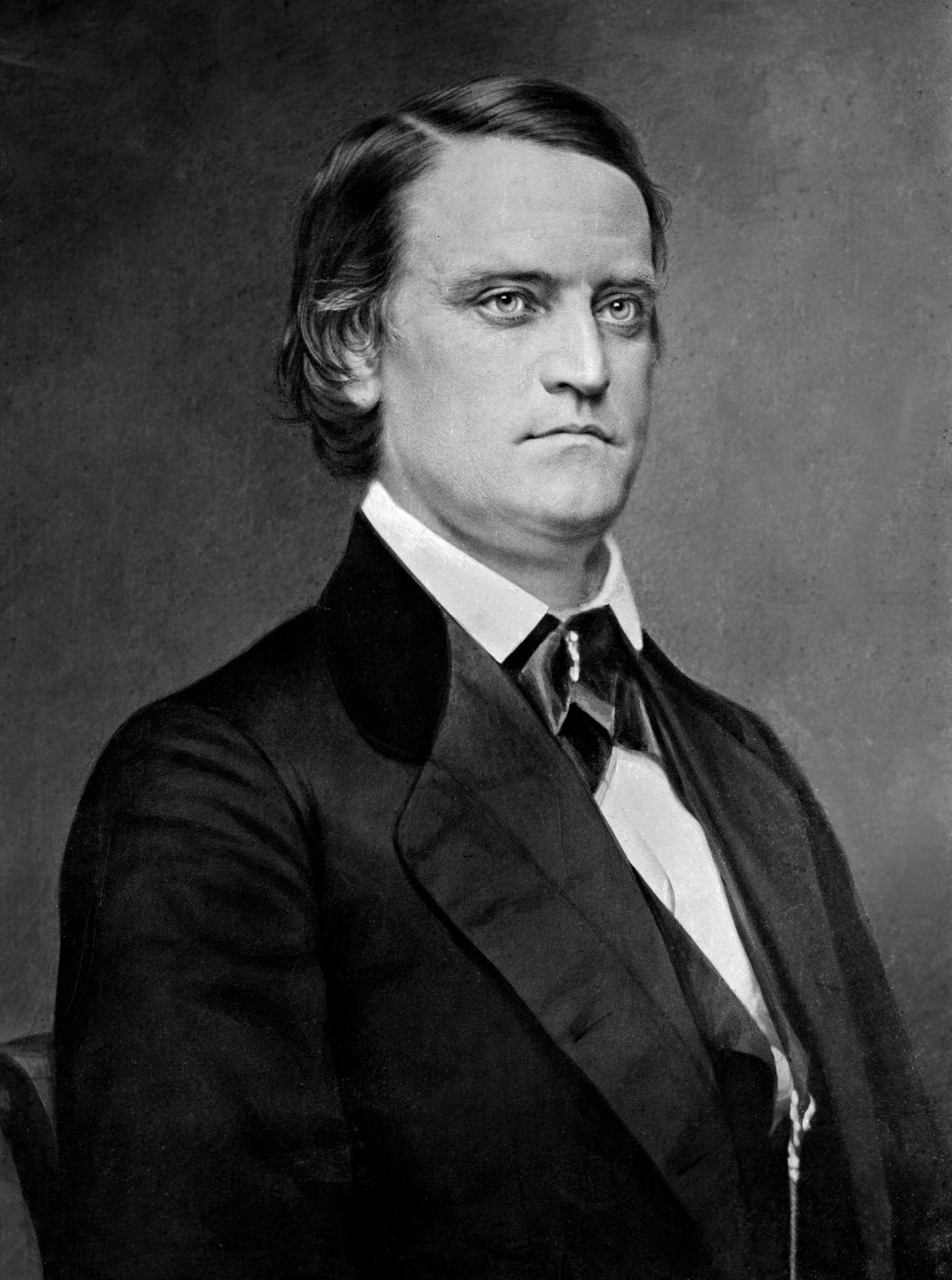

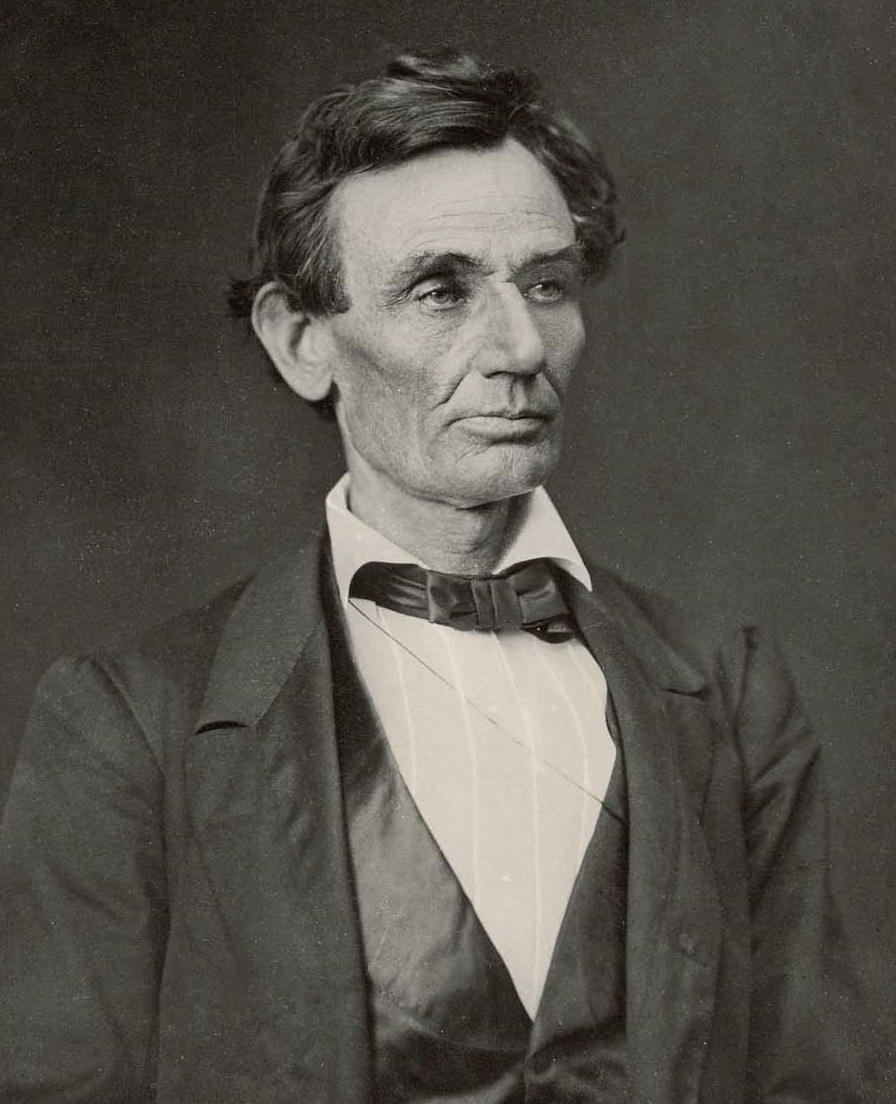
Nominee	Stephen A. Douglas	John Bell
Party	Democratic	Constitutional Union
Home state	Illinois	Tennessee
Running mate	Herschel V. Johnson	Edward Everett
Electoral vote	9	0
Popular vote	58,801	58,372
Percentage	35.52%	35.26%
Nominee	John C. Breckinridge	Abraham Lincoln
Party	Southern Democratic	Republican
Home state	Kentucky	Illinois
Running mate	Joseph Lane	Hannibal Hamlin
Electoral vote	0	0
Popular vote	31,362	17,028
Percentage	18.94%	10.28%
- County results (Note: Current county borders) Douglas 40–50% 50–60% 60–70% Bell 40–50% 50–60% 60–70% Breckinridge 40–50% 50–60% 60–70% 80–90% Lincoln 40–50% 50–60% Unknown/no vote
President before election
James Buchanan
Democratic
Elected President
Abraham Lincoln
Republican

The 1860 United States presidential election in Missouri took place on November 2, 1860, as part of the 1860 United States presidential election. Voters chose nine representatives, or electors to the Electoral College, who voted for president and vice president.

Missouri was won by Democratic candidate Stephen A. Douglas, by a very narrow margin of 0.26%. The state was the only one to fully give its votes to Douglas, though he won the popular vote and three of the seven electoral votes from New Jersey under a fusion ticket.

As of the 2024 presidential election, this is the last occasion when Putnam County, Ozark County, and Taney County voted for a candidate running as a Democrat, with the former voting for Douglas and the latter two voting for Breckinridge. This was also the last election until 1984 in which Monroe County did not vote for the Democratic candidate. This was the second presidential election in American history that four candidates each won at least one county in the same state, something that has only been repeated in 1912 (in North Dakota and in Kansas), and 1824 (in Illinois and Virginia). Missouri was also the only slave state in which Lincoln won any counties.

== Results ==
1860 United States presidential election in Missouri
Party	Candidate	Votes	%
Democratic	Stephen A. Douglas	58,801	35.52%
Constitutional Union	John Bell	58,372	35.26%
Southern Democratic	John C. Breckinridge	31,362	18.94%
Republican	Abraham Lincoln	17,028	10.28%
Total votes		165,563	100%

=== Results by county ===
County	Stephen A. Douglas Democratic		John Bell Constitutional Union		John C. Breckinridge Southern Democratic		Abraham Lincoln Republican		Total votes cast
County	#	%	#	%	#	%	#	%	Total votes cast
Adair	616	42.99%	293	20.45%	339	23.66%	185	12.91%	1,433
Andrew	819	42.83%	677	35.41%	319	16.68%	97	5.07%	1,912
Atchison	645	68.54%	165	17.53%	63	6.70%	68	7.23%	941
Audrain	289	26.86%	580	53.90%	206	19.14%	1	0.09%	1,076
Barry	257	29.30%	333	37.97%	286	32.61%	1	0.11%	877
Barton	107	35.20%	76	25.00%	93	30.59%	28	9.21%	304
Bates	511	40.08%	386	30.27%	348	27.29%	30	2.35%	1,275
Benton	574	54.46%	306	29.03%	100	9.49%	74	7.02%	1,054
Bollinger	250	46.47%	166	30.86%	99	18.40%	23	4.28%	538
Boone	578	19.84%	1,671	57.36%	652	22.38%	12	0.41%	2,913
Buchanan	1,626	40.86%	1,287	32.34%	614	15.43%	452	11.36%	3,979
Butler	235	68.91%	88	25.81%	17	4.99%	1	0.29%	341
Caldwell	263	30.62%	367	42.72%	186	21.65%	43	5.01%	859
Callaway	839	31.88%	1,306	49.62%	472	17.93%	15	0.57%	2,632
Camden	269	42.63%	224	35.50%	132	20.92%	6	0.95%	631
Cape Girardeau	543	32.05%	651	38.43%	325	19.19%	175	10.33%	1,694
Carroll	752	47.50%	552	34.87%	276	17.44%	3	0.19%	1,583
Carter	4	3.88%	16	15.53%	83	80.58%	0	0.00%	103
Cass	242	15.25%	715	45.05%	607	38.25%	23	1.45%	1,587
Cedar	324	37.20%	266	30.54%	277	31.80%	4	0.46%	871
Chariton	692	43.36%	608	38.10%	295	18.48%	1	0.06%	1,596
Christian	120	15.58%	342	44.42%	308	40.00%	0	0.00%	770
Clark	542	26.21%	752	36.36%	497	24.03%	277	13.39%	2,068
Clay	528	28.12%	1,045	55.64%	305	16.24%	0	0.00%	1,878
Clinton	368	26.92%	674	49.31%	314	22.97%	11	0.80%	1,367
Cole	430	34.21%	226	17.98%	487	38.74%	114	9.07%	1,257
Cooper	988	44.09%	952	42.48%	281	12.54%	20	0.89%	2,241
Crawford	169	22.56%	353	47.13%	192	25.63%	35	4.67%	749
Dade	283	28.24%	406	40.52%	305	30.44%	8	0.80%	1,002
Dallas	225	31.91%	288	40.85%	172	24.40%	20	2.84%	705
Daviess	692	45.08%	545	35.50%	265	17.26%	33	2.15%	1,535
DeKalb	239	34.05%	243	34.62%	213	30.34%	7	1.00%	702
Dent	207	26.04%	243	30.57%	338	42.52%	7	0.88%	795
Dunklin	150	34.25%	209	47.72%	79	18.04%	0	0.00%	438
Franklin	888	42.96%	577	27.91%	108	5.22%	494	23.90%	2,067
Gasconade	188	22.68%	157	18.94%	51	6.15%	433	52.23%	829
Gentry	873	47.19%	517	27.95%	259	14.00%	201	10.86%	1,850
Greene	298	17.13%	986	56.67%	414	23.79%	42	2.41%	1,740
Grundy	416	33.49%	507	40.82%	190	15.30%	129	10.39%	1,242
Harrison	910	57.74%	319	20.24%	50	3.17%	297	18.85%	1,576
Henry	623	39.58%	703	44.66%	232	14.74%	16	1.02%	1,574
Hickory	298	45.64%	197	30.17%	143	21.90%	15	2.30%	653
Holt	453	38.59%	348	29.64%	171	14.57%	202	17.21%	1,174
Howard	939	44.57%	920	43.66%	247	11.72%	1	0.05%	2,107
Howell	136	33.75%	176	43.67%	91	22.58%	0	0.00%	403
Iron	349	50.80%	194	28.24%	36	5.24%	108	15.72%	687
Jackson	1,095	29.58%	1,473	39.79%	943	25.47%	191	5.16%	3,702
Jasper	407	38.36%	424	39.96%	192	18.10%	38	3.58%	1,061
Jefferson	490	40.50%	416	34.38%	155	12.81%	149	12.31%	1,210
Johnson	617	25.86%	1,224	51.30%	527	22.09%	18	0.75%	2,386
Knox	687	41.16%	520	31.16%	301	18.03%	161	9.65%	1,669
Laclede	189	23.45%	335	41.56%	276	34.24%	6	0.74%	806
Lafayette	774	28.19%	1,577	57.43%	371	13.51%	24	0.87%	2,746
Lawrence	138	11.92%	445	38.43%	516	44.56%	59	5.09%	1,158
Lewis	468	24.11%	833	42.92%	597	30.76%	43	2.22%	1,941
Lincoln	806	41.76%	725	37.56%	396	20.52%	3	0.16%	1,930
Linn	521	37.46%	546	39.25%	219	15.74%	105	7.55%	1,391
Livingston	401	27.30%	578	39.35%	470	31.99%	20	1.36%	1,469
Macon	1,176	47.75%	655	27.53%	414	17.40%	134	5.63%	2,379
Madison	305	47.81%	226	35.42%	98	15.36%	9	1.41%	638
Maries	98	19.25%	95	18.66%	309	60.71%	7	1.38%	509
Marion	1,240	37.66%	1,386	42.09%	432	13.12%	235	7.14%	3,293
McDonald	206	38.08%	138	25.51%	194	35.86%	3	0.55%	541
Mercer	682	47.96%	491	34.53%	169	11.88%	80	5.63%	1,422
Miller	94	11.68%	193	23.98%	495	61.49%	23	2.86%	805
Mississippi	233	32.18%	305	42.13%	185	25.55%	1	0.14%	724
Moniteau	476	33.03%	546	37.89%	332	23.04%	87	6.04%	1,441
Monroe	680	31.16%	1,086	49.77%	408	18.70%	8	0.37%	2,182
Montgomery	612	43.78%	658	47.07%	83	5.94%	45	3.22%	1,398
Morgan	550	50.32%	321	29.37%	204	18.66%	18	1.65%	1,093
New Madrid	117	23.40%	223	44.60%	160	32.00%	0	0.00%	500
Newton	654	48.92%	406	30.37%	255	19.07%	22	1.65%	1,337
Nodaway	546	44.32%	265	21.51%	274	22.24%	147	11.93%	1,232
Oregon	66	18.44%	45	12.57%	245	68.44%	2	0.56%	358
Osage	235	23.71%	190	19.17%	308	31.08%	258	26.03%	991
Ozark (Note: The votes for Douglas County are included with those for Ozark.)	81	26.56%	69	22.62%	155	50.82%	0	0.00%	305
Pemiscot	118	34.50%	154	45.03%	70	20.47%	0	0.00%	342
Perry	467	52.71%	217	24.49%	63	7.11%	139	15.69%	886
Pettis	369	30.65%	615	51.08%	211	17.52%	9	0.75%	1,204
Phelps	254	27.61%	199	21.63%	430	46.74%	37	4.02%	920
Pike	1,117	39.17%	1,300	45.58%	420	14.73%	15	0.53%	2,852
Platte	845	28.78%	1,208	41.14%	877	29.87%	6	0.20%	2,936
Polk	125	9.36%	730	54.64%	477	35.70%	4	0.30%	1,336
Pulaski	107	23.41%	62	13.57%	281	61.49%	7	1.53%	457
Putnam	590	44.83%	369	28.04%	246	18.69%	111	8.43%	1,316
Ralls	391	34.72%	585	51.95%	149	13.23%	1	0.09%	1,126
Randolph	360	21.16%	821	48.27%	520	30.57%	0	0.00%	1,701
Ray	881	41.38%	1,006	47.25%	233	10.94%	9	0.42%	2,129
Reynolds	123	49.20%	38	15.20%	85	34.00%	4	1.60%	250
Ripley	78	20.31%	74	19.27%	232	60.42%	0	0.00%	384
Saline	563	28.67%	1,035	52.70%	366	18.64%	0	0.00%	1,964
Schuyler	455	46.10%	267	27.05%	251	25.43%	14	1.42%	987
Scotland	741	47.47%	436	27.93%	187	11.98%	197	12.62%	1,561
Scott	215	32.77%	243	37.04%	192	29.27%	6	0.91%	656
Shannon	27	13.92%	38	19.59%	127	65.46%	2	1.03%	194
Shelby	476	30.49%	702	44.97%	293	18.77%	90	5.77%	1,561
St. Charles	832	40.61%	619	30.21%	64	3.12%	534	26.06%	2,049
St. Francois	592	50.47%	421	35.89%	141	12.02%	19	1.62%	1,173
St. Louis	9,264	37.43%	4,931	19.92%	610	2.46%	9,945	40.18%	24,750
Ste. Genevieve	351	51.02%	217	31.54%	72	10.47%	48	6.98%	688
Stoddard	230	28.29%	385	47.36%	198	24.35%	0	0.00%	813
Stone	83	36.73%	31	13.72%	112	49.56%	0	0.00%	226
Sullivan	557	35.08%	373	23.49%	575	36.21%	83	5.23%	1,588
Taney	97	22.72%	43	10.07%	287	67.21%	0	0.00%	427
Texas	61	7.90%	194	25.13%	511	66.19%	6	0.78%	772
Vernon	151	20.43%	207	28.01%	381	51.56%	0	0.00%	739
Warren	510	50.95%	307	30.67%	89	8.89%	95	9.49%	1,001
Washington	635	52.13%	493	40.48%	62	5.09%	28	2.30%	1,218
Wayne	185	25.55%	245	33.84%	291	40.19%	3	0.41%	724
Webster	172	19.33%	335	37.64%	376	42.25%	7	0.79%	890
Wright	44	8.13%	128	23.66%	369	68.21%	0	0.00%	541
Total	58,801	35.52%	58,372	35.26%	31,362	18.94%	17,028	10.28%	165,563

== See also ==
- United States presidential elections in Missouri
