= Spencer Township, Ralls County, Missouri =

Township in Ralls County, Missouri, U.S.

Coordinates: 39.5522°N 91.4150°W

Spencer Township is an inactive township in Ralls County, in the U.S. state of Missouri.

Spencer Township was erected in 1821, taking its name from Spencer Creek.
