= Hydesburg, Missouri =

Extinct hamlet in Missouri, U.S.

Coordinates: 39.6763938°N 91.4672444°W

Hydesburg is an extinct town in Ralls County, in the U.S. state of Missouri.

A post office called Hydesburgh was in operation from 1832 until 1871. The community has the name of one Mr. Hyde, a pioneer settler.
