= Round Grove =

Round Grove may refer to:

- Round Grove, Illinois
- Round Grove, Indiana
- Round Grove, Missouri
- Round Grove Township (disambiguation)
