= Fools Creek =

Stream in the U.S. state of Missouri

Coordinates: 39.6231016°N 91.2379214°W

Fools Creek is a stream in Ralls County in the U.S. state of Missouri. It is a tributary of the Mississippi River.

Fools Creek was named for an incident when a drunk person drowned in the creek even though the water was shallow.

== See also ==
- List of rivers of Missouri
