= Garth Woodside Mansion =

Coordinates: 39.6692°N 91.4089°W

The Garth Woodside Mansion (also known as the John Garth House, The Woodside, Woodside Place) is an 1871 "Second Empire" Italianate mansion built by Col. John H. Garth. The Garth Mansion is located in Ralls County in Hannibal, Missouri. The Mansion is a wonderful example of this style. John H. Garth played a significant role in the areas lumber, banking and many others in the Hannibal area. Many consider the Garth Mansion one of the finest examples of this style of architecture. The Garth Woodside Mansion is currently a Bed and Breakfast and restaurant. Approx 85-90% of the furnishings on the second floor are the original pieces used to furnish the home when the mansion's construction was completed in 1871.

== Exterior ==
The exterior of the Garth Mansion is made of wood most likely from John Garth's own lumber mills. Only small sections and pieces have been replaced over the years near the base of the building, the second story porch, and near the Western side of the mansion where most of the additions have been placed. The Garth Mansion is a "Painted Lady" home (cite the source of America's Painted Lady's Book)

== Basement ==
The Garth Mansion and the Woodside Restaurant feature a sub level basement. The basement is the same size as the first floor. The floor is compacted dirt, with plots of concrete to support the furnaces that were installed. A drop ceiling was once present, but has now been removed. Current use of the basement under the mansion is storage. Current use under the Woodside Restaurant is additional dry storage and wine cellar. The basement under the Woodside Restaurant is concrete. Several cisterns (five) were discovered and filled during the construction of the basement of the Woodside Restaurant.

== First floor ==
The main floor of the Garth Mansion holds approximately 90% of the original furnishings. It is very fortunate to still contain so many of the original museum quality pieces to grace the mansion. The first floor of the mansion is slightly elevated as the mansion was built halfway on a slight hill. The main entrance of the Garth Mansion, found on the eastern side of the building, is located on a large wraparound veranda up a grand staircase.

== Outbuildings ==
Of the six original buildings, only four are still standing. The main house, a houseman's house, one stable barn are still intact. The ice house has been reduced to about 40 percent of its original structure and two additional barns have been demolished for safety concerns. The current barn that is still standing is used for llamas that live in a pasture just beyond the Western side of the Mansion. Other buildings have been built with the purpose of renting them out to travelers. The "Dowager House" was completed in 2002. The Dowager is a 1,600-square-foot (150 m^{2}) building southwest of the mansion overlooking the largest pond on the current property. Two other cottages have been built with the intention of renting out as well. They are nearly identical and are located west of the main house.

== New construction ==
Approximately 20 years after the Garth Mansion was completed, Mrs. Helen K. Garth expanded the square porch to become a true wraparound veranda large enough for many family and friends to enjoy the picturesque view both south and east. When the Garth Mansion was transformed into an operating Bed and Breakfast in 1987 many changes had been made to accommodate overnight guests. Each of the rooms featured a large closet. These closets are now used as restrooms and retrofitted with running water and sewer. The original method of heating the mansion was carbide gas. The original gas pipes now serve as tubing to hold electrical wire. This wire powers the lights that replace the wicks in lamps and light fixtures of which many are original to the house.
