= Flint Hill, Ralls County, Missouri =

Unincorporated community in Missouri, United States

Coordinates: 39°37′26″N 91°23′00″W

Flint Hill is an unincorporated community in Ralls County, in the U.S. state of Missouri. The community lies on Camp Creek approximately one-half mile north of the Salt River. US Route 61 passes 1.5 miles to the west along Missouri Route O.

== History ==
The community once had a Baptist church and a schoolhouse, both of which are now defunct. The area was named was so named for the flint rock hill upon which the church stood.
