= Hutchison, Missouri =

Unincorporated community in Missouri, United States

Coordinates: 39°20′45″N 91°38′34″W

Hutchison is an unincorporated community in Ralls County, in the U.S. state of Missouri.

== History ==
A post office called Hutchison was established in 1887, and remained in operation until 1906. The community has the last name of Dr. Samuel Hutchison and his brother James Hutchison, early citizens.
