= 1912 United States presidential election in Kansas =

- November 5, 1912

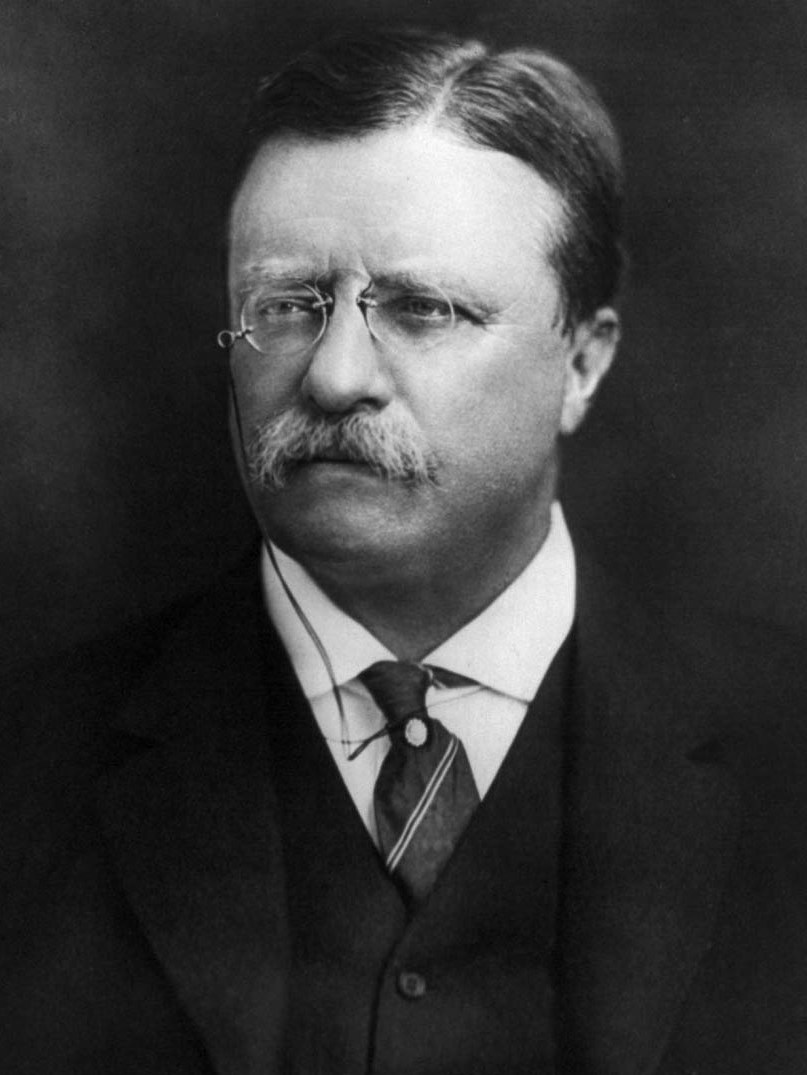

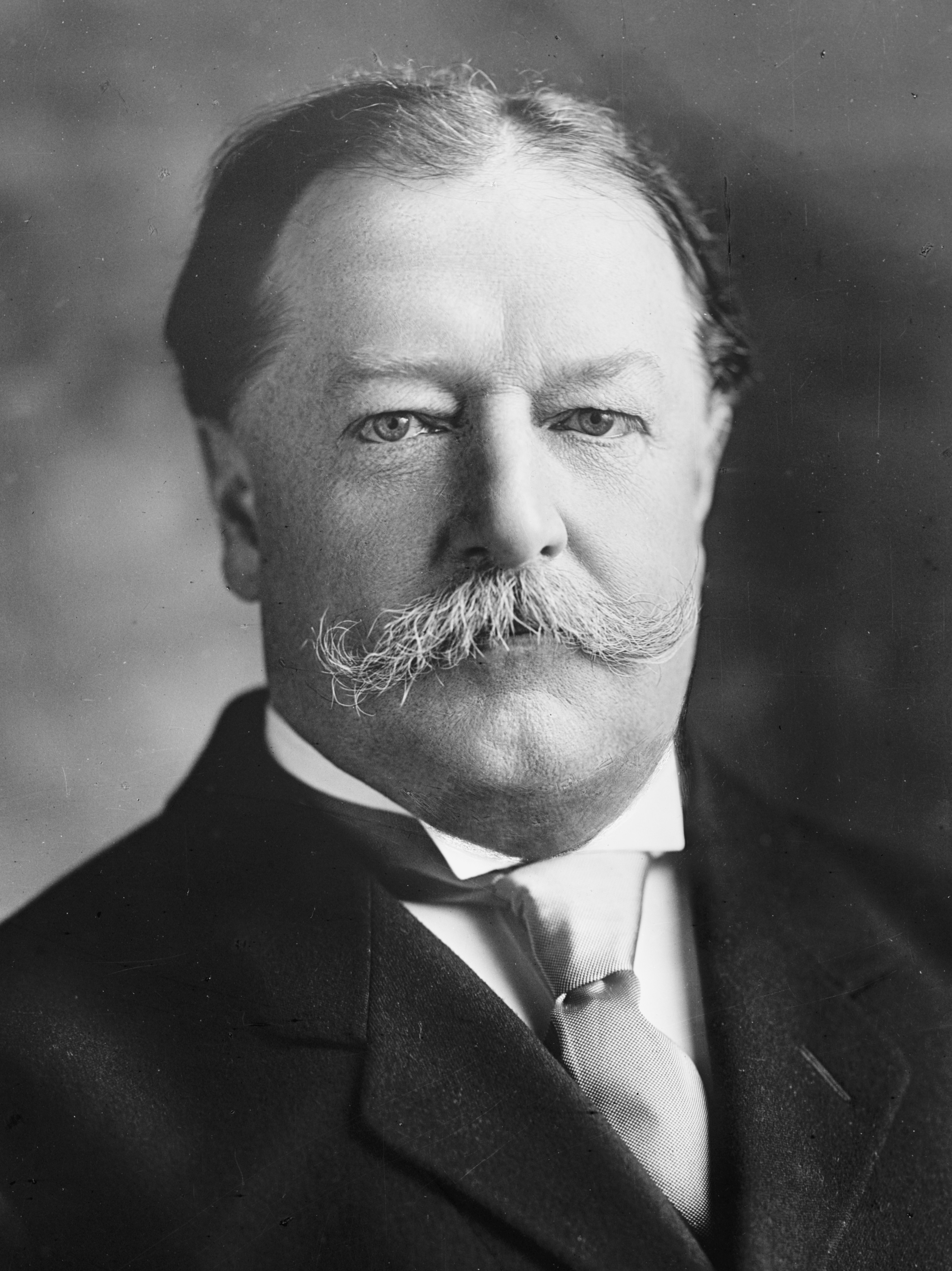

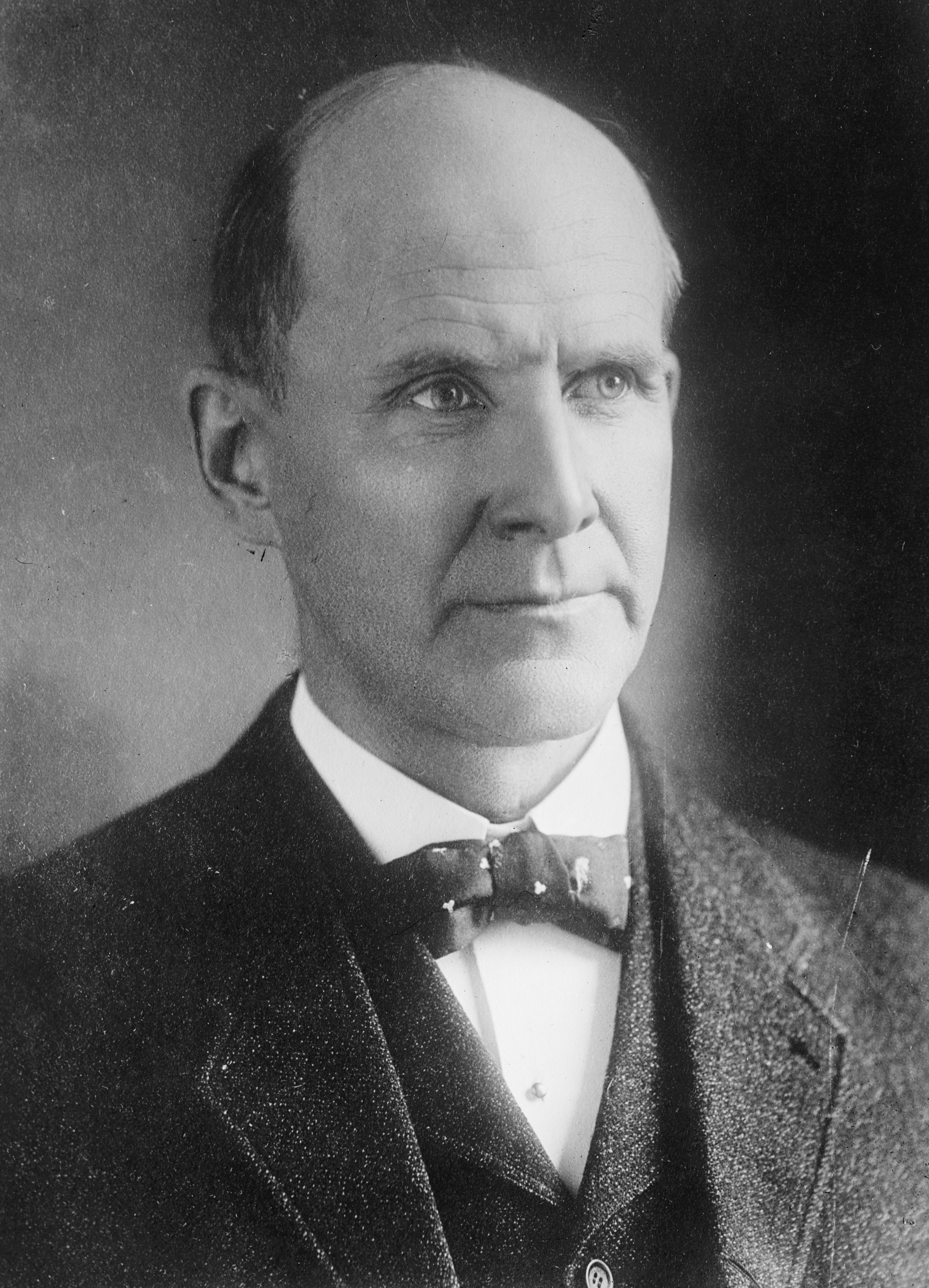
Nominee	Woodrow Wilson	Theodore Roosevelt
Party	Democratic	Independent
Alliance		Progressive
Home state	New Jersey	New York
Running mate	Thomas R. Marshall	Hiram Johnson
Electoral vote	10	0
Popular vote	143,663	120,210
Percentage	39.30%	32.88%
Nominee	William Howard Taft	Eugene V. Debs
Party	Republican	Socialist
Home state	Ohio	Indiana
Running mate	Nicholas M. Butler	Emil Seidel
Electoral vote	0	0
Popular vote	74,845	26,779
Percentage	20.47%	7.33%
County results
Wilson
30–40%
40–50%
50–60%
60–70%
Roosevelt
30–40%
40–50%
50–60%
Taft
30–40%
Debs
30–40%
President before election
William Howard Taft
Republican
Elected President
Woodrow Wilson
Democratic

The 1912 United States presidential election in Kansas took place on November 5, 1912, as part of the 1912 United States presidential election. Voters chose ten representatives, or electors, to the Electoral College, who voted for president and vice president.

Kansas was won by Princeton University President Woodrow Wilson (D–New Jersey), running with governor of Indiana Thomas R. Marshall, with 39.30 percent of the popular vote, against the 26th president of the United States Theodore Roosevelt (I (Note: Although Roosevelt ran under the "Progressive" or "Bull Moose" banner in most states, he was listed as "Independent" in Kansas.)–New York), running with governor of California Hiram Johnson, with 32.88 percent of the popular vote, the 27th president of the United States William Howard Taft (R–Ohio), running with Columbia University President Nicholas Murray Butler, with 20.47 percent of the popular vote and the five-time candidate of the Socialist Party of America for President of the United States Eugene V. Debs (S–Indiana), running with the first Socialist mayor of a major city (Milwaukee) in the United States Emil Seidel, with 7.33 percent of the popular vote.

As a result of his win in the state, Wilson became the second Democratic presidential candidate to ever win Kansas as well as the first one since William Jennings Bryan in 1896.

This is the only election when heavily Yankee Brown County has voted for a Democratic presidential candidate, and also the only election until 2020 when Riley County – another heavily Yankee county in the Dissected Till Plains of northeastern Kansas – has not supported the official Republican nominee. This election marks the last time four different candidates won at least one county within one individual state. This feat would be shared by North Dakota in the same election, but the only other occurrences have been in Missouri in 1860, and in Illinois and Virginia in 1824.

== Results ==
1912 United States presidential election in Kansas
Party	Candidate	Votes	%
Democratic	Woodrow Wilson	143,663	39.30%
Independent	Theodore Roosevelt	120,210	32.88%
Republican	William Howard Taft (incumbent)	74,845	20.47%
Socialist	Eugene V. Debs	26,779	7.33%
Total votes		365,560	100%

=== Results by county ===
1912 United States presidential election in Kansas by county
County	Thomas Woodrow Wilson Democratic		William Howard Taft Republican		Theodore Roosevelt Independent		Eugene Victor Debs Socialist		Margin (Note: Because Roosevelt finished ahead of Taft in Kansas as a whole, all margins give are Wilson minus Roosevelt unless stated in the total for the county in question.)		Total votes cast
County	#	%	#	%	#	%	#	%	#	%	Total votes cast
Allen	1,739	36.04%	1,692	35.07%	1,003	20.79%	391	8.10%	47 (Note: In this county where Taft did run second ahead of Roosevelt, the margin given is that between Wilson and Taft and the percentage margin is Wilson percentage minus Taft percentage.)	0.97%	4,825
Anderson	1,365	43.92%	618	19.88%	934	30.05%	191	6.15%	431	13.87%	3,108
Atchison	2,449	43.72%	1,535	27.40%	1,527	27.26%	91	1.62%	914	16.32%	5,602
Barber	883	38.11%	295	12.73%	1,027	44.32%	112	4.83%	-144	-6.21%	2,317
Barton	2,069	50.85%	692	17.01%	1,113	27.35%	195	4.79%	956	23.49%	4,069
Bourbon	2,209	41.25%	1,448	27.04%	991	18.51%	707	13.20%	761	14.21%	5,355
Brown	1,774	36.65%	1,512	31.24%	1,435	29.65%	119	2.46%	262	5.41%	4,840
Butler	2,005	37.79%	971	18.30%	2,096	39.50%	234	4.41%	-91	-1.72%	5,306
Chase	812	43.35%	476	25.41%	503	26.86%	82	4.38%	309	16.50%	1,873
Chautauqua	752	28.82%	818	31.35%	762	29.21%	277	10.62%	56 (Note: In this county where Wilson ran third behind both Taft and Roosevelt, margin given is Taft vote minus Roosevelt vote and percentage margin Taft percentage minus Roosevelt percentage.)	2.15%	2,609
Cherokee	2,641	35.15%	1,994	26.54%	872	11.61%	2,006	26.70%	635 (Note: In this county where Debs ran ahead of both Taft and Roosevelt, margin give is Wilson vote minus Debs vote and percentage margin Wilson percentage minus Debs percentage.)	8.45%	7,513
Cheyenne	301	34.13%	140	15.87%	302	34.24%	139	15.76%	-1	-0.11%	882
Clark	485	43.54%	162	14.54%	412	36.98%	55	4.94%	73	6.55%	1,114
Clay	1,373	36.96%	843	22.69%	1,250	33.65%	249	6.70%	123	3.31%	3,715
Cloud	1,658	40.18%	899	21.79%	1,289	31.24%	280	6.79%	369	8.94%	4,126
Coffey	1,581	43.48%	681	18.73%	1,190	32.73%	184	5.06%	391	10.75%	3,636
Comanche	377	33.25%	148	13.05%	537	47.35%	72	6.35%	-160	-14.11%	1,134
Cowley	2,539	35.93%	1,113	15.75%	2,594	36.71%	820	11.60%	-55	-0.78%	7,066
Crawford	2,781	26.14%	2,676	25.16%	1,427	13.42%	3,753	35.28%	-972	-9.14%	10,637
Decatur	955	55.52%	256	14.88%	388	22.56%	121	7.03%	567	32.97%	1,720
Dickinson	2,182	40.44%	988	18.31%	1,937	35.90%	288	5.34%	245	4.54%	5,395
Doniphan	1,017	30.13%	1,321	39.14%	945	28.00%	92	2.73%	-304	-9.01%	3,375
Douglas	1,888	36.29%	1,133	21.78%	2,053	39.46%	129	2.48%	-165	-3.17%	5,203
Edwards	764	44.42%	276	16.05%	584	33.95%	96	5.58%	180	10.47%	1,720
Elk	971	38.67%	605	24.09%	735	29.27%	200	7.96%	236	9.40%	2,511
Ellis	1,381	64.87%	175	8.22%	535	25.13%	38	1.78%	846	39.74%	2,129
Ellsworth	1,045	45.38%	353	15.33%	860	37.34%	45	1.95%	185	8.03%	2,303
Finney	573	36.38%	283	17.97%	586	37.21%	133	8.44%	-13	-0.83%	1,575
Ford	1,125	40.79%	529	19.18%	939	34.05%	165	5.98%	186	6.74%	2,758
Franklin	1,970	40.29%	672	13.75%	1,971	40.31%	276	5.65%	-1	-0.02%	4,889
Geary	800	35.94%	387	17.39%	918	41.24%	121	5.44%	-118	-5.30%	2,226
Gove	355	38.76%	170	18.56%	356	38.86%	35	3.82%	-1	-0.11%	916
Graham	636	39.43%	327	20.27%	481	29.82%	169	10.48%	155	9.61%	1,613
Grant	80	29.74%	56	20.82%	111	41.26%	22	8.18%	-31	-11.52%	269
Gray	243	34.62%	112	15.95%	267	38.03%	80	11.40%	-24	-3.42%	702
Greeley	33	12.36%	95	35.58%	106	39.70%	33	12.36%	-11	-4.12%	267
Greenwood	1,334	36.11%	954	25.83%	1,125	30.45%	281	7.61%	209	5.66%	3,694
Hamilton	263	41.81%	134	21.30%	199	31.64%	33	5.25%	64	10.17%	629
Harper	1,274	40.60%	365	11.63%	1,296	41.30%	203	6.47%	-22	-0.70%	3,138
Harvey	1,499	37.74%	703	17.70%	1,590	40.03%	180	4.53%	-91	-2.29%	3,972
Haskell	100	41.67%	61	25.42%	58	24.17%	21	8.75%	39	16.25%	240
Hodgeman	302	38.13%	136	17.17%	319	40.28%	35	4.42%	-17	-2.15%	792
Jackson	1,565	39.89%	1,027	26.18%	1,286	32.78%	45	1.15%	279	7.11%	3,923
Jefferson	1,537	39.59%	1,155	29.75%	1,116	28.75%	74	1.91%	382	9.84%	3,882
Jewell	1,871	42.36%	906	20.51%	1,497	33.89%	143	3.24%	374	8.47%	4,417
Johnson	1,837	41.85%	834	19.00%	1,562	35.58%	157	3.58%	275	6.26%	4,390
Kearny	236	35.54%	113	17.02%	232	34.94%	83	12.50%	4	0.60%	664
Kingman	1,421	46.35%	336	10.96%	1,160	37.83%	149	4.86%	261	8.51%	3,066
Kiowa	506	35.91%	276	19.59%	549	38.96%	78	5.54%	-43	-3.05%	1,409
Labette	2,568	37.02%	1,516	21.85%	1,746	25.17%	1,107	15.96%	822	11.85%	6,937
Lane	237	38.10%	158	25.40%	155	24.92%	72	11.58%	79	12.70%	622
Leavenworth	3,099	39.97%	2,562	33.05%	1,778	22.93%	314	4.05%	537	6.93%	7,753
Lincoln	1,091	44.93%	381	15.69%	853	35.13%	103	4.24%	238	9.80%	2,428
Linn	1,283	35.82%	858	23.95%	1,052	29.37%	389	10.86%	231	6.45%	3,582
Logan	259	31.55%	166	20.22%	315	38.37%	81	9.87%	-56	-6.82%	821
Lyon	2,363	42.77%	962	17.41%	1,878	33.99%	322	5.83%	485	8.78%	5,525
Marion	1,732	40.10%	863	19.98%	1,500	34.73%	224	5.19%	232	5.37%	4,319
Marshall	2,278	41.20%	1,492	26.98%	1,581	28.59%	178	3.22%	697	12.61%	5,529
McPherson	1,639	35.27%	455	9.79%	2,406	51.78%	147	3.16%	-767	-16.51%	4,647
Meade	383	34.29%	204	18.26%	418	37.42%	112	10.03%	-35	-3.13%	1,117
Miami	1,919	44.05%	1,033	23.71%	1,165	26.74%	239	5.49%	754	17.31%	4,356
Mitchell	1,441	43.13%	737	22.06%	951	28.46%	212	6.35%	490	14.67%	3,341
Montgomery	3,011	33.56%	1,842	20.53%	2,924	32.59%	1,194	13.31%	87	0.97%	8,971
Morris	1,144	38.73%	487	16.49%	1,244	42.11%	79	2.67%	-100	-3.39%	2,954
Morton	144	40.79%	120	33.99%	64	18.13%	25	7.08%	24	6.80%	353
Nemaha	1,936	44.71%	961	22.19%	1,393	32.17%	40	0.92%	543	12.54%	4,330
Neosho	1,993	38.07%	1,580	30.18%	1,190	22.73%	472	9.02%	413	7.89%	5,235
Ness	458	35.78%	232	18.13%	464	36.25%	126	9.84%	-6	-0.47%	1,280
Norton	1,081	43.34%	598	23.98%	674	27.02%	141	5.65%	407	16.32%	2,494
Osage	1,969	40.82%	850	17.62%	1,588	32.92%	417	8.64%	381	7.90%	4,824
Osborne	972	35.51%	733	26.78%	915	33.43%	117	4.27%	57	2.08%	2,737
Ottawa	1,264	44.68%	517	18.28%	899	31.78%	149	5.27%	365	12.90%	2,829
Pawnee	1,050	46.63%	366	16.25%	759	33.70%	77	3.42%	291	12.92%	2,252
Phillips	1,257	39.59%	594	18.71%	1,181	37.20%	143	4.50%	76	2.39%	3,175
Pottawatomie	1,599	37.93%	1,058	25.09%	1,504	35.67%	55	1.30%	95	2.25%	4,216
Pratt	947	38.32%	372	15.05%	984	39.82%	168	6.80%	-37	-1.50%	2,471
Rawlins	568	42.93%	220	16.63%	354	26.76%	181	13.68%	214	16.18%	1,323
Reno	3,360	42.13%	1,668	20.92%	2,502	31.37%	445	5.58%	858	10.76%	7,975
Republic	1,816	44.12%	895	21.74%	1,278	31.05%	127	3.09%	538	13.07%	4,116
Rice	1,314	38.77%	697	20.57%	1,186	35.00%	192	5.67%	128	3.78%	3,389
Riley	1,170	30.67%	425	11.14%	2,047	53.66%	173	4.53%	-877	-22.99%	3,815
Rooks	865	38.31%	545	24.14%	715	31.67%	133	5.89%	150	6.64%	2,258
Rush	870	47.52%	210	11.47%	659	35.99%	92	5.02%	211	11.52%	1,831
Russell	983	39.96%	416	16.91%	993	40.37%	68	2.76%	-10	-0.41%	2,460
Saline	2,263	47.23%	534	11.15%	1,773	37.01%	221	4.61%	490	10.23%	4,791
Scott	247	40.76%	56	9.24%	232	38.28%	71	11.72%	15	2.48%	606
Sedgwick	5,752	39.61%	1,419	9.77%	6,546	45.08%	804	5.54%	-794	-5.47%	14,521
Seward	394	38.07%	155	14.98%	355	34.30%	131	12.66%	39	3.77%	1,035
Shawnee	5,094	38.76%	3,592	27.33%	4,057	30.87%	398	3.03%	1,037	7.89%	13,141
Sheridan	509	47.48%	195	18.19%	316	29.48%	52	4.85%	193	18.00%	1,072
Sherman	465	47.26%	129	13.11%	290	29.47%	100	10.16%	175	17.78%	984
Smith	1,534	40.86%	970	25.84%	1,022	27.22%	228	6.07%	512	13.64%	3,754
Stafford	1,094	41.85%	422	16.14%	938	35.88%	160	6.12%	156	5.97%	2,614
Stanton	114	43.18%	42	15.91%	77	29.17%	31	11.74%	37	14.02%	264
Stevens	237	39.17%	117	19.34%	214	35.37%	37	6.12%	23	3.80%	605
Sumner	2,557	39.97%	781	12.21%	2,615	40.87%	445	6.96%	-58	-0.91%	6,398
Thomas	432	48.16%	127	14.16%	259	28.87%	79	8.81%	173	19.29%	897
Trego	449	40.23%	160	14.34%	417	37.37%	90	8.06%	32	2.87%	1,116
Wabaunsee	1,128	38.63%	783	26.82%	936	32.05%	73	2.50%	192	6.58%	2,920
Wallace	152	28.46%	81	15.17%	264	49.44%	37	6.93%	-112	-20.97%	534
Washington	1,914	41.01%	1,326	28.41%	1,314	28.16%	113	2.42%	588	12.60%	4,667
Wichita	135	36.39%	82	22.10%	113	30.46%	41	11.05%	22	5.93%	371
Wilson	1,304	30.60%	849	19.92%	1,415	33.21%	693	16.26%	-111	-2.61%	4,261
Woodson	900	37.78%	694	29.14%	608	25.52%	180	7.56%	206	8.65%	2,382
Wyandotte	7,370	39.10%	2,107	11.18%	8,109	43.02%	1,262	6.70%	-739	-3.92%	18,848
Totals	143,663	39.30%	74,845	20.47%	120,210	32.88%	26,842	7.34%	68,818	23,453	365,560

== See also ==
- United States presidential elections in Kansas
