= 1912 United States presidential election in North Dakota =

- November 5, 1912

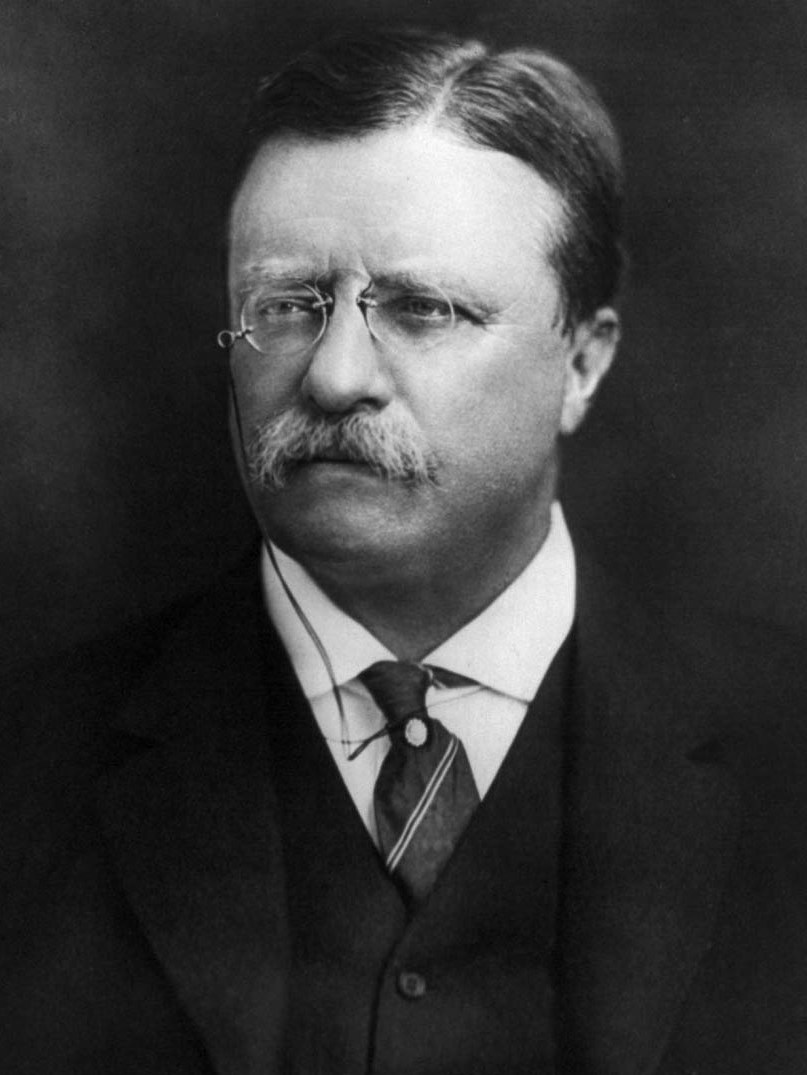

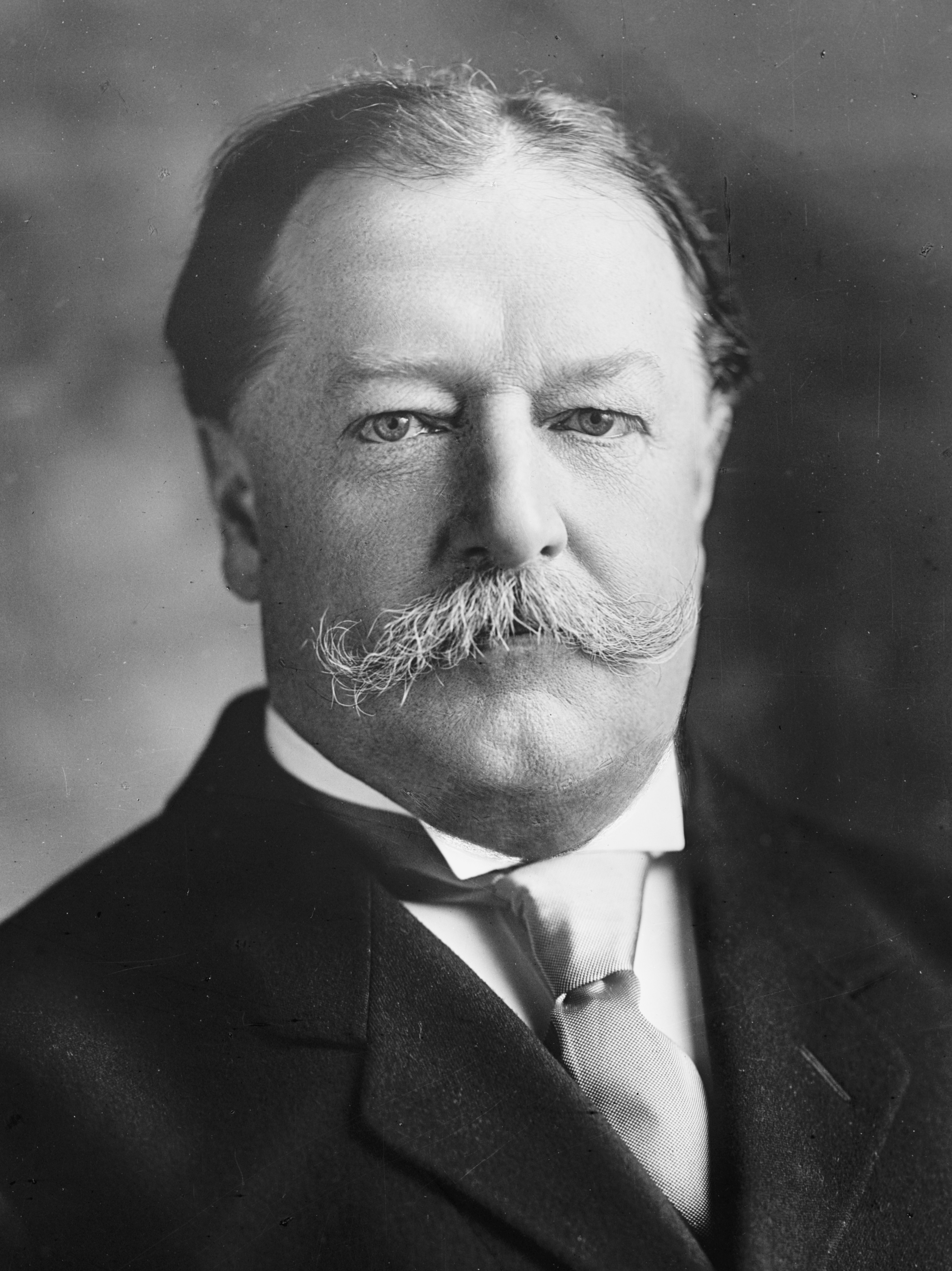

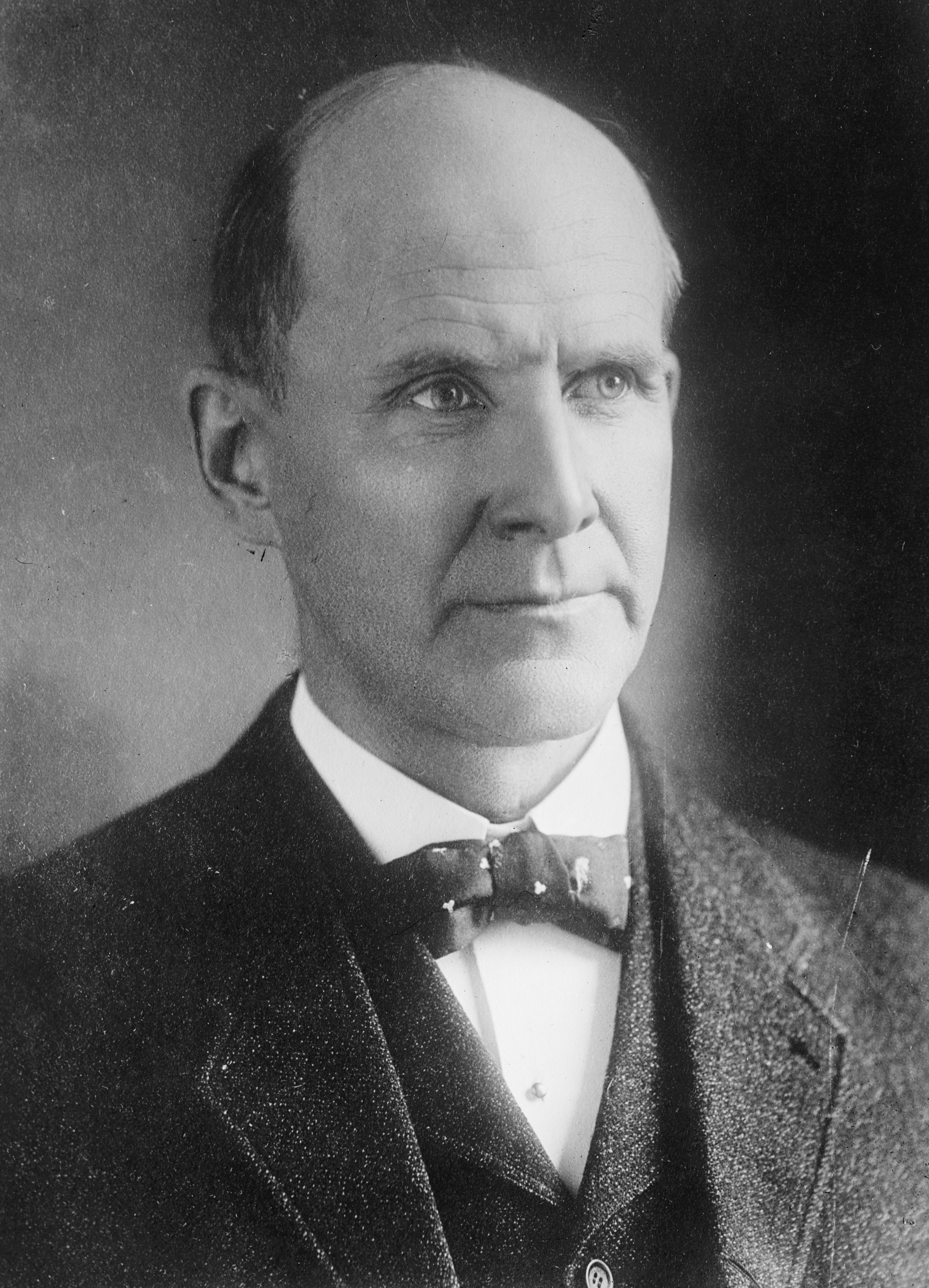
Nominee	Woodrow Wilson	Theodore Roosevelt
Party	Democratic	Progressive
Home state	New Jersey	New York
Running mate	Thomas R. Marshall	Hiram Johnson
Electoral vote	5	0
Popular vote	29,555	25,726
Percentage	34.14%	29.71%
Nominee	William Howard Taft	Eugene V. Debs
Party	Republican	Socialist
Home state	Ohio	Indiana
Running mate	Nicholas Murray Butler	Emil Seidel
Electoral vote	0	0
Popular vote	23,090	6,966
Percentage	26.67%	8.05%
County results
Wilson
20–30%
30–40%
40–50%
Roosevelt
30–40%
40–50%
50–60%
60–70%
Taft
20–30%
30–40%
Debs
20–30%
President before election
William Howard Taft
Republican
Elected President
Woodrow Wilson
Democratic

The 1912 United States presidential election in North Dakota took place on November 5, 1912, as part of the 1912 United States presidential election. Voters chose five representatives, or electors, to the Electoral College, who voted for president and vice president.

North Dakota was won by Princeton University President Woodrow Wilson (D–Virginia), running with governor of Indiana Thomas R. Marshall, with 34.14% of the popular vote, against the 26th president of the United States Theodore Roosevelt (P–New York), running with governor of California Hiram Johnson, with 29.71% of the popular vote, the 27th president of the United States William Howard Taft (R–Ohio), running with Columbia University President Nicholas Murray Butler, with 26.67% of the popular vote and the five-time candidate of the Socialist Party of America for president Eugene V. Debs (S–Indiana), running with the first Socialist mayor of a major city in the United States, Emil Seidel, with 8.05 percent of the popular vote.

As a result of his win in the state, Wilson became the first Democratic presidential candidate to outright carry North Dakota, although Grover Cleveland did receive an electoral vote under a fusion ticket run in the state's first presidential election two decades earlier. He would later win the state again four years later. This election marks the last time four different candidates won at least one county within one individual state. This feat would be shared by Kansas in the same election; however, the only other occurrences in presidential election history have been in Missouri in 1860, and in Illinois and Virginia in 1824.

== Primary elections ==
The first state-wide presidential preference primaries were held in North Dakota on March 19, 1912. Under North Dakota law, a candidate could be placed on a party's primary ballot by petition. A candidate needed the signatures of 5% of registered party members in each congressional district. Three days were allowed to object to signatures. Only John Burke appeared on the Democratic Party ballot. The Republican Party ballot included William Howard Taft, Theodore Roosevelt, and Robert M. La Follette.

=== Democratic Party ===
1912 North Dakota Democratic presidential primary
- March 19, 1912
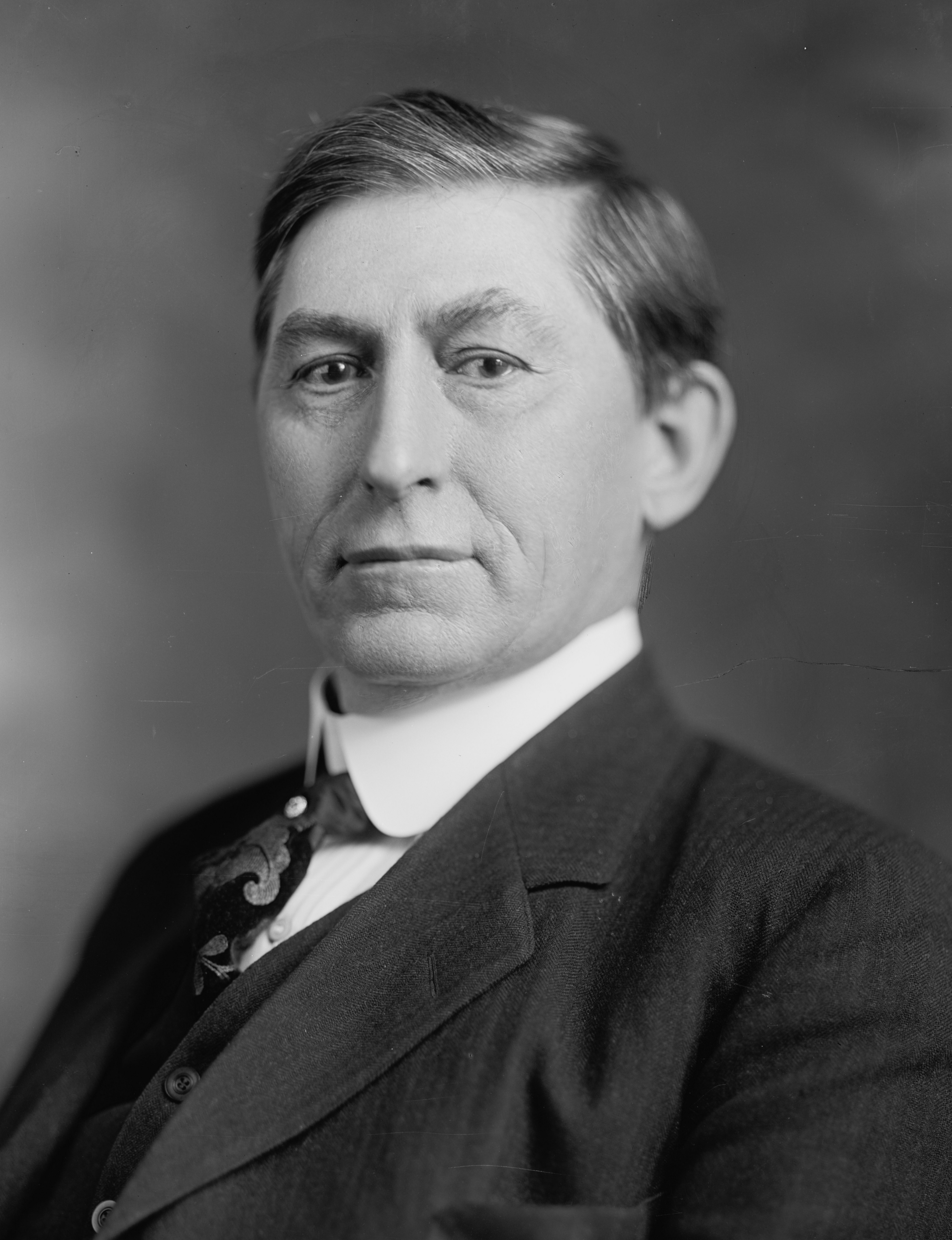
Candidate	John Burke
Home state	North Dakota
Delegate count	10
Popular vote	9,357
Percentage	100%
- County results Burke: 100%

A primary for the Democratic presidential candidate was held in North Dakota on March 19, 1912. Only John Burke appeared on the ballot for the Democratic primary, allowing him to receive all 9,357 votes.

1912 North Dakota Democratic presidential primary
Party	Candidate	Votes	%
Democratic	John Burke	9,357	100%
Total votes		9,357	100%

=== Republican Party ===
1912 North Dakota Republican presidential primary
- March 19, 1912
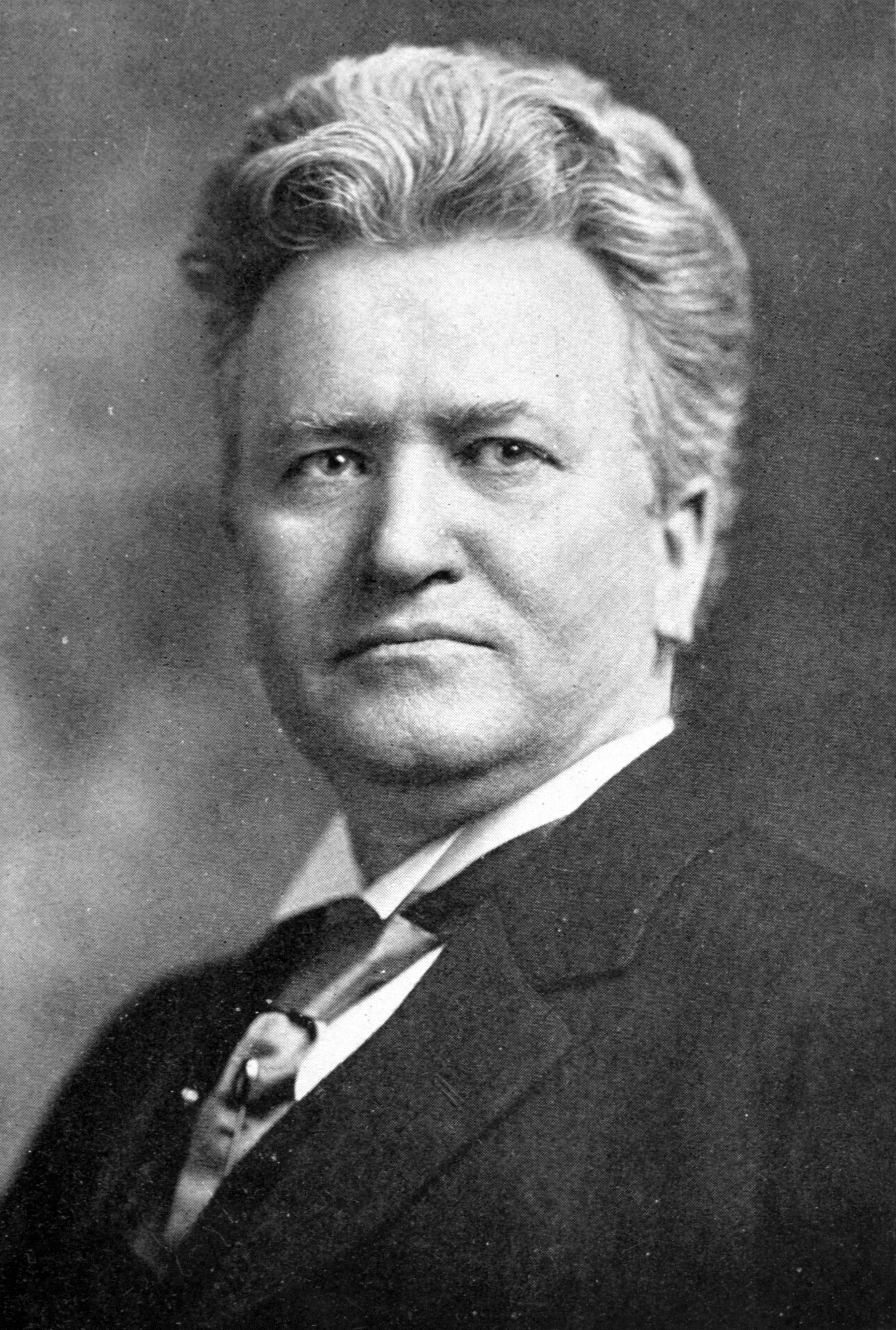

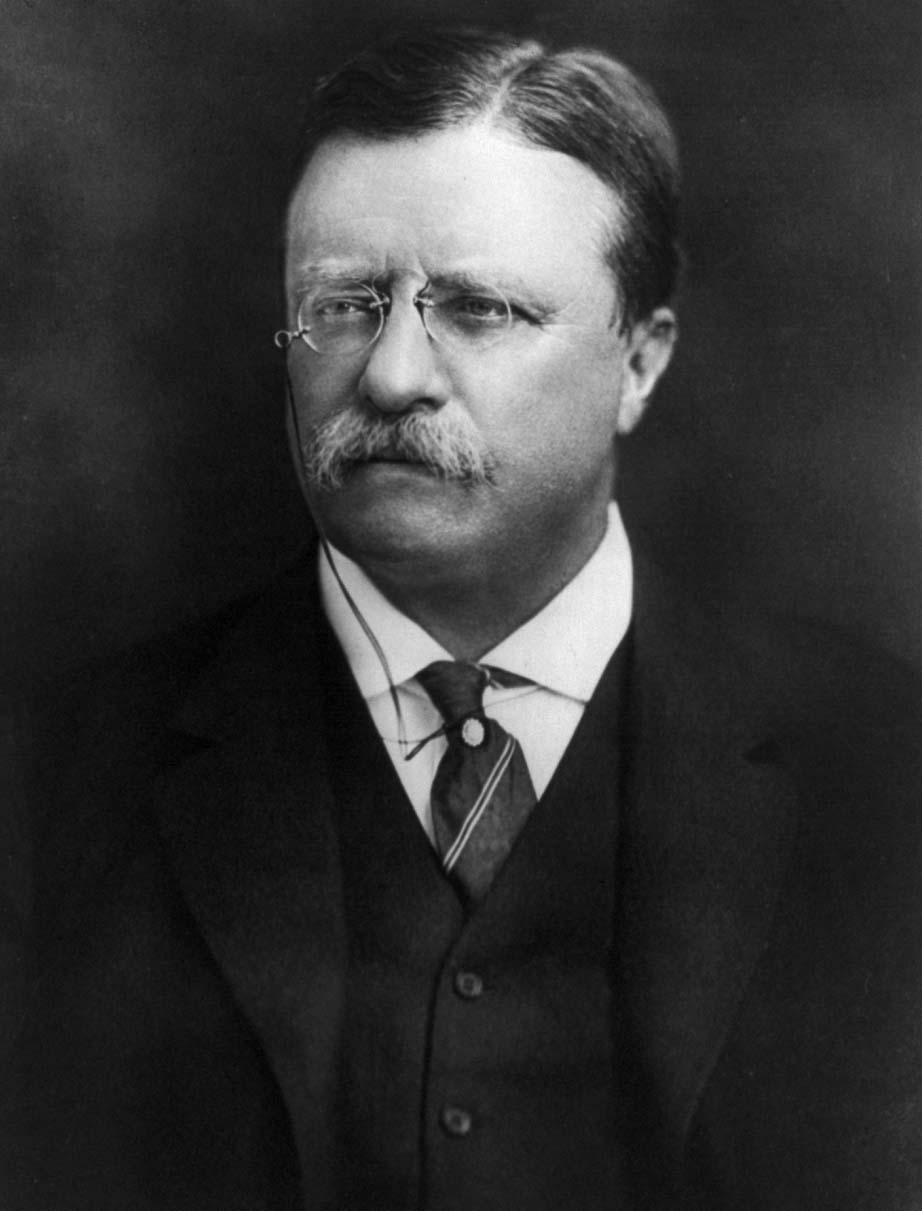
Candidate	Robert M. La Follette	Theodore Roosevelt
Home state	Wisconsin	New York
Delegate count	10	0
Popular vote	34,123	23,669
Percentage	57.19%	39.67%
Election results by county
La Follette:
40-50%
50-60%
60-70%
70-80%
Roosevelt:
40-50%
50-60%
60-70%
70-80%
80-90%

A primary for the Republican presidential candidate was held in North Dakota on March 19, 1912. The state's progressive organization, led by Senator Asle Gronna, had committed to La Follette in 1911, while the conservative faction of the party under L. B. Hanna supported Roosevelt. La Follette committees had been active for months in nearly every precinct, whereas Roosevelt organizers were slow to establish a presence in the state. John F. Bass, brother of New Hampshire governor Robert P. Bass, was sent to manage Roosevelt's campaign in the state, which displeased some of his supporters who viewed Bass as an outsider.

La Follette won the primary with 34,123 votes to Roosevelt's 23,669 and Taft's 1,876, bounding all 10 delegates to vote for him in the convention. Following Roosevelt's defeat, Bass claimed that "our reports indicate that practically all the Democrats have voted for La Fol-lette. If the Democrats had stayed out of the Republican primary there is no question that Roosevelt would have won."

According to an analysis of some of the early returns by The New York Times, La Follette received approximately 80 percent of the Norwegian vote in the six big valley counties, and drew strong support in the communities where he had spoken during the week before the primary.

1912 North Dakota Republican presidential primary
Party	Candidate	Votes	%
Republican	Robert M. La Follette	34,123	57.19%
Republican	Theodore Roosevelt	23,669	39.67%
Republican	William Howard Taft	1,876	3.14%
Total votes		59,668	100%

== Results ==
1912 United States presidential election in North Dakota
Party	Candidate	Votes	%
Democratic	Woodrow Wilson	29,555	34.14%
Progressive	Theodore Roosevelt	25,726	29.71%
Republican	William Howard Taft (incumbent)	23,090	26.67%
Socialist	Eugene V. Debs	6,966	8.05%
Prohibition	Eugene W. Chafin	1,243	1.44%
Total votes		86,580	100%

=== Results by county ===
County	Woodrow Wilson Democratic		William Howard Taft Republican		Theodore Roosevelt Progressive "Bull Moose"		Eugene V. Debs Socialist		Eugene W. Chafin Prohibition		Margin		Total votes cast
County	#	%	#	%	#	%	#	%	#	%	#	%	Total votes cast
Adams	249	29.33%	205	24.15%	305	35.92%	63	7.42%	27	3.18%	-56	-6.59%	849
Barnes	940	40.76%	570	24.72%	655	28.40%	93	4.03%	48	2.08%	285	12.36%	2,306
Benson	594	30.14%	515	26.13%	716	36.33%	98	4.97%	48	2.44%	-122	-6.19%	1,971
Billings	547	28.80%	671	35.33%	495	26.07%	161	8.48%	25	1.32%	-124	-6.53%	1,899
Bottineau	825	31.76%	700	26.94%	625	24.06%	401	15.43%	47	1.81%	125	4.82%	2,598
Bowman	361	34.88%	302	29.18%	258	24.93%	99	9.57%	15	1.45%	59	5.70%	1,035
Burke	308	27.50%	264	23.57%	207	18.48%	320	28.57%	21	1.88%	-12	-1.07%	1,120
Burleigh	609	30.62%	720	36.20%	552	27.75%	92	4.63%	16	0.80%	-111	-5.58%	1,989
Cass	1,814	36.14%	1,316	26.22%	1,669	33.25%	164	3.27%	56	1.12%	145	2.89%	5,019
Cavalier	932	39.98%	561	24.07%	746	32.00%	69	2.96%	23	0.99%	186	7.98%	2,331
Dickey	723	43.77%	494	29.90%	354	21.43%	69	4.18%	12	0.73%	229	13.87%	1,652
Divide	375	26.54%	404	28.59%	459	32.48%	160	11.32%	15	1.06%	-55	-3.89%	1,413
Dunn	246	27.95%	285	32.39%	297	33.75%	47	5.34%	5	0.57%	-12	-1.36%	880
Eddy	376	41.32%	199	21.87%	290	31.87%	34	3.74%	11	1.21%	86	9.45%	910
Emmons	524	38.90%	410	30.44%	374	27.77%	24	1.78%	15	1.11%	114	8.46%	1,347
Foster	403	42.38%	285	29.97%	232	24.40%	20	2.10%	11	1.16%	118	12.41%	951
Grand Forks	1,492	37.31%	955	23.88%	1,327	33.18%	180	4.50%	45	1.13%	165	4.13%	3,999
Griggs	434	43.62%	144	14.47%	314	31.56%	65	6.53%	38	3.82%	120	12.06%	995
Hettinger	381	32.51%	442	37.71%	288	24.57%	47	4.01%	14	1.19%	-61	-5.20%	1,172
Kidder	218	26.14%	322	38.61%	210	25.18%	65	7.79%	19	2.28%	-104	-12.47%	834
LaMoure	588	38.61%	436	28.63%	419	27.51%	65	4.27%	15	0.98%	152	9.98%	1,523
Logan	146	21.66%	269	39.91%	225	33.38%	30	4.45%	4	0.59%	-44	-6.53%	674
McHenry	959	38.44%	589	23.61%	672	26.93%	246	9.86%	29	1.16%	287	11.51%	2,495
McIntosh	125	12.98%	202	20.98%	607	63.03%	25	2.60%	4	0.42%	-405	-42.05%	963
McKenzie	293	28.31%	285	27.54%	228	22.03%	219	21.16%	10	0.97%	8	0.77%	1,035
McLean	583	29.59%	505	25.63%	526	26.70%	325	16.50%	31	1.57%	57	2.89%	1,970
Mercer	142	19.27%	147	19.95%	389	52.78%	53	7.19%	6	0.81%	242	32.83%	737
Morton	1,017	28.11%	1,011	27.94%	1,262	34.88%	284	7.85%	44	1.22%	-245	-6.77%	3,618
Mountrail	307	21.16%	407	28.05%	347	23.91%	372	25.64%	18	1.24%	-35	-2.41%	1,451
Nelson	526	30.92%	448	26.34%	511	30.04%	178	10.46%	38	2.23%	15	0.88%	1,701
Oliver	139	24.05%	131	22.66%	178	30.80%	116	20.07%	14	2.42%	-39	-6.75%	578
Pembina	975	39.24%	615	24.75%	807	32.47%	35	1.41%	53	2.13%	168	6.77%	2,485
Pierce	453	38.42%	264	22.39%	276	23.41%	159	13.49%	27	2.29%	177	15.01%	1,179
Ramsey	917	39.94%	739	32.19%	472	20.56%	150	6.53%	18	0.78%	178	7.75%	2,296
Ransom	490	30.90%	495	31.21%	540	34.05%	30	1.89%	31	1.95%	-45	-2.84%	1,586
Renville	420	32.97%	224	17.58%	341	26.77%	272	21.35%	17	1.33%	79	6.20%	1,274
Richland	1,380	42.65%	1,034	31.95%	742	22.93%	34	1.05%	46	1.42%	346	10.70%	3,236
Rolette	396	31.23%	339	26.74%	322	25.39%	184	14.51%	27	2.13%	57	4.49%	1,268
Sargent	641	39.20%	605	37.00%	277	16.94%	93	5.69%	19	1.16%	36	2.20%	1,635
Sheridan	170	17.78%	306	32.01%	447	46.76%	26	2.72%	7	0.73%	-141	-14.75%	956
Stark	678	39.24%	387	22.40%	597	34.55%	58	3.36%	8	0.46%	81	4.69%	1,728
Steele	253	25.17%	237	23.58%	444	44.18%	55	5.47%	16	1.59%	-191	-19.01%	1,005
Stutsman	1,100	41.12%	757	28.30%	706	26.39%	84	3.14%	28	1.05%	343	12.82%	2,675
Towner	532	39.88%	352	26.39%	317	23.76%	112	8.40%	21	1.57%	180	13.49%	1,334
Traill	507	29.24%	365	21.05%	755	43.54%	68	3.92%	39	2.25%	-248	-14.30%	1,734
Walsh	1,206	41.85%	586	20.33%	868	30.12%	185	6.42%	37	1.28%	338	11.73%	2,882
Ward	1,071	30.58%	686	19.59%	1,065	30.41%	613	17.50%	67	1.91%	6	0.17%	3,502
Wells	494	32.72%	356	23.58%	611	40.46%	36	2.38%	13	0.86%	-117	-7.74%	1,510
Williams	696	30.53%	549	24.08%	402	17.63%	588	25.79%	45	1.97%	147	6.45%	2,280
Totals	29,555	34.14%	23,090	26.67%	25,726	29.71%	6,966	8.05%	1,243	1.44%	3,829	4.43%	86,580

== See also ==
- United States presidential elections in North Dakota
