= Salt River, Missouri =

Unincorporated community in Missouri, United States

Coordinates: 39°34′58″N 91°18′20″W

Salt River is an unincorporated community in Ralls County, in the U.S. state of Missouri.

The community takes its name from the nearby Salt River.

Hosea T. Botts, who was the mayor of Tillamook, Oregon from 1905 to 1907, was born in Salt River.
