= Saverton Township, Ralls County, Missouri =

Inactive township in the American state of Missouri

Coordinates: 39.6175°N 91.2919°W

Saverton Township is an inactive township in Ralls County, in the U.S. state of Missouri.

Saverton Township takes its name from the community of Saverton, Missouri.
