= Round Grove Township =

Round Grove Township may refer to:

- Round Grove Township, Livingston County, Illinois
- Round Grove Township, White County, Indiana
- Round Grove Township, McLeod County, Minnesota
- Round Grove Township, Macon County, Missouri
- Round Grove Township, Marion County, Missouri
