= Madisonville, Missouri =

Unincorporated community in Missouri, United States

Coordinates: 39°27′26″N 91°29′48″W

Madisonville is an unincorporated community in Ralls County, in the U.S. state of Missouri. The community lies approximately four miles southeast of Center and on the banks of Spencer Creek.

== History ==
Madisonville was platted in 1836, and named after James Madison Croswaite, the sibling of a first settler. A post office called Madisonville was established in 1838, and remained in operation until 1906.
