= Huntington, Missouri =

Unincorporated community in Missouri, United States

Coordinates: 39.6614322°N 91.5987682°W

Huntington is an unincorporated community in Ralls County, in the U.S. state of Missouri.

== History ==
A post office called Huntington was established in 1878, and remained in operation until 1969. The community has the name of Collis Potter Huntington, a railroad magnate.
