= West Hartford, Missouri =

Unincorporated community in Missouri, United States

Coordinates: 39°24′38″N 91°36′20″W

West Hartford is an unincorporated community in Ralls County, in the U.S. state of Missouri.

== History ==
A post office called West Hartford was established in 1870, and remained in operation until 1902. The community takes its name from Hartford, Connecticut, the native home of a first settler.
