= Hassard, Missouri =

Unincorporated community in Missouri, United States

Coordinates: 39°39′25″N 91°39′35″W

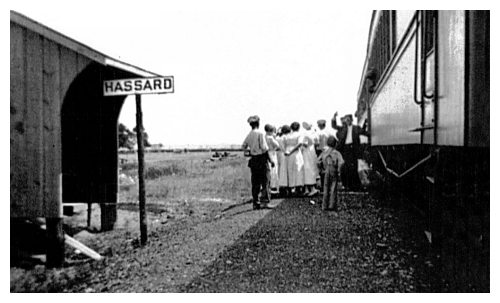
Hassard, MO Wabash Railroad flag stop shelter

Hassard is an unincorporated community in northwest Ralls County, in the U.S. state of Missouri. It is on Missouri Route J and approximately four miles east of Monroe City in adjacent Monroe County.

== History ==
A post office called Hussard was established in 1872, and remained in operation until 1895. The community has the name of one Mr. Hassard, a railroad employee.
