= Sheil, Missouri =

Unincorporated community in Missouri, United States

Coordinates: 39°38′02″N 91°35′55″W

Sheil is an unincorporated community in Ralls County, in the U.S. state of Missouri.

== History ==
Variant names were "Shiel" and "Sydney". A post office operated under the name "Sydney" as early as 1855. The name was changed to "Shiel" in 1898, and the post office was discontinued in 1910. Shiel was named after a local priest.
