= Saline Township, Ralls County, Missouri =

Inactive township in the American state of Missouri

Coordinates: 39.6142°N 91.6492°W

Saline Township is an inactive township in Ralls County, in the U.S. state of Missouri.

Saline Township was so named on account of the abundance of natural salt within its borders.
