= 1824 United States presidential election in Virginia =

- October 26 – December 2, 1824
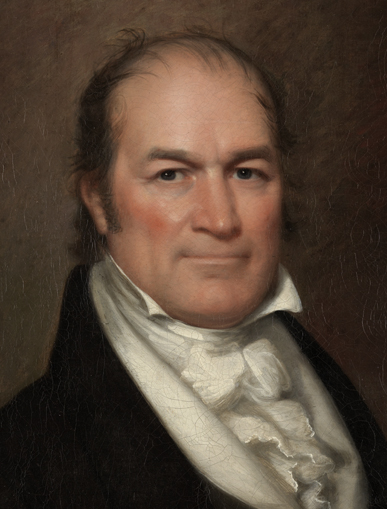

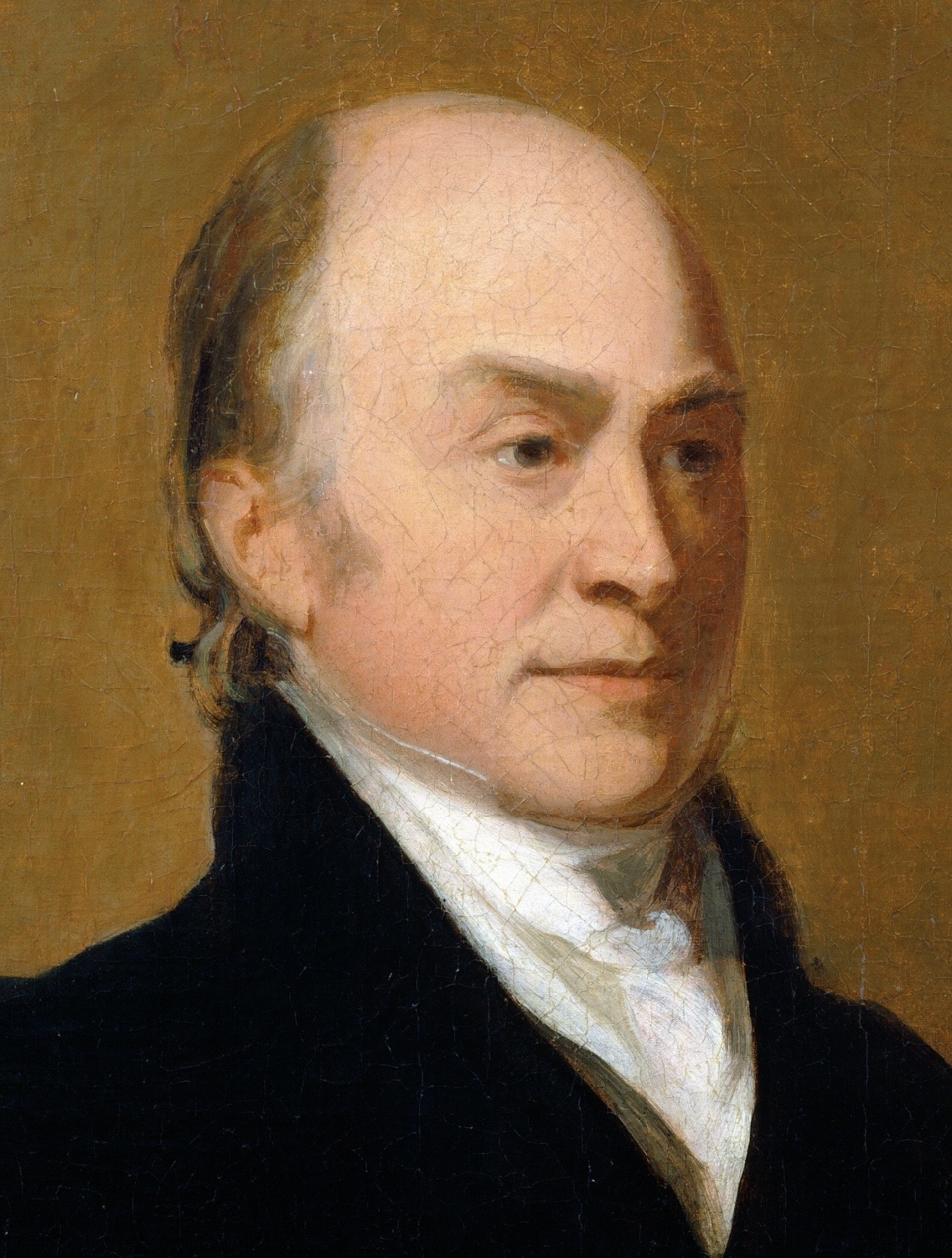

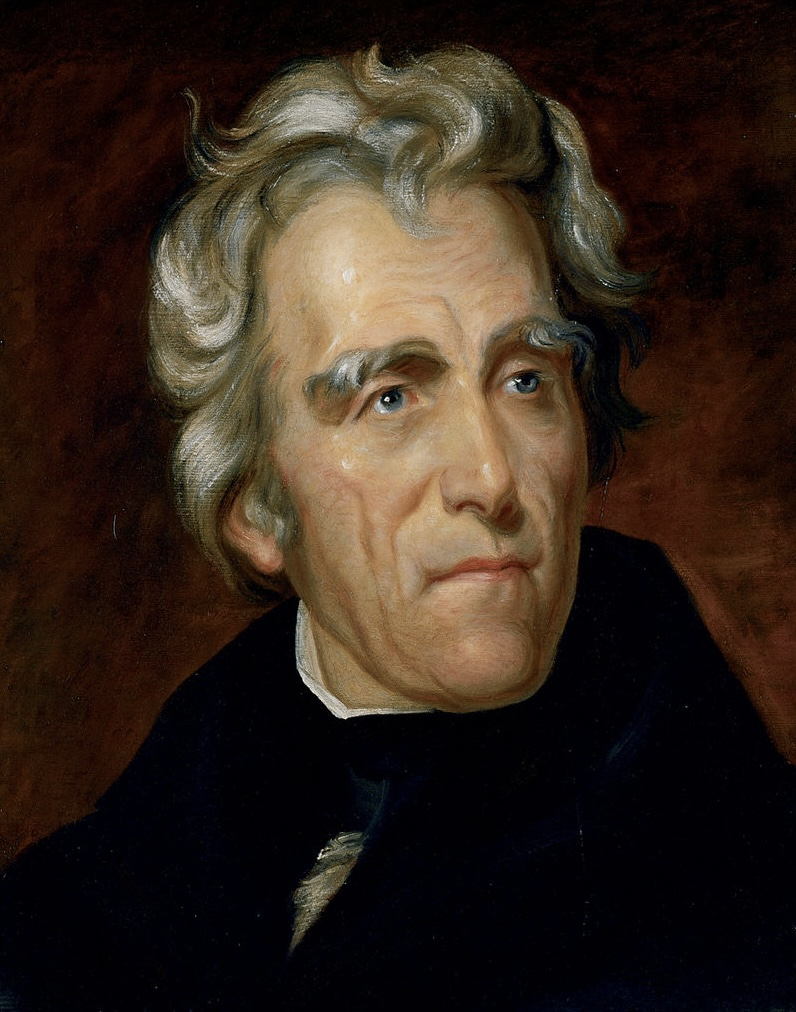
Nominee	William H. Crawford	John Quincy Adams	Andrew Jackson
Party	Democratic-Republican	Democratic-Republican	Democratic-Republican
Home state	Georgia	Massachusetts	Tennessee
Running mate	Nathaniel Macon	John C. Calhoun	John C. Calhoun
Electoral vote	24	0	0
Popular vote	8,558	3,419	2,975
Percentage	55.68%	22.24%	19.35%
- County results Crawford 30–40% 40–50% 50–60% 60–70% 70–80% 80–90% 90–100% Adams 30–40% 40–50% 50–60% 60–70% 70–80% Jackson 40–50% 50–60% 60–70% 70–80% Clay 30–40% 80–90% Tie 40–50% No Data/Vote
President before election
James Monroe
Democratic-Republican
Elected President
John Quincy Adams
Democratic-Republican

The 1824 United States presidential election in Virginia took place between October 26 and December 2, 1824, as part of the 1824 United States presidential election. Voters chose 24 representatives, or electors to the Electoral College, who voted for President and Vice President.

During this election, the Democratic-Republican Party was the only major national party, and 4 candidates from this party sought the Presidency. Virginia voted for William H. Crawford over John Quincy Adams, Andrew Jackson, and Henry Clay. Crawford won Virginia by a margin of 33.44%. This was the first presidential election that four candidates each won at least one county in the same state. This feat would be shared by Illinois in the same election; however, the only other occurrences in presidential election history have been in 1860 (in Missouri), and in 1912 (in North Dakota and in Kansas).

== Results ==
1824 United States presidential election in Virginia
Party	Candidate	Votes	Percentage	Electoral votes
Democratic-Republican	William H. Crawford	8,558	55.68%	24
Democratic-Republican	John Quincy Adams	3,419	22.24%	0
Democratic-Republican	Andrew Jackson	2,975	19.35%	0
Democratic-Republican	Henry Clay	419	2.73%	0
Totals		15,371	100.0%	24

== See also ==
- United States presidential elections in Virginia
