= 1824 United States presidential election in Illinois =

- October 26 – December 2, 1824
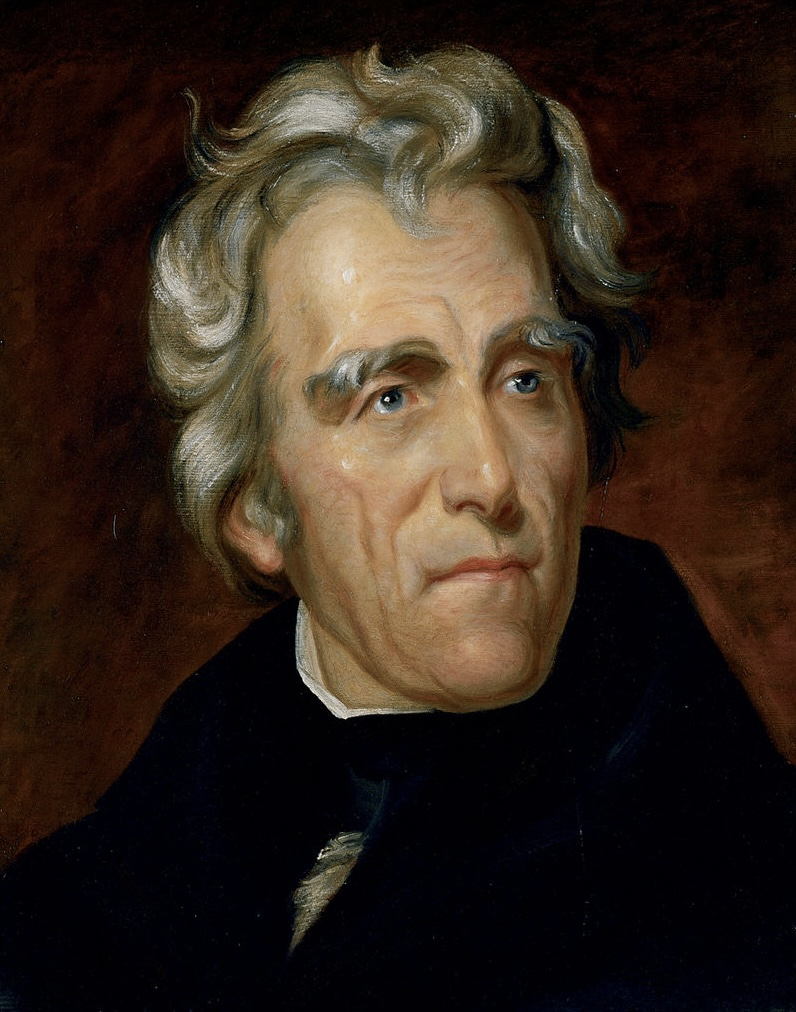

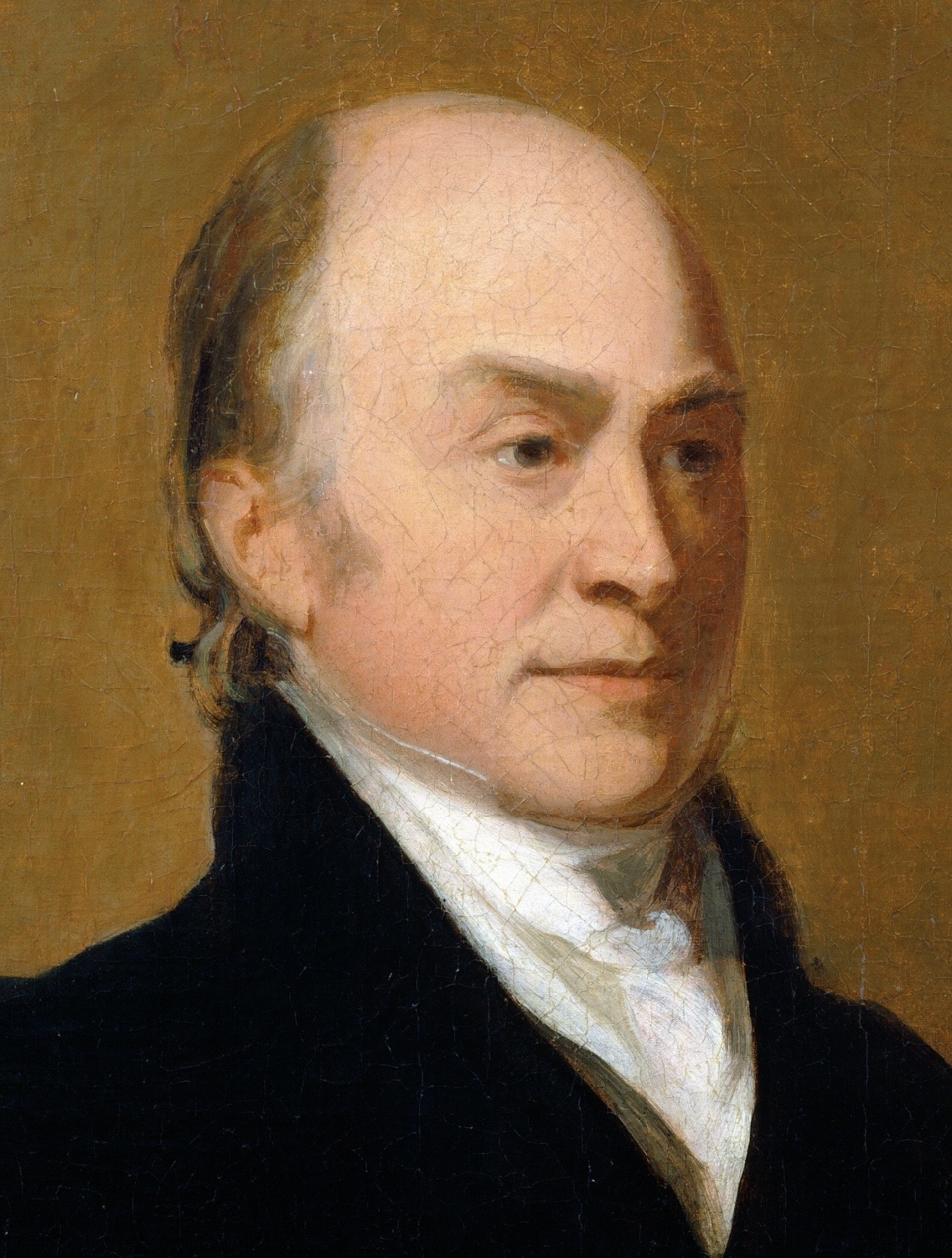

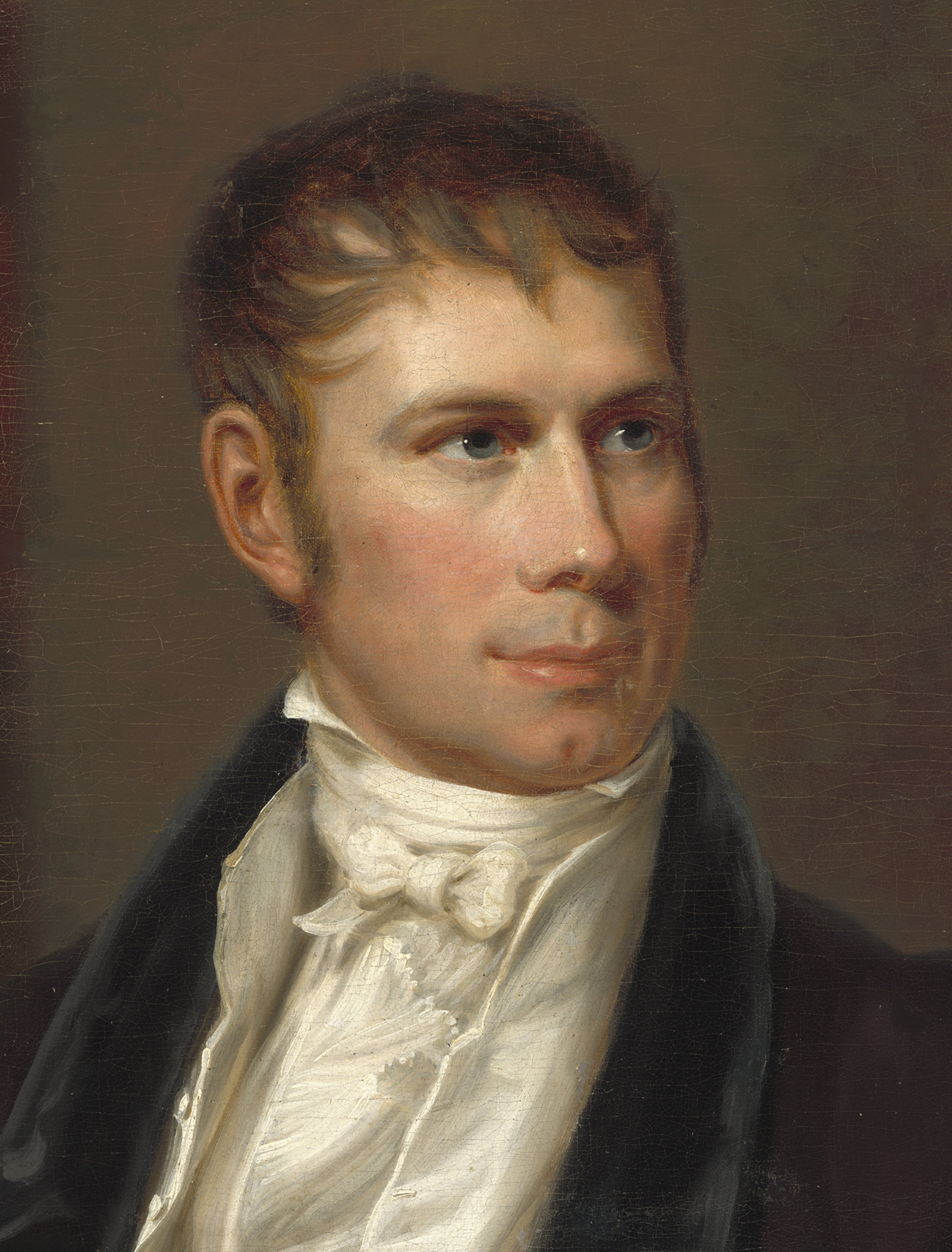

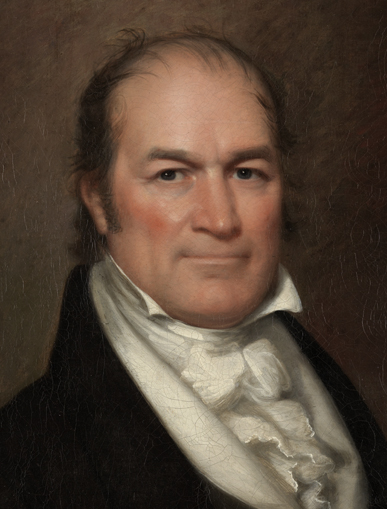
Nominee	Andrew Jackson	John Quincy Adams
Party	Democratic-Republican	Democratic-Republican
Home state	Tennessee	Massachusetts
Running mate	John C. Calhoun	John C. Calhoun
Electoral vote	2	1
Popular vote	1,272	1,541
Percentage	27.02%	32.73%
Nominee	Henry Clay	William H. Crawford
Party	Democratic-Republican	Democratic-Republican
Home state	Kentucky	Georgia
Running mate	Nathan Sanford	Nathaniel Macon
Electoral vote	0	0
Popular vote	1,047	847
Percentage	22.24%	17.99%
- Jackson 30–40% 40–50% 50–60% 70–80% 80–90% Adams 40–50% 50–60% 60–70% 90–100% Clay 50–60% Crawford 40–50% 50–60% 60–70% Unknown/No Vote
President before election
James Monroe
Democratic-Republican
Elected President
John Quincy Adams
Democratic-Republican

The 1824 United States presidential election in Illinois took place between October 26 and December 2, 1824, as part of the 1824 United States presidential election. Voters chose three representatives, or electors to the Electoral College, who voted for President and Vice President.

During this election, the Democratic-Republican Party was the only major national party, and four different candidates from this party sought the Presidency. Although Illinois voted for John Quincy Adams over Andrew Jackson, Henry Clay, and William H. Crawford, the district-based system used for choosing electors meant that only one of the state's electoral votes were assigned to Adams, while the remaining two were assigned to Jackson. This was the first presidential election that four candidates each won at least one county in the same state. This feat would be shared by Virginia in the same election; however, the only other occurrences in presidential election history have been in 1860 (in Missouri), and in 1912 (in North Dakota and in Kansas).

== Results ==
1824 United States presidential election in Illinois
Party	Candidate	Votes	Percentage	Electoral votes
Democratic-Republican	Andrew Jackson	1,272	27.02%	2
Democratic-Republican	John Quincy Adams	1,541	32.73%	1
Democratic-Republican	Henry Clay	1,047	22.24%	0
Democratic-Republican	William H. Crawford	847	17.99%	0
Unknown	Unpledged electors	1	0.02%	0
Totals		4,708	100.0%	3

=== Results by electoral district ===
Results by District
District	Andrew Jackson Democratic-Republican			John Quincy Adams Democratic-Republican			Henry Clay Democratic-Republican			William H. Crawford Democratic-Republican			Unpledged Electors			Total votes cast
District	#	%	Electors	#	%	Electors	#	%	Electors	#	%	Electors	#	%	Electors	Total votes cast
1 (Note: The Jackson vote in this district was split between 2 electors)	109	5.08	0	1,063	49.56	1	343	15.99	0	629	29.32	0	1	0.05	0	2,145
2 (Note: The Jackson vote in this district was split between 3 electors and the Clay vote was split between 2 electors)	666	48.68	1	225	16.45	0	477	34.87	0	no candidates			no candidates			1,368
3 (Note: The Clay vote in this district was split between 2 electors)	497	41.59	1	253	21.17	0	227	19.00	0	218	18.24	0	no candidates			1,195
Total	1,272	27.02	2	1,541	32.73	1	1,047	22.24	0	847	17.99	0	1	0.02	0	4,708

== See also ==
- United States presidential elections in Illinois
