= Jasper Township, Ralls County, Missouri =

Inactive township in the American state of Missouri

Coordinates: 39.4039°N 91.5275°W

Jasper Township is an inactive township in Ralls County, in the U.S. state of Missouri.

Jasper Township has the name of Jasper Smith, an early settler.
