= Camp Creek (Salt River tributary) =

Stream in the U.S. state of Missouri

Coordinates: 39°36′32″N 91°22′43″W

Camp Creek is a stream in northern Ralls County, Missouri. It is a tributary of the Salt River.

Camp Creek was so named on account of a campground near its course.

== See also ==
- List of rivers of Missouri
