= Greenlawn, Missouri =

Unincorporated community in Missouri, United States

Coordinates: 39°28′39″N 91°41′11″W

Greenlawn is an unincorporated community in southwest Ralls County, in the U.S. state of Missouri. The community is on Missouri Route J approximately three miles north of Perry. The Lick Creek arm of Mark Twain Lake lies approximately one mile to the east.

== History ==
A post office called Greenlawn was established in 1888, and remained in operation until 1904. The community was so named on account of flat green fields near the original town site.
