= Union Township, Marion County, Missouri =

Township in Marion County, Missouri, U.S.

Coordinates: 39.8283°N 91.7369°W

Union Township is an inactive township in Marion County, in the U.S. state of Missouri.

Union Township was established in 1837.
