= Warren Township, Marion County, Missouri =

Township in Marion County, Missouri, U.S.

Coordinates: 39.7306°N 91.7494°W

Warren Township is an inactive township in Marion County, in the U.S. state of Missouri.

Warren Township was established in 1831, and named after Joseph Warren, perhaps via Warren County, Kentucky.
