= Spencer Creek (Salt River tributary) =

Stream in Missouri, U.S.

Spencer Creek is a stream in Ralls and Pike counties of the state of Missouri, and a tributary of the Salt River. The stream's headwaters arise in the western edge of Pike County adjacent to the south side of Missouri Route 154 about 7 miles (11 km) west of Curryville (at 39°20′49″N 91°26′11″W). The stream flows generally west passing about 2 miles (3.2 km) north of Vandalia then turns northwest crossing under Route 154 east of Liberty Hall. The stream then turns north then northeast and passes the village of Madisonville and continues roughly parallel to the boundary between Ralls and Pike counties. It enters briefly into Pike County just prior to passing under U.S. Route 61. It enters the Salt River about 4 miles (6.4 km) southeast of New London (at 39°33′10″N 91°20′00″W).

Spencer Creek has the name of William Spencer, a pioneer citizen.

== See also ==
- List of rivers of Missouri
