= South River Township, Marion County, Missouri =

Township in Marion County, Missouri, U.S.

Coordinates: 39.7167°N 91.5703°W

South River Township is an inactive township in Marion County, in the U.S. state of Missouri.

South River Township was established in 1836.
