= Round Grove Township, Marion County, Missouri =

Township in Marion County, Missouri, U.S.

Coordinates: 39.9028°N 91.7069°W

Round Grove Township is an inactive township in Marion County, in the U.S. state of Missouri.

Round Grove Township was established in 1833, and named for the shape of a grove within its borders.
