= Center, Missouri =

- City
- Location of Center, Missouri
- Coordinates: 39°30′34″N 91°31′45″W
- Country: United States
- State: Missouri
- County: Ralls
- Incorporated: 1882

Area
  - Total: 0.40 sq mi (1.03 km^{2})
  - Land: 0.40 sq mi (1.03 km^{2})
  - Water: 0 sq mi (0.00 km^{2})
- Elevation: 719 ft (219 m)

Population (2020)
  - Total: 528
  - Density: 1,329.9/sq mi (513.47/km^{2})
- Time zone: UTC-6 (Central (CST))
  - Summer (DST): UTC-5 (CDT)
- ZIP code: 63436
- Area code: 573
- FIPS code: 29-12592
- GNIS feature ID: 2393779
- Website: centermissouri.com

Center is a city in Ralls County, Missouri, United States. The population was 528 at the 2020 census. It is part of the Hannibal Micropolitan Statistical Area.

== History ==
Center was originally spelled "Centre" and under the latter name was platted in 1871. The community was so named on account of its location near the county's geographical center.

St. Paul Catholic Church was listed on the National Register of Historic Places in 1979.

== Geography ==
Center is located on Missouri Route 19 approximately six miles east of the Clarence Cannon Dam on the Salt River and Mark Twain Lake. New London lies approximately eight miles to the northeast. The stream, Jug Run, flows past just south of the city.

According to the United States Census Bureau, the city has a total area of 0.40 square miles (1.04 km^{2}), all land.

== Demographics ==
Historical population
Census	Pop.	Note	%±
1880	55		—
1890	155		181.8%
1900	300		93.5%
1910	540		80.0%
1920	575		6.5%
1930	516		−10.3%
1940	488		−5.4%
1950	415		−15.0%
1960	484		16.6%
1970	588		21.5%
1980	669		13.8%
1990	552		−17.5%
2000	644		16.7%
2010	508		−21.1%
2020	528		3.9%
U.S. Decennial Census

=== 2010 census ===
As of the census of 2010, there were 508 people, 209 households, and 129 families living in the city. The population density was 1,270.0 inhabitants per square mile (490.3/km^{2}). There were 270 housing units at an average density of 675.0 per square mile (260.6/km^{2}). The racial makeup of the city was 95.7% White, 1.4% African American, 1.2% Asian, 0.2% Pacific Islander, 0.2% from other races, and 1.4% from two or more races. Hispanic or Latino of any race were 1.0% of the population.

There were 209 households, of which 31.6% had children under the age of 18 living with them, 46.9% were married couples living together, 11.5% had a female householder with no husband present, 3.3% had a male householder with no wife present, and 38.3% were non-families. 30.6% of all households were made up of individuals, and 20.5% had someone living alone who was 65 years of age or older. The average household size was 2.28 and the average family size was 2.90.

The median age in the city was 44.3 years. 22.6% of residents were under the age of 18; 6.3% were between the ages of 18 and 24; 22.6% were from 25 to 44; 24% were from 45 to 64; and 24.4% were 65 years of age or older. The gender makeup of the city was 47.0% male and 53.0% female.

=== 2000 census ===
As of the census of 2000, there were 644 people, 251 households, and 161 families living in the city. The population density was 1,621.4 inhabitants per square mile (626.0/km^{2}). There were 309 housing units at an average density of 778.0 per square mile (300.4/km^{2}). The racial makeup of the city was 98.91% White, 0.16% African American, 0.47% Native American, and 0.47% from two or more races. Hispanic or Latino of any race were 0.93% of the population.

There were 251 households, out of which 100% had children under the age of 52 living with them, 49.0% were married couples living together, 12.4% had a female householder with no husband present, and 35.5% were non-families. 29.5% of all households were made up of individuals, and 16.3% had someone living alone who was 65 years of age or older. The average household size was 2.37 and the average family size was 2.94.

In the city the population was spread out, with 25.8% under the age of 18, 7.8% from 18 to 24, 25.9% from 25 to 44, 16.1% from 45 to 64, and 24.4% who were 65 years of age or older. The median age was 38 years. For every 100 females, there were 95.7 males. For every 100 females age 18 and over, there were 80.4 males.

The median income for a household in the city was $21,964, and the median income for a family was $27,125. Males had a median income of $26,944 versus $17,955 for females. The per capita income for the city was $11,598. About 24.0% of families and 26.4% of the population were below the poverty line, including 36.4% of those under age 18 and 31.1% of those age 65 or over.

== Education ==
Ralls County R-II School District operates two schools at Center: Center Elementary, Mark Twain Jr., sr. High School.

The town has a lending library, the Ralls County Library.
