= Ralls County, Missouri =

County in Missouri, United States

- County
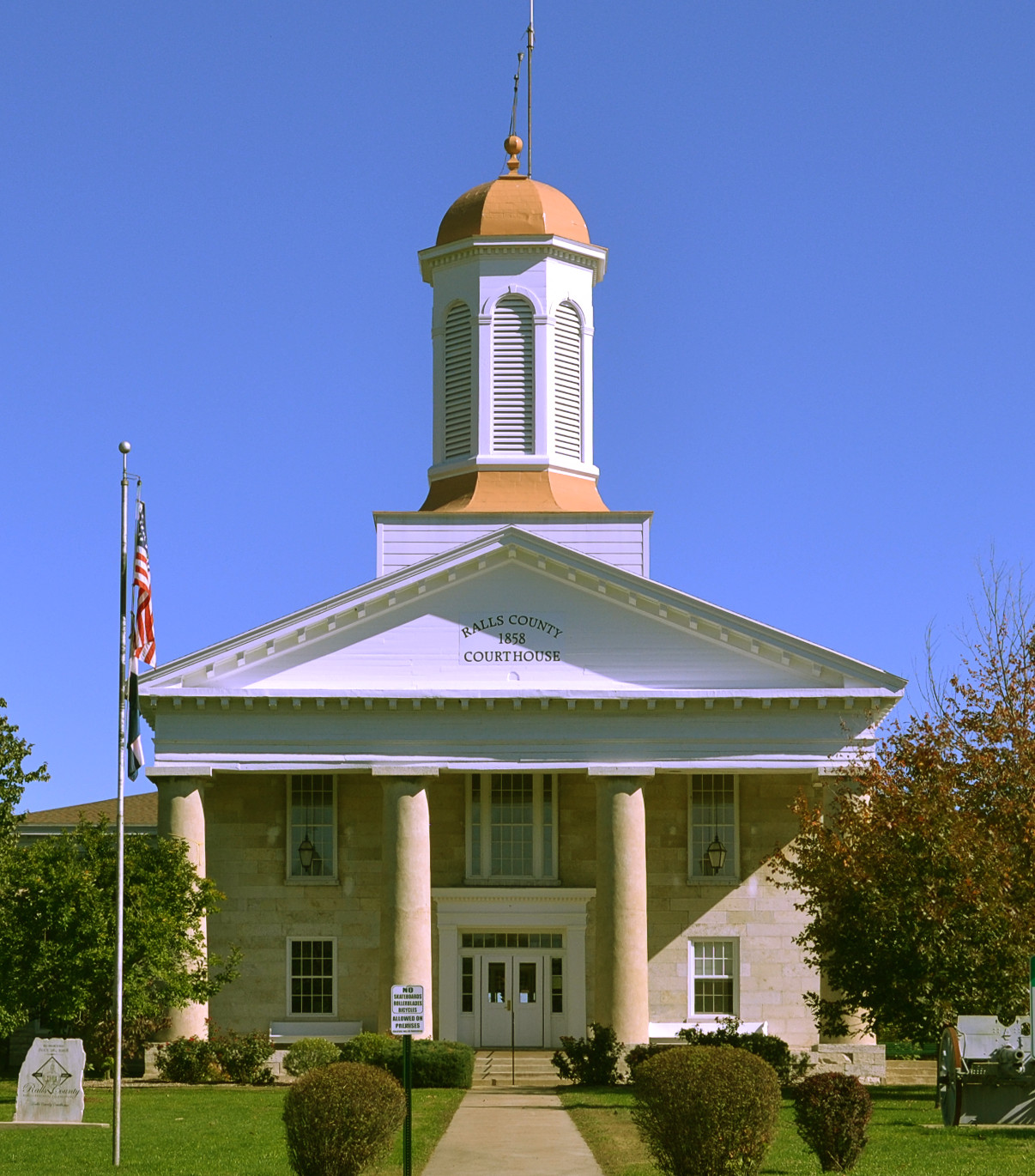
- Ralls County Courthouse in New London

- Location within the U.S. state of Missouri
- Coordinates: 39°32′N 91°32′W
- Country: United States
- State: Missouri
- Founded: November 16, 1820
- Named for: Daniel Ralls
- Seat: New London
- Largest city: Hannibal

Area
  - Total: 484 sq mi (1,250 km^{2})
  - Land: 470 sq mi (1,200 km^{2})
  - Water: 14 sq mi (36 km^{2}) 2.65%

Population (2020)
  - Total: 10,355
  - Estimate (2025): 10,444 ▲
  - Density: 22/sq mi (8.5/km^{2})
- Time zone: UTC−6 (Central)
  - Summer (DST): UTC−5 (CDT)
- Congressional district: 6th
- Website: rallscountymo.gov

Ralls County is a county located in the northeastern portion of the U.S. state of Missouri. As of the 2020 census, the population was 10,355. Its county seat is New London. The county was organized November 16, 1820, and named for Daniel Ralls, Missouri state legislator.

Ralls County is part of the Hannibal, MO Micropolitan Statistical Area, which is also included in the Quincy-Hannibal, IL-MO Combined Statistical Area.

== History ==
Ralls County was one of several along the Mississippi River settled in the early years primarily by European-American migrants from the Upper South, especially Kentucky and Tennessee. They brought slaves and slaveholding traditions with them, and quickly started cultivating crops similar to those in Middle Tennessee and Kentucky: hemp and tobacco. They also brought characteristic antebellum architecture and culture. Ralls is considered one of the counties in the outer ring of what is called the Little Dixie region. Most of the Little Dixie counties are located further west along the Missouri River, from Callaway County west.

== Geography ==
According to the U.S. Census Bureau, the county has a total area of 484 square miles (1,250 km^{2}), of which 470 square miles (1,200 km^{2}) is land and 14 square miles (36 km^{2}) (2.9%) is water.

=== Adjacent counties ===
- Marion County (north)
- Pike County, Illinois (northeast)
- Pike County (southeast)
- Audrain County (south)
- Monroe County (west)

=== Major highways ===
- Future I-72 / US 36 / Route 110 (CKC)
  - US 36 Bus. (Monroe City)
- US 24
- US 54
- US 61
  - US 61 Bus. (New London)
- Route 19
- Route 79
- Route 154

== Demographics ==
Historical population
| Census | Pop. | Note | %± |
|---|---|---|---|
| 1830 | 4,375 | | — |
| 1840 | 5,670 | | 29.6% |
| 1850 | 6,151 | | 8.5% |
| 1860 | 8,592 | | 39.7% |
| 1870 | 10,510 | | 22.3% |
| 1880 | 11,838 | | 12.6% |
| 1890 | 12,294 | | 3.9% |
| 1900 | 12,287 | | −0.1% |
| 1910 | 12,913 | | 5.1% |
| 1920 | 10,412 | | −19.4% |
| 1930 | 10,704 | | 2.8% |
| 1940 | 10,040 | | −6.2% |
| 1950 | 8,686 | | −13.5% |
| 1960 | 8,078 | | −7.0% |
| 1970 | 7,764 | | −3.9% |
| 1980 | 8,984 | | 15.7% |
| 1990 | 8,476 | | −5.7% |
| 2000 | 9,626 | | 13.6% |
| 2010 | 10,167 | | 5.6% |
| 2020 | 10,355 | | 1.8% |
| 2025 (est.) | 10,444 | ▲ | 0.9% |
U.S. Decennial Census; 1790-1960 1900-1990; 1990-2000 2010-2015

=== 2020 census ===
As of the 2020 census, the county had a population of 10,355. The median age was 45.5 years, with 21.9% of residents under the age of 18 and 21.6% aged 65 years or older. For every 100 females there were 102.7 males, and for every 100 females age 18 and over there were 102.2 males age 18 and over.

There were 4,125 households in the county, of which 29.2% had children under the age of 18 living with them and 17.2% had a female householder with no spouse or partner present. About 22.9% of all households were made up of individuals and 11.0% had someone living alone who was 65 years of age or older.

There were 5,028 housing units, of which 18.0% were vacant. Among occupied housing units, 83.3% were owner-occupied and 16.7% were renter-occupied. The homeowner vacancy rate was 1.1% and the rental vacancy rate was 5.4%.

2.5% of residents lived in urban areas, while 97.5% lived in rural areas.

=== Racial and ethnic composition ===
As of the 2020 census, the racial makeup of the county was 94.1% White, 1.1% Black or African American, 0.3% American Indian and Alaska Native, 0.2% Asian, 0.0% Native Hawaiian and Pacific Islander, 0.7% from some other race, and 3.6% from two or more races. Hispanic or Latino residents of any race comprised 0.9% of the population.

Ralls County, Missouri – Racial and ethnic composition Note: the US Census treats Hispanic/Latino as an ethnic category. This table excludes Latinos from the racial categories and assigns them to a separate category. Hispanics/Latinos may be of any race.
| Race / Ethnicity (NH = Non-Hispanic) | Pop 1980 | Pop 1990 | Pop 2000 | Pop 2010 | Pop 2020 | % 1980 | % 1990 | % 2000 | % 2010 | % 2020 |
|---|---|---|---|---|---|---|---|---|---|---|
| White alone (NH) | 8,706 | 8,300 | 9,393 | 9,828 | 9,713 | 97.70% | 97.92% | 97.58% | 96.67% | 93.80% |
| Black or African American alone (NH) | 164 | 138 | 106 | 107 | 114 | 1.84% | 1.63% | 1.10% | 1.05% | 1.10% |
| Native American or Alaska Native alone (NH) | 8 | 18 | 18 | 14 | 26 | 0.09% | 0.21% | 0.19% | 0.14% | 0.25% |
| Asian alone (NH) | 5 | 6 | 7 | 19 | 17 | 0.06% | 0.07% | 0.07% | 0.19% | 0.16% |
| Native Hawaiian or Pacific Islander alone (NH) | x | x | 1 | 12 | 4 | x | x | 0.01% | 0.12% | 0.04% |
| Other race alone (NH) | 2 | 0 | 2 | 5 | 41 | 0.02% | 0.00% | 0.02% | 0.05% | 0.40% |
| Mixed race or Multiracial (NH) | x | x | 57 | 84 | 344 | x | x | 0.59% | 0.83% | 3.32% |
| Hispanic or Latino (any race) | 26 | 14 | 42 | 98 | 96 | 0.29% | 0.17% | 0.44% | 0.96% | 0.93% |
| Total | 8,911 | 8,476 | 9,626 | 10,167 | 10,355 | 100.00% | 100.00% | 100.00% | 100.00% | 100.00% |

=== 2010 census ===
As of the 2010 census, there were 10,167 people, 3,736 households, and 2,783 families residing in the county. The population density was 20 people per square mile (7.7 people/km^{2}). There were 4,564 housing units at an average density of 10 units per square mile (3.9/km^{2}). The racial makeup of the county was 97.93% White, 1.11% Black or African American, 0.20% Native American, 0.08% Asian, 0.01% Pacific Islander, 0.04% from other races, and 0.62% from two or more races. Approximately 0.44% of the population were Hispanic or Latino of any race. 30.1% were of American, 27.3% German, 10.5% English and 10.4% Irish ancestry.

There were 3,736 households, out of which 34.00% had children under the age of 18 living with them, 64.20% were married couples living together, 6.50% had a female householder with no husband present, and 25.50% were non-families. 21.20% of all households were made up of individuals, and 10.00% had someone living alone who was 65 years of age or older. The average household size was 2.55 and the average family size was 2.95.

In the county, the population was spread out, with 25.20% under the age of 18, 7.10% from 18 to 24, 26.90% from 25 to 44, 26.50% from 45 to 64, and 14.20% who were 65 years of age or older. The median age was 39 years. For every 100 females, there were 100.90 males. For every 100 females age 18 and over, there were 98.90 males.

The median income for a household in the county was $37,094, and the median income for a family was $41,955. Males had a median income of $28,139 versus $20,238 for females. The per capita income for the county was $16,456. About 6.60% of families and 8.70% of the population were below the poverty line, including 9.70% of those under age 18 and 10.70% of those age 65 or over.

== Education ==
School districts in Ralls County (including those which may have schools and/or administration buildings in other counties)

- Ralls County R-II School District
- Bowling Green R-I School District
- Community R-VI School District
- Hannibal 60 School District
- Monroe City R-I School District
- Van-Far R-I School District

=== Public schools ===
- Ralls County R-II School District – Center
  - Ralls County Elementary School (PK-05)
  - Mark Twain Junior High School (06-08)
  - Mark Twain High School (09-12)

=== Public libraries ===
- Ralls County Library

== Communities ==
=== Cities ===
- Center
- Hannibal (mostly in Marion County)
- Monroe City (mostly in Monroe County and partly in Marion County)
- New London (county seat)
- Perry
- Vandalia (Mostly in Audrain County)

=== Village ===
- Rensselaer

=== Census-designated place ===
- Saverton

=== Unincorporated communities ===
- Cincinnati
- Flint Hill
- Greenlawn
- Hassard
- Hatch
- Huntington
- Hutchison
- Ilasco
- Madisonville
- Salt River
- Sheil
- Spalding
- West Hartford

== Politics ==
=== Local ===
Historically, the Democratic Party predominantly controlled politics at the local level in Ralls County. However, all local seats up for election with a Republican candidate during the November 2016 election cycle were won by Republicans. Republicans now hold the office of Sheriff, Coroner, and Western District Commissioner.

Ralls County, Missouri

Elected countywide officials
| Assessor | Josh Ketsenburg | Democratic |
| Circuit Clerk | Gina Jameson | Democratic |
| County Clerk | Brandy Flynn | Republican |
| Collector | Tara Comer | Democratic |
| Commissioner (presiding) | John Lake | Republican |
| Commissioner (district 1) | Junior Muehring | Republican |
| Commissioner (district 2) | Brian Hodges | Republican |
| Coroner | Robert VanWinkle | Republican |
| Prosecuting Attorney | Rodney J. Rodenbaugh | Democratic |
| Public Administrator | Paula Evans | Democratic |
| Recorder | Gina Jameson | Democratic |
| Sheriff | Brad Stinson | Republican |
| Surveyor | Marty Wasson | Democratic |
| Treasurer | Jena L. Epperson | Democratic |

=== State ===
Past Gubernatorial Elections Results
| Year | Republican | Democratic | Third Parties |
|---|---|---|---|
| 2024 | 79.85% 4,560 | 18.32% 1,046 | 1.84% 105 |
| 2020 | 77.24% 4,351 | 21.59% 1,216 | 1.17% 66 |
| 2016 | 64.47% 3,371 | 33.72% 1,763 | 1.81% 95 |
| 2012 | 52.97% 2,595 | 45.72% 2,279 | 2.21% 110 |
| 2008 | 53.74% 2,717 | 44.76% 2,263 | 1.50% 76 |
| 2004 | 61.68% 3,090 | 37.25% 1,866 | 1.08% 54 |
| 2000 | 47.21% 2,145 | 51.65% 2,347 | 1.14% 52 |
| 1996 | 27.05% 1,097 | 71.06% 2,882 | 1.90% 77 |

Ralls County is a part of Missouri's 40h District in the Missouri House of Representatives and is represented by Jim Hansen (R-Frankford).

Missouri House of Representatives — District 40 — Ralls County (2016)
| Party | Candidate | Votes | % | ±% |
|---|---|---|---|---|
| Republican | Jim Hansen | 4,492 | 100.00% | +30.20 |

Missouri House of Representatives — District 40 — Ralls County (2014)
| Party | Candidate | Votes | % | ±% |
|---|---|---|---|---|
| Republican | Jim Hansen | 2,223 | 69.80% | +16.40 |
| Democratic | Lowell Jackson | 962 | 30.20% | −16.40 |

Missouri House of Representatives — District 40 — Ralls County (2012)
| Party | Candidate | Votes | % | ±% |
|---|---|---|---|---|
| Republican | Jim Hansen | 2,642 | 53.40% | |
| Democratic | Paul Quinn | 2,306 | 46.60% | |

Ralls County is a part of Missouri's 18th District in the Missouri Senate and is currently represented by Brian Munzlinger (R-Williamstown).

Missouri Senate — District 18 — Ralls County (2014)
| Party | Candidate | Votes | % | ±% |
|---|---|---|---|---|
| Republican | Brian Munzlinger | 2,498 | 100.00% | |

=== Federal ===
U.S. Senate — Missouri — Ralls County (2016)
| Party | Candidate | Votes | % | ±% |
|---|---|---|---|---|
| Republican | Roy Blunt | 3,220 | 61.91% | +10.15 |
| Democratic | Jason Kander | 1,763 | 33.90% | −10.93 |
| Libertarian | Jonathan Dine | 115 | 2.21% | −1.20 |
| Green | Johnathan McFarland | 47 | 0.90% | +0.90 |
| Constitution | Fred Ryman | 56 | 1.08% | +1.08 |

U.S. Senate — Missouri — Ralls County (2012)
| Party | Candidate | Votes | % | ±% |
|---|---|---|---|---|
| Republican | Todd Akin | 2,596 | 51.76% | |
| Democratic | Claire McCaskill | 2,248 | 44.83% | |
| Libertarian | Jonathan Dine | 171 | 3.41% | |

Ralls County is included in Missouri's 6th Congressional District and is currently represented by Sam Graves (R-Tarkio) in the U.S. House of Representatives.

U.S. House of Representatives — Missouri's 6th Congressional District — Ralls County (2016)
| Party | Candidate | Votes | % | ±% |
|---|---|---|---|---|
| Republican | Sam Graves | 3,745 | 73.52% | +4.22 |
| Democratic | David M. Blackwell | 1,239 | 24.32% | −4.25 |
| Libertarian | Russ Lee Monchil | 76 | 1.49% | −0.64 |
| Green | Mike Diel | 34 | 0.67% | +0.67 |

U.S. House of Representatives — Missouri’s 6th Congressional District — Ralls County (2014)
| Party | Candidate | Votes | % | ±% |
|---|---|---|---|---|
| Republican | Sam Graves | 2,144 | 69.30% | +8.39 |
| Democratic | Bill Hedge | 884 | 28.57% | −8.72 |
| Libertarian | Russ Lee Monchil | 66 | 2.13% | +0.33 |

U.S. House of Representatives — Missouri's 6th Congressional District — Ralls County (2012)
| Party | Candidate | Votes | % | ±% |
|---|---|---|---|---|
| Republican | Sam Graves | 2,917 | 60.91% | |
| Democratic | Kyle Yarber | 1,786 | 37.29% | |
| Libertarian | Russ Lee Monchil | 86 | 1.80% | |

United States presidential election results for Ralls County, Missouri
| Year | Republican | | Democratic | | Third party(ies) | |
| Year | No. | % | No. | % | No. | % |
|---|---|---|---|---|---|---|
| 1888 | 816 | 29.42% | 1,942 | 70.01% | 16 | 0.58% |
| 1892 | 802 | 28.65% | 1,968 | 70.31% | 29 | 1.04% |
| 1896 | 814 | 26.08% | 2,297 | 73.60% | 10 | 0.32% |
| 1900 | 770 | 26.02% | 2,161 | 73.03% | 28 | 0.95% |
| 1904 | 792 | 30.32% | 1,794 | 68.68% | 26 | 1.00% |
| 1908 | 900 | 31.35% | 1,947 | 67.82% | 24 | 0.84% |
| 1912 | 591 | 22.88% | 1,734 | 67.13% | 258 | 9.99% |
| 1916 | 826 | 29.04% | 1,994 | 70.11% | 24 | 0.84% |
| 1920 | 1,362 | 32.45% | 2,803 | 66.79% | 32 | 0.76% |
| 1924 | 1,365 | 33.52% | 2,617 | 64.27% | 90 | 2.21% |
| 1928 | 1,794 | 44.07% | 2,273 | 55.83% | 4 | 0.10% |
| 1932 | 761 | 17.67% | 3,526 | 81.87% | 20 | 0.46% |
| 1936 | 1,051 | 21.51% | 3,822 | 78.24% | 12 | 0.25% |
| 1940 | 1,412 | 28.35% | 3,562 | 71.53% | 6 | 0.12% |
| 1944 | 1,164 | 29.35% | 2,799 | 70.57% | 3 | 0.08% |
| 1948 | 908 | 23.15% | 3,013 | 76.82% | 1 | 0.03% |
| 1952 | 1,437 | 32.18% | 3,020 | 67.64% | 8 | 0.18% |
| 1956 | 1,373 | 34.28% | 2,632 | 65.72% | 0 | 0.00% |
| 1960 | 1,485 | 37.31% | 2,495 | 62.69% | 0 | 0.00% |
| 1964 | 736 | 20.54% | 2,847 | 79.46% | 0 | 0.00% |
| 1968 | 1,175 | 33.07% | 1,900 | 53.48% | 478 | 13.45% |
| 1972 | 1,827 | 57.13% | 1,371 | 42.87% | 0 | 0.00% |
| 1976 | 1,334 | 36.23% | 2,318 | 62.95% | 30 | 0.81% |
| 1980 | 1,968 | 47.51% | 2,069 | 49.95% | 105 | 2.54% |
| 1984 | 2,067 | 50.69% | 2,011 | 49.31% | 0 | 0.00% |
| 1988 | 1,494 | 37.44% | 2,489 | 62.38% | 7 | 0.18% |
| 1992 | 1,349 | 30.71% | 2,158 | 49.12% | 886 | 20.17% |
| 1996 | 1,513 | 37.34% | 1,998 | 49.31% | 541 | 13.35% |
| 2000 | 2,446 | 53.85% | 2,033 | 44.76% | 63 | 1.39% |
| 2004 | 2,986 | 59.32% | 2,031 | 40.35% | 17 | 0.34% |
| 2008 | 2,987 | 58.75% | 2,041 | 40.15% | 56 | 1.10% |
| 2012 | 3,231 | 64.16% | 1,736 | 34.47% | 69 | 1.37% |
| 2016 | 3,969 | 74.97% | 1,138 | 21.50% | 187 | 3.53% |
| 2020 | 4,396 | 77.64% | 1,205 | 21.28% | 61 | 1.08% |
| 2024 | 4,575 | 79.19% | 1,154 | 19.98% | 48 | 0.83% |

== See also ==
- National Register of Historic Places listings in Ralls County, Missouri
