= Jefferson Township, Missouri =

Jefferson Township is the name of 18 townships in the U.S. state of Missouri:

- Jefferson Township, Andrew County, Missouri
- Jefferson Township, Cedar County, Missouri
- Jefferson Township, Clark County, Missouri
- Jefferson Township, Cole County, Missouri
- Jefferson Township, Daviess County, Missouri
- Jefferson Township, Grundy County, Missouri
- Jefferson Township, Harrison County, Missouri
- Jefferson Township, Johnson County, Missouri
- Jefferson Township, Linn County, Missouri
- Jefferson Township, Maries County, Missouri
- Jefferson Township, Monroe County, Missouri
- Jefferson Township, Nodaway County, Missouri
- Jefferson Township, Osage County, Missouri
- Jefferson Township, Polk County, Missouri
- Jefferson Township, Scotland County, Missouri
- Jefferson Township, Shelby County, Missouri
- Jefferson Township, St. Louis County, Missouri
- Jefferson Township, Wayne County, Missouri

== See also ==
- Jefferson Township (disambiguation)
