= National Register of Historic Places listings in Monroe County, Missouri =

Location of Monroe County in Missouri

This is a list of the National Register of Historic Places listings in Monroe County, Missouri.

This is intended to be a complete list of the properties and districts on the National Register of Historic Places in Monroe County, Missouri, United States. Latitude and longitude coordinates are provided for many National Register properties and districts; these locations may be seen together in a map.

There are 10 properties and districts listed on the National Register in the county.

This National Park Service list is complete through NPS recent listings posted February 27, 2026.

== Current listings ==
	Name on the Register	Image	Date listed	Location	City or town	Description
1	Crigler Mound Group Archeological Site		May 21, 1969 (#69000115)	Crigler Cemetery, north of Florida; 39°30′45″N 91°45′02″W	Florida	
2	Farmers and Merchants Bank Building	Farmers and Merchants Bank Building	January 12, 2012 (#11001020)	201-207 S. Main St. 39°39′08″N 91°44′05″W	Monroe City	
3	Holliday Petroglyphs		January 11, 1974 (#74001083)	Northern half of the southeastern quarter of Section 34, Township 55 North, Range 11 West, northeast of Holliday; 39°30′23″N 92°07′05″W	Holliday	
4	Mark Twain State Park Picnic Shelter at Buzzard's Roost	Mark Twain State Park Picnic Shelter at Buzzard's Roost	March 4, 1985 (#85000515)	Off Route 107; 39°28′23″N 91°47′37″W	Santa Fe	
5	Paris Male Academy	Paris Male Academy	July 19, 1990 (#90001103)	411 E. Monroe St. 39°28′56″N 91°59′40″W	Paris	
6	St. Jude's Episcopal Church	St. Jude's Episcopal Church	November 22, 2000 (#00001397)	301 N. Main St. 39°39′16″N 91°44′05″W	Monroe City	
7	Mark Twain Birthplace Cabin	Mark Twain Birthplace Cabin	May 21, 1969 (#69000116)	Mark Twain State Park, 2.5 miles (4.0 km) south of Florida on Route 107; 39°30′48″N 91°45′06″W	Florida	
8	Union Covered Bridge	Union Covered Bridge	June 15, 1970 (#70000342)	6 miles (9.7 km) west of Paris on Elk Fork of the Salt River; 39°25′58″N 92°06′08″W	Paris	
9	Merritt Violette House	Merritt Violette House	September 8, 1983 (#83001031)	Off Route 107; 39°29′37″N 91°47′06″W	Florida	
10	Washington School	Washington School	December 29, 1994 (#94001502)	529 S. Locust St. 39°38′17″N 91°44′12″W	Monroe City	

== See also ==
- List of National Historic Landmarks in Missouri
- National Register of Historic Places listings in Missouri
