= Jefferson Township =

Jefferson Township may refer to:

== Arkansas ==
- Jefferson Township, Boone County, Arkansas
- Jefferson Township, Desha County, Arkansas, in Desha County, Arkansas
- Jefferson Township, Independence County, Arkansas, in Independence County, Arkansas
- Jefferson Township, Izard County, Arkansas, in Izard County, Arkansas
- Jefferson Township, Jackson County, Arkansas, in Jackson County, Arkansas
- Jefferson Township, Jefferson County, Arkansas, in Jefferson County, Arkansas
- Jefferson Township, Little River County, Arkansas, in Little River County, Arkansas
- Jefferson Township, Newton County, Arkansas, in Newton County, Arkansas
- Jefferson Township, Ouachita County, Arkansas, in Ouachita County, Arkansas
- Jefferson Township, Saline County, Arkansas, in Saline County, Arkansas
- Jefferson Township, Sevier County, Arkansas, in Sevier County, Arkansas
- Jefferson Township, White County, Arkansas, in White County, Arkansas

== Illinois ==
- Jefferson Township, Cook County, Illinois
- Jefferson Township, Stephenson County, Illinois

== Indiana ==
- Jefferson Township, Adams County, Indiana
- Jefferson Township, Allen County, Indiana
- Jefferson Township, Boone County, Indiana
- Jefferson Township, Carroll County, Indiana
- Jefferson Township, Cass County, Indiana
- Jefferson Township, Dubois County, Indiana
- Jefferson Township, Elkhart County, Indiana
- Jefferson Township, Grant County, Indiana
- Jefferson Township, Greene County, Indiana
- Jefferson Township, Henry County, Indiana
- Jefferson Township, Huntington County, Indiana
- Jefferson Township, Jay County, Indiana
- Jefferson Township, Kosciusko County, Indiana
- Jefferson Township, Miami County, Indiana
- Jefferson Township, Morgan County, Indiana
- Jefferson Township, Newton County, Indiana
- Jefferson Township, Noble County, Indiana
- Jefferson Township, Owen County, Indiana
- Jefferson Township, Pike County, Indiana
- Jefferson Township, Pulaski County, Indiana
- Jefferson Township, Putnam County, Indiana
- Jefferson Township, Sullivan County, Indiana
- Jefferson Township, Switzerland County, Indiana
- Jefferson Township, Tipton County, Indiana
- Jefferson Township, Washington County, Indiana
- Jefferson Township, Wayne County, Indiana
- Jefferson Township, Wells County, Indiana
- Jefferson Township, Whitley County, Indiana

== Iowa ==
- Jefferson Township, Adair County, Iowa
- Jefferson Township, Allamakee County, Iowa
- Jefferson Township, Bremer County, Iowa
- Jefferson Township, Buchanan County, Iowa
- Jefferson Township, Butler County, Iowa
- Jefferson Township, Clayton County, Iowa
- Jefferson Township, Dubuque County, Iowa, in Dubuque County, Iowa
- Jefferson Township, Fayette County, Iowa
- Jefferson Township, Harrison County, Iowa
- Jefferson Township, Henry County, Iowa
- Jefferson Township, Johnson County, Iowa
- Jefferson Township, Lee County, Iowa
- Jefferson Township, Louisa County, Iowa
- Jefferson Township, Madison County, Iowa
- Jefferson Township, Mahaska County, Iowa
- Jefferson Township, Marshall County, Iowa
- Jefferson Township, Polk County, Iowa
- Jefferson Township, Poweshiek County, Iowa
- Jefferson Township, Ringgold County, Iowa
- Jefferson Township, Shelby County, Iowa, in Shelby County, Iowa
- Jefferson Township, Taylor County, Iowa
- Jefferson Township, Warren County, Iowa, in Warren County, Iowa
- Jefferson Township, Wayne County, Iowa

== Kansas ==
- Jefferson Township, Chautauqua County, Kansas
- Jefferson Township, Dickinson County, Kansas
- Jefferson Township, Geary County, Kansas
- Jefferson Township, Jackson County, Kansas
- Jefferson Township, Jefferson County, Kansas
- Jefferson Township, Rawlins County, Kansas, in Rawlins County, Kansas
- Jefferson Township, Republic County, Kansas

== Michigan ==
- Jefferson Township, Cass County, Michigan
- Jefferson Township, Hillsdale County, Michigan

== Minnesota ==
- Jefferson Township, Houston County, Minnesota

== Missouri ==
- Jefferson Township, Andrew County, Missouri
- Jefferson Township, Cedar County, Missouri
- Jefferson Township, Clark County, Missouri
- Jefferson Township, Cole County, Missouri
- Jefferson Township, Daviess County, Missouri
- Jefferson Township, Grundy County, Missouri
- Jefferson Township, Harrison County, Missouri
- Jefferson Township, Johnson County, Missouri
- Jefferson Township, Linn County, Missouri
- Jefferson Township, Maries County, Missouri
- Jefferson Township, Monroe County, Missouri
- Jefferson Township, Nodaway County, Missouri
- Jefferson Township, Osage County, Missouri
- Jefferson Township, Polk County, Missouri
- Jefferson Township, Scotland County, Missouri
- Jefferson Township, Shelby County, Missouri
- Jefferson Township, St. Louis County, Missouri, in St. Louis County, Missouri
- Jefferson Township, Wayne County, Missouri

== Nebraska ==
- Jefferson Township, Knox County, Nebraska

== New Jersey ==
- Jefferson Township, New Jersey

== North Carolina ==
- Jefferson Township, Ashe County, North Carolina
- Jefferson Township, Guilford County, North Carolina, in Guilford County, North Carolina

== North Dakota ==
- Jefferson Township, Pierce County, North Dakota, in Pierce County, North Dakota

== Ohio ==
- Jefferson Township, Adams County, Ohio
- Jefferson Township, Ashtabula County, Ohio
- Jefferson Township, Brown County, Ohio
- Jefferson Township, Clinton County, Ohio
- Jefferson Township, Coshocton County, Ohio
- Jefferson Township, Crawford County, Ohio
- Jefferson Township, Fayette County, Ohio
- Jefferson Township, Franklin County, Ohio
- Jefferson Township, Greene County, Ohio
- Jefferson Township, Guernsey County, Ohio
- Jefferson Township, Jackson County, Ohio
- Jefferson Township, Knox County, Ohio
- Jefferson Township, Logan County, Ohio
- Jefferson Township, Madison County, Ohio
- Jefferson Township, Mercer County, Ohio
- Jefferson Township, Montgomery County, Ohio
- Jefferson Township, Muskingum County, Ohio
- Jefferson Township, Noble County, Ohio
- Jefferson Township, Preble County, Ohio
- Jefferson Township, Richland County, Ohio
- Jefferson Township, Ross County, Ohio
- Jefferson Township, Scioto County, Ohio
- Jefferson Township, Tuscarawas County, Ohio
- Jefferson Township, Williams County, Ohio

== Pennsylvania ==
- Jefferson Township, Berks County, Pennsylvania
- Jefferson Township, Butler County, Pennsylvania
- Jefferson Township, Dauphin County, Pennsylvania
- Jefferson Township, Fayette County, Pennsylvania
- Jefferson Township, Greene County, Pennsylvania
- Jefferson Township, Lackawanna County, Pennsylvania
- Jefferson Township, Mercer County, Pennsylvania
- Jefferson Township, Somerset County, Pennsylvania
- Jefferson Township, Washington County, Pennsylvania

== South Dakota ==
- Jefferson Township, McCook County, South Dakota, in McCook County, South Dakota
- Jefferson Township, Moody County, South Dakota, in Moody County, South Dakota
- Jefferson Township, Spink County, South Dakota, in Spink County, South Dakota
- Jefferson Township, Union County, South Dakota, in Union County, South Dakota
