= Missouri Route 154 =

State highway in Missouri, U.S.

Route 154
- MO 154 highlighted in red

Route information
- Maintained by MoDOT
- Length: 40.138 mi (64.596 km)

Major junctions
- West end: US 24 west of Paris
- East end: US 54 north of Vandalia

Location
- Country: United States
- State: Missouri

Highway system
- Missouri State Highway System; Interstate; US; State; Supplemental
← Route 153	→ I-155

Route 154 is a highway in northeastern Missouri. Its eastern terminus is at U.S. Route 54 north of Vandalia; its western terminus is at U.S. Route 24) west of Paris, where Business US 24 also has its western terminus. Route 154 passes through Mark Twain State Park and over Mark Twain Lake.

Route 154 between Paris and Perry was part of Route 54, which continued east to New London, until 1926 or 1927, when it was renumbered Route 26 because of US 54. The part east of Perry became an extension of Route 19 in about 1930, and the rest was renumbered Route 154 by 1946.

== Major intersections ==
County	Location	mi	km	Destinations	Notes
Monroe	Jackson Township	0.000	0.000	US 24 – Madison, Monroe City US 24 Bus. begins	Western end of US 24 Business overlap
Monroe	Paris	1.747– 1.873	2.812– 3.014	US 24 Bus. east / Route 15 north – Paris	Eastern end of US 24 Business overlap; western end of Route 15 overlap
Monroe	Jackson Township	2.080	3.347	Route 15 south – Mexico	Eastern end of Route 15 overlap
Monroe	Jefferson Township	13.699	22.046	Route 107 north / Route E – Florida	
Ralls	Salt River Township	22.453	36.135	Route 19 north – Center	Western end of Route 19 overlap
Ralls	Salt River Township	27.787	44.719	Route 19 south	Eastern end of Route 19 overlap
Pike	Spencer Township	40.138	64.596	US 54 – Curryville, Vandalia	
1.000 mi = 1.609 km; 1.000 km = 0.621 mi: Concurrency terminus
