= Florida, Missouri =

Village in Monroe County, Missouri, United States

- Village
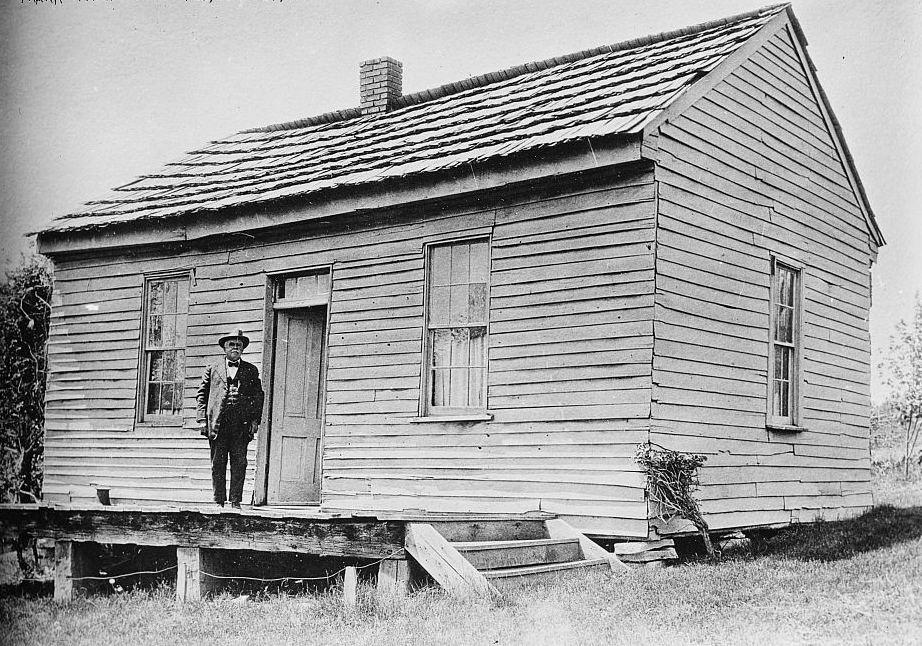
- Birthplace of Mark Twain in Florida

- Location in Monroe County and the state of Missouri
- Coordinates: 39°29′35″N 91°47′26″W
- Country: United States
- State: Missouri
- County: Monroe
- Named for: U.S. state of Florida

Area
  - Total: 0.10 sq mi (0.27 km^{2})
  - Land: 0.10 sq mi (0.27 km^{2})
  - Water: 0 sq mi (0.00 km^{2})
- Elevation: 646 ft (197 m)

Population (2020)
  - Total: 5
  - Density: 47.6/sq mi (18.38/km^{2})
- Time zone: UTC-6 (Central (CST))
  - Summer (DST): UTC-5 (CDT)
- ZIP code: 65283
- Area code: 573
- FIPS code: 29-24760
- GNIS feature ID: 2398888

Florida is a village in Monroe County, Missouri, United States. It is located at the intersection of Missouri Route 107 and State Route U on the shores of Mark Twain Lake. In 1910 the population was 200, per the census data in the 1911 Cram's World Atlas. As of the 2020 census, Florida had a population of 5. The Mark Twain Birthplace State Historic Site is located in Florida, with Mark Twain State Park nearby.

== History ==
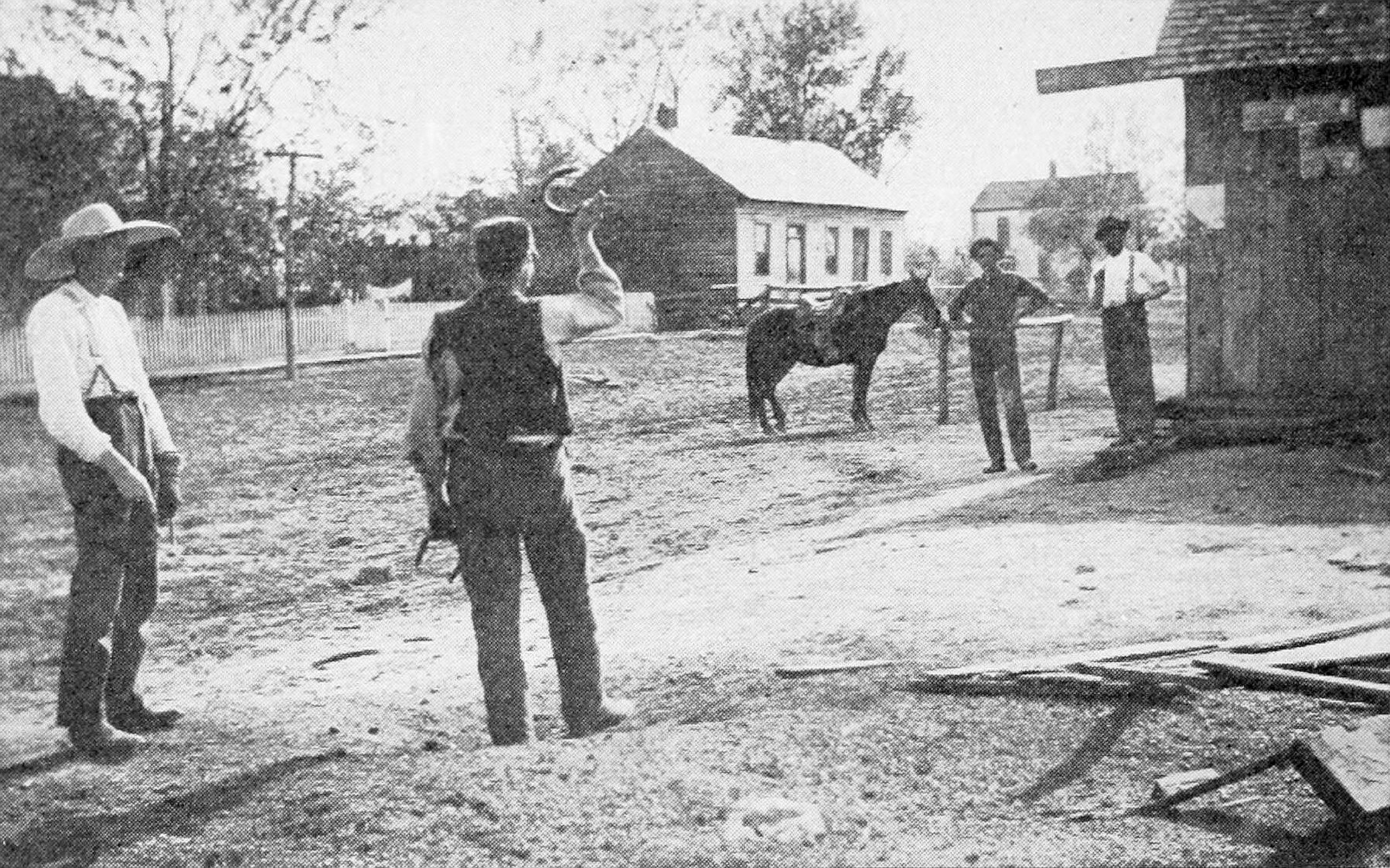
Playing horseshoes in Florida, 1919

The village was laid out in the winter of 1831. The community took its name from the state of Florida. The founders were Robert Donaldson, Joseph Grigsby, Hugh A. Hickman, a Doctor Keenan, John Witt, and Major W.N. Penn. Hickman owned and operated a mill approximately one half-mile (800 m) south of Florida, while Penn had a dry goods store near there as well. Penn soon moved his store into Florida proper, becoming the town's first business.

Mark Twain was born in Florida in 1835. He said his birthplace was "a nearly invisible village", and "The village contained a hundred people and I increased the population by 1 per cent. It is more than many of the best men in history could have done for a town."

In the early years there was some hope of the town becoming a regional point of commerce and shipping. Florida is located at the confluence of the North, South, and Middle forks of the Salt River, 48 miles (77 km) upstream from its mouth emptying into the Mississippi River at Louisiana, Missouri. The location was thought to be strategic because it was felt to be a potential "growth center" in the settlement of northeast Missouri. For example, John Clemens, father of Mark Twain, along with other investors, had formed the Salt River Navigation Company in 1836 in hopes of developing this water commerce. Several boatloads of flour were shipped from Hickman's mill to the Mississippi and returned with sugar, coffee, and manufactured goods. However, fickle river levels on the Salt made consistent shipping via barge or riverboat impractical. Having no railroad and with river shipping no longer an option, Florida was destined to remain a small village attending to the commerce needs of area farmers.

The Clemens family, seeking better opportunities, left Florida for Hannibal, Missouri, when young Samuel was around five years old. He would continue to visit Florida for extended summer vacations at his uncle John Quarles' farm. Such summer memories and social interactions with Quarles house servants formed many of the sketches and perspectives that Clemens placed in his novels. The Quarles farmhouse remains as an active archeological project available to the public near Florida.

=== Civil War ===
As part of the area known as Little Dixie, Monroe County's residents largely sided with the Confederacy during the Civil War. The area around Florida was the scene of two small battles during the conflict. The first happened in July 1861. Brigadier General Thomas A. Harris of the pro-Confederate Missouri State Guard had established his headquarters at Florida in June, and by early July he had nearly 500 troops in the immediate vicinity under his command. When informed of this growing threat by Union sympathizers and Federal spies, Union commander Nathaniel Lyon in St. Louis ordered action be taken. On July 8, 1861, Federal forces consisting of six companies of regular infantry plus a company of Hannibal Home Guards — around six hundred men total — and a cannon with crew, set out from Palmyra, Missouri, toward Florida.

Learning of their approach, General Harris sent a unit of approximately 50 men to reconnoiter and harass the Federals. The opposing forces clashed at a place called Hagar's Hill, 4 miles (6 km) north of Florida. Hidden by thick timber and brush, the State Guardsmen ambushed the Federals, opening fire at very close range. The Federal troops quickly regrouped and returned heavy fire with their superior numbers, causing the State Guard force to flee. Casualties were surprisingly light, with one State Guardsman killed and a few others slightly wounded. The Federals had none killed but three seriously wounded. Meanwhile, the bulk of State Guard and various Confederate bushwhackers had outflanked the Federals and attacked Monroe City, Missouri, and its vital railroad line. This forced the Federals to turn back from the march on Florida.

The second Civil War action to happen near Florida occurred about one year later. On July 22, 1862, a Confederate force (numbers vary between 300 and 400 men) under Colonel Joseph C. Porter were traveling south through Monroe County after a raid on Memphis, Missouri, and the Battle of Vassar Hill in Scotland County. At Florida, they were surprised by a detachment of Federal cavalry, approximately fifty men, under Major Henry Clay Caldwell. Despite being vastly outnumbered, the Federals engaged Porter's force, and a battle ensued for approximately an hour. After suffering six killed, twenty-two wounded, and two captured, Caldwell and his cavalry retreated to Paris, Missouri. Porter, having only one killed and three wounded, also left the area, continuing on toward Callaway County, clashing with Federal forces again on July 24, near Santa Fe, and at the Battle of Moore's Mill on July 28.

=== Postbellum ===
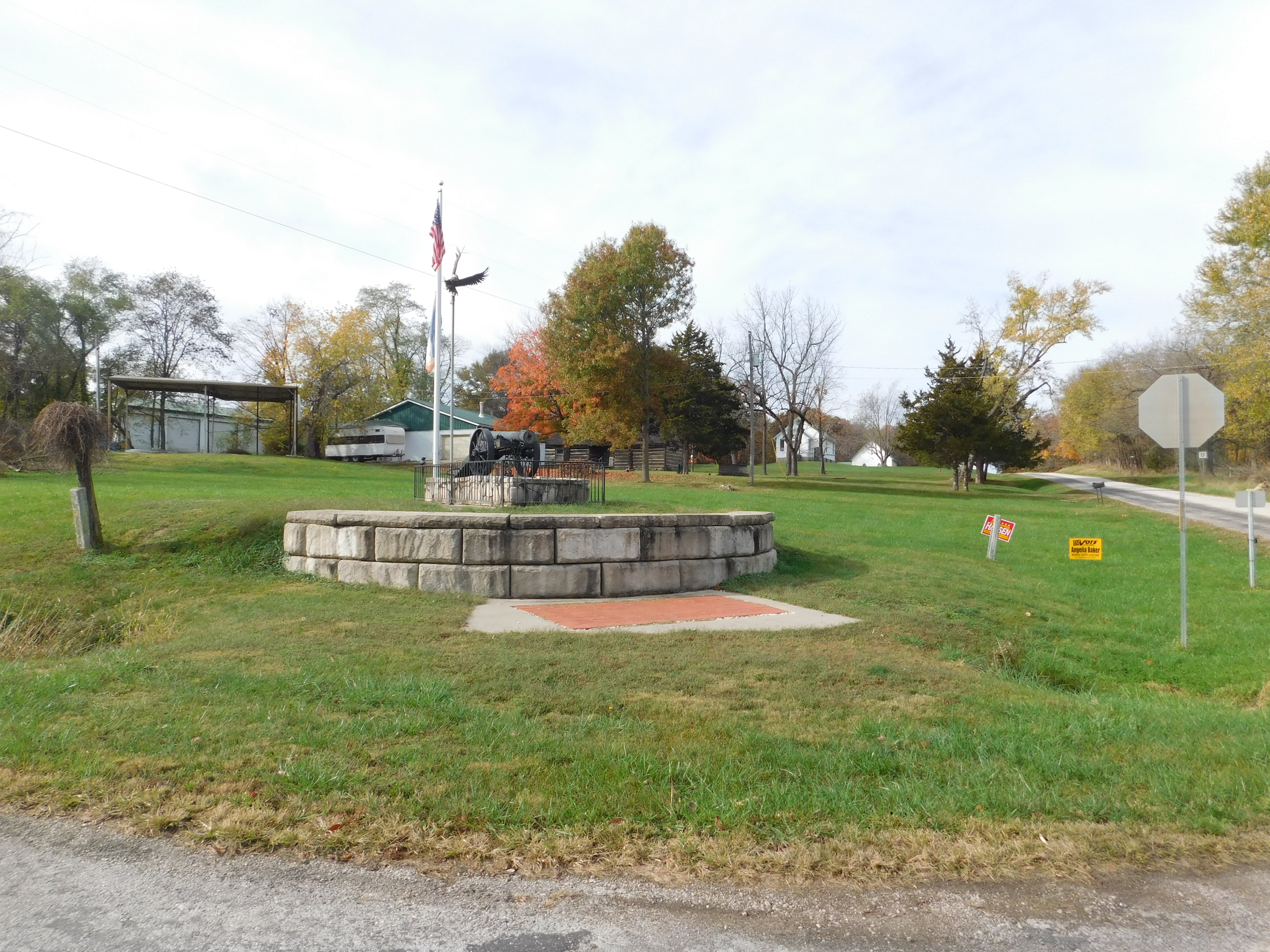
Florida in 2016

Florida continued a pattern of slow growth after the Civil War, reaching its peak population of 280 residents in 1880. The 20th century was not nearly so kind to the community, however, especially after World War II, as businesses closed and families moved away to find better opportunities in cities. The construction of Mark Twain Lake in the mid-1960s permanently flooded some of the valuable farmland around Florida, although it opened more opportunities for recreation and tourism. In 1960, the state of Missouri created the Mark Twain Birthplace State Historic Site. Twain's birthplace was moved into a climate-controlled museum setting, which also contains exhibits and displays such as rare first edition books, a hand-written manuscript of The Adventures of Tom Sawyer, and furnishings from his home. A red granite monument elsewhere in Florida marks the original site of Twain's birth home.

In addition to the Mark Twain Birthplace State Historic Site, the Crigler Mound Group Archeological Site and Merritt Violette House are listed on the National Register of Historic Places.

== Geography ==
Florida is located in eastern Monroe County, overlooking Mark Twain Lake, a reservoir on the Salt River. The North and Middle forks of the Salt River join within the lake, just east of the bluff on which Florida stands. The Mark Twain Birthplace State Historic Site lies along what is now the eastern edge of the village, while Mark Twain State Park, a public recreation area associated with Mark Twain Lake, borders the village to the south and west. Missouri Route 107 runs along the western boundary of the village, leading north 6 miles (10 km) to U.S. Route 24 and south less than 3 miles (5 km) to Missouri Route 154. Paris, the Monroe county seat, is 14 miles (23 km) to the west via State Highway U and US 24.

According to the U.S. Census Bureau, the village has a total area of 0.1 square miles (0.26 km^{2}), all land.

== Demographics ==
Historical population
Census	Pop.	Note	%±
1990	2		—
2000	9		350.0%
2010	0		−100.0%
2020	5		—
U.S. Decennial Census

As of the census of 2000, there were 9 people, 4 households, and 2 families residing in the village. The population density was 86.4 inhabitants per square mile (33.4/km^{2}). There were 21 housing units at an average density of 201.7 per square mile (77.9/km^{2}). All residents were White.

There were 4 households, out of which one had children under the age of 18 living with them, one was a married couple living together, one had a female householder with no husband present, and two were non-families. One household was made up of an individual who was 65 years of age or older. The average household size was 2.25 and the average family size was 3.

In the village, the population was spread out, with two under the age of 18 (both females), two from 18 to 25, two from 25 to 45, one from 45 to 65, and two who were 65 years of age or older. The median age was 30 years. There were six females (including the two under 18) and three males.

== See also ==
- List of cities in Missouri
