= Pooles Branch =

Stream in the U.S. state of Missouri

Pooles Branch (also spelled Pools Branch) is a stream in Monroe County in the U.S. state of Missouri. It is a tributary of Elk Fork Salt River.

The stream headwaters arise adjacent to US Route 24 approximately five miles west of Paris at 39°28′36″N 92°05′59″W. It passes under Route 24 south of the old Fowkes railroad station and meanders for around three miles to its confluence with the Elk Fork about 2.5 miles south of Paris at 39°26′31″N 92°01′07″W.

Pooles Branch has the name of Felix Pool, original owner of the site.

== See also ==
- List of rivers of Missouri
