= Missouri Route 107 =

State highway in Missouri, U.S.

Route 107
- MO 107 highlighted in red

Route information
- Maintained by MoDOT
- Length: 8.792 mi (14.149 km)

Major junctions
- South end: Route 154 / Route E in Mark Twain State Park
- North end: US 24 southwest of Monroe City

Location
- Country: United States
- State: Missouri

Highway system
- Missouri State Highway System; Interstate; US; State; Supplemental
| ← Route 106 | → Route 108 |

Route 107 is a highway in northeastern Missouri. Its northern terminus is at U.S. Route 24 southwest of Monroe City; its southern terminus is at Route 154 about nine miles (14 km) south of the northern terminus in Mark Twain State Park. No towns are on the route, but the Mark Twain Birthplace State Historic Site is less than a mile to the east in Florida. The highway crosses Mark Twain Lake twice.

== Route description ==
Route 107 begins at an intersection with Route 154 south of Mark Twain State Park in Monroe County, where the roadway continues south as Route E. From the southern terminus, the route heads north as a two-lane undivided road, passing through wooded areas of Mark Twain State Park. The road crosses a part of Mark Twain Lake before leaving the state park and reaching an intersection with the eastern terminus of Route U. Route 107 continues northwest and crosses another portion of Mark Twain Lake prior to curving north again and passing through more woodland. The road heads to the northwest and runs through a mix of farm fields and wooded areas. Route 107 curves north and continues through agricultural areas before ending at US 24 southwest of Monroe City.

== Major intersections ==
The entire route is in Monroe County.

| Location | mi | km | Destinations | Notes |
|---|---|---|---|---|
| Mark Twain State Park | 0.000 | 0.000 | Route 154 / Route E south | |
| Mark Twain State Park | 2.658 | 4.278 | Route U west | |
| Monroe City | 8.792 | 14.149 | US 24 | |
1.000 mi = 1.609 km; 1.000 km = 0.621 mi
