= Jefferson Township, Michigan =

Jefferson Township is the name of some places in the U.S. state of Michigan:

- Jefferson Township, Cass County, Michigan
- Jefferson Township, Hillsdale County, Michigan

== See also ==
- Jefferson Township (disambiguation)
