= Jefferson Township, South Dakota =

Jefferson Township is the name of 4 townships in the U.S. state of South Dakota:

- Jefferson Township, McCook County, South Dakota
- Jefferson Township, Moody County, South Dakota
- Jefferson Township, Spink County, South Dakota
- Jefferson Township, Union County, South Dakota

== See also ==
- Jefferson Township (disambiguation)
