= Merritt Violette House =

Historic house in Missouri, United States

- U.S. National Register of Historic Places
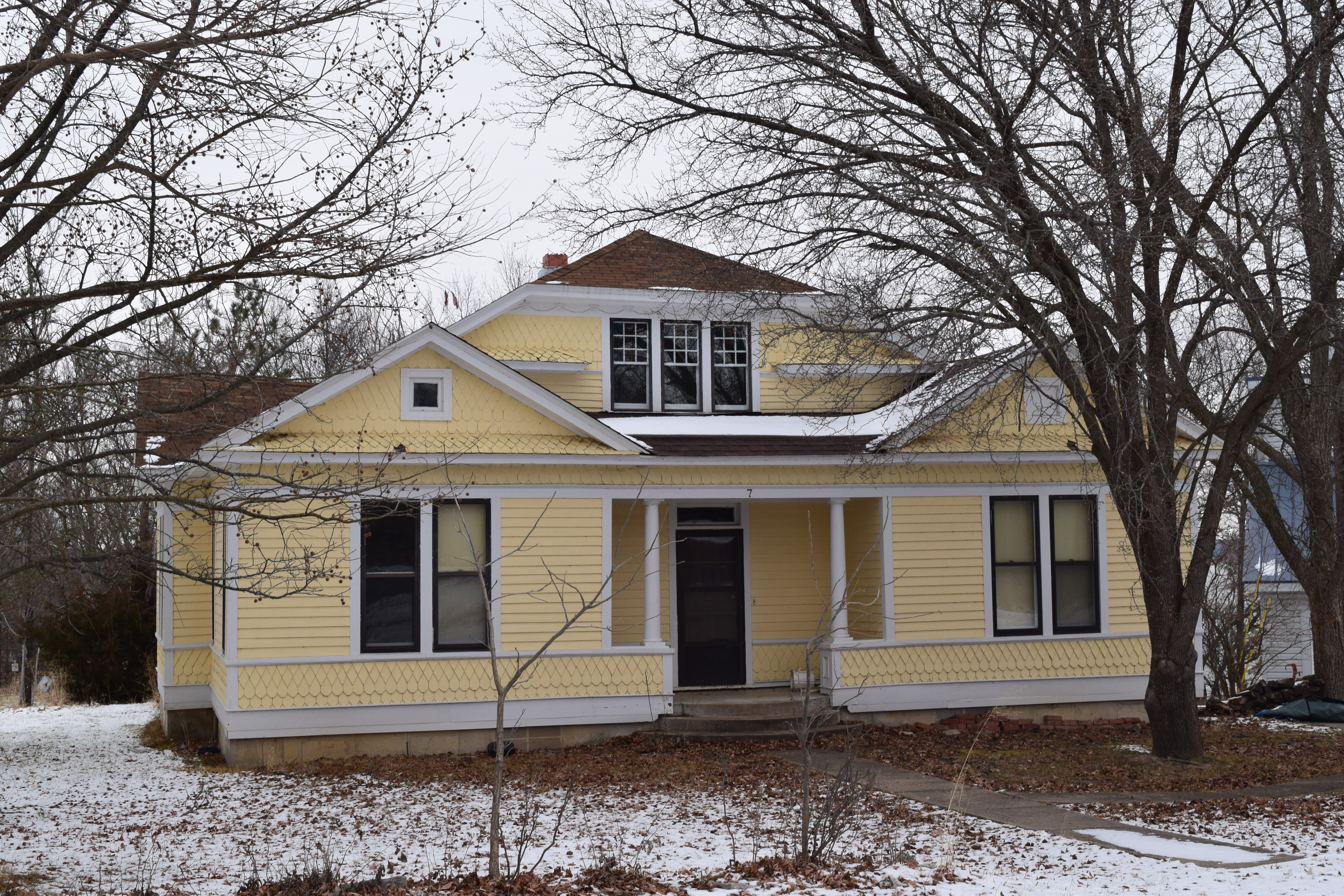

- Location within Missouri Location within the United States
- Location: Off MO 107, Florida, Missouri
- Coordinates: 39°29′37″N 91°47′6″W
- Area: less than one acre
- Built: 1902
- Architect: Violette, Mrs M.A.; Multiple
- Architectural style: Queen Anne
- NRHP reference No.: 83001031
- Added to NRHP: September 8, 1983

Merritt Violette House, also known as Merritt "Dad" Violette House, is a historic home located at Florida, Monroe County, Missouri. It was built in 1902–1903, and is a one-story, eclectic vernacular Queen Anne style frame dwelling with attic. It is sheathed in clapboard and fishscale shingles and has a complex hipped and gable roof. The house has a cross-in-square plan. It was the home of Merritt Violette, who saved Mark Twain's birthplace for the nation and instigated the Mark Twain State Park, and who built two camps for the Camp Fire Girls.

It was listed on the National Register of Historic Places in 1983.
