= Crigler Mound Group =

- Crigler Mound Group Archeological Site
- U.S. National Register of Historic Places
- Location within Missouri Location within the United States
- Location: Crigler Cemetery
- Nearest city: Florida, Missouri
- Coordinates: 39°30′45″N 91°45′2″W
- Area: 6 acres (2.4 ha)
- NRHP reference No.: 69000115
- Added to NRHP: May 21, 1969

The Crigler Mound Group is an important archaeological site in the northeastern part of the U.S. state of Missouri. Located in the Salt River valley near Mark Twain Lake, these burial mounds have been named a historic site.

In the 1960s, the Crigler mounds were seemingly the largest and best-preserved group within what was soon projected to become the Joanna Reservoir. The site occupies a high hilltop approximately 1,500 feet (460 m) north of the original Salt River bed. Composed of seven large mounds, the entire group covers an area nearly 500 feet (150 m) long, in and around the Crigler Cemetery north of the village of Florida; six are made solely of earth, while one includes substantial rocky components. The mounds are in a straight line with an orientation of 320°, or approximately northwest. The mound on the southern end of the group, designated No. 1, is a circle 23 feet (7.0 m) in diameter and 4 feet (1.2 m) high, with a slight depression in the center. Mound No. 2 is a flat-topped circle measuring 48 feet (15 m) by 4.5 feet (1.4 m). A depression similar to the one in No. 1 is found atop Mound No. 3, a circle measuring 39 feet (12 m) by 2 feet (0.61 m) and the only mound composed partly of rock; surveyors in the 1960s deemed the depression evidence that there had formerly been a structure within the mound that had collapsed. No. 4 is 90 feet (27 m) long by 55 feet (17 m) wide and 8 feet (2.4 m) high; it has been damaged by rodents burrowing into its side. Mound No. 5 is 40 feet (12 m) in diameter and 4 feet (1.2 m) high. The top and center portion is almost flat and slightly depressed. Mound No. 6 is 32 feet (9.8 m) in diameter and 2 feet (0.61 m) high, and it too is flat-topped with a slightly sunken center. Mound No. 7 was approximately 32 feet in diameter and 2 feet high, but the construction of a roadway necessitated the grading of most of the mound; only about 25% of the original mound survives. No bones or artifacts were found when the grading was performed, and no other excavations have been conducted in living memory, if ever.

On May 21, 1969, the Crigler Mound Group was listed on the National Register of Historic Places because of its archaeological value. The site was one of the first two Monroe County sites listed on the Register, along with the Mark Twain Birthplace State Historic Site in Florida, which gained the designation on the same day.
