= Marlborough, Missouri =

- Village
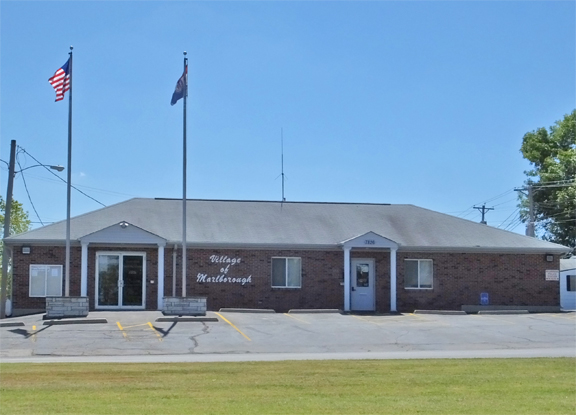
- Marlborough, Missouri

- Location of Marlborough, Missouri
- Coordinates: 38°34′06″N 90°20′21″W
- Country: United States
- State: Missouri
- County: St. Louis
- Townships: Gravois, Jefferson

Area
  - Total: 0.23 sq mi (0.59 km^{2})
  - Land: 0.23 sq mi (0.59 km^{2})
  - Water: 0 sq mi (0.00 km^{2})
- Elevation: 535 ft (163 m)

Population (2020)
  - Total: 2,221
  - Density: 9,780/sq mi (3,776/km^{2})
- Time zone: UTC-6 (Central (CST))
  - Summer (DST): UTC-5 (CDT)
- ZIP codes: 63119, 63123
- Area code(s): 314/557
- FIPS code: 29-46208
- GNIS feature ID: 2399260
- Website: marlboroughmo.gov

Marlborough is a village in Gravois and Jefferson townships, St. Louis County, Missouri, United States. The population was 2,221 at the 2020 census.

== Geography ==
According to the United States Census Bureau, the village has a total area of 0.23 square miles (0.60 km^{2}). All of this is land.

== Demographics ==
Historical population
Census	Pop.	Note	%±
1950	219		—
1960	650		196.8%
1970	1,492		129.5%
1980	2,012		34.9%
1990	1,949		−3.1%
2000	2,235		14.7%
2010	2,179		−2.5%
2020	2,221		1.9%
U.S. Decennial Census

=== Racial and ethnic composition ===
Marlborough village, Missouri – Racial and ethnic composition Note: the US Census treats Hispanic/Latino as an ethnic category. This table excludes Latinos from the racial categories and assigns them to a separate category. Hispanics/Latinos may be of any race.
Race / Ethnicity (NH = Non-Hispanic)	Pop 2000	Pop 2010	Pop 2020	% 2000	% 2010	% 2020
White alone (NH)	1,739	1,679	1,594	77.81%	77.05%	71.77%
Black or African American alone (NH)	112	177	279	5.01%	8.12%	12.56%
Native American or Alaska Native alone (NH)	4	6	1	0.18%	0.28%	0.05%
Asian alone (NH)	259	146	107	11.59%	6.70%	4.82%
Native Hawaiian or Pacific Islander alone (NH)	0	0	0	0.00%	0.00%	0.00%
Other race alone (NH)	7	3	10	0.31%	0.14%	0.45%
Mixed race or Multiracial (NH)	50	47	104	2.24%	2.16%	4.68%
Hispanic or Latino (any race)	64	121	126	2.86%	5.55%	5.67%
Total	2,235	2,179	2,221	100.00%	100.00%	100.00%

=== 2020 census ===
As of the 2020 census, Marlborough had a population of 2,221. The median age was 35.1 years. 10.4% of residents were under the age of 18 and 15.3% of residents were 65 years of age or older. For every 100 females there were 93.5 males, and for every 100 females age 18 and over there were 94.2 males age 18 and over.

100.0% of residents lived in urban areas, while 0.0% lived in rural areas.

There were 1,391 households in Marlborough, of which 12.1% had children under the age of 18 living in them. Of all households, 17.4% were married-couple households, 34.7% were households with a male householder and no spouse or partner present, and 37.6% were households with a female householder and no spouse or partner present. About 58.8% of all households were made up of individuals and 12.6% had someone living alone who was 65 years of age or older.

There were 1,446 housing units, of which 3.8% were vacant. The homeowner vacancy rate was 1.1% and the rental vacancy rate was 2.8%.

=== 2010 census ===
As of the census of 2010, there were 2,179 people, 1,330 households, and 394 families living in the village. The population density was 9,473.9 inhabitants per square mile (3,657.9/km^{2}). Marlborough is the most densely populated community in the state of Missouri. There were 1,456 housing units at an average density of 6,330.4 per square mile (2,444.2/km^{2}). The racial makeup of the village was 80.0% White, 8.2% African American, 0.4% Native American, 6.7% Asian, 2.1% from other races, and 2.6% from two or more races. Hispanic or Latino of any race were 5.6% of the population.

There were 1,330 households, of which 13.0% had children under the age of 18 living with them, 18.6% were married couples living together, 8.2% had a female householder with no husband present, 2.9% had a male householder with no wife present, and 70.4% were non-families. 57.7% of all households were made up of individuals, and 7.4% had someone living alone who was 65 years of age or older. The average household size was 1.64 and the average family size was 2.59.

The median age in the village was 31.6 years. 11.7% of residents were under the age of 18; 19.8% were between the ages of 18 and 24; 36.8% were from 25 to 44; 22.6% were from 45 to 64; and 9% were 65 years of age or older. The gender makeup of the village was 48.4% male and 51.6% female.

=== 2000 census ===
As of the census of 2000, there were 2,235 people, 1,344 households, and 426 families living in the village. The population density was 9,829.4 inhabitants per square mile (3,795.2/km^{2}). There were 1,422 housing units at an average density of 6,253.9 per square mile (2,414.6/km^{2}). The racial makeup of the village was 79.60% White, 5.06% African American, 0.18% Native American, 11.59% Asian, 1.12% from other races, and 2.46% from two or more races. Hispanic or Latino of any race were 2.86% of the population.

There were 1,344 households, out of which 13.2% had children under the age of 18 living with them, 20.8% were married couples living together, 7.9% had a female householder with no husband present, and 68.3% were non-families. 58.3% of all households were made up of individuals, and 8.2% had someone living alone who was 65 years of age or older. The average household size was 1.66 and the average family size was 2.61.

In the village, the population was spread out, with 12.5% under the age of 18, 19.4% from 18 to 24, 39.3% from 25 to 44, 18.7% from 45 to 64, and 10.1% who were 65 years of age or older. The median age was 32 years. For every 100 females, there were 99.6 males. For every 100 females age 18 and over, there were 101.2 males.

The median income for a household in the village was $25,386, and the median income for a family was $40,331. Males had a median income of $27,155 versus $24,112 for females. The per capita income for the village was $18,442. About 11.4% of families and 15.4% of the population were below the poverty line, including 27.8% of those under age 18 and 1.6% of those age 65 or over.
