= Jefferson Township, Oklahoma =

Jefferson Township is the name of 7 townships in the U.S. state of Oklahoma:

- Jefferson Township, Caddo County, Oklahoma
- Jefferson Township, Coal County, Oklahoma
- Jefferson Township, Cotton County, Oklahoma
- Jefferson Township, Ellis County, Oklahoma
- Jefferson Township, Washington County, Oklahoma
- Jefferson Township, Woods County, Oklahoma
- Jefferson Township, Woodward County, Oklahoma

== See also ==
- Jefferson Township (disambiguation)
