= Ralph Shropshire =

Professional baseball player (1911-1973)

- Catcher
- Born: January 4, 1911; Paris, Missouri, U.S.
- Died: March 11, 1973 (aged 62); Fort Worth, Texas, U.S.
- Batted: Unknown Threw: Unknown

Negro league baseball debut
- 1937, for the St. Louis Stars

Last appearance
- 1937, for the St. Louis Stars

Teams
- St. Louis Stars (1937)

Ralph Adolph Shropshire (January 4, 1911 - March 11, 1973) was an American professional baseball catcher in the Negro leagues. He played with the St. Louis Stars in 1937.
