= Belle Johnson =

American photographer (1864–1945)

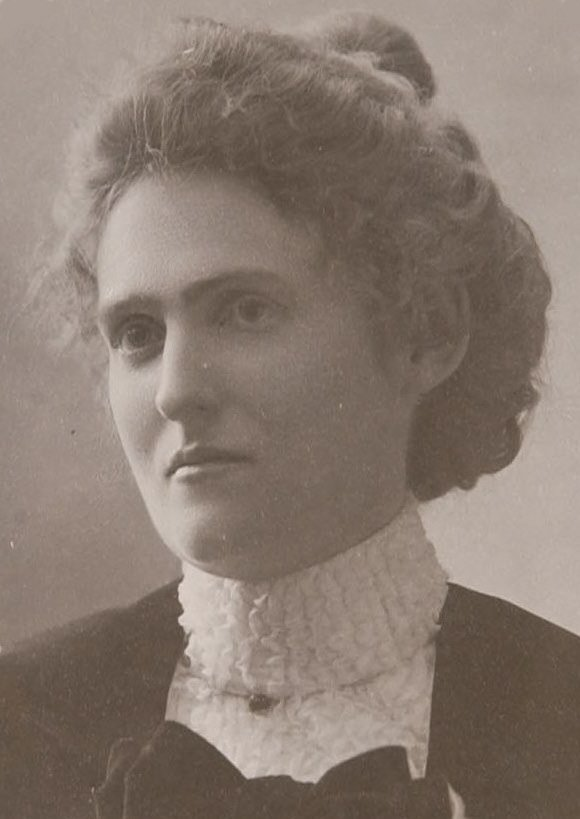
- Self-portrait, 1898
- Born: August 4, 1864; Mendota, Illinois, United States
- Died: July 19, 1945 (aged 80); Monroe City, Missouri, United States
- Resting place: St. Jude's Cemetery; Monroe City, Missouri
- Education: Saint Mary's College
- Occupation: Photographer

Belle Johnson (August 4, 1864 – July 19, 1945) was an American photographer, active primarily in the late 19th and early 20th centuries. Described as "eccentric, independent and unorthodox," Johnson was a charter member of the Federation of Women Photographers, and has been inducted into the Missouri Photojournalism Hall of Fame. Her work, which included character studies, photographs of animals (especially cats), and still lifes, won numerous awards and frequently appeared in contemporary photography journals in the early 1900s.

== Life ==
Johnson was born in Mendota, Illinois, to George C. Johnson, a successful farmer, and his wife, Hanna. She attended Saint Mary's College in South Bend, Indiana, from 1882 to 1884, graduating at the top of her class. Afterward, she worked as a teacher, but found it unfulfilling.

While spending the summer with her sister, Mary Walker, in Monroe City, Missouri, in 1890, Johnson answered a newspaper ad for an assistant at Rippey's photography studio. After just three weeks on the job, she bought the studio, with the understanding that the previous owner would stay on for a year to teach her the trade. He stayed for only six months, however, providing such scant instruction that Johnson later recalled that she had welcomed his departure. She subsequently learned primarily from photography magazines.

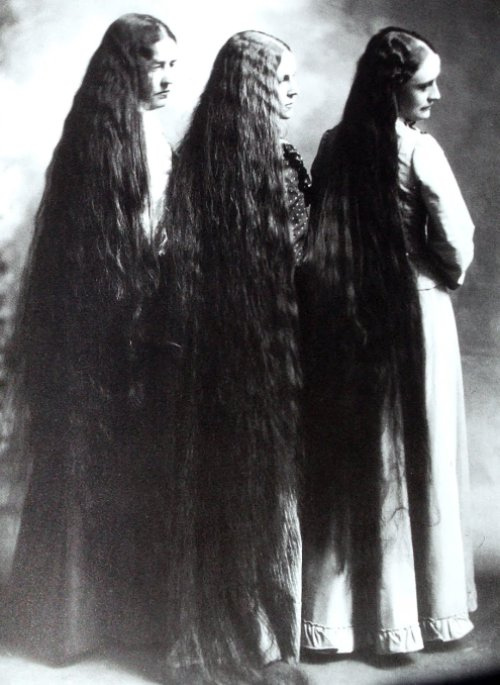
Three Women

Johnson was a charter member of the Photographers' Association of Missouri in 1894. At the group's statewide convention that year, Johnson's photographs won third place out of thirty-five entries, and missed first place by a narrow margin. In 1899, she won a gold medal at the Association's state convention, and was elected the group's treasurer. After a fire destroyed her studio that same year, she worked briefly in a photography studio established by local cigar maker, C.S. Robertshaw. By 1901 she was again advertising under her own name. In 1902, she opened an elaborate new studio on the floor above the jewelry store of her brother-in-law, R. Manning Walker.

In 1904, Johnson photographed the St. Louis World's Fair for a booklet distributed by the Missouri State Commission. In 1906, she was one of twenty-five photographers (and the only woman) invited to exhibit at the Photographers' Association of America's annual convention at Niagara Falls. She exhibited again at the PAA's Dayton convention the following year. Johnson was a member of the Missouri delegation at the PAA convention in Rochester in 1909, and was elected the first vice president of the PAA's Federation of Women Photographers. Her work was displayed at the National Photographers' Exhibition in Toronto in 1910, and received praise at the PAA's Art Exhibit in 1913.

Johnson frequently traveled to stay up-to-date on the latest photography techniques. In 1913, she attended the Eastman Photographic School in Illinois, and began advertising Kodak printing services that same year. She won third prize in the 1913 Kodak Advertising Competition.

In the early 1910s, Johnson made plans to establish a new studio in Pittsburg, Missouri, in partnership with Roy Moose, though these plans never materialized. By 1914, Johnson had won over 30 gold and silver medals in various photographic competitions. She was a member of the Missouri delegation at the PAA's Milwaukee convention in 1920, and three of her photos were displayed at the PAA'S 1930 convention. Among her last published works were photographs of local soldiers preparing to depart to fight in World War II in the early 1940s. She died in her studio on July 19, 1945. Businesses in Monroe City closed on the day of her funeral.

== Works ==
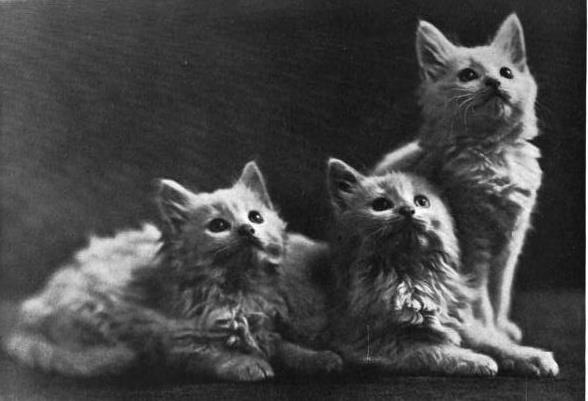
Kittens, photographed by Johnson, c. 1915

Historian Dean Howd noted that while Johnson earned money by taking individual and family portraits, she also created a "unique body of creative studio portraits and studies." She initially specialized in cabinet cards produced using the "Aristo" process (which rendered the photos less likely to fade than albumen prints). She later advertised penny pictures, photo buttons, and post cards. In 1912, she began using a Graflex camera equipped with an Eastern Optical lens. Throughout the early 1900s, Johnson worked with an assistant, Julia McClintic, who did much of the studio's retouching, and managed the studio in Johnson's absence.

Johnson's favorite subjects included animals (especially cats), flowers, and character studies. Howd notes that her photographs were "carefully staged and controlled in terms of light," and that her subjects appear relaxed and natural. She received considerable praise from contemporaries for her cat photos, especially for her ability to get cats to pose in various ways. Johnson's best-known photograph, Three Women, has appeared in numerous publications, including Naomi Rosenblum's A History of Women Photographers. According to Rosenblum, the photo suggests that Johnson either "could rise above the conventional poses demanded by small-town clients," or that "her sitters were not as orthodox as one might suppose."

Johnson's studio, built in 1902, featured a 20-foot (6.1 m) by 24-foot (7.3 m) operating room equipped with props and a large skylight. The adjacent reception room had a polished red oak floor and walls adorned with thick green curtains and Johnson's photography. The studio's darkroom utilized porcelain tubs, and was lit by a single pane of red glass. Johnson frequently hosted club meetings and other events at the studio.

Most of Johnson's negatives were lost when her studio was dismantled following her death. The Massillon Museum in Massillon, Ohio, holds a collection of 160 photographs Johnson had sent to her friend, William K. Bennett, just before she died. The State Historical Society of Missouri also maintains a small collection of her photographs.

== Gallery ==
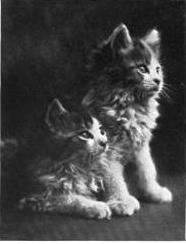
Kittens

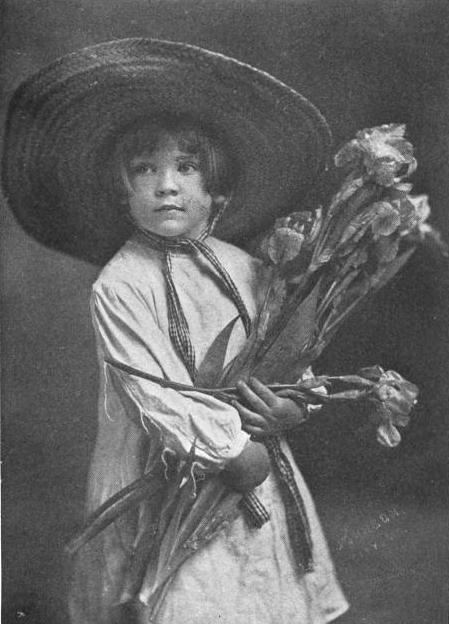
Childhood

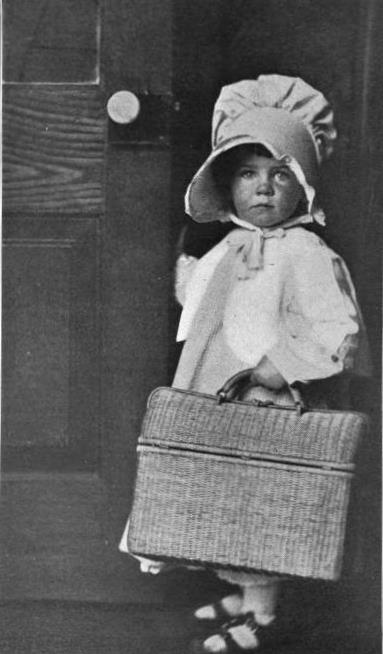
All Ready for the Picnic

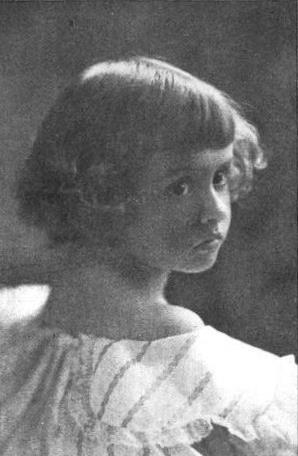
Innocence
