= Guy Curtright =

American baseball player (1912–1997)

- Outfielder
- Born: October 18, 1912; Holliday, Missouri, U.S.
- Died: August 23, 1997 (aged 84); Sun City Center, Florida, U.S.
- Batted: Right Threw: Right

MLB debut
- April 21, 1943, for the Chicago White Sox

Last MLB appearance
- July 18, 1946, for the Chicago White Sox

MLB statistics
- Batting average: .276
- Home runs: 9
- Runs batted in: 108
- Stats at Baseball Reference

Teams
- Chicago White Sox (1943–1946)

Guy Paxton Curtright (October 18, 1912 – August 23, 1997) was an American professional baseball left fielder in Major League Baseball who played for the Chicago White Sox (1943–1946). Born in Holliday, Missouri, he threw and batted right-handed, stood 5 feet 11 inches (1.80 m) tall and weighed 180 pounds (82 kg).

== Career ==
A rookie at age 30, it was a long way for Curtright, who spent 11 seasons in the minors before make his way to major league with the Chicago White Sox. As a rookie in 1943, his only season as a regular, he hit .291 (6th in the American League) and posted career-highs in runs (67), hits (142), doubles (20), runs batted in (48), stolen bases (13) and games played (138), including a 26-game hitting streak.

In his four-season MLB career, Curtright was a .276 hitter with nine home runs and 108 RBI in 331 games.

== Death ==
Curtright died in Sun City Center, Florida, at the age of 84.
