= Holliday, Missouri =

- Village
- Location in Monroe County and the state of Missouri
- Coordinates: 39°29′37″N 92°07′53″W
- Country: United States
- State: Missouri
- County: Monroe

Area
  - Total: 0.26 sq mi (0.68 km^{2})
  - Land: 0.26 sq mi (0.68 km^{2})
  - Water: 0 sq mi (0.00 km^{2})
- Elevation: 784 ft (239 m)

Population (2020)
  - Total: 114
  - Density: 436.5/sq mi (168.53/km^{2})
- Time zone: UTC-6 (Central (CST))
  - Summer (DST): UTC-5 (CDT)
- ZIP code: 65258
- Area code: 660
- FIPS code: 29-32626
- GNIS feature ID: 2398526

Holliday is a village in Monroe County, Missouri, United States. The population was 114 at the 2020 census.

== History ==
Holliday was platted in 1877 and named after Thompson Holliday, a local merchant. A post office called Holliday has been in operation since 1873.

The Holliday Petroglyphs near the village were added to the National Register of Historic Places in 1974.

== Geography ==
Holliday is located in western Monroe County at 39°29′34″N 92°7′47″W (39.492854, -92.129773). It is 1 mile (1.6 km) north of U.S. Route 24 on State Highway A. Paris, the Monroe county seat, is 7 miles (11 km) east on US 24, and Moberly is 18 miles (29 km) to the west.

According to the U.S. Census Bureau, the village has a total area of 0.26 square miles (0.67 km^{2}), all land.

== Demographics ==
Historical population
Census	Pop.	Note	%±
1880	115		—
1890	254		120.9%
1900	585		130.3%
1910	262		−55.2%
1920	260		−0.8%
1930	220		−15.4%
1940	207		−5.9%
1950	196		−5.3%
1960	181		−7.7%
1970	167		−7.7%
1980	168		0.6%
1990	139		−17.3%
2000	129		−7.2%
2010	137		6.2%
2020	114		−16.8%
U.S. Decennial Census

=== 2010 census ===
As of the census of 2010, there were 137 people, 59 households, and 41 families living in the village. The population density was 526.9 inhabitants per square mile (203.4/km^{2}). There were 71 housing units at an average density of 273.1 per square mile (105.4/km^{2}). The racial makeup of the village was 98.5% White, 0.7% African American, and 0.7% Native American.

There were 59 households, of which 28.8% had children under the age of 18 living with them, 50.8% were married couples living together, 6.8% had a female householder with no husband present, 11.9% had a male householder with no wife present, and 30.5% were non-families. 27.1% of all households were made up of individuals, and 5.1% had someone living alone who was 65 years of age or older. The average household size was 2.32 and the average family size was 2.71.

The median age in the village was 44.2 years. 24.1% of residents were under the age of 18; 5.9% were between the ages of 18 and 24; 21.9% were from 25 to 44; 27% were from 45 to 64; and 21.2% were 65 years of age or older. The gender makeup of the village was 50.4% male and 49.6% female.

=== 2000 census ===
As of the census of 2000, there were 129 people, 55 households, and 39 families living in the village. The population density was 496.2 inhabitants per square mile (191.6/km^{2}). There were 74 housing units at an average density of 284.7 per square mile (109.9/km^{2}). The racial makeup of the village was 100.00% White. Hispanic or Latino of any race were 0.78% of the population.

There were 55 households, out of which 25.5% had children under the age of 18 living with them, 70.9% were married couples living together, 1.8% had a female householder with no husband present, and 27.3% were non-families. 25.5% of all households were made up of individuals, and 10.9% had someone living alone who was 65 years of age or older. The average household size was 2.35 and the average family size was 2.80.

In the village, the population was spread out, with 19.4% under the age of 18, 8.5% from 18 to 24, 24.8% from 25 to 44, 33.3% from 45 to 64, and 14.0% who were 65 years of age or older. The median age was 44 years. For every 100 females, there were 104.8 males. For every 100 females age 18 and over, there were 100.0 males.

The median income for a household in the village was $26,250, and the median income for a family was $34,375. Males had a median income of $26,250 versus $15,625 for females. The per capita income for the village was $13,266. There were 11.1% of families and 15.3% of the population living below the poverty line, including 34.6% of under eighteens and none of those over 64.

== Notable people ==
- Guy Curtright (b. October 18, 1912), Major League Baseball player for the Chicago White Sox
