= Paris Male Academy =

- U.S. National Register of Historic Places
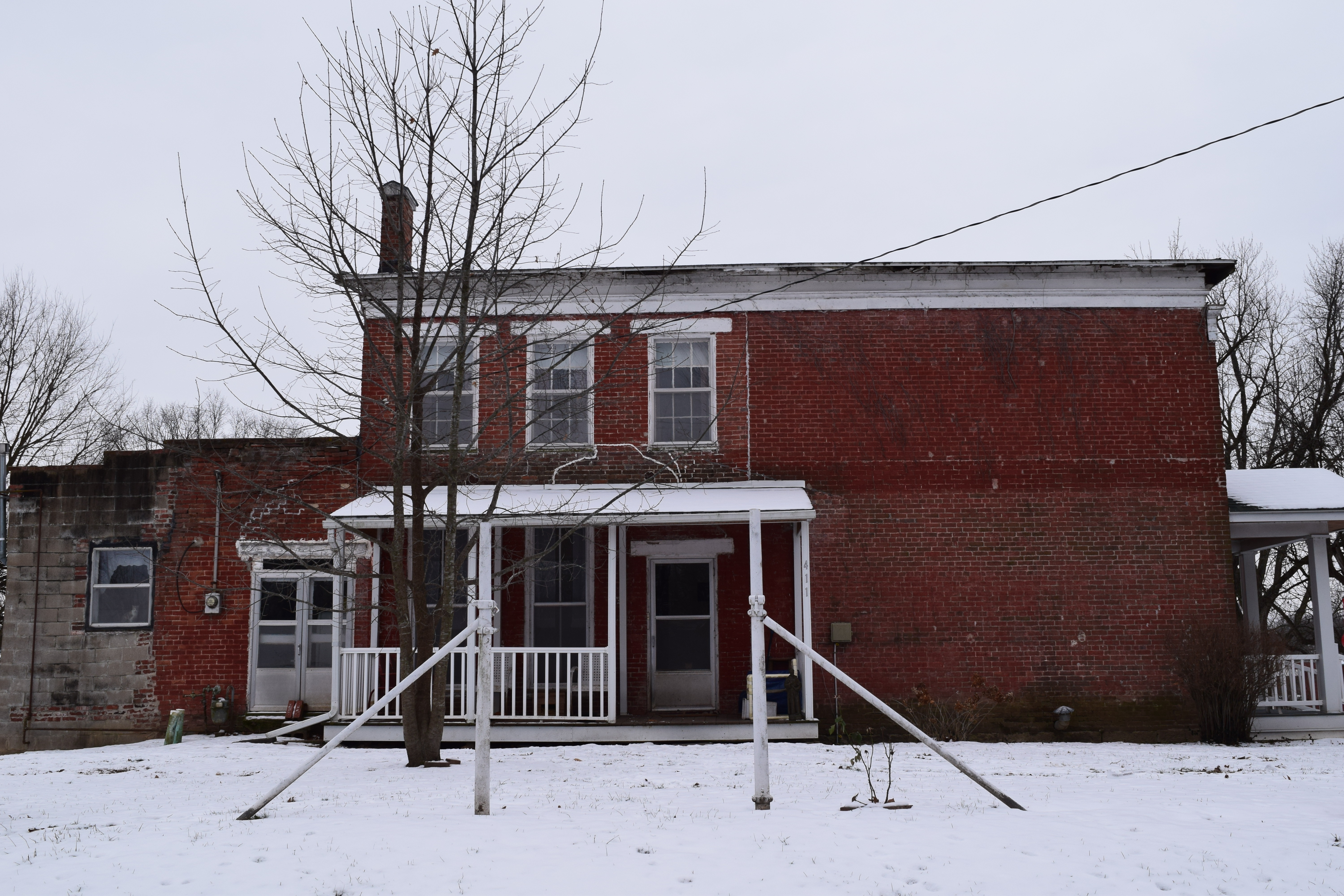

- Location within Missouri Location within the United States
- Location: 411 E. Monroe St., Paris, Missouri
- Coordinates: 39°28′56″N 91°59′40″W
- Area: 1.3 acres (0.53 ha)
- Built: 1854
- Architectural style: Greek Revival
- NRHP reference No.: 90001103
- Added to NRHP: July 19, 1990

Paris Male Academy, also known as the Nimrod Ashcraft House, is a historic school building located at Paris, Monroe County, Missouri.

== History ==
The Paris Male Academy is a Greek Revival style, two-story, three-bay, side passage plan, brick building with a rear addition, built in 1854. It has a front gable roof and four brick pilasters on the front facade. The building housed the Paris Male Academy until 1869, after which it became a private residence.

The Academy is significant under criterion A, in the area of Education, as it delivered a high level of education to students from the local area; and under criterion C, in the area of Architecture, as a rare surviving example of a building employed for private education in Missouri.

It was listed on the National Register of Historic Places on January 24, 1990.
