= St. Jude's Episcopal Church =

Historic church in Missouri, United States

- U.S. National Register of Historic Places
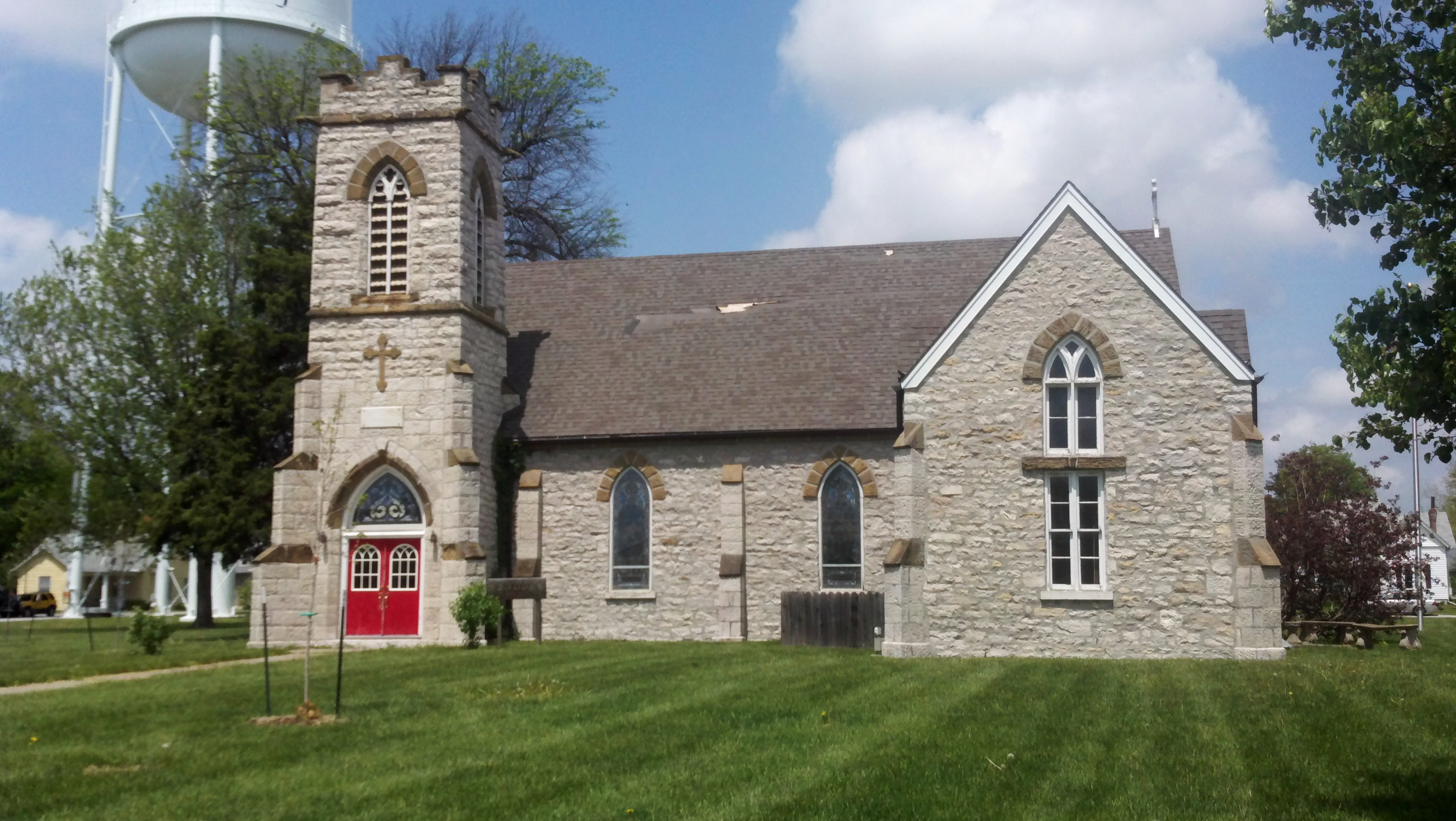

- Location within Missouri Location within the United States
- Location: 301 N. Main St., Monroe City, Missouri
- Coordinates: 39°39′16″N 91°44′5″W
- Area: less than one acre
- Built: 1867
- Architect: Scheetz, Frederick B.
- Architectural style: Gothic
- NRHP reference No.: 00001397
- Added to NRHP: November 22, 2000

St. Jude's Episcopal Church is a historic Episcopal church located at 301 North Main Street in Monroe City, Monroe County, Missouri. It was built in 1867, with the south transept added in 1877 and two-story bell tower added in 1904. It is an asymmetrical, one-story Gothic Revival style limestone building. It features crenellation, stepped buttresses and lancet windows with stained glass.

It was listed on the National Register of Historic Places in 2000.
