= Farmers and Merchants Bank Building (Monroe City, Missouri) =

- U.S. National Register of Historic Places
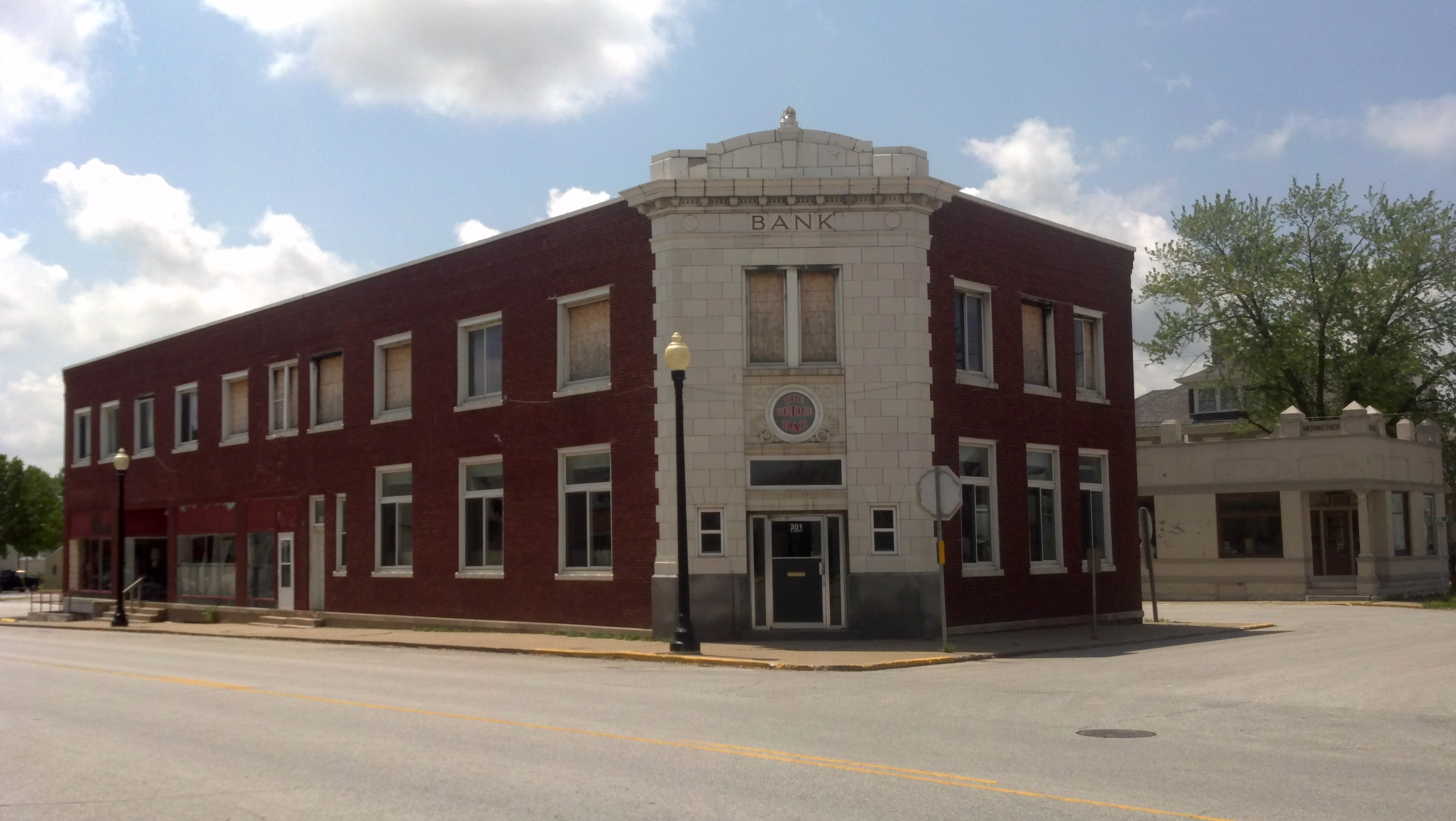
- Farmer's and Merchant's Bank, September 2014

- Location within Missouri Location within the United States
- Location: 201-207 S. Main St., Monroe City, Missouri
- Coordinates: 39°39′08″N 91°44′5″W
- Area: less than one acre
- Built: 1917
- Architect: Knittel, Joseph, Company
- Architectural style: Two-part Commercial Block
- NRHP reference No.: 11001020
- Added to NRHP: January 12, 2012

Farmers and Merchants Bank Building, also known as The Wedge, is a historic bank building located at Monroe City, Monroe County, Missouri. It was erected in 1917, and is a wedge-shaped, flatiron building clad in tapestry brick. It features an impressive canted entrance covered in glazed terra cotta tile with a granite base.

It was listed on the National Register of Historic Places in 2012.
