= Salt River (Missouri) =

River in Missouri, U.S.

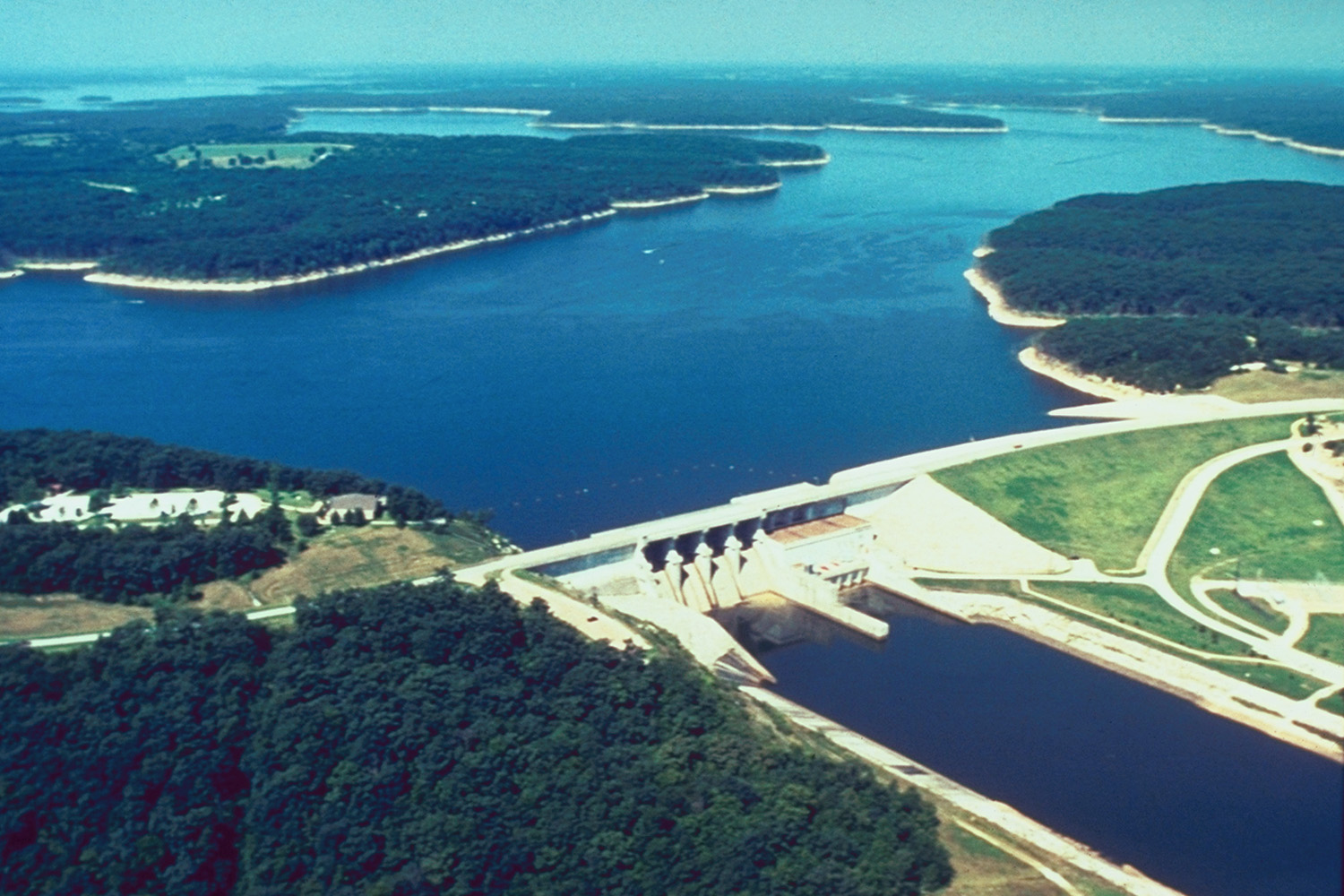

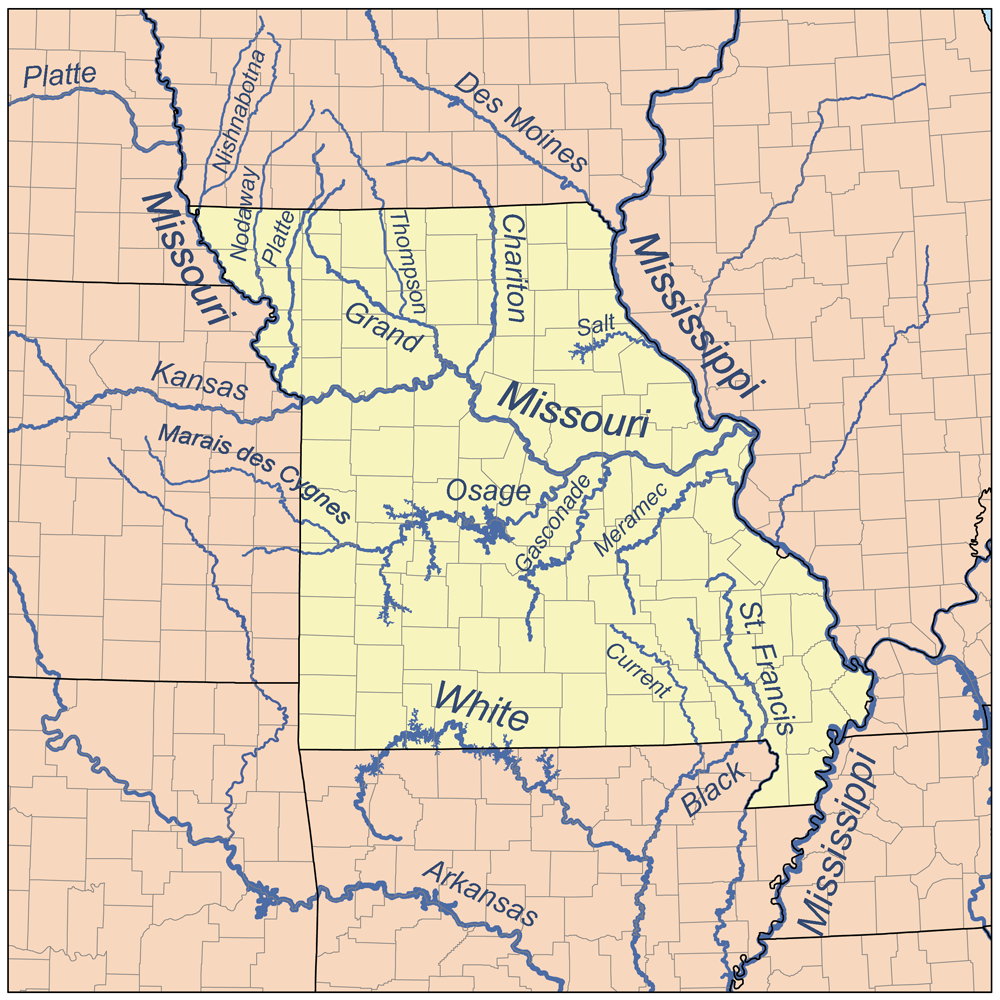
- Map showing major rivers in the state of Missouri. The Salt River is at the upper right near the Mississippi River.

Location
- Country: United States
- State: Missouri

Physical characteristics
- Source: Mark Twain Lake
  - location: Florida, Monroe County
  - coordinates: 39°30′07″N 91°46′51″W
  - elevation: 607 ft (185 m)
- Mouth: Mississippi River
  - location: Louisiana, Pike County
  - coordinates: 39°28′00″N 91°03′48″W
  - elevation: 449 ft (137 m)
- Length: 55 mi (89 km)
- Basin size: 2,518 sq mi (6,520 km^{2})
- Discharge
  - location: New London, MO
  - average: 2,120 cu ft/s (60 m^{3}/s)
  - minimum: 9.5 cu ft/s (0.27 m^{3}/s)
  - maximum: 107,000 cu ft/s (3,000 m^{3}/s)

The Salt River is a river in Pike, Ralls, and Monroe counties in Missouri, United States that is tributary of the Mississippi River. The river is approximately 55 miles (89 km) long and drains an area of 2,518 mi^{2} (6,520 km^{2}) in parts of twelve Missouri counties.

== Description ==
The river rises at the confluence of the North, Middle, and South Forks in Monroe County. Since Clarence Cannon Dam construction was completed in 1983, the first 15 miles of the Salt River after the confluence of the North, Middle, and South Fork have been contained in Mark Twain Lake. Below the dam, the river winds generally east for 63 miles through a rural valley surrounded by low bluffs. Below New London, it receives Spencer and Peno Creeks from the right. The Salt joins the Mississippi River at Ted Shanks Wildlife Conservation Area (River Mile 284) just one mile north of US Route 54 bridge in Louisiana in Pike County.

The river was called "Ohaha" by the Native Americans that once lived along its course. It was also known as "the river Jeffreon" in the 1804 Treaty of St. Louis. American author Mark Twain was born in the town of Florida on the Salt River in 1835.

River	Location	Discharge
North Fork Salt River	Shelbina	255 cu/ft. per sec.
Elk Fork Salt River	Paris	202 cu/ft. per sec.
Middle Fork Salt River	Paris	457 cu/ft. per sec.
South Fork Salt River	Santa Fe	313 cu/ft. per sec.

== See also ==
- List of rivers of Missouri
