= Holliday Petroglyphs =

- U.S. National Register of Historic Places
- Location: Northern half of the southeastern quarter of Section 34, Township 55 North, Range 11 West, northeast of Holliday, near Holliday, Missouri
- Area: 9.9 acres (4.0 ha)
- NRHP reference No.: 74001083
- Added to NRHP: January 11, 1974

Holliday Petroglyphs (23MN1) is a historic archeological site located near Holliday, Monroe County, Missouri. This site consists of a group of petroglyph (carved rock art) panels identified in 1944. Stone tools and pottery shards were found near the rock art.

It was added to the National Register of Historic Places in 1974.
