= Mark Twain Birthplace State Historic Site =

Historic house in Florida, Missouri

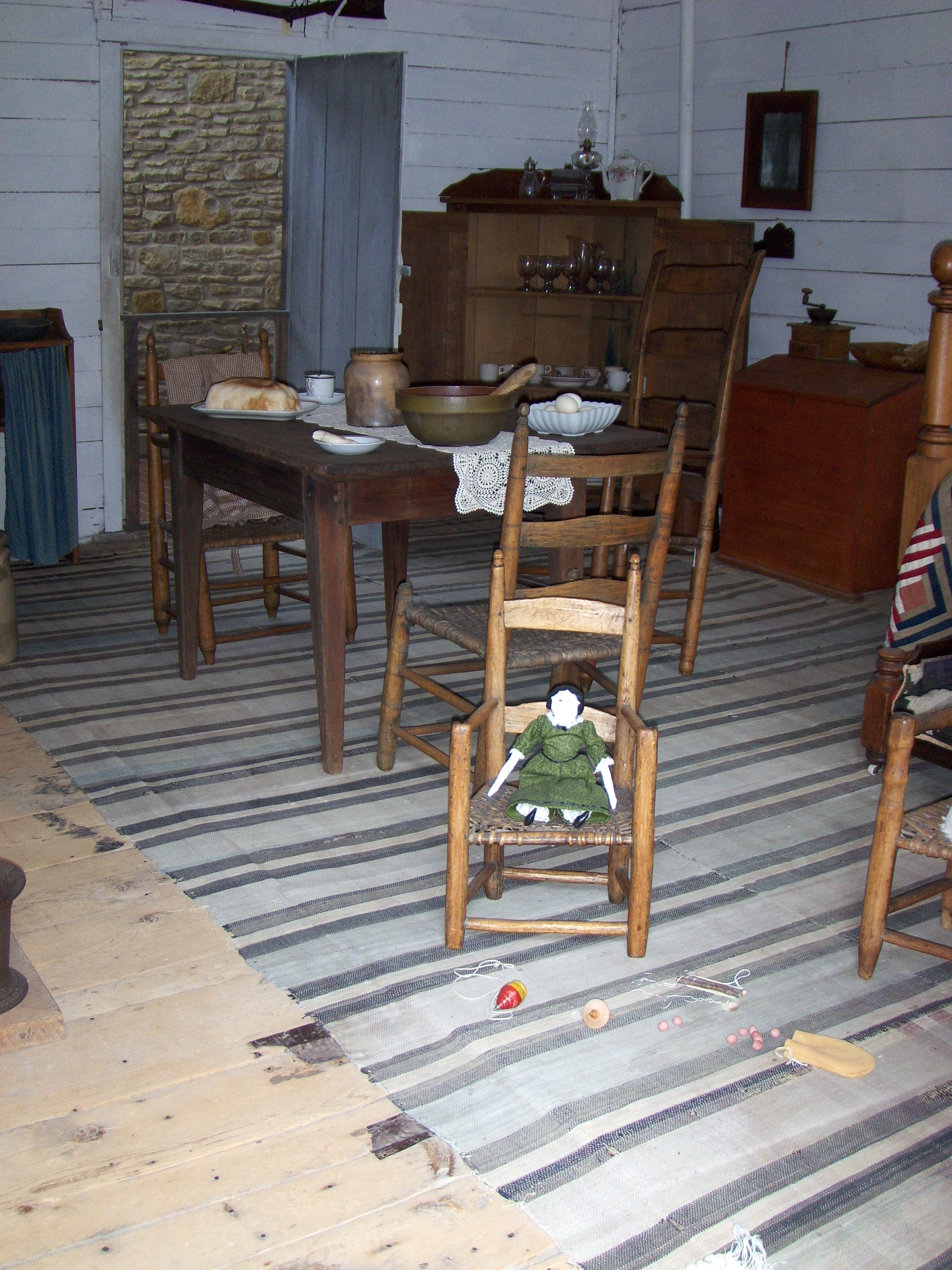
- An interior room of the cabin

- Location within Missouri Location within the United States
- Location: Jefferson Township, Monroe County, Missouri, United States
- Coordinates: 39°29′18″N 91°47′09″W
- Area: 13 acres (5.3 ha)
- Elevation: 633 ft (193 m)
- Established: 1924
- Visitors: 59,002 (in 2022)
- Operator: Missouri Department of Natural Resources
- Website: mostateparks.com/park/mark-twain-birthplace-state-historic-site
- Mark Twain Birthplace Cabin
- U.S. National Register of Historic Places
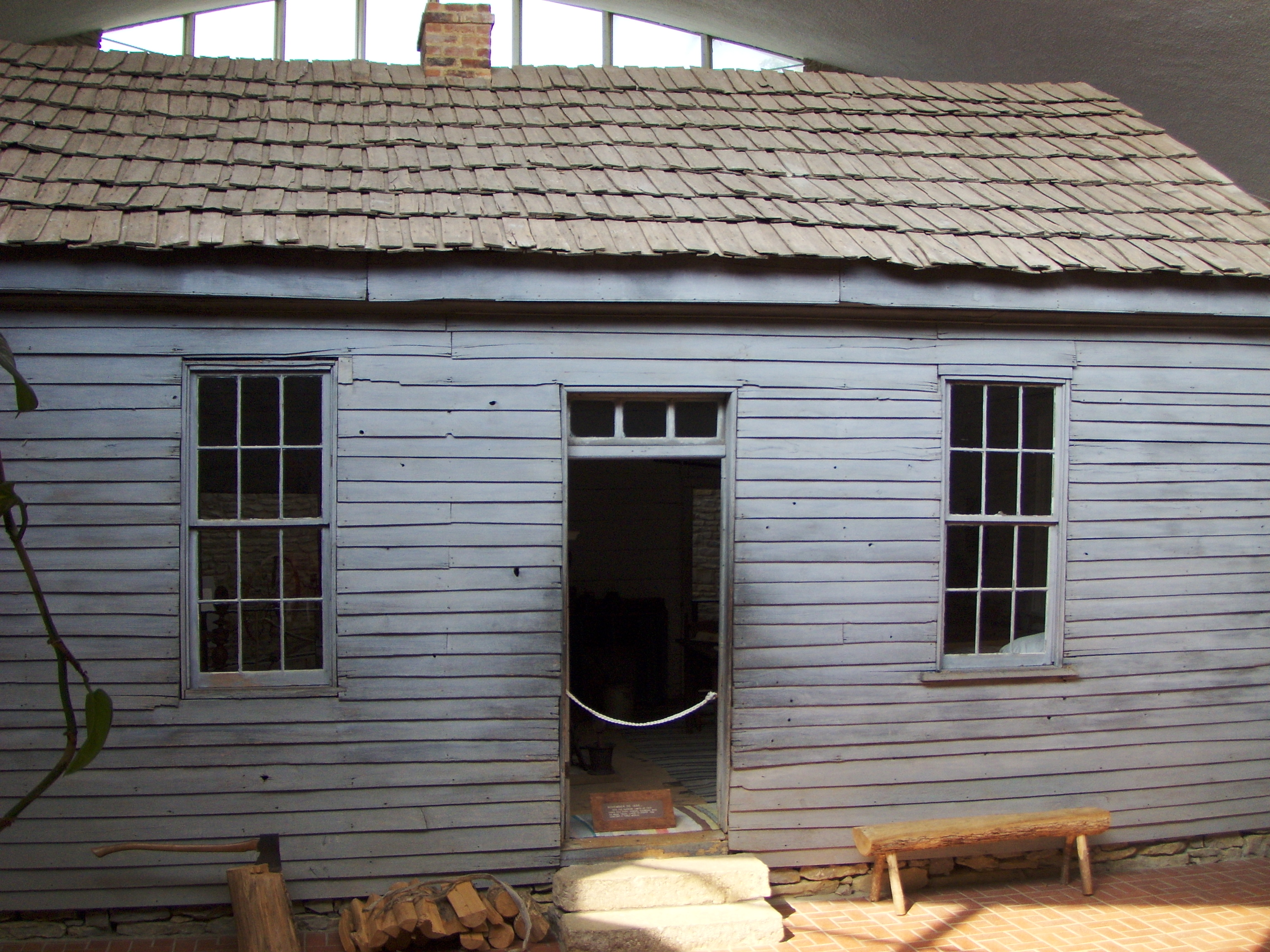
- NRHP reference No.: 69000116
- Added to NRHP: May 21, 1969

The Mark Twain Birthplace State Historic Site is a publicly owned property near Florida, Missouri, maintained by the Missouri Department of Natural Resources, that preserves the cabin where the author Samuel Langhorne Clemens was born in 1835. The cabin is protected within a modern museum building that also includes a public reading room, several of Twain's first editions, a handwritten manuscript of his 1876 novel The Adventures of Tom Sawyer, and furnishings from Twain's Connecticut home. The historic site is adjacent to Mark Twain State Park on a peninsula at the western end of man-made Mark Twain Lake. The cabin was listed on the National Register of Historic Places in 1969.

Samuel Clemens, later known by the pen name Mark Twain, was born in the two-room house on November 30, 1835. The house was rented by his parents Jane Lampton Clemens (1803–1890) and John Marshall Clemens (1798–1847). Clemens spent his first four years here until the family moved to a two-story clapboard house, now memorialized as the Mark Twain Boyhood Home & Museum in Hannibal, Missouri, in 1839.
