= Jefferson Township, Harrison County, Missouri =

Township in Harrison County, Missouri, U.S.

Jefferson Township
- Township
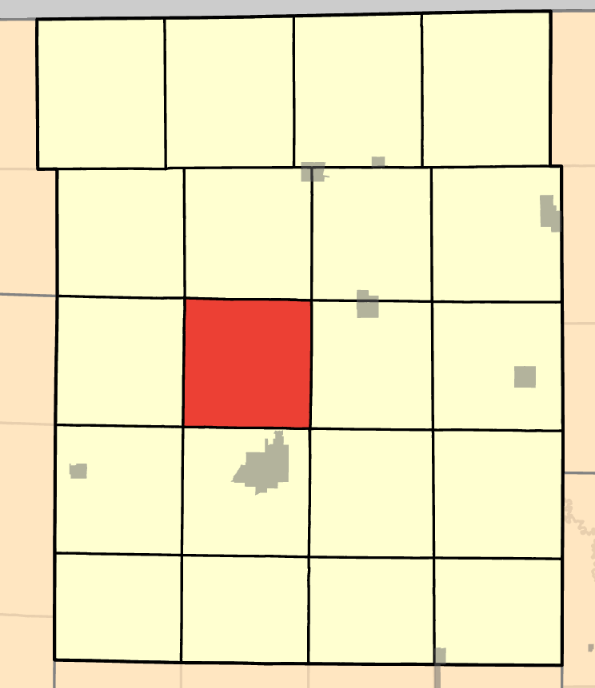
- Coordinates: 40°20′18″N 94°02′31″W
- Country: United States
- State: Missouri
- County: Harrison

Area
  - Total: 36.13 sq mi (93.6 km^{2})
  - Land: 35.84 sq mi (92.8 km^{2})
  - Water: 0.29 sq mi (0.75 km^{2}) 0.8%
- Elevation: 922 ft (281 m)

Population (2020)
  - Total: 300
  - Density: 8.4/sq mi (3.2/km^{2})
- FIPS code: 29-08136818
- GNIS feature ID: 766723

Jefferson Township is a township in Harrison County, Missouri, United States. At the 2020 census, its population was 300.

Jefferson Township was established in about 1845, taking its name from Thomas Jefferson, third President of the United States.
