= Jefferson Township, Wayne County, Missouri =

Township in Wayne County, Missouri, U.S.

Coordinates: 37.0350°N 90.1881°W

Jefferson Township is an inactive township in Wayne County, in the U.S. state of Missouri.

Jefferson Township has the name of President Thomas Jefferson.
