= Jefferson Township, Johnson County, Missouri =

Inactive township in the US state of Missouri

Coordinates: 38.62°N 93.5736°W

Jefferson Township is an inactive township in Johnson County, in the U.S. state of Missouri.

Jefferson Township was established in 1835, taking its name from President Thomas Jefferson.
