= Jefferson Township, Maries County, Missouri =

Township in Maries County, Missouri, U.S.

Jefferson Township
- Township (inactive)
- Location in Missouri
- Coordinates: 38°13′25″N 91°44′17″W
- Country: United States
- State: Missouri
- County: Maries County
- Time zone: UTC-6 (Central)
  - Summer (DST): UTC-5 (CDT)

Jefferson Township is an inactive township in Maries County, in the U.S. state of Missouri.

Jefferson Township has the name of Thomas Jefferson, third President of the United States.

== Geography ==
According to the United States Census Bureau, the township has a total area of 242.29 km^{2} (93.55 sq mi), of which 241.27 km^{2} (93.15 sq mi) is land and 1.02 km^{2} (0.39 sq mi) (0.42%) is water.
