= Jefferson Township, Polk County, Missouri =

Township in Polk County, Missouri, U.S.

Coordinates: 37.7725°N 93.4297°W

Jefferson Township is an inactive township in Polk County, in the U.S. state of Missouri.

Jefferson Township has the name of President Thomas Jefferson.
