= Paris, Missouri =

City in Missouri, U.S.

- City
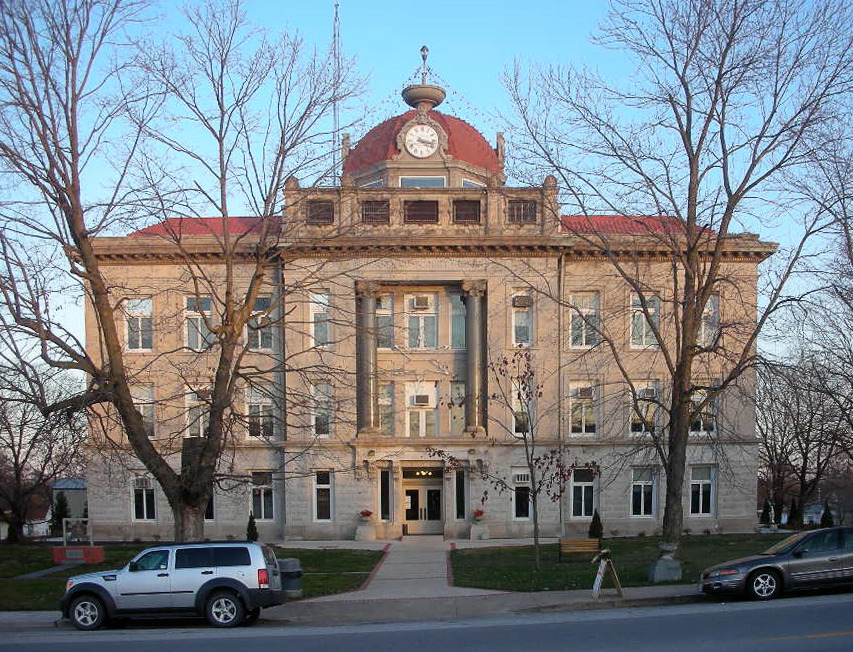
- The Monroe County Courthouse in Paris

- Location in Monroe County and the state of Missouri
- Coordinates: 39°28′39″N 92°0′14″W
- Country: United States
- State: Missouri
- County: Monroe

Area
  - Total: 1.27 sq mi (3.29 km^{2})
  - Land: 1.26 sq mi (3.27 km^{2})
  - Water: 0.0077 sq mi (0.02 km^{2})
- Elevation: 679 ft (207 m)

Population (2020)
  - Total: 1,161
  - Density: 918.9/sq mi (354.78/km^{2})
- Time zone: UTC-6 (Central (CST))
  - Summer (DST): UTC-5 (CDT)
- ZIP code: 65275
- Area code: 660
- FIPS code: 29-56144
- GNIS feature ID: 2396142
- Website: parismo.gov

Paris is a city in and the county seat of Monroe County, Missouri, United States. The population was 1,161 at the 2020 census.

== History ==
Paris was platted in 1831, and named after Paris, Kentucky, the native home of one of the first settlers, Mrs. James C. Fox. James R. Abernathy was one of the first settlers in Paris in 1831. The town was laid out in 1831 by Abernathy, James C. Fox, Hightower F. Hackney, and E. W. McBride. In 1837, Paris contained seven stores and a number of families. On March 10, 1832, Abernathy and seven others organized the first Christian church in Paris. The church was built in a Gothic style of brick with four rooms at a cost of $11,000 (equivalent to $354,750 in 2025).

A post office called Paris has been in operation since 1841.

The Paris Male Academy and Union Covered Bridge are listed on the National Register of Historic Places.

== Geography ==
Paris is in northeastern Missouri, in the center of Monroe County. U.S. Route 24 bypasses the city on the northwest side, leading northeast 21 miles (34 km) to Monroe City and west 26 miles (42 km) to Moberly. US 24 Business passes through the center of town, partly along Main Street. Missouri Route 15 passes through the center of Paris on Main Street, leading north 17 miles (27 km) to Shelbina and south 26 miles (42 km) to the city of Mexico. Missouri Route 154 leads east from Paris 19 miles (31 km) to Perry.

According to the U.S. Census Bureau, Paris has a total area of 1.27 square miles (3.29 km^{2}), of which 0.01 square miles (0.03 km^{2}), or 0.63%, are water. The Middle Fork of the Salt River forms the northern border of the city; the river flows into Mark Twain Lake 3 miles (5 km) to the east.

=== Climate ===
The climate in this area is characterized by hot, humid summers and generally mild to cool winters. According to the Köppen Climate Classification system, Paris has a humid subtropical climate, abbreviated "Cfa" on climate maps.

== Demographics ==
Historical population
Census	Pop.	Note	%±
1870	895		—
1880	1,253		40.0%
1890	1,487		18.7%
1900	1,397		−6.1%
1910	1,474		5.5%
1920	1,431		−2.9%
1930	1,367		−4.5%
1940	1,473		7.8%
1950	1,407		−4.5%
1960	1,393		−1.0%
1970	1,442		3.5%
1980	1,598		10.8%
1990	1,486		−7.0%
2000	1,529		2.9%
2010	1,220		−20.2%
2020	1,161		−4.8%
U.S. Decennial Census

=== 2010 census ===
As of the census of 2010, there were 1,220 people, 528 households, and 309 families living in the city. The population density was 983.9 inhabitants per square mile (379.9/km^{2}). There were 643 housing units at an average density of 518.5 per square mile (200.2/km^{2}). The racial makeup of the city was 93.7% White, 4.9% African American, 0.1% Native American, 0.2% Asian, 0.1% from other races, and 1.0% from two or more races. Hispanic or Latino of any race were 0.7% of the population.

There were 528 households, of which 24.8% had children under the age of 18 living with them, 43.2% were married couples living together, 10.4% had a female householder with no husband present, 4.9% had a male householder with no wife present, and 41.5% were non-families. 36.7% of all households were made up of individuals, and 21.8% had someone living alone who was 65 years of age or older. The average household size was 2.14 and the average family size was 2.77.

The median age in the city was 47.4 years. 19.8% of residents were under the age of 18; 6.9% were between the ages of 18 and 24; 21% were from 25 to 44; 24.5% were from 45 to 64; and 28% were 65 years of age or older. The gender makeup of the city was 43.8% male and 56.2% female.

=== 2000 census ===
As of the census of 2000, there were 1,529 people, 603 households, and 364 families living in the city. The population density was 1,228.5 inhabitants per square mile (474.3/km^{2}). There were 682 housing units at an average density of 548.0 per square mile (211.6/km^{2}). The racial makeup of the city was 92.15% White, 6.21% African American, 0.92% Native American, 0.07% Asian, and 0.65% from two or more races. Hispanic or Latino of any race were 0.46% of the population.

There were 603 households, out of which 27.0% had children under the age of 18 living with them, 48.4% were married couples living together, 9.1% had a female householder with no husband present, and 39.6% were non-families. 36.3% of all households were made up of individuals, and 22.6% had someone living alone who was 65 years of age or older. The average household size was 2.32 and the average family size was 3.03.

In the city, the population was spread out, with 22.8% under the age of 18, 7.3% from 18 to 24, 21.4% from 25 to 44, 20.0% from 45 to 64, and 28.5% who were 65 years of age or older. The median age was 44 years. For every 100 females, there were 84.7 males. For every 100 females age 18 and over, there were 77.7 males.

The median income for a household in the city was $29,556, and the median income for a family was $36,917. Males had a median income of $27,813 versus $18,580 for females. The per capita income for the city was $14,980. About 5.8% of families and 10.4% of the population were below the poverty line, including 10.1% of those under age 18 and 10.8% of those age 65 or over.

== Education ==
Public education in the city is administered by Paris R-II School District, which operates one elementary school, one middle school, and Paris High School.

Paris has a public library, a branch of the Little Dixie Regional Libraries.

== Notable people ==
- Armstead M. Alexander, U.S. congressman
- Robert N. Bodine, American lawyer and politician
- Thomas Curtright, professor of physics at the University of Miami
- Mary Margaret McBride, radio pioneer; born near Paris
- Ralph Shropshire, Professional baseball player

== See also ==
- List of cities in Missouri
