= Jefferson Township, Cole County, Missouri =

Inactive township in the US state of Missouri

Coordinates: 38.5722°N 92.2319°W

Jefferson Township is an inactive township in Cole County, in the U.S. state of Missouri.

Jefferson Township took its name from Jefferson City.
