= Jefferson Township, Clark County, Missouri =

Township in Clark County, Missouri, U.S.

Coordinates: 40.5264°N 91.7803°W

Jefferson Township is an inactive township in Clark County, in the U.S. state of Missouri.

It is named for U.S. President Thomas Jefferson.
