= Jefferson Township, Daviess County, Missouri =

Township in Daviess County, Missouri, U.S.

Jefferson Township
- Township
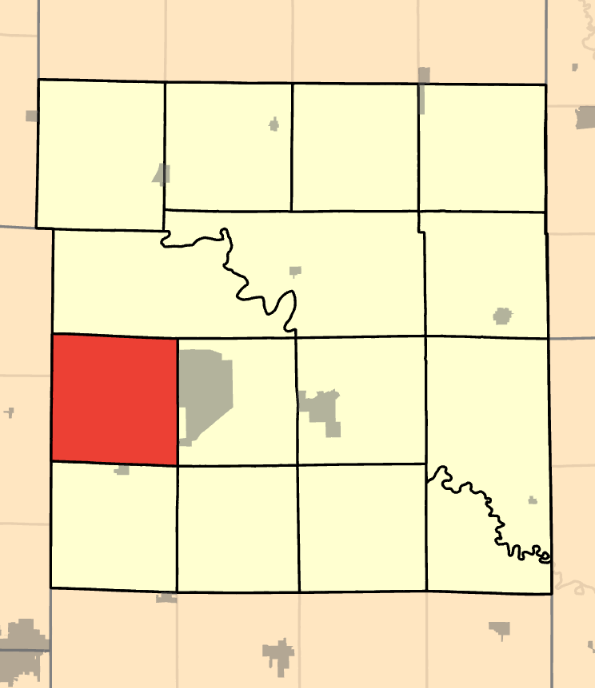
- Coordinates: 39°55′25″N 94°08′39″W
- Country: United States
- State: Missouri
- County: Daviess

Area
  - Total: 35.97 sq mi (93.2 km^{2})
  - Land: 35.7 sq mi (92 km^{2})
  - Water: 0.27 sq mi (0.70 km^{2}) 0.75%
- Elevation: 984 ft (300 m)

Population (2020)
  - Total: 472
  - Density: 13.2/sq mi (5.1/km^{2})
- FIPS code: 29-06136782
- GNIS feature ID: 766582

Jefferson Township is a township in Daviess County, Missouri, United States. At the 2020 census, its population was 472.

Jefferson Township was established in 1840, and named after President Thomas Jefferson.
