= Jefferson Township, Grundy County, Missouri =

Township in Grundy County, Missouri, U.S.

Coordinates: 39.99568°N 93.69269°W

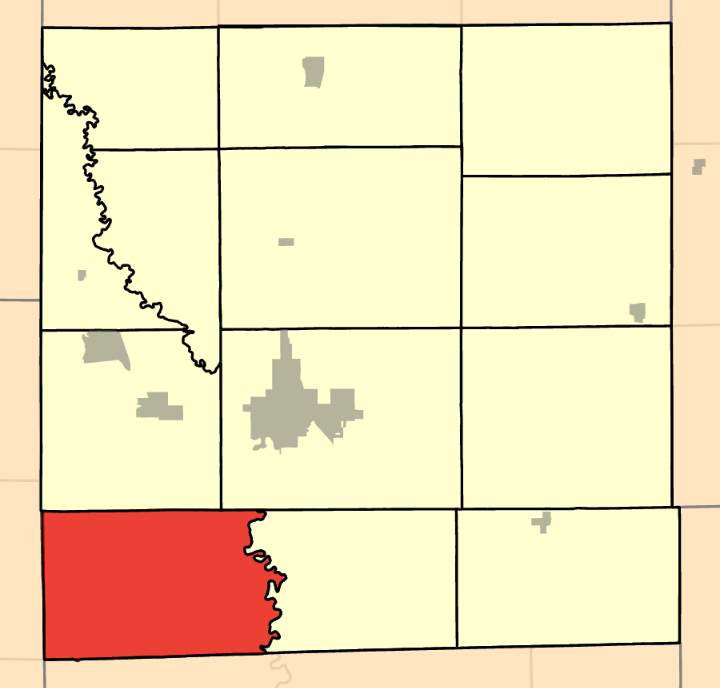

Jefferson Township is a township in Grundy County, in the U.S. state of Missouri.

Jefferson Township was established in 1841, most likely taking its name from President Thomas Jefferson.
