= Jefferson Township, Cedar County, Missouri =

Inactive township in the US state of Missouri

Coordinates: 37.7169°N 93.6739°W

Jefferson Township is an inactive township in Cedar County, in the U.S. state of Missouri.

Jefferson Township was established in the 1840s, taking its name from Thomas Jefferson, third President of the United States.
