= Jefferson Township, Scotland County, Missouri =

Township in Scotland County, Missouri, U.S.

Coordinates: 40.4325°N 92.1644°W

Jefferson Township is an inactive township in Scotland County, in the U.S. state of Missouri.

Jefferson Township was erected in 1844, taking its name from President Thomas Jefferson.
