= Jefferson Township, Osage County, Missouri =

Township in Osage County, Missouri, U.S.

Coordinates: 38.35341°N 91.73136°W

Jefferson Township is an inactive township in Osage County, in the U.S. state of Missouri.

Jefferson Township was erected in 1841, taking its name from Thomas Jefferson, third President of the United States.
