= Jefferson Township, Shelby County, Missouri =

Township in Shelby County, Missouri, U.S.

Coordinates: 39.6706°N 92.2392°W

Jefferson Township is an inactive township in Shelby County, in the U.S. state of Missouri.

Jefferson Township was erected in the 1868, taking its name from President Thomas Jefferson.
