= Santa Fe, Missouri =

Unincorporated community in Missouri, U.S.

Coordinates: 39°22′08″N 91°49′09″W

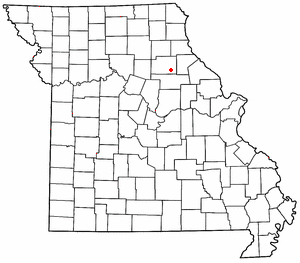

Santa Fe is an unincorporated community in southeastern Monroe County, Missouri, United States. It is located approximately twenty-five miles north of Mexico, near the southern edge of Mark Twain Lake.

Santa Fe was founded in 1836 and named for Santa Fe, New Mexico. The post office at Santa Fe has been in operation since 1854.

The Mark Twain State Park Picnic Shelter at Buzzard's Roost was listed on the National Register of Historic Places in 1985. The Clemens family (one of whom was Samuel Clemens, a.k.a. "Mark Twain") owned several tracts of land in the area.

== Civil War ==
A battle was fought on July 24, 1862, in Santa Fe during the American Civil War between the 3rd Iowa Volunteer Cavalry Regiment, under command of Colonel Henry Clay Caldwell, and the 1st Northeast Missouri Cavalry led by Colonel Joseph C. Porter. In A History of Northeast Missouri, Volume 1 the writer indicates this battle might have taken place on July 22, as by the 23rd Porter had already supposedly entered Callaway County.

== Demographics ==
Historical population
Census	Pop.	Note	%±
1920	118		—
1930	78		−33.9%
1940	116		48.7%
1950	83		−28.4%
Missouri Census Data Center
