= Jefferson Township, St. Louis County, Missouri =

Township in St. Louis County, Missouri, U.S.

Coordinates: 38°35′17″N 90°21′25″W

Jefferson Township is a township in St. Louis County, in the U.S. state of Missouri. Its population was 35,927 as of the 2010 census.
