= Jefferson Township, Monroe County, Missouri =

Township in Monroe County, Missouri, U.S.

Coordinates: 39.4903°N 91.8175°W

Jefferson Township is an inactive township in Monroe County, in the U.S. state of Missouri.

Jefferson Township was established in 1831, taking its name from President Thomas Jefferson.
