= Monroe City, Missouri =

City in Marion, Monroe, and Ralls counties in Missouri, United States

- City
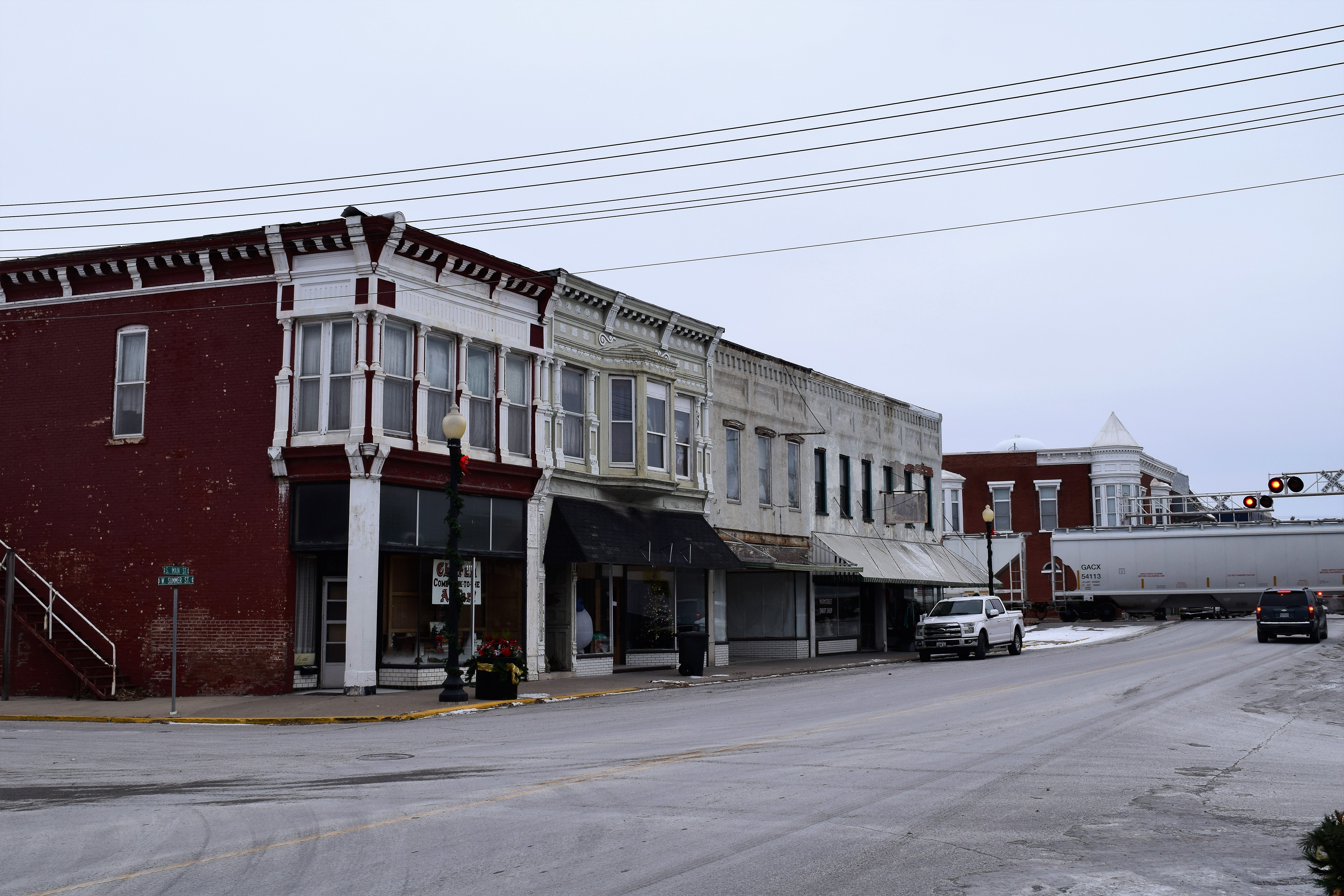
- Downtown Monroe City
- Nickname: Winners Lane
- Location in Monroe County and the state of Missouri
- Coordinates: 39°39′15″N 91°43′58″W
- Country: United States
- State: Missouri
- Counties: Monroe, Marion, Ralls

Government
  - Mayor: Ronald Miller

Area
  - Total: 3.06 sq mi (7.93 km^{2})
  - Land: 3.02 sq mi (7.82 km^{2})
  - Water: 0.042 sq mi (0.11 km^{2})
- Elevation: 738 ft (225 m)

Population (2020)
  - Total: 2,652
  - Density: 878.3/sq mi (339.12/km^{2})
- Time zone: UTC-6 (Central (CST))
  - Summer (DST): UTC-5 (CDT)
- ZIP code: 63456
- Area code: 573
- FIPS code: 29-49394
- GNIS feature ID: 2395376
- Website: www.monroecitymo.org

Monroe City is a city in Marion, Monroe, and Ralls counties in the U.S. state of Missouri. The population was 2,652 at the 2020 census.

The Marion and Ralls County portions of Monroe City are part of the Hannibal Micropolitan Statistical Area.

== History ==
Monroe City was platted in 1857, and named for its location within Monroe County. A post office called Monroe City has been in operation since 1860.

In 1907, Monroe City repealed its sundown town ordinance that it had set three weeks prior for Black people to return home by eight o'clock at night. During the time of the curfew, "Several, desiring to test the efficacy of the order, were severely beaten and chased to their homes."

The Farmers and Merchants Bank Building, St. Jude's Episcopal Church, and Washington School are listed on the National Register of Historic Places.

== Demographics ==
Historical population
Census	Pop.	Note	%±
1870	353		—
1880	640		81.3%
1890	1,830		185.9%
1900	1,929		5.4%
1910	1,949		1.0%
1920	1,941		−0.4%
1930	1,820		−6.2%
1940	1,978		8.7%
1950	2,093		5.8%
1960	2,337		11.7%
1970	2,456		5.1%
1980	2,557		4.1%
1990	2,701		5.6%
2000	2,588		−4.2%
2010	2,531		−2.2%
2020	2,652		4.8%
U.S. Decennial Census

=== 2020 census ===
As of the 2020 census, Monroe City had a population of 2,652. The median age was 38.3 years. 26.4% of residents were under the age of 18 and 19.2% of residents were 65 years of age or older. For every 100 females there were 94.9 males, and for every 100 females age 18 and over there were 90.8 males age 18 and over.

0.0% of residents lived in urban areas, while 100.0% lived in rural areas.

There were 1,083 households in Monroe City, of which 32.9% had children under the age of 18 living in them. Of all households, 42.4% were married-couple households, 21.1% were households with a male householder and no spouse or partner present, and 28.9% were households with a female householder and no spouse or partner present. About 32.9% of all households were made up of individuals and 14.2% had someone living alone who was 65 years of age or older.

There were 1,243 housing units, of which 12.9% were vacant. The homeowner vacancy rate was 4.0% and the rental vacancy rate was 11.0%.

Racial composition as of the 2020 census
Race	Number	Percent
White	2,262	85.3%
Black or African American	119	4.5%
American Indian and Alaska Native	11	0.4%
Asian	13	0.5%
Native Hawaiian and Other Pacific Islander	1	0.0%
Some other race	26	1.0%
Two or more races	220	8.3%
Hispanic or Latino (of any race)	76	2.9%

=== 2010 census ===
As of the census of 2010, there were 2,531 people, 1,036 households, and 623 families living in the city. The population density was 838.1 inhabitants per square mile (323.6/km^{2}). There were 1,189 housing units at an average density of 393.7 per square mile (152.0/km^{2}). The racial makeup of the city was 89.6% White, 7.3% African American, 0.4% Native American, 0.4% Asian, 0.2% from other races, and 2.1% from two or more races. Hispanic or Latino of any race were 1.5% of the population.

There were 1,036 households, of which 33.5% had children under the age of 18 living with them, 43.5% were married couples living together, 13.0% had a female householder with no husband present, 3.6% had a male householder with no wife present, and 39.9% were non-families. 36.1% of all households were made up of individuals, and 17.2% had someone living alone who was 65 years of age or older. The average household size was 2.35 and the average family size was 3.07.

The median age in the city was 37.9 years. 26.7% of residents were under the age of 18; 7.8% were between the ages of 18 and 24; 23.7% were from 25 to 44; 24.7% were from 45 to 64; and 17% were 65 years of age or older. The gender makeup of the city was 47.4% male and 52.6% female.

=== 2000 census ===
As of the census of 2000, there were 2,588 people, 1,061 households, and 661 families living in the city. The population density was 837.1 inhabitants per square mile (323.2/km^{2}). There were 1,182 housing units at an average density of 382.3 per square mile (147.6/km^{2}). The racial makeup of the city was 89.34% White, 8.85% African American, 0.04% Native American, 0.15% Pacific Islander, 0.35% from other races, and 1.28% from two or more races. Hispanic or Latino of any race were 0.43% of the population.

There were 1,061 households, out of which 31.6% had children under the age of 18 living with them, 47.1% were married couples living together, 11.7% had a female householder with no husband present, and 37.7% were non-families. 34.0% of all households were made up of individuals, and 15.8% had someone living alone who was 65 years of age or older. The average household size was 2.35 and the average family size was 3.04.

In the city, the population was spread out, with 26.3% under the age of 18, 7.7% from 18 to 24, 25.2% from 25 to 44, 21.9% from 45 to 64, and 19.0% who were 65 years of age or older. The median age was 38 years. For every 100 females, there were 84.9 males. For every 100 females age 18 and over, there were 80.5 males.

The median income for a household in the city was $30,377, and the median income for a family was $38,750. Males had a median income of $28,947 versus $20,114 for females. The per capita income for the city was $14,937. About 7.3% of families and 11.0% of the population were below the poverty line, including 10.4% of those under age 18 and 9.7% of those age 65 or over.

== Geography ==
Monroe City is in the northeast corner of Monroe County, with a small portion extending north into Marion County and a still smaller portion reaching east into Ralls County. U.S. Routes 24 and 36 split at Monroe City, with US 36 leading west-northwest 42 miles (68 km) to Macon and US 24 leading west-southwest 46 miles (74 km) to Moberly. The two highways together lead east 22 miles (35 km) to Hannibal on the Mississippi River. US 24 leads through the center of Monroe City as Main Street and 5th Street, while US 36 runs along the northern border of the city as part of the Chicago–Kansas City Expressway.

According to the U.S. Census Bureau, Monroe City has a total area of 3.06 square miles (7.93 km^{2}), of which 3.02 square miles (7.82 km^{2}) are land and 0.04 square miles (0.10 km^{2}), or 1.34%, are water. The city is drained to the north by the headwater tributaries of Sharpsburg Branch, a tributary of the South Fork of the North River, itself a direct tributary of the Mississippi.

Two remnants of the 8,000-year old prairie are within a 40-mile radius (64 km) of Monroe City.

=== Climate ===
According to the Köppen Climate Classification system, Monroe City has a humid subtropical climate, abbreviated "Cfa" on climate maps. The hottest temperature recorded in Monroe City was 108 °F (42.2 °C) on July 30, 1980, while the coldest temperature recorded was −28 °F (−33.3 °C) on February 13, 1905.

Climate data for Monroe City, Missouri, 1991–2020 normals, extremes 1901–present
Month	Jan	Feb	Mar	Apr	May	Jun	Jul	Aug	Sep	Oct	Nov	Dec	Year
Record high °F (°C)	74 (23)	81 (27)	89 (32)	92 (33)	94 (34)	103 (39)	108 (42)	106 (41)	102 (39)	94 (34)	81 (27)	74 (23)	108 (42)
Mean maximum °F (°C)	59.2 (15.1)	62.1 (16.7)	75.4 (24.1)	84.5 (29.2)	88.9 (31.6)	94.8 (34.9)	97.4 (36.3)	96.7 (35.9)	92.5 (33.6)	85.6 (29.8)	73.1 (22.8)	62.3 (16.8)	97.4 (36.3)
Mean daily maximum °F (°C)	36.0 (2.2)	39.9 (4.4)	52.0 (11.1)	63.9 (17.7)	73.1 (22.8)	82.5 (28.1)	86.2 (30.1)	85.0 (29.4)	78.9 (26.1)	66.7 (19.3)	52.7 (11.5)	40.7 (4.8)	63.1 (17.3)
Daily mean °F (°C)	26.8 (−2.9)	30.6 (−0.8)	41.8 (5.4)	52.9 (11.6)	63.4 (17.4)	72.7 (22.6)	76.2 (24.6)	74.3 (23.5)	66.9 (19.4)	55.4 (13.0)	42.5 (5.8)	32.0 (0.0)	53.0 (11.6)
Mean daily minimum °F (°C)	17.6 (−8.0)	21.2 (−6.0)	31.5 (−0.3)	41.9 (5.5)	53.6 (12.0)	62.8 (17.1)	66.2 (19.0)	63.6 (17.6)	54.8 (12.7)	44.0 (6.7)	32.2 (0.1)	23.2 (−4.9)	42.7 (6.0)
Mean minimum °F (°C)	−7.0 (−21.7)	−3.7 (−19.8)	12.8 (−10.7)	26.2 (−3.2)	38.1 (3.4)	49.7 (9.8)	55.0 (12.8)	51.7 (10.9)	40.3 (4.6)	27.9 (−2.3)	15.2 (−9.3)	1.1 (−17.2)	−11.0 (−23.9)
Record low °F (°C)	−21 (−29)	−28 (−33)	−10 (−23)	16 (−9)	27 (−3)	39 (4)	47 (8)	41 (5)	33 (1)	18 (−8)	−7 (−22)	−20 (−29)	−28 (−33)
Average precipitation inches (mm)	1.82 (46)	2.01 (51)	2.92 (74)	4.28 (109)	5.04 (128)	5.36 (136)	4.58 (116)	3.77 (96)	3.92 (100)	3.30 (84)	2.65 (67)	2.04 (52)	41.69 (1,059)
Average snowfall inches (cm)	5.4 (14)	5.5 (14)	4.3 (11)	0.7 (1.8)	0.0 (0.0)	0.0 (0.0)	0.0 (0.0)	0.0 (0.0)	0.0 (0.0)	0.0 (0.0)	1.4 (3.6)	3.9 (9.9)	21.2 (54.3)
Average extreme snow depth inches (cm)	2.9 (7.4)	3.0 (7.6)	1.6 (4.1)	0.4 (1.0)	0.0 (0.0)	0.0 (0.0)	0.0 (0.0)	0.0 (0.0)	0.0 (0.0)	0.0 (0.0)	0.6 (1.5)	1.7 (4.3)	4.2 (11)
Average precipitation days (≥ 0.01 in)	5.5	5.5	8.1	9.0	9.8	8.2	6.8	7.0	6.7	6.5	6.2	5.9	85.2
Average snowy days (≥ 0.1 in)	2.4	2.3	1.2	0.2	0.0	0.0	0.0	0.0	0.0	0.0	0.4	1.6	8.1
Source 1: NOAA
Source 2: National Weather Service (precip days, snow/snow days/snow depth 1901–2022)

== Education ==
Public education in Monroe City is administered by Monroe City R-I School District.

Monroe City has a lending library, the Monroe City Public Library.

Private education in Monroe City is administered by the Diocese of Jefferson City

== Notable people ==
- Helen Cornelius, country music singer-songwriter and actress
- Henderson Forsythe (1917–2006), actor
- Belle Johnson, photographer
- Kip Kendrick, former member of the Missouri House of Representatives
- Claude T. Smith, instrumental music composer and educator

== See also ==
- List of cities in Missouri
