= Mark Twain Lake =

Reservoir in Monroe and Ralls counties in Missouri, United States

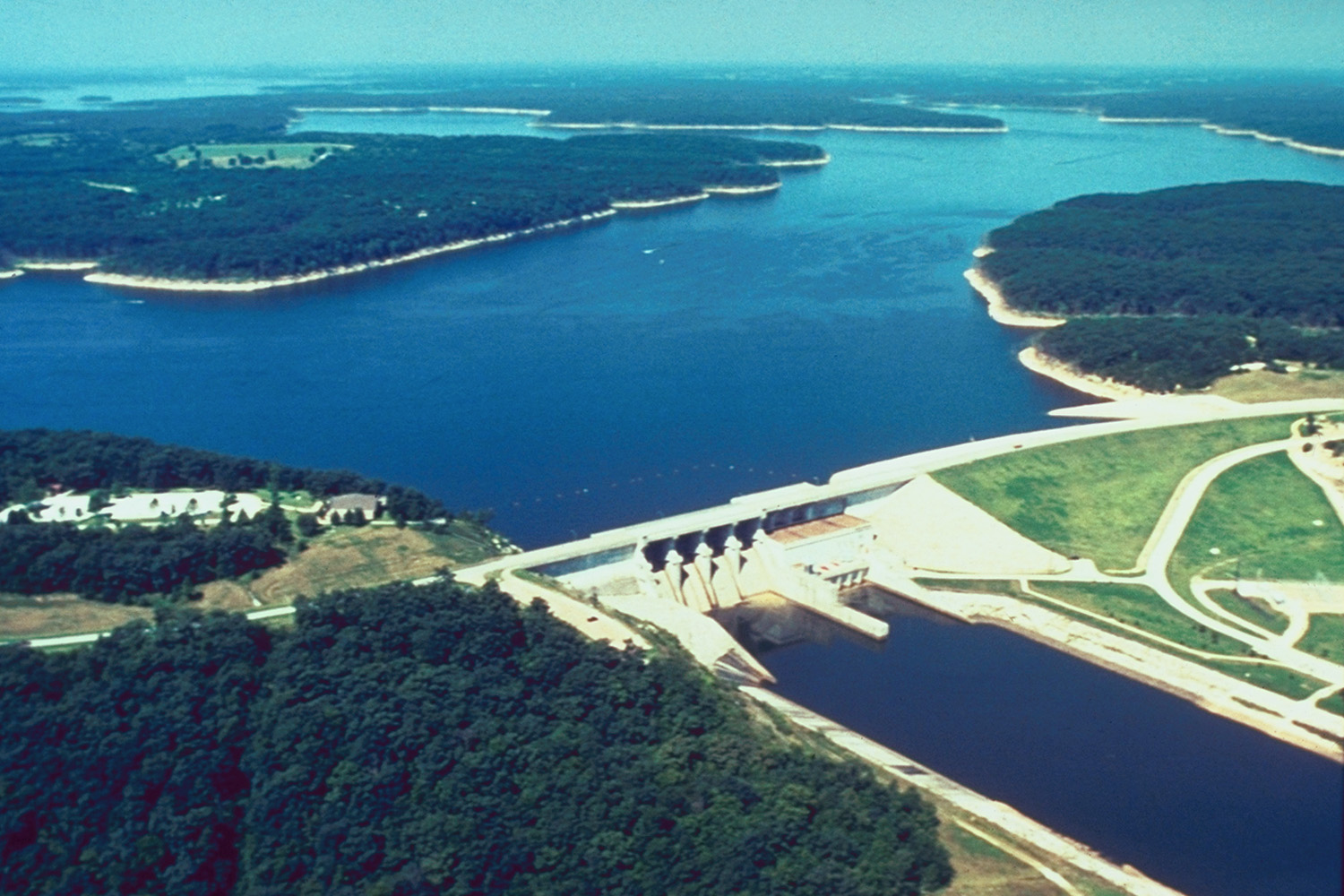
- Lake and Dam

- Location within Missouri Location within the United States
- Location: Monroe / Ralls counties, Missouri, United States
- Coordinates: 39°30′21″N 91°43′21″W
- Type: Reservoir
- Etymology: Mark Twain
- Primary inflows: Salt River
- Primary outflows: Salt River
- Basin countries: United States
- Managing agency: U.S. Army Corps of Engineers
- Max. length: 30 mi (48 km)
- Max. width: 1 mi (1.6 km)
- Surface area: 18,600 acres (7,500 ha)
- Average depth: 29 ft (8.8 m)
- Max. depth: 85 ft (26 m)
- Water volume: 457,000 acre⋅ft (564,000,000 m^{3})
- Shore length^{1}: 285 mi (459 km)
- Surface elevation: 606 ft (185 m)
- Settlements: Florida
- ^{1} Shore length is not a well-defined measure.

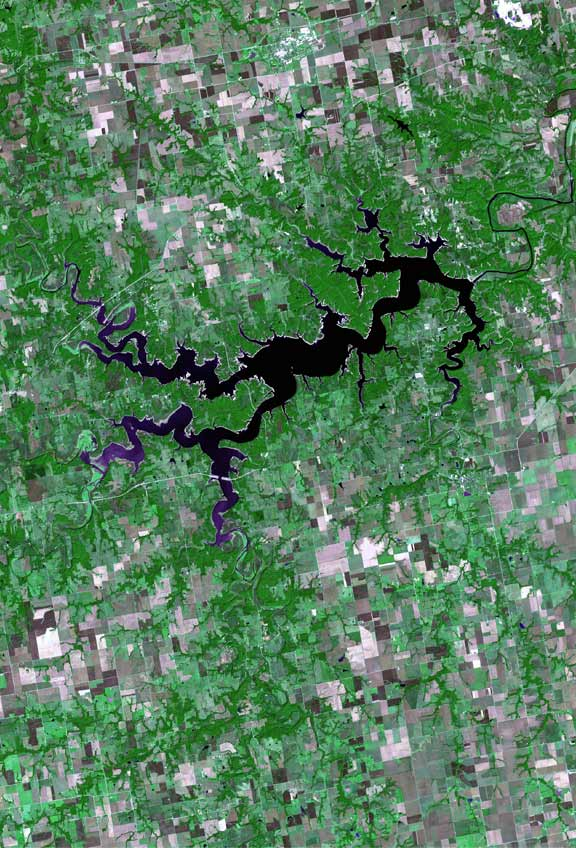
Satellite photography of Mark Twain Lake

Mark Twain Lake is a reservoir located in Ralls and Monroe counties in Missouri, United States. It was created by the Clarence Cannon Dam (formerly called Joanna Dam) impounding the Salt River and is located about 20 miles (32 km) southwest of Hannibal. The lake was named for Missouri author Mark Twain and part of the area around it is Mark Twain State Park. The village of Florida, the birthplace of Mark Twain, is mostly surrounded by the lake.

== Authorization and purpose ==
In 1937 the Joanna Dam project was first proposed as an answer to many years of flooding by the Salt River. With support and expertise of many, including Representative Clarence Cannon, the multi-purpose project was authorized by Congress in the Flood Control Act of October 1962. The dam and the lake offer multiple benefits to Northeast Missouri including: hydroelectricity, flood control, recreation, fish and wildlife conservation, water supply (shortage of existing ground water), navigation. The dam was dedicated in 1984. Johnny Cash played at the dedication ceremony.

== Clarence Cannon Dam and power house ==
Clarence Cannon Dam is a 138 feet (42 m) high and 1,940 feet (590 m) long combination concrete gravity section & compacted soils section embankment dam. The dam contains 450,000 cubic yards (340,000 m^{3}) of concrete and 3,000,000 cubic yards (2,300,000 m^{3}) of earth-fill.

The dam contains a hydroelectric power plant, with two generators, capable of producing up to 58 megawatts (78,000 hp) of power, or enough to supply a town of 20,000 people. When both units are operating at capacity, (ref 5) up to 12,000 cubic feet per second (cfs) , as much as 5,400,000 US gallons (20,000,000 L; 4,500,000 imp gal) of water pass through the turbines each minute. A re-regulation dam, located 9.5 miles (15.3 km) downstream from the main dam, creates a storage pool that could have been used for pumped-storage hydroelectricity. When demand for electricity is low, power from other sources can be used to pump water back from the tailwater to the lake. This water can then be re-cycled through the turbines when energy is in high demand.

== Namesakes ==
Clarence Cannon was one of the prime influences in the realization of the Cannon Dam Project during his 42 years serving in the U.S. House of Representatives. He was actively engaged in farming in Lincoln County throughout his life and the author of several publications on parliamentary law. Following his death in 1964, the Joanna Dam was officially renamed to honor the man who was a longtime supporter of the project.

The lake is named for author Samuel Clemens, (pen name of Mark Twain) who was born in Florida, Missouri. At the time of his birth, Florida sat on the bank of the Salt River which was later dammed to create the lake. Although he lived and wrote about many other places, he often delighted audiences and readers with colorful stories of his native Missouri.

== Recreation ==
Clarence Cannon Dam and Mark Twain Lake provide opportunities for outdoor recreation - boating, swimming, fishing, picnicking, hiking and hunting. There are recreation areas equipped with facilities such as campgrounds, beaches, and picnic shelters, as well as areas that are being managed for wildlife habitat. All visitors can enjoy the 54,000 acres (22,000 ha) of land and water at Clarence Cannon Dam and Mark Twain Lake.

Camping is available in three U.S. Army Corps of Engineers developed recreation areas, at the Mark Twain State Park and in several private recreation areas around the lake. Camping fees and facilities differ in the areas, however most have electric hookups, showers, restrooms, sanitary stations, fire grills, picnic tables and playground equipment. Group camping areas and a number of individual campsites are also available on a reservation basis. Campfire programs are held throughout the summer at outdoor amphitheaters in the campgrounds and give visitors the opportunity to learn more about the natural and cultural history of the area. School, scout and other interested groups may schedule programs upon request. The Corps also assists groups who sponsor bass tournaments, jamborees and other special events at the lake.

With over 18,000 acres (7,300 ha) of water, Mark Twain Lake is a suitable location for any type of water recreation. Boaters can use numerous boat ramps located conveniently around the lake as well as two full service marinas. Developed beaches on the lake provide swimming conditions. Anglers will find catfish, bass, crappie, walleye, bluegill and sunfish. Timber has been left in the upper ends of the lake and in selected coves to improve fish habitat.

Mark Twain Lake also provides recreational opportunities for picnickers, hikers, and hunters. Hikers and backpackers can use the many miles of trails throughout the lake area. Wildlife blinds, food plots and small ponds enhance a hiker's chance of spotting a deer, bluebird or other wildlife inhabitants of Missouri. For hunters, there are thousands of prime hunting grounds easily accessible from hunter/fisherman parking lots located throughout the area.

Near the lake, north of the village of Florida, are a group of prehistoric burial mounds; this site, known as the Crigler Mound Group, is listed on the National Register of Historic Places.

== See also ==
- List of dams and reservoirs in Missouri
