= Mark Twain State Park =

State park in Missouri, United States

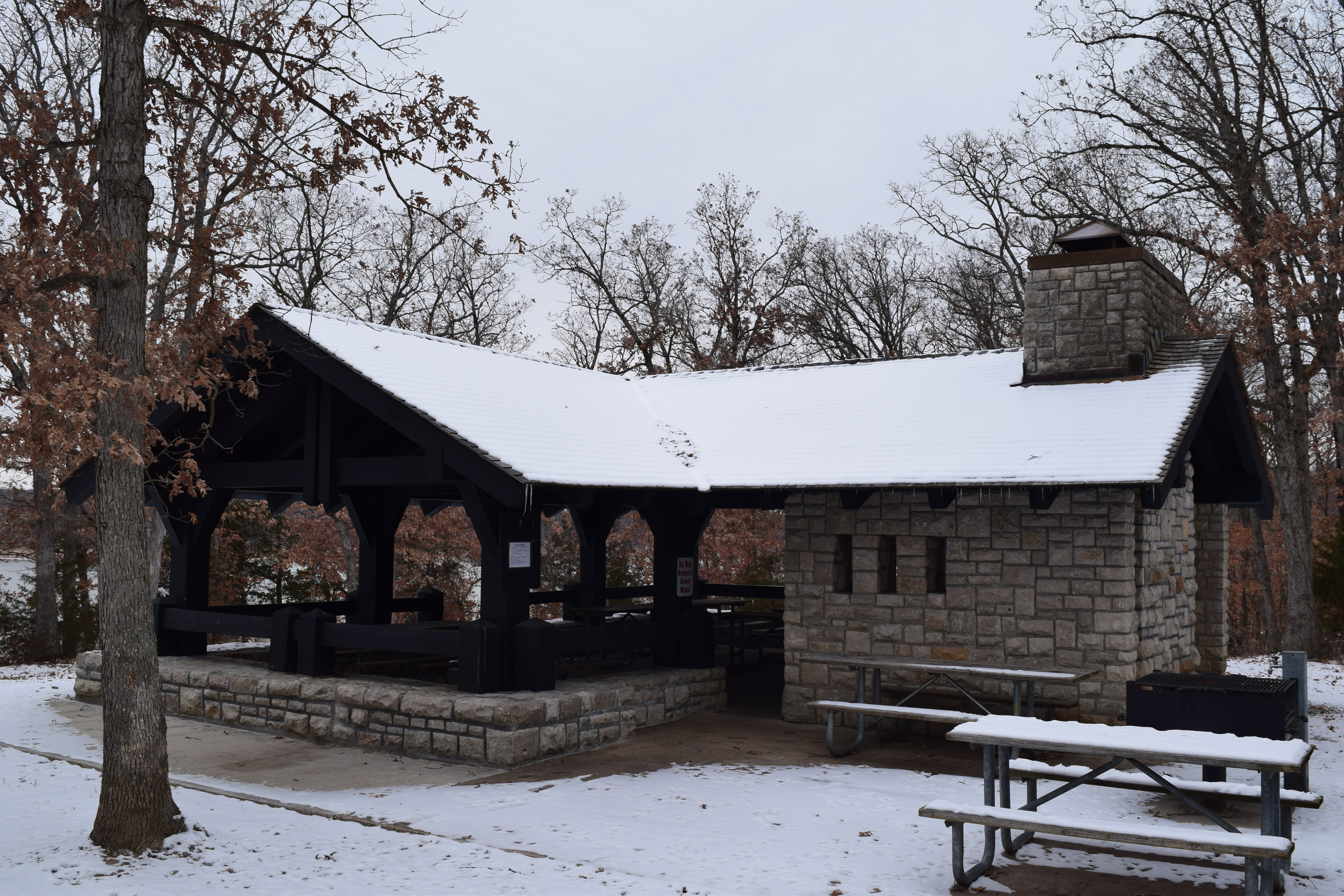
- Picnic shelter at Buzzard's Roost

- Location within Missouri Location within the United States
- Location: Monroe County, Missouri, United States
- Coordinates: 39°29′16″N 91°47′35″W
- Area: 2,788.14 acres (1,128.32 ha)
- Elevation: 663 ft (202 m)
- Established: 1924
- Administrator: Missouri Department of Natural Resources
- Visitors: 206,276 (in 2023)
- Website: Official website
- Mark Twain State Park Picnic Shelter at Buzzard's Roost
- U.S. National Register of Historic Places
- Nearest city: Santa Fe, Missouri
- Area: Less than one acre
- Built: 1941
- Built by: CCC
- MPS: ECW Architecture in Missouri State Parks 1933-1942 TR
- NRHP reference No.: 85000515
- Added to NRHP: March 4, 1985

Mark Twain State Park is a public recreation area encompassing 2,788 acres (1,128 ha) on Mark Twain Lake in Monroe County, Missouri. The state park offers water recreation, hiking trails, and campgrounds. It is adjacent to the Mark Twain Birthplace State Historic Site.

The Mark Twain State Park Picnic Shelter at Buzzard's Roost is a historic picnic shelter located at Mark Twain State Park. The shelter was built about 1941 by an all African-American Civilian Conservation Corps company. The shelter is constructed of stone in a rustic style. It was listed on the National Register of Historic Places in 1985.
