= U.S. Route 36 in Missouri =

Section of U.S. Highway in Missouri, United States

U.S. Route 36
- V.F.W. Memorial Highway
- US 36 highlighted in red, with business routes in green

Route information
- Maintained by MoDOT
- Length: 192.660 mi (310.056 km)

Major junctions
- West end: US-36 at the Kansas state line in St. Joseph
- I-229 / US 59 in St. Joseph; I-29 / US 71 in St. Joseph; I-35 / Route 110 (CKC) in Cameron; US 65 in Chillicothe; US 63 in Macon; US 24 in Monroe City; US 24 near Hannibal; US 61 (Avenue of the Saints) in Hannibal; I-72 in Hannibal
- East end: I-72 / US 36 / IL 110 (CKC) / Great River Road at the Illinois state line in Hannibal

Location
- Country: United States
- State: Missouri
- Counties: Buchanan, DeKalb, Caldwell, Livingston, Linn, Macon, Shelby, Ralls, Marion

Highway system
- United States Numbered Highway System; List; Special; Divided; Missouri State Highway System; Interstate; US; State; Supplemental
← I-35	→ Route 37

U.S. Route 36 (US 36) in the state of Missouri is an expressway with many freeway sections, connecting Kansas to Illinois. From Cameron to the Illinois state line, it forms part of the principal route between Kansas City and Chicago, known as the Chicago–Kansas City Expressway.

All of US 36 in Missouri is named the V.F.W. Memorial Highway.

== Route description ==
U.S. Route 36 in Missouri runs from the Pony Express Bridge over the Missouri River in St. Joseph to the Mark Twain Memorial Bridge over the Mississippi River in Hannibal. After leaving the Missouri River valley, U.S. 36 then links major cities in Northern Missouri with Kansas City and cities in the east. From Cameron to the Illinois state line, it is overlapped with Route 110, also known as the Chicago–Kansas City Expressway. Starting in St. Joseph, it passes through the cities of Cameron, Hamilton, Chillicothe, Macon, Shelbina, Monroe City, and Brookfield. The final 2 miles (3.2 km) of US 36 in Missouri is concurrent with I-72. The route passes through mostly flat, fertile, productive farmland. Even though there are some surface intersections, U.S. 36 has many grade-separated interchanges and town bypasses that suggest a future extension of I-72 west from Hannibal.

== History ==
US 36 across Missouri parallels the route of the Hannibal and St. Joseph Railroad, which was the reason St. Joseph was selected for the Pony Express. The two towns were the second and third largest cities in the State of Missouri prior to the American Civil War. Prior to the establishment of the railroad in the late 1850s, the stagecoach route was called the "Hound Dog Trail."

The road was originally Route 8 from 1922 to 1926, before being designated as US 36. Over the years some busier sections were widened to four lanes. On August 3, 2005, residents of Macon, Marion, Monroe, Shelby, and Ralls counties approved Proposition 36B, which excluded Ralls County from the Transportation Development District, and allowed for a 4-lane US 36 to be constructed without Ralls County's participation. On July 10, 2010, work was completed and the route ceremonially opened making US 36 a four-lane highway across the entire state, saving considerable travel time.

== Future ==
Presently, I-72 ends at US 61 (Avenue of the Saints) in Hannibal and was planned to extend westward to St. Joseph along US 36, but the proposal was shelved for years. In the interim, further lengthening was proposed by Marion County who published a five-item transportation list that was finalized by the County Commission on February 16, 2016, adding US 36, from the Mark Twain Memorial Bridge across the Mississippi River to the split of US 24 and US 36 near Rocket Plaza, as a new priority. Citing potential benefits including economic development and marketing of Hannibal Lakeside Industrial Park, the Commission advocate extending I-72 west approximately seven miles (11 km). In May 2023, the extension plans of I-72 to St. Joseph were renewed under the belief it would relieve traffic off of I-70. However, in July 2023, a bill to run a $2.5 million study was vetoed by Governor Mike Parson who said that it was not the right time to run the study.

== Major intersections ==
All exits are unnumbered.

County	Location	mi	km	Destinations	Notes
Missouri River		0.000	0.000	US-36 west / California National Historic Trail / Pony Express National Historic Trail – Elwood	Continuation into Kansas
Missouri River		0.000	0.000	Pony Express Bridges; Kansas–Missouri state line	
Buchanan	St. Joseph	0.195– 0.204	0.314– 0.328	Route 759 to I-229 / US 59 north / 4th Street – Central Business District, Stockyards	Interchange; 4th St. not signed eastbound; westbound signed as Route 759/4th St. only
Buchanan	St. Joseph	0.296– 0.489	0.476– 0.787	I-229 / US 59 – Kansas City, Central Business District	Interchange; no access to northbound I-229 from eastbound US 36 and no access to westbound US 36 from southbound I-229; exit 4B on I-229; western end of freeway section at traffic light for I-229 NB entrance ramp
Buchanan	St. Joseph	0.573– 0.670	0.922– 1.078	I-29 BL north (10th Street)	Westbound entrance includes direct entrance ramp from 8th Street
Buchanan	St. Joseph	1.440	2.317	22nd Street	
Buchanan	St. Joseph	1.956	3.148	28th Street	
Buchanan	St. Joseph	2.966– 3.456	4.773– 5.562	US 169 (Belt Highway)	
Buchanan	St. Joseph	3.580– 4.079	5.761– 6.565	I-29 / US 71 – Kansas City, Council Bluffs	Exits 46A-B on I-29
Buchanan	St. Joseph	5.059	8.142	Route AC (Riverside Road)	
Buchanan	St. Joseph	6.032	9.708	Ag Expo Way	
Buchanan	Marion Township	11.743	18.899	Route 31 south – Gower	Western end of Route 31 overlap
DeKalb	Washington Township	15.925	25.629	Route 31 north to Route 6 – King City	Eastern end of Route 31 overlap
DeKalb	Colfax Township	24.787	39.891	Route 33 south – Plattsburg	Western end of Route 33 overlap
DeKalb	Colfax Township	27.186	43.752	Route 33 north / Route M – Maysville, Lathrop	Eastern end of Route 33 overlap
DeKalb	Cameron	32.892	52.935	US 36 Bus. east (Grand Avenue)	
DeKalb	Cameron	33.693– 34.056	54.224– 54.808	US 69 / I-35 BL south / US 36 Bus. west (Walnut Street)	Western end of Loop 35 overlap
DeKalb	Cameron	34.538– 34.700	55.584– 55.844	I-35 / Route 110 (CKC) south / I-35 BL ends – Kansas City, Des Moines	Eastern end of Loop 35 overlap; western end of Route 110 overlap
Caldwell	Hamilton Township	44.460	71.551	US 36 Bus. east – Hamilton	
Caldwell	Hamilton	46.603	75.000	US 36 Bus. west / Route 13 – Gallatin, Kingston	Interchange
Livingston	Chillicothe	71.594– 71.852	115.219– 115.635	US 65 east / US 36 Bus. – Chillicothe, Carrollton	Interchange
Livingston	Chillicothe	72.459	116.611	US 36 Bus. west	
Linn	Parson Creek Township	85.054	136.881	Route 139 north / Route W south – Meadville	Western end of Route 139 overlap. Access to Fountain Grove Conservation Area
Linn	Jefferson Township	89.952	144.764	Route 130 south	Access to Pershing State Park
Linn	Laclede	91.830	147.786	Route 5 north / Route 139 south – Laclede, Linneus, Sumner	Eastern end of Route 139 overlap; western end of Route 5 overlap
Linn	Brookfield	95.515	153.716	US 36 Bus. east – Brookfield	
Linn	Brookfield	97.359	156.684	US 36 Bus. west / Route 11 – Brookfield, Mendon	
Linn	Marceline–Bucklin township line	104.265– 104.717	167.798– 168.526	Route U north / Route 5 south – Marceline	Interchange; eastern end of Route 5 overlap
Linn	Bucklin Township	107.000	172.200	Route 129 north – Bucklin	Western end of Route 129 overlap
Macon	Lingo Township	112.553	181.136	Route 129 south – Wien	Eastern end of Route 129 overlap
Macon	Lingo Township	114.575– 115.042	184.391– 185.142	Route 149 north / Route P south – New Cambria, Ethel	Interchange
Macon	Callao Township	121.166– 121.731	194.998– 195.907	Route 3 – Callao, Kaseyville	Interchange
Macon	Bevier Township	124.603– 124.993	200.529– 201.157	Route O north / Route C south – Bevier	Interchange
Macon	Hudson Township	127.873– 128.316	205.792– 206.505	Long Branch Lake Road	Interchange. Access to Long Branch State Park
Macon	Macon	130.053– 130.356	209.300– 209.788	US 63 – Kirksville, Moberly, Columbia	Interchange
Macon	Hudson Township	132.978	214.007	US 36 Bus. east – Macon	
Shelby	Clarence	141.119– 141.645	227.109– 227.956	US 36 Bus. east / Route 151 – Clarence	Interchange
Shelby	Clarence	142.403	229.175	US 36 Bus. west	
Shelby	Shelbina	152.972	246.185	US 36 Bus. east	
Shelby	Shelbina	153.710– 154.120	247.372– 248.032	Route 15 – Shelbina, Paris, Shelbyville	Interchange
Shelby	Shelbina	154.792	249.114	US 36 Bus. west	
Marion	Monroe City	170.138	273.811	US 36 Bus. east – Monroe City	
Ralls	Monroe City	171.969– 172.490	276.757– 277.596	US 24 west / US 36 Bus. west / Route Z – Monroe City	Interchange, western end of US 24 overlap; future western end of I-72. Access to Mark Twain State Park and Mark Twain Birthplace State Historic Site
Ralls	Saline Township			Route J – Perry	
Marion	Miller Township	184.089– 184.442	296.263– 296.831	US 24 east – Palmyra	Eastern end of US 24 overlap, west end of freeway section
Marion	Hannibal	187.716– 188.111	302.100– 302.735	Shinn Lane	
Marion	Hannibal	189.141– 189.557	304.393– 305.062	Veterans Road	
Marion	Hannibal	190.604– 190.955	306.747– 307.312	I-72 begins / US 61 (McMasters Avenue / Avenue of the Saints) / US 36 Bus. east / Great River Road – Palmyra, New London	Western end of I-72 overlap. Access to Hannibal-LaGrange University
Marion	Hannibal	191.573– 192.123	308.307– 309.192	US 36 Bus. west / Route 79 south / Great River Road – Louisiana, Downtown Hannibal	Exit 157 along I-72. Access to Mark Twain Historic District
Mississippi River		192.660	310.056	Mark Twain Memorial Bridge; Missouri–Illinois state line	
Mississippi River		192.660	310.056	I-72 east / US 36 east / IL 110 (CKC) north – Springfield, Chicago	Continuation into Illinois
1.000 mi = 1.609 km; 1.000 km = 0.621 mi: Concurrency terminus; Incomplete access

== Special routes ==
Number	Length (mi)	Length (km)	Southern or western terminus	Northern or eastern terminus	Formed	Removed	Notes
US 36 Bus.	1.6	2.6	US 36 near the Missouri River in St. Joseph	US 36 / US 59 Bus. / US 71 Bus. in St. Joseph	1959	1963	Served St. Joseph
US 36 Bus.	1.504	2.420	US 36 in western Cameron	US 36 / US 69 / Loop 35 in Cameron	1964	current	Serves Cameron
US 36 Bus.	2.807	4.517	US 36 in Hamilton Township	US 36 / Route 13 in Hamilton	1962	current	Serves Hamilton
US 36 Bus.	1.042	1.677	US 36 / US 65 in Chillicothe	US 36 in Chillicothe	—	—	Serves Chillicothe
US 36 Bus.	2.769	4.456	US 36 west of Brookfield	US 36 / Route 11 in Brookfield	1955	current	Serves Brookfield
US 36 Bus.	2.827	4.550	US 63 in Macon	US 36 east of Macon	1973	current	Serves Macon
US 36 Spur	1.0	1.6	US 36 west of Macon	Bourke Street in Macon	1956	1973	Former spur into Macon
US 36 Bus.	1.498	2.411	N. 1st Street in Clarence	US 36 east of Clarence	—	—	Serves Clarence
US 36 Bus.	1.772	2.852	US 36 west of Shelbina	US 36 in eastern Shelbina	1968	current	Serves Shelbina
US 36 Bus.	2.461	3.961	US 36 in western Monroe City	US 24 / US 36 / Route Z in northeastern Monroe City	1976	current	Serves Monroe City
US 36 City	1.88	3.03	—	—	—	1960	Served Hannibal from 1940s to 1960s
US 36 Bus.	3.6	5.8	US 36 / US 61 in Hannibal	I-72 / US 36 / Route 79 in Hannibal	1960	2013	Served Hannibal
Former

U.S. Route 36
Previous state: Kansas	Missouri	Next state: Illinois
