= Chicago–Kansas City Expressway =

Highway in Illinois and Missouri, U.S.

Chicago–Kansas City Expressway
- Route 110
- Chicago–Kansas City Expressway highlighted in red

Route information
- Maintained by MoDOT and IDOT
- Length: 527.6 mi (849.1 km) Missouri: 199.561 mi (321.162 km); Illinois: 328 mi (528 km)
- Existed: May 27, 2010–present
- Component highways: Route 110 in Missouri; IL 110 in Illinois

Major junctions
- West end: I-35 / I-435 in Claycomo, MO
- I-35 / US 36 in Cameron, MO; I-72 / US 36 / US 61 (Avenue of the Saints) in Hannibal, MO; I-72 / I-172 / US 36 in Hull, IL; I-172 / US 24 / IL 336 in Quincy, IL; I-74 / US 34 in Galesburg, IL; I-74 / I-80 / I-280 in Colona, IL; I-80 / I-88 / IL 5 / IL 92 in East Moline, IL; I-39 / US 51 in Rochelle, IL; I-355 Toll in Downers Grove, IL; I-88 Toll / I-290 / I-294 Toll in Hillside, IL
- East end: I-90 / I-94 / I-290 in Chicago, IL

Location
- Country: United States
- Counties: MO: Clay, Clinton, DeKalb, Caldwell, Livingston, Linn, Macon, Shelby, Marion, Ralls; IL: Pike, Adams, Hancock, McDonough, Warren, Knox, Henry, Rock Island, Whiteside, Lee, Ogle, DeKalb, Kane, DuPage, Cook

Highway system
- Missouri State Highway System; Interstate; US; State; Supplemental
- Illinois State Highway System; Interstate; US; State; Tollways; Scenic
← Route 109	MO	→ Route 110
← IL 109	IL	→ IL 111

The Chicago–Kansas City Expressway is a highway that runs between Chicago, Illinois, and Kansas City, Missouri. The road is known as Route 110 in Missouri and Illinois Route 110 (IL 110) in Illinois. IL 110 was created through legislation on May 27, 2010, as the designated route for the Illinois portion of the Chicago–Kansas City Expressway.

== Route description ==
=== Missouri ===
The Expressway starts in downtown Claycomo on I-35 and leaves the city in a northeast direction. In Cameron, the route turns east on US 36 and crosses the state via Chillicothe and Macon. East of Hannibal, the route continues east on I-72 through Hannibal and across the Mississippi River.

US 36 and I-35 in Missouri has the same comprehensive sign package similar to Illinois along the Chicago–Kansas City Expressway, including the Route 110 designation and the "CKC" logo on every route marker between Hannibal and Kansas City.

=== Illinois ===
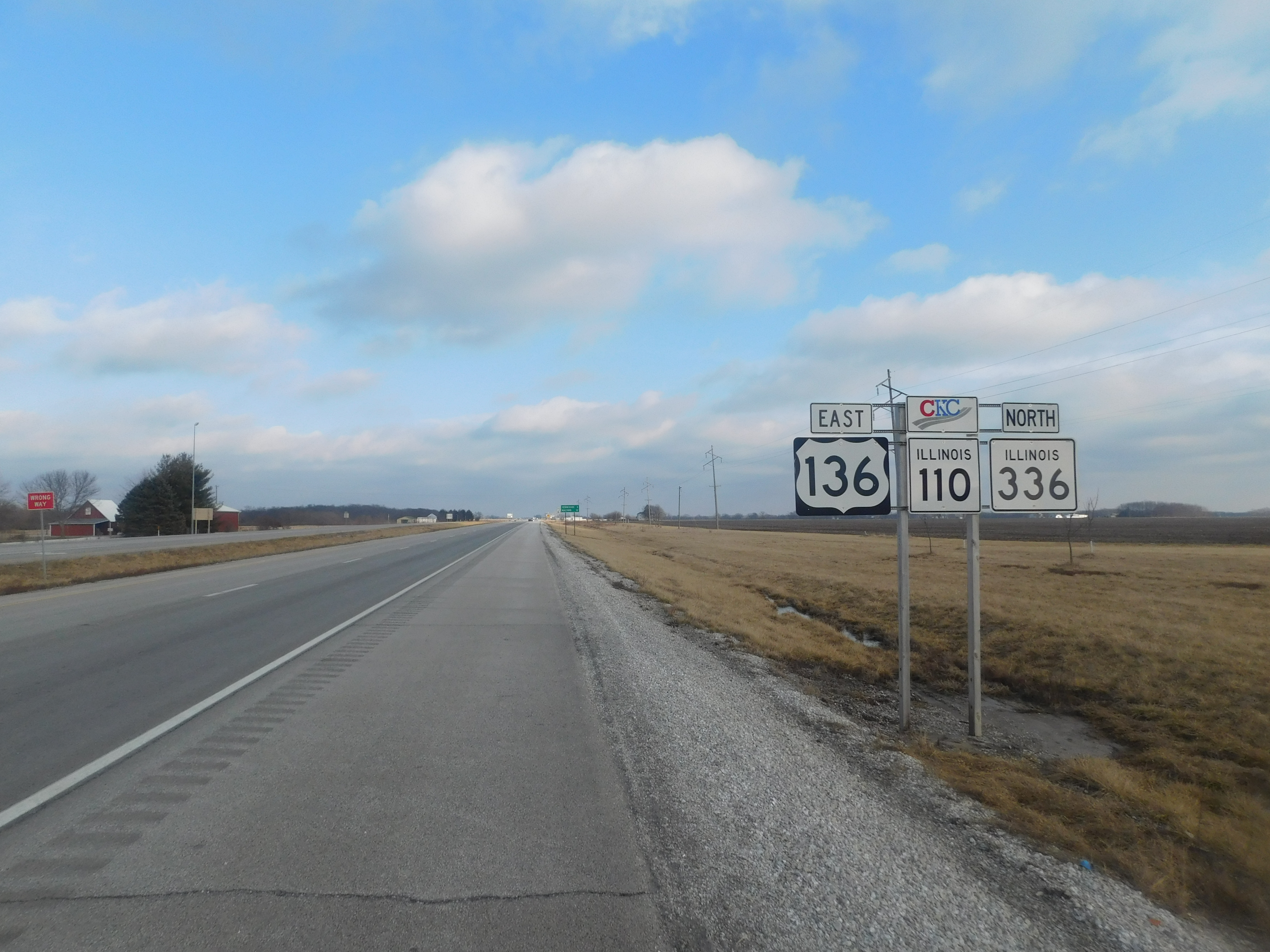
IL 110 heading east from IL 61 with US 136 and IL 336

IL 110 crosses into Illinois from the Mark Twain Memorial Bridge east of Hannibal. It follows Interstate 72 (I-72) east to I-172, then runs north with I-172 to IL 336 around the city of Quincy. Both routes run north to Carthage, where IL 110 and IL 336 join with US 136. All three routes run east to Macomb, where IL 110 then continues north with US 67 to Monmouth. There is a two-mile (3.2 km) stretch of the route in Good Hope, where it is reduced from a four-lane divided highway to a three-lane undivided street with a center turn lane.

At Monmouth, IL 110 joins US 34 and runs east to I-74. IL 110 then joins I-74 and runs north to near the Quad Cities, joining with I-80 before joining I-88 eastbound. The two highways continue east to I-88's eastern terminus in Hillside, where IL 110 continues on I-290, terminating at the Jane Byrne Interchange near the Chicago Loop.

== History ==
=== Cannon Ball Route ===
The Cannon Ball Route was a historic auto trail that ran from Hannibal, Missouri east-northeast to Chicago, Illinois. The route was included in the 1917 Map of Marked Routes provided by the Illinois State Highway Department, a precursor to the modern-day Illinois Department of Transportation.

This highway routing closely parallels the Hannibal-Quincy to Chicago branch of the Chicago, Burlington & Quincy Railroad. This route stayed west and north of the Illinois River, so this route never had to cross the limited number of Illinois River bridges in 1917.

=== Southern Illinois ===
IL 110 was the designation for what is present-day IL 15 from St. Libory, Illinois to just south of Addieville, where it meets up with IL 160. During the World War II years, IL 15 was part of what is now IL 160, and the section from St. Libory to Addieville was IL 110. The number was dropped in favor of US 460; the present IL 15 and IL 160 routings came in the mid-1960s.

Raven Road in Washington County is a stub of the former IL 15, and that intersection was the eastern terminus of IL 110.

=== Current route ===
Efforts to construct a direct route from Chicago to Kansas City have been in the planning stages since its exclusion from the Interstate Highway System in the 1950s. These efforts have been led by the Tri-State Development Summit, an economic development group for western Illinois, southeastern Iowa, and northern Missouri. The proposed highway took different forms over time: a 1989 study found that a full, limited-access tollway running from Kansas Turnpike at Kansas City to the Indiana Toll Road at Gary or Tri-State Tollway near the Joliet area would cost $2–$2.5 billion, if funded entirely by private investors.

In a joint resolution between the Illinois House and Senate in late May 2010, an expressway project connecting Chicago-to-Kansas City was named Illinois Route 110 (IL 110). The path, 532 miles (856 km) in total, follows parts of the existing IL 336, I-88, I-172, I-72, I-74, US 136, US 67 and connect the cities of Quincy, Macomb, Galesburg, a number of communities of the Chicago metropolitan area, including Chicago itself on I-290.

In 2010, signs were posted with the "CKC" banner above the IL 110 sign. The Illinois Department of Transportation erected 470 IL 110 (CKC) signs at a cost of $94,000.

== Future ==
Plans exist to extend I-72 westward from its current terminus in Hannibal to St. Joseph, Missouri along the existing US 36, but the proposal was shelved for years despite most of the route being a part of the Chicago–Kansas City Expressway. In May 2023, Missouri lawmakers approved a $2.5 million study on the conversion of US 36 into I-72, but in July 2023, the bill was vetoed by Governor Mike Parson, who said that it was not the right time to run the study. The extension of I-72 is seen as a way to relieve the pressure on I-70 as well as reduce truck traffic in St. Louis. The CKC routing would remain unchanged.

== Junction list ==
State	County	Location	mi	km	Exit	Destinations	Notes
Missouri	Clay	Claycomo	0.00	0.00		I-35 south / I-435 south – Kansas City, St. Louis	Western terminus of Route 110/CKC Expwy.; western end of I-35 overlap; exit 12A on I-35; exit 52B on I-435
Missouri	Clay	Pleasant Valley	1.2	1.9	13	US 69 south – Pleasant Valley, Liberty, Glenaire, Claycomo	Southern end of US 69 overlap; exit numbers follow I-35; signed as exit 14 southbound
Missouri	Clay	Liberty	3.4	5.5	16	Route 152 – Liberty, Kansas City International Airport	
Missouri	Clay	Liberty	4.9	7.9	17	Route 291 to I-435 – Liberty, Kansas City International Airport	
Missouri	Clay	Liberty	7.0	11.3	20	US 69 north / Route 33 – Excelsior Springs, Lawson	Northern end of US 69 overlap
Missouri	Clay	Kearney	13.3	21.4	26	Route 92 – Excelsior Springs, Kearney	
Missouri	Clinton	Holt	20.2	32.5	33	Route PP – Holt, Lawson	
Missouri	Clinton		27.1	43.6	40	Route 116 – Polo, Lathrop	
Missouri	Clinton		35.3	56.8	48	US 69 – Cameron, Lawson	
Missouri	Clinton	Cameron	39.8	64.1	52	I-35 BL north / Route BB – Cameron	
Missouri	DeKalb	Cameron	41.4	66.6	54	US 36 west / I-35 BL south / I-35 north – Cameron, Hamilton	Northern end of I-35 overlap; western end of US 36 overlap; exit 54 on I-35
Missouri	Caldwell	Hamilton Township	51.1	82.2		US 36 Bus. east – Hamilton	
Missouri	Caldwell	Hamilton	53.2	85.6		US 36 Bus. west / Route 13 – Gallatin, Kingston	Interchange
Missouri	Livingston	Chillicothe	78.3	126.0		US 65 east / US 36 Bus.	Interchange
Missouri	Livingston	Chillicothe	79.0	127.1		US 36 Bus. west	
Missouri	Linn	Parson Creek Township	91.6	147.4		Route 139 north – Meadville	Western end of Route 139 overlap
Missouri	Linn	Jefferson Township	96.5	155.3		Route 130 south	
Missouri	Linn	Laclede	98.4	158.4		Route 5 north / Route 139 south	Eastern end of Route 139 overlap; western end of Route 5 overlap
Missouri	Linn	Brookfield	102	164		US 36 Bus. east	
Missouri	Linn	Brookfield	104	167		US 36 Bus. west / Route 11	
Missouri	Linn	Marceline–Bucklin township line	111	179		Route 5 south / Route U – Keytesville	Interchange; eastern end of Route 5 overlap
Missouri	Linn	Bucklin Township	114	183		Route 129 north – Bucklin	Western end of Route 129 overlap
Missouri	Macon	Lingo Township	119	192		Route 129 south – Salisbury	Eastern end of Route 129 overlap
Missouri	Macon	Lingo Township	121	195		Route 149 north – New Cambria	Interchange
Missouri	Macon	Callao Township	128	206		Route 3 – Callao	Interchange
Missouri	Macon	Bevier Township	131	211		Route C / Route O – Bevier	Interchange
Missouri	Macon	Hudson Township	135	217		Long Branch Lake Road	Interchange
Missouri	Macon	Macon	137	220		US 63 – Kirksville, Macon	Interchange
Missouri	Macon	Hudson Township	139	224		US 36 Bus. east	
Missouri	Shelby	Clarence	148	238		US 36 Bus. east / Route 151 – Clarence	Interchange
Missouri	Shelby	Clarence	149	240		US 36 Bus. west	
Missouri	Shelby	Shelbina	159	256		US 36 Bus. east	
Missouri	Shelby	Shelbina	160	260		Route 15 – Shelbina, Paris, Shelbyville	Interchange
Missouri	Shelby	Shelbina	161	259		US 36 Bus. west	
Missouri	Marion	Monroe City	177	285		US 36 Bus. east	
Missouri	Ralls	Monroe City	179	288		US 24 west / US 36 Bus. west / Route Z	Interchange, western end of US 24 overlap
Missouri	Marion	Miller Township	190	310		US 24 east – Palmyra	Interchange, eastern end of US 24 overlap; western end of freeway section
Missouri	Marion	Hannibal	194	312		Shinn Lane	
Missouri	Marion	Hannibal	196	315		Veterans Road	
Missouri	Marion	Hannibal	197	317		I-72 begins / US 61 (Avenue of the Saints) / US 36 Bus. east / Great River Road – Palmyra, New London	Western end of I-72 overlap
Missouri	Marion	Hannibal	198	319	157	US 36 Bus. west / Route 79 south / Great River Road – Louisiana, Downtown Hannibal	Exit numbers follow I-72
Mississippi River			199.561 0.00	321.162 0.00	Mark Twain Memorial Bridge Route 110 (CKC) ends/ IL 110 (CKC) begins		
Illinois	Pike	Levee Township	1.2	1.9	1	IL 106 – Hull	
Illinois	Pike	Levee Township	4.3	6.9		I-172 begins / I-72 east / US 36 east – Springfield	Eastern end of I-72/US 36 overlap; southern end of I-172 overlap; exit 4 on I-72; exit 0 on I-172
Illinois	Adams	Fall Creek Township	7.5	12.1	2	IL 57 – Marblehead, Quincy	Exit numbers follow I-172
Illinois	Adams	Melrose Township	14.9	24.0	10	IL 96 (Payson Street, 36th Street) – Quincy	
Illinois	Adams	Quincy	18.8	30.3	14	IL 104 / Broadway – Quincy	Serves Quincy Airport
Illinois	Adams	Ellington Township	20.2	32.5	15	Columbus Road, Wismann Lane	
Illinois	Adams	Ellington Township	24.0	38.6	19	I-172 ends / IL 336 begins / US 24 to IL 96 – Mount Sterling, Keokuk	Northern end of I-172 overlap; southern end of IL 336 overlap; northern end of freeway section
Illinois	Adams	Mendon	30.6	49.2		IL 61 south – Mendon, Ursa	Interchange; southern end of IL 61 overlap
Illinois	Adams	Loraine	35.0	56.3		IL 61 north	Northern end of IL 61 overlap
Illinois	Hancock	West Point	45.4	73.1		IL 94 south (400 North) – West Point, Bowen	Southern end of IL 94 overlap
Illinois	Hancock	Tennessee	56.5	90.9		US 136 west / IL 94 north – Carthage, Keokuk, Macomb	Northern end of IL 94 overlap; southern end of US 136 overlap
Illinois	McDonough	Tennessee Township	68.7	110.6		IL 61 south	
Illinois	McDonough	Tennessee Township	70.5	113.5		US 136 east – Macomb	Northern end of US 136 overlap
Illinois	McDonough	Chalmers Township	78.7	126.7		US 136 – Colchester, Macomb	South end of freeway
Illinois	McDonough	Emmet–Macomb township line				IL 336 ends US 67 south	North end of freeway section; northern end of IL 336 overlap; southern end of US 67 overlap
Illinois	McDonough	Good Hope	88.5	142.4		IL 9	
Illinois	Warren		99.9	160.8		US 67 Bus. north	
Illinois	Warren	Roseville	101.4	163.2		IL 116	
Illinois	Warren		103.8	167.0		US 67 Bus. south	
Illinois	Warren	Kirkwood	112.9	181.7		US 34 west (Walter Payton Memorial Highway) – Burlington, Monmouth	Southern end of US 34 overlap
Illinois	Warren	Monmouth	114.3	183.9		IL 164 west (Broadway)	Southern end of IL 164 overlap
Illinois	Warren	Monmouth	115.8	186.4		US 67 north – Moline	Northern end of US 67 overlap
Illinois	Warren		118.0	189.9		IL 164 east	Northern end of IL 164 overlap
Illinois	Warren		122.8	197.6		Cameron Road	Interchange
Illinois	Knox	Galesburg	129.4	208.2		IL 41 south / IL 164 west (Main Street)	Interchange
Illinois	Knox	Galesburg	132.2	212.8		US 150 (Henderson Street) – Alpha	Cloverleaf interchange
Illinois	Knox	Galesburg	133.3	214.5		Seminary Street	Interchange
Illinois	Knox	Henderson	134.7	216.8		I-74 east (Everett McKinley Dirksen Memorial Highway) / US 34 east (Walter Payton Memorial Highway) – Wataga, Peoria	Northern end of US 34 overlap; southern end of I-74 overlap; exit 46 on I-74
Illinois	Henry	Woodhull	148.6	239.1	32	IL 17 – Woodhull, Alpha	Exit numbers follow I-74
Illinois	Henry	Lynn Township	156.6	252.0	24	IL 81 – Kewanee, Cambridge	
Illinois	Henry	Colona Township	166.7	268.3		I-80 east / I-74 / I-280 west – Chicago, Des Moines	Big X; northern end of I-74 overlap; southern end of I-80 overlap
Illinois	Henry	Colona	167.7	269.9	9	US 6	Exit numbers follow I-80
Illinois	Henry	Colona	169.8	273.3	7	Colona	
Illinois	Rock River				Bridge		
Illinois	Rock Island	East Moline	173.3	278.9	1B	I-80 west – Des Moines I-88 / IL 92 west to IL 5 west – Moline, Rock Island	Exit numbers follow I-88; exit number is for I-80 west, no exit number northbound; northern end of I-80 overlap; western end of I-88/IL 92 overlap; exit 4B on I-80; exit 1A on I-88
Illinois	Rock Island	East Moline	174.0	280.0	2	Old IL 2	Former alignment of IL 2
Illinois	Rock Island	Joslin	179.0	288.1	6	IL 92 east – Joslin	Eastern end of IL 92 overlap
Illinois	Rock Island	Hillsdale	183.5	295.3	10	Hillsdale, Port Byron	
Illinois	Whiteside	Erie	191.7	308.5	18	Erie, Albany	To IL 84
Illinois	Whiteside	Lyndon	199.0	320.3	26	IL 78 – Morrison, Prophetstown	Former IL 2
Illinois	Whiteside	Rock Falls	209.5	337.2	36	US 30 – Clinton, Rock Falls, Sterling	
Illinois	Whiteside	Rock Falls	214.4	345.0	41	IL 40 – Rock Falls, Sterling	
Illinois	Whiteside	Rock Falls	217.3	349.7	44	US 30 – Joliet, Rock Falls	
Illinois	Lee	Nelson			Western end of Ronald Reagan Memorial Tollway		
Illinois	Lee	Dixon	227.0	365.3	54	IL 26 – Dixon	
Illinois	Lee	Dixon	229.5	369.3	Dixon Toll Plaza		
Illinois	Ogle	Rochelle	249.2	401.0	76	IL 251 – Rochelle, Mendota	
Illinois	Ogle	Rochelle	251.6	404.9	78	I-39 / US 51 – Rockford, Bloomington, Normal	Signed as Exit 78A (south) and Exit 78B (north)
Illinois	DeKalb	DeKalb	259.3	417.3	DeKalb Toll Plaza		
Illinois	DeKalb	DeKalb	264.4	425.5	91	To IL 38 / IL 23 / Lincoln Highway / Annie Glidden Road – DeKalb	Westbound exit and eastbound entrance ramps pay toll
Illinois	DeKalb	DeKalb	266.2	428.4	DeKalb Oasis		
Illinois	DeKalb	DeKalb	267.0	429.7	94	To IL 38 / Lincoln Highway / Peace Road	Westbound exit and eastbound entrance ramps pay toll
Illinois	Kane	Sugar Grove	282.3	454.3	109	IL 47 – Sugar Grove, Elburn	Electronic tolling only on eastbound entrance and westbound exit ramps
Illinois	Kane	Aurora	286.4	460.9	113	IL 56 west to US 30 – Sugar Grove	Western end of IL 56 overlap; westbound exit and eastbound entrance
Illinois	Kane	North Aurora	287.4	462.5	114	CR 83 (Orchard Road) – Aurora, Batavia, North Aurora	Eastbound exit and westbound entrance ramps pay toll
Illinois	Kane	North Aurora	290.0	466.7	117	IL 31 / IL 56 east / Lincoln Highway (Lincolnway Street) – Aurora, Batavia, Geneva, North Aurora	Eastern end of IL 56 overlap; eastbound exit and westbound entrance ramps pay toll
Illinois	Kane	Aurora	290.8	468.0	Aurora Toll Plaza		
Illinois	Kane	Aurora	292.2	470.3	119	Farnsworth Avenue	Westbound exit and eastbound entrance ramps pay toll; Exit 119A-B on I-88 westbound
Illinois	DuPage	Aurora	294.2	473.5	121	To CR 14 (Eola Road) / Bilter Road	I-PASS only on westbound exit and eastbound entrance ramps
Illinois	DuPage	Naperville	296.2	476.7	123	IL 59 – Naperville, Plainfield, Warrenville, West Chicago	Diverging diamond interchange as of October 2015
Illinois	DuPage	Warrenville	298.1	479.7	125	CR 13 (Winfield Road) – Warrenville, Winfield, Naperville	Eastbound exit and westbound entrance ramps pay toll
Illinois	DuPage	Naperville	300.4	483.4	127	To CR 23 (Naperville Road) / Freedom Drive – Naperville, Wheaton	Eastbound exit and westbound entrance ramps pay toll
Illinois	DuPage	Lisle	303.0	487.6	130	IL 53 (Lincoln Avenue)	Westbound exit and eastbound entrance
Illinois	DuPage	Downers Grove	305.0	490.8	131	I-355 Toll (Veterans Memorial Tollway) – Joliet, Northwest Suburbs	Signed as exits 131A (south) and 131B (north) westbound; signed as exit 131 (south) and exit 132 (north) eastbound
Illinois	DuPage	Downers Grove	307.2	494.4	134	CR 9 (Highland Avenue) to IL 56 – Downers Grove, Lombard	Eastbound exit and westbound entrance ramps pay toll; westbound entrance via Downers Drive
Illinois	DuPage	Oak Brook	308.0	495.7	Meyers Road Toll Plaza (eastbound)		
Illinois	DuPage	Oak Brook	309.4	497.9	136	CR 15 (Midwest Road)	Eastbound exit and entrance only; entrance ramp pay toll
Illinois	DuPage	Oak Brook	310.1	499.1	137	IL 83 south (Kingery Highway) – Oak Brook, Hinsdale	No westbound entrance; eastbound entrance ramp pay toll
Illinois	DuPage	Oak Brook	310.7	500.0	138	To IL 83 north (Kingery Highway) / 22nd Street (Cermak Road)	Westbound entrance and exit only; toll on westbound entrance ramp
Illinois	DuPage	Oak Brook	311.1	500.7	York Road Toll Plaza (westbound)		
Illinois	DuPage	Oak Brook	311.6	501.5	—	I-294 Toll south (Tri-State Tollway) – Indiana	Eastbound exit and westbound entrance; exit includes direct exit ramp onto York Road
Illinois	Cook	Hillside	312.9	503.6	—	I-294 Toll north (Tri-State Tollway) / I-290 west – Milwaukee, Rockford	Eastbound exit and westbound entrance
Illinois	Cook	Hillside	313.2	504.0	—	I-294 Toll south (Tri-State Tollway) / IL 38 west (Roosevelt Road) – Indiana	Westbound exit and eastbound entrance
Illinois	Cook	Hillside	313.4	504.4	—	I-290 east (All trucks) to US 12 / US 20 / US 45 (Mannheim Road) – Chicago	Eastbound exit only
Illinois	Cook	Hillside	313.8	505.0		I-88 Toll ends / I-290 west – Rockford	Eastern end of I-88 overlap; western end of I-290 overlap; westbound exit and eastbound entrance; eastern end of Ronald Reagan Memorial Tollway.; exit 15A on I-290
Illinois	Cook	Hillside	314.2	505.7	16	Wolf Road	Exit numbers follow I-290; westbound exit only
Illinois	Cook	Hillside–Bellwood line	314.9	506.8	17	US 12 / US 20 / US 45 (Mannheim Road)	No eastbound exit
Illinois	Cook	Bellwood	315.9	508.4	18	25th Avenue	
Illinois	Cook	Maywood	316.4	509.2	19A	17th Avenue	
Illinois	Cook	Maywood	316.9	510.0	19B	9th Avenue	Westbound exit and eastbound entrance only
Illinois	Cook	Maywood	317.4	510.8	20	IL 171 (1st Avenue)	
Illinois	Cook	Forest Park	318.4	512.4	21A	Des Plaines Avenue	Westbound entrance and eastbound exit only
Illinois	Cook	Oak Park	319.0	513.4	21B	IL 43 (Harlem Avenue)	
Illinois	Cook	Oak Park	320.5	515.8	23A	Austin Boulevard (6000 W)	
Illinois	Cook	Chicago	321.0	516.6	23B	Central Avenue (5600 W)	
Illinois	Cook	Chicago	321.5	517.4	24A	Laramie Avenue (5200 W)	Westbound exit and eastbound entrance only
Illinois	Cook	Chicago	322.0	518.2	24B	IL 50 (Cicero Avenue)	Eastbound exit and westbound entrance only
Illinois	Cook	Chicago	322.6	519.2	25	Kostner Avenue (4400 W)	Westbound exit and eastbound entrance only
Illinois	Cook	Chicago	323.3	520.3	26A	Independence Boulevard (3800 W)	
Illinois	Cook	Chicago	323.8	521.1	26B	Homan Avenue	Westbound exit and eastbound entrance only
Illinois	Cook	Chicago	324.3	521.9	27A	Sacramento Boulevard (3000 W)	Eastbound exit and westbound entrance only
Illinois	Cook	Chicago	324.6	522.4	27B	California Avenue (2800 W)	Westbound exit and eastbound entrance only
Illinois	Cook	Chicago	325.1	523.2	27C	Oakley Boulevard (2300 W) / Western Avenue (2400 W)	
Illinois	Cook	Chicago	325.6	524.0	28A	Damen Avenue (2000 W)	To United Center
Illinois	Cook	Chicago	326.1	524.8	28B	Ashland Avenue (1600 W) / Paulina Street (1700 W)	
Illinois	Cook	Chicago	326.6	525.6	29A	Racine Avenue (1200 W)	Eastbound exit and westbound entrance only
Illinois	Cook	Chicago	326.9	526.1	29B	Morgan Street	Westbound exit only
Illinois	Cook	Chicago	326.9	526.1	29B	Taylor Street / Roosevelt Road	Eastbound exit only
Illinois	Cook	Chicago	328	528		I-90 east / I-94 east (Dan Ryan Expressway) – Indiana I-90 west / I-94 west (Kennedy Expressway) – Wisconsin I-290 ends	Jane Byrne Interchange; eastern terminus of IL 110/CKC Expwy.; eastern end of I-290 overlap
Illinois	Cook	Chicago	328	528		Ida B. Wells Drive	Continuation beyond I-90/I-94; formerly Congress Parkway
1.000 mi = 1.609 km; 1.000 km = 0.621 mi: Concurrency terminus; Electronic toll collection; Incomplete access; Route transition

== See also ==
- Peoria-to-Chicago Highway
- Forgottonia
