= Missouri Route 3 =

State highway in Missouri, U.S.

Route 3

Route information
- Maintained by MoDOT
- Length: 72 mi (116 km)

Major junctions
- North end: Route 11 south of Kirksville
- Route 156 near La Plata; US 36 / Route 110 in Callao; US 24 in Clifton Hill; Route 129 in Roanoke
- South end: Route 5 / Route 240 north of Fayette

Location
- Country: United States
- State: Missouri

Highway system
- Missouri State Highway System; Interstate; US; State; Supplemental
← Route 2	→ Route 4

Route 3 is a highway in northern and central Missouri. Its northern terminus is at Route 11 south of Kirksville; its southern terminus is at Route 5/Route 240 northwest of Fayette.

Route 3 was initially Route 67, designated in 1922 between Rocheport and Fayette. It was renumbered in 1926 due to US 67. In 1934/1935, the route extended north to US 36 in Callao. The next year, the original portion from Rocheport to Fayette became part of Route 240. In 1953/1954, the route extended north to Kirksville, its current terminus.

== Route description ==
Route 3 starts to the north at an intersection with Missouri Route 11 to the south of Kirksville. It then continues south and then intersects with Missouri Route 156. It then continues west along Route 156 for a short while before heading south again. It then eventually reaches Callao, Missouri and has an interchange with U.S. Route 36 It then heads east and parallels US 36 like a frontage road very shortly before turning south again. It then enters Clifton Hill, Missouri and intersects U.S. Route 24. It then continues east on a concurrency with U.S. Route 24 before heading south again in an intersection to the west of Huntsville, Missouri. As it heads south, it intersects with Missouri Route 129 in the unincorporated community of Roanoke, Missouri. It continues to head south and passes through Armstrong, Missouri, before ending at its southern terminus at Missouri Route 240.

== History ==
A section of Route 3 from County Road 2130 and Sweet Spring Creek in Randolph County two miles south of US 24 was closed from March 2021 until August 2024 from oversaturated ground. The road had to be realigned.

== Major intersections ==
County	Location	mi	km	Destinations	Notes
Howard	Prairie Township	0.0	0.0	Route 5 / Route 240 – Fayette, Glasgow	
Howard	Prairie Township	2.4	3.9	Route JJ	
Howard	Armstrong	4.1	6.6	Route U	
Howard	Armstrong	4.6	7.4	Route V	
Randolph	Roanoke	7.7	12.4	Route B	
Randolph	Roanoke	8.0	12.9	Route 129 – Salisbury	
Randolph	Silver Creek Township	13.1	21.1	Route U	
Randolph	Silver Creek Township	13.2	21.2	Route BB	
Randolph	Salt Springs Township	17.1	27.5	US 24 – Moberly	Southern end of US 24 concurrency
Randolph	Clifton Hill	20.6	33.2	US 24 – Salisbury	Northern end of US 24 concurrency
Randolph	Thomas Hill	26.8	43.1	Route F – Darksville	
Randolph	Chariton Township	26.9	43.3	Route W	
Macon	Kaseyville	34.1	54.9	Route T – College Mound	
Macon	Callao	44.6	71.8	US 36 / Route 110 – Brookfield, Macon	Interchange
Macon	Valley Township	51.4	82.7	Route EE	
Macon	Valley Township	53.0	85.3	Route HH – Elmer	
Macon	Independence Township	57.7	92.9	Route J – Elmer	
Macon	Richland Township	64.2	103.3	Route 156 – South Gifford	Southern end of Route 156 concurrency
Macon	Richland Township	65.8	105.9	Route 156 – La Plata	Northern end of Route 156 concurrency
Adair	Benton Township	73.8	118.8	Route 11 – Kirksville	
1.000 mi = 1.609 km; 1.000 km = 0.621 mi: Concurrency terminus
