= Missouri Route 129 =

State highway in Missouri, U.S.

Route 129
- MO 129 highlighted in red

Route information
- Maintained by MoDOT
- Length: 115.300 mi (185.557 km)

Major junctions
- South end: Route 3 in Roanoke
- US 24 in Salisbury; US 36 / Route 110 (CKC) near Bucklin; US 136 near Unionville
- North end: CR T20 near Cincinnati, IA

Location
- Country: United States
- State: Missouri

Highway system
- Missouri State Highway System; Interstate; US; State; Supplemental
← Route 128	→ Route 130

Route 129 is a highway in northern and central Missouri. Its northern terminus is at the Iowa state line where it continues as Appanoose County Road T20; its southern terminus is at Route 3 in Roanoke.

== Major intersections ==
County	Location	mi	km	Destinations	Notes
Randolph–Howard county line	Roanoke	0.000	0.000	Route 3 – Armstrong, Clifton Hill	
Howard	No major junctions				
Chariton	Salisbury	12.858	20.693	US 24 west – Keytesville	Southern end of US 24 overlap
Chariton	Salisbury	12.966	20.867	US 24 east – Clifton Hill	Northern end of US 24 overlap
Macon	Lingo Township	39.100	62.925	US 36 east / Route 110 (CKC) east – Macon	Southern end of US 36 / Route 110 overlap
Linn	Bucklin Township	44.652	71.860	US 36 west / Route 110 (CKC) west – Brookfield	Northern end of US 36 / Route 110 overlap
Linn	Baker Township	59.446	95.669	Route 11 south – Brookfield	Southern end of Route 11 overlap
Linn	North Salem Township	64.366	103.587	Route 11 north to US 63	Northern end of Route 11 overlap
Sullivan	Green City	83.438	134.280	Route 6 – Milan, Kirksville	
Putnam	Richland–Lincoln township line	103.377	166.369	US 136 east – Lancaster	Southern end of US 136 overlap
Putnam	Lincoln–Union township line	104.260	167.790	US 136 west – Unionville	Northern end of US 136 overlap
Putnam	Lincoln Township	115.300	185.557	CR T20 north – Cincinnati	Continuation into Iowa
1.000 mi = 1.609 km; 1.000 km = 0.621 mi: Concurrency terminus
