= Missouri Route 11 =

State highway in Missouri, U.S.

Route 11

Route information
- Maintained by MoDOT
- Length: 101 mi (163 km)

Major junctions
- South end: US 24 at Brunswick
- US 36 / Route 5 / Route 110 at Brookfield; US 63 / Route 6 at Kirksville
- North end: Route 15 / Route K at Baring

Location
- Country: United States
- State: Missouri

Highway system
- Missouri State Highway System; Interstate; US; State; Supplemental
← Route 10	→ Route 12

Route 11 is a highway in the northern part of the U.S. state of Missouri. Its northern terminus is at Route 15 near Baring; its southern terminus is at U.S. Route 24 west of Brunswick. The northern half of the route runs more east–west than north–south.

== Route description ==
Beginning at US 24 west of Brunswick, Route 11 travels north through Chariton County. Shortly after its starting point, the highway intersects Route M near Triplett and continues northward through rural farmland. Route 11 then passes through Mendon, where it intersects Route CC and Route C before continuing into Linn County.

In Linn County, Route 11 reaches Brookfield, where it intersects US 36, Route 5, and Route 110. The highway then continues northward, passing through St. Catharine and several small communities before entering Adair County. In Adair County, Route 11 intersects Route 149 near Novinger and continues eastward toward Kirksville.

Upon reaching Kirksville, Route 11 intersects US 63 and Route 6, forming a brief concurrency before separating again east of the city. The highway then enters Knox County, where it intersects Route 15 near Edina. Continuing northeast, Route 11 passes through Greensburg and Baring, where it reaches its northern terminus at the junction with Route 15 and Route K.

== History ==
The first highway named Route 11 in Missouri became a portion of US 69 in 1926. The current Route 11 was established in 1933 and completed in 1935. The highway was originally gravel and was mostly paved by the early 1950s and its easternmost portion was paved by 1956.

== Junction list ==
County	Location	mi	km	Destinations	Notes
Chariton	Brunswick	0.0	0.0	US 24 – Carrollton, Moberly	
Chariton	Triplett Township	4.7	7.6	Route M – Triplett	
Chariton	Triplett Township	6.4	10.3	Route M – Indian Grove	
Chariton	Mendon Township	8.4	13.5	Route BB – Whitham	
Chariton	Mendon	11.0	17.7	Route CC	
Chariton	Mendon	13.4	21.6	Route C	
Chariton	Yellow Creek Township	17.4	28.0	Route E	
Linn	Brookfield	26.3	42.3	US 36 / Route 5 / Route 110 – Chillicothe, New Cambria	Interchange
Linn	Saint Catharine	31.6	50.9	Route F	
Linn	Baker Township	43.6	70.2	Route C – Purdin	
Linn	Baker Township	45.1	72.6	Route PP	
Linn	Baker Township	47.1	75.8	Route HH	
Linn	New Boston	49.2	79.2	Route 129 – Bucklin	Southern end of Route 129 concurrency
Linn	North Salem Township	54.1	87.1	Route 129 – Winigan	Northern end of Route 129 concurrency
Adair	Walnut Township	59.8	96.2	Route Y	
Adair	Walnut Township	62.4	100.4	Route 149 – Goldsberry	Southern end of Route 149 concurrency
Adair	Walnut Township	64.3	103.5	Route 149 / Route CC – Novinger	Northern end of Route 149 concurrency
Adair	Walnut Township	66.7	107.3	Route K	
Adair	Pettis Township	70.3	113.1	Route N – Sugar Creek State Forest	
Adair	Benton Township	73.0	117.5	Route H	
Adair	Kirksville	73.2	117.8	Route 3 – Callao	
Adair	Kirksville	74.7	120.2	US 63 Bus.	Southern end of US 63 Bus. concurrency
Adair	Kirksville	76.2	122.6	US 63 Bus.	Northern end of US 63 Bus. concurrency
Adair	Kirksville	77.2	124.2	US 63 / Route 6 – Macon, Brashear	Southern end of US 63 / Route 6 concurrency
Adair	Kirksville	79.2	127.5	US 63 / Route 6 – Lancaster, Novinger	Northern end of US 63 / Route 6 concurrency
Adair	Clay Township	88.9	143.1	Route J – Brashear	Southern end of J concurrency
Adair	Clay Township	89.5	144.0	Route J – Willmathsville	Northern end of J concurrency
Knox	Greensburg Township	95.2	153.2	Route C / Route J – Greensburg, Hurdland	
Knox	Greensburg Township	96.6	155.5	Route P – Edina	
Knox	Baring	100.2	161.3	Route 15 / Route K – Memphis, Edina	
1.000 mi = 1.609 km; 1.000 km = 0.621 mi: Concurrency terminus
