= Russell Township =

Russell Township may refer to:

== Canada ==
- Russell, Ontario

== United States ==
- Russell Township, Lafayette County, Arkansas, in Lafayette County, Arkansas
- Russell Township, White County, Arkansas, in White County, Arkansas
- Russell Township, Lawrence County, Illinois
- Russell Township, Putnam County, Indiana
- Russell Township, Russell County, Kansas
- Russell Township, Camden County, Missouri
- Russell Township, Macon County, Missouri, in Macon County, Missouri
- Russell Township, LaMoure County, North Dakota, in LaMoure County, North Dakota
- Russell Township, Geauga County, Ohio
