= Missouri Route 156 =

State highway in Missouri, U.S.

Route 156
- MO 156 highlighted in red

Route information
- Maintained by MoDOT
- Length: 58.715 mi (94.493 km)
- Existed: 1951–present

Major junctions
- West end: Route 149 southwest of Kirksville
- US 63 in La Plata
- East end: Route 6 in Ewing

Location
- Country: United States
- State: Missouri

Highway system
- Missouri State Highway System; Interstate; US; State; Supplemental
← I-155	→ Route 157

Route 156 is a highway in northern Missouri. Its eastern terminus is at Route 6 in Ewing; its western terminus is at Route 149 in northwestern Macon County.

== Major intersections ==
County	Location	mi	km	Destinations	Notes
Macon	Drake Township	0.000	0.000	Route 149 to Route 11 – Ethel	
Macon	Richland Township	9.518	15.318	Route 3 south – Callao	Western end of Route 3 overlap
Macon	Richland Township	10.267	16.523	Route 3 north to Route 11	Eastern end of Route 3 overlap
Macon	La Plata	15.957	25.680	US 63 – Kirksville, Macon	
Knox	Salt River–Bourbon township line	32.506	52.313	Route 151 south – Leonard	Western end of Route 151 overlap
Knox	Bourbon Township	32.590	52.449	Route 15 north – Edina Route 151 ends	Eastern end of Route 151 overlap; western end of Route 15 overlap
Knox	Bourbon Township	38.254	61.564	Route 15 south – Plevna	Eastern end of Route 15 overlap
Lewis	Ewing	58.715	94.493	Route 6 to US 61 – Tolona	
1.000 mi = 1.609 km; 1.000 km = 0.621 mi: Concurrency terminus
