= Ten Mile Creek (North Fork Salt River tributary) =

Stream in the U.S. state of Missouri

Ten Mile Creek is a stream in Macon and Shelby counties of Missouri. It is a tributary of the North Fork Salt River.

The headwaters of the stream are at 39°48′50″N 92°22′30″W and the confluence with the North Fork Salt River is at 39°47′12″N 92°10′49″W. The source area for the stream is in eastern Macon County east of Missouri Route K between Ten Mile and Redman. The stream flows east-southeast and is impounded in western Shelby County as Daniel Boone Lake north of Clarence on U.S. Route 36. The stream passes under Missouri Route 151 below the dam and continues to the east for about five miles to its confluence with the North Fork.

Ten Mile Creek was so named on account of its length, approximately ten miles (16 km).

== See also ==
- List of rivers of Missouri
