= Goldsberry =

Goldsberry may refer to:

- Goldsberry (surname)
- Goldsberry, Missouri, an unincorporated community in Macon County, Missouri, United States
- Goldsberry Township, Howell County, Missouri, an inactive township in Howell County, Missouri, United States

== See also ==
- Goldsberry Track, a sports venue in Athens, Ohio
- Goldberry, a character in The Lord of the Rings
