= Russell Township, Macon County, Missouri =

Township in Missouri, U.S.

Coordinates: 39.83°N 92.80°W

Russell Township is a rural area governed as a township in Macon County, Missouri, United States.

== Facts ==
- Area: 36.5 miles
- Elevation: 259 meters / 850 feet
- Population: 197 persons (as of year 2013)

=== Geography ===
Russell Township contains the unincorporated community of Hart, Macon County, Missouri.

Russell Township is bordered by:

- White Township, Macon County, Missouri to the north,
- Valley Township, Macon County, Missouri to the east,
- Lingo Township, Macon County, Missouri to the south, and
- Linn County, Missouri to the west.

== History ==
A map of Russell Township in 1897, published by Geo. A. Ogle & Co. in 1897, includes the now-defunct Evelyn Post Office and the village of Hart on the Santa Fe Railroad. The Evelyn post office operated from 1888 to 1916. At one point in time the community was expected to become a town, but is now unincorporated.
