= Gardner and Tinsley Filling Station =

- U.S. National Register of Historic Places
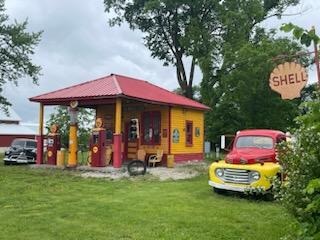

- Location within Missouri Location within the United States
- Nearest city: New Cambria, Missouri
- Coordinates: 39°45′35″N 92°43′13″W
- Area: Less than 1 acre (0.40 ha)
- NRHP reference No.: 02000408
- Added to NRHP: April 25, 2002

Moved by Scotty's Auction Service to 28251 North Highway 63 in Macon, Missouri about 2015. Gardner and Tinsley Filling Station, also known as the West's Gas Station, is a historic gas station located near New Cambria, Macon County, Missouri. It was built in 1931, and is a one-room, with one room addition, single story Bungaloid style gasoline station. This small, frame, hip-roofed rural gas station sits on an abandoned section of Old U.S. Route 36 and has a drive-under canopy.

It was listed on the National Register of Historic Places in 2002.
