= Milton A. Romjue =

American politician (1874–1968)

Milton Andrew Romjue
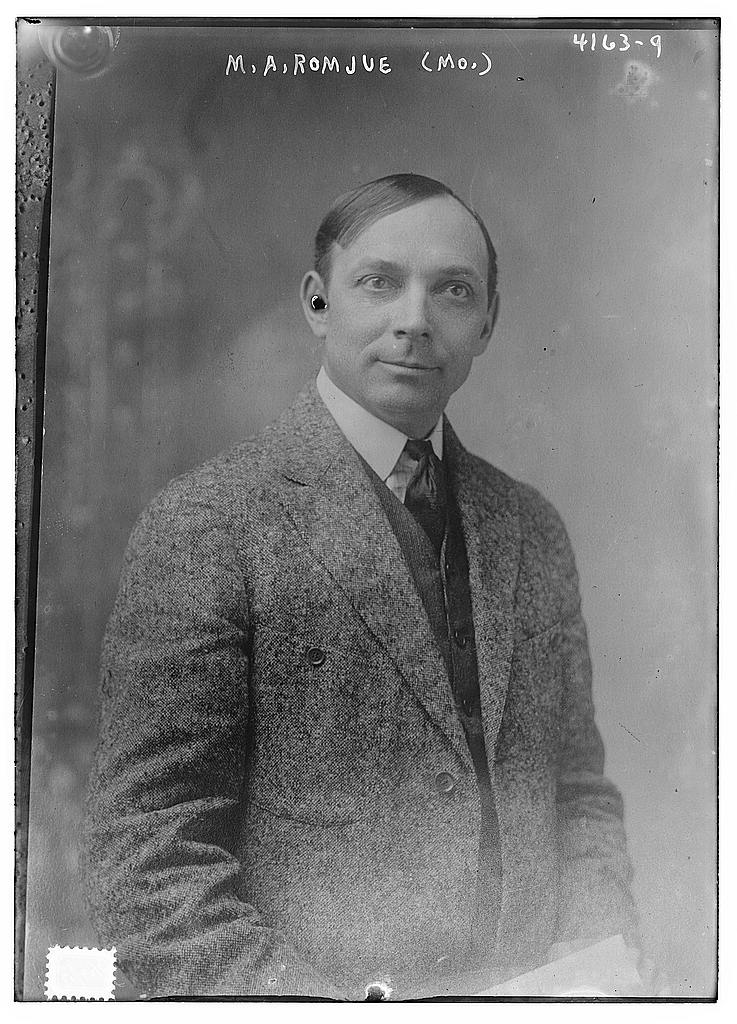
- Romjue circa 1917

Member of the U.S. House of Representatives from Missouri
- In office March 4, 1917 – March 3, 1921
- Preceded by: James Tilghman Lloyd
- Succeeded by: Frank C. Millspaugh
- Constituency: 1st district
- In office March 4, 1923 – January 3, 1943
- Preceded by: Frank C. Millspaugh
- Succeeded by: Samuel W. Arnold
- Constituency: 1st district (1923–33); At-large (1933–35); 1st district (1935–43)

Personal details
- Born: December 5, 1874 Macon County, Missouri
- Died: January 23, 1968 (aged 93) Macon, Missouri
- Party: Democratic
- Spouse: Mary Ann "Maude" Nickell (Thompson) Romjue (1880–1963)
- Children: 1
- Education: University of Missouri
- Occupation: Lawyer, career politician.

Milton Andrew Romjue (December 5, 1874 – January 23, 1968) was a U.S. representative from Missouri.

== Personal life and education ==
Congressman Romjue was born to Andrew Jackson Romjue (1840–1904) and Susan E. (Roan) Romjue (1843–1931) on December 5, 1874, near Love Lake, Macon County, Missouri. He attended Macon County rural schools and the Missouri State Normal School in Kirksville (now known as Truman State University) before being admitted to the University of Missouri, where he graduated from the law department in 1904. He married Maude Nickell Thompson on July 11, 1900. They had one child, a son, Lawson, born in 1907. Lawson followed in his father's footsteps to the University of Missouri to become an attorney and served in private practice for many decades.

== Career ==
Mr. Romjue was admitted to the Missouri bar in 1904 and immediately began a practice in Macon, Missouri. Early work included serving as city attorney for Higbee, Missouri, in 1904 and 1905, then judge of the Macon County probate court from 1907 to 1915. Active in Missouri politics since his college years, Romjue won his party's nomination, then the general election in 1916 as a Democrat to the Sixty-fifth and Sixty-sixth Congresses (March 4, 1917 – March 3, 1921). He was an unsuccessful candidate for reelection in 1920 to the Sixty-seventh Congress. Congressman Romjue returned to private practice for the next two years until being elected to the Sixty-eighth and to the nine succeeding Congresses (March 4, 1923 – January 3, 1943). Congressional career highlights include serving as chairman of the Committee on the Post Office and Post Roads (Seventy-sixth and Seventy-seventh Congresses) where he was able to help shape needed reforms and modernization to the U.S. Postal Service. While serving as a delegate to the 1928 Democratic National Convention, Congressman Romjue became friends with future President Franklin D. Roosevelt, and could always be counted on as a strong supporter of FDR's New Deal legislation in the 1930s—especially Social Security, help for farmers, and wounded military veterans. The congressman also worked closely with other Missouri politicians to secure for the state military bases like Fort Leonard Wood and Camp Crowder as America geared up for World War II.

Failing to win re-election in 1942 to the Seventy-eighth Congress, Romjue returned to Macon County where he resumed the practice of law and also engaged in farming and livestock production. Congressman Romjue died January 23, 1968, in Macon, Missouri, and was interred in that city's Oakwood Cemetery.

U.S. House of Representatives
Preceded by James Tilghman Lloyd	Member of the U.S. House of Representatives from Missouri's 1st congressional district March 4, 1917 – March 3, 1921	Succeeded by Frank C. Millspaugh
Preceded by Frank C. Millspaugh	Member of the U.S. House of Representatives from Missouri's 1st congressional district March 4, 1923 – March 3, 1933	District abolished
New district	Member of the U.S. House of Representatives from Missouri's at-large congressional district March 4, 1933 – January 3, 1935	District abolished
New district	Member of the U.S. House of Representatives from Missouri's 1st congressional district January 3, 1935 – January 3, 1943	Succeeded by Samuel W. Arnold
