= College Mound =

College Mound may refer to:

- College Mound, Missouri
- College Mound, Texas
