= South Gifford, Missouri =

- Village
- Location in Macon County and the state of Missouri
- Coordinates: 40°1′31″N 92°40′56″W
- Country: United States
- State: Missouri
- County: Macon

Area
  - Total: 0.20 sq mi (0.53 km^{2})
  - Land: 0.20 sq mi (0.53 km^{2})
  - Water: 0 sq mi (0.00 km^{2})

Population (2020)
  - Total: 22
  - Density: 107.6/sq mi (41.53/km^{2})
- Time zone: UTC-6 (Central (CST))
  - Summer (DST): UTC-5 (CDT)
- ZIP code: 63549 (La Plata)
- Area code: 660
- FIPS code: 29-68852

South Gifford is a village in Macon County, Missouri, United States. The population was 22 at the 2020 census, down from 50 in 2010.

== History ==
South Gifford had its start in the early 1900s when the railroad was extended to that point. A post office called South Gifford was established in 1913, and remained in operation until 1971.

== Geography ==
South Gifford is located in northern Macon County at 40°1′31″N 92°40′56″W (40.025177, -92.682154). Missouri Route 156 passes through the center of the village, leading east 10 miles (16 km) to La Plata and west 4 miles (6 km) to Route 149.

According to the U.S. Census Bureau, the village has a total area of 0.21 square miles (0.54 km^{2}), of which 0.001 square miles (0.6 acres), or 0.49%, are water. The Chariton River, a south-flowing tributary of the Missouri River, passes just west of the village.

== Demographics ==
Historical population
Census	Pop.	Note	%±
1910	148		—
1920	168		13.5%
1930	181		7.7%
1940	163		−9.9%
1950	128		−21.5%
1960	93		−27.3%
1970	64		−31.2%
1980	98		53.1%
1990	64		−34.7%
2000	72		12.5%
2010	50		−30.6%
2020	22		−56.0%
U.S. Decennial Census

=== 2010 census ===
As of the census of 2010, there were 50 people, 19 households, and 13 families living in the village. The population density was 238.1 inhabitants per square mile (91.9/km^{2}). There were 31 housing units at an average density of 147.6 per square mile (57.0/km^{2}). The racial makeup of the village was 98.0% White and 2.0% from two or more races.

There were 19 households, of which 31.6% had children under the age of 18 living with them, 63.2% were married couples living together, 5.3% had a female householder with no husband present, and 31.6% were non-families. 15.8% of all households were made up of individuals. The average household size was 2.63 and the average family size was 3.08.

The median age in the village was 39.5 years. 26% of residents were under the age of 18; 10% were between the ages of 18 and 24; 20% were from 25 to 44; 44% were from 45 to 64; and 0.0% were 65 years of age or older. The gender makeup of the village was 54.0% male and 46.0% female.

=== 2000 census ===
As of the census of 2000, there were 72 people, 24 households, and 19 families living in the village. The population density was 345.2 inhabitants per square mile (133.3/km^{2}). There were 31 housing units at an average density of 148.6 per square mile (57.4/km^{2}). The racial makeup of the village was 100.00% White.

There were 24 households, out of which 45.8% had children under the age of 18 living with them, 54.2% were married couples living together, 12.5% had a female householder with no husband present, and 20.8% were non-families. 16.7% of all households were made up of individuals, and none had someone living alone who was 65 years of age or older. The average household size was 3.00 and the average family size was 3.16.

In the village, the population was spread out, with 37.5% under the age of 18, 6.9% from 18 to 24, 40.3% from 25 to 44, 11.1% from 45 to 64, and 4.2% who were 65 years of age or older. The median age was 26 years. For every 100 females, there were 118.2 males. For every 100 females age 18 and over, there were 114.3 males.

The median income for a household in the village was $22,500, and the median income for a family was $17,917. Males had a median income of $15,833 versus $14,583 for females. The per capita income for the village was $9,225. There were 31.6% of families and 28.1% of the population living below the poverty line, including 28.6% of under eighteens and none of those over 64.
