= Mercyville, Missouri =

Unincorporated community in Missouri, U.S.

Coordinates: 39°58′18″N 92°38′36″W

Mercyville is an unincorporated community in Macon County, in the U.S. state of Missouri.

== History ==
Mercyville was laid out in the 1860s, and named after Mercy Williams, the wife of a local blacksmith. In 1888, the majority of the population removed to nearby Elmer after the railroad was extended to that point. A post office called Mercyville was established in 1867, and remained in operation until 1889.
