= New Boston, Missouri =

Unincorporated community in Missouri, U.S.

Coordinates: 39°57′07″N 92°51′35″W

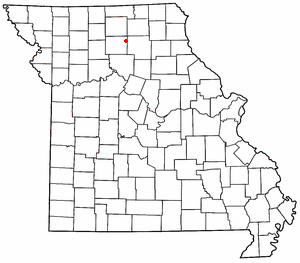

New Boston is an unincorporated community in eastern Linn County, Missouri, United States. It is located on Missouri Route 129 approximately sixteen miles (26 km) northeast of Brookfield. Mussel Fork flows past one mile (1.6 km) to the east in adjacent Macon County.

New Boston was laid out in 1846, and named after Boston, Massachusetts. A post office called New Boston has been in operation since 1872.
