= Morrow Township =

Morrow Township may refer to the following townships in the United States:

- Morrow Township, Washington County, Arkansas
- Morrow Township, Adair County, Missouri
- Morrow Township, Macon County, Missouri
