= Seney =

Seney may refer to:

== Places ==
In the United States:

- Seney, Iowa, an unincorporated community
- Seney Township, Michigan
- Seney, Michigan, an unincorporated community in Seney Township
- Seney, Missouri, an unincorporated community
- Seney National Wildlife Refuge, surrounding the community of Seney, MI
- Seney Stretch, a 25-mile straight route along M-28 between Seney and Shingleton, MI

== People ==
- Brett Seney (1996-) Canadian ice hockey player in the National Hockey League
- George E. Seney (1832–1905), American politician, lawyer and judge from Ohio
- Joshua Seney (1756–1798), American farmer, lawyer, and politician from Maryland
- Julia Rice Seney (1853-1915), American writer, newspaper editor, government administrator, and charity worker

== Other uses ==
- The Seney Syndicate, which linked together several short railroads in Ohio, Indiana, and Illinois to form the Lake Erie and Western Railroad
