= Missouri Route 149 =

State highway in Missouri, U.S.

Route 149
- MO 149 highlighted in red

Route information
- Maintained by MoDOT
- Length: 84 mi (135 km)

Major junctions
- South end: US 36 / Route 110 (CKC) / Route P south of New Cambria
- Route 6 in Novinger; US 136 near Livonia
- North end: CR T30 at the Iowa state line near Chariton

Location
- Country: United States
- State: Missouri

Highway system
- Missouri State Highway System; Interstate; US; State; Supplemental
← Route 148	→ Route 150

Route 149 is a highway in northern Missouri. Its northern terminus is at the Iowa state line where it continues as Appanoose County Route T30; its southern terminus is at U.S. Route 36 south of New Cambria.

== Major intersections ==
County	Location	mi	km	Destinations	Notes
Macon	New Cambria	0.000	0.000	US 36 / Route 110 (CKC) – Macon, Brookfield; Route P	Roadway continues at Route P
Macon	Drake Township	21.070	33.909	Route 156 east – La Plata	
Adair	Walnut Township	27.309	43.950	Route 11 south – New Boston	Southern end of Route 11 overlap
Adair	Walnut Township	29.184	46.967	Route 11 north to US 63 / Route CC	Northern end of Route 11 overlap
Adair	Morrow Township	41.528	66.833	Route 6 west – Greencastle	Southern end of Route 6 overlap
Adair	Novinger	47.593	76.594	Route 6 east – Kirksville	Northern end of Route 6 overlap
Putnam	Elm–Liberty township line	68.203	109.762	US 136 west / Route V – Unionville	Southern end of US 136 overlap
Putnam	Liberty Township	70.493	113.447	US 136 east – Livonia	Northern end of US 136 overlap
Putnam	Liberty Township	78.793	126.805	CR T30 north	Continuation into Iowa
1.000 mi = 1.609 km; 1.000 km = 0.621 mi
