= Johnston Township, Macon County, Missouri =

Township in Macon County, Missouri, U.S.

Coordinates: 39.99549°N 92.37183°W

Johnston Township is an inactive township in Macon County, in the U.S. state of Missouri.

Johnston Township was established in 1872, and named after Richard Johnston, a pioneer citizen.
