= Easley Township, Macon County, Missouri =

Township in Macon County, Missouri, U.S.

Coordinates: 39.99926°N 92.67892°W

Easley Township is an inactive township in Macon County, in the U.S. state of Missouri.

Easley Township has the name of William Easley, a local county judge.
