= Kern, Missouri =

Unincorporated community in Missouri, U.S.

Coordinates: 39°46′32″N 92°42′04″W

Kern is an unincorporated community in Macon County, in the U.S. state of Missouri.

The community has the name of Robert Kern, a St. Louis judge.
