= Chariton Township, Macon County, Missouri =

Inactive township in the US state of Missouri

Coordinates: 39.6522956°N 92.5693652°W

Chariton Township is an inactive township in Macon County, in the U.S. state of Missouri.

Chariton Township was named after the Chariton River.
