= Kellogg, Missouri =

Unincorporated community in Missouri, U.S.

Coordinates: 39°47′46″N 92°26′33″W

Kellogg is an unincorporated community in Macon County, in the U.S. state of Missouri.

== History ==
A post office called Kellogg was established in 1894, and remained in operation until 1903. R. Kellogg, an early postmaster, gave the community his last name.
