= Lingo, Missouri =

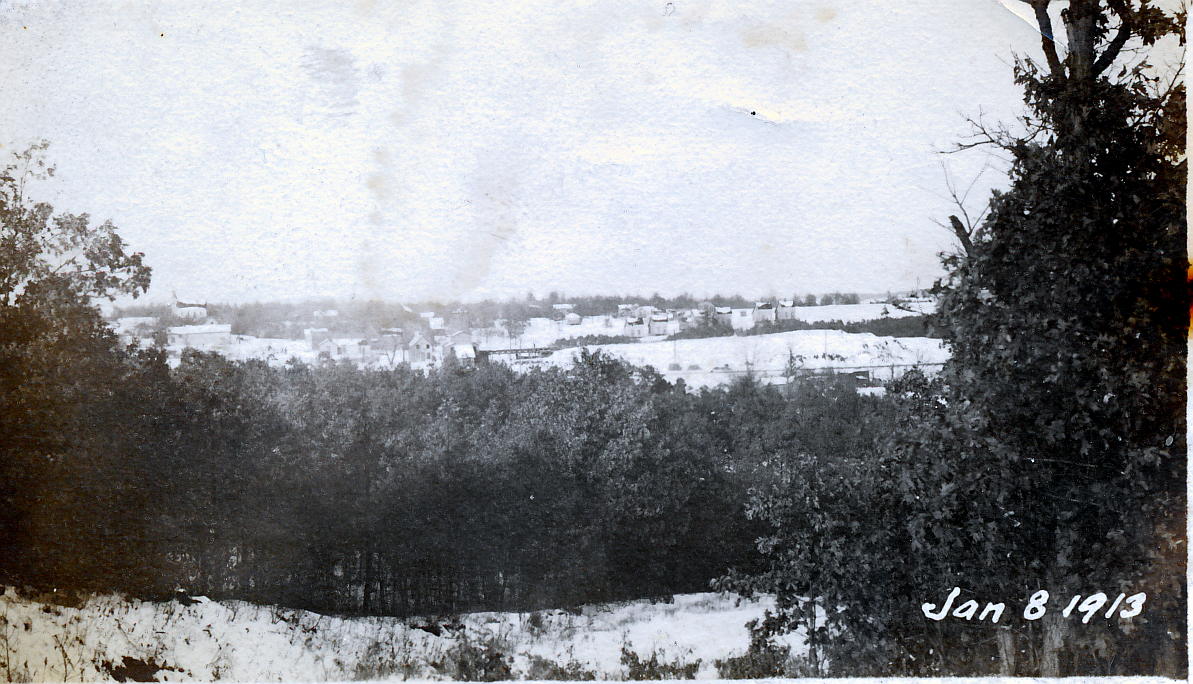
- View of Lingo from the east side, January 8, 1913.

- Location of Lingo, Missouri in the United States Lingo (the United States)
- Coordinates: 39°46′05″N 92°49′14″W
- Country: United States
- State: Missouri
- County: Macon

Lingo is a community in Macon County, Missouri, 20 miles (32 km) west of the city of Macon. Lingo was platted in 1873. The village was named for an early settler, Samuel Sanders Lingo, who was born August 9, 1805, in South Carolina, and was a prominent figure as county judge in Macon County for 25 years.

Located north of U.S. Route 36 on County Road W, between Brush Creek and the Mussel Fork of the Chariton River, Lingo was originally known as "Peabody's Woodyard", for a Colonel Peabody who stacked wood there for sale to the railroad. The community's historical association with coal mining began in 1873, after the discovery of low-grade coal in the local area. Two brothers who were employees of the Hannibal and St. Joseph Railroad, George and Thomas Jobson, started the first coal mining operation. Miners from Bohemia in Europe were hired to mine the coal, as they were accustomed to this type of mining. This brought the population of the town to between approximately 1,500 and 2,000 at one time.

In 1892, the town was sold to Armour and Company, a meat processing company. During the course of this ownership, a strike was started in the company. All the houses in the town were painted yellow to show the support of the strike. As coal was no longer a main source of power due to people going more to oil burning engines, the mine was closed. Many of the houses were moved to other towns with their owners. The depot was moved by the railroad to another town.

In 1973, the town celebrated its 100th anniversary. A weekend of gatherings were held, and the news of it even made it to the Kansas City papers. Today, remains of the mine can still be seen when crossing the tracks. There are only about 15 to 20 people remaining, but many of the mailboxes still tell of the Bohemian ancestry. Out of the twenty or so streets that were in the 19th century, only two of the original remain (Main and Lewis).
