= Barnesville, Macon County, Missouri =

Unincorporated community in Missouri, U.S.

Coordinates: 39°53′58″N 92°35′24″W

Barnesville is an unincorporated community in Macon County, in the U.S. state of Missouri.

== History ==
A post office called Barnesville was established in 1878, and remained in operation until 1904.
