= Round Grove Township, Macon County, Missouri =

Township in Macon County, Missouri, U.S.

Coordinates: 39.74°N 92.36°W

Round Grove Township is an inactive township in Macon County, in the U.S. state of Missouri.

Round Grove Township was established in 1872.
