= Economy, Missouri =

Unincorporated community in Macon County, Missouri

Coordinates: 39°53′21″N 92°25′15″W

Economy is an unincorporated community in Macon County, in the U.S. state of Missouri.

== History ==
Economy was originally called Vienna, and under the latter name settlement was made in the 1830s. The present name recalls the economical deals to be had at a local store. A post office called Vienna was established in 1854, the name was changed to Economy in 1856, and the post office closed in 1906.
