= Cardy, Missouri =

- Unincorporated community
- Location within Missouri Location within the United States
- Coordinates: 40°00′06″N 92°35′44″W
- Country: United States
- State: Missouri
- County: Macon
- Elevation: 945 ft (288 m)
- Time zone: UTC-6 (Central (CST))
  - Summer (DST): UTC-5 (CDT)
- Area code: 660
- GNIS feature ID: 740721

Cardy (also La Crosse, LaCrosse) is an unincorporated community in Macon County, Missouri, United States.

An early variant name was "La Crosse". A post office called La Crosse was established in 1888, and remained in operation until 1957. La Crosse is a name derived from the French language, meaning "the cross".
