= Axtell, Missouri =

Unincorporated community in Missouri, U.S.

Coordinates: 39°49′28″N 92°28′23″W

Axtell is an unincorporated community in Macon County, Missouri, United States. It lies at the intersection of U.S. Route 63 and Missouri Supplemental Route AX, 6 miles (10 km) north of Macon.

A post office operated in Axtell from 1898 to 1931.
