= Ardmore, Missouri =

Unincorporated community in Missouri, U.S.

Coordinates: 39°38′35″N 92°32′09″W

Ardmore is an unincorporated community in Macon County, in the U.S. state of Missouri.

== History ==
Ardmore was platted in the early 1890s as a mining community. A post office called Ardmore was established in 1889, and remained in operation until 1929.

In 1925, Ardmore had 550 inhabitants.
