= Hammack, Missouri =

Unincorporated community in Missouri, U.S.

Coordinates: 39°43′02″N 92°43′32″W

Hammack is an unincorporated community in Macon County, in the U.S. state of Missouri.

== History ==
A post office called Hammack was established in 1896, and remained in operation until 1904. The community was named after one Mr. Hammack, the proprietor of a nearby mill.
