= Wien, Missouri =

Unincorporated community in Missouri, U.S.

Coordinates: 39°39′39″N 92°47′04″W

Wien is an unincorporated community in northeast Chariton County, in the U.S. state of Missouri. The community is on Missouri Route 129 approximately 16 miles north of Salisbury.

== History ==
Wien was platted in 1877, and named after Vienna (German: Wien), the capital of Austria. A post office called Wien was established in 1873, and remained in operation until 1903.
