= Barryville, Missouri =

Unincorporated community in Missouri, U.S.

Coordinates: 39°40′04″N 92°39′44″W

Barryville is an unincorporated community in Macon County, in the U.S. state of Missouri. The site is approximately 12 miles (19 km) southwest of Macon.

== History ==
Barryville had its start as a post office to the surrounding area. A post office called Barryville was established in 1872, and remained in operation until 1899.
