= Sue City, Missouri =

Unincorporated community in Missouri, U.S.

Coordinates: 39°58′02″N 92°21′55″W

Sue City is an unincorporated community in Macon County, in the U.S. state of Missouri.

== History ==
Sue City was platted in 1868, and named after Susan Ryster, the wife of a first settler. A post office called Sue City was established in 1868, and remained in operation until 1900.
