= Thomas Hill, Missouri =

Unincorporated community in Missouri, U.S.

Coordinates: 39°31′15″N 92°39′21″W

Thomas Hill is an unincorporated community in northwest Randolph County, in the U.S. state of Missouri. The community is located on Missouri Route F, just east of Missouri Route 3. The Thomas Hill Reservoir dam is about two miles to the north.

== History ==
A post office called Thomas Hill was established in 1874, and remained in operation until 1902. The community has the name of William Thomas, a pioneer citizen.
