= Longville, Missouri =

Extinct hamlet in Missouri, U.S.

Coordinates: 39.691980°N 92.334905°W

Longville is an extinct town in Macon County, in the U.S. state of Missouri.

A post office called Longville was established in 1900, and remained in operation until 1904. It is unknown why the name Longville was applied to this community.
