= Cottage, Missouri =

Unincorporated community in Missouri, U.S.

Coordinates: 39°59′00″N 92°34′54″W

Cottage is an unincorporated community in Macon County, in the U.S. state of Missouri.

== History ==
Cottage was founded to serve as a post office for the immediate rural area. A post office called Cottage was established in 1891, and remained in operation until 1904.
