= Middle Fork Township, Macon County, Missouri =

Township in Macon County, Missouri, U.S.

Coordinates: 39.649°N 92.355°W

Middle Fork Township is an inactive township in Macon County, in the U.S. state of Missouri.

Middle Fork Township took its name from the Middle Fork Salt River.
