= Nickellton, Missouri =

Unincorporated community in Missouri, U.S.

Coordinates: 39°55′36″N 92°18′27″W

Nickellton is an unincorporated community in Macon County, in the U.S. state of Missouri.

== History ==
A post office was established at Nickellton in 1883, and remained in operation until 1918. The community has the name of Davidson Nickell, an early settler.
