= Keota, Missouri =

Unincorporated community in Missouri, U.S.

Coordinates: 39°42′27″N 92°34′36″W

Keota is an unincorporated community that is located in Macon County, in the U.S. state of Missouri.

== History ==
Keota had its start in 1900 as a coal town. A post office called Keota was established in 1900 and remained in operation until 1925.
