= Tullvania, Missouri =

Extinct hamlet in Missouri, U.S.

Coordinates: 40.003917°N 92.812975°W

Tullvania is an extinct town in Macon County, in the U.S. state of Missouri.

Tullvania was laid out in the late 1850s. A post office called Tullvania was established in 1858, and remained in operation until 1915. Nicholas Tull, an early postmaster, gave the community his last name. As of 1959, no buildings stood on the site.
