= Walnut, Missouri =

Unincorporated community in Missouri, U.S.

Coordinates: 39°59′25″N 92°43′06″W

Walnut is an unincorporated community in Macon County, in the U.S. state of Missouri.

== History ==
A post office called Walnut was established in 1882, and remained in operation until 1914. The community took its name from nearby Walnut Creek.
