= Cox, Missouri =

Unincorporated community in Missouri, U.S.

Coordinates: 39°38′14″N 92°22′59″W

Cox is an unincorporated community in Macon County, in the U.S. state of Missouri.

== History ==
A post office called Cox was established in 1887, and remained in operation until 1907. W. S. Cox, an early postmaster, gave the community his last name.
