= Woodville, Missouri =

Unincorporated community in Missouri, U.S.

Coordinates: 39°37′13″N 92°20′11″W

Woodville is an unincorporated community in Macon County, in the U.S. state of Missouri.

== History ==
A post office called Woodville was established in 1837, and remained in operation until 1907. Originally called "Old Centerville", the town site was not platted until 1883.
