= Finks-Harvey Plantation =

Historic house in Missouri, United States

- U.S. National Register of Historic Places
- Location within Missouri Location within the United States
- Location: West of Roanoke, near Roanoke, Missouri
- Coordinates: 39°19′20″N 92°45′11″W
- Area: 3.9 acres (1.6 ha)
- Built: c. 1873-1876
- Architectural style: Italianate
- NRHP reference No.: 78001649
- Added to NRHP: December 11, 1978

Finks-Harvey Plantation, also known as Woodland Park and Roseland, is a historic home located near Roanoke, Howard County, Missouri. It was built between about 1873 and 1876, and is a two-story, five-bay, Italianate style brick dwelling. It features a bracketed cornice, projecting bays, quoins, and segmental-arched windows.

It was listed on the National Register of Historic Places in 1978.
