= Hart, Macon County, Missouri =

Extinct hamlet in Missouri, U.S.

Coordinates: 39°50′11″N 92°49′24″W

Hart is an extinct village on the Santa Fe Railroad in Russell Township, Macon County, Missouri. The GNIS classifies it as a populated place. A variant name was Evelyn, the name of the local post office. A post office called Evelyn was established in 1888, and remained in operation until 1916. Besides the post office, Hart had a railroad depot.
