= Ten Mile, Macon County, Missouri =

Unincorporated community in Missouri

Coordinates: 39°48′30″N 92°22′31″W

Ten Mile is an unincorporated community in Macon County, in the U.S. state of Missouri.

== History ==
A post office called Ten Mile was established in 1847, and remained in operation until 1902. The community was named after nearby Ten Mile Creek.
