= Goldsberry, Missouri =

Unincorporated community in Missouri, U.S.

Coordinates: 39°57′44″N 92°46′10″W

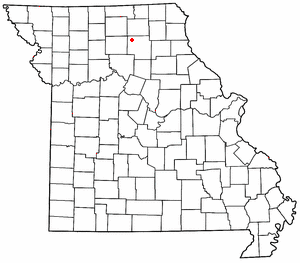

Goldsberry is an unincorporated community in Macon County, Missouri, United States. The community is located on Route 149, approximately twenty-one miles northwest of Macon. Its post office has closed and mail is now delivered from nearby Ethel.

Goldsberry was platted in 1882 by E. S. Goldsberry, and named after him. A post office called Goldsberry was established in 1882, and remained in operation until 1974.
