= West Point, Illinois =

- Village
- Location of West Point in Hancock County, Illinois.
- Coordinates: 40°15′20″N 91°11′00″W
- Country: United States
- State: Illinois
- County: Hancock

Area
  - Total: 0.17 sq mi (0.43 km^{2})
  - Land: 0.17 sq mi (0.43 km^{2})
  - Water: 0 sq mi (0.00 km^{2})
- Elevation: 669 ft (204 m)

Population (2020)
  - Total: 140
  - Density: 833.9/sq mi (321.97/km^{2})
- Time zone: UTC-6 (CST)
  - Summer (DST): UTC-5 (CDT)
- ZIP code: 62380
- Area code: 217
- FIPS code: 17-80762
- GNIS feature ID: 2400141

West Point is a village in Hancock County, Illinois, United States. The population was 140 at the 2020 census.

== Geography ==
West Point is located in southern Hancock County 14 miles (23 km) south of Carthage, the county seat.

According to the 2021 census gazetteer files, West Point has a total area of 0.17 square miles (0.44 km^{2}), all land.

== Demographics ==
Historical population
Census	Pop.	Note	%±
1880	173		—
1900	277		—
1910	292		5.4%
1920	303		3.8%
1930	257		−15.2%
1940	278		8.2%
1950	275		−1.1%
1960	234		−14.9%
1970	237		1.3%
1980	223		−5.9%
1990	214		−4.0%
2000	195		−8.9%
2010	178		−8.7%
2020	140		−21.3%
U.S. Decennial Census

As of the 2020 census there were 140 people, 66 households, and 50 families residing in the village. The population density was 833.33 inhabitants per square mile (321.75/km^{2}). There were 67 housing units at an average density of 398.81 per square mile (153.98/km^{2}). The racial makeup of the village was 100.00% White, 0.00% African American, 0.00% Native American, 0.00% Asian, 0.00% Pacific Islander, 0.00% from other races, and 0.00% from two or more races. Hispanic or Latino of any race were 0.71% of the population.

There were 66 households, out of which 42.4% had children under the age of 18 living with them, 54.55% were married couples living together, 10.61% had a female householder with no husband present, and 24.24% were non-families. 22.73% of all households were made up of individuals, and 9.09% had someone living alone who was 65 years of age or older. The average household size was 3.88 and the average family size was 3.32.

The village's age distribution consisted of 35.6% under the age of 18, 2.7% from 18 to 24, 22.8% from 25 to 44, 26.1% from 45 to 64, and 12.8% who were 65 years of age or older. The median age was 39.0 years. For every 100 females, there were 78.0 males. For every 100 females age 18 and over, there were 101.4 males.

The median income for a household in the village was $49,167, and the median income for a family was $50,714. Males had a median income of $45,625 versus $27,250 for females. The per capita income for the village was $15,633. About 30.0% of families and 42.0% of the population were below the poverty line, including 53.8% of those under age 18 and 46.4% of those age 65 or over.
