= Lincoln Township, Putnam County, Missouri =

Township in Putnam County, Missouri, U.S.

Coordinates: 40.51°N 92.90°W

Lincoln Township is a township in northern Putnam County, Missouri.

The organization date and origin of the name of Lincoln Township is unknown.
