= Morrow Township, Macon County, Missouri =

Inactive township in the American state of Missouri

Coordinates: 39.65°N 92.65°W

Morrow Township is an inactive township in Macon County, in the U.S. state of Missouri.

Morrow Township has the name of William Morrow, a pioneer settler.
