= Seney, Missouri =

Unincorporated community in Missouri, U.S.

Coordinates: 39°50′51″N 92°34′54″W

Seney is an unincorporated community in Macon County, in the U.S. state of Missouri.

== History ==
A post office called Seney was established in 1874, and remained in operation until 1904. The community has the name of Seney Price, an early settler.
