= White Township, Macon County, Missouri =

Township in Macon County, Missouri, U.S.

Coordinates: 39.89°N 92.77°W

White Township is an inactive township in Macon County, in the U.S. state of Missouri. The township is located at an elevation of 920 feet (280 m). It is named after Randolph White, a pioneer settler.
