= Love Lake, Missouri =

Unincorporated community in Missouri, U.S.

Coordinates: 39°57′20″N 92°29′09″W

Love Lake (also called Love Lake City) is an unincorporated community in Macon County, in the U.S. state of Missouri.

== History ==
Love Lake was platted in 1868 by James M. Love, and named for him. A post office called Love Lake City was established in 1870, the name was changed to Love Lake in 1886, and the post office closed in 1919.
