= Ethel, Missouri =

- Town
- Location in Macon County and the state of Missouri
- Coordinates: 39°53′36″N 92°44′28″W
- Country: United States
- State: Missouri
- County: Macon

Area
  - Total: 0.23 sq mi (0.60 km^{2})
  - Land: 0.23 sq mi (0.60 km^{2})
  - Water: 0 sq mi (0.00 km^{2})
- Elevation: 824 ft (251 m)

Population (2020)
  - Total: 41
  - Density: 177.6/sq mi (68.59/km^{2})
- Time zone: UTC-6 (Central (CST))
  - Summer (DST): UTC-5 (CDT)
- ZIP code: 63539
- Area code: 660
- FIPS code: 29-22672
- GNIS feature ID: 2396929

Ethel is a town in Macon County, Missouri, United States. The population was 41 at the 2020 census, down from 62 in 2010.

== History ==
Ethel had its start in 1888 when the Atchison, Topeka and Santa Fe Railway was extended to that point. An early variant name was "Ratliff".

A post office called Ethel has been in operation since 1890. On July 26, 2011, the U.S. Postal Service announced plans to permanently close the Ethel post office as part of a nationwide restructuring plan.

== Geography ==
Ethel is in western Macon County. Missouri Route 149 passes through the town as Oak Street and West Main Street, leading south 9 miles (14 km) to New Cambria and north 17 miles (27 km) to Route 11. Macon, the county seat, is 23 miles (37 km) to the southeast.

According to the U.S. Census Bureau, Ethel has a total area of 0.23 square miles (0.60 km^{2}), all land. The town drains to Little Turkey Creek, an east-flowing tributary of the Chariton River.

== Demographics ==
Historical population
Census	Pop.	Note	%±
1900	397		—
1910	423		6.5%
1920	329		−22.2%
1930	359		9.1%
1940	317		−11.7%
1950	226		−28.7%
1960	149		−34.1%
1970	162		8.7%
1980	145		−10.5%
1990	71		−51.0%
2000	100		40.8%
2010	62		−38.0%
2020	41		−33.9%
U.S. Decennial Census

=== 2010 census ===
As of the census of 2010, there were 62 people, 36 households, and 17 families living in the city. The population density was 269.6 inhabitants per square mile (104.1/km^{2}). There were 54 housing units at an average density of 234.8 per square mile (90.7/km^{2}). The racial makeup of the city was 98.4% White and 1.6% from two or more races. Hispanic or Latino of any race were 1.6% of the population.

There were 36 households, of which 8.3% had children under the age of 18 living with them, 44.4% were married couples living together, 2.8% had a female householder with no husband present, and 52.8% were non-families. 50.0% of all households were made up of individuals, and 33.3% had someone living alone who was 65 years of age or older. The average household size was 1.72 and the average family size was 2.41.

The median age in the city was 60.5 years. 6.5% of residents were under the age of 18; 1.5% were between the ages of 18 and 24; 19.3% were from 25 to 44; 33.9% were from 45 to 64; and 38.7% were 65 years of age or older. The gender makeup of the city was 56.5% male and 43.5% female.

=== 2000 census ===
As of the census of 2000, there were 100 people, 46 households, and 28 families living in the town. The population density was 419.3 inhabitants per square mile (161.9/km^{2}). There were 55 housing units at an average density of 230.6 per square mile (89.0/km^{2}). The racial makeup of the town was 97.00% White and 3.00% Native American.

There were 46 households, out of which 17.4% had children under the age of 18 living with them, 43.5% were married couples living together, 15.2% had a female householder with no husband present, and 39.1% were non-families. 32.6% of all households were made up of individuals, and 17.4% had someone living alone who was 65 years of age or older. The average household size was 2.17 and the average family size was 2.61.

In the town the population was spread out, with 16.0% under the age of 18, 7.0% from 18 to 24, 15.0% from 25 to 44, 38.0% from 45 to 64, and 24.0% who were 65 years of age or older. The median age was 54 years. For every 100 females there were 81.8 males. For every 100 females age 18 and over, there were 71.4 males.

The median income for a household in the town was $22,500, and the median income for a family was $25,000. Males had a median income of $50,833 versus $27,500 for females. The per capita income for the town was $16,126. There were 15.4% of families and 18.6% of the population living below the poverty line, including 80.0% of under eighteens and 9.1% of those over 64.
