= Goldsberry (surname) =

Goldsberry is a surname. Notable people with this surname include:

- Gordon Goldsberry (1927–1996), American baseball player, scout and executive
- John Goldsberry (born 1982), American basketball player
- Kirk Goldsberry (born 1977), basketball writer and former basketball executive
- Renée Elise Goldsberry (born 1971), American actress, singer and songwriter
