= Redman, Missouri =

Unincorporated community in Missouri, U.S.

Coordinates: 39°51′56″N 92°20′13″W

Redman is an unincorporated community in Macon County, in the U.S. state of Missouri.

== History ==
An old variant name was "Ettle". A post office called Ettle was established in 1882, the name was changed to Redman in 1890, and the post office closed in 1914. The present name most likely honors George Redman, an early settler.
