= Marceline Township, Linn County, Missouri =

Township in Missouri, U.S.

Coordinates: 39°43′37″N 92°56′39″W

Marceline Township is a township in southeastern Linn County, in the U.S. state of Missouri.

Marceline Township is named after the city of Marceline.
