= Kaseyville, Missouri =

Unincorporated community in Missouri, U.S.

Coordinates: 39°37′28″N 92°39′48″W

Kaseyville is an unincorporated community in Macon County, in the U.S. state of Missouri.

== History ==
A post office called Kaseyville was established in 1867 and remained in operation until 1908. Singleton L. Kasey, an early postmaster, gave the community his last name.
