= Baker Township, Linn County, Missouri =

Township in Linn County, Missouri, U.S.

Coordinates: 39°54′36″N 92°55′26″W

Baker Township is a township in Linn County, in the U.S. state of Missouri.

Baker Township has the name of Samuel Baker, a county commissioner.
