= Callao Township, Macon County, Missouri =

Inactive township in the US state of Missouri

Coordinates: 39.7409938°N 92.6599318°W

Callao Township is an inactive township in Macon County, in the U.S. state of Missouri.

Callao Township takes its name from the community of Callao, Missouri.
