= New Cambria, Missouri =

- City
- Location in Macon County and the state of Missouri
- Coordinates: 39°46′35″N 92°45′05″W
- Country: United States
- State: Missouri
- County: Macon

Area
  - Total: 0.68 sq mi (1.75 km^{2})
  - Land: 0.67 sq mi (1.74 km^{2})
  - Water: 0.0039 sq mi (0.01 km^{2})
- Elevation: 863 ft (263 m)

Population (2020)
  - Total: 153
  - Density: 227.6/sq mi (87.86/km^{2})
- Time zone: UTC-6 (Central (CST))
  - Summer (DST): UTC-5 (CDT)
- ZIP code: 63558
- Area code: 660
- FIPS code: 29-51734
- GNIS feature ID: 2395188

New Cambria is a city in Macon County, Missouri, United States. The population was 153 at the 2020 census, down from 195 in 2010.

== History ==
New Cambria was first named "Stockton", and under the latter name laid out in 1861 and named after James Stocks, a railroad man. The present name New Cambria means "New Wales". A post office called New Cambria has been in operation since 1864.

The Gardner and Tinsley Filling Station was listed on the National Register of Historic Places in 2002.

== Geography ==
New Cambria is in southwestern Macon County. Missouri Route 149 passes through the city as Main Street and East Roberts Street, leading north 9 miles (14 km) to Ethel. U.S. Route 36 passes just south of the city limits, leading east 15 miles (24 km) to Macon, the county seat, and west 18 miles (29 km) to Brookfield. The Brookfield Subdivision of BNSF Railway runs east-west through the center of the city.

According to the U.S. Census Bureau, New Cambria has a total area of 0.68 square miles (1.76 km^{2}), of which 0.003 square miles (1.9 acres), or 0.44%, are water. The city sits on a low ridge which drains east toward the Chariton River and west to Puzzle Creek, a south-flowing tributary of the Chariton.

== Demographics ==
Historical population
Census	Pop.	Note	%±
1880	275		—
1890	410		49.1%
1900	352		−14.1%
1910	387		9.9%
1920	313		−19.1%
1930	360		15.0%
1940	318		−11.7%
1950	295		−7.2%
1960	270		−8.5%
1970	260		−3.7%
1980	246		−5.4%
1990	223		−9.3%
2000	222		−0.4%
2010	195		−12.2%
2020	153		−21.5%
U.S. Decennial Census

=== 2010 census ===
As of the census of 2010, there were 195 people, 84 households, and 49 families living in the city. The population density was 291.0 inhabitants per square mile (112.4/km^{2}). There were 108 housing units at an average density of 161.2 per square mile (62.2/km^{2}). The racial makeup of the city was 94.4% White, 0.5% Native American, and 5.1% Asian. Hispanic or Latino of any race were 3.1% of the population.

There were 84 households, of which 23.8% had children under the age of 18 living with them, 38.1% were married couples living together, 13.1% had a female householder with no husband present, 7.1% had a male householder with no wife present, and 41.7% were non-families. 34.5% of all households were made up of individuals, and 9.6% had someone living alone who was 65 years of age or older. The average household size was 2.32 and the average family size was 3.00.

The median age in the city was 37.5 years. 21.5% of residents were under the age of 18; 15.9% were between the ages of 18 and 24; 23.6% were from 25 to 44; 26.7% were from 45 to 64; and 12.3% were 65 years of age or older. The gender makeup of the city was 51.3% male and 48.7% female.

=== 2000 census ===
As of the census of 2000, there were 222 people, 96 households, and 54 families living in the city. The population density was 329.2 inhabitants per square mile (127.1/km^{2}). There were 127 housing units at an average density of 188.3 per square mile (72.7/km^{2}). The racial makeup of the city was 97.30% White, 0.45% African American, 0.90% Native American, and 1.35% from two or more races. Hispanic or Latino of any race were 0.45% of the population.

There were 96 households, out of which 27.1% had children under the age of 18 living with them, 41.7% were married couples living together, 8.3% had a female householder with no husband present, and 43.8% were non-families. 38.5% of all households were made up of individuals, and 22.9% had someone living alone who was 65 years of age or older. The average household size was 2.31 and the average family size was 3.11.

In the city, the population was spread out, with 25.7% under the age of 18, 7.7% from 18 to 24, 23.9% from 25 to 44, 19.8% from 45 to 64, and 23.0% who were 65 years of age or older. The median age was 38 years. For every 100 females there were 101.8 males. For every 100 females age 18 and over, there were 89.7 males.

The median income for a household in the city was $25,536 and the median income for a family was $44,500. Males had a median income of $21,875 versus $19,821 for females. The per capita income for the city was $14,331. None of the families and 6.1% of the population were living below the poverty line, including no under eighteens and 12.0% of those over 64.
