= College Mound, Missouri =

Unincorporated community in Missouri, U.S.

Coordinates: 39°37′23″N 92°34′22″W

College Mound is an unincorporated community in southwestern Macon County, Missouri, United States. The community lies approximately 12 miles (19 km) southwest of Macon.

College Mound was platted in 1854, and named after nearby McGee College. A post office called College Mound was established in 1858, and remained in operation until 1973.
