= Clifton Hill, Missouri =

- City
- Location of Clifton Hill, Missouri
- Coordinates: 39°26′19″N 92°39′49″W
- Country: United States
- State: Missouri
- County: Randolph

Area
  - Total: 0.17 sq mi (0.45 km^{2})
  - Land: 0.17 sq mi (0.45 km^{2})
  - Water: 0 sq mi (0.00 km^{2})
- Elevation: 735 ft (224 m)

Population (2020)
  - Total: 88
  - Density: 503.5/sq mi (194.42/km^{2})
- Time zone: UTC-6 (Central (CST))
  - Summer (DST): UTC-5 (CDT)
- ZIP code: 65244
- Area code: 660
- FIPS code: 29-14896
- GNIS feature ID: 2393564

Clifton Hill is a city in Randolph County, Missouri, United States. As of the 2020 census, Clifton Hill had a population of 88.

== History ==
Clifton Hill was platted on a hill in 1866, and named after David Clifton, the original owner of the land where the village now stands. A post office called Clifton Hill has been in operation since 1868.

== Geography ==
According to the United States Census Bureau, the city has a total area of 0.17 square miles (0.44 km^{2}), all land.

== Demographics ==
Historical population
Census	Pop.	Note	%±
1880	132		—
1930	264		—
1940	278		5.3%
1950	262		−5.8%
1960	207		−21.0%
1970	174		−15.9%
1980	152		−12.6%
1990	108		−28.9%
2000	124		14.8%
2010	114		−8.1%
2020	88		−22.8%
U.S. Decennial Census

=== 2010 census ===
As of the census of 2010, there were 114 people, 44 households, and 28 families living in the city. The population density was 670.6 inhabitants per square mile (258.9/km^{2}). There were 51 housing units at an average density of 300.0 per square mile (115.8/km^{2}). The racial makeup of the city was 93.9% White, 3.5% African American, and 2.6% from two or more races.

There were 44 households, of which 40.9% had children under the age of 18 living with them, 43.2% were married couples living together, 15.9% had a female householder with no husband present, 4.5% had a male householder with no wife present, and 36.4% were non-families. 31.8% of all households were made up of individuals, and 15.9% had someone living alone who was 65 years of age or older. The average household size was 2.59 and the average family size was 3.25.

The median age in the city was 34 years. 32.5% of residents were under the age of 18; 7.8% were between the ages of 18 and 24; 17.5% were from 25 to 44; 27.1% were from 45 to 64; and 14.9% were 65 years of age or older. The gender makeup of the city was 46.5% male and 53.5% female.

=== 2000 census ===
As of the census of 2000, there were 124 people, 49 households, and 34 families living in the city. The population density was 944.8 inhabitants per square mile (364.8/km^{2}). There were 60 housing units at an average density of 457.2 per square mile (176.5/km^{2}). The racial makeup of the city was 96.77% White and 3.23% African American.

There were 49 households, out of which 32.7% had children under the age of 18 living with them, 57.1% were married couples living together, 12.2% had a female householder with no husband present, and 30.6% were non-families. 26.5% of all households were made up of individuals, and 8.2% had someone living alone who was 65 years of age or older. The average household size was 2.53 and the average family size was 2.88.

In the city the population was spread out, with 31.5% under the age of 18, 5.6% from 18 to 24, 21.0% from 25 to 44, 28.2% from 45 to 64, and 13.7% who were 65 years of age or older. The median age was 40 years. For every 100 females there were 87.9 males. For every 100 females age 18 and over, there were 77.1 males.

The median income for a household in the city was $26,250, and the median income for a family was $28,438. Males had a median income of $38,750 versus $20,625 for females. The per capita income for the city was $11,637. There were 18.9% of families and 20.8% of the population living below the poverty line, including 15.4% of under eighteens and 52.6% of those over 64.

== Education ==
Clifton Hill is the home of Westran Middle School, which is part of the Westran School District.

== Public safety ==
Clifton Hill is served by the Westran Fire District.

== Religion ==
There are two churches in Clifton Hill, the Clifton Hill United Methodist Church and the Clifton Hill Baptist Church.
