= Bevier Township, Macon County, Missouri =

Township in the American state of Missouri

Coordinates: 39.7408°N 92.5664°W

Bevier Township is a township in Macon County, in the U.S. state of Missouri.

Bevier Township takes its name from Col. Robert Bevier, who afterward became a leader of the Confederate army.
