= Valley Township, Macon County, Missouri =

Township in Macon County, Missouri, U.S.

Coordinates: 39.82917°N 92.68505°W

Valley Township is an inactive township in Macon County, in the U.S. state of Missouri.

Valley Township was originally called Loe Township; the present name was adopted in 1872.
