= North Salem Township, Linn County, Missouri =

Township in Missouri, U.S.

Coordinates: 40°00′00″N 92°55′54″W

North Salem Township is a township in northeastern Linn County, in the U.S. state of Missouri.

North Salem Township is named after a settlement of the area named North Salem.
