= Hudson Township, Macon County, Missouri =

Inactive township in the US state of Missouri

Coordinates: 39.7372°N 92.4594°W

Hudson Township is an inactive township in Macon County, in the U.S. state of Missouri.

Hudson Township most likely took its name from the Hudson Land Company.
