= Jefferson Township, Linn County, Missouri =

Township in Linn County, Missouri, U.S.

Coordinates: 39°46′17″N 93°10′33″W

Jefferson Township is a township in Linn County, in the U.S. state of Missouri.

Jefferson Township was established in 1845, and most likely named after President Thomas Jefferson.
