= Elmer, Missouri =

- City
- Location of Elmer, Missouri
- Coordinates: 39°57′26″N 92°39′00″W
- Country: United States
- State: Missouri
- County: Macon

Area
  - Total: 0.25 sq mi (0.66 km^{2})
  - Land: 0.25 sq mi (0.66 km^{2})
  - Water: 0 sq mi (0.00 km^{2})
- Elevation: 735 ft (224 m)

Population (2020)
  - Total: 51
  - Density: 201.4/sq mi (77.75/km^{2})
- Time zone: UTC-6 (Central (CST))
  - Summer (DST): UTC-5 (CDT)
- ZIP code: 63538
- Area code: 660
- FIPS code: 29-21988
- GNIS feature ID: 2394672

Elmer is a city in Macon County, Missouri, United States. The population was 51 at the 2020 census, down from 80 in 2010.

== History ==
Elmer had its start in 1888 when the Atchison, Topeka and Santa Fe Railway was extended to that point.

A post office called Elmer has been in operation since 1889. On July 26, 2011, the U.S. Postal Service announced plans to permanently close the Elmer post office as part of a nationwide restructuring plan.

== Geography ==
Elmer is in northern Macon County, 9 miles (14 km) southwest of La Plata and 23 miles (37 km) northwest of Macon, the county seat. The Marceline Subdivision of the BNSF Railway passes through the city, leading southwest to Marceline and northeast to Fort Madison, Iowa. Elmer sits on the east side of the valley of the Chariton River, a south-flowing tributary of the Missouri River.

According to the U.S. Census Bureau, the city has a total area of 0.25 square miles (0.65 km^{2}), of which 0.001 square miles (0.6 acres), or 0.43%, are water.

== Demographics ==
Historical population
Census	Pop.	Note	%±
1900	236		—
1910	512		116.9%
1920	349		−31.8%
1930	346		−0.9%
1940	238		−31.2%
1950	295		23.9%
1960	266		−9.8%
1970	193		−27.4%
1980	180		−6.7%
1990	91		−49.4%
2000	98		7.7%
2010	80		−18.4%
2020	51		−36.2%
U.S. Decennial Census

=== 2010 census ===
As of the census of 2010, there were 80 people, 36 households, and 23 families living in the city. The population density was 320.0 inhabitants per square mile (123.6/km^{2}). There were 47 housing units at an average density of 188.0 per square mile (72.6/km^{2}). The racial makeup of the city was 97.5% White and 2.5% from two or more races. Hispanic or Latino of any race were 2.5% of the population.

There were 36 households, of which 22.2% had children under the age of 18 living with them, 52.8% were married couples living together, 5.6% had a female householder with no husband present, 5.6% had a male householder with no wife present, and 36.1% were non-families. 30.6% of all households were made up of individuals, and 13.9% had someone living alone who was 65 years of age or older. The average household size was 2.22 and the average family size was 2.78.

The median age in the city was 51.6 years. 22.5% of residents were under the age of 18; 1.3% were between the ages of 18 and 24; 15.1% were from 25 to 44; 33.8% were from 45 to 64; and 27.5% were 65 years of age or older. The gender makeup of the city was 51.3% male and 48.8% female.

=== 2000 census ===
As of the census of 2000, there were 98 people, 46 households, and 27 families living in the city. The population density was 402.0 inhabitants per square mile (155.2/km^{2}). There were 55 housing units at an average density of 225.6 per square mile (87.1/km^{2}). The racial makeup of the city was 100.00% White.

There were 46 households, out of which 26.1% had children under the age of 18 living with them, 43.5% were married couples living together, 13.0% had a female householder with no husband present, and 41.3% were non-families. 37.0% of all households were made up of individuals, and 13.0% had someone living alone who was 65 years of age or older. The average household size was 2.13 and the average family size was 2.74.

In the city the population was spread out, with 23.5% under the age of 18, 6.1% from 18 to 24, 25.5% from 25 to 44, 28.6% from 45 to 64, and 16.3% who were 65 years of age or older. The median age was 43 years. For every 100 females there were 92.2 males. For every 100 females age 18 and over, there were 92.3 males.

The median income for a household in the city was $16,250, and the median income for a family was $30,750. Males had a median income of $18,125 versus $15,972 for females. The per capita income for the city was $9,834. There were 11.8% of families and 29.5% of the population living below the poverty line, including 40.0% of under eighteens and 13.3% of those over 64.
