= Roanoke, Missouri =

Unincorporated community in Missouri, U.S.

Coordinates: 39°19′01″N 92°41′20″W

Roanoke (/ˈroʊənoʊk/ ROH-ə-nohk) is an unincorporated community in Howard and Randolph counties, in the U.S. state of Missouri.

== History ==
The first settlement at Roanoke was made in 1836. The community took its name from Roanoke Plantation, in Virginia, the native state of a first settler. A post office was established on the Randolph County side in 1838, where it remained in operation until it was discontinued in 1871.

The Finks-Harvey Plantation was listed on the National Register of Historic Places in 1978.

== Demographics ==
Historical population
Census	Pop.	Note	%±
1900	147		—
1910	110		−25.2%
1920	85		−22.7%
1930	103		21.2%
1940	75		−27.2%
1950	65		−13.3%
1960	34		−47.7%
1970	34		0.0%
Missouri Census Data Center
