= Miller Township, Marion County, Missouri =

Township in Marion County, Missouri, U.S.

Coordinates: 39.7367°N 91.4475°W

Miller Township is an inactive township in Marion County, in the U.S. state of Missouri.

Miller Township was established in 1847, and named after Samuel Miller, a pioneer citizen.
