= Armstrong, Missouri =

- City
- Location of Armstrong, Missouri
- Coordinates: 39°16′8″N 92°42′3″W
- Country: United States
- State: Missouri
- County: Howard
- Incorporated: 1953

Area
  - Total: 0.82 sq mi (2.12 km^{2})
  - Land: 0.82 sq mi (2.12 km^{2})
  - Water: 0 sq mi (0.00 km^{2})
- Elevation: 846 ft (258 m)

Population (2020)
  - Total: 243
  - Density: 296.2/sq mi (114.36/km^{2})
- Time zone: UTC-6 (Central (CST))
  - Summer (DST): UTC-5 (CDT)
- ZIP code: 65230
- Area code: 660
- FIPS code: 29-01954
- GNIS feature ID: 0713388

Armstrong is a city in Howard County, Missouri, United States. The population was 243 at the 2020 census. It is part of the Columbia, Missouri Metropolitan Statistical Area.

== History ==
Armstrong was platted in 1878, and named after one Mr. Armstrong, a railroad promoter. A post office called Armstrong has been in operation since 1878.

== Geography ==
Armstrong is located at 39°16′8″N 92°42′3″W (39.268832, -92.700938). According to the United States Census Bureau, the city has a total area of 0.82 square miles (2.12 km^{2}), all land.

== Demographics ==
Historical population
Census	Pop.	Note	%±
1880	76		—
1890	248		226.3%
1900	461		85.9%
1910	579		25.6%
1920	616		6.4%
1930	548		−11.0%
1940	468		−14.6%
1950	424		−9.4%
1960	387		−8.7%
1970	354		−8.5%
1980	360		1.7%
1990	310		−13.9%
2000	287		−7.4%
2010	284		−1.0%
2020	243		−14.4%
U.S. Decennial Census

=== 2010 census ===
As of the census of 2010, there were 284 people, 111 households, and 78 families residing in the city. The population density was 346.3 inhabitants per square mile (133.7/km^{2}). There were 137 housing units at an average density of 167.1 per square mile (64.5/km^{2}). The racial makeup of the city was 95.1% White, 1.8% African American, 2.1% Native American, and 1.1% from two or more races.

There were 111 households, of which 36.0% had children under the age of 18 living with them, 55.9% were married couples living together, 9.0% had a female householder with no husband present, 5.4% had a male householder with no wife present, and 29.7% were non-families. 24.3% of all households were made up of individuals, and 12.6% had someone living alone who was 65 years of age or older. The average household size was 2.56 and the average family size was 3.08.

The median age in the city was 37.5 years. 26.4% of residents were under the age of 18; 8.9% were between the ages of 18 and 24; 22.5% were from 25 to 44; 29.5% were from 45 to 64; and 12.7% were 65 years of age or older. The gender makeup of the city was 50.7% male and 49.3% female.

=== 2000 census ===
As of the census of 2000, there were 287 people, 115 households, and 77 families residing in the city. The population density was 340.5 inhabitants per square mile (131.5/km^{2}). There were 142 housing units at an average density of 168.5 per square mile (65.1/km^{2}). The racial makeup of the city was 92.33% White, 5.92% African American, and 1.74% from two or more races.

There were 115 households, out of which 32.2% had children under the age of 18 living with them, 47.0% were married couples living together, 13.9% had a female householder with no husband present, and 33.0% were non-families. 30.4% of all households were made up of individuals, and 13.9% had someone living alone who was 65 years of age or older. The average household size was 2.50 and the average family size was 3.05.

In the city the population was spread out, with 30.0% under the age of 18, 7.0% from 18 to 24, 25.4% from 25 to 44, 17.4% from 45 to 64, and 20.2% who were 65 years of age or older. The median age was 35 years. For every 100 females, there were 99.3 males. For every 100 females age 18 and over, there were 91.4 males.

The median income for a household in the city was $24,167, and the median income for a family was $27,500. Males had a median income of $19,250 versus $25,000 for females. The per capita income for the city was $13,055. About 9.0% of families and 16.5% of the population were below the poverty line, including 30.6% of those under the age of eighteen and 10.8% of those 65 or over.

== Notable people ==
- Ida M. Bowman Becks, elocutionist, suffragist, and African-American community organizer.
- Frank P. Briggs, former United States Senator and Assistant U.S. Secretary of the Interior.
