= Hamilton Township, Caldwell County, Missouri =

Township in the US state of Missouri

Hamilton Township
- Township
- Coordinates: 39°44′33″N 094°00′29″W
- Country: United States
- State: Missouri
- County: Caldwell

Area
  - Total: 34.9 sq mi (90.4 km^{2})
  - Land: 34.80 sq mi (90.12 km^{2})
  - Water: 0.11 sq mi (0.28 km^{2}) 0.31%
- Elevation: 915 ft (279 m)

Population (2000)
  - Total: 2,362
  - Density: 68/sq mi (26.2/km^{2})
- FIPS code: 29-30052
- GNIS feature ID: 0766363

Hamilton Township is one of twelve townships in Caldwell County, Missouri, and is part of the Kansas City metropolitan area with the USA. As of the 2000 census, its population was 2,362.

== History ==
Hamilton Township was established in 1867, but reorganized to its present limits in 1870.

== Geography ==
Hamilton Township covers an area of 34.9 square miles (90 km^{2}) and contains one incorporated settlement, Hamilton. It contains three cemeteries: Rorhbaugh, Bowman and Highland.

== Transportation ==
Hamilton Township contains two airports, Cliff Scott Airport and Wardell Schoff Airport.
