= Parson Creek Township, Linn County, Missouri =

Township in Missouri, U.S.

Coordinates: 39°45′47″N 93°17′54″W

Parson Creek Township is a township in southwestern Linn County, in the U.S. state of Missouri.

The township is named after the stream called Parson Creek, a tributary of the Grand River.
