= Drake Township, Macon County, Missouri =

Township in Macon County, Missouri, U.S.

Coordinates: 40.0000153°N 92.7915310°W

Drake Township is an inactive township in Macon County, in the U.S. state of Missouri.

Drake Township has the name of James Drake, a pioneer settler. He came from Iowa in 1849.
