= Bucklin Township, Linn County, Missouri =

Township in Missouri, U.S.

Coordinates: 39°48′43″N 93°54′05″W

Bucklin Township is a township in eastern Linn County, in the U.S. state of Missouri.

Bucklin Township is named after the city of Bucklin.
