= Lingo Township, Macon County, Missouri =

Township in Macon County, Missouri, U.S.

Coordinates: 39.74347°N 92.78192°W

Lingo Township is an inactive township in Macon County, in the U.S. state of Missouri.

Lingo Township has the name of Samuel Lingo, a local judge.
