= Macon County, Missouri =

County in Missouri, United States

- County
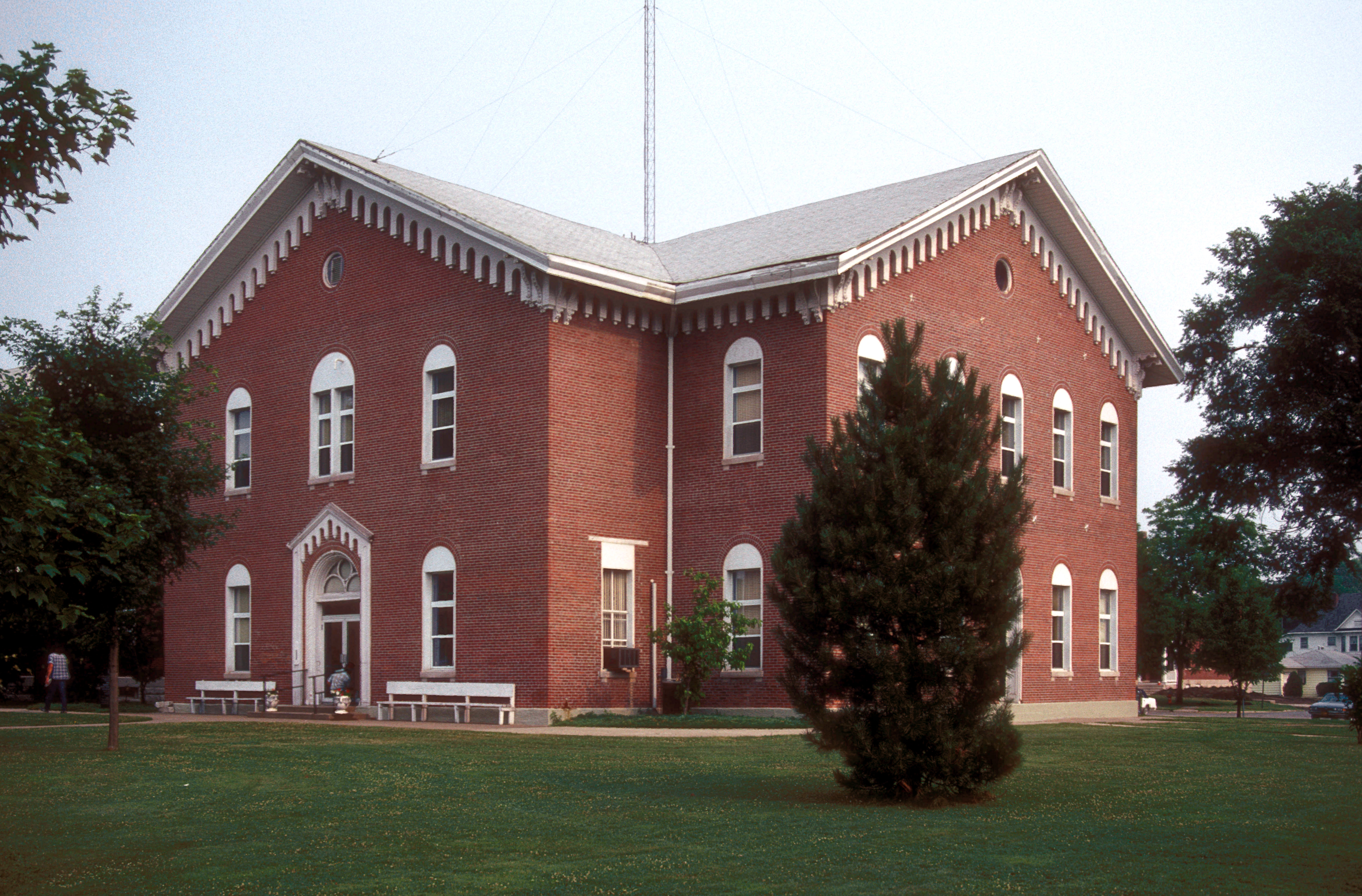
- Macon County Courthouse

- Location within the U.S. state of Missouri
- Coordinates: 39°50′N 92°34′W
- Country: United States
- State: Missouri
- Founded: January 6, 1837
- Named for: Nathaniel Macon
- Seat: Macon
- Largest city: Macon

Area
  - Total: 812 sq mi (2,100 km^{2})
  - Land: 801 sq mi (2,070 km^{2})
  - Water: 11 sq mi (28 km^{2}) 1.4%

Population (2020)
  - Total: 15,209
  - Estimate (2025): 15,190 ▼
  - Density: 19/sq mi (7.3/km^{2})
- Time zone: UTC−6 (Central)
  - Summer (DST): UTC−5 (CDT)
- Congressional district: 6th
- Website: www.maconcountymo.com

Macon County is a county located in the northern portion of the U.S. state of Missouri. As of the 2020 census, the population was 15,209. Its county seat is Macon. The county was organized January 6, 1837, and named for Nathaniel Macon, a Revolutionary War hero and North Carolina politician.

== Geography ==
According to the U.S. Census Bureau, the county has a total area of 812 square miles (2,100 km^{2}), of which 801 square miles (2,070 km^{2}) is land and 11 square miles (28 km^{2}) (1.4%) is water.

=== Adjacent counties ===
- Adair County (north)
- Knox County (northeast)
- Sullivan County (northwest)
- Shelby County (east)
- Randolph County (south)
- Monroe County (southeast)
- Chariton County (southwest)
- Linn County (west)

=== Major highways ===
- Future I-72 / US 36 / Route 110 (CKC)
  - US 36 Bus. (Clarence)
- US 63
- Route 3
- Route 149
- Route 156

=== Townships ===
- Bevier
- Callao
- Chariton
- Drake
- Eagle
- Easley
- Hudson
- Independence
- Jackson
- Johnston
- La Plata
- Liberty
- Lingo
- Lyda
- Middle Fork
- Morrow
- Narrows
- Richland
- Round Grove
- Russell
- Ten Mile
- Valley
- Walnut Creek
- White

== Demographics ==
Historical population
Census	Pop.	Note	%±
1840	1,634		—
1850	6,565		301.8%
1860	14,346		118.5%
1870	23,230		61.9%
1880	26,222		12.9%
1890	30,575		16.6%
1900	33,018		8.0%
1910	30,868		−6.5%
1920	27,518		−10.9%
1930	23,070		−16.2%
1940	21,396		−7.3%
1950	18,332		−14.3%
1960	16,473		−10.1%
1970	15,432		−6.3%
1980	16,313		5.7%
1990	15,345		−5.9%
2000	15,762		2.7%
2010	15,566		−1.2%
2020	15,209		−2.3%
2025 (est.)	15,190	▼	−0.1%
U.S. Decennial Census; 1790–1960 1900–90; 1990–2000 2010 2025

=== 2020 census ===
As of the 2020 census, the county had a population of 15,209. The median age was 43.6 years. Twenty-three point three percent of residents were under the age of 18 and 22.6% were 65 years of age or older. For every 100 females there were 97.0 males, and for every 100 females age 18 and over there were 94.3 males age 18 and over.

The racial makeup of the county was 91.1% White, 2.0% Black or African American, 0.2% American Indian and Alaska Native, 0.6% Asian, 0.0% Native Hawaiian and Pacific Islander, 0.6% from some other race, and 5.5% from two or more races. Hispanic or Latino residents of any race comprised 1.8% of the population, with the table below providing counts for each group.

Thirty-five point two percent of residents lived in urban areas, while 64.8% lived in rural areas.

There were 6,309 households in the county, of which 28.0% had children under the age of 18 living with them and 24.8% had a female householder with no spouse or partner present. About 31.1% of all households were made up of individuals and 15.3% had someone living alone who was 65 years of age or older.

There were 7,398 housing units, of which 14.7% were vacant. Among occupied housing units, 72.2% were owner-occupied and 27.8% were renter-occupied; the homeowner vacancy rate was 1.5% and the rental vacancy rate was 7.2%.

Macon County, Missouri – racial and ethnic composition Note: the US Census treats Hispanic/Latino as an ethnic category. This table excludes Latinos from the racial categories and assigns them to a separate category. Hispanics/Latinos may be of any race.
Race / ethnicity (NH = Non-Hispanic)	Pop 1980	Pop 1990	Pop 2000	Pop 2010	Pop 2020	% 1980	% 1990	% 2000	% 2010	% 2020
White alone (NH)	15,879	14,852	15,071	14,735	13,778	97.34%	96.79%	95.62%	94.66%	90.59%
Black or African American alone (NH)	305	363	347	349	299	1.87%	2.37%	2.20%	2.24%	1.97%
Native American or Alaska Native alone (NH)	11	50	60	30	25	0.07%	0.33%	0.38%	0.19%	0.16%
Asian alone (NH)	26	19	25	63	84	0.16%	0.12%	0.16%	0.40%	0.55%
Native Hawaiian or Pacific Islander alone (NH)	x	x	2	9	4	x	x	0.01%	0.06%	0.03%
Other race alone (NH)	7	2	15	8	37	0.04%	0.01%	0.10%	0.05%	0.24%
Mixed-race or multiracial (NH)	x	x	121	222	706	x	x	0.77%	1.43%	4.64%
Hispanic or Latino (any race)	85	59	121	150	276	0.52%	0.38%	0.77%	0.96%	1.81%
Total	16,313	15,345	15,762	15,566	15,209	100.00%	100.00%	100.00%	100.00%	100.00%

=== 2010 census ===
As of the census of 2010, there were 15,556 people, 6,501 households, and 4,381 families residing in the county. The population density was 20 people per square mile (7.7 people/km^{2}). There were 7,502 housing units at an average density of 9 units per square mile (3.5/km^{2}). The racial makeup of the county was 96.18% White, 2.21% Black or African American, 0.39% Native American, 0.16% Asian, 0.01% Pacific Islander, 0.22% from other races, and 0.83% from two or more races. Approximately 0.77% of the population were Hispanic or Latino of any race. 22.8% were of German, 21.8% American, 13.9% English and 10.8% Irish ancestry.

There were 6,501 households, out of which 29.10% had children under the age of 18 living with them, 55.70% were married couples living together, 8.40% had a female householder with no husband present, and 32.60% were non-families. 29.00% of all households were made up of individuals, and 15.00% had someone living alone who was 65 years of age or older. The average household size was 2.38 and the average family size was 2.92.

In the county, the population was spread out, with 24.20% under the age of 18, 7.50% from 18 to 24, 25.30% from 25 to 44, 23.90% from 45 to 64, and 19.00% who were 65 years of age or older. The median age was 40 years. For every 100 females there were 95.40 males. For every 100 females age 18 and over, there were 90.50 males.

The median income for a household in the county was $30,195, and the median income for a family was $36,370. Males had a median income of $26,408 versus $18,275 for females. The per capita income for the county was $16,189. About 8.30% of families and 12.50% of the population were below the poverty line, including 15.00% of those under age 18 and 13.10% of those age 65 or over.

== Communities ==
=== Cities ===
- Atlanta
- Bevier
- Callao
- Elmer
- Ethel
- La Plata
- Macon (county seat)
- New Cambria

=== Village ===
- South Gifford

=== Census-designated place ===
- Excello

=== Other unincorporated places ===
- Anabel
- Ardmore
- Axtell
- Barnesville
- Barryville
- Bloomington
- Cardy
- College Mound
- Cottage
- Cox
- Economy
- Goldsberry
- Hammack
- Kaseyville
- Kellogg
- Keota
- Kern
- Lingo
- Love Lake
- Mercyville
- Nickellton
- Redman
- Seney
- Sue City
- Ten Mile
- Walnut
- Woodville

=== Ghost towns ===
- Hart
- Longville
- Tullvania

== Education ==
=== Public schools ===
- Atlanta C-3 School District – Atlanta
  - Atlanta Elementary School (K-06)
  - Atlanta High School (07-12)
- Bevier C-4 School District – Bevier
  - Bevier Elementary School (K-08)
  - Bevier High School (09-12)
- Callao C-8 School District – Callao
  - Callao Elementary School (K-08)
- La Plata R-II School District – La Plata
  - La Plata Elementary School (PK-06)
  - La Plata High School (07-12)
- Macon County R-I School District – Macon
  - Macon Elementary School (PK-05)
  - Macon Middle School (06-08)
  - Macon High School (09-12)
- Macon County R-IV School District – New Cambria
  - Macon County Elementary School (K-06)
  - Macon County High School (07-12)

=== Private schools ===
- Tri County Christian School – Macon (PK-06) – Nondenominational Christian
- Immaculate Conception School – Macon (K-08) – Roman Catholic

=== Public libraries ===
- Laplata Public Library
- Macon Public Library

== Politics ==
=== Local ===
The accompanying table (below right) shows the county elected officials and their party affiliation. As is tradition, the majority ran as Republicans.

Macon County, Missouri

Elected countywide officials
Assessor	Alan Spencer	Democratic
Circuit Clerk	Twila Halley	Republican
County Clerk	Shirley Sims	Republican
Collector	Jeanette Ronchetto	Democratic
Commissioner (presiding)	Alan R. Wyatt	Republican
Commissioner (district 1)	Drew Belt	Republican
Commissioner (district 2)	Jon Dwiggins	Republican
Coroner	Brian Hayes	Republican
Prosecuting Attorney	Josh Meisner	Democratic
Public Administrator	Lois Noland	Democratic
Recorder	Sherry Muncy	Republican
Sheriff	Kevin Shoemaker	Democratic
Surveyor	John Schaefer	Republican
Treasurer	Krista Bruno	Republican

=== State ===
Past gubernatorial election results
Year	Republican	Democratic	Third parties
2024	81.35% 6,304	17.14% 1,328	1.51% 117
2020	78.18% 6,096	20.20% 1,575	1.62% 126
2016	66.92% 5,065	30.61% 2,315	2.43% 184
2012	54.45% 3,868	43.44% 3,086	2.11% 150
2008	57.16% 4,242	41.34% 3,068	1.49% 111
2004	61.48% 4,598	37.18% 2,781	1.36% 100
2000	51.10% 3,633	47.19% 3,355	1.71% 122
1996	32.08% 2,069	65.61% 4,231	2.31% 149

All of Macon County is in district 6 of the Missouri House of Representatives, represented by Tim Remole (R-Excello).

Missouri House of Representatives — District 6 — Macon County (2016)
Party	Candidate	Votes	%	±%
Republican	Tim Remole	6,682	100.00%	+27.91

Missouri House of Representatives — District 6 — Macon County (2014)
Party	Candidate	Votes	%	±%
Republican	Tim Remole	3,706	72.09%	+7.98
Democratic	Robert Harrington	1,435	27.91%	−7.98

Missouri House of Representatives — District 6 — Macon County (2012)
Party	Candidate	Votes	%	±%
Republican	Tim Remole	4,538	64.11%	
Democratic	Diane J. Scott	2,541	35.89%	

All of Macon County is a part of Missouri's 18th District in the Missouri Senate and is currently represented by Brian Munzingler (R-Williamstown).

Missouri Senate — District 18 — Macon County (2014)
Party	Candidate	Votes	%	±%
Republican	Brian Munzingler	4,221	100.00%	

=== Federal ===
U.S. Senate — Missouri — Macon County (2016)
Party	Candidate	Votes	%	±%
Republican	Roy Blunt	4,894	64.81%	+16.07
Democratic	Jason Kander	2,323	30.76%	−15.32
Libertarian	Jonathan Dine	150	1.99%	−3.19
Green	Johnathan McFarland	88	1.17%	+1.17
Constitution	Fred Ryman	96	1.27%	+1.27

U.S. Senate — Missouri — Macon County (2012)
Party	Candidate	Votes	%	±%
Republican	Todd Akin	3,444	48.74%	
Democratic	Claire McCaskill	3,256	46.08%	
Libertarian	Jonathan Dine	366	5.18%	

All of Macon County is included in Missouri's 6th Congressional District and is currently represented by Sam Graves (R-St. Tarkio) in the U.S. House of Representatives.

U.S. House of Representatives – Missouri’s 6th Congressional District – Macon County (2016)
Party	Candidate	Votes	%	±%
Republican	Sam Graves	5,688	75.95%	+2.54
Democratic	David M. Blackwell	1,573	21.00%	−2.88
Libertarian	Russ Lee Monchil	118	1.58%	−1.13
Green	Mike Diel	110	1.47%	+1.47

U.S. House of Representatives — Missouri's 6th Congressional District — Macon County (2014)
Party	Candidate	Votes	%	±%
Republican	Sam Graves	3,679	73.41%	+6.80
Democratic	Bill Hedge	1,197	23.88%	−7.80
Libertarian	Russ Lee Monchil	136	2.71%	+1.00

U.S. House of Representatives — Missouri's 6th Congressional District — Macon County (2012)
Party	Candidate	Votes	%	±%
Republican	Sam Graves	4,605	66.61%	
Democratic	Kyle Yarber	2,190	31.68%	
Libertarian	Russ Lee Monchil	118	1.71%	

=== Presidential election results ===
United States presidential election results for Macon County, Missouri
Year	Republican		Democratic		Third party(ies)	
Year	No.	%	No.	%	No.	%
1888	2,850	44.68%	3,293	51.63%	235	3.68%
1892	2,746	40.30%	3,284	48.19%	784	11.51%
1896	3,475	43.40%	4,473	55.87%	58	0.72%
1900	3,568	44.67%	4,174	52.25%	246	3.08%
1904	3,674	48.55%	3,604	47.63%	289	3.82%
1908	3,542	45.86%	3,919	50.74%	263	3.40%
1912	1,288	18.44%	3,610	51.68%	2,087	29.88%
1916	3,034	42.96%	3,805	53.87%	224	3.17%
1920	6,309	51.75%	5,626	46.15%	257	2.11%
1924	4,909	44.83%	5,538	50.58%	503	4.59%
1928	5,618	53.45%	4,838	46.03%	54	0.51%
1932	3,266	33.61%	6,370	65.55%	82	0.84%
1936	4,808	42.69%	6,417	56.98%	37	0.33%
1940	5,384	46.74%	6,120	53.13%	15	0.13%
1944	4,796	50.06%	4,772	49.81%	13	0.14%
1948	3,833	42.41%	5,193	57.45%	13	0.14%
1952	5,537	54.66%	4,577	45.19%	15	0.15%
1956	4,694	51.98%	4,337	48.02%	0	0.00%
1960	4,925	53.93%	4,208	46.07%	0	0.00%
1964	2,837	34.49%	5,389	65.51%	0	0.00%
1968	3,804	47.04%	3,462	42.81%	821	10.15%
1972	4,538	61.47%	2,844	38.53%	0	0.00%
1976	3,360	43.70%	4,296	55.88%	32	0.42%
1980	4,430	54.11%	3,578	43.70%	179	2.19%
1984	4,542	59.93%	3,037	40.07%	0	0.00%
1988	3,406	51.30%	3,215	48.43%	18	0.27%
1992	2,256	31.49%	3,194	44.58%	1,714	23.93%
1996	2,634	40.65%	2,937	45.32%	909	14.03%
2000	4,232	58.98%	2,817	39.26%	126	1.76%
2004	4,673	61.73%	2,856	37.73%	41	0.54%
2008	4,586	61.36%	2,784	37.25%	104	1.39%
2012	4,701	65.66%	2,309	32.25%	150	2.09%
2016	5,798	75.98%	1,548	20.29%	285	3.73%
2020	6,076	77.54%	1,662	21.21%	98	1.25%
2024	6,300	80.37%	1,481	18.89%	58	0.74%

== See also ==
- National Register of Historic Places listings in Macon County, Missouri
