= Brookfield, Missouri =

- City
- Location within Linn County (left) and Missouri (right)
- Coordinates: 39°47′07″N 93°04′38″W
- Country: United States
- State: Missouri
- County: Linn

Government
  - Mayor: Lonnie Trentham

Area
  - Total: 4.29 sq mi (11.11 km^{2})
  - Land: 4.27 sq mi (11.07 km^{2})
  - Water: 0.015 sq mi (0.04 km^{2})
- Elevation: 764 ft (233 m)

Population (2020)
  - Total: 4,111
  - Density: 961.8/sq mi (371.35/km^{2})
- Time zone: UTC-6 (Central (CST))
  - Summer (DST): UTC-5 (CDT)
- ZIP code: 64628
- Area code: 660
- FIPS code: 29-08650
- GNIS feature ID: 2393426
- Website: brookfieldcity.com

Brookfield is a city in Linn County, Missouri, United States. The population was 4,111 at the 2020 census.

== History ==
Brookfield was surveyed in 1859 by John Wood Brooks, a native of Boston. John Wood Brooks is further remembered by the names of four Brookfield streets: John, Wood, Brooks, and Boston streets. A post office called Brookfield has been in operation since 1860.

Brookfield was located along the first railroad built across the State of Missouri, completed by the Hannibal and St. Joseph Railroad on February 13, 1859. Passenger rail served the town for over a century. The last daytime train passed through the town on April 9, 1968, when the Kansas City Zephyr between Chicago and Kansas City was discontinued.

== Geography ==
According to the United States Census Bureau, the city has a total area of 4.29 square miles (11.11 km^{2}), of which 4.27 square miles (11.06 km^{2}) is land and 0.02 square miles (0.05 km^{2}) is water.

=== Climate ===
Climate data for Brookfield, Missouri (1991–2020 normals, extremes 1941–2018)
Month	Jan	Feb	Mar	Apr	May	Jun	Jul	Aug	Sep	Oct	Nov	Dec	Year
Record high °F (°C)	74 (23)	79 (26)	86 (30)	92 (33)	98 (37)	106 (41)	116 (47)	108 (42)	109 (43)	95 (35)	83 (28)	72 (22)	116 (47)
Mean maximum °F (°C)	57.3 (14.1)	65.4 (18.6)	76.5 (24.7)	83.2 (28.4)	86.5 (30.3)	92.4 (33.6)	96.1 (35.6)	96.6 (35.9)	91.0 (32.8)	84.0 (28.9)	72.0 (22.2)	60.4 (15.8)	98.2 (36.8)
Mean daily maximum °F (°C)	36.1 (2.3)	41.6 (5.3)	53.6 (12.0)	64.9 (18.3)	74.4 (23.6)	83.3 (28.5)	87.3 (30.7)	86.1 (30.1)	78.9 (26.1)	67.3 (19.6)	52.8 (11.6)	40.7 (4.8)	63.9 (17.7)
Daily mean °F (°C)	26.9 (−2.8)	31.5 (−0.3)	42.8 (6.0)	53.6 (12.0)	63.9 (17.7)	73.3 (22.9)	77.4 (25.2)	75.5 (24.2)	67.6 (19.8)	55.9 (13.3)	42.7 (5.9)	31.8 (−0.1)	53.6 (12.0)
Mean daily minimum °F (°C)	17.7 (−7.9)	21.5 (−5.8)	31.9 (−0.1)	42.2 (5.7)	53.5 (11.9)	63.4 (17.4)	67.4 (19.7)	64.9 (18.3)	56.3 (13.5)	44.5 (6.9)	32.7 (0.4)	22.9 (−5.1)	43.2 (6.2)
Mean minimum °F (°C)	−2.8 (−19.3)	0.3 (−17.6)	12.5 (−10.8)	26.0 (−3.3)	39.2 (4.0)	49.6 (9.8)	56.4 (13.6)	54.1 (12.3)	38.9 (3.8)	28.3 (−2.1)	15.6 (−9.1)	0.0 (−17.8)	−9.4 (−23.0)
Record low °F (°C)	−21 (−29)	−18 (−28)	−15 (−26)	13 (−11)	29 (−2)	41 (5)	46 (8)	43 (6)	27 (−3)	16 (−9)	−7 (−22)	−24 (−31)	−24 (−31)
Average precipitation inches (mm)	1.50 (38)	1.82 (46)	2.90 (74)	3.95 (100)	5.53 (140)	5.49 (139)	4.92 (125)	4.37 (111)	3.99 (101)	3.43 (87)	2.52 (64)	1.80 (46)	42.22 (1,072)
Average snowfall inches (cm)	4.8 (12)	5.9 (15)	2.5 (6.4)	0.2 (0.51)	0.0 (0.0)	0.0 (0.0)	0.0 (0.0)	0.0 (0.0)	0.0 (0.0)	0.1 (0.25)	1.2 (3.0)	4.2 (11)	18.9 (48)
Average precipitation days (≥ 0.01 in)	7.2	7.5	9.5	11.6	12.5	11.4	9.6	8.8	7.7	8.7	7.9	7.4	109.8
Average snowy days (≥ 0.1 in)	3.1	2.8	1.4	0.1	0.0	0.0	0.0	0.0	0.0	0.0	0.7	2.9	11.0
Source: NOAA (mean maxima/minima 1981–2010)

== Demographics ==
Historical population
Census	Pop.	Note	%±
1870	402		—
1880	2,264		463.2%
1890	4,547		100.8%
1900	5,484		20.6%
1910	5,749		4.8%
1920	6,304		9.7%
1930	6,428		2.0%
1940	6,174		−4.0%
1950	5,810		−5.9%
1960	5,694		−2.0%
1970	5,491		−3.6%
1980	5,555		1.2%
1990	4,888		−12.0%
2000	4,769		−2.4%
2010	4,542		−4.8%
2020	4,111		−9.5%
U.S. Decennial Census

=== 2020 census ===
As of the 2020 census, Brookfield had a population of 4,111. The median age was 41.8 years. 22.3% of residents were under the age of 18 and 22.9% of residents were 65 years of age or older. For every 100 females there were 91.1 males, and for every 100 females age 18 and over there were 87.4 males age 18 and over.

94.1% of residents lived in urban areas, while 5.9% lived in rural areas.

There were 1,790 households in Brookfield, of which 26.6% had children under the age of 18 living in them. Of all households, 37.7% were married-couple households, 21.2% were households with a male householder and no spouse or partner present, and 32.3% were households with a female householder and no spouse or partner present. About 37.7% of all households were made up of individuals and 18.1% had someone living alone who was 65 years of age or older.

There were 2,130 housing units, of which 16.0% were vacant. The homeowner vacancy rate was 4.1% and the rental vacancy rate was 8.0%.

Racial composition as of the 2020 census
Race	Number	Percent
White	3,795	92.3%
Black or African American	37	0.9%
American Indian and Alaska Native	17	0.4%
Asian	12	0.3%
Native Hawaiian and Other Pacific Islander	1	0.0%
Some other race	44	1.1%
Two or more races	205	5.0%
Hispanic or Latino (of any race)	131	3.2%

=== 2010 census ===
As of the census of 2010, there were 4,542 people, 1,892 households, and 1,146 families living in the city. The population density was 1,063.7 inhabitants per square mile (410.7/km^{2}). There were 2,280 housing units at an average density of 534.0 per square mile (206.2/km^{2}). The racial makeup of the city was 95.4% White, 1.3% African American, 0.3% Native American, 0.3% Asian, 0.6% from other races, and 2.1% from two or more races. Hispanic or Latino of any race were 2.0% of the population.

There were 1,892 households, of which 30.8% had children under the age of 18 living with them, 43.3% were married couples living together, 12.5% had a female householder with no husband present, 4.7% had a male householder with no wife present, and 39.4% were non-families. 34.5% of all households were made up of individuals, and 16.4% had someone living alone who was 65 years of age or older. The average household size was 2.32 and the average family size was 2.96.

The median age in the city was 40.6 years. 25.8% of residents were under the age of 18; 7.1% were between the ages of 18 and 24; 21.6% were from 25 to 44; 25.1% were from 45 to 64; and 20.5% were 65 years of age or older. The gender makeup of the city was 45.9% male and 54.1% female.

=== 2000 census ===
As of the census of 2000, there were 4,769 people, 2,058 households, and 1,234 families living in the city. The population density was 1,110.2 inhabitants per square mile (428.7/km^{2}). There were 2,394 housing units at an average density of 557.3 per square mile (215.2/km^{2}). The racial makeup of the city was 96.94% White, 1.26% African American, 0.36% Native American, 0.15% Asian, 0.13% from other races, and 1.17% from two or more races. Hispanic or Latino of any race were 0.94% of the population.

There were 2,058 households, out of which 27.2% had children under the age of 18 living with them, 44.8% were married couples living together, 11.4% had a female householder with no husband present, and 40.0% were non-families. 35.3% of all households were made up of individuals, and 20.7% had someone living alone who was 65 years of age or older. The average household size was 2.23 and the average family size was 2.86.

In the city, the population was spread out, with 24.1% under the age of 18, 7.2% from 18 to 24, 23.1% from 25 to 44, 20.8% from 45 to 64, and 24.9% who were 65 years of age or older. The median age was 42 years. For every 100 females, there were 83.4 males. For every 100 females age 18 and over, there were 77.9 males.

The median income for a household in the city was $25,753, and the median income for a family was $32,385. Males had a median income of $23,284 versus $19,004 for females. The per capita income for the city was $14,842. About 14.7% of families and 19.1% of the population were below the poverty line, including 28.7% of those under age 18 and 14.8% of those age 65 or over.

== Education ==
Brookfield R-III School District operates one elementary school, one middle school, Brookfield High School, and Brookfield Area Career Center.

The town has a lending library, the Brookfield Public Library.

== Media ==
=== Newspapers ===
- Linn County Leader

=== Radio ===
- KFMZ 1470, AM
- KZBK 96.9, FM

== Arts and culture ==
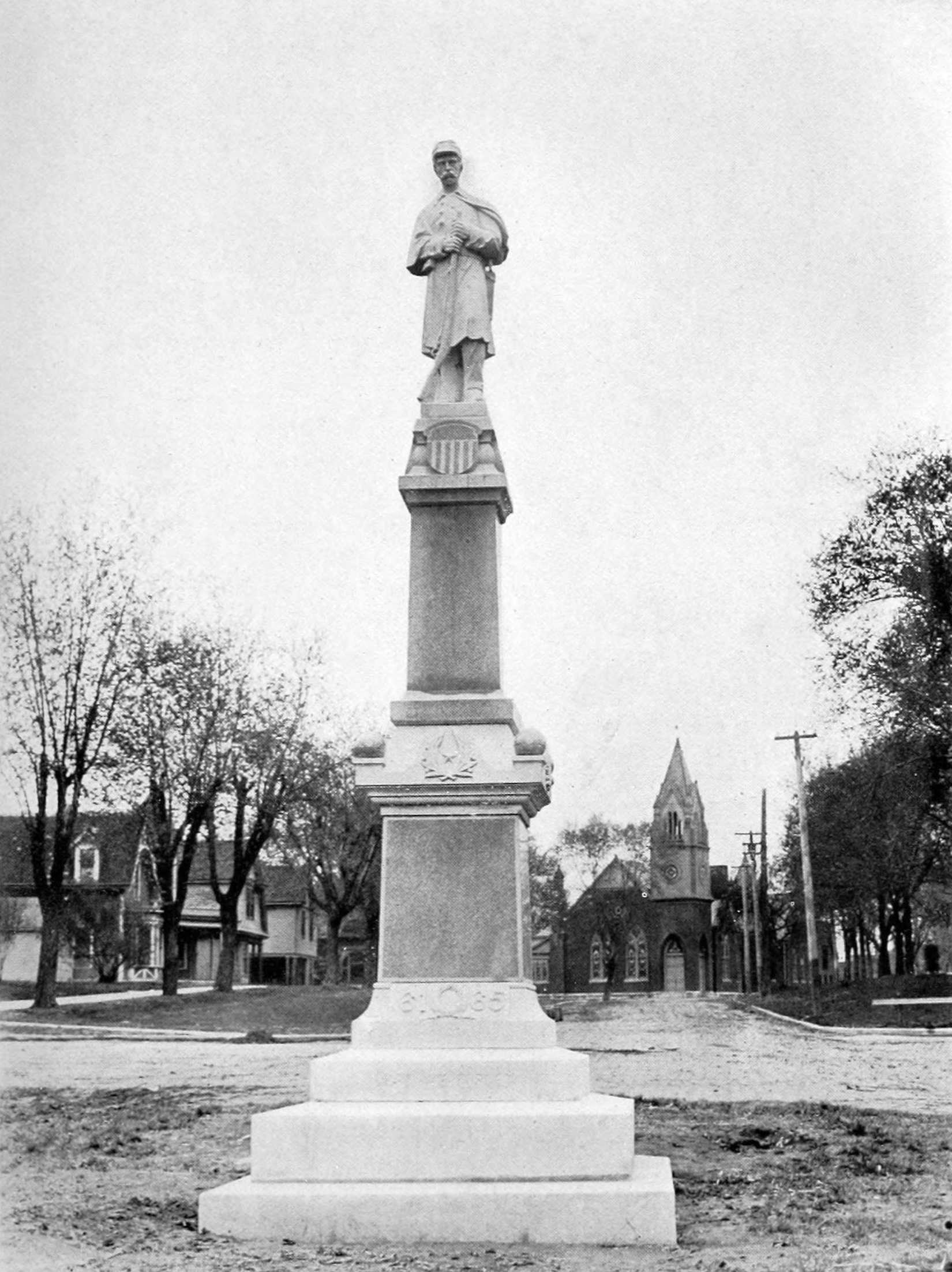
Brookfield Civil War Monument

Every Labor Day weekend, Brookfield hosts the Great Pershing Balloon Derby. Every fall the Brookfield Bulldogs play the Marceline Tigers in the annual Bell Game which is one of the oldest high school football rivalries in the United States. The Bell Game won a USA Today national contest for the nations best football rivalry in 2012. The Bell Game rivalry received 1,761,878 votes and won a $10,000 prize divided equally between Brookfield and Marceline.

Every year Brookfield hosts Twin Parks Summer Festival, a festival that takes place in the Twin Parks and on Main Street. The Twin Parks Summer Festival marks the start of summer for families in and around Brookfield, with activities including craft vendors, a baby contest, games, and a concert on Main Street featuring prominent acts.

== Notable people ==
- Doris Akers, gospel singer and composer, was born in Brookfield and resided there until age five.
- Virgil Blossom, Superintendent of Schools of the Little Rock School District during the Little Rock Nine, was born in Brookfield in 1906.
- Caleb Hearon, comedian, actor, and writer
- George W. Martin (1838–1921), member of the Missouri House of Representatives
- Don Pratt, the highest-ranking Allied officer killed on D-Day, was born in Brookfield in 1892.
- Howard A. Rusk, prominent physician and founder of the Rusk Institute of Rehabilitation Medicine, was born in Brookfield in 1901.
- Nellie Showalter, an early women's chess champion, was born in Brookfield in 1870.
- Dorothy C. Stratton, the first woman to be commissioned an officer in U.S. Coast Guard, was born in Brookfield in 1899.
- Dick Cochran, discus thrower
