= Kirksville micropolitan area, Missouri =

Coordinates: 40.20°N 92.54°W

Kirksville, MO micropolitan area
- Micropolitan Statistical Area
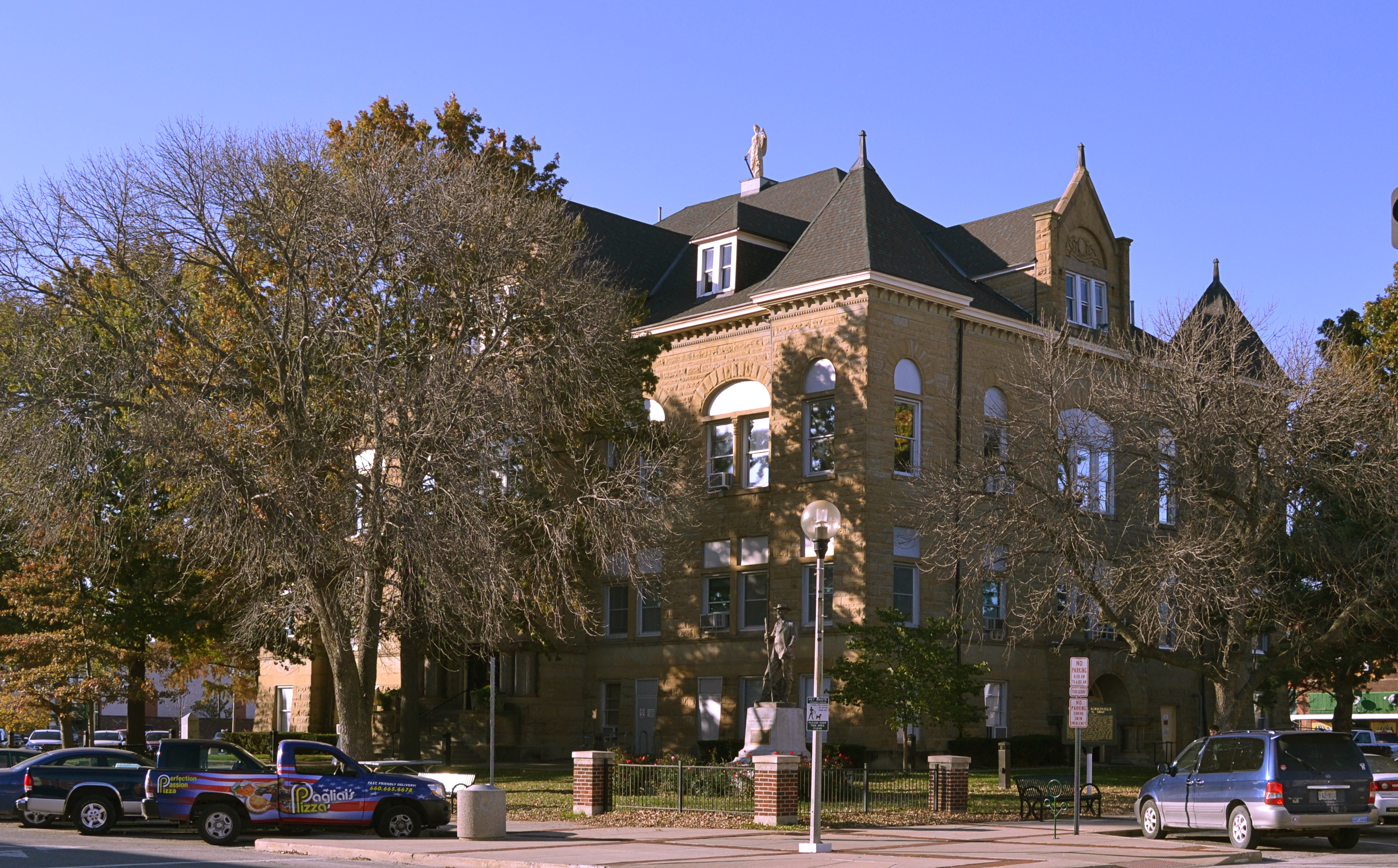
- Adair County Courthouse
Interactive Map of Kirksville, MO μSA
City of Kirksville
Kirksville, MO μSA
- Country: United States
- State: Missouri
- Principal city: Kirksville
- Time zone: UTC-6 (CST)
  - Summer (DST): UTC-5 (CDT)

The Kirksville Micropolitan Statistical Area, as defined by the United States Census Bureau, is an area consisting of two counties in Missouri, anchored by the city of Kirksville. As of the 2000 census, the μSA had a population of 29,147, and in the 2010 census the population was 30,008.

== Counties ==
- Adair
- Schuyler

== Communities ==
=== Places more than 15,000 inhabitants ===
- Kirksville (Principal city) Pop: 17,505

=== Places less than 1,000 inhabitants ===
- Lancaster Pop: 728
- Queen City Pop: 598
- Novinger Pop: 456
- Greentop Pop: 442
- Downing Pop: 335
- Brashear Pop: 273
- Glenwood Pop: 196
- Gibbs Pop: 107
- Millard Pop: 89

=== Unincorporated places ===
- Coatsville
- Yarrow

== Townships ==
=== Adair County ===
- Benton
- Clay
- Liberty
- Morrow
- Nineveh
- Pettis
- Polk
- Salt River
- Walnut
- Wilson

=== Schuyler County ===
- Chariton
- Fabius
- Glenwood
- Independence
- Liberty
- Prairie
- Salt River

== Demographics ==
As of the census of 2000, there were 29,147 people, 11,394 households, and 6,539 families residing within the μSA. The racial makeup of the μSA was 96.19% White, 1.03% African American, 0.26% Native American, 1.21% Asian, 0.04% Pacific Islander, 0.38% from other races, and 0.87% from two or more races. Hispanic or Latino of any race were 1.17% of the population.

The median income for a household in the μSA was $27,031, and the median income for a family was $36,325. Males had a median income of $25,974 versus $20,283 for females. The per capita income for the μSA was $15,667.

== Education ==
There are five public school districts that serve the micropolitan area:

- Adair County R-I (Novinger) (K-12)
- Adair County R-II (Brashear) (K-12)
- Kirksville R-III (K-12)
- La Plata R-II (La Plata) (K-12) **Serves a small portion of southern Adair County, though the school district facilities are in Macon County, Missouri.
- Schuyler County R-1 (K-12)

== See also ==
- Missouri census statistical areas
- United States micropolitan area
