= Iowa and St. Louis Railway =

The Iowa and St. Louis Railway (I&SL) was a subsidiary United States railroad operating in south-east Iowa and north-east Missouri from 1902 to 1947. For most of its existence it was part of the Chicago, Burlington and Quincy Railroad (CBQ), familiarly known as the Burlington System.

== History ==
=== Background ===
The I&SL was promoted in 1900 in order to exploit seams of coal existing along the Chariton River, historically known as the Novinger Coalfield. There was no railroad following the river valley, and it was hoped that building one which did would encourage the sinking of more coal mines.

The Quincy, Missouri and Pacific Railroad (QM&P) had opened from the Mississippi River crossing at Quincy, Illinois to Trenton in 1881. This passed through the town of Novinger which had been founded in 1878, and where the first coal mine was sunk in 1883 in response to the arrival of the railroad.

The QM&P went bankrupt in 1886, and was re-cast as the Quincy, Omaha and Kansas City Railway (QO&KC). The Omaha, Kansas City and Eastern Railroad (OKC&E) extended the line in 1897 from Trenton to Pattonsburg, Missouri for a connection to Omaha via the Missouri, Iowa, and Nebraska Railway which later became part of the Wabash Railroad.

The OKC&E was an affiliate of the Kansas City, Pittsburgh & Gulf Railroad until the latter's bankruptcy in 1899. The KCP&G was owned by Arthur Stilwell and was a predecessor of the Kansas City Southern Railway (KCS), which came into being after Stilwell was ejected and the company reconstructed in 1899.

From Pattonsburg to Smithville was built by the Kansas City and Northern Connecting Railroad in 1898, and from Smithville to Kansas City in the following year by the Kansas City and Atlantic Railroad. These lines were formally consolidated as the QO&KC (the OK Line or Quincy Route) in 1902 after further insolvency.

=== Initiation ===
The I&SL project was initiated by three employees of the QO&KC which was, at the time, operating the circuitous route between Quincy and Kansas City via Pattonsburg, Missouri as from 1898. The three were W.S. McCaull, claim agent for the QO&KC, H.F. Reddig the company's chief clerk, and H.H. Kendrick the auditor. Despite their status as employees of the QO&KC, the three founded a new railroad company on their own behalf on 11 May 1901.

Despite being very short of funds, the three managed to build a demonstration line of about five miles to Shibleys Point, heading north from the end of a mine spur owned by the Kansas City Midland Coal Company, which in its turn had a junction with the QO&KC at Novinger.

The project was presented with a wider scope, that of building a trunk line from Des Moines, Iowa to St Louis via the coalfield.

=== Construction ===
Funding for the project came from two sources. Investors in the KCS took note of the business potential of the I&SL as a feeder to their line at Kansas City via the QO&KC route, and thus began investing in the company from later in 1901. However, the Gates-Keefe-Lambert Syndicate of St. Louis and Chicago acquired a controlling interest in the same period.

The investment allowed for the quick construction of a line north to Centerville, Iowa where a junction was made with the Chicago, Rock Island and Pacific (CRIP) railroad at a point called "Summit". Now the QO&KC, about to go bankrupt, had supported the I&SL as a valuable feeder for coal traffic, up to the point where the latter made connection with the CRIP and so was in a position to steal coal traffic from the QO&KC at Novinger. The I&SL was vulnerable, because it relied upon the line of the Kansas City Midland Coal Company line to get to Novinger. So, officials of the QO&KC blocked the connection by force and had a confrontation with I&SL construction crews, which led to members of the latter being arrested and put under bond.

The situation was sorted out in March 1903 when the CBQ bought out the shareholders of the I&SL, and formally merged the company in 1905. The QO&KC, which had gone bankrupt in 1902, wasn't going to argue with the CBQ -and was itself bought out in 1908, although it remained as a wholly owned subsidiary of the CBQ until 1939 when its line was abandoned and the company dissolved.

=== Reconstruction ===
The I&SL was built predominantly of 66 lbs (30 kg) rail or lighter, and was operated by small steam engines.

Immediately on obtaining ownership, the CBQ ordered an upgrade which involved closing and re-laying the line between Sedan in Iowa and Novinger. The line between Sedan and Centerville was abandoned as redundant. Also an extension was constructed between Novinger and Elmer, Missouri, into more coal-bearing land in Adair County, Missouri but stopping short a few thousand feet short from intersecting the Atchison, Topeka and Santa Fe Railway (ATSF) main line through northern Missouri. The terminus was named after Elmer on the ATSF, but was actually in Mercyville which Elmer had supplanted when the ATSF built a station there.

The I&SF was henceforward operated by the CBQ as an off-branch of the QO&KC.

=== Proposed extension ===
However, the CBQ did not immediately abandon the intention of the original promoters to reach St Louis. It began work on an extension from Elmer across the ATSF to Macon with stations at Barnesville and Bloomington, then from Macon through Enterprise and Woodlawn in the direction of Holliday. The ultimate destination would have been Mexico, and a connection with its line there to St Louis. None of this was completed.

=== Decline ===
The decline of the I&SL was rapid. As public subsidies for highways and buses/trucks became substantial in the 1920s, the freight and passenger businesses were quickly drained away. Coal mines became difficult to operate in the area due to mine flooding and the costs of pumping excessive water, and due to thin seams of coal. Higher labor costs were a product of mine unionization activity but, in fairness to the miners, the jobs were dirty, hazardous and under-paid when one considers the lengthy hours worked and the accident rates.

On September 23, 1936 the Interstate Commerce Commission gave approval for the I&SL to cease operations from Elmer to South Gifford, and from Novinger to Sedan where coal mining had ceased. This did not mark the end of the passenger service, which continued on the stub from Novinger to South Gifford.

In 1939, the QO&KC was abandoned west of Milan, and the company dissolved. The CBQ took direct ownership of the remaining line from Quincy to Milan, via Novinger.

In 1942, most of the surviving line was abandoned, apart from a short section from Novinger accessing the spur leading to the Baiotto Mine of the Billy Creek Coal Company. This was to be the last mine operating in the coalfield, closing in 1966, and it was sending most of its output to the city power plant of Kirksville. Operations were on a call and demand basis, meaning that the mine manager would phone CBQ Control if and when a pick-up was needed. This meant that the arrangement could be terminated by mutual agreement, and was no longer a statutory common carrier service.

In 1947 the CBQ and the coal company agreed to terminate the service, the last segment of the I&SL to the coal mine was abandoned and the tracks were removed.

== Remains ==
A few of the former depots survive to this day, some being converted for other uses. An example of this is a private home in Yarrow. The South Gifford depot still stands but is in very poor condition. Despite decades of overgrowth, aerial images still reveal some segments of the former I&SL track bed.

== Operations ==
=== Freight ===
Freight on the line was always dominated by coal, for which the line was built. It came from underground mines at Connelsville, Mendota, Yarrow, and Youngstown in Missouri, and in the Coal City and Exline area in southern Iowa.

Other business included a cucumber pickling plant at Worthington, Missouri, and farm shipments from Livonia, Worthington, and from the Elmer, Missouri area.

=== Passengers ===
Passenger service was also available on the line until 1936. In February 1926, for example, the CBQ's public timetable had the Sedan to Elmer service as "Table 33a". This featured a mixed train (that is, a freight pick-up service with a passenger coach attached) starting from Elmer at 5:10 in the early morning, reaching Sedan at 9:00 and then returning at 9:20 to arrive back at Elmer at 12:40. The journey between the termini took 3 hours 20 minutes, an average speed of 15.6 mph (25.1 km/h).

This service continued, albeit truncated, when the line was reduced to Novinger - South Gifford.

=== Adair County Railroad ===
Apart from private spurs to coal mines, a single off-branch from the line existed, called the Adair County Railroad. This had been incorporated in 1904 to build six miles (9.7 km) of line to coal mines from Youngstown, and was a little subsidiary of the CBQ. The local name for the tap line of this outfit was "the Spur Up Billy's Creek". The line ran north-west from Youngstown.

== Route ==
The original northern terminus of the railroad was Centerville, where a junction had been made with the Chicago, Rock Island and Pacific Railroad. From there, the line ran closely parallel to the CBQ to Sedan. The companion line here was the Keokuk and Western Railroad, which became part of the CBQ in 1901. The I&SL line between Centerville and Sedan was abandoned as redundant in 1903.

From Sedan, the line ran to Coal City, Iowa before crossing the state line into Missouri. Passenger stops after that were Livonia, Mapleton, Worthington, Hilberton, Connelsville and Novinger. At the last named place, the QO&KC line was crossed and the two lines shared a station. Then came Youngstown, Yarrow, South Gifford and finally the terminus at Elmer.

Elmer also had the main line of the Atchison, Topeka and Santa Fe Railway, but the lines did not connect and the two stations were a mile apart.
