= Lick Skillet =

Lick Skillet or Lickskillet may refer to:

- Lickskillet, Kentucky (disambiguation), several places
- Lickskillet, Missouri, an unincorporated community
- Lick Skillet, Tennessee, an unincorporated community in Decatur County
- Lick Skillet, Virginia, an unincorporated community in Smyth County

== See also ==
- Lick Skillet Railroad Work Station Historic District
