= Chariton Township =

Chariton Township may refer to the following American townships:

- Chariton Township, Appanoose County, Iowa
- Chariton Township, Chariton County, Missouri
- Chariton Township, Howard County, Missouri
- Chariton Township, Macon County, Missouri
- Chariton Township, Randolph County, Missouri
- Chariton Township, Schuyler County, Missouri
