= Greentop, Missouri =

City in Adair County, Missouri, United States

- City
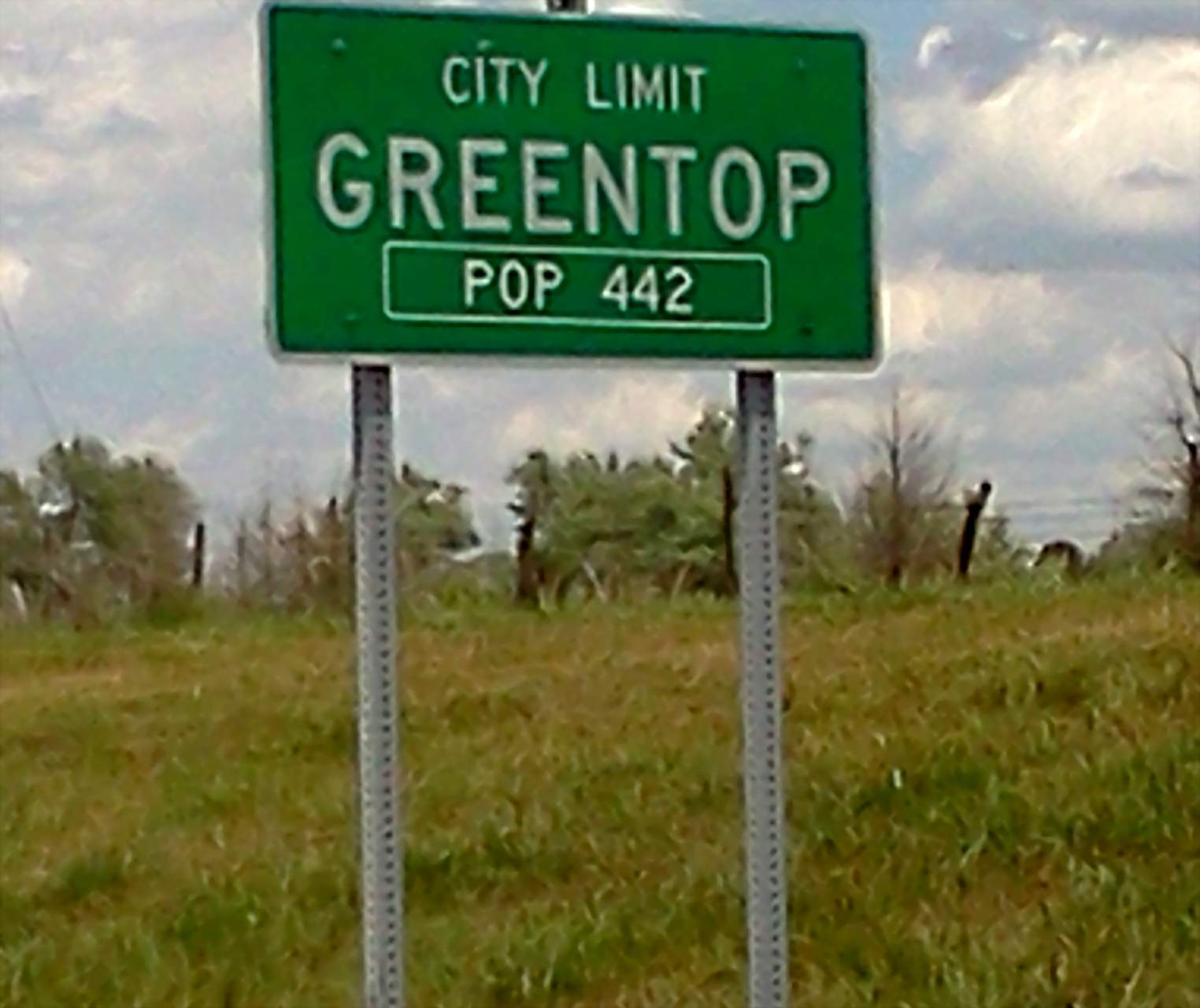
- City limits sign

- Location within Schuyler County (left) and Missouri (right)
- Coordinates: 40°21′03″N 92°33′56″W
- Country: United States
- State: Missouri
- Counties: Schuyler, Adair
- Townships: Salt River, Polk
- Incorporated: 1867

Area
  - Total: 0.82 sq mi (2.12 km^{2})
  - Land: 0.82 sq mi (2.12 km^{2})
  - Water: 0 sq mi (0.00 km^{2})
- Elevation: 984 ft (300 m)

Population (2020)
  - Total: 388
  - Density: 474.9/sq mi (183.36/km^{2})
- Time zone: UTC-6 (Central (CST))
  - Summer (DST): UTC-5 (CDT)
- ZIP code: 63546
- Area code: 660
- FIPS code: 29-29422
- GNIS feature ID: 2394993

Greentop is a city in Adair and Schuyler counties in Missouri, United States. As of the 2020 census, its population was 388.

== History ==
Greentop is considered one of the oldest communities in Schuyler County, with its first settlement in the early 1840s. However, the town layout was not documented until 1855. A U.S. Post Office was established in 1857, and the town was finally incorporated in February 1867.

== Geography ==
Greentop is located at 40°20′54″N 92°34′2″W (40.348360, -92.567281). According to the United States Census Bureau, the city has a total area of 0.82 square miles (2.12 km^{2}), all land. A residential portion lies in Adair County while the majority of the town, including the business district, is in Schuyler County.

== Demographics ==
Historical population
Census	Pop.	Note	%±
1880	220		—
1890	263		19.5%
1900	284		8.0%
1910	275		−3.2%
1920	289		5.1%
1930	268		−7.3%
1940	254		−5.2%
1950	281		10.6%
1960	311		10.7%
1970	351		12.9%
1980	538		53.3%
1990	425		−21.0%
2000	427		0.5%
2010	442		3.5%
2020	388		−12.2%
U.S. Decennial Census

Greentop is part of the Kirksville Micropolitan Statistical Area.

=== 2010 census ===
As of the census of 2010, there were 442 people, 199 households, and 130 families living in the city. The population density was 539.0 inhabitants per square mile (208.1/km^{2}). There were 222 housing units at an average density of 270.7 per square mile (104.5/km^{2}). The racial makeup of the city was 98.9% White, 0.7% Asian, 0.2% from other races, and 0.2% from two or more races. Hispanic or Latino of any race were 0.9% of the population.

There were 199 households, of which 26.6% had children under the age of 18 living with them, 51.3% were married couples living together, 11.1% had a female householder with no husband present, 3.0% had a male householder with no wife present, and 34.7% were non-families. 30.7% of all households were made up of individuals, and 11% had someone living alone who was 65 years of age or older. The average household size was 2.22 and the average family size was 2.75.

The median age in the city was 41.5 years. 22.4% of residents were under the age of 18; 7.8% were between the ages of 18 and 24; 23.2% were from 25 to 44; 28.8% were from 45 to 64; and 18.1% were 65 years of age or older. The gender makeup of the city was 48.0% male and 52.0% female.

=== 2000 census ===
As of the census of 2000, there were 427 people, 190 households, and 126 families living in the city. The population density was 521.4 inhabitants per square mile (201.3/km^{2}). There were 221 housing units at an average density of 269.9 per square mile (104.2/km^{2}). The racial makeup of the city was 97.89% White, 0.23% Native American, 0.94% Asian, and 0.94% from two or more races. Hispanic or Latino of any race were 0.94% of the population.

There were 190 households, out of which 31.1% had children under the age of 18 living with them, 55.3% were married couples living together, 9.5% had a female householder with no husband present, and 33.2% were non-families. 31.1% of all households were made up of individuals, and 16.8% had someone living alone who was 65 years of age or older. The average household size was 2.25 and the average family size was 2.76.

In the city, the population was spread out, with 21.8% under the age of 18, 7.7% from 18 to 24, 25.5% from 25 to 44, 28.6% from 45 to 64, and 16.4% who were 65 years of age or older. The median age was 42 years. For every 100 females, there were 91.5 males. For every 100 females age 18 and over, there were 88.7 males.

The median income for a household in the city was $21,953, and the median income for a family was $37,750. Males had a median income of $21,875 versus $19,250 for females. The per capita income for the city was $15,757. About 13.9% of families and 17.5% of the population were below the poverty line, including 18.8% of those under age 18 and 27.7% of those age 65 or over.

== Education ==
All of Schuyler County is in the Schuyler County R-I School District.

The portion of Greentop in Adair County is within the Kirksville R-III School District.

== Notable people ==
- Rhonda Vincent—Multi-award-winning Bluegrass music star.

== Photo gallery ==
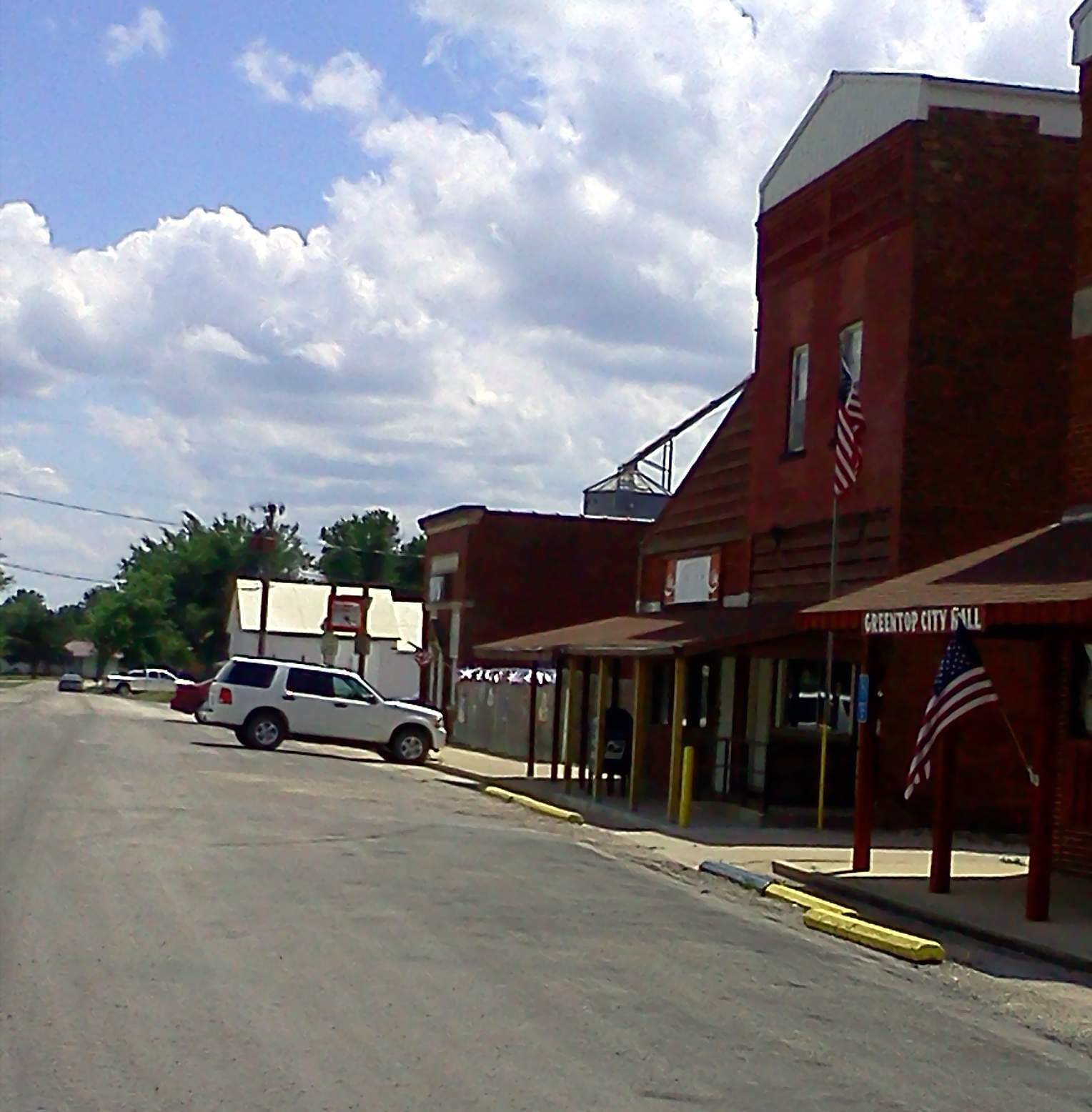
A portion of the Greentop downtown business district.

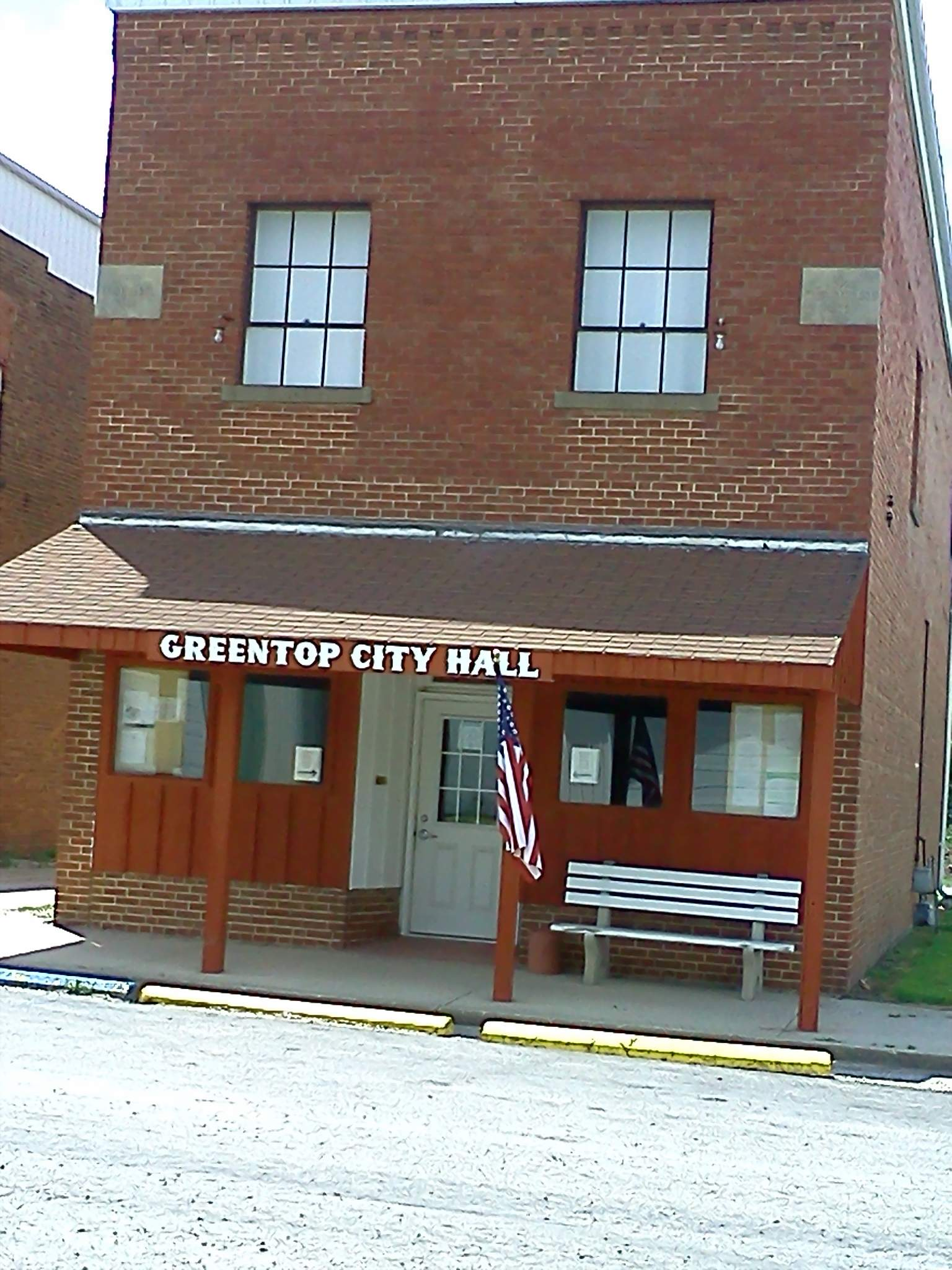
Greentop City Hall.

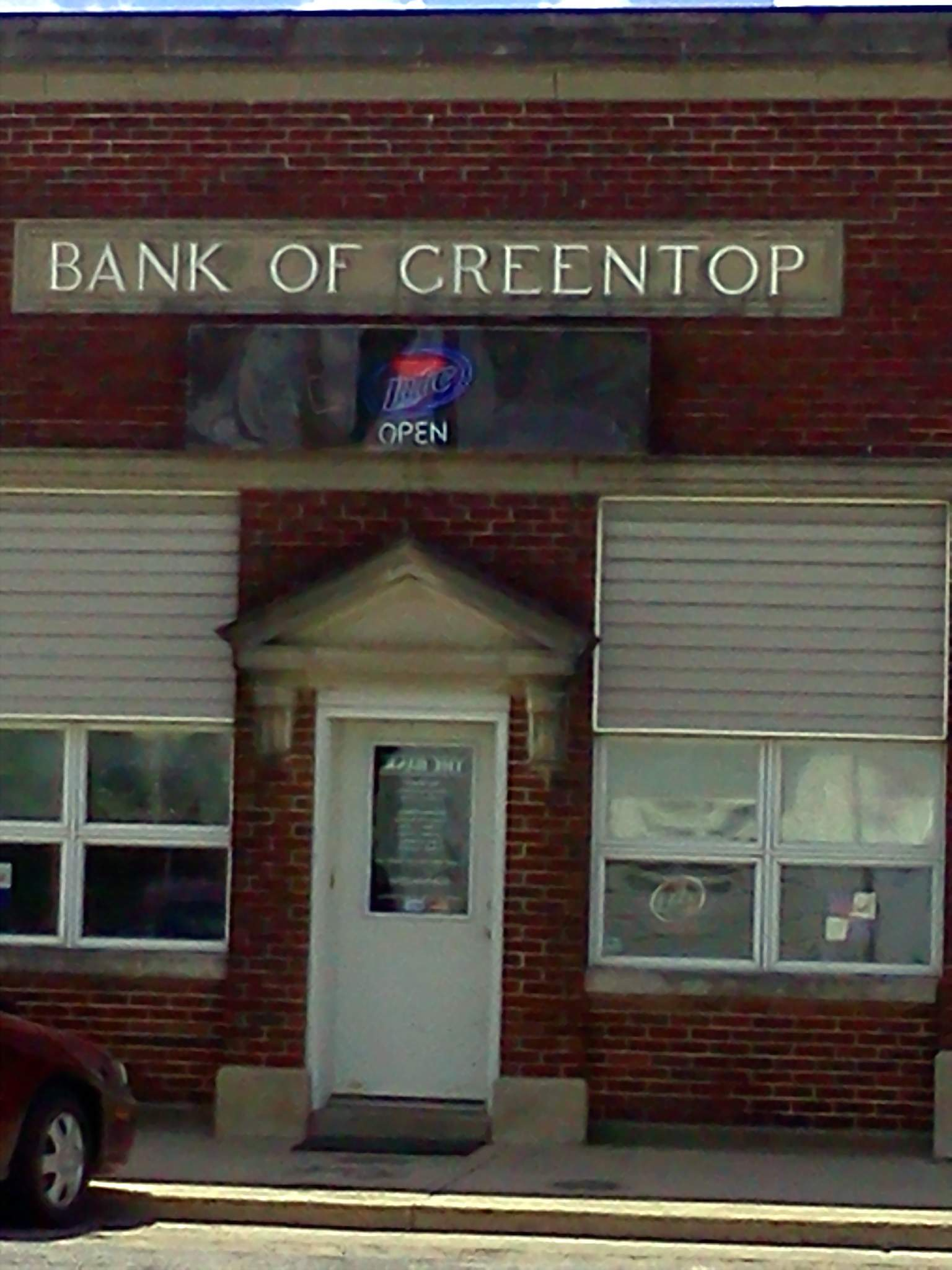
Bank of Greentop building, now repurposed as a social club.

== See also ==
- List of cities in Missouri
