= Benton Township, Adair County, Missouri =

Benton Township, Missouri
- Township
- Coordinates: 40°11′41″N 092°34′49″W
- Country: United States
- State: Missouri
- County: Adair

Area
  - Total: 80.3 sq mi (207.9 km^{2})
  - Land: 79.2 sq mi (205.2 km^{2})
  - Water: 1.0 sq mi (2.6 km^{2}) 1.27%
- Elevation: 980 ft (300 m)

Population (2010)
  - Total: 19,700
  - Density: 250/sq mi (96/km^{2})
- FIPS code: 29-04546
- GNIS feature ID: 0766210

Benton Township is one of ten townships in Adair County, Missouri, United States. As of the 2010 census, its population was 19,700. It is named for Thomas Hart Benton, one of the inaugural pair of U.S. senators from Missouri.

== Geography ==
Benton Township covers an area of 80.26 square miles (207.9 km^{2}) and contains one incorporated settlement, Kirksville (the county seat). It is home to twelve cemeteries: Bear Creek, Cater, Collett, Forest-Llewellyn, Highland Park, Maple Hills, Oak Grove, Ownbey, Park View Memorial Gardens, Prough, Sloans Point and Waddill.

The streams of Billy Creek, Dave Branch, Gill Branch and Willis Branch run through the township.

== Transportation ==
Benton Township contains a heliport for medical ambulance Air Evac Lifeteam, and another heliport is located at Northeast Regional Medical Center. Major highways in Benton Township include U.S. Highway 63, Missouri Highway 6, and Missouri Highway 11.

== Education ==
Benton Township contains A.T. Still University, Truman State University, and the Kirksville campus of Moberly Area Community College. Primary and secondary education is provided by Kirksville R-III School District for the majority of Benton Township residents. However, a number in the western area attend Adair County R-1 in Novinger.
