= Paultown, Missouri =

Unincorporated community in Missouri, U.S.

Paultown
- Unincorporated community
- Location of Paultown in Missouri
- Coordinates: 40°09′38″N 92°21′54″W
- Country: United States
- State: Missouri
- County: Adair County
- Time zone: UTC-6 (Central Standard Time)
  - Summer (DST): UTC-5 (Central Daylight Time)

Paultown (also known as Paulville) is an unincorporated community in eastern Adair County, in the U.S. state of Missouri. The community was approximately one mile northeast of Brashear and the Paultown Cemetery is about one-half mile to the east above Big Deer Branch.

== History ==
Paultown (Paulville) was platted in the 1850s by Walker Paul, and named for him. A post office called Paulville was established in 1857, and remained in operation until 1873.
