= Hurdland, Missouri =

- City
- Location of Hurdland, Missouri
- Coordinates: 40°8′58″N 92°18′9″W
- Country: United States
- State: Missouri
- County: Knox

Area
  - Total: 0.33 sq mi (0.86 km^{2})
  - Land: 0.33 sq mi (0.86 km^{2})
  - Water: 0 sq mi (0.00 km^{2})
- Elevation: 889 ft (271 m)

Population (2020)
  - Total: 155
  - Density: 465.7/sq mi (179.82/km^{2})
- Time zone: UTC-6 (Central (CST))
  - Summer (DST): UTC-5 (CDT)
- ZIP code: 63547
- Area code: 660
- FIPS code: 29-33904
- GNIS feature ID: 0720028
- Website: cityofhurdland.wordpress.com

Hurdland is a city in Knox County, Missouri, United States. As of the 2020 census, its population was 155.

== History ==
Hurdland was platted in 1872 when the railroad was extended to that point.

The community was named after John Hurd, the original owner of the town site. A post office has been in operation at Hurdland since 1872.

== Geography ==
The community is located on Missouri Route 6 approximately 6.5 miles west of Edina and four miles east of Brashear in adjacent Adair County.

According to the United States Census Bureau, the city has a total area of 0.33 square miles (0.85 km^{2}), all land.

== Demographics ==
Historical population
Census	Pop.	Note	%±
1880	108		—
1890	248		129.6%
1900	322		29.8%
1910	323		0.3%
1920	325		0.6%
1930	280		−13.8%
1940	311		11.1%
1950	268		−13.8%
1960	205		−23.5%
1970	225		9.8%
1980	227		0.9%
1990	212		−6.6%
2000	239		12.7%
2010	163		−31.8%
2020	155		−4.9%
U.S. Decennial Census

=== 2010 census ===
As of the census of 2010, there were 163 people, 75 households, and 41 families residing in the city. The population density was 493.9 inhabitants per square mile (190.7/km^{2}). There were 94 housing units at an average density of 284.8 per square mile (110.0/km^{2}). The racial makeup of the city was 97.5% White and 2.5% from two or more races. Hispanic or Latino of any race were 0.6% of the population.

There were 75 households, of which 25.3% had children under the age of 18 living with them, 42.7% were married couples living together, 8.0% had a female householder with no husband present, 4.0% had a male householder with no wife present, and 45.3% were non-families. 40.0% of all households were made up of individuals, and 14.7% had someone living alone who was 65 years of age or older. The average household size was 2.17 and the average family size was 2.90.

The median age in the city was 42.5 years. 22.7% of residents were under the age of 18; 4.3% were between the ages of 18 and 24; 24.6% were from 25 to 44; 28.9% were from 45 to 64; and 19.6% were 65 years of age or older. The gender makeup of the city was 50.3% male and 49.7% female.

=== 2000 census ===
As of the census of 2000, there were 239 people, 90 households, and 57 families residing in the city. The population density was 725.5 inhabitants per square mile (280.1/km^{2}). There were 107 housing units at an average density of 324.8 per square mile (125.4/km^{2}). The racial makeup of the city was 97.91% White, and 2.09% from two or more races.

There were 90 households, out of which 35.6% had children under the age of 18 living with them, 50.0% were married couples living together, 8.9% had a female householder with no husband present, and 35.6% were non-families. 26.7% of all households were made up of individuals, and 12.2% had someone living alone who was 65 years of age or older. The average household size was 2.66 and the average family size was 3.31.

In the city the population was spread out, with 29.3% under the age of 18, 9.6% from 18 to 24, 29.3% from 25 to 44, 18.0% from 45 to 64, and 13.8% who were 65 years of age or older. The median age was 34 years. For every 100 females, there were 100.8 males. For every 100 females age 18 and over, there were 96.5 males.

The median income for a household in the city was $25,625, and the median income for a family was $33,125. Males had a median income of $24,861 versus $12,250 for females. The per capita income for the city was $11,584. About 26.7% of families and 24.6% of the population were below the poverty line, including 14.3% of those under the age of eighteen and 30.6% of those 65 or over.

== Arts and culture ==
The Hurdland Fourth of July celebration is the oldest annual Independence Day celebration in northeast Missouri, and one of the oldest in the state as a whole. The first was held in 1873. The two-day festival features live music, games and contests, talent shows, and a large fireworks display.

== Education ==
It is in the Knox County R-I School District. Children of school age attend the Knox County R-1 schools in Edina.

== Public services ==
- Fire protection is provided by the Hurdland Volunteer Fire Department.
- Knox County Sheriff's Department handles law enforcement issues.
