= Connelsville, Missouri =

Unincorporated community in Missouri, U.S.

- Unincorporated community
- Interactive map of Connelsville, Missouri
- Coordinates: 40°16′39″N 92°42′01″W
- Country: United States
- State: Missouri
- County: Adair
- Township: Nineveh
- Established: 1902

Area
  - Total: 0.33 sq mi (0.86 km^{2})
  - Land: 0.33 sq mi (0.86 km^{2})
  - Water: 0 sq mi (0.00 km^{2})
- Elevation: 804 ft (245 m)

Population (2020)
  - Total: 53
  - Density: 160.0/sq mi (61.76/km^{2})
- FIPS code: 29-16138
- GNIS feature ID: 2804677

Connelsville is an unincorporated community in Nineveh Township, Adair County, Missouri, United States. The community is on Missouri Route 149 about three miles north of Novinger and eight miles northwest of Kirksville. Shuteye Creek flows past the north side of the town and its confluence with the Chariton River is about one mile to the east.

== History ==
Connelsville was laid out in 1902 next to the older town of Nineveh, soon after the railroad was extended to that point. The community's name is a transfer from Connellsville, Pennsylvania. A post office was established at Connelsville in 1902, and remained in operation until 1937.

== Demographics ==
Historical population
Census	Pop.	Note	%±
2020	53		—
U.S. Decennial Census

Connelsville first appeared as a census designated place in the 2020 U.S. census.

== Education ==
It is in the Adair County R-I School District.
