= Missouri Route 157 =

State highway in Missouri, U.S.

Route 157
- MO 157 highlighted in red

Route information
- Maintained by MoDOT
- Length: 1.766 mi (2.842 km)

Major junctions
- South end: Beach Trail in Thousand Hills State Park
- North end: Route 6 west of Kirksville

Location
- Country: United States
- State: Missouri

Highway system
- Missouri State Highway System; Interstate; US; State; Supplemental
← Route 156	→ Route 158

Route 157 is a short highway in Adair County, Missouri. Its northern terminus is at Route 6 west of Kirksville; its southern terminus is at Thousand Hills State Park. It runs less than five miles (8 km) and there are no towns on the highway.

== Route description ==
Route 157 begins at the marina on Forrest Lake in Thousand Hills State Park in Adair County, heading north as a two-lane undivided road. The road curves northwest and heads through forested areas of the state park. The route continues north and leaves the state park, passing through more forests with some homes. Route 157 comes to its northern terminus at an intersection with Route 6 west of Kirksville.

== Major intersections ==
The entire route is in Adair County.

Location	mi	km	Destinations	Notes
Thousand Hills State Park	0.000	0.000	Beach Trail/Thousand Hills Trail	Marina on Forrest Lake
	1.766	2.842	Route 6	
1.000 mi = 1.609 km; 1.000 km = 0.621 mi
