= Cabins Historic District =

Historic district in Missouri, United States

- U.S. National Register of Historic Places
- U.S. Historic district
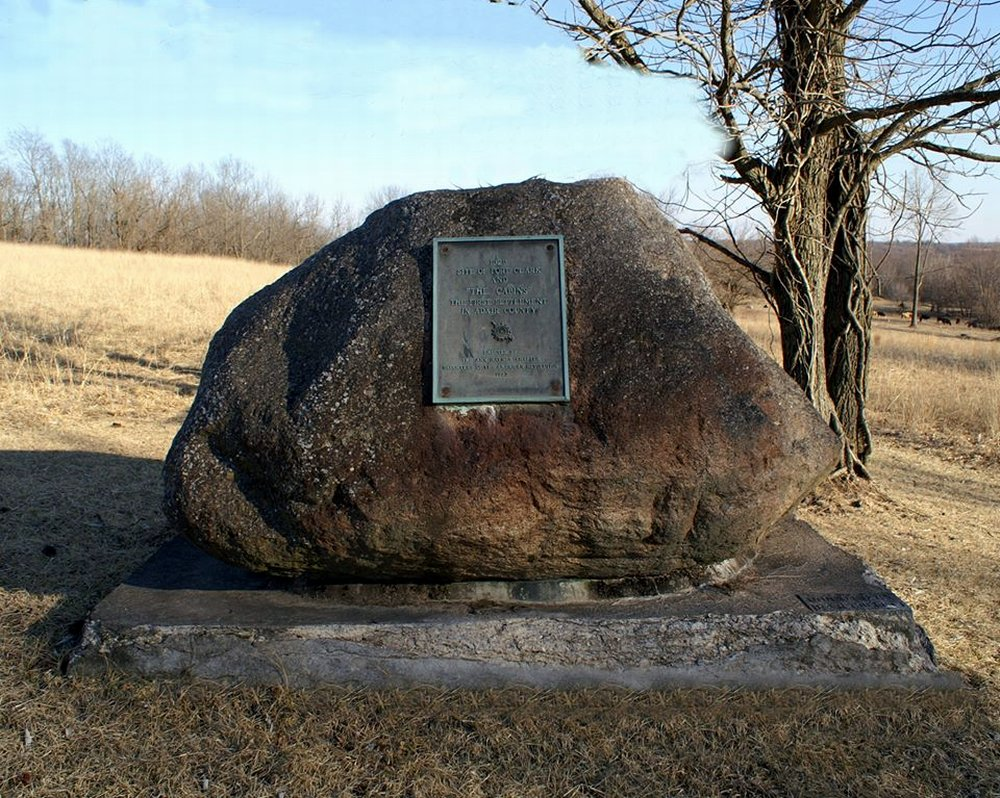
- The Cabins Historic District, June 2014

- Location within Missouri Location within the United States
- Nearest city: S of Novinger off MO 6, near Novinger, Missouri
- Coordinates: 40°12′31″N 92°41′10″W
- Area: 61 acres (25 ha)
- Built: 1829
- Built by: Multiple
- NRHP reference No.: 79001344
- Added to NRHP: July 17, 1979

Cabins Historic District is a national historic district located near Novinger, Adair County, Missouri. The district encompasses nine contributing buildings, three contributing sites, four contributing structures, and one contributing object in a relatively isolated area near Novinger. It developed between about 1829 and 1865 and was one of the earliest settlements in the interior of northeast Missouri. It includes five antebellum structures surrounded by forests and farm land. They are the John B. Cain House, the Asa King Collett House, the Ira R. Collett House and its poultry house and summer kitchen. Other notable contributing resources include the Conner Tannery site, the Collett Spring, the site of Fort Clark, the site of Camp Collett, the Collett Cemetery, and Native American burial mounds.

It was listed on the National Register of Historic Places in 1979.
