= Danforth, Missouri =

Unincorporated community in Missouri, U.S.

Coordinates: 40°14′29″N 92°44′03″W

Danforth is an unincorporated community in Adair County, in the U.S. state of Missouri.

The community is on Missouri Route O 1.5 miles northwest of Novinger. Spring Creek flows past the south side of the community.

== History ==
A post office called Danforth was established in 1885, and remained in operation until 1906. The name most likely is a transfer from Danforth, Illinois.
