= Troy Mills =

Troy Mills may refer to:

- Troy Mills, Iowa, a community in the United States
- Troy Mills, Missouri, a community in the United States
