= Nind =

Nind may refer to:

== People ==
- Anthony Nind (1926-?), British priest
- Isaac Scott Nind (1797–1868), British colonial doctor, artist and pharmacist
- Mary Clarke Nind (1825–1905), British philanthropist
- Philip Henry Nind (1831–1896), British rower

== Places ==
- Nind Nature Reserve, England
- Nind, Missouri, United States
