= Spring Creek (Chariton River tributary) =

Stream in the US state of Missouri

Spring Creek is a stream in Putnam, Sullivan and Adair counties of northern Missouri. It is a tributary of the Chariton River.

The stream headwaters arise in southern Putnam County approximately one mile east of the community of Lemmons just north of Missouri Route B at 40°24′18″N 93°02′01″W. The stream flows south into northern Sullivan County approximately 3.5 miles northeast of Pollock and continues to the southeast passing under Missouri Route 129 south of Pennville and passes through the Union Ridge Conservation Area and into Adair County. It flows past the community of Stahl and flows parallel to the south side of Missouri Route O past the community of Danforth. The stream passes under Missouri Route 6 one half mile west of Novinger to its confluence with the Chariton River at 40°12′57″N 92°41′39″W. The confluence is six miles west of the city of Kirksville.
