= Lindersville, Missouri =

Extinct town in the American state of Missouri

Coordinates: 40.0944743°N 92.7054734°W

Lindersville is an extinct town in Adair County, in the U.S. state of Missouri.

A post office called Lindersville was established in 1865, and remained in operation until 1905. The community is named after James H. Linder.
