= Stahl, Missouri =

Unincorporated community in Missouri, U.S.

Coordinates: 40°17′29″N 92°47′21″W

Stahl is an unincorporated community in northwest Adair County, Missouri, United States. The community is on Missouri Route O about six miles northwest of Novinger and 12 miles northwest of Kirksville. There are only three houses at Stahl, and an abandoned car dump along the highway. The Union Ridge Conservation Area lies to the west about two miles and Spring Creek flows past the community to its confluence with the Chariton River south of Novinger.

== History ==
Stahl was laid out in 1882 by S. F. Stahl, and named for him. A post office was established at Stahl in 1882, and remained in operation until 1949.
