= Forest Lake Area Trail System =

- Website: http://www.kvflats.org/

The ultimate goal of the Forest Lake Area Trail System (FLATS) is to develop a trail system connecting Kirksville and Thousand Hills State Park. The first phase of the trail is a ten-foot wide concrete trail between the Petroglyph Site and Marina in Thousand Hills State Park. FLATS’ long-term mission is to support the use, development, promotion, and maintenance of trails in Adair County.

The Forest Lake Area Trail System was formed by a group of citizens who volunteer their time and/or money to make this project a reality. They are working closely with the Missouri Department of Natural Resources, Thousand Hills State Park, the City of Kirksville, Adair County, area service organizations, and the Kirksville community to develop this trail.
