= Ringo Point, Missouri =

Unincorporated community in Missouri, U.S.

Coordinates: 40°10′59″N 92°49′53″W

Ringo Point is an unincorporated community in Adair County, in the U.S. state of Missouri.

== History ==
A post office called Ringo's Point was established in 1857, and remained in operation until 1886. The community was named after Joseph Ringo, an early settler.
