= Gibbs, Missouri =

- Village
- Location within Adair County (left) and Missouri (right)
- Coordinates: 40°05′56″N 92°25′00″W
- Country: United States
- State: Missouri
- County: Adair
- Township: Wilson
- Founded: 1887
- Incorporated: 1894

Area
  - Total: 0.25 sq mi (0.64 km^{2})
  - Land: 0.25 sq mi (0.64 km^{2})
  - Water: 0 sq mi (0.00 km^{2})
- Elevation: 909 ft (277 m)

Population (2020)
  - Total: 70
  - Density: 282.8/sq mi (109.18/km^{2})
- Time zone: UTC-6 (Central (CST))
  - Summer (DST): UTC-5 (CDT)
- ZIP code: 63540
- Area code: 660
- FIPS code: 29-26920
- GNIS feature ID: 2398958

Gibbs is a village in Wilson Township, Adair County, Missouri, United States. The population was 70 at the 2020 census.

== History ==
The town of Gibbs was an outgrowth of the Santa Fe Railroad, laid out in 1887 when the rail lines passed through southeastern Adair County. The name Gibbs was chosen in honor of Frank W. Gibbs, who donated land to the Santa Fe Railroad for the construction of a rail depot and stockyard. At the time of Gibbs' incorporation in 1894, it was anticipated that the town might become Adair County's main rail shipping point for the Santa Fe. This hope was bolstered by the fact that the road leading to Gibbs was the first all-weather road in the county. In the late 1800s a considerable amount of cattle and hogs were shipped from the Gibbs depot to packing houses in Chicago, along with seasonal carloads of fresh apples, strawberries, and eggs to points across America. Perrin & Company of Chicago also constructed a grain elevator trackside for the storage and shipping of corn, with lesser amounts of barley, oats, and wheat. The addition of a second Santa Fe trackline next to the existing one in 1908 added to Gibbs residents hopes for a bright future.

Frank W. Gibbs, founder of the town.

However, the majority of merchants and businesses of Kirksville, the county's major trading hub, instead chose to use La Plata, on the Macon-Adair County border, as their major shipping and passenger service outlet on the Santa Fe. A US Post Office was established in 1887, and several businesses could be found including a barber shop, several general merchants, and two blacksmiths. The Gibbs business district also had of two hotels, an opera house, a bank, lumberyard, undertaker service, a cement factory, and the aforementioned grain elevator. The Bank Of Gibbs was founded in 1898 and served the citizens of Gibbs, Adair County, and northern Macon county well. It closed in 1933. For a time at the turn-of-the-century Gibbs had its own newspaper, Gibbs Telegraph. Gibbs featured four churches, but a falling population led to the closing of the last one in the early 1980s. The last Gibbs business, a grocery store, closed in 1970. It was also in that year that a rural health clinic, established by a Kirksville hospital in 1949, closed. The Santa Fe rail depot was closed in the 1960s and the two-room school was consolidated into the Brashear (Adair County R-2) school system in 1966. It is now primarily a 'bedroom community' with most residents traveling to cities like Kirksville and Macon for employment. A 2007 rental dispute between the US Postal Service and the buildings owners has led to the closing, at least temporarily, of the Gibbs post office.

== Geography ==
According to the United States Census Bureau, the village has a total area of 0.25 square miles (0.65 km^{2}), all land.

== Demographics ==
Historical population
| Census | Pop. | Note | %± |
|---|---|---|---|
| 1900 | 168 | | — |
| 1910 | 226 | | 34.5% |
| 1920 | 217 | | −4.0% |
| 1930 | 158 | | −27.2% |
| 1940 | 152 | | −3.8% |
| 1950 | 144 | | −5.3% |
| 1960 | 158 | | 9.7% |
| 1970 | 112 | | −29.1% |
| 1980 | 107 | | −4.5% |
| 1990 | 89 | | −16.8% |
| 2000 | 100 | | 12.4% |
| 2010 | 107 | | 7.0% |
| 2020 | 70 | | −34.6% |
U.S. Decennial Census

Gibbs is part of the Kirksville Micropolitan Statistical Area.

=== 2010 census ===
As of the census of 2010, there were 107 people, 34 households, and 26 families residing in the village. The population density was 428.0 inhabitants per square mile (165.3/km^{2}). There were 42 housing units at an average density of 168.0 per square mile (64.9/km^{2}). The racial makeup of the village was 91.6% White, 1.9% African American, 1.9% Native American, and 4.7% from two or more races. Hispanic or Latino of any race were 0.9% of the population.

There were 34 households, of which 41.2% had children under the age of 18 living with them, 58.8% were married couples living together, 11.8% had a female householder with no husband present, 5.9% had a male householder with no wife present, and 23.5% were non-families. 20.6% of all households were made up of individuals, and 2.9% had someone living alone who was 65 years of age or older. The average household size was 3.15 and the average family size was 3.65.

The median age in the village was 29.8 years. 38.3% of residents were under the age of 18; 6.5% were between the ages of 18 and 24; 24.3% were from 25 to 44; 24.2% were from 45 to 64; and 6.5% were 65 years of age or older. The gender makeup of the village was 52.3% male and 47.7% female.

=== 2000 census ===
As of the census of 2000, there were 100 people, 34 households, and 28 families residing in the village. The population density was 401.2 inhabitants per square mile (154.9/km^{2}). There were 42 housing units at an average density of 168.5 per square mile (65.1/km^{2}). The racial makeup of the village was 97.00% White, and 3.00% from two or more races.

There were 34 households, out of which 35.3% had children under the age of 18 living with them, 58.8% were married couples living together, 17.6% had a female householder with no husband present, and 17.6% were non-families. 17.6% of all households were made up of individuals, and 2.9% had someone living alone who was 65 years of age or older. The average household size was 2.94 and the average family size was 3.29.

In the village, the population was spread out, with 32.0% under the age of 18, 7.0% from 18 to 24, 30.0% from 25 to 44, 22.0% from 45 to 64, and 9.0% who were 65 years of age or older. The median age was 32 years. For every 100 females, there were 112.8 males. For every 100 females age 18 and over, there were 112.5 males.

The median income for a household in the village was $23,611, and the median income for a family was $23,889. Males had a median income of $21,250 versus $13,750 for females. The per capita income for the village was $9,368. There were 20.0% of families and 37.1% of the population living below the poverty line, including 70.0% of under eighteens and 44.4% of those over 64.

== Transportation ==
Amtrak’s Southwest Chief, which operates between Los Angeles and Chicago, passes through the town on BNSF tracks, but makes no stop. The nearest station is located in La Plata, 13 miles (21 km) to the southwest.

== Education ==
It is in the Adair County R-II School District.
