= Floyd Creek =

Stream in Adair County, Missouri, U.S.

Coordinates: 40.2175346°N 92.4354683°W

Floyd Creek is a stream in Adair County in the U.S. state of Missouri.

Floyd Creek has the name of Jonathan Floyd, a pioneer settler.

== See also ==
- List of rivers of Missouri
