= Millard, Missouri =

- Village
- Location within Adair County (left) and Missouri (right)
- Coordinates: 40°06′27″N 92°32′45″W
- Country: United States
- State: Missouri
- County: Adair
- Township: Pettis
- Established: 1872

Area
  - Total: 0.12 sq mi (0.31 km^{2})
  - Land: 0.12 sq mi (0.31 km^{2})
  - Water: 0 sq mi (0.00 km^{2})
- Elevation: 968 ft (295 m)

Population (2020)
  - Total: 79
  - Density: 656.0/sq mi (253.28/km^{2})
- Time zone: UTC-6 (Central (CST))
  - Summer (DST): UTC-5 (CDT)
- ZIP code: 63501
- Area code: 660
- FIPS code: 29-48134
- GNIS feature ID: 2399350

Millard is a village in Pettis Township, Adair County, Missouri, United States. The population was 79 at the 2020 census.

== History ==
Millard was laid out in 1872, and most likely named after Maggie A. Miller, one of the founders. A post office called Millard was established in 1870, and remained in operation until 1942.

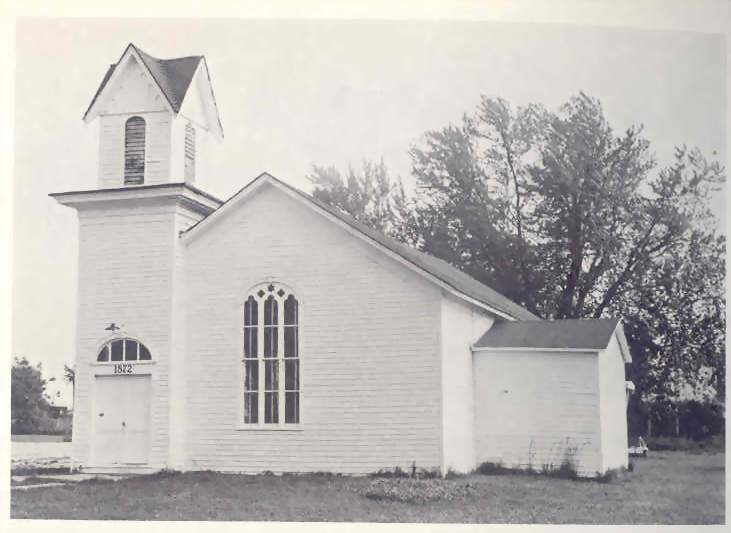
Millard Church, built in 1872. It remains the oldest church building still in use in Adair County, Missouri.

== Geography ==
According to the United States Census Bureau, the village has a total area of 0.12 square miles (0.31 km^{2}), all land.

== Demographics ==
Historical population
Census	Pop.	Note	%±
1880	123		—
1980	92		—
1990	71		−22.8%
2000	75		5.6%
2010	89		18.7%
2020	79		−11.2%
U.S. Decennial Census

Millard is part of the Kirksville Micropolitan Statistical Area.

=== 2010 census ===
As of the census of 2010, there were 89 people, 40 households, and 27 families residing in the village. The population density was 741.7 inhabitants per square mile (286.4/km^{2}). There were 45 housing units at an average density of 375.0 per square mile (144.8/km^{2}). The racial makeup of the village was 96.6% White, 1.1% from other races, and 2.2% from two or more races. Hispanic or Latino of any race were 1.1% of the population.

There were 40 households, of which 22.5% had children under the age of 18 living with them, 57.5% were married couples living together, 7.5% had a female householder with no husband present, 2.5% had a male householder with no wife present, and 32.5% were non-families. 30.0% of all households were made up of individuals, and 12.5% had someone living alone who was 65 years of age or older. The average household size was 2.23 and the average family size was 2.70.

The median age in the village was 51.5 years. 23.6% of residents were under the age of 18; 1.2% were between the ages of 18 and 24; 19.1% were from 25 to 44; 40.4% were from 45 to 64; and 15.7% were 65 years of age or older. The gender makeup of the village was 49.4% male and 50.6% female.

=== 2000 census ===
As of the census of 2000, there were 75 people, 34 households, and 24 families residing in the village. The population density was 606.5 inhabitants per square mile (234.2/km^{2}). There were 39 housing units at an average density of 315.4 per square mile (121.8/km^{2}). The racial makeup of the village was 100.00% White.

There were 34 households, out of which 20.6% had children under the age of 18 living with them, 58.8% were married couples living together, 2.9% had a female householder with no husband present, and 29.4% were non-families. 23.5% of all households were made up of individuals, and 8.8% had someone living alone who was 65 years of age or older. The average household size was 2.21 and the average family size was 2.58.

In the village, the population was spread out, with 17.3% under the age of 18, 4.0% from 18 to 24, 30.7% from 25 to 44, 32.0% from 45 to 64, and 16.0% who were 65 years of age or older. The median age was 44 years. For every 100 females, there were 108.3 males. For every 100 females age 18 and over, there were 100.0 males.

The median income for a household in the village was $25,833, and the median income for a family was $35,625. Males had a median income of $19,375 versus $21,563 for females. The per capita income for the village was $16,458. There were 10.0% of families and 18.3% of the population living below the poverty line, including no under eighteens and 36.4% of those over 64.

== Education ==
It is within the Kirksville R-III School District.
