= Sperry, Missouri =

Unincorporated community in Missouri, U.S.

Coordinates: 40°16′47″N 92°29′19″W

Sperry is an unincorporated community in Adair County, in the U.S. state of Missouri. A fencing business is the only business or service at Sperry; there are also a few homes.

== History ==
A post office called Sperry was established in 1883, and remained in operation until 1907. The community's name is a transfer from Sperry, Michigan.
