= Willmathsville, Missouri =

Unincorporated community in Missouri, U.S.

Coordinates: 40°19′35″N 92°24′33″W

Willmathsville is an unincorporated community in Adair County, in the U.S. state of Missouri.

== History ==
Willmathsville was laid out in 1856, and named after the local Wilmoth family. A post office called Willmathsville was established in 1855, and remained in operation until 1951.
