= Sublette, Missouri =

Unincorporated community in Missouri, U.S.

Coordinates: 40°18′02″N 92°34′18″W

Sublette is an unincorporated community in northern Adair County, Missouri, United States. The community is on U.S. Route 63 about six miles north of Kirksville.

== History ==
Sublette was laid out in 1869. It was named for its founders, P. J. and Sarah R. Sublette. A post office called Sublette was established in 1868, and remained in operation until 1933.
