= Prairie Township, Schuyler County, Missouri =

Township in the American state of Missouri

Coordinates: 40.4294°N 92.5825°W

Prairie Township is an inactive township in Schuyler County, in the U.S. state of Missouri.

Prairie Township was erected in 1853, and remains the largest township in the county by area. The township is located in the southwest of the county, with its southern boundary being Salt River Township.
