= Yarrow, Missouri =

Unincorporated community in Missouri, U.S.

Coordinates: 40°05′38″N 92°40′50″W

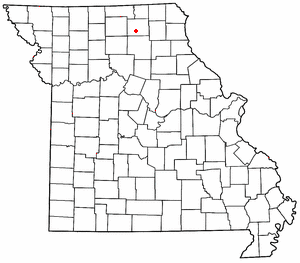

Yarrow is an unincorporated community in southwestern Adair County, Missouri, United States. It is located on Missouri Supplemental Route N, approximately ten miles (16 km) southwest of Kirksville. Yarrow's post office has closed and mail now comes from Kirksville.

== History ==
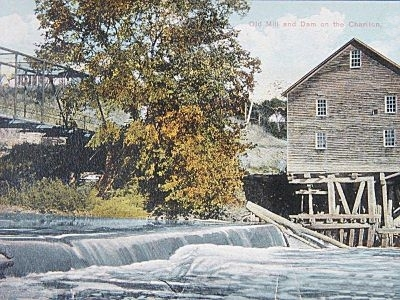
Portrait of Webers Mill in Yarrow, Missouri, 1920.

Yarrow began in 1847 as Domey's Mill, a grist mill built on the east bank of the Chariton River to serve farmers in southern Adair County, Missouri. This original mill was destroyed by winter ice floes in 1874. However, the demand for services was so great a new mill was up and running on the same location by 1876. This second building was much larger and also featured a sawmill.

The town itself went through many names in its early years including Domeys Mill, Lower Iron Bridge, and Linderville before an unknown government postal official assigned the name Yarrow near the start of the 20th century. The name was said to be chosen for the profusion of wildflowers that grew on hillsides surrounding the mill site.

The coming of the Iowa & St. Louis Railway in 1902 and building of a depot lead to a boom in business and population growth for the sleepy little river hamlet. At one time Yarrow featured a bank, general store, post office, and several other businesses.

One interesting historical footnote, Yarrow was once considered the smallest community in America with electricity. This came about in 1910 when then-mill owner Michael Weber installed a water powered generator. Wires were strung around town, allowing homes and businesses to have electric lighting from 6 to 10:30 p.m. at the rate of one cent per light per night. With the exception of larger towns like Kirksville and Novinger, the rest of Adair County, and indeed much of northeast Missouri, would have to wait many years more for rural electrification.

Just like the river waters, time flowed on past Yarrow, preventing further growth. The Great Depression and improved transportation hit hard at small communities across the nation, and Yarrow was no exception. The bank closed in the early 1930s, followed by the mill in 1937. Winter ice floes again wreaked their toll upon the mill in 1941, causing a large portion to collapse into the river. One general store hung on into the early 1970s before closing.

A view of Webers Mill, the mill dam, and iron bridge around 1910.

This store remained open until the early 1970s.

== Yarrow today ==
Yarrow today is still home to several families and a part-time residence for still more. Excellent fishing led to a series of small cottages and weekend retreats being built on the west bank of the Chariton River across from Yarrow shortly after World War II. The remnants of the mill dam were removed by the US Army Corps Of Engineers as part of a river rechannelization project in the 1950s and all that remains of the old mill site is a concrete slab.

For a time in the 1980s Yarrow would see its population swell into the many hundreds one weekend each year as it became the finish line for the Great Chariton River Raft Race, an event involving home-built rafts of often great imagination floating downriver from Novinger, Missouri.

While the Iowa & St. Louis Railroad long ago ceased operations through Yarrow, the former I & St.L depot still remains and has been converted into a private residence. Something of a business boomlet has occurred in recent years as well, with a popular local bar and restaurant, and a campground now operating on the edge of the village.
