= Bullion, Missouri =

Unincorporated community in Missouri, U.S.

Coordinates: 40°10′17″N 92°29′18″W

Bullion is an unincorporated community in Adair County, in the U.S. state of Missouri.

== History ==
A post office called Bullion was established in 1882, and remained in operation until 1904. The community was named after C. H. Bull, a railroad promoter.
