= Clay, Missouri =

Unincorporated community in Missouri, U.S.

Coordinates: 40°13′39″N 92°27′09″W

Clay is an unincorporated community in Adair County, in the U.S. state of Missouri.

== History ==
A post office called Clay was established in 1894, and remained in operation until 1908. The community most likely was named for its location within Clay Township.
