= Fegley, Missouri =

Unincorporated community in Missouri, U.S.

Coordinates: 40°17′10″N 92°38′58″W

Fegley is an unincorporated community in Adair County, in the U.S. state of Missouri.

== History ==
A post office called Fegley was established in 1899, and remained in operation until 1907. The community was named after Avid Fegley, an early settler.
