= Liberty Township, Adair County, Missouri =

Liberty Township, Missouri
- Township
- Coordinates: 40°09′50″N 092°46′13″W
- Country: United States
- State: Missouri
- County: Adair

Area
  - Total: 52.95 sq mi (137.15 km^{2})
  - Land: 52.95 sq mi (137.15 km^{2})
  - Water: 0 sq mi (0.0 km^{2}) 0.0%
- Elevation: 955 ft (291 m)

Population (2010)
  - Total: 324
  - Density: 6.2/sq mi (2.4/km^{2})
- FIPS code: 29-41924
- GNIS feature ID: 0766212

Liberty Township is one of ten townships in Adair County, Missouri, United States. As of the 2010 census, its population was 324. Liberty Township was probably named from the patriotic concept of liberty.

== Geography ==
Liberty Township covers an area of 52.94 square miles (137.1 km^{2}). Its eastern boundary is formed by the Chariton River, and its western edge is that of the county. The township contains no incorporated settlements, though there are named places such as Midland (once known as Tipperary") and Youngstown, both of which served the coal mines once worked in the area. It contains seven cemeteries: Baden Springs, Lutz, Mount Moriah, Parcell Salisbury, Pinkerton, Pratt and Ringo Point.
