= Clay Township, Adair County, Missouri =

Clay Township, Missouri
- Township
- Coordinates: 40°16′47″N 092°26′25″W
- Country: United States
- State: Missouri
- County: Adair

Area
  - Total: 79.62 sq mi (206.21 km^{2})
  - Land: 79.58 sq mi (206.10 km^{2})
  - Water: 0.039 sq mi (0.10 km^{2}) 0.05%
- Elevation: 935 ft (285 m)

Population (2010)
  - Total: 626
  - Density: 7.8/sq mi (3/km^{2})
- FIPS code: 29-14248
- GNIS feature ID: 0766211

Clay Township is one of ten townships located in Adair County, Missouri, United States. As of the 2010 census, its population was 626. It is named in honor of Kentucky politician Henry Clay.

== Geography ==
Clay Township covers an area of 79.6 square miles (206.2 km^{2}) and contains no incorporated settlements. It contains one cemetery, Richardson.

The streams of Bee Branch, Cottonwood Fork, Floyd Creek and Willow Branch run through this township.
