= Lick Skillet, Virginia =

- Unincorporated community
- Location within Virginia Location within the United States
- Coordinates: 36°53′39″N 81°47′28″W
- Country: United States
- State: Virginia
- County: Smyth
- Elevation: 1,929 ft (588 m)
- Time zone: UTC-5 (Eastern (EST))
  - Summer (DST): UTC-4 (EDT)
- GNIS feature ID: 1484836

Lick Skillet is an unincorporated community in Smyth County, Virginia, United States. According to local legend, Lick Skillet's name is derived from the roads around the community which form the appearance of a skillet.
