= Coal City, Iowa =

- Unincorporated community
- Location within Iowa
- Coordinates: 40°35′50″N 92°43′08″W
- Country: United States
- State: Iowa
- County: Appanoose
- Elevation: 820 ft (250 m)
- Time zone: UTC-6 (Central (CST))
  - Summer (DST): UTC-5 (CDT)
- Area code: 641
- GNIS feature ID: 464333

Coal City is an unincorporated community in Appanoose County, Iowa, United States.

== History ==
Coal City was historically noted for its underground coal mines. The community's population was 40 in 1925. The population was 65 in 1940.
