= Thousand Hills State Park =

State park in Missouri, United States

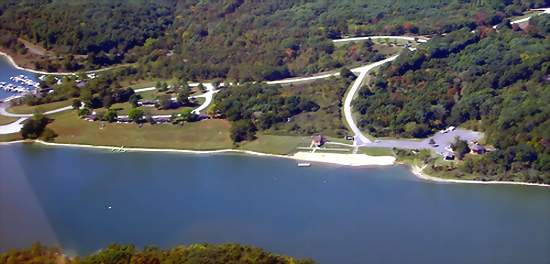
- Aerial view of Thousand Hills swim beach & cabins area

- Location within Missouri Location within the United States
- Location: Iron and Reynolds counties, Missouri, United
- Coordinates: 40°10′37″N 92°38′37″W
- Area: 3,086.75 acres (1,249.16 ha)
- Elevation: 797 ft (243 m)
- Established: 1952
- Administrator: Missouri Department of Natural Resources
- Visitors: 537,759 (in 2023)
- Website: Official website
- Thousand Hills State Park Petroglyphs Archeological Site
- U.S. National Register of Historic Places
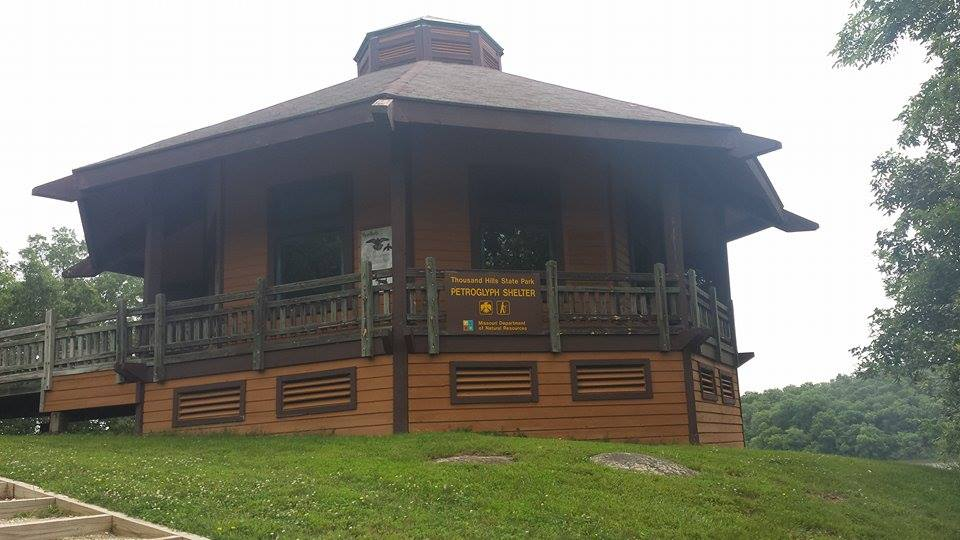
- Shelter protecting petroglyphs at Thousand Hills State Park

- Location within Missouri Location within the United States
- Nearest city: Kirksville, Missouri
- Area: 9.9 acres (4.0 ha)
- NRHP reference No.: 70000320
- Added to NRHP: January 23, 1970

Thousand Hills State Park is a public recreation area covering over 3,000 acres (1,200 ha) two miles (3.2 km) west of Kirksville in Adair County, Missouri. The state park features Native American petroglyphs and 573-acre (232 ha) Forest Lake with fishing, swimming and boating.

== History ==
By the late 1940s, the nearby city of Kirksville was in need of a larger and more reliable water supply than the Chariton River could provide. In October 1948, the family of local physician George Laughlin donated 1,100 acres (450 ha) to the city. The city of Kirksville matched the donation by purchasing an additional 1,150 acres (470 ha). Following voter passage of a special bond issue, land was acquired to construct a dam across Big Creek, a tributary of the Chariton. Upon its completion in summer 1952, the new reservoir was known as "Lake Kirksville" but by September that year the Kirksville city council, through ordinance, officially designed the reservoir "Forest Lake" (with one "r") so named for the surrounding woodlands. The lands, but not the lake itself (owned by the city of Kirksville), were presented to the state of Missouri free of charge in return for the promise of establishing a state park and protecting the land around the water reservoir. It was named Thousand Hills State Park, in honor of Doctor Laughlin's Thousand Hills Farm that had formerly occupied part of the land. Missouri Governor Forrest Smith, who attended the 1953 ceremony, has been erroneously linked to several historical accounts that claim Forest Lake was named in his honor.

== Petroglyphs ==
A series of Native American rock carvings, listed on the National Register of Historic Places, are protected in an enclosed observation and interpretation center. The carvings are estimated to date back at least 1,500 years.

== Activities and amenities ==
The park's lake is used for fishing, swimming, and both motorized and non-motorized boating. A marina offers boat and equipment rentals. Two campgrounds provide a total of 57 campsites. Overnight accommodations are also offered at seven duplex cabins. Trails are available for hiking and bicycling and include the Carolyn Bagley Harding Trail, which is a paved trail being developed in cooperation with the community volunteer organization FLATS (Forest Lake Area Trail System).

== Annual events ==
The park hosts an annual bass tournament in spring. (Note: The NEMO Triathlon formerly held in September was discontinued in 2017. Dark-sky certification occurred in 2025: "Thousand Hills State Park certified as an Urban Night Sky Place by DarkSky International", DarkSky International (November 25, 2024).) In 2023, the park began hosting an annual Earth Day event in April and Archaeology Day in September.
