= Shibleys Point, Missouri =

Unincorporated community in Missouri, U.S.

Coordinates: 40°18′48″N 92°45′40″W

Shibleys Point is an unincorporated community in Adair County, Missouri, United States.

== History ==
Shibleys Point is named for the Shibley family of pioneer settlers, who settled there circa 1840. A post office called Shibley's Point was established in 1855, and remained in operation until 1908.
