= Pettis Township, Adair County, Missouri =

Pettis Township, Missouri
- Township
- Coordinates: 40°05′13″N 092°35′05″W
- Country: United States
- State: Missouri
- County: Adair

Area
  - Total: 56.44 sq mi (146.19 km^{2})
  - Land: 56.25 sq mi (145.69 km^{2})
  - Water: 0.19 sq mi (0.50 km^{2}) 0.34%
- Elevation: 965 ft (294 m)

Population (2010)
  - Total: 795
  - Density: 14/sq mi (5.5/km^{2})
- FIPS code: 29-57224
- GNIS feature ID: 0766215

Pettis Township is one of ten townships in Adair County, Missouri, United States. As of the 2010 census, its population was 795. It is named for former US Congressman Spencer Pettis, who represented Missouri from 1829 to 1831 until being killed in a duel.

== Geography ==
Pettis Township covers an area of 56.4 square miles (146.2 km^{2}) and contains one incorporated settlement, Millard. It contains seven cemeteries: Bragg, Canaday, Indian Hill, Indian Hill (historical), Shaver, Shoemaker and Stukey.

The streams of Elm Creek, Goose Creek, Hog Creek, Indian Creek, Sugar Creek and Turkey Run run through this township.

== Transportation ==
Pettis Township contains one airport, Kirksville Regional Airport.

U.S. Highway 63 passes through the township.
