= Nineveh Township, Adair County, Missouri =

Nineveh Township, Missouri
- Township
- Coordinates: 40°15′21″N 092°41′50″W
- Country: United States
- State: Missouri
- County: Adair

Area
  - Total: 54.41 sq mi (140.93 km^{2})
  - Land: 54.28 sq mi (140.58 km^{2})
  - Water: 0.14 sq mi (0.35 km^{2}) 0.25%
- Elevation: 804 ft (245 m)

Population (2010)
  - Total: 1,289
  - Density: 24/sq mi (9.2/km^{2})
- FIPS code: 29-52526
- GNIS feature ID: 0766214

Nineveh Township is one of ten townships in Adair County, Missouri, United States. As of the 2010 census, its population was 1,289. It contains the census-designated place of Connelsville. The township is named from the town of Nineveh, a German communistic colony that was established in the area in about 1850.

== Geography ==
Nineveh Township covers an area of 54.41 square miles (140.9 km^{2}) and contains one incorporated settlement, Novinger. It contains two cemeteries: Nineveh and Novinger.

The streams of Brush Creek, Davis Branch, Hazel Creek, Little Hazel Creek, Mulberry Creek, Rye Creek, Shuteye Creek and Spring Creek run through this township.
