= Chariton Township, Howard County, Missouri =

Inactive township in Missouri, U.S.

Coordinates: 39.2108°N 92.8233°W

Chariton Township is an inactive township in Howard County, in the U.S. state of Missouri.

Chariton Township was erected in 1821.
