= Nind, Missouri =

Unincorporated community in Missouri, U.S.

Coordinates: 40°04′14″N 92°46′05″W

Nind is an unincorporated community in Adair County, in the U.S. state of Missouri.

== History ==
A post office called Nind was established in 1887, and remained in operation until 1907. The origin of the name Nind is obscure.
