= Walnut Township, Adair County, Missouri =

Walnut Township, Missouri
- Township
- Coordinates: 40°05′02″N 092°45′51″W
- Country: United States
- State: Missouri
- County: Adair

Area
  - Total: 52.08 sq mi (134.89 km^{2})
  - Land: 52.08 sq mi (134.88 km^{2})
  - Water: 0.0039 sq mi (0.01 km^{2}) 0.01%
- Elevation: 950 ft (290 m)

Population (2020)
  - Total: 219
  - Density: 4.9/sq mi (1.9/km^{2})
- FIPS code: 29-76786
- GNIS feature ID: 0766218

Walnut Township is one of ten townships in Adair County, Missouri, United States. At the 2020 census, its population was 219. Walnut Township was named from the old-growth forests of walnut it contained at the time of settlement.

== Geography ==
Walnut Township covers an area of 52.1 square miles (134.9 km^{2}) and contains no incorporated settlements.

The streams of Little Mussel Creek and Little Walnut Creek run through this township.

== History ==
Walnut Township is a township in Adair County, Missouri, organized in 1865. It was named for the extensive walnut forests originally found in the area.
