= Brashear, Missouri =

- Town
- Location within Adair County (left) and Missouri (right)
- Coordinates: 40°08′54″N 92°22′39″W
- Country: United States
- State: Missouri
- County: Adair
- Township: Salt River
- Established: 1872

Area
  - Total: 0.35 sq mi (0.91 km^{2})
  - Land: 0.35 sq mi (0.91 km^{2})
  - Water: 0 sq mi (0.00 km^{2})
- Elevation: 873 ft (266 m)

Population (2020)
  - Total: 235
  - Density: 670.9/sq mi (259.03/km^{2})
- Time zone: UTC-6 (Central (CST))
  - Summer (DST): UTC-5 (CDT)
- ZIP code: 63533
- Area code: 660
- FIPS code: 29-08002
- GNIS feature ID: 2393401

Brashear is a city in Salt River Township, Adair County, Missouri, United States. The population was 235 at the 2020 census.

== History ==
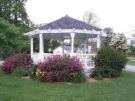
Entertainment gazebo in City Park

The town of Brashear was laid out in 1872. It was named after Richard Matson Brashear (1846-1933), who was a prominent farmer and businessman in the area. Richard Matson Brashear was the son of William Gowan Brashear (1807-1862), who is said to have been one of the first white settlers in the area in 1842. However, the Brashear community dates back prior to 1872 by several years. Approximately one mile north of the current location, there once stood a prosperous small village named Paulville, also known as Paultown, which was established around 1855 by a man named Walker Paul (1816-1888). Paulville served as a trading hub for the farms of eastern Adair County, along with several other businesses, one of which was a grist mill. Sometime during the Civil War, the grist mill was put to the torch to prevent Confederate recruits from being resupplied. The coming of the Quincy, Missouri & Pacific Railroad in 1872 saw a wholesale population shift. The building of a rail depot at the newly platted town of Brashear caused a very large portion of Paulville's population and business to migrate the short distance south. Through the latter half of the 19th century and first few decades of the 20th, Brashear's business district ebbed and flowed. Similarly, the Great Depression and post-World War Two mobility of the American public led to many changes. In 1950 Brashear had a population of only 152, however that number has been on a slight rise ever since. A few business concerns remain today, but most residents travel west to Kirksville or east to Edina for their shopping and employment.

== Geography ==
Brashear is located on Missouri Route 6 3.5 miles west of Hurdland and 13 miles east-southeast of Kirksville. The community lies on Hog Branch one mile east of the North Fork of the Salt River.

According to the United States Census Bureau, the city has a total area of 0.35 square miles (0.91 km^{2}), all land.

== Demographics ==
Historical population
Census	Pop.	Note	%±
1880	164		—
1890	316		92.7%
1900	401		26.9%
1910	458		14.2%
1920	339		−26.0%
1930	438		29.2%
1940	345		−21.2%
1950	319		−7.5%
1960	309		−3.1%
1970	316		2.3%
1980	332		5.1%
1990	318		−4.2%
2000	280		−11.9%
2010	273		−2.5%
2020	235		−13.9%
U.S. Decennial Census

Brashear is part of the Kirksville Micropolitan Statistical Area.

=== 2010 census ===
As of the census of 2010, there were 273 people, 120 households, and 71 families residing in the city. The population density was 780.0 inhabitants per square mile (301.2/km^{2}). There were 133 housing units at an average density of 380.0 per square mile (146.7/km^{2}). The racial makeup of the city was 95.6% White, 0.4% Native American, 0.7% Asian, and 3.3% from two or more races.

There were 120 households, of which 36.7% had children under the age of 18 living with them, 38.3% were married couples living together, 14.2% had a female householder with no husband present, 6.7% had a male householder with no wife present, and 40.8% were non-families. 35.8% of all households were made up of individuals, and 15.9% had someone living alone who was 65 years of age or older. The average household size was 2.28 and the average family size was 2.94.

The median age in the city was 37.5 years. 26.4% of residents were under the age of 18; 9.2% were between the ages of 18 and 24; 20.5% were from 25 to 44; 32.4% were from 45 to 64; and 11.7% were 65 years of age or older. The gender makeup of the city was 48.0% male and 52.0% female.

=== 2000 census ===
As of the census of 2000, there were 280 people, 124 households, and 73 families residing in the city. The population density was 796.7 inhabitants per square mile (307.6/km^{2}). There were 142 housing units at an average density of 404.1 per square mile (156.0/km^{2}). The racial makeup of the city was 97.14% White, 0.36% from other races, and 2.50% from two or more races. Hispanic or Latino of any race were 1.43% of the population.

There were 124 households, out of which 30.6% had children under the age of 18 living with them, 47.6% were married couples living together, 8.9% had a female householder with no husband present, and 41.1% were non-families. 36.3% of all households were made up of individuals, and 23.4% had someone living alone who was 65 years of age or older. The average household size was 2.26 and the average family size was 3.00.

In the city the population was spread out, with 26.4% under the age of 18, 5.7% from 18 to 24, 25.4% from 25 to 44, 26.1% from 45 to 64, and 16.4% who were 65 years of age or older. The median age was 41 years. For every 100 females, there were 98.6 males. For every 100 females age 18 and over, there were 89.0 males.

The median income for a household in the city was $21,750, and the median income for a family was $32,500. Males had a median income of $19,479 versus $22,500 for females. The per capita income for the city was $11,763. About 20.6% of families and 26.5% of the population were below the poverty line, including 39.7% of those under the age of eighteen and 31.8% of those 65 or over.

== Education ==
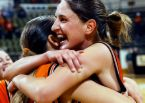
Brashear Lady Tigers players celebrate their first Missouri Class 1A basketball championship, March 2003. The team would repeat as state champs in 2004.

It is in the Adair County R-II School District.

Like many small rural towns, Adair County R-2 school is often the focus of community activity. The first school building was established in Brashear in 1857. By 1917 three years of high school credit could be obtained, and by 1922 Brashear was an accredited four-year high school. In 1925 the first Brashear High School was destroyed by fire, but quickly rebuilt. By January 1965 all surrounding rural schools had been consolidated into the current R-2 District. Not long after the destruction of the first high school, a northern Missouri legend was born: the annual Brashear Basketball Tournament. The year 1918 saw the birth of organized school basketball at Brashear, and by 1927 the first tournament was held. Through good times and bad the tournament has persevered to become one of the oldest in Missouri. The Brashear Lady Tigers won back-to-back Missouri Class 1A state basketball titles in 2003 and 2004. On June 3, 2010 the Brashear Tigers baseball team competed in the Missouri Class 1A baseball championship game, taking second place. Brashear is a charter member of the Tri-County Conference in athletics, academics, and music.
