= Chariton Township, Randolph County, Missouri =

Township in Randolph County, Missouri, U.S.

Coordinates: 39.5542°N 92.6189°W

Chariton Township is an inactive township in Randolph County, in the U.S. state of Missouri.

Chariton Township was erected in 1832.
