= Youngstown, Missouri =

Unincorporated community in Missouri, U.S.

Coordinates: 40°10′29″N 92°40′56″W

Youngstown is an unincorporated community in Adair County, in the U.S. state of Missouri.

== History ==
A post office called Youngstown was established in 1903, and remained in operation until 1942. The community derives its name from George Young, the original owner of the town site.
