= Lickskillet, Kentucky =

Lickskillet may refer to:

- Lickskillet, Logan County, Kentucky
- Lickskillet, Meade County, Kentucky
- former name for Clifty, Kentucky, in Todd County
- former name for Glenville, Kentucky, in McLean County
