= Kirksville High School =

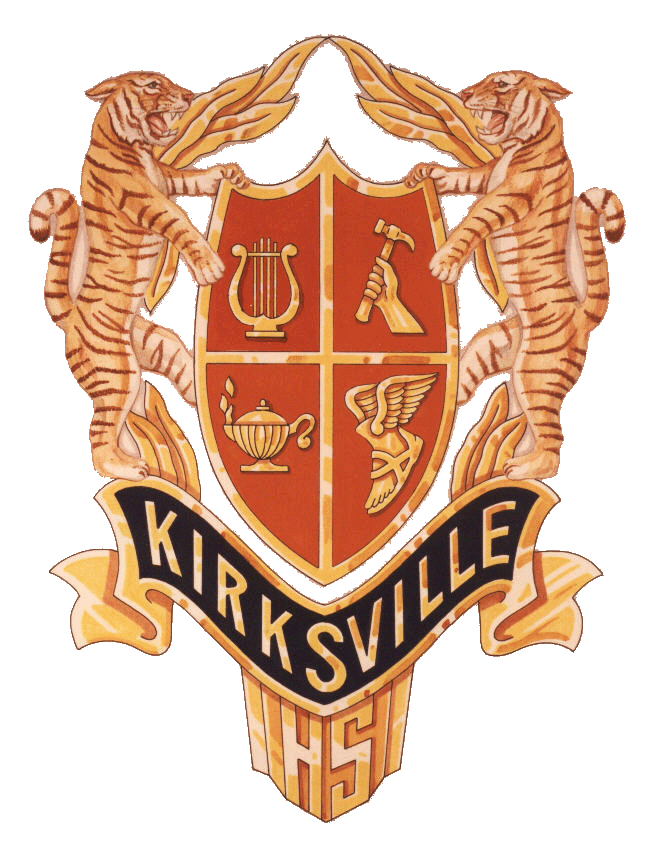

Location
- 1300 S. Cottage Grove; Kirksville, Missouri 63501; United States; 40.185°N 92.566°W

Information
- School type: high school
- Motto: "Get Better Everyday"
- Established: 1894
- School district: Kirksville R-III School District
- Superintendent: Robert Webb
- Principal: Christopher Best
- Staff: 45.24 (on an FTE basis)
- Grades: 9–12
- Enrollment: 763 (2023-24)
- Student to teacher ratio: 16.87
- Colors: Orange & Black
- Athletics conference: North Central Missouri Conference
- Nickname: Tigers
- Rival: Moberly
- Newspaper: The Paw Print
- Yearbook: The Regit
- Website: www.kirksville.k12.mo.us/o/khs

Kirksville High School is a public high school located in Kirksville, Missouri, United States. The school serves grades 9 through 12, and is part of the Kirksville R-III School District.

== History ==
The second Kirksville High School, constructed in 1899.

While public education existed in Kirksville from at least the American Civil War era, there was no separate high school building until 1894. The first purpose-built high school building was not built until 1899. However rapid community growth soon necessitated the construction of a bigger KHS in 1914. This building, near downtown Kirksville, served the community well for over forty years. Post-World War II growth and influx of new citizens as well as the post-war baby boom, pointed out the need to plan for the future. As a result, in 1960 the current Kirksville High School was constructed. Its campus-style design was more conducive to expansions and remodeling, both of which have occurred through the decades, ensuring high school education without the high expense of yet another new building. The old Kirksville high school building, constructed in 1914 and located in the 400 block of East McPherson street, fell into disrepair after its discontinued use in the 1980s. Despite efforts to save it, the building was condemned in 2007 and razed in April 2019.

== Academics ==
KHS participates in the Missouri A+ program. The school was once included on the bronze list of America's Best High Schools as judged by U.S. News & World Report magazine.

== Extracurricular activities ==
=== Academics ===
In May, 2010 the KHS Academic Team aka "Quiz Bowl" varsity team took first place in the Missouri state tournament. This followed a first-place finish in April, 2010 at the Missouri state tournament by the junior varsity quiz bowl team. The KHS Academic Team, or "Quiz Bowl" has advanced to the state competition nine times, occurring in 1997, 2000, 2001, 2004, 2006, 2007, 2008, 2010, 2013, and 2014. The Science Olympiad teams have qualified for state competition every year since 1998.

=== Athletics ===
A moderate-size school district, Kirksville is classified as a 3A school according to the Missouri State High School Activities Association. The Tiger athletic teams compete in the North Central Missouri Conference (NCMC). Kirksville High School has won four state championships; boys tennis in 1984, baseball in 1995, and wrestling in 2009 and 2012. Additionally, the Kirksville wrestling program has produced several individual state champions in varying weight classes from the 1970s through 2012. Among them are Justin VanHoose, who won four state championships—a feat accomplished by only 20 other high school wrestlers in Missouri history, three-time state champions Austin Roper and Travis Lang, and two-time state champ Colton Schmitz.

=== State championships ===
State Championships
Season	Sport	Number of Championships	Year
Winter	Wrestling	2	2009, 2012
Spring	Tennis, Boys	1	1984
Spring	Baseball	1	1995
Total		4	

Kirksville High School offers the following sports:

=== Fall ===
- Football
- Volleyball
- Boys Cross-Country
- Girls Cross-Country
- Girls Golf
- Boys Soccer
- Softball
- Girls Tennis
- Cheerleading

=== Winter ===
- Boys Basketball
- Girls Basketball
- Wrestling
- Winter Cheerleading

=== Spring ===
- Baseball
- Boys Golf
- Boys Tennis
- Girls Soccer
- Boys Track and Field
- Girls Track and Field

== Traditions ==
The Senior Tile: The Senior Tile was a donation to the school by the Class Of 1962, the first to graduate from the current building. The Tiger Tile is a 2' by 2' square floor tile featuring a Tiger, located between the main office and library.

The Seniors' Last Day of School The last day of school for Seniors typically occurs two weeks before the end of the school year. On the last day of school the seniors participate in several traditions. For instance, tradition states that on the last day of school for the Senior Class that Seniors block off the parking lot adjacent to both the High School and the Kirksville Area Technical School, or Vo-Tech. Other lesser traditions include: a Senior Skip day, a Senior Bar-B-Que in the parking lot, and various Senior Pranks.

Courtwarming: Courtwarming was first held at Kirksville High School during the 1982–83 school year. Often seen as a winter companion to the football Homecoming, Courtwarming is a time to honor basketball teams, the wrestling program, volleyball teams, Academic team, and Science Olympiad teams. The week leading up to the games are filled with activities including spirit days and a pep rally. A dance traditionally follows the Courtwarming basketball games.

== Clubs ==
Kirksville High School provides students with clubs and organizations in which to participate, including: Student Council, Makers Club, Interact, National Honor Society, Model United Nations, Film Club, Amnesty International, GSA (Gay-Straight Alliance), FBLA (Future Business Leaders of America), FCA (Fellowship of Christian Athletes), Future Teachers of America, Anime, Masque & Gavel, Science, and Stem Club.

== Feeder patterns ==
Other schools in the district include the Kirksville Middle School (grades 6, 7, & 8), Ray Miller Elementary (grades 3, 4, & 5) and Kirksville Primary School (grades K, 1, & 2). All schools, along with the R-3 District offices are located on a large tract of land in southeast Kirksville.
