= Salt River Township, Adair County, Missouri =

Salt River Township
- Township
- Coordinates: 40°09′34″N 092°25′07″W
- Country: United States
- State: Missouri
- County: Adair

Area
  - Total: 56.16 sq mi (145.45 km^{2})
  - Land: 56.15 sq mi (145.43 km^{2})
  - Water: 0.0077 sq mi (0.02 km^{2}) 0.02%
- Elevation: 873 ft (266 m)

Population (2010)
  - Total: 1,043
  - Density: 19/sq mi (7.2/km^{2})
- FIPS code: 29-65540
- GNIS feature ID: 0766217

Salt River Township is one of ten townships in Adair County, Missouri, United States. As of the 2010 census, its population was 1,043. Salt River Township was named from one its principal streams.

== Geography ==
Salt River Township covers an area of 56.1 square miles (145.4 km^{2}) and contains one incorporated settlement, Brashear. It contains two cemeteries: Brashear and Paultown.

The streams of Battle Creek, Brushy Fork, Hog Branch, Lost Creek, Steer Creek and Timber Branch run through this township.
