= Sedan, Iowa =

- Unincorporated community
- Location within Iowa
- Coordinates: 40°39′25″N 92°50′01″W
- Country: United States
- State: Iowa
- County: Appanoose
- Elevation: 945 ft (288 m)
- Time zone: UTC-6 (Central (CST))
  - Summer (DST): UTC-5 (CDT)
- Area code: 641
- GNIS feature ID: 464332

Sedan is an unincorporated community in Appanoose County, Iowa, United States.

== History ==
Sedan was located at the junction of two railroads. In 1878, Sedan contained two businesses: a store and saloon under one roof, and a depot building.

Sedan's population was 27 in 1925. The population was 40 in 1940.
