= Kirksville R-III School District =

School district in Missouri, U.S.

Address
- 1901 East Hamilton Street Kirksville, Missouri, 63501; United States

District information
- Type: Public
- Grades: PreK–12
- NCES District ID: 2916740

Students and staff
- Students: 2,446
- Teachers: 201.37
- Staff: 122.01
- Student–teacher ratio: 12.15

Other information
- Website: www.kirksville.k12.mo.us

Kirksville R-III School District or Kirksville Public Schools is a school district headquartered in Kirksville, Missouri.

Located in Adair County, the district includes Kirksville, Millard, and the county's part of Greentop.

As of the 2016–2017 school year the district had 2,464 students and 430 employees, including 222 teachers.

== Demographics ==
Prior to 2015 about half of its 20-25 English as a second language program students were of Hispanic origin. By 2015 a large number of students from the Democratic Republic of the Congo appeared in Kirksville, doubling the number of ESOL students and giving it a French-speaking population not previously present. Therefore, the district began expanding its ESOL program.

== Schools ==
- Kirksville High School
- William Matthew Middle School
- Ray Miller Elementary School
- Kirksville Primary School
- Early Childhood Learning Center
