= Wilson Township, Adair County, Missouri =

Wilson Township, Missouri
- Township
- Coordinates: 40°05′12″N 092°26′03″W
- Country: United States
- State: Missouri
- County: Adair

Area
  - Total: 54.16 sq mi (140.28 km^{2})
  - Land: 54.14 sq mi (140.23 km^{2})
  - Water: 0.019 sq mi (0.05 km^{2}) 0.03%
- Elevation: 902 ft (275 m)

Population (2010)
  - Total: 503
  - Density: 9.3/sq mi (3.6/km^{2})
- FIPS code: 29-80134
- GNIS feature ID: 0766219

Wilson Township is one of ten townships in Adair County, Missouri, United States. As of the 2010 census, its population was 503. It is named for Joseph Wilson, an early judge in Adair County.

== Geography ==
Wilson Township covers an area of 54.2 square miles (140.3 km^{2}) and contains one incorporated settlement, Gibbs. It contains one cemetery, Gibbs Union.
