= Morrow Township, Adair County, Missouri =

Morrow Township, Missouri
- Township
- Coordinates: 40°17′02″N 092°47′32″W
- Country: United States
- State: Missouri
- County: Adair

Area
  - Total: 53.39 sq mi (138.27 km^{2})
  - Land: 53.37 sq mi (138.22 km^{2})
  - Water: 0.019 sq mi (0.05 km^{2}) 0.04%
- Elevation: 797 ft (243 m)

Population (2010)
  - Total: 431
  - Density: 8.0/sq mi (3.1/km^{2})
- FIPS code: 29-50096
- GNIS feature ID: 0766213

Morrow Township is one of ten townships in Adair County, Missouri, United States. As of the 2010 census, its population was 431. It is named for John Morrow, one of Adair County's original judges.

== Geography ==
Morrow Township covers an area of 53.39 square miles (138.27 km^{2}) and contains no incorporated settlements. It contains eight cemeteries: Branstutter, Broyles, Campbell, Cox, Daniels, Megrew, Morelock and Shibleys Point.

The streams of Pleasant Creek, Plum Branch and Turkey Creek run through this township.
