= Troy Mills, Missouri =

Unincorporated community in Missouri, U.S.

Coordinates: 40°08′48″N 92°36′02″W

Troy Mills is an unincorporated community in Adair County, in the U.S. state of Missouri.

== History ==
A post office called Troy Mills was established in 1868, and remained in operation until 1879. The community took its name from a nearby woolen mill.
