= Adair County R-1 School District =

School district in Missouri, U.S.

Adair County R-1
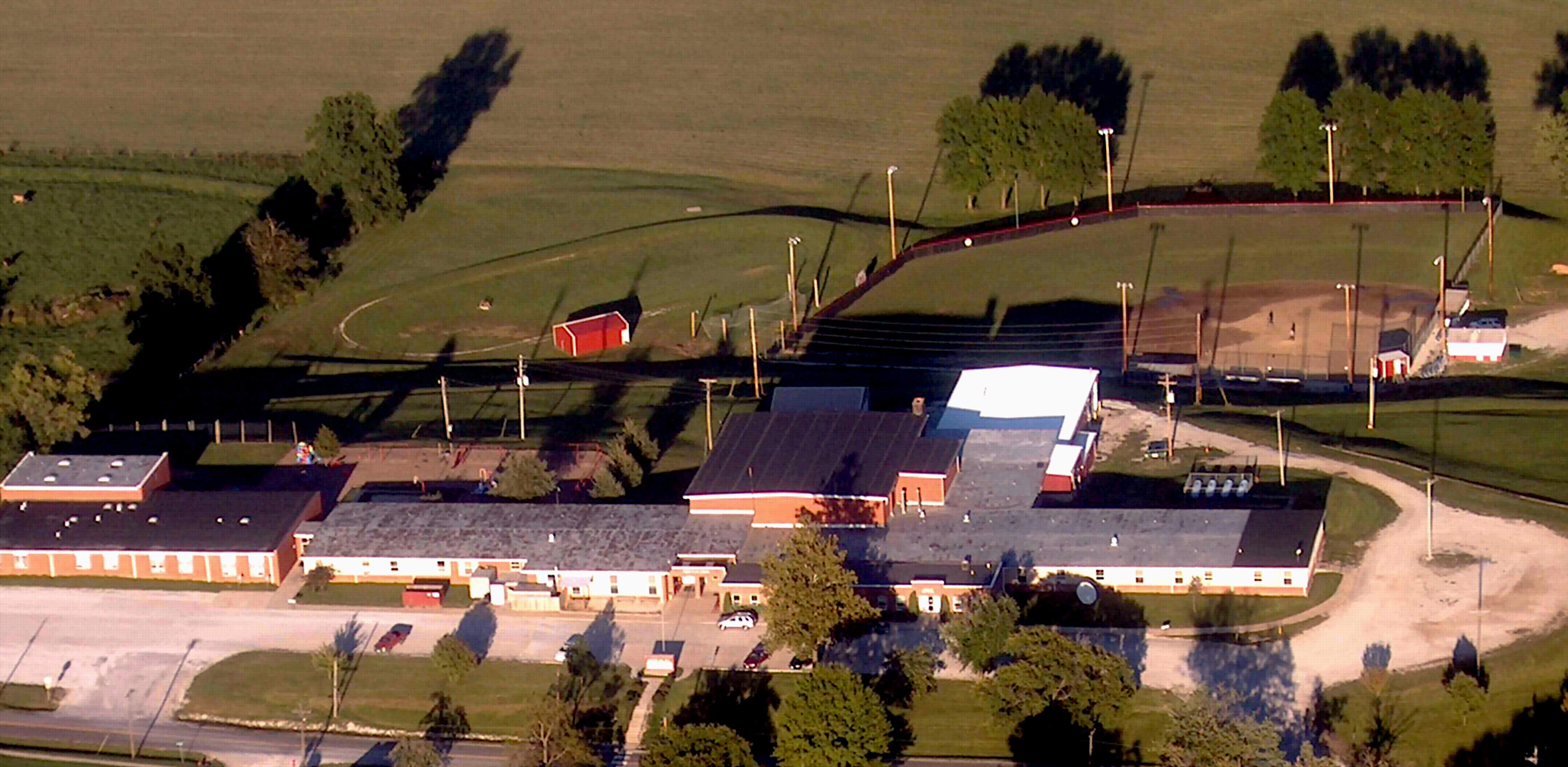

Address
- 600 Rombauer Avenue Novinger, Missouri, 63559; United States
- Coordinates: 40°14′05″N 92°42′13″W

District information
- Type: Public / Reorganized district
- Motto: Preparing Students for Success
- Grades: Pre-Kindergarten through 12th grade
- Established: 1953; 73 years ago
- Superintendent: Robin Daniels
- NCES District ID: 2922980

Students and staff
- Enrollment: 260(2011-2012)
- Student–teacher ratio: 9.34
- Athletic conference: Tri-County Conference
- District mascot: Wildcat
- Colors: Red and white

Other information
- Telephone: 660.488.6411
- Website: www.novinger.k12.mo.us

Adair County R-1 School District, also known as Novinger R-1, is a public school district located in Adair County, Missouri. It serves a largely rural population in western Adair County, along with the town of Novinger, Missouri, providing pre-Kindergarten through 12th grade education.

In addition to Novinger, the district includes Connelsville.

== History ==
The district was formed in the early 1950s as part of Missouri's Education Reformation Act. Eight smaller districts, often one-room schools, were reorganized and combined with the Novinger school to create the current district. The current physical plant was constructed in 1953–1954, with major additions in the early 1970s and late 1990s. It houses a preschool along with grades K-6 on the northern end of the building, while grades 7-12 occupy the southern end. A common cafeteria area in the center serves all students. Adair County R-1 participates in the state of Missouri's A+ education program.

== Athletics and extracurricular activities ==
Adair County R-1 competes in Missouri Class 1A athletics as determined by the Missouri State High School Activities Association. The school is a charter member of the Tri-County athletic conference, competing in boys & girls high school and junior high basketball, high school baseball and softball, and high school and junior high track. Additionally, the athletic booster club sponsors 5th and 6th-grade basketball teams.

=== Mascot history ===
The teams' mascot and nickname, the Wildcats, has its roots in the mid-1920s. The 1925-26 boys basketball team was one of the most successful in school history, reaching the "Elite 8" in the Missouri state high school tournament after beating much larger schools like Kirksville and Moberly. At first the word was split, Wild Cats, which was 1920s slang for "crazy guys" or "cool guys"; however by the end of the decade the word had been consolidated and linked to the animal. Wildcats are not native to Missouri, but a close cousin, the Bobcat can be found in substantial numbers in the Chariton River valley around Novinger and elsewhere in northeast Missouri. Novinger and other small schools in the area were some of the first in the state to have girls' basketball teams. The Novinger girls began using "Wild Kittens" around the same time as the boys adopted their name, and would continue to be known as such until the mid-1970s when "Lady Wildcats" was put into usage.

Among the extracurricular activities offered are: FBLA, FFA, Cadet teaching, varsity and junior varsity Academic teams, National Honor Society, Choir, and Band. The Novinger band has consistently received high marks over the years with several first-place finishes at parades in Missouri and Iowa, and several "1" ratings for concert band excellence in Missouri district music contests. In 2011, the band was invited to participate in the 38th annual Kansas City St. Patrick's Day parade, one of the largest in the United States.

== Notable alumni ==
- Zachary Wyatt, 2nd District Rep., Missouri House of Representatives (2011–2013). During his time in the House, Wyatt was the only openly gay Republican legislator serving anywhere in the United States.
- Brent Truitt, Grammy Award-winning music producer and member of The SteelDrivers.
The first Novinger school building. Photo taken around 1907.

The second Novinger school. Destroyed by fire in 1953.

Novinger "Cadets" drumline perform their trash can drum drill at many northeast Missouri basketball tournaments, fairs, and festivals each year.
