= Chariton Township, Schuyler County, Missouri =

Inactive township in the US state of Missouri

Coordinates: 40.5592°N 92.6247°W

Chariton Township is an inactive township in Schuyler County, in the U.S. state of Missouri. Chariton Township was erected in 1843 in the northwestern corner of the county, and named after the Chariton River.
