= Polk Township, Adair County, Missouri =

Polk Township, Missouri
- Township
- Coordinates: 40°18′56″N 092°34′02″W
- Country: United States
- State: Missouri
- County: Adair

Area
  - Total: 29.96 sq mi (77.60 km^{2})
  - Land: 29.29 sq mi (75.86 km^{2})
  - Water: 0.67 sq mi (1.74 km^{2}) 2.24%
- Elevation: 950 ft (290 m)

Population (2010)
  - Total: 639
  - Density: 22/sq mi (8.4/km^{2})
- FIPS code: 29-58682
- GNIS feature ID: 0766216

Polk Township is one of ten townships in Adair County, Missouri, United States. As of the 2010 census, its population was 639. It is named for US President James K. Polk.

== Geography ==
Polk Township covers an area of 30.0 square miles (77.6 km^{2}) and contains no incorporated settlements.

The stream of Buck Branch runs through this township.
