= Nineveh, Missouri =

Unincorporated community in Missouri, U.S.

Coordinates: 40°16′27″N 92°41′41″W

Nineveh is an unincorporated community in Nineveh Township, Adair County, Missouri, United States.

== History ==
Nineveh was founded in 1849 by a small colony of German settlers from Bethel, Missouri who wanted to create a communal society. A post office called Nineveh was established in 1852, and remained in operation until 1882. The community was named after the ancient city of Nineveh.
