= Lickskillet, Missouri =

Unincorporated community in Missouri, United States

Coordinates: 40°26′40″N 92°42′40″W

Lickskillet is an extinct town in Putnam County, in the U.S. state of Missouri. The GNIS classifies it as a populated place.

A variant name was "Mapleton". A post office called Mapleton was established in 1891, and remained in operation until 1909. The Mapleton School, now defunct, served the area.
