= Salt River Township, Schuyler County, Missouri =

Township in Schuyler County, Missouri, U.S.

Coordinates: 40.3653°N 92.5814°W

Salt River Township is an inactive township in Schuyler County, in the U.S. state of Missouri.

Salt River Township most likely takes its name from the North Fork Salt River. It is located in the southwest corner of the county.
