= Novinger, Missouri =

City in Adair County, Missouri, United States

- City
- Location within Adair County (left) and Missouri (right)
- Coordinates: 40°14′03″N 92°42′24″W
- Country: United States
- State: Missouri
- County: Adair
- Township: Nineveh
- Established: 1878

Government
  - Type: Mayor & Council
  - Mayor: Jeff Dodson

Area
  - Total: 0.80 sq mi (2.08 km^{2})
  - Land: 0.79 sq mi (2.04 km^{2})
  - Water: 0.015 sq mi (0.04 km^{2})
- Elevation: 837 ft (255 m)

Population (2020)
  - Total: 383
  - Density: 486.7/sq mi (187.91/km^{2})
- Time zone: UTC-6 (Central (CST))
  - Summer (DST): UTC-5 (CDT)
- ZIP code: 63559
- Area code: 660
- FIPS code: 29-53534
- GNIS feature ID: 2395279
- Website: www.cityofnovinger.com

Novinger (/ˈnɒvɪndʒər/ NOV-in-jər) is a city in Nineveh Township, Adair County, Missouri, United States. The population was 383 at the 2020 census.

== History ==
Key events in Novinger history include the arrival of the Quincy, Missouri & Pacific railroad and filing of the town plat by founder John C. Novinger in 1878, the establishment of a U.S. Post Office the next year, and the first shaft coal mine in 1883. A turn-of-the-century coal mining boom saw Welsh, Germans, Scots-Irish, Italians, natives of the Balkan countries and many others and their families immigrate from all over the world. It was this boom that finally saw Novinger incorporated as a city in 1901 as the population swelled into the thousands. However, the Great Depression, a post-World War II switch to mostly natural gas and electric heat in American homes, and heavy industry's lessening coal use doomed the area coal fields. The railroads had pulled out by 1950, and the last mine, Billy Creek Coal Mine southwest of Novinger, closed in January 1966. At the time of its closing Billy Creek was the last operating deep shaft mine in Missouri.

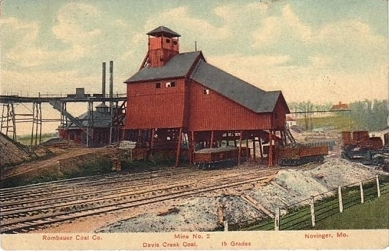
Rombauer Coal Mine, one of the multitude operating in the Novinger area at the turn of the 20th century.

Novinger versus Nature: Being a river town, Novinger was no stranger to frequent flooding of the Chariton River during the community's early years. However a channelization of the Chariton by the U.S. Army Corps of Engineers in the 1950s alleviated much of the threat. But in June 2008 a series of heavy rains led to flooding of the Chariton, and more significantly, let flash flood waters of Spring Creek and Davis Creek to back up from the river into Novinger. Several homes in the low-lying southwestern part of town were heavily damaged, as was the historic 1800s log homestead and Novinger Community Center. On May 13, 2009, a large tornado, estimated as a strong EF2 on the Enhanced Fujita scale, struck the southern edge of Novinger. At least six homes were destroyed, along with two brick buildings in the business district. The tornado caused moderate-to-severe damage to over fifty homes and businesses. Fortunately only minor injuries to residents were reported. Additionally, other homes and barns were also badly damaged or destroyed in rural Adair County southwest of Novinger. Adding insult to injury two days later on May 15 heavy rains once again caused severe flash flooding to Novinger's low-lying areas, including once again the Novinger Community Center and log homestead -— both of which had only recently been repaired from damage suffered in the June 2008 flood. The combination of tornado and flood forced the first-ever cancellation of Novingers annual Coal Miner Days celebration as well as postponement of graduation ceremonies at Novinger R-1 High School.

Late on the night of September 11, 2010 a major fire swept through the Novinger business district. Five buildings, including the former city hall and senior citizen center were destroyed, as well as two businesses.

=== Novinger today ===
The Novinger business community is but a fraction of its size during the coal boom days. The town proper and surrounding area offer two beauty salons, two construction companies, two convenience stores, a catering business, farm supply store, heating and cooling repair, and auction service. Most Novinger residents however must travel to the larger city of Kirksville to the east or Milan to the west for employment, thus making Novinger largely a bedroom community.

Recent improvements to the town include storm warning capability, upgraded water system, and upgrades to the community center and community fairgrounds. In 2011 an outdoor basketball court was constructed with the assistance of Toolbox Ministries, a traveling Christian-based community betterment organization. Fire protection for the community is provided by a well-equipped volunteer fire department. At various times Novinger has employed a town marshal, but the majority of law enforcement protection comes from the county sheriff's department and state patrol.

Recreation activities include deer and turkey hunting, along with fishing in the nearby lakes, ponds and the Chariton River, boating and waterskiing at Thousand Hills State Park, four miles east of Novinger. There is a reconstructed historic log homestead and Coal Miners’ Museum. A community center hosts private functions and annual town celebrations. Novinger Renewal Inc., Novinger Planned Progress, and the Novinger Lions Club are three civic organizations. In October 2012, Novinger received two first place honors from the Missouri Community Betterment Organization. A Novinger youth group received one of the awards, while the town as a whole received first place in the overall community betterment category. The year 2012 marked the third consecutive in which Novinger had received awards from Missouri Community Betterment.

The Cabins Historic District near Novinger was listed on the National Register of Historic Places in 1979.

== Geography ==
Novinger is located at the intersection of Missouri routes 6 and 149 approximately six miles west-northwest of Kirksville. The confluence of Spring Creek and the Chariton River is one mile southeast.

According to the United States Census Bureau, the city has a total area of 0.80 square miles (2.07 km^{2}), of which 0.79 square miles (2.05 km^{2}) is land and 0.01 square miles (0.03 km^{2}) is water.

== Demographics ==
Historical population
Census	Pop.	Note	%±
1880	32		—
1910	1,711		—
1920	1,743		1.9%
1930	846		−51.5%
1940	793		−6.3%
1950	734		−7.4%
1960	621		−15.4%
1970	547		−11.9%
1980	626		14.4%
1990	542		−13.4%
2000	534		−1.5%
2010	456		−14.6%
2020	383		−16.0%
U.S. Decennial Census

Novinger is part of the Kirksville Micropolitan Statistical Area.

=== 2010 census ===
As of the census of 2010, there were 456 people, 206 households, and 124 families residing in the city. The population density was 577.2 inhabitants per square mile (222.9/km^{2}). There were 246 housing units at an average density of 311.4 per square mile (120.2/km^{2}). The racial makeup of the city was 98.7% White, 0.7% Native American, and 0.7% from two or more races. Hispanic or Latino of any race were 0.2% of the population.

There were 206 households, of which 24.3% had children under the age of 18 living with them, 47.1% were married couples living together, 6.3% had a female householder with no husband present, 6.8% had a male householder with no wife present, and 39.8% were non-families. 35.9% of all households were made up of individuals, and 16.5% had someone living alone who was 65 years of age or older. The average household size was 2.21 and the average family size was 2.89.

The median age in the city was 44.5 years. 21.3% of residents were under the age of 18; 8.7% were between the ages of 18 and 24; 20.7% were from 25 to 44; 32% were from 45 to 64; and 17.3% were 65 years of age or older. The gender makeup of the city was 51.5% male and 48.5% female.

=== 2000 census ===
As of the census of 2000, there were 534 people, 225 households, and 152 families residing in the city. The population density was 662.7 inhabitants per square mile (255.9/km^{2}). There were 246 housing units at an average density of 305.3 per square mile (117.9/km^{2}). The racial makeup of the city was 99.25% White and 0.75% Native American. Hispanic or Latino of any race were 1.50% of the population.

There were 225 households, out of which 33.3% had children under the age of 18 living with them, 51.1% were married couples living together, 12.0% had a female householder with no husband present, and 32.4% were non-families. 29.8% of all households were made up of individuals, and 15.1% had someone living alone who was 65 years of age or older. The average household size was 2.37 and the average family size was 2.95.

In the city the population was spread out, with 25.1% under the age of 18, 10.9% from 18 to 24, 24.3% from 25 to 44, 25.1% from 45 to 64, and 14.6% who were 65 years of age or older. The median age was 37 years. For every 100 females, there were 103.0 males. For every 100 females age 18 and over, there were 93.2 males.

The median income for a household in the city was $20,990, and the median income for a family was $26,000. Males had a median income of $19,500 versus $17,625 for females. The per capita income for the city was $10,586. About 14.9% of families and 15.6% of the population were below the poverty line, including 19.7% of those under age 18 and 15.8% of those age 65 or over.

== Education ==
Education for the town, and much of western Adair County, is provided by the Adair County R-1 school district. The school facility is located on Missouri Highway 149 in Novinger.

== Annual events ==
- Coal Miner Days was held from 1987 - 2013 over Memorial Day weekend and included a parade, games, food, and entertainment. The event is no longer being held.
- Labor Day weekend the Novinger Lions Club hosted a celebration with parade, music, food and games. The last celebration was held in 2017.
- Novinger Renewal's Country Christmas Craft Festival is held in both gyms and all the hallways of the school on the Saturday before Thanksgiving, which features a bake sale with homemade candy and a food stand. The Holiday Bazaar, featuring antiques, collectibles, commercial products and crafts is held at the Community Center on the same day, and Shopper's Delight also takes place at the Firehouse.
- The week after Thanksgiving includes the annual Novinger Invitational basketball tournament.

== Notable people ==
- Zachary Wyatt, 2nd District Representative, Missouri House of Representatives (2011–2013).

== Gallery ==
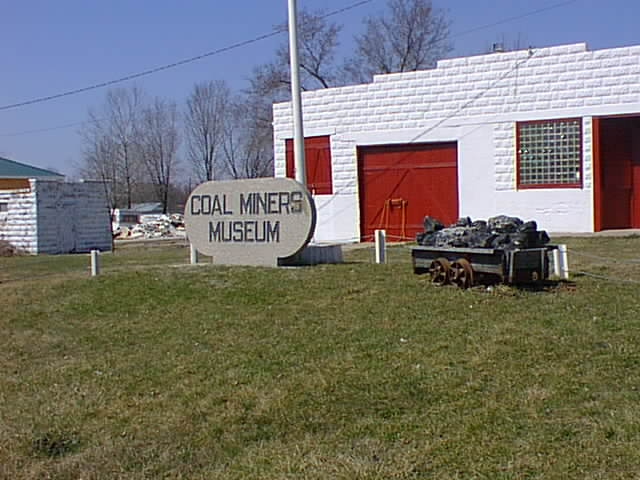
Novinger Coal Miners Museum.

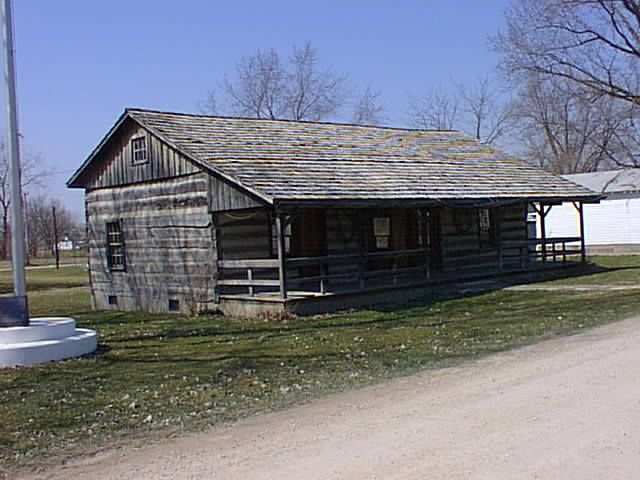
Restored Isaac & Samuel Novinger log cabin, Novinger Missouri.

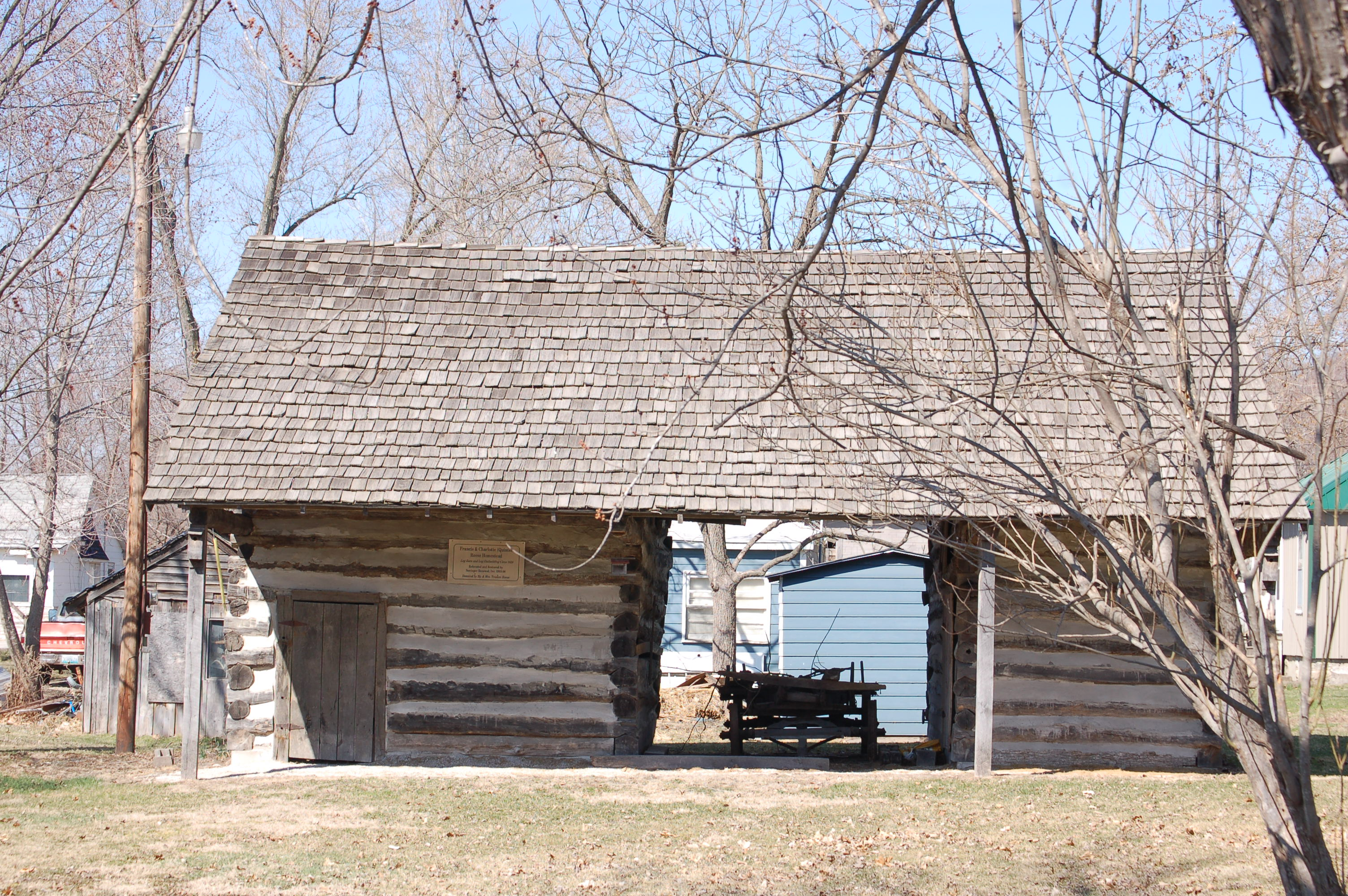
The Reese Family log barn, part of the Novinger log homestead.

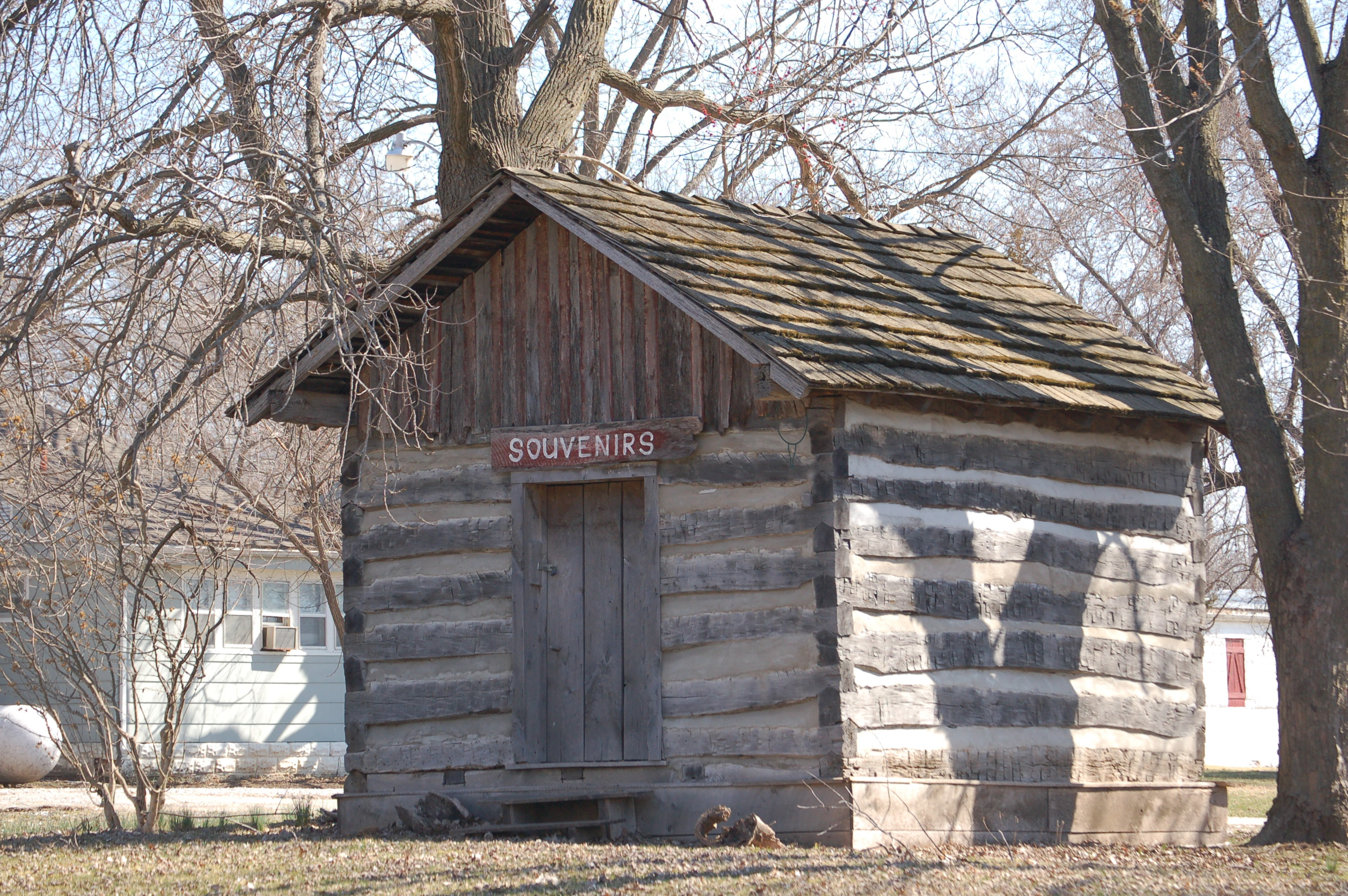
Log smokehouse and gift shop, Novinger log homestead.

== See also ==
- List of cities in Missouri
