= Adair County, Missouri =

County in Missouri, United States

- County
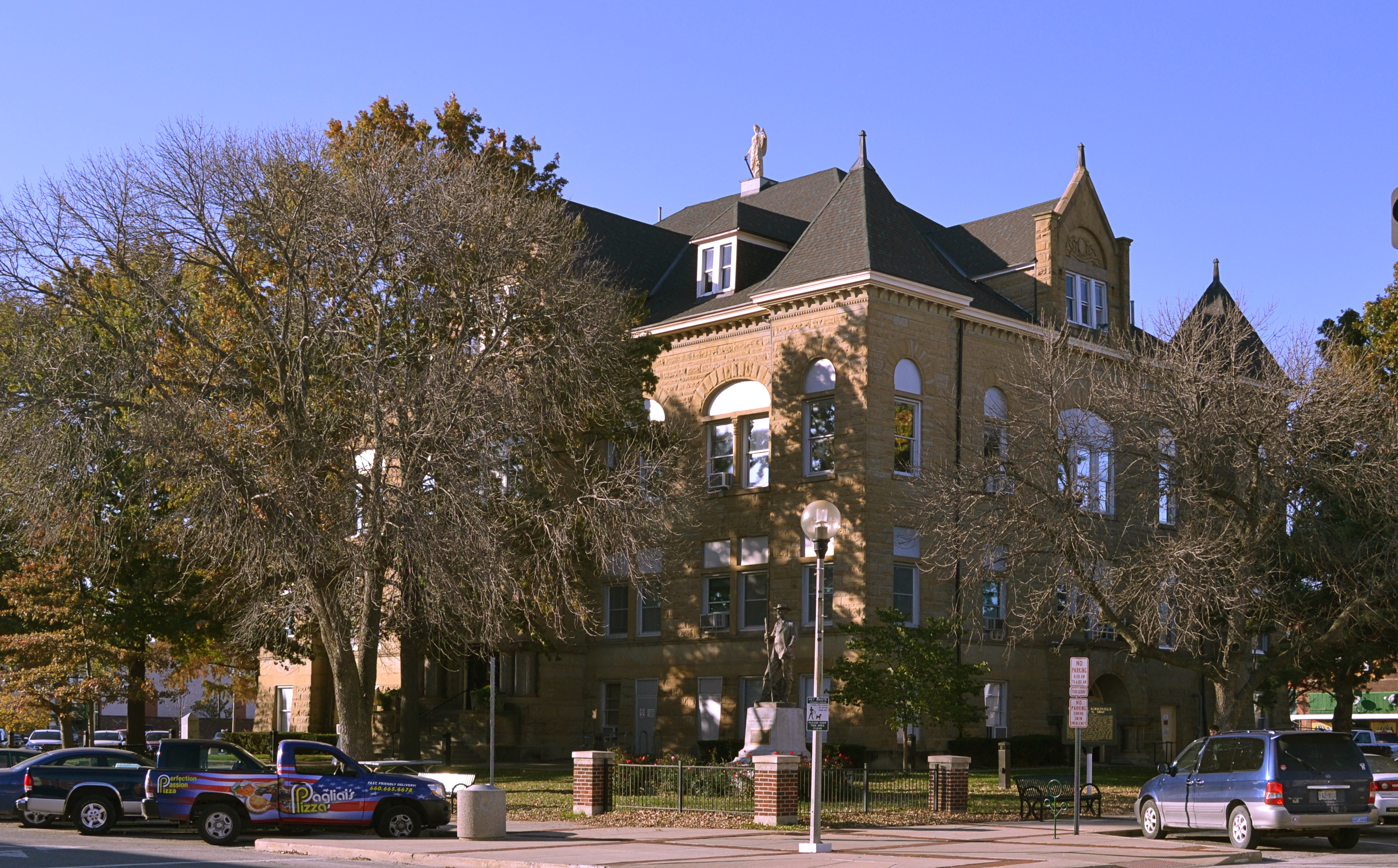
- Adair County Courthouse in Kirksville

- Seal

- Location within the U.S. state of Missouri
- Coordinates: 40°11′N 92°36′W
- Country: United States
- State: Missouri
- Founded: January 29, 1841
- Named for: Adair County, Kentucky
- Seat: Kirksville
- Largest city: Kirksville

Area
  - Total: 569 sq mi (1,470 km^{2})
  - Land: 567 sq mi (1,470 km^{2})
  - Water: 2.1 sq mi (5.4 km^{2}) 0.4%

Population (2020)
  - Total: 25,314
  - Estimate (2025): 25,684 ▲
  - Density: 44.6/sq mi (17.2/km^{2})
- Time zone: UTC−6 (Central)
  - Summer (DST): UTC−5 (CDT)
- Congressional district: 6th
- Website: adaircountymissouri.com

Adair County (/əˈdɛər/ ə-DAIR) is a county located in the northeastern part of the U.S. state of Missouri. The population census for 2020 was 25,314. The county seat is Kirksville. The county was first settled by immigrants from Kentucky and organized on January 29, 1841. Adair County comprises the Kirksville, MO Micropolitan Statistical Area.

== History ==
The first permanent settlement in Adair County began in 1828. Many of the first settlers were from Adair County in Kentucky, for which the Missouri county was named. The county in Kentucky was named for John Adair, a respected Governor of Kentucky. This was 25 years after the Louisiana Purchase, seven years after Missouri was granted statehood, and four years after the Sac and Fox Native American tribes surrendered their claims to the land. The original settlement was called "Cabins of White Folks," or, "The Cabins," and was located six miles (9.7 km) west of present-day Kirksville along the Chariton River.

The Big Neck War: In July 1829, a large party of Iowa (or Ioway) Native Americans, led by Chief Big Neck, returned to their former hunting grounds in violation of treaty. One of the Ioway's dogs killed a pig, and some tribe members threatened (or insulted, according to some sources) the white women. The settlers sent messengers south to Randolph and Macon counties asking for help. Captain William Trammell responded with a party of some two dozen men to help. By the time of their arrival, the Ioways had left the area and moved up the Chariton into what is now Schuyler County. Trammell's force, augmented by several of the men from The Cabins, pursued and engaged the Ioway at a place called Battle Creek, killing several Native Americans including Big Neck's brother, sister-in-law, and their child. The Trammell party lost three men in the skirmish, including Captain Trammell himself, and one additional casualty died of his wounds shortly afterward. The surviving whites returned to the cabins, collected the women and children, and headed south for the Randolph County settlement of Huntsville. Later, a group of militia under General John B. Clark pursued and apprehended Big Neck and his braves, capturing them in March 1830. Several of them soon escaped from jail and fled to the current state of Iowa; however, Big Neck himself and the remainder were put on trial by a grand jury convened in Randolph County. The jury found on March 31, 1830, that: "After examining all the witnesses, and maturely considering the charges for which these Iowa Indians are now in confinement, we find them not guilty, and they are at once discharged." The acquittal of Big Neck seemed to have brought the war to a peaceful, if uneasy, conclusion. A few months later, white settlers returned to The Cabins in greater numbers than before, and this time to stay permanently. The outbreak of the Blackhawk War in 1832 again caused consternation among the early settlers although all fighting was hundreds of miles away in present-day Illinois and Wisconsin. To ease fears in the area, militia units were dispatched and two small forts were constructed. One, Fort Clark, was located on high ground adjacent to The Cabins. Several miles to the northeast, another detachment of troops established Fort Matson. After months of no hostile Native American activity in the Adair County area, both forts were abandoned. The site of Fort Clark is now marked by a large boulder and plaque, while the Fort Matson site was later the location for a church and its name corrupted to Fort Madison (not to be confused with the Iowa city). The Fort Matson/Madison Cemetery remains.

=== Courthouse ===
The Adair County courthouse is a three-story Romanesque structure in the center of the Kirksville city square that was completed in 1899. The architect was Robert G. Kirsch who would later also design the courthouses for Carroll, Polk, Vernon, and Cooper counties. The county had no dedicated courthouse from 1865 until 1899, operating out of temporary rented quarters on or near the square. The county voters finally approved a $50,000 bond issue in 1897 to build the current courthouse after four failed attempts between 1872 and 1896. The courthouse was placed on the National Register of Historic Places in 1978.

== Geography ==
According to the U.S. Census Bureau, the county has a total area of 569 square miles (1,470 km^{2}), of which 567 square miles (1,470 km^{2}) is land and 2.1 square miles (5.4 km^{2}) (0.4%) is water.

=== Rivers ===
- Floyd Creek

=== Adjacent counties ===
- Putnam County (northwest)
- Schuyler County (north)
- Scotland County (northeast)
- Knox County (east)
- Macon County (south)
- Linn County (southwest)
- Sullivan County (west)

=== Major highways ===
- U.S. Route 63
- Route 3
- Route 6
- Route 11
- Route 149
- Route 157

=== Transit ===
- Kirk-Tran

=== Railroads ===
- BNSF Railway

== Demographics ==
Historical population
Census	Pop.	Note	%±
1850	2,283		—
1860	8,436		269.5%
1870	11,448		35.7%
1880	15,190		32.7%
1890	17,417		14.7%
1900	21,728		24.8%
1910	22,700		4.5%
1920	21,404		−5.7%
1930	19,436		−9.2%
1940	20,246		4.2%
1950	19,689		−2.8%
1960	20,105		2.1%
1970	22,472		11.8%
1980	24,870		10.7%
1990	24,577		−1.2%
2000	24,977		1.6%
2010	25,607		2.5%
2020	25,314		−1.1%
2025 (est.)	25,684	▲	1.5%
U.S. Decennial Census; 1790-1960 1900-1990; 1990-2000 2010-2015

=== 2020 census ===
Adair County, Missouri – Racial and ethnic composition Note: the US Census treats Hispanic/Latino as an ethnic category. This table excludes Latinos from the racial categories and assigns them to a separate category. Hispanics/Latinos may be of any race.
Race / Ethnicity (NH = Non-Hispanic)	Pop 1980	Pop 1990	Pop 2000	Pop 2010	Pop 2020	% 1980	% 1990	% 2000	% 2010	% 2020
White alone (NH)	24,083	23,919	23,738	23,751	21,590	96.84%	97.32%	95.04%	92.75%	85.29%
Black or African American alone (NH)	310	213	291	392	1,265	1.25%	0.87%	1.17%	1.53%	5.00%
Native American or Alaska Native alone (NH)	30	39	57	72	41	0.12%	0.16%	0.23%	0.28%	0.16%
Asian alone (NH)	212	218	347	453	685	0.85%	0.89%	1.39%	1.77%	2.71%
Native Hawaiian or Pacific Islander alone (NH)	x	x	11	12	13	x	x	0.04%	0.05%	0.05%
Other race alone (NH)	99	6	13	14	50	0.40%	0.02%	0.05%	0.05%	0.20%
Mixed race or Multiracial (NH)	x	x	205	390	1,009	x	x	0.82%	1.52%	3.99%
Hispanic or Latino (any race)	136	182	315	523	661	0.55%	0.74%	1.26%	2.04%	2.61%
Total	24,870	24,577	24,977	25,607	25,314	100.00%	100.00%	100.00%	100.00%	100.00%

As of the 2020 census, the county had a population of 25,314. The median age was 30.5 years, 19.2% of residents were under the age of 18, and 15.8% were 65 years of age or older. For every 100 females there were 93.4 males, and for every 100 females age 18 and over there were 90.9 males age 18 and over.

66.5% of residents lived in urban areas, while 33.5% lived in rural areas.

The racial makeup of the county was 86.3% White, 5.1% Black or African American, 0.2% American Indian and Alaska Native, 2.7% Asian, 0.1% Native Hawaiian and Pacific Islander, 0.9% from some other race, and 4.8% from two or more races. Hispanic or Latino residents of any race comprised 2.6% of the population. The table above summarizes the county's 2020 racial and ethnic data.

There were 9,886 households in the county, of which 25.1% had children under the age of 18 living with them and 30.0% had a female householder with no spouse or partner present. About 34.6% of all households were made up of individuals and 12.3% had someone living alone who was 65 years of age or older.

There were 11,338 housing units, of which 12.8% were vacant. Among occupied housing units, 56.9% were owner-occupied and 43.1% were renter-occupied. The homeowner vacancy rate was 1.6% and the rental vacancy rate was 7.8%.

=== 2000 census ===
As of the census of 2000, there were 24,977 people, 9,669 households, and 5,346 families residing in the county. The population density was 44 inhabitants per square mile (17/km^{2}). There were 10,826 housing units at an average density of 19 units per square mile (7.3 units/km^{2}). The racial makeup of the county was 95.82% White, 1.20% Black or African American, 0.26% Native American, 1.39% Asian, 0.05% Pacific Islander, 0.41% from other races, and 0.88% from two or more races. Approximately 1.26% of the population were Hispanic or Latino of any race.

There were 9,669 households, out of which 25.20% had children under the age of 18 living with them, 45.50% were married couples living together, 7.20% had a female householder with no husband present, and 44.70% were non-families. 31.50% of all households were made up of individuals, and 10.50% had someone living alone who was 65 years of age or older. The average household size was 2.29 and the average family size was 2.90.

In the county, the population was spread out, with 19.20% under the age of 18, 27.40% from 18 to 24, 22.80% from 25 to 44, 18.40% from 45 to 64, and 12.30% who were 65 years of age or older. The median age was 28 years. For every 100 females, there were 88.20 males. For every 100 females age 18 and over, there were 84.50 males.

The median income for a household in the county was $26,677, and the median income for a family was $38,085. Males had a median income of $26,323 versus $21,837 for females. The per capita income for the county was $15,484. About 11.90% of families and 23.30% of the population were below the poverty line, including 16.80% of those under age 18 and 12.00% of those age 65 or over.

=== Religion ===
According to the Association of Religion Data Archives County Membership Report (2010), Adair County is sometimes regarded as being on the northern edge of the Bible Belt, with evangelical Protestantism being the most predominant religion. The most predominant denominations among residents in Adair County who adhere to a religion are Southern Baptists (19.73%), United Methodists (14.27%), and Roman Catholics (12.72%).

== Education ==
School districts covering sections of Adair County include: Adair County R-1 School District, Adair County R-II School District, Kirksville R-III School District, and La Plata R-II School District.

=== Public schools ===
- Adair County R-I School District - Novinger
  - Adair County R-I Elementary School (K-06)
  - Adair County R-I High School (07-12)
- Adair County R-II School District - Brashear
  - Adair County R-II Elementary School (K-06)
  - Adair County R-II High School (07-12)
- Kirksville R-III School District - Kirksville
  - Kirksville Primary School (PK-02)
  - Ray Miller Elementary School (03-05)
  - Kirksville Middle School (06-08)
  - Kirksville High School (09-12)
- La Plata R-2 School District - La Plata

− ** La Plata R-2 Elementary School (K-06) − ** La Plata R-2 High School (07-12) − _{** The La Plata R-2 facilities are located in La Plata, Missouri, in northern Macon County, Missouri, however, the district boundaries encompass part of southern Adair County as well.}

=== Private schools ===
- Mary Immaculate Catholic School - Kirksville - (K-08) - Roman Catholic
- Life Church School - Kirksville - (K-12) - Nondenominational Christianity

=== Post-secondary education ===
- A.T. Still University - Kirksville - (Kirksville College of Osteopathic Medicine) - Satellite Campus
- Truman State University - Kirksville - A public, four-year university.
- Moberly Area Community College - Kirksville - A satellite campus of the main community college in Moberly

=== Public libraries ===
- Adair County Public Library

== Communities ==
=== Cities ===
- Brashear
- Greentop (mostly in Schuyler County)
- Kirksville (county seat)
- Novinger

=== Villages ===
- Gibbs
- Millard

=== Unincorporated communities ===
- Adair
- Bullion
- Clay
- Connelsville
- Danforth
- Fegley
- Nind
- Nineveh
- Paultown
- Ringo Point
- Shibleys Point
- Sperry
- Stahl
- Sublette
- Troy Mills
- Willmathsville
- Yarrow
- Youngstown

=== Townships ===
Adair County is divided into ten townships:

- Benton
- Clay
- Liberty
- Morrow
- Nineveh
- Pettis
- Polk
- Salt River
- Walnut
- Wilson

== Politics ==
Presidential election results

United States presidential election results for Adair County, Missouri
Year	Republican		Democratic		Third party(ies)	
Year	No.	%	No.	%	No.	%
1888	2,228	57.87%	1,531	39.77%	91	2.36%
1892	1,953	50.05%	1,039	26.63%	910	23.32%
1896	2,402	50.63%	2,311	48.71%	31	0.65%
1900	2,673	52.91%	2,180	43.15%	199	3.94%
1904	2,791	57.76%	1,687	34.91%	354	7.33%
1908	2,514	51.38%	1,992	40.71%	387	7.91%
1912	1,427	29.16%	1,784	36.46%	1,682	34.38%
1916	2,681	51.10%	2,275	43.36%	291	5.55%
1920	4,861	61.70%	2,534	32.17%	483	6.13%
1924	4,383	53.56%	2,800	34.22%	1,000	12.22%
1928	5,538	65.70%	2,841	33.71%	50	0.59%
1932	2,991	38.54%	4,623	59.57%	146	1.88%
1936	4,685	46.26%	5,315	52.48%	127	1.25%
1940	5,688	53.83%	4,813	45.55%	65	0.62%
1944	4,909	57.48%	3,606	42.22%	26	0.30%
1948	4,024	49.07%	4,136	50.43%	41	0.50%
1952	5,748	63.03%	3,339	36.61%	33	0.36%
1956	5,322	60.89%	3,418	39.11%	0	0.00%
1960	5,469	63.38%	3,160	36.62%	0	0.00%
1964	3,573	45.76%	4,235	54.24%	0	0.00%
1968	4,624	58.82%	2,645	33.65%	592	7.53%
1972	6,157	72.92%	2,286	27.08%	0	0.00%
1976	5,249	57.47%	3,684	40.34%	200	2.19%
1980	5,513	57.90%	3,507	36.83%	502	5.27%
1984	6,430	67.34%	3,119	32.66%	0	0.00%
1988	5,721	61.29%	3,571	38.26%	42	0.45%
1992	4,141	38.92%	4,232	39.77%	2,267	21.31%
1996	4,656	44.78%	4,441	42.71%	1,300	12.50%
2000	6,050	57.34%	4,101	38.86%	401	3.80%
2004	6,367	55.83%	4,938	43.30%	99	0.87%
2008	5,891	49.63%	5,735	48.31%	245	2.06%
2012	5,651	55.81%	4,219	41.67%	256	2.53%
2016	6,030	58.97%	3,500	34.23%	696	6.81%
2020	6,413	62.05%	3,710	35.89%	213	2.06%
2024	6,771	66.13%	3,334	32.56%	134	1.31%

=== Local ===
Adair County, Missouri

Elected countywide officials
Assessor	Kent Bryant	Republican
Circuit Clerk	Martha Cole	Republican
County Clerk	Sandra J. Collop	Democratic
Collector	Sonja Harden	Democratic
Commissioner (presiding)	Mark Shahan	Republican
Commissioner (district 1)	Bill King	Republican
Commissioner (district 2)	Gayla McHenry	Republican
Coroner	Brian Noe	Republican
Prosecuting Attorney	David Goring	Republican
Public Administrator	Rhonda Noe	Republican
Recorder	Tracy Hunter	Democratic
Sheriff	Jason Lene	Republican
Surveyor	Patrick E. Boren	Republican
Treasurer	Lori J Smith	Republican

Adair County is governed by a three-member commission. The presiding commissioner is elected by the county voters at large. The first district and second district commissioners are voted on by the residents living in the eastern half of the county, and western half of the county respectively. Each commissioner has an equal vote in all county business. Most offices are housed in the Adair County Courthouse, a structure dating from 1896 and listed on the National Register of Historic Places. The Adair County Sheriff's Office is located in the Adair County Detention Center one block north of the courthouse, while the Prosecuting Attorney's office resides in the County Annex building across from the detention center.

The Republican Party controls politics at the local level in Adair County. Republicans hold all but three of the elected positions in the county.

=== State ===
Adair County is split between two legislative districts in the Missouri House of Representatives, both of which are held by Republicans.

- District 3 — Danny Busick (R-Newtown). Consists of the city of Kirksville and the western half of the rest of the county.
- District 4 — Greg Sharpe (R-Ewing). Consists of the eastern half of the county.

All of Adair County is a part of Missouri's 18th District in the Missouri Senate and is currently represented by Cindy O'Laughlin (R-Shelbina).

== See also ==
- National Register of Historic Places listings in Adair County, Missouri
- List of counties in Missouri
