= Black Creek (North Fork Salt River tributary) =

Stream in Missouri, U.S.

Black Creek is a stream in Knox and Shelby counties of the U.S. state of Missouri. It is a tributary of the North Fork of the Salt River.

The headwaters arise in southern Knox County just south of the community of Locust Hill at 40°01′28″N 92°16′15″W and it flows to the southeast passing under Missouri Route 156 2.5 miles west of the community of Novelty. It continues into northwest Shelby County and crosses under Missouri Route 151 at Leonard. It continues passing the community of Kirby and Shelbyville where it turns to the east and under Missouri Route 15. It meanders on to the southeast past Kendall and enters the North Fork one mile north of US Route 36 west of Hunnewell in the southeast corner of Shelby County. The confluence is at 39°41′04″N 91°54′52″W.

Black Creek was named for the dark water it contained.

== See also ==
- List of rivers of Missouri
