= Otter Creek (North Fork Salt River tributary) =

Stream in the U.S. state of Missouri

Otter Creek is a stream in Macon, Monroe and Shelby counties in the U.S. state of Missouri. It is a tributary of the North Fork of the Salt River.

The stream headwaters arise in eastern Macon and western Shelby counties between the communities of Anabel and Clarence and just south of U.S. Route 36 at 39°44′40″N 92°18′55″W. The stream flows southeast passing under Missouri Route 151 and between the communities of Enterprise and Maud and enters Monroe County. The stream continues to the southeast past the town of Granville and on under Missouri Route 15 three miles north of Paris. The stream flows eastward for three miles and passes under U.S. Route 24 within the waters of Mark Twain Lake to its former confluence with the North Fork at 39°30′50″N 91°51′26″W.

Otter Creek was so named on account of otters in the stream.

== See also ==
- List of rivers of Missouri
