= Owl Creek (North River tributary) =

Stream in the U.S. state of Missouri

Owl Creek is a stream in southeastern Knox County in the U.S. state of Missouri. It is a tributary of the North River.

The stream headwaters arise at 40°00′42″N 92°09′08″W at an elevation of approximately 810 feet along the south side of Missouri Route 15 approximately 2.5 miles east of Novelty. The stream flows southeast for about 4.5 miles to its confluence with the North River at 39°58′05″N 92°05′55″W at an elevation of 738 feet. The confluence is 3/4 mile southwest of the community of Plevna.

Owl Creek was named for the presence of owls, as evidenced by the hoots heard by pioneer citizens.

== See also ==
- List of rivers of Missouri
