= North River (Missouri) =

River in Missouri, U.S.

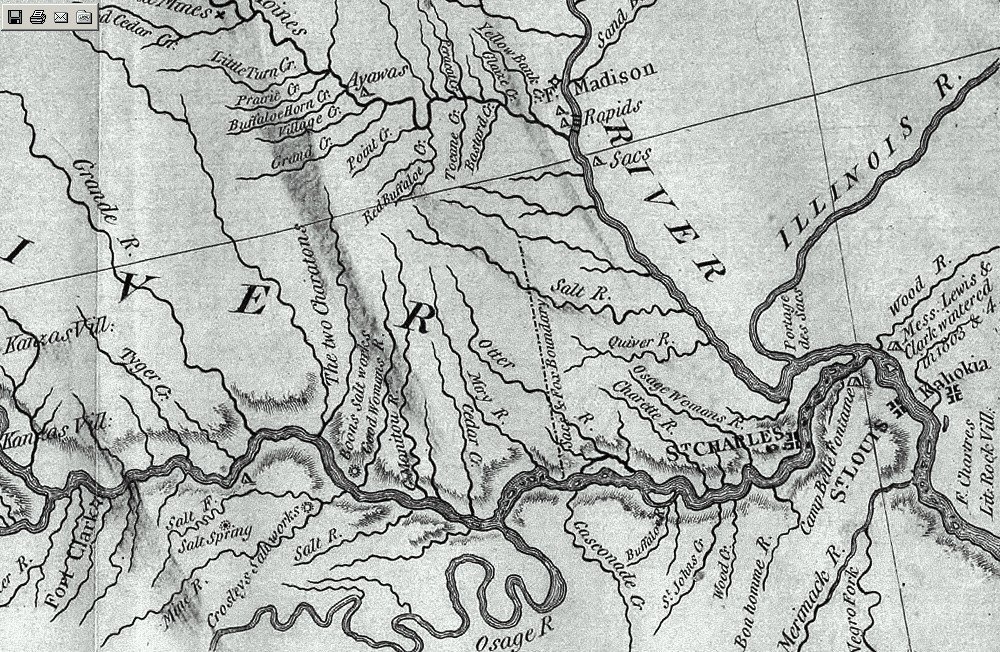
Portion of original Lewis and Clark 1814 map showing the major rivers in northern Missouri draining into the Mississippi along with the Treaty of St. Louis boundary line. There are six major rivers draining into the Mississippi between the Missouri River and the Des Moines. Those rivers are the Cuivre River, Salt River, the North River, the Fabius River, the Wyaconda River, and the Fox River

The North River is an 82-mile-long (132 km) river in northeastern Missouri, the United States. It rises in Knox County at 40°03′30″N 92°15′26″W (northwest of Novelty) and flows southeast and east through Shelby and Marion counties, emptying into the Mississippi River at 39°51′21″N 91°26′41″W between West Quincy and Hannibal.

The North River drainage area is 373 square miles (970 km^{2}), with a median flow of 38 cu ft/s (1.1 m^{3}/s) and a mean flow of 231 cu ft/s (6.5 m^{3}/s) based on 72 years of record at the USGS Palmyra gaging station. Record flow was on April 21, 1973, at 57,500 cu ft/s (1,630 m^{3}/s). During droughts flow sometimes drops to 1 cu ft/s (28 L/s) or less.

== Tributaries ==
Named tributaries of North River include Lazy Branch, Sidnor Creek (Palmyra Big Spring Branch), Lick Creek, Big Branch, Little North River, Hawkins Branch, Merrills Branch, Tiger Fork, Weldons Branch, Looney Creek, Clear Creek, Mesner Branch, Garnett Branch, and Owl Creek.

== History of name ==
The river is believed to be a candidate for the "River Jeffreon" that was referenced in the 1804 Treaty of St. Louis presided over by William Henry Harrison with the Sauk and Meskwaki. Zebulon Pike identified this river as the Jeffreon in his August 19 journal entry with the spelling "Jauflione", although no distinction other than "The Jauflione is about 30 yards wide at its mouth, and bears from the Mississippi about S.W." serves to distinguish it from the nearby Fabius Rivers or South River. The island across the Mississippi River from the outlet of these tributary rivers is labeled "Jeffreon" on Pike's map. The River Jeffreon marked the northern border of Sauk and Meskwaki land ceded in Missouri (extending north from the mouth of the Gasconade River on the Missouri River and then down the river to the Mississippi. In the same treaty the tribes ceded much of northern Illinois and southern Wisconsin on the east side of the Mississippi. Several legal cases stemming from the 1804 treaty have identified the North River as the River Jeffreon.

It derived its current name from its position relative to Palmyra, Missouri. The North River flows north of that town and the South River flows south of it, with the outlets into the Mississippi being shared at times in the past and still within 1,500 feet (460 m) of each other. On some maps from the early 19th century, these rivers are labeled as "North Two Rivers" and "South Two Rivers".
