= Clear Creek (North River tributary) =

Stream in the US state of Missouri

Coordinates: 39°50′07″N 91°56′34″W

Clear Creek is a stream in Shelby County in the U.S. state of Missouri. It is a tributary of the North River.

The stream headwaters arise at at an elevation of approximately 750 feet and 1000 feet west of Missouri Route T. The Stream flows to the north-northwest passing under Missouri Route 164 about one mile from its source and 3.5 miles west of the community of Emden. The stream continues on course for another two miles to its confluence with the North River at at an elevation of 650 feet.

Clear Creek was so named due to the clearness of its cold spring-sourced water.

== See also ==
- List of rivers of Missouri
