= Tiger Fork =

Stream in Shelby County, Missouri, U.S.

Coordinates: 39.848097°N 91.861000°W

Tiger Fork is a stream in Shelby County in the U.S. state of Missouri. It is a tributary of the North River.

Tiger Fork was named for panthers in the area which pioneer citizens mistook for tigers.

The tributaries are Thomas Branch, Spring Branch, Board Branch.

== See also ==
- List of rivers of Missouri
