= Edwin B. Parker =

American lawyer and public official (1868–1929)

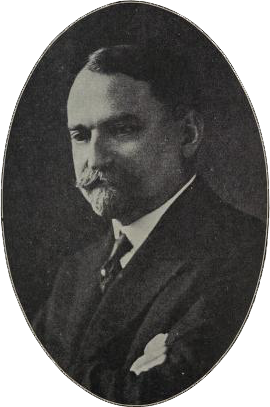
- Parker in a 1923 publication
- Born: Edwin Brewington Parker; September 7, 1868 near Oakdale, Shelby County, Missouri, U.S.
- Died: October 30, 1929 (aged 61); Washington, D.C., U.S.
- Resting place: Glenwood Cemetery; Houston, Texas, U.S.
- Education: Central College
- Alma mater: University of Texas School of Law (LLB)
- Occupations: Lawyer; public official
- Spouse: Katherine Putnam Blunt (m. 1894)
- Awards: Distinguished Service Medal; French Legion of Honour; Order of the Crown of Italy; Order of the Crown of Belgium; Order of Polonia Restituta

Signature
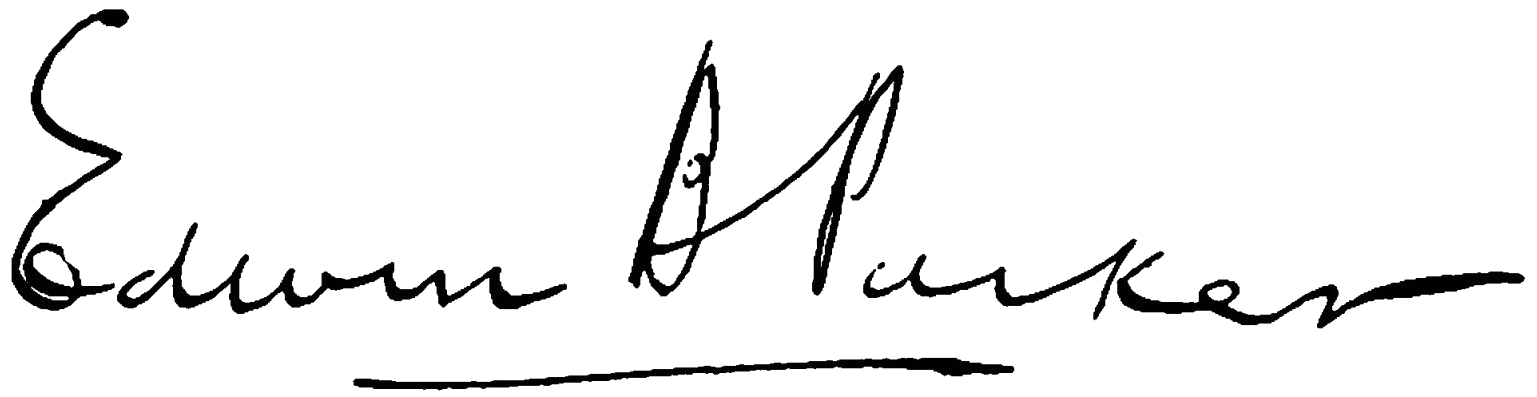

Edwin B. Parker (September 7, 1868 – October 30, 1929) was an American lawyer and public official. He worked as a lawyer in Houston and served as head of the priorities division of the War Industries Board. He also served on the American–German Claims Commission and the Tripartite Claims Commission with Austria and Hungary.

== Early life ==
Parker was born on September 7, 1868, near Oakdale, Shelby County, Missouri, to Enrette and Judge George John Parker. His mother was a teacher in Missouri. He attended a schoolhouse in Missouri and at the age of 15, took over the family's 300 acres (120 ha) farm. He attended Central College in Fayette, Missouri. He graduated from the University of Texas School of Law with a Bachelor of Laws in 1889. While at the University of Texas, he worked for the Texas state government.

== Career ==
After graduating, Parker worked for the traffic department of the Missouri–Kansas–Texas Railroad in Sedalia, Missouri. After a year, he was promoted to assistant general passenger agent and then became the general passenger agent six months later. He worked there until 1893 and moved back to Houston. He became a lawyer with James A. Baker, Baker Botts and Robert S. Lovett in the firm Baker, Botts, Baker & Lovett in Houston. In 1904, the firm became Baker, Botts, Parker & Garwood of Houston after Lovett moved to New York.

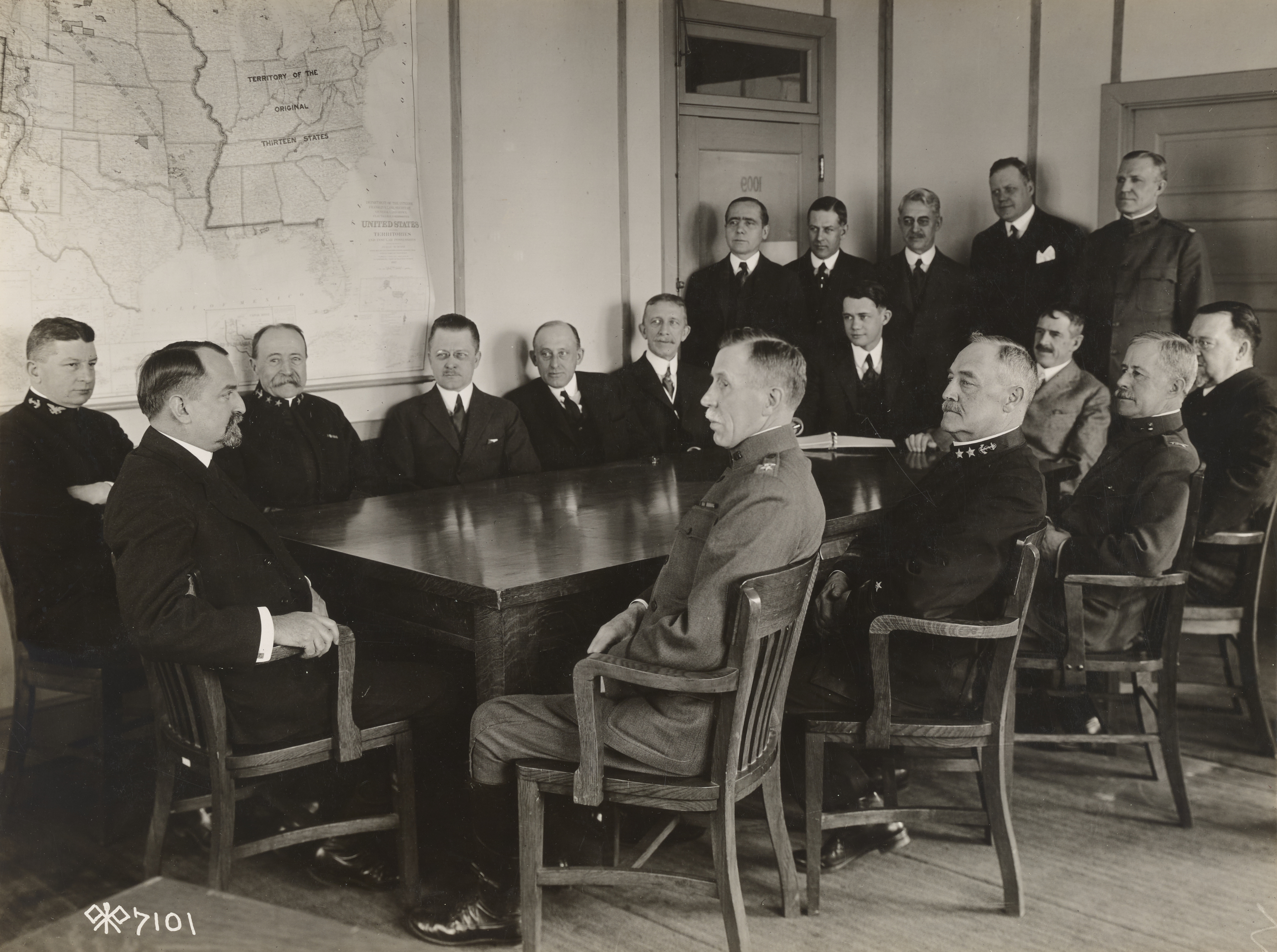
Parker (seated, far left) with the priorities division of the War Industries Board in March 1918

Parker joined the priorities division of the War Industries Board on August 23, 1917. When Robert S. Lovett left the board on March 4, 1918, he replaced him as priorities commissioner and the head of the priorities division. After the armistice, he served as a member of the United States Liquidation Commission. He was awarded the Distinguished Service Medal and the French Legion of Honour. He also received the Order of the Crown of Italy and the Order of the Crown of Belgium. He was awarded the Order of Polonia Restituta with grade of commander by Poland.

From 1920 to 1922, Parker was general counsel and a member of the board of directors of the Texas Company. On September 26, 1922, he was appointed by President Warren G. Harding as American commissioner on the American–German Claims Commission. In January 1923, he moved to Washington, D.C. In 1925, he stopped practicing law. In 1926, he served as commissioner of the Tripartite Claims Commission between the United States, Austria and Hungary. In 1928, he was the sole arbiter between the United States and Germany. In September 1929, he stopped working due to illness.

Parker was a trustee of the Carnegie Endowment for International Peace. He was chairman of the executive committee of the George Washington University and chairman of the board of the United States Chamber of Commerce.

== Personal life ==
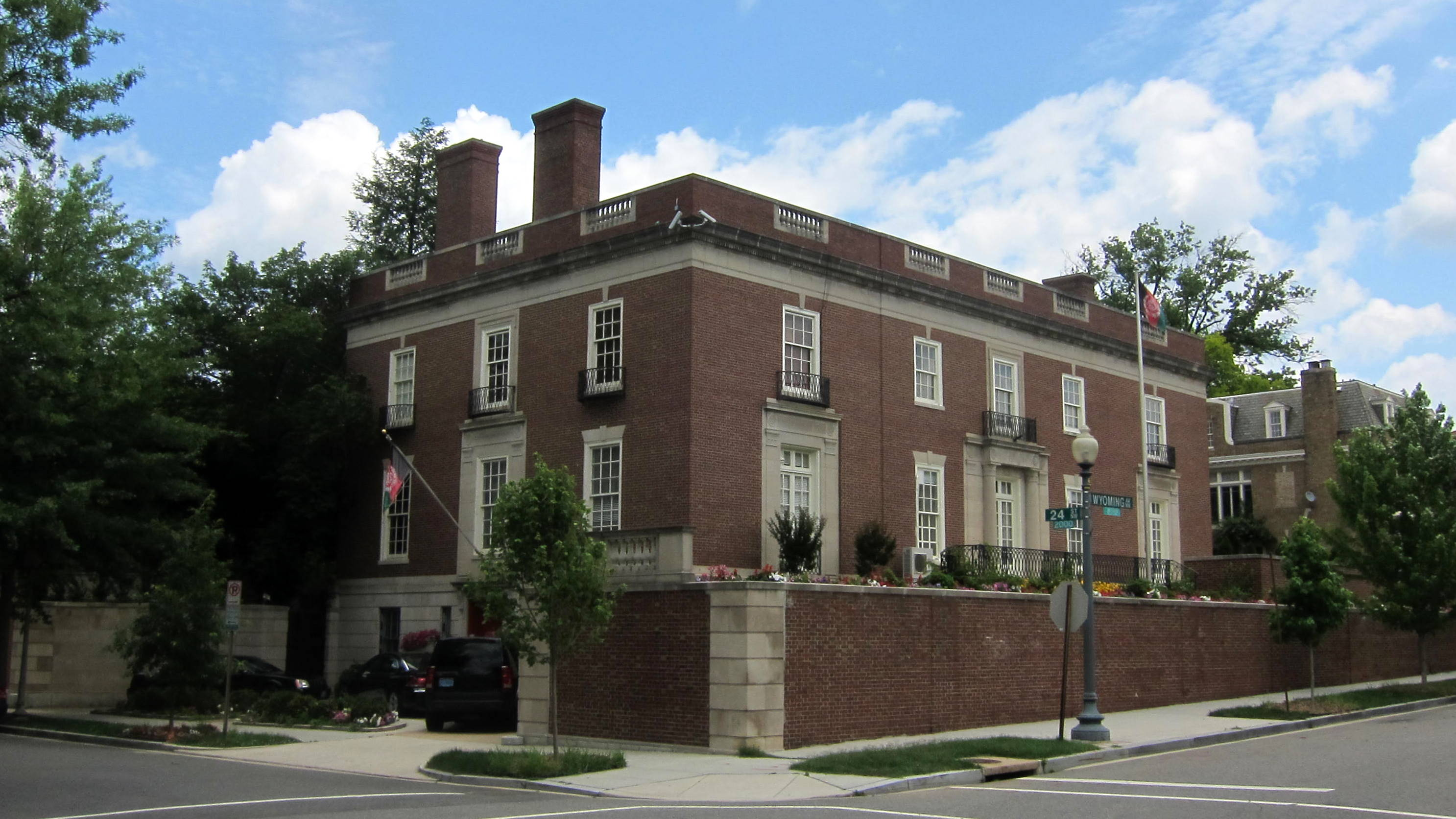
Parker's home at 2001 24th Street NW (now the Embassy of Afghanistan)

In December 1894, Parker married Katherine Putnam Blunt, daughter of James G. Blunt, of Leavenworth, Kansas. He was a member of the Chevy Chase Club, the Metropolitan Club of Washington, D.C. and the Metropolitan Club of New York. He sold his "The Oaks" estate in Houston to his colleague and friend James A. Baker. His home at 2001 24th Street NW in Washington, D.C., would later serve as the Embassy of Afghanistan.

Parker died on October 30, 1929, at his home in Washington, D.C. Following his death, German Ambassador Friedrich Wilhelm von Prittwitz und Gaffron called Parker "a great and successful protagonist in the cause of international arbitration and understanding". Attendees at his funeral in Washington, D.C., included notable D.C. lawyers, statesmen and businessman, including James Clark McReynolds, Harlan F. Stone, William D. Mitchell, Robert W. Bonynge, Admiral Robert Coontz, William Butterworth, Cloyd H. Marvin and Robert S. Lovett. German official Otto Kiep was also in attendance. He had a separate funeral in Houston at his former "The Oaks" home and was buried at Glenwood Cemetery in Houston.
