= Merrills Branch =

Stream in the American state of Missouri

Coordinates: 39°49′14″N 91°48′34″W

Merrills Branch is a stream in Marion and Shelby Counties in the U.S. state of Missouri. It is a tributary of the North River.

Merrills Branch has the name of an early settler.

== See also ==
- List of rivers of Missouri
