= Lentner, Missouri =

Unincorporated community in Missouri, U.S.

Coordinates: 39°43′07″N 92°08′53″W

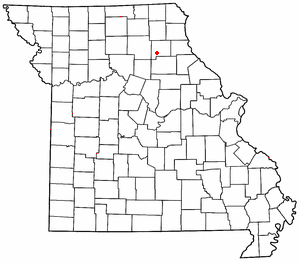

Lentner is an unincorporated community in southern Shelby County, Missouri, United States. It is located on U.S. Route 36 about six miles west of Shelbina.

A post office called Lentner has been in operation since 1873. However, it was discontinued on March 7, 2009. The community takes its name from Lentner Lathrop, an early settler.
