= Mesner Branch =

Stream in Shelby County, Missouri, U.S.

Coordinates: 39.853929°N 92.003228°W

Mesner Branch is a stream in Shelby County in the U.S. state of Missouri. It is a tributary of the North River.

A variant spelling was "Messner Branch". The stream has the name of F. K. Messner, an early settler.

== See also ==
- List of rivers of Missouri
