= Kellerville =

Kellerville may refer to the following geographical locations:

- Kellerville, Illinois
- Kellerville, Indiana
- Kellerville, Missouri
