= Looney Creek =

Stream in Shelby County, Missouri, U.S.

Coordinates: 39.847263°N 91.932392°W

Looney Creek (sometimes called Looneys Creek) is a stream in Shelby County in the U.S. state of Missouri. It is a tributary of the North River.

Looney Creek has the name of Peter Looney, an early settler.

== See also ==
- List of rivers of Missouri
