= Cherry Box, Missouri =

Unincorporated community in Missouri, US

Coordinates: 39°55′29″N 92°14′07″W

Cherry Box is an unincorporated community in northwestern Shelby County, Missouri, United States. The community is on Missouri Route B, 3.5 miles northwest of Leonard. The North Fork of the Salt River flows past two miles to the west of the community.

== History ==
Cherry Box was founded in the 1850s by a colony of German Mennonites. The origin of the name "Cherry Box" is uncertain; explanations range from early mailboxes being nailed to cherry trees to accounts that the men selecting the name simply liked the word "cherry". A post office called Cherry Box was established in 1858, and remained in operation until 1943.
