= Thomas Branch (Tiger Fork tributary) =

Stream in Shelby County, Missouri, U.S.

Coordinates: 39.921430°N 91.974061°W

Thomas Branch is a stream in Shelby County in the U.S. state of Missouri. It is a tributary of Tiger Fork.

Thomas Branch has the name of the original owner of the site.

== See also ==
- List of rivers of Missouri
