= Missouri Route 151 =

State highway in Missouri, U.S.

Route 151
- MO 151 highlighted in red

Route information
- Maintained by MoDOT
- Length: 68.569 mi (110.351 km)

Major junctions
- South end: Route 22 / Route 124 in Centralia
- US 24 in Madison; US 36 / Route 110 (CKC) in Clarence
- North end: Route 15 / Route 156 south of Edina

Location
- Country: United States
- State: Missouri

Highway system
- Missouri State Highway System; Interstate; US; State; Supplemental
← Route 150	→ Route 152

Route 151 is a highway in the U.S. state of Missouri. Its northern terminus is at Route 15/Route 156 about 13 miles (21 km) south of Edina; its southern terminus is at Route 22/Route 124 in Centralia.

Route 151 was designated in 1949, replacing all or part of several state-lettered routes. In 1955, Route 151 was extended onto an old alignment of Route 22 after Route 22 was realigned west of Centralia. Because of the extension, Route 151 intersects Route 22 twice and the two routes are briefly multiplexed. As of 1957, Route 151 was completely hard-surfaced.

== Major intersections ==
County	Location	mi	km	Destinations	Notes
Boone	Centralia	0.000	0.000	Route 22 / Route 124 south – Hallsville, Mexico	
Boone–Audrain county line	Bourbon–Saling township line	5.802	9.337	Route 22 east – Centralia	Southern end of Route 22 overlap
Audrain	Saling Township	6.113	9.838	Route 22 west to US 63	Northern end of Route 22 overlap
Monroe	Madison	22.776	36.654	US 24 west – Moberly	Southern end of US 24 overlap
Monroe	Madison	22.903	36.859	US 24 east – Paris	Northern end of US 24 overlap
Shelby	Clarence	45.032	72.472	US 36 Bus. to US 36 – Macon, Shelbina	Access to eastbound US 36 / Route 110
Shelby	Clarence	45.274	72.861	US 36 west / Route 110 (CKC) west – Macon	No access to or from eastbound US 36 / Route 110
Knox	Salt River–Bourbon township line	68.185	109.733	Route 156 west – Novelty	Southern end of Route 156 overlap
Knox	Bourbon Township	68.569	110.351	Route 15 / Route 156 east – Plevna, Edina	Northern end of Route 156 overlap
1.000 mi = 1.609 km; 1.000 km = 0.621 mi: Concurrency terminus; Incomplete access
