= Benjamin House =

Benjamin House may refer to:

== People ==
- Ben House, footballer

== Buildings ==
- Reuben M. Benjamin House, Bloomington, IL, listed on the NRHP in Illinois
- Benjamin House (Shelbina, Missouri), listed on the NRHP in Missouri
- Belcher-Ogden Mansion-Price, Benjamin-Price-Brittan Houses District, Elizabeth, NJ, listed on the NRHP in New Jersey
- James Benjamin Homestead, Flanders, NY, listed on the NRHP in New York
