= Leonard, Missouri =

- Village
- Location of Leonard, Missouri
- Coordinates: 39°53′43″N 92°10′51″W
- Country: United States
- State: Missouri
- County: Shelby

Area
  - Total: 0.32 sq mi (0.83 km^{2})
  - Land: 0.32 sq mi (0.83 km^{2})
  - Water: 0 sq mi (0.00 km^{2})
- Elevation: 781 ft (238 m)

Population (2020)
  - Total: 57
  - Density: 177.1/sq mi (68.36/km^{2})
- Time zone: UTC-6 (Central (CST))
  - Summer (DST): UTC-5 (CDT)
- ZIP code: 63451
- Area code: 660
- FIPS code: 29-41546
- GNIS feature ID: 0735688

Leonard is a village in northwestern Shelby County, Missouri, United States. The population was 57 at the 2020 census.

== History ==
A post office called Leonard has been in operation since 1875. The community was named after Leonora Miller, the daughter of a local mill owner (a recording error accounts for the error in spelling, which was never corrected).

== Geography ==
Leonard is located on Missouri Route 151 approximately ten miles north-northeast of Clarence. Black Creek flows past the community.

According to the United States Census Bureau, the village has a total area of 0.32 square miles (0.83 km^{2}), all land.

== Demographics ==
Historical population
Census	Pop.	Note	%±
1920	231		—
1930	198		−14.3%
1940	143		−27.8%
1950	165		15.4%
1960	142		−13.9%
1970	107		−24.6%
1980	109		1.9%
1990	90		−17.4%
2000	66		−26.7%
2010	61		−7.6%
2020	57		−6.6%
U.S. Decennial Census

=== 2010 census ===
As of the census of 2010, there were 61 people, 28 households, and 18 families living in the village. The population density was 190.6 inhabitants per square mile (73.6/km^{2}). There were 36 housing units at an average density of 112.5 per square mile (43.4/km^{2}). The racial makeup of the village was 100.0% White.

There were 28 households, of which 32.1% had children under the age of 18 living with them, 53.6% were married couples living together, 10.7% had a female householder with no husband present, and 35.7% were non-families. 35.7% of all households were made up of individuals, and 28.6% had someone living alone who was 65 years of age or older. The average household size was 2.18 and the average family size was 2.78.

The median age in the village was 41.8 years. 24.6% of residents were under the age of 18; 3.1% were between the ages of 18 and 24; 24.6% were from 25 to 44; 19.6% were from 45 to 64; and 27.9% were 65 years of age or older. The gender makeup of the village was 45.9% male and 54.1% female.

=== 2000 census ===
As of the census of 2000, there were 66 people, 29 households, and 18 families living in the village. The population density was 205.8 people per square mile (79.5 people/km^{2}). There were 40 housing units at an average density of 124.7 per square mile (48.1/km^{2}). The racial makeup of the village was 96.97% White, 1.52% from other races, and 1.52% from two or more races. Hispanic or Latino of any race were 1.52% of the population.

There were 29 households, out of which 31.0% had children under the age of 18 living with them, 58.6% were married couples living together, 3.4% had a female householder with no husband present, and 37.9% were non-families. 37.9% of all households were made up of individuals, and 27.6% had someone living alone who was 65 years of age or older. The average household size was 2.28 and the average family size was 3.06.

In the village, the population was spread out, with 22.7% under the age of 18, 4.5% from 18 to 24, 27.3% from 25 to 44, 24.2% from 45 to 64, and 21.2% who were 65 years of age or older. The median age was 42 years. For every 100 females, there were 78.4 males. For every 100 females age 18 and over, there were 59.4 males.

The median income for a household in the village was $11,250, and the median income for a family was $4,821. Males had a median income of $71,250 versus $13,750 for females. The per capita income for the village was $13,067. There were 53.8% of families and 35.3% of the population living below the poverty line, including no under eighteens and 50.0% of those over 64.
