= Burksville =

Burksville may refer to:

- Burksville, Illinois
- Burksville, Missouri

Burkesville

- Burkesville, Kentucky
