= Missouri Route 124 =

State highway in Missouri, U.S.

Route 124
- MO 124 highlighted in red

Route information
- Maintained by MoDOT
- Length: 35.072 mi (56.443 km)

Major junctions
- South end: Route 240 east of Fayette
- US 63 south of Sturgeon
- North end: Route 22 / Route 151 in Centralia

Location
- Country: United States
- State: Missouri

Highway system
- Missouri State Highway System; Interstate; US; State; Supplemental
← Route 123	→ Route 125

Route 124 is a highway in central Missouri. Its eastern terminus is at Route 22/151 in Centralia; its western terminus is at Route 240 east of Fayette.

== Route description ==
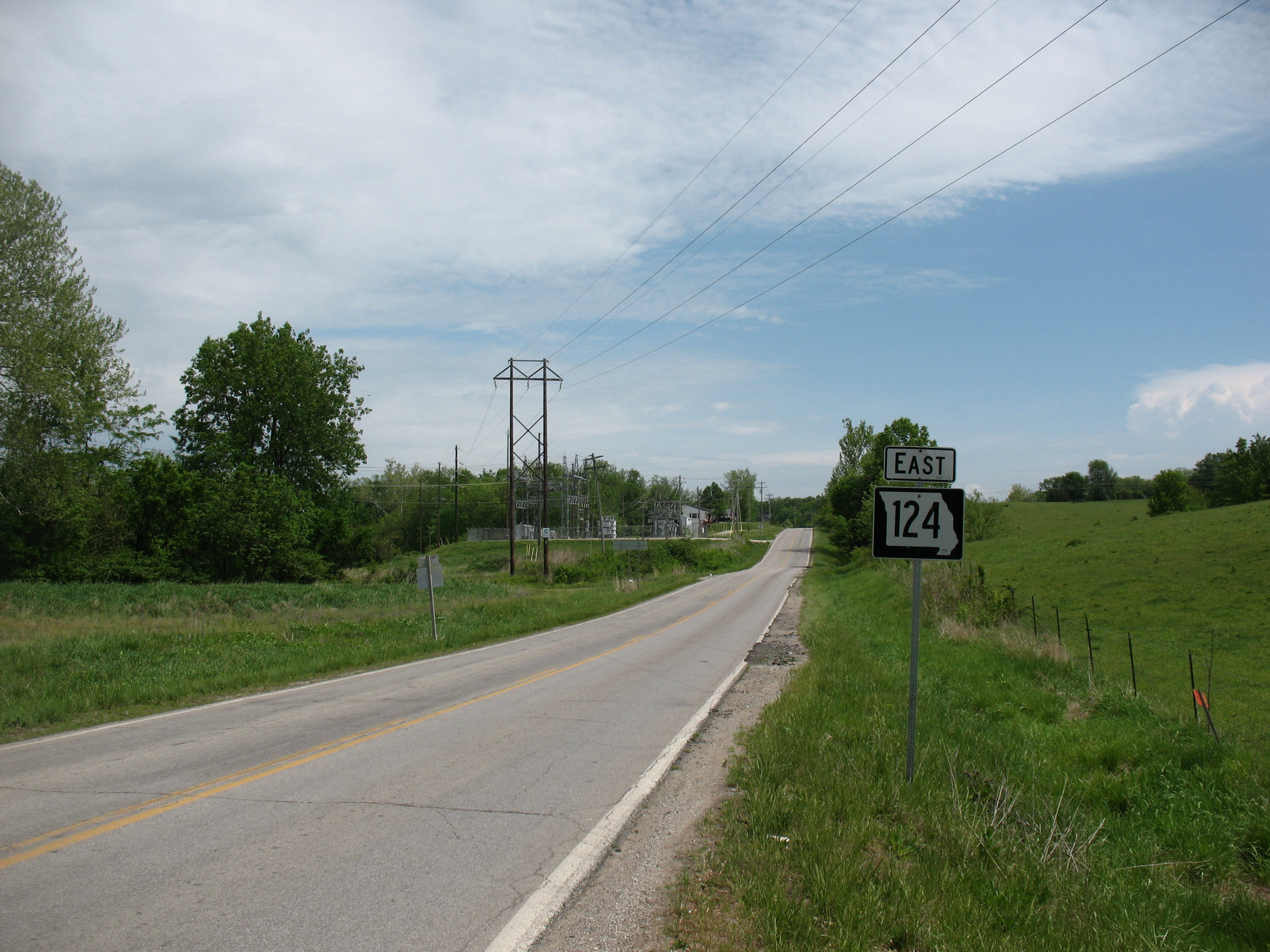
MO 124 eastbound at its western terminus at MO 240

Route 124 begins outside the small town of Fayette. About a half mile east of the town, and just passed Boone Femme Creek, Route 124 splits off of Route 240. After winding through a half mile of farmland, it intersects with the combined Routes H and HH. After two miles of farmland, Route 124 joins with Route A for one mile, before Route A splits off to the north.

== Major intersections ==
County	Location	mi	km	Destinations	Notes
Howard	Fayette	0.000	0.000	Route 240 – Rocheport, Fayette	
Boone	Rocky Fork Township	19.941	32.092	US 63 north – Moberly	Western end of US 63 overlap
Boone	Rocky Fork Township	20.780	33.442	US 63 south – Columbia	Eastern end of US 63 overlap
Boone	Centralia	35.072	56.443	Route 22 / Route 151 north – Mexico	Roadway continues as Route 151
1.000 mi = 1.609 km; 1.000 km = 0.621 mi: Concurrency terminus
