= Lakeland, Missouri =

Unincorporated community in Missouri, U.S.

Coordinates: 39.8947596°N 92.2737947°W

Lakeland is an unincorporated community in Shelby County, in the U.S. state of Missouri.

== History ==
A post office called Lakeland was established in 1857, and remained in operation until 1860. It is unknown why the name "Lakeland" was applied to this community, as there were no known lakes near the original town site.
