= Board Branch =

Stream in Shelby County, Missouri, U.S.

Coordinates: 39.9086522°N 91.9390594°W

Board Branch is a stream in Shelby County in the U.S. state of Missouri. It is a tributary of Tiger Fork.

Board Branch was so named for the board trees near its course which supplied sawmills.

== See also ==
- List of rivers of Missouri
