= Missouri Route 22 =

State highway in Missouri, U.S.

Route 22

Route information
- Maintained by MoDOT
- Length: 28.797 mi (46.344 km)
- Existed: 1922–present

Major junctions
- West end: US 63 / Route F south of Clark
- East end: US 54 / US 54 Bus. / Route 15 in Mexico

Location
- Country: United States
- State: Missouri

Highway system
- Missouri State Highway System; Interstate; US; State; Supplemental
← Route 21	→ Route 23

Route 22 is a highway in central Missouri. Its eastern terminus is at U.S. Route 54 in Mexico; its western terminus is at U.S. Route 63 south of Clark on the Randolph/Boone county line. Route 22 was one of the original 1922 state highways and originally had an eastern terminus at Route 9 (now U.S. Route 61) in Louisiana. This section was replaced by U.S. Route 54 in 1926.

== Route description ==
Route 22 begins at a junction of US Route 63 east of Sturgeon. Route 22 passes north of Sturgeon. Strugeon can be accessed by taking Route V. Route 22 picks up a concurrent with Route 151 for a little bit before passing through Centralia where it met the terminus of Route 151 and Route 124. Next, it passes through Thompson. Then, it passes through Mexico. Through Mexico, it will pick a concurrency with US Route 54 Business Route and Route 15. After leaving Mexico, Route 22 along with US Route 54 Business Route and Route 15 ends at a junction of US Route 54.

== Major intersections ==
County	Location	mi	km	Destinations	Notes
Boone		0.000– 0.173	0.000– 0.278	US 63 / Route F – Moberly, Columbia	Western terminus; Partial cloverleaf interchange
Audrain–Boone county line		1.799	2.895	Route Y	Southern terminus of Route Y
Audrain–Boone county line		2.721	4.379	Route V – Sturgeon	Northern terminus of Route V
Audrain		5.289	8.512	Route 151 north – Madison	Western end of Route 151 concurrency
Audrain–Boone county line		5.600	9.012	Route 151 south	Eastern end of Route 151 concurrency
Boone	Centralia	10.254	16.502	Route 124 south / Route 151 north (Switzler Street) – Hallsville	Northern terminus of Route 124; Southern terminus of Route 151
Boone	Centralia	10.593	17.048	Route 124 Bus. (Allen Street)	Northern terminus of Route 124 Business
Audrain		17.743	28.555	Route E – Paris	Southern terminus of Route E
Audrain		21.664	34.865	Route NN	Southern terminus of Route NN
Audrain	Mexico	24.602	39.593	Route 15 north (Western Street) / W. Monroe Street	Western end of Route 15 concurrency
Audrain	Mexico			Route FF (W. Liberty Street)	
Audrain	Mexico	25.474	40.996	US 54 Bus. (Boulevard Street) / Clark Street	Western end of US 54 Business concurrency
Audrain		28.627	46.071	Route D	Eastern terminus of Route D
Audrain		28.665– 28.797	46.132– 46.344	US 54 / US 54 Bus. / Route 15 – Bowling Green, Jefferson City	Eastern end of US 54 Business and Route 15 concurrency
1.000 mi = 1.609 km; 1.000 km = 0.621 mi: Concurrency terminus
