= Lakenan, Missouri =

Unincorporated community in Missouri, U.S.

Coordinates: 39°40′20″N 91°57′04″W

Lakenan is an unincorporated community in Shelby County, in the U.S. state of Missouri.

== History ==
Lakenan was laid out in 1858 when the railroad was extended to the area. The community has the name of Robert F. Lakenan, a railroad promoter. A post office called Lakenan was in operation from 1859 until 1968.
