= Elgin, Missouri =

Unincorporated community in Missouri, U.S.

Coordinates: 39°56′08″N 91°59′49″W

Elgin is an unincorporated community in Shelby County, in the U.S. state of Missouri.

== History ==
A post office called Elgin was established in 1887, and remained in operation until 1907. The community has the name of George Elgin, a pioneer citizen.
