= Shelby County R-IV School District =

School district in Missouri, U.S.

Address
- 4154 Highway 36 Shelbina, Missouri, 63468; United States

District information
- Type: Public
- Grades: PreK–12
- NCES District ID: 2928110

Students and staff
- Students: 706
- Teachers: 50.82
- Staff: 44.45
- Student–teacher ratio: 13.89

Other information
- Website: www.cardinals.k12.mo.us

Shelby County R-IV School District is a school district headquartered in Shelbina, Missouri. It serves Shelbina and Clarence.

Its schools:

- South shelby Elementary School (PK-05)
- South Shelby Middle School (06–08)
- South Shelby High School (09–12)

In April 2018, Shelby County R-IV voters passed a tax increase issue to construct a new consolidated elementary school building. The new school will replace the current buildings located in Shelbina, and Clarence, and move all elementary students to a new building at the Middle/High School campus, located west of Shelbina. The new elementary is currently under construction, and is scheduled to be operational for the 2020–2021 school year.
