= Thompson, Missouri =

Unincorporated community in Missouri, United States

Coordinates: 39°11′19″N 91°58′59″W

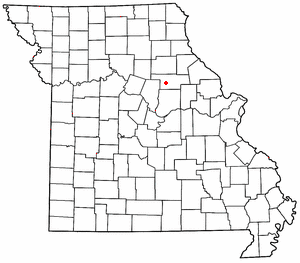

Thompson is an unincorporated community in Audrain County, Missouri, United States. It is located six miles west of Mexico on Route 22. The ZIP Code for Thompson is 65285.

A post office called Thompson's Station was established in 1860, and the name was changed to Thompson in 1883. William Tompson, an early postmaster, gave the community his name.
