= Edward McKendree Bounds =

American author (1835–1913)

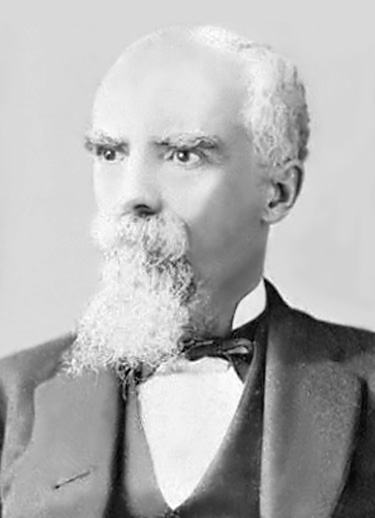
- Edward McKendree Bounds (circa 1864)
- Born: August 15, 1835; Shelby County, Missouri, U.S.
- Died: August 24, 1913 (aged 78); Washington, Georgia, U.S.
- Resting place: Resthaven Cemetery
- Occupations: Clergy, attorney, author
- Spouse(s): Emma Elizabeth Barnett (m. 1876–1886); Harriet Elizabeth Barnett (m. 1887–1913)
- Children: nine
- Writing career
- Pen name: E. M. Bounds
- Language: English
- Genre: Spiritual
- Subject: Prayer

Edward McKendree Bounds (August 15, 1835 – August 24, 1913) prominently known as E.M. Bounds, was an American author, attorney, and member of the Methodist Episcopal Church South clergy. He is known for writing 11 books, eight of which focused on the subject of prayer. Only two of Bounds's books were published before he died. After his death, Rev. Claudius (Claude) Lysias Chilton, Jr., grandson of William Parish Chilton and admirer of Bounds, worked on preserving and preparing Bounds's collection of manuscripts for publication. By 1921, Homer W. Hodge completed additional editorial work.

== Early life ==
Edward McKendree Bounds was born on August 15, 1835, in Shelbyville, Missouri, the son of Thomas Jefferson Bounds and Hester Ann "Hetty" Bounds (née Purnell). In the preface to E.M. Bounds on Prayer, published by Hendrickson Christian Classics Series over 90 years after Bounds's death, it is surmised that young Edward was named after the evangelist, William McKendree, who planted churches in western Missouri and served as the fourth bishop of the Methodist Episcopal Church. He was the fifth child, in a family of three sons and three daughters.

Thomas Jefferson Bounds was one of the original settlers of Shelby County. Prior to organizing the County, Thomas Bounds served as the first Justice of the Peace. In April 1835, he was named County Clerk, followed by an appointment to serve as the County Commissioner in December 1835. In 1836, he began holding circuit court in his home, during the third term each year. In his capacity as County Commissioner, he platted the town into blocks and lots for new settlers. In 1840, he advanced the building of the First Methodist Church. In 1849, Thomas contracted tuberculosis and died.

After his father's death, 14-year-old Bounds joined several other relatives in a trek to Mesquite Canyon in California, following the discovery of gold in the area. After four unsuccessful years, they returned to Missouri. Bounds studied law in Hannibal, Missouri, after which, at age 19, he became the youngest practicing lawyer in the state of Missouri. Although apprenticed as an attorney, Bounds felt called to Christian ministry in his early twenties during the Third Great Awakening. Following a brush arbor revival meeting led by Evangelist Smith Thomas, he closed his law office and moved to Palmyra, Missouri to enroll in the Centenary Seminary. Two years later, in 1859 at the age of 24, he was ordained by his denomination and was named pastor of the nearby Monticello, Missouri Methodist Church.

=== Marriage and children ===
Bounds's first marriage was to Emma (Emmie) Elizabeth Barnett from Washington, Georgia on September 19, 1876. They had two daughters, Celeste and Corneille, and a son, Edward. Emmie died on February 18, 1886.

Twenty months later, Edward married Emmie's cousin, Harriet (Hattie) Elizabeth Barnett in 1887. To them were born three sons (Samuel, Charles, and Osborne) and three daughters (Elizabeth, Mary, and Emmie). His son Edward, by his first wife, died at the age of six, and his son Charles, by his second wife, died eight days after his first birthday.

=== Military service ===
E.M. Bounds did not support slavery. But, because he was a pastor at a congregation in the recently formed Methodist Episcopal Church South, his name was included in a list of 250 names who were to take an oath of allegiance and post a $500 bond. Edward saw no reason for a U.S. Citizen to take such an oath, he was morally opposed to the Union raising funds in this way, and he didn't have the $500. Bounds and the others on the list were arrested in 1861 by Union troops, and Bounds was charged as a Confederate sympathizer. He was held with other non-combatants in a Federal prison in St. Louis for a year and a half. He was then transferred to Memphis and released in a prisoner exchange between the Union and the Confederacy.

He became a chaplain in the Confederate States Army (3rd Missouri Infantry CSA). During the Second Battle of Franklin, Bounds suffered a severe forehead injury from a Union saber, and he was taken prisoner. On June 28, 1865, Bounds was among Confederate prisoners who were released upon the taking of an oath of loyalty to the United States.

=== Pastoral service ===
Upon his release as a prisoner of the Union Army, he felt compelled to return to war-torn Franklin and help rebuild it spiritually, and he became the pastor of the Franklin Methodist Episcopal Church, South. His primary method was to establish weekly prayer sessions that sometimes lasted several hours. Bounds was regionally celebrated for leading spiritual revival in Franklin and eventually began an itinerant preaching ministry throughout the country.

After serving several important churches in St. Louis and other places, south, he became Editor of the St. Louis Christian Advocate for eight years and, later, Associate Editor of The Nashville Christian Advocate for four years. The trial of his faith came to him while in Nashville, and he quietly retired to his home without asking even a pension. His principal work in Washington, Georgia (his home) was rising at 4 am and praying until 7 am. He filled a few engagements as an evangelist during the eighteen years of his lifework. "While on speaking engagements, he would not neglect his early morning time in prayer, and cared nothing for the protests of the other occupants of his room at being awakened so early. No man could have made more melting appeals for lost souls and backslidden ministers than did Bounds. Tears ran down his face as he pleaded for us all in that room."

According to people who were constantly with him, in prayer and preaching, for eight years "Not a foolish word did we ever hear him utter. He was one of the most intense eagles of God that ever penetrated the spiritual ether. He could not brook delay in rising, or being late for dinner. He would go with me to street meetings often in Brooklyn and listen to the preaching and sing with us those beautiful songs of Wesley and Watts. He often reprimanded me for asking the unconverted to sing of Heaven. Said he: 'They have no heart to sing, they do not know God, and God does not hear them. Quit asking sinners to sing the songs of Zion and the Lamb.'"

== Theology ==
In his writings, Bounds adopted soteriological views which follow with some details, the Arminian orthodoxy.

== Writing background ==
Only two of Bounds's books were published before he died. After his death, Rev. Claudius (Claude) Lysias Chilton, Jr., grandson of William Parish Chilton and admirer of Bounds, worked on preserving and preparing Bounds's collection of manuscripts for publication. By 1921, more editorial work had been done by Rev. Homer W. Hodge.

Chilton said of Bounds's books, "These books are unfailing wells for a lifetime of spiritual water-drawing. They are hidden treasures, wrought in the darkness of dawn and the heat of the noon, on the anvil of experience, and beaten into wondrous form by the mighty stroke of the divine. They are living voices whereby he, being dead, yet speaketh!"

== Published works ==
- Preacher and Prayer (1907), republished as Power Through Prayer
- The Resurrection (1907, republished in 1921 as Ineffable Glory: Thoughts on the Resurrection)
- Purpose in Prayer (1920)
- Prayer and Praying Men (1921)
- Heaven: A Place—A City—A Home (1921)
- Satan: His Personality, Power and Overthrow (1922)
- The Possibilities of Prayer (1923)
- The Reality of Prayer (1924)
- The Essentials of Prayer (1925)
- The Necessity of Prayer (1929)
- The Weapon of Prayer (1931)

== Notes and references ==
=== Sources ===
- Bounds, E.M. (2016). Prayer Warrior Bootcamp, Targeted Communications, 318 pages. ISBN 978-0991312634
- Bounds, E.M. (2006). E.M. Bounds on Prayer, Hendrickson Christian Classics Series, 267 pages. ISBN 978-1598560527
- Bounds, E.M. (2000). The Complete Works of E.M. Bounds on Prayer, Prince Press, 568 pages. ISBN 978-1565635838
- Bounds, E.M. (1921b). Heaven, a Place, A City, A Home. Baker Books. ISBN 978-0801006487
- Bounds, E.M., (foreword by Claude Chilton). The Necessity of Prayer, 84 pages. ISBN 978-0585035987
- Jewett, Tom (2004). Failed Ambition: The Civil War Journals & Letters of Cavalryman Homer Harris, 300 pages. ISBN 978-1438240879
- Smith, Grady DeVon (2013). Edward McKendree Bounds on the Relationship Between Providence and Man's Will in Prayer (PDF). The Southern Baptist Theological Seminary.
