= Heartland Christian Academy, Missouri =

Private school in Missouri, United States

Heartland Christian Academy

Location
- Shelby County, Missouri; 39.9437304°N 91.9904957°W

Information
- Religious affiliation: Protestant
- Grades: K-12
- Website: hlandacademy.org

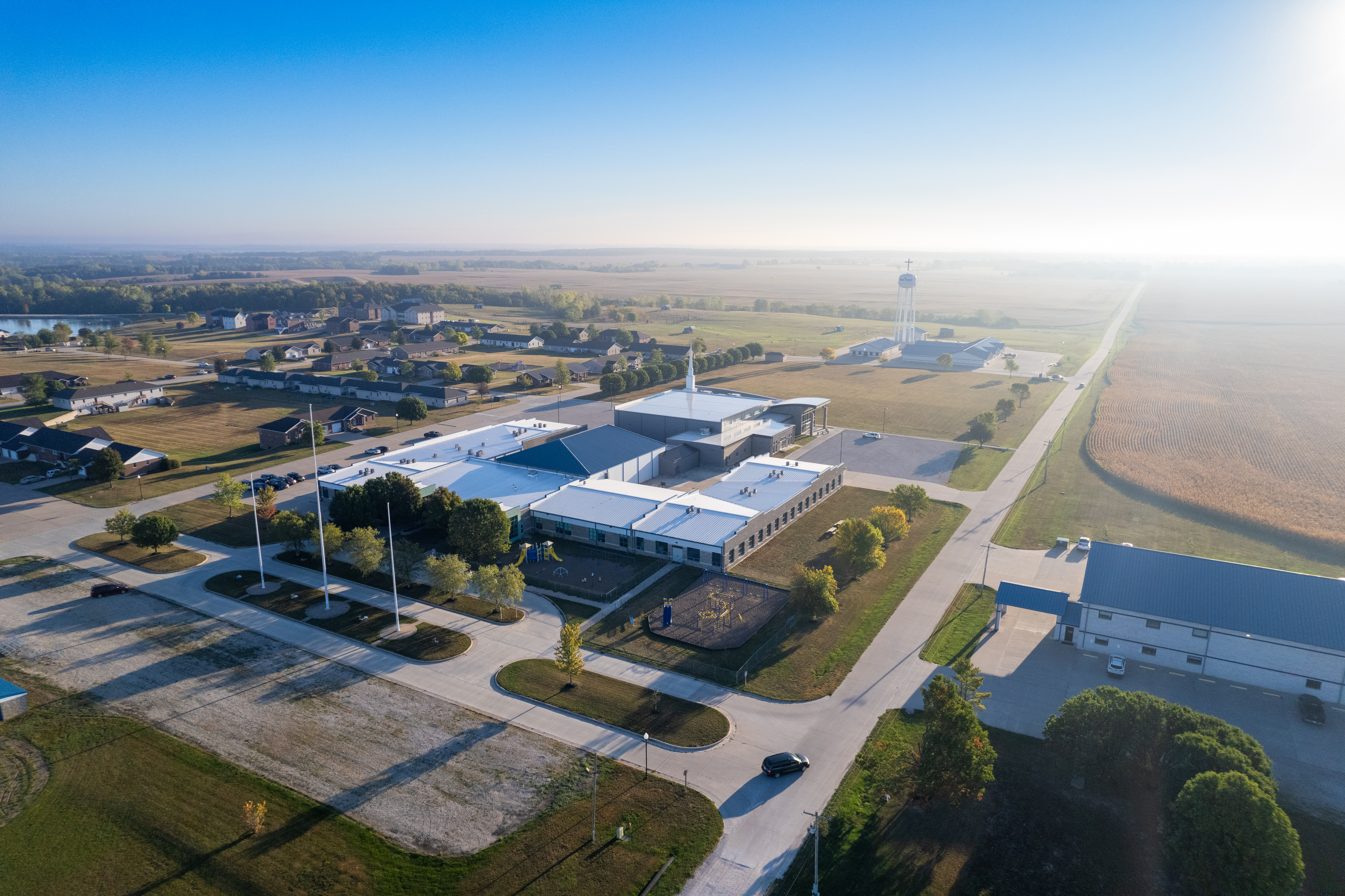
Aerial view of Heartland Christian Academy in the morning

Heartland Christian Academy (HCS) is a private Christian school located within the Heartland Community in Shelby County, Missouri. Founded in 1995, targeting students with behavioral issues as a part of CNS International Ministries, the school treats troubled youth and adults using work therapy and Christian instruction. It has a daycare and serves students from preschool to high school.

== History ==
=== Founding ===
Heartland Christian Academy was founded in 1995 by Charles Sharpe, a millionaire businessman who was the founder of Ozark National Life Insurance Co. Pastor Sharpe said he had a calling from God to found Heartland Christian as a nondenominational Christian school for children with a troubled past who had been through broken homes, foster care, and the juvenile court system. The school is part of a 20,000 acre religious complex built by Sharpe. As of 2001, the complex was reported to include a hotel, a community of brick duplexes, two restaurants, a gas station, a private airfield, 3,200 milk cows and a large cattle operation. The school treats troubled youth and adults by using work therapy and Christian instruction.

The school serves teens, adults, and entire families who come to work and shed bad habits. Work is part of the deal, (in 2013 the complex, including the school employed 500 people) as is a total abstinence from all drugs, including tobacco.

=== Allegations of abuse and police raid ===
In the past, Heartland Christian Academy has been subject to several investigations related to alleged abuse of students, often stemming from the school's use of corporal punishment. On October 30, 2001, state officials raided the school and 115 children were removed. The academy won a civil suit stating that the raid was unwarranted, and the court barred state officials from further removals without solid evidence of abuse. Charges against several staff were either dropped or resulted in acquittals.

Earlier in the summer of 2001, there was an incident in which eleven teenaged students were allegedly forced to stand in cow manure, some from the ankles and others up to chest-high. A raid from the sheriff followed, and five workers were arrested. Sharpe defended the workers, saying the manure punishment was bad public relations, but not illegal, abusive, nor a health risk. The school referred to the practice as "school appreciation day".

11 students were removed by law enforcement, but within a week 8 had been returned by their families. Sharpe stated that the real abuse was how the children lived outside the school, stating that no student at HCS goes to school afraid of guns. He called the school a haven from abuse, drugs, pregnancy, school shootings and hopelessness.

Sharpe stated that "If shoveling manure is abuse, then I was abused and every kid raised on a farm with livestock was abused. No, they are absolutely wrong. This is about discipline," and claimed authorities wanted to shut down Heartland, because of religion, in which he included the use of corporal punishment. Sharpe has further described those who criticize his work: "They are evil, There's not another term for it. They hate us. They literally hate us." Ultimately charges against two of the employees were dropped, while the other three were acquitted.

=== Trials and civil suits ===
In 2002, Sharpe's attorneys convinced a federal judge to ban future raids on the school, but to allow the state to continue to investigate any further reports of individual abuse.

In 2004 a US District Court ruled that state juvenile officers had violated the ministry's constitutional rights in the raid. The judge stated that kids at the school are "loved at all costs" and the ministry should "have the expectation and the right to be free from conspiratorial government predators." He also stated that a state juvenile officers statements were not truthful, and were part of an attempt to close the school due to his own "blind opposition to faith-based operations."

In 2005 the state paid Heartland $800,000 in court costs. In 2010 the school initiated a federal lawsuit against the state for the removal of the students in 2001. Attorneys for Heartland told a jury "The goal was not to protect kids," "The goal was to shut down Heartland". The state insisted that they had the best interest of the students in mind.

=== 2021 Oversight legislation ===
In 2021, state lawmakers in Missouri proposed new legislation to provide oversight of unlicensed religious schools. Heartland negotiated with lawmakers on the wording of the law. The law mandated background checks for all employees of boarding school, mandated that unlicensed facilities notify the state that they existed, and required compliance with several assorted health and safety standards. After the law went into effect, Heartland sued the state, claiming the law violated their rights under both U.S. constitution and federal law. Republican Representative Rudy Veit of Wardsville expressed surprise regarding the lawsuit, stating he thought the school's concerns had been addressed.
