= Benjamin House (Shelbina, Missouri) =

Historic house in Missouri, United States

- U.S. National Register of Historic Places
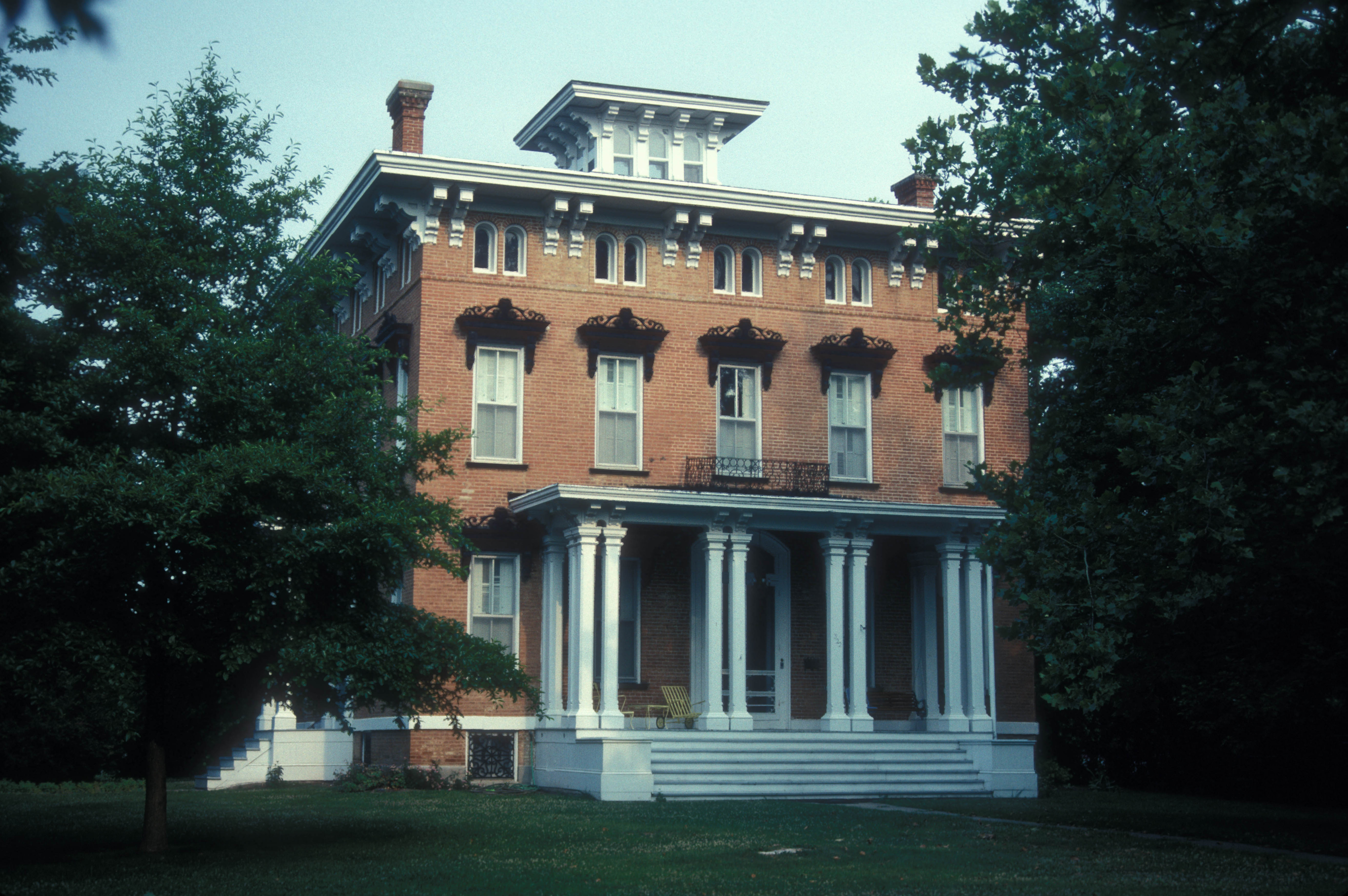
- Shelbina Mansion, January 2007

- Location within Missouri Location within the United States
- Location: 322 S. Shelby St., Shelbina, Missouri
- Coordinates: 39°41′23″N 92°2′47″W
- Area: 1.7 acres (0.69 ha)
- Built: 1872-1873
- Architect: Isaacs, Henry G.
- Architectural style: Italian Villa
- NRHP reference No.: 72000732
- Added to NRHP: June 27, 1972

Benjamin House, also known as the Benjamin (John Forbes) House and Vesper Place, is a historic home located at Shelbina, Shelby County, Missouri. It was built in 1872–1873, and is a three-story, Italian Villa brick dwelling over a full basement. It measures 35 feet wide by 60 feet deep and has three porches. It features a low-pitched hip roof, topped by a cupola and cast iron, bracketed canopies on the windows.

It was listed on the National Register of Historic Places in 1972.
