= Emden, Missouri =

Unincorporated community in Shelby County, Missouri, United States

Coordinates: 39°47′47″N 91°51′47″W

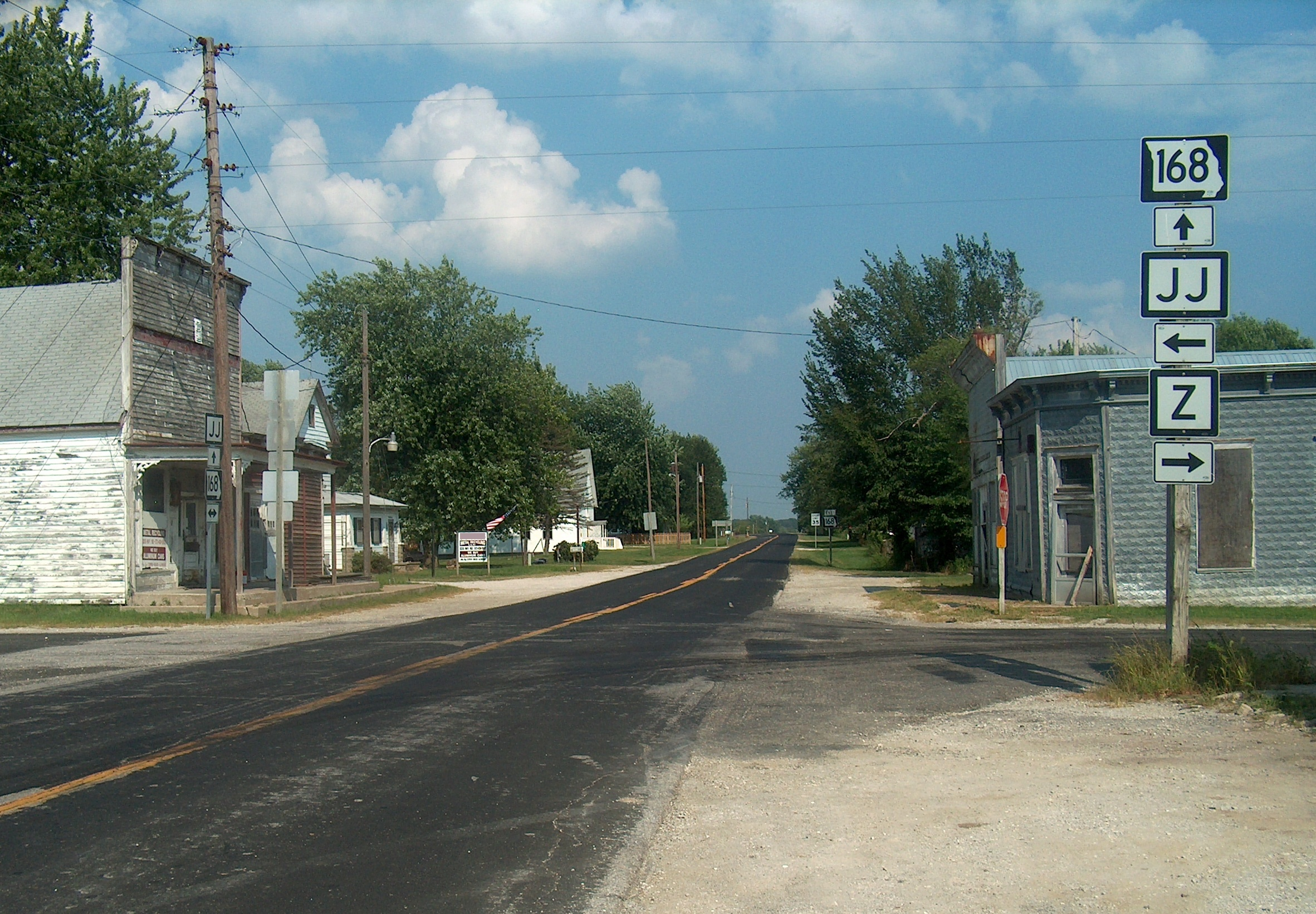
Emden, Missouri, U.S.

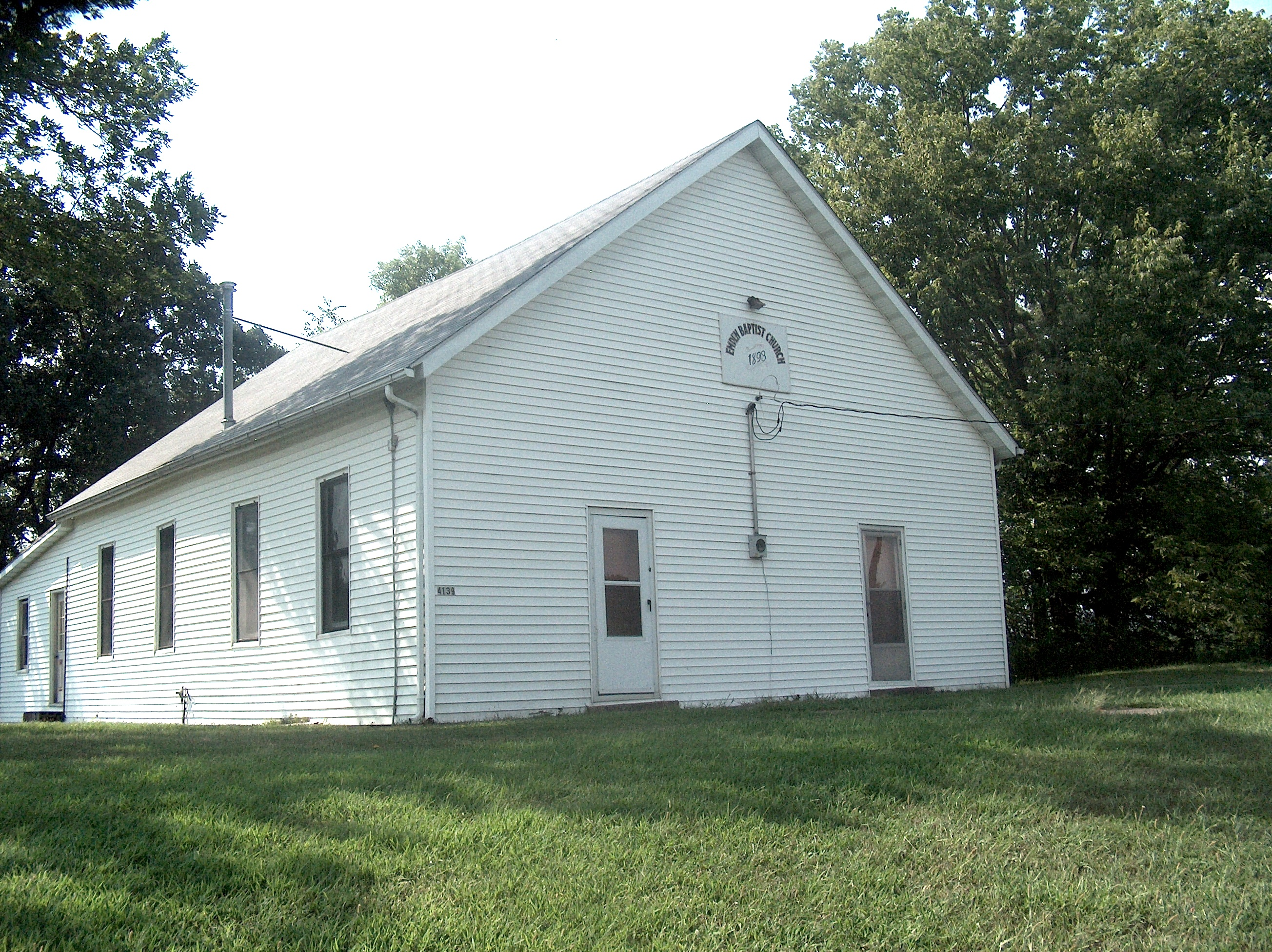
Emden Baptist Church

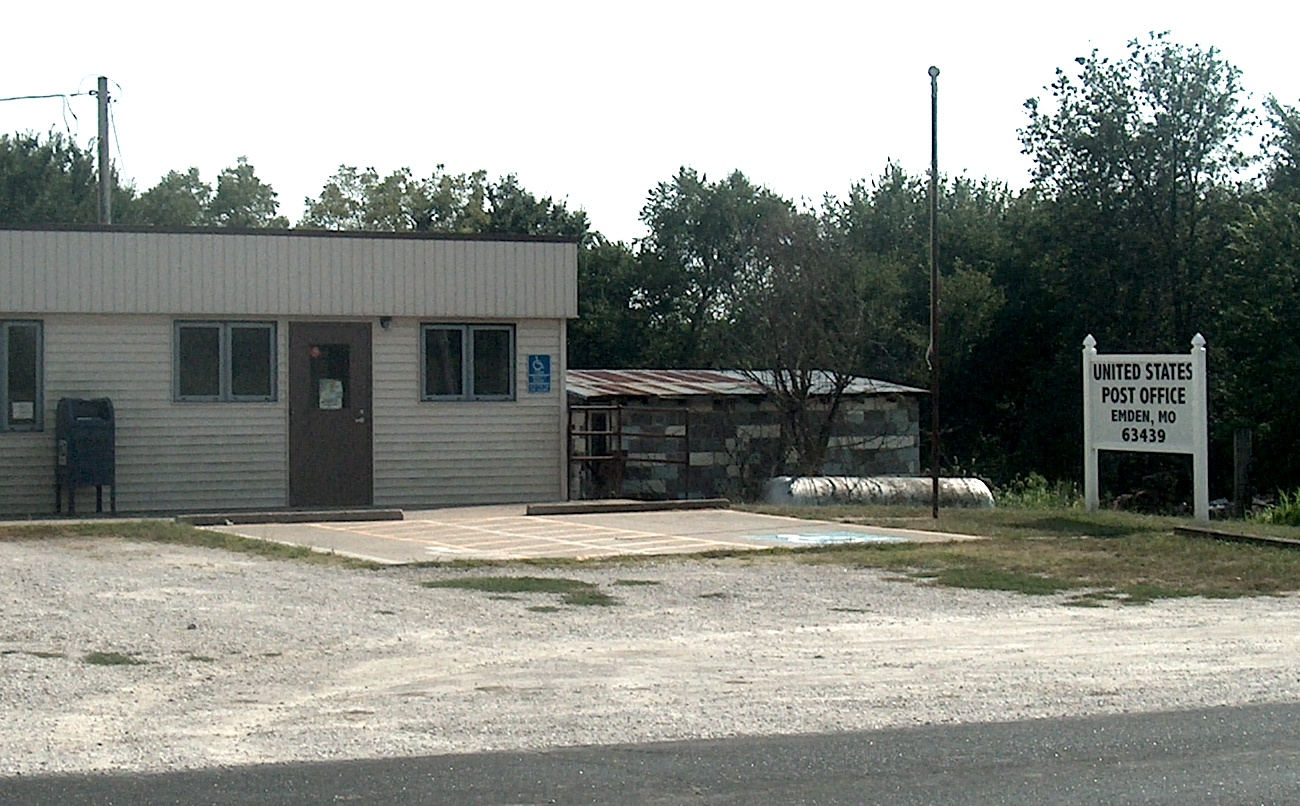
Emden Post Office

Emden is an unincorporated community in eastern Shelby County, Missouri, United States. It is located on Route 168 approximately nine miles east of Shelbyville.

== History ==
Emden was originally called "Dennison's Corner", and under the latter name got its start in the late 1880s when J. H. Dennison opened a country store at the site. The post office at Emden has been in operation since 1888. The present name is a transfer from Emden, Germany.
