= South Shelby High School =

Public school in Missouri, United States

Coordinates: 39.7097°N 92.1022°W

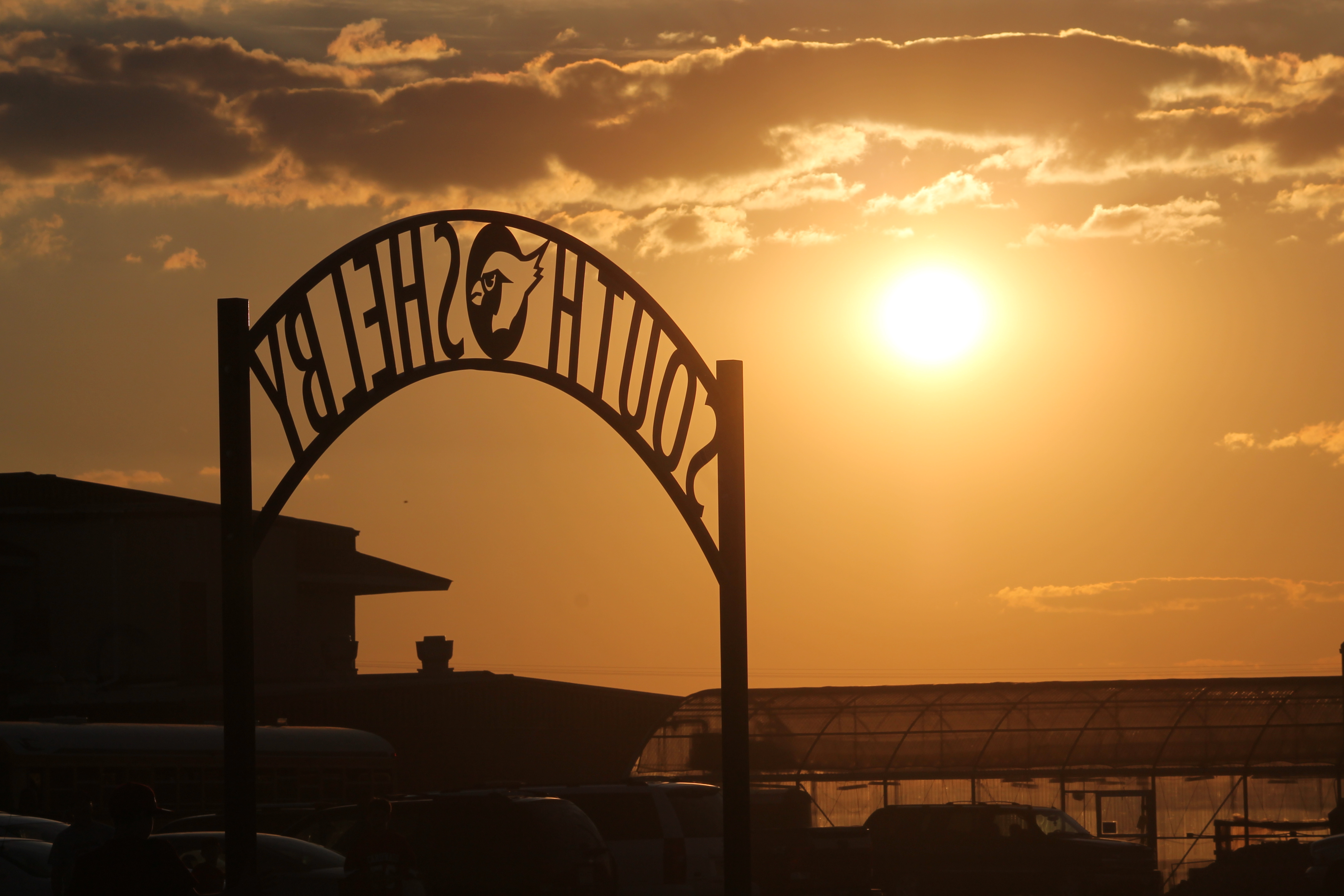

Location
- 4154 Highway 36; Shelbina, Shelby County, Missouri 63468; United States

Information
- Type: Public high school
- School district: Shelby County R-IV School District
- Principal: Curt Bowen
- Teaching staff: 19.07 (on an FTE basis)
- Enrollment: 227 (2024-2025)
- Student to teacher ratio: 11.90
- Colors: Red, white and blue
- Nickname: Cardinals/Ladybirds
- Website: www.cardinals.k12.mo.us

South Shelby High School is a school located in Shelbina, Missouri, United States. It is a part of the Shelby County R-IV School District.

It is home to the Cardinals and the LadyBirds. School colors are Red and Blue. Students between the grades of 9-12 have attended this school in Northeast Missouri since it first opened it doors to students on November 23, 1965. The school was built on 4154 Highway 36 at a geographically central location within the district and was the product of merging two separate school districts, Clarence and Shelbina. A middle school was later built in the 90's connecting to the high school. An elementary school was then later built in 2020, finally connecting the schools completely. South Shelby's current principal is Tim Maddex and Superintendent is Troy Clawson.

== Involvement ==
=== Extra curricular ===
The extra curricular activities that students can participate in, outside of sports, include the following:

- AFS Intercultural Programs
- Band
- Choir
- SS Extras
- Environmental Club
- Campus Bowl
- Family, Career and Community Leaders of America (FCCLA)
- Future Business Leaders of America (FBLA)
- The National FFA Organization (FFA)
- T.E.C.I.S. Yearbook
- Student Council (StuCo)
- Key Club
- National Honor Society (NHS)

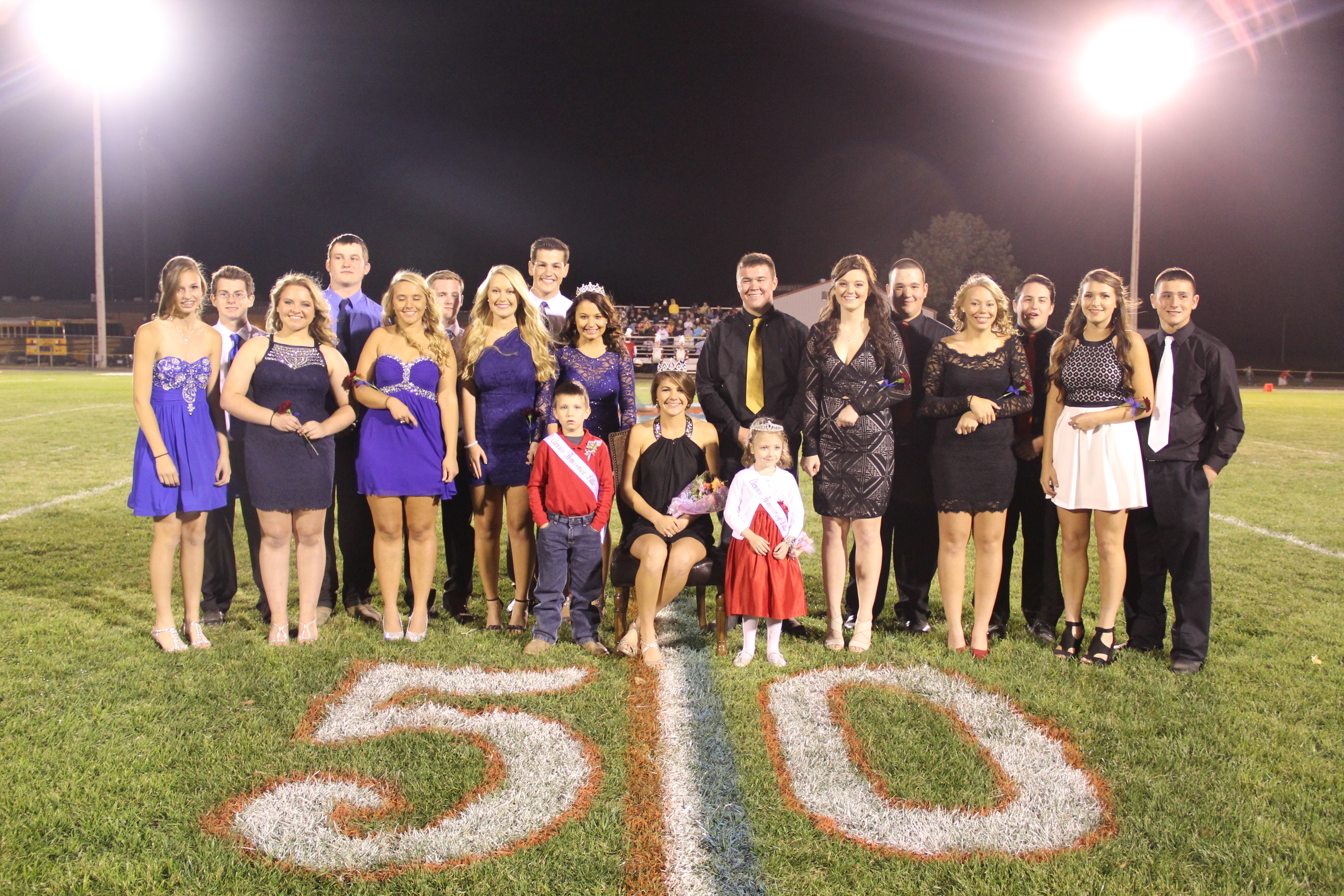
South Shelby's 2015 Homecoming Royalty

=== Athletics ===
South Shelby has been able to achieve many awards from their high school athletic teams throughout their existence. They are a part of the Clarence Cannon Conference and are under the guidelines of Missouri High School Activities Association (MSHSAA). Here are a listing of some of the sports South Shelby has available.

- Archery
- Baseball
- Basketball
- Cheerleading
- Cross Country
- 11 man Football
- Flag Line
- Golf
- Dance
- Softball
- Track and Field

=== Missouri State High School Athletic Association (MSHSAA) Records ===
One South Shelby player has a current men's basketball MSHSAA record in the category 'Records Broken by a Single Person, During one Quarter'. Over a lapse of an entire season South Shelby holds a record for the most "Three-point Shots Made" accomplished 28 during the 2008–2009 season.

South Shelby's newest sport Cross Country started in 2009, but only for women. Due to MSHSAA regulation they were not able to add it as a men's sport otherwise another women's sport would have to be added to equalize the number of sports for both genders.

There are four elite men from South Shelby who have current records on the state level during a single football game. As an overall team with an entire season worth of statistics South Shelby is ranked number one on "Total Interceptions" with two during the 2006 season with a total of 33. In 2010 they also rank for the most sacks having 49 total. Lastly, they are tied on number eight of "Total Game Shutouts" in 2006.

Postseason Team Records

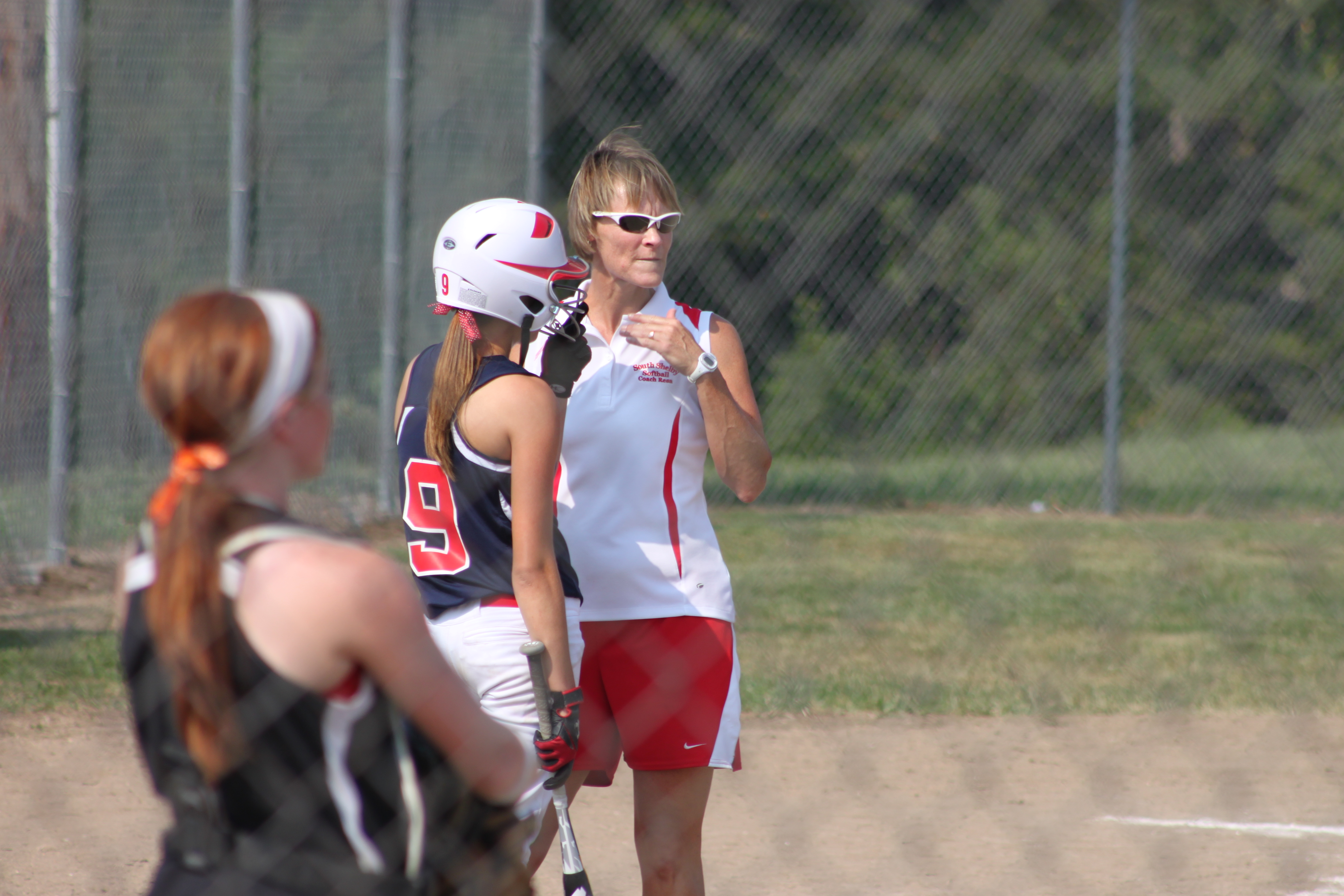
Softball Coach Angie Resa discusses the game plan with one of her players in between innings.

- State Champions-Football
  - 1970 Class 2-A
  - 2006 Class I
- State Runners Up-Football
  - 1971 Class 2-A
  - 1990 Class 2-A
  - 2011 Class I
- State Semi-Finalists-Football
  - 1968 Class 2-A
  - 1969 Class 2-A
  - 1975 Class 2-A
- District Champions-Football
  - 1988
  - 1989
  - 1990
  - 1991
  - 2000
  - 2001
  - 2004
  - 2005
  - 2006
  - 2007
  - 2008
  - 2009
  - 2010
  - 2011
  - 2012
  - 2014
  - 2015
  - 2023
- Boys State Basketball 3rd Place
  - 1990 Class II
- Girls State Basketball Champions
  - 1974 All Classes
- Girls State Basketball Runners Up
  - 1973 All Classes
  - 2008 Class III
- Girls State Basketball 3rd Place
  - 1975 Class I
- Girls District Cross-Country Champions
  - 2008 Class II
- Girls District Softball Champions
  - 2015 Class II

Current South Shelby LadyBirds Head Softball Coach is Sarah Elliot, who is also the high school Algebra B, Algebra 2, and Geometry teacher.
