= Epworth, Missouri =

Unincorporated community in Missouri, U.S.

Coordinates: 39°53′39″N 92°05′40″W

Epworth is an unincorporated community in Shelby County, in the U.S. state of Missouri.

== History ==
A post office called Epworth was established in 1891, and remained in operation until 1935. The community was named after a local Methodist church, which in turn was named after Epworth, Lincolnshire, an important place in Methodism.
