= Walkersville, Missouri =

Unincorporated community in Missouri, U.S.

Coordinates: 39°44′26″N 92°04′07″W

Walkersville is an unincorporated community in Shelby County, in the U.S. state of Missouri.

== History ==
Walkersville had its start in 1839 when a mill was built at the site. A post office called Walkersville was established in 1853, and remained in operation until 1891. The community was named after David O. Walker, proprietor of the early mill.
