= Kellerville, Missouri =

Unincorporated community in Missouri, U.S.

Coordinates: 39°49′19″N 92°08′06″W

Kellerville is an unincorporated community in Shelby County, in the U.S. state of Missouri.

Kellerville was founded circa 1906, at the time the railroad was built through the neighborhood. The community bears the name of the local Keller family. Variant names were "Keller Switch" and "Kellers".
