= Missouri Route 168 =

State highway in Missouri, U.S.

Route 168
- MO 168 highlighted in red

Route information
- Maintained by MoDOT
- Length: 42.578 mi (68.523 km)

Major junctions
- West end: Route 15 / Route K in Shelbyville
- US 24 / US 61 in Palmyra
- East end: US 61 / Route W in Hannibal

Location
- Country: United States
- State: Missouri

Highway system
- Missouri State Highway System; Interstate; US; State; Supplemental
← US 166	→ US 169

Route 168 is a highway in northeastern Missouri. Its eastern terminus is at U.S. Route 61 in Hannibal; its western terminus is at Route 15 in Shelbyville.

== Major intersections ==
County	Location	mi	km	Destinations	Notes
Shelby	Shelbyville	0.000	0.000	Route 15 (Jackson St) / Route K (Main Street)	
Marion	Palmyra	31.272	50.327	US 61 Bus. south (Main Street)	Western end of US 61 Business overlap
Marion	Palmyra	32.502– 32.767	52.307– 52.733	US 24 / US 61 (Avenue of the Saints) / Great River Road / US 61 Bus. ends – Hannibal, Quincy, IL, Monroe City, Canton	Eastern end of US 61 Business overlap; western end of Great River Road overlap
Marion	Hannibal	42.547	68.473	US 61 (Avenue of the Saints) / Great River Road to US 36 – Palmyra	Eastern end of Great River Road overlap
Marion	Hannibal	42.578	68.523	Route W (Palmyra Road)	
1.000 mi = 1.609 km; 1.000 km = 0.621 mi: Concurrency terminus
