= Enterprise, Shelby County, Missouri =

Unincorporated community in Missouri, U.S.

Coordinates: 39°38′56″N 92°15′37″W

Enterprise
- Interactive map of Enterprise
- Time zone: UTC-5
- Area code: 573

Enterprise is an unincorporated community in Shelby County, in the U.S. state of Missouri.

== History ==
Enterprise sprang up in the early 1880s around a general store. A post office called Enterprise was established in 1885, and remained in operation until 1907.
