= Burksville, Missouri =

Unincorporated community in Missouri, U.S.

Coordinates: 39°51′43″N 91°55′03″W

Burksville is an unincorporated community in Shelby County, in the U.S. state of Missouri.

== History ==
A post office called Burksville was established in 1892, and remained in operation until 1907. John T. Burk, a local merchant and early postmaster, gave the community his last name.
