= Garnett Branch =

Stream in the US state of Missouri

Coordinates: 39.9342065°N 92.0782320°W

Garnett Branch (also spelled Garnet Branch) is a stream in the U.S. state of Missouri.

Garnett Branch has the name of the local Garnet family.

== See also ==
- List of rivers of Missouri
