= Maud, Missouri =

Unincorporated community in Missouri, U.S.

Coordinates: 39°38′00″N 92°11′44″W

Maud is an unincorporated community in Shelby County, in the U.S. state of Missouri.

== History ==
A post office called Maud was established in 1880, and remained in operation until 1903. An early postmaster, Peter Ridings, gave the community the name of his daughter, Maud Ridings. The population of the town in 1935 was 22.
