= Kirby, Missouri =

Unincorporated community in Missouri, U.S.

Coordinates: 39°50′44″N 92°06′53″W

Kirby is an unincorporated community in Shelby County, in the U.S. state of Missouri.

== History ==
A post office called Kirby was established in 1882, and remained in operation until 1906. The community bears the name of the local Kirby family.
