= Kendall, Missouri =

Unincorporated community in Missouri, U.S.

Coordinates: 39.716707°N 91.917112°W

Kendall is an unincorporated community in Shelby County, in the U.S. state of Missouri.

== History ==
A post office called Kendall was established in 1889, and remained in operation until 1902. The name may be a transfer from Kendal, in England.
