= Plevna, Missouri =

- Census-designated place
- Location within Missouri Location within the United States
- Coordinates: 39°58′25″N 92°05′11″W
- Country: United States
- State: Missouri
- County: Knox

Area
  - Total: 1.28 sq mi (3.32 km^{2})
  - Land: 1.28 sq mi (3.32 km^{2})
  - Water: 0.0039 sq mi (0.01 km^{2})
- Elevation: 791 ft (241 m)

Population (2020)
  - Total: 7
  - Density: 5.5/sq mi (2.11/km^{2})
- Time zone: UTC-6 (Central (CST))
  - Summer (DST): UTC-5 (CDT)
- ZIP code: 63469
- Area code: 660
- FIPS code: 29-58574
- GNIS feature ID: 735795

Plevna is an unincorporated community and census-designated place in southeastern Knox County, Missouri, United States. It is located approximately 17 miles (27 km) southeast of Edina on Missouri Route 15. As of the 2020 census, its population was 7.

Plevna was platted in 1877. According to author and name historian Robert Ramsay, the community is named after Plevna, Bulgaria, site of a Russian victory at the Siege of Plevna during the Russo-Turkish War. A post office was established at Plevna in 1877.

== Demographics ==
Historical population
Census	Pop.	Note	%±
2020	7		—
U.S. Decennial Census

== Education ==
It is in the Knox County R-I School District.
