= Oakdale, Missouri =

Unincorporated community in Missouri, U.S.

Coordinates: 39°45′38″N 91°55′59″W

Oakdale is an unincorporated community in Shelby County, in the U.S. state of Missouri.

== History ==
A post office called "Oak Dale" was established in 1878, and remained in operation until 1905. The area was descriptively named.
