= Missouri Route 15 =

State highway in Missouri, U.S.

Route 15

Route information
- Maintained by MoDOT
- Length: 118 mi (190 km)
- Existed: 1922–present

Major junctions
- South end: US 54 / US 54 Bus. in Mexico
- US 24 near Paris; US 36 / Route 110 (CKC) in Shelbina; US 136 / US 136 Bus. in Memphis
- North end: CR V56 near Milton, IA

Location
- Country: United States
- State: Missouri

Highway system
- Missouri State Highway System; Interstate; US; State; Supplemental
| ← Route 14 | → Route 16 |

Route 15 is a highway in northeast Missouri. Its northern terminus is at the Iowa state line about thirteen miles (21 km) north of Memphis; its southern terminus is at U.S. Route 54 in Mexico. Route 15 serves as a key north-south corridor in northeast Missouri, with its busiest portion supportnig transport for more than 2,000 rural Missourians.

== Route description ==
Beginning at US 54 in Mexico, Route 15 travels north through Audrain County. Shortly after its starting point, the highway intersects Route 22 and continues northward through rural farmland. Route 15 then passes through Paris, where it intersects US 24 and Route 154 before continuing into Shelby County.

In Shelby County, Route 15 reaches Shelbina, where it intersects US 36 and Route 110. The highway then continues northward, passing through Shelbyville before entering Knox County. In Knox County, Route 15 intersects Route 6 near Edina and continues northward toward Scotland County.

Upon reaching Scotland County, Route 15 intersects US 136 in Memphis, forming a brief concurrency before separating again north of the city. The highway then reaches its northern terminus at the Iowa state line near Milton, connecting with Iowa County Highway V56.

== History ==
Route 15 is one of the original 1922 Missouri highways, though its southern terminus was significantly farther at Route 71 (now U.S. Route 65) at Buffalo. It was replaced by U.S. Route 54 from Mexico to southwest of Macks Creek and by Route 73 from that point to Buffalo.

== Major intersections ==
| County | Location | mi | km | Destinations | Notes |
|---|---|---|---|---|---|
| Audrain | Mexico | | | US 54 / Route D / US 54 Bus. – Bowling Green, Jefferson City, Auxvasse | interchange; southern end of US 54 Bus. / Route 22 overlap |
| Audrain | Mexico | | | US 54 Bus. east (Boulevard Street) / S. Clark Street | northern end of US 54 Bus. overlap |
| Audrain | Mexico | | | Route 22 (Monroe Street) – Centralia | northern end of Route 22 overlap |
| Monroe | | | | Route 154 – Perry | southern end of Route 154 overlap |
| Monroe | Paris | | | US 24 Bus. / Route 154 – Madison | northern end of Route 154 overlap; southern end of US 24 Bus. overlap |
| Monroe | | | | US 24 / US 24 Bus. – Madison, Monroe City, Paris | northern end of US 24 Bus. overlap |
| Shelby | Shelbina | | | US 36 Bus. (Maple Street) | |
| Shelby | Shelbina | | | US 36 / Route 110 (CKC) – Macon, Monroe City | interchange |
| Shelby | Shelbyville | | | Route 168 (Main Street) / Route K – Hagers Grove, Emden | |
| Knox | | | | Route 156 – Newark | southern end of Route 156 overlap; access to Henry Sever Lake Conservation Area |
| Knox | | | | Route 156 / Route 151 – Novelty | northern end of Route 156 overlap |
| Knox | | | | Route 6 – Kirksville | southern end of Route 6 overlap |
| Knox | Edina | | | Route 6 – Knox City | northern end of Route 6 overlap |
| Knox | | | | Route 11 south / Route K east – Adair, Baring | |
| Scotland | | | | US 136 west – Lancaster | southern end of US 136 overlap |
| Scotland | Memphis | | | US 136 east – Kahoka | northern end of US 136 overlap; southern end of US 136 Bus. overlap |
| Scotland | Memphis | | | US 136 Bus. east (Monroe Street) | northern end of US 136 Bus. overlap |
| Scotland | | | | CR V56 north – Milton | former Iowa 15 |
1.000 mi = 1.609 km; 1.000 km = 0.621 mi
