= Shelbina, Missouri =

City in Shelby County, Missouri, United States

- City
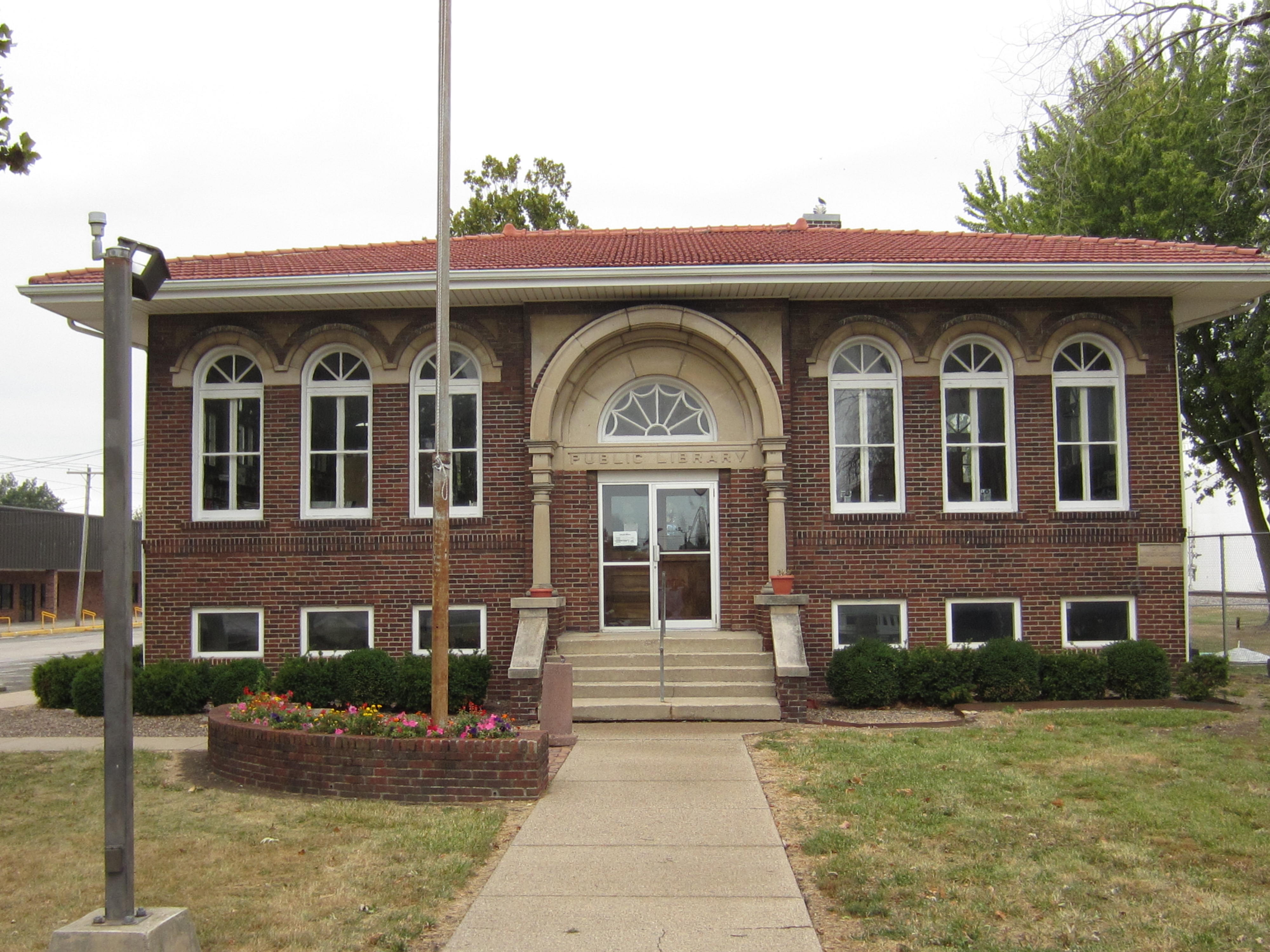
- Public library, Shelbina

- Location of Shelbina, Missouri
- Coordinates: 39°41′32″N 92°2′23″W
- Country: United States
- State: Missouri
- County: Shelby

Area
  - Total: 2.34 sq mi (6.05 km^{2})
  - Land: 2.34 sq mi (6.05 km^{2})
  - Water: 0 sq mi (0.00 km^{2})
- Elevation: 778 ft (237 m)

Population (2020)
  - Total: 1,613
  - Density: 690.3/sq mi (266.53/km^{2})
- Time zone: UTC-6 (Central (CST))
  - Summer (DST): UTC-5 (CDT)
- ZIP code: 63468
- Area code: 573
- FIPS code: 29-67178
- GNIS feature ID: 0726302
- Website: www.cityofshelbina.com

Shelbina (/ʃɛlˈbaɪnə/ shel-BY-nə) is a city in southern Shelby County, Missouri, United States. The population was 1,613 at the 2020 census.

== History ==
Shelbina was platted in 1857 when the railroad was extended to that point. The name "Shelbina" is derived from Shelby County. A post office called Shelbina has been in operation since 1858.

The Benjamin House was listed on the National Register of Historic Places in 1972.

== Demographics ==
Historical population
Census	Pop.	Note	%±
1870	1,145		—
1880	1,289		12.6%
1890	1,691		31.2%
1900	1,733		2.5%
1910	2,174		25.4%
1920	1,809		−16.8%
1930	1,826		0.9%
1940	2,107		15.4%
1950	2,113		0.3%
1960	2,067		−2.2%
1970	2,060		−0.3%
1980	2,169		5.3%
1990	2,172		0.1%
2000	1,943		−10.5%
2010	1,704		−12.3%
2020	1,613		−5.3%
U.S. Decennial Census

=== 2020 census ===
As of the 2020 census, Shelbina had a population of 1,613. The median age was 44.2 years. 23.2% of residents were under the age of 18 and 25.2% of residents were 65 years of age or older. For every 100 females there were 90.7 males, and for every 100 females age 18 and over there were 84.8 males age 18 and over.

0.0% of residents lived in urban areas, while 100.0% lived in rural areas.

There were 691 households in Shelbina, of which 28.1% had children under the age of 18 living in them. Of all households, 41.2% were married-couple households, 20.3% were households with a male householder and no spouse or partner present, and 32.1% were households with a female householder and no spouse or partner present. About 37.5% of all households were made up of individuals and 20.4% had someone living alone who was 65 years of age or older.

There were 780 housing units, of which 11.4% were vacant. The homeowner vacancy rate was 1.7% and the rental vacancy rate was 13.5%.

Racial composition as of the 2020 census
Race	Number	Percent
White	1,528	94.7%
Black or African American	3	0.2%
American Indian and Alaska Native	5	0.3%
Asian	0	0.0%
Native Hawaiian and Other Pacific Islander	1	0.1%
Some other race	2	0.1%
Two or more races	74	4.6%
Hispanic or Latino (of any race)	28	1.7%

=== 2010 census ===
As of the census of 2010, there were 1,704 people, 717 households, and 443 families living in the city. The population density was 728.2 inhabitants per square mile (281.2/km^{2}). There were 860 housing units at an average density of 367.5 per square mile (141.9/km^{2}). The racial makeup of the city was 98.8% White, 0.5% African American, 0.1% Native American, 0.1% Asian, and 0.5% from two or more races. Hispanic or Latino of any race were 1.1% of the population.

There were 717 households, of which 29.3% had children under the age of 18 living with them, 46.4% were married couples living together, 9.9% had a female householder with no husband present, 5.4% had a male householder with no wife present, and 38.2% were non-families. 34.4% of all households were made up of individuals, and 17% had someone living alone who was 65 years of age or older. The average household size was 2.27 and the average family size was 2.85.

The median age in the city was 43.5 years. 23.5% of residents were under the age of 18; 6.7% were between the ages of 18 and 24; 21.1% were from 25 to 44; 26.4% were from 45 to 64; and 22.2% were 65 years of age or older. The gender makeup of the city was 47.5% male and 52.5% female.

=== 2000 census ===
As of the census of 2000, there were 1,943 people, 843 households, and 503 families living in the city. The population density was 844.4 inhabitants per square mile (326.0/km^{2}). There were 966 housing units at an average density of 419.8 per square mile (162.1/km^{2}). The racial makeup of the city was 98.10% White, 0.77% African American, 0.72% Native American, 0.05% from other races, and 0.36% from two or more races. Hispanic or Latino of any race were 0.26% of the population.

There were 843 households, out of which 28.5% had children under the age of 18 living with them, 46.5% were married couples living together, 9.3% had a female householder with no husband present, and 40.3% were non-families. 37.5% of all households were made up of individuals, and 22.7% had someone living alone who was 65 years of age or older. The average household size was 2.19 and the average family size was 2.91.

In the city the population was spread out, with 22.8% under the age of 18, 7.9% from 18 to 24, 22.1% from 25 to 44, 21.3% from 45 to 64, and 25.9% who were 65 years of age or older. The median age was 43 years. For every 100 females there were 80.4 males. For every 100 females age 18 and over, there were 74.8 males.

The median income for a household in the city was $25,800, and the median income for a family was $33,529. Males had a median income of $26,393 versus $18,712 for females. The per capita income for the city was $17,645. About 12.3% of families and 16.8% of the population were below the poverty line, including 25.1% of those under age 18 and 12.0% of those age 65 or over.

== Geography ==
Shelbina is located in south central Shelby County at the intersection of US Route 36 and Missouri Route 15. It is two miles north of the Shelby-Monroe county line. Shelbyville is seven miles to the north along Route 15. The headwaters of Clear Creek arise just to the west of the city.

According to the United States Census Bureau, the city has a total area of 2.34 square miles (6.06 km^{2}), all land.

=== Climate ===
Climate data for Shelbina, Missouri (1991–2020 normals, extremes 1928–present)
Month	Jan	Feb	Mar	Apr	May	Jun	Jul	Aug	Sep	Oct	Nov	Dec	Year
Record high °F (°C)	73 (23)	80 (27)	85 (29)	94 (34)	94 (34)	104 (40)	112 (44)	104 (40)	104 (40)	95 (35)	82 (28)	74 (23)	112 (44)
Mean daily maximum °F (°C)	35.7 (2.1)	40.9 (4.9)	52.7 (11.5)	64.4 (18.0)	73.7 (23.2)	82.9 (28.3)	86.6 (30.3)	85.0 (29.4)	78.8 (26.0)	66.8 (19.3)	52.4 (11.3)	40.2 (4.6)	63.3 (17.4)
Daily mean °F (°C)	26.4 (−3.1)	30.8 (−0.7)	41.6 (5.3)	52.7 (11.5)	63.0 (17.2)	72.4 (22.4)	76.1 (24.5)	73.9 (23.3)	66.3 (19.1)	54.8 (12.7)	41.8 (5.4)	31.4 (−0.3)	52.6 (11.4)
Mean daily minimum °F (°C)	17.1 (−8.3)	20.8 (−6.2)	30.6 (−0.8)	41.0 (5.0)	52.3 (11.3)	61.9 (16.6)	65.6 (18.7)	62.9 (17.2)	53.9 (12.2)	42.7 (5.9)	31.2 (−0.4)	22.5 (−5.3)	41.9 (5.5)
Record low °F (°C)	−30 (−34)	−24 (−31)	−20 (−29)	10 (−12)	28 (−2)	37 (3)	41 (5)	35 (2)	23 (−5)	12 (−11)	−10 (−23)	−24 (−31)	−30 (−34)
Average precipitation inches (mm)	1.77 (45)	2.06 (52)	2.88 (73)	4.25 (108)	5.26 (134)	5.29 (134)	4.53 (115)	4.22 (107)	3.90 (99)	3.29 (84)	2.64 (67)	1.99 (51)	42.08 (1,069)
Average snowfall inches (cm)	5.7 (14)	3.9 (9.9)	1.7 (4.3)	0.3 (0.76)	0.0 (0.0)	0.0 (0.0)	0.0 (0.0)	0.0 (0.0)	0.0 (0.0)	0.0 (0.0)	0.9 (2.3)	3.4 (8.6)	15.9 (40)
Average precipitation days (≥ 0.01 in)	6.3	6.7	9.8	10.4	12.2	9.6	8.2	8.1	7.2	7.9	7.7	7.1	101.2
Average snowy days (≥ 0.1 in)	3.0	2.9	1.0	0.1	0.0	0.0	0.0	0.0	0.0	0.0	0.5	2.3	9.8
Source: NOAA

== Education ==
Public education in Shelbina is administered by Shelby County R-IV School District, which operates one elementary school, one middle school and South Shelby High School.

Shelbina has a lending library, the Shelbina Carnegie Public Library.

== Notable people ==
- Willard Robison (1894–1968); musician, composer of popular songs
- Sam Walton, founder of Walmart
- Duke Cunningham, US Navy fighter pilot during the Vietnam War, former U.S. Congressman (R) from California, and jailed for corruption, i.e. taking bribes for his vote, and selling his political influence.

== See also ==
- List of cities in Missouri
