= Hagers Grove, Missouri =

Unincorporated community in Missouri, U.S.

Coordinates: 39°49′52″N 92°13′24″W

Hagers Grove is an unincorporated community in Shelby County, in the U.S. state of Missouri.

== History ==
A post office called Hager's Grove was established in 1851, and remained in operation until 1915. The community has the name of John Hager, the original owner of the town site.
