= Bourbon Township, Knox County, Missouri =

Inactive township in the American state of Missouri

Coordinates: 39.9986°N 92.1133°W

Bourbon Township is an inactive township in Knox County, in the U.S. state of Missouri.

Bourbon Township was established in 1872, and named for the fact a large share of the early settlers were Bourbon Democrats.
