= Shelbyville, Missouri =

City in Missouri, U.S.

- City
- Location of Shelbyville, Missouri
- Coordinates: 39°48′26″N 92°02′25″W
- Country: United States
- State: Missouri
- County: Shelby

Area
  - Total: 0.82 sq mi (2.12 km^{2})
  - Land: 0.78 sq mi (2.01 km^{2})
  - Water: 0.042 sq mi (0.11 km^{2})
- Elevation: 768 ft (234 m)

Population (2020)
  - Total: 518
  - Density: 667.6/sq mi (257.75/km^{2})
- Time zone: UTC-6 (Central (CST))
  - Summer (DST): UTC-5 (CDT)
- ZIP code: 63469
- Area code: 573
- FIPS code: 29-67196
- GNIS feature ID: 2395866
- Website: shelbyvillemo.com

Shelbyville is a city in and the county seat of Shelby County, Missouri, United States. The population was 518 at the 2020 census.

== History ==
Shelbyville was platted in 1836. Like the county in which it is located, Shelbyville was named for Governor Isaac Shelby of Kentucky. A post office has been in operation at Shelbyville since 1836.

== Geography ==
The city is in central Shelby County at the intersection of Missouri routes 15 and 168. Black Creek flows past the west and south sides of the city.

According to the United States Census Bureau, the city has a total area of 0.82 square miles (2.12 km^{2}), of which, 0.78 square miles (2.02 km^{2}) is land and 0.04 square miles (0.10 km^{2}) is water.

== Demographics ==
Historical population
Census	Pop.	Note	%±
1850	359		—
1860	440		22.6%
1870	530		20.5%
1880	619		16.8%
1890	486		−21.5%
1900	777		59.9%
1910	685		−11.8%
1920	690		0.7%
1930	704		2.0%
1940	756		7.4%
1950	635		−16.0%
1960	657		3.5%
1970	601		−8.5%
1980	645		7.3%
1990	582		−9.8%
2000	682		17.2%
2010	552		−19.1%
2020	518		−6.2%
U.S. Decennial Census

=== 2010 census ===
As of the census of 2010, there were 552 people, 240 households, and 151 families living in the city. The population density was 707.7 inhabitants per square mile (273.2/km^{2}). There were 279 housing units at an average density of 357.7 per square mile (138.1/km^{2}). The racial makeup of the city was 98.4% White, 0.4% African American, 0.2% Native American, and 1.1% from two or more races. Hispanic or Latino of any race were 1.3% of the population.

There were 240 households, of which 27.1% had children under the age of 18 living with them, 51.3% were married couples living together, 9.6% had a female householder with no husband present, 2.1% had a male householder with no wife present, and 37.1% were non-families. 33.8% of all households were made up of individuals, and 16.7% had someone living alone who was 65 years of age or older. The average household size was 2.27 and the average family size was 2.85.

The median age in the city was 44.8 years. 23.6% of residents were under the age of 18; 6.3% were between the ages of 18 and 24; 20.3% were from 25 to 44; 29.1% were from 45 to 64; and 20.7% were 65 years of age or older. The gender makeup of the city was 48.4% male and 51.6% female.

=== 2000 census ===
As of the census of 2000, there were 682 people, 262 households, and 164 families living in the city. The population density was 881.2 inhabitants per square mile (340.2/km^{2}). There were 291 housing units at an average density of 376.0 per square mile (145.2/km^{2}). The racial makeup of the city was 97.21% White, 0.44% African American, 0.73% Asian, 0.29% from other races, and 1.32% from two or more races. Hispanic or Latino of any race were 1.47% of the population.

There were 262 households, out of which 30.5% had children under the age of 18 living with them, 51.1% were married couples living together, 9.2% had a female householder with no husband present, and 37.4% were non-families. 35.9% of all households were made up of individuals, and 19.1% had someone living alone who was 65 years of age or older. The average household size was 2.26 and the average family size was 2.95.

In the city, the population was spread out, with 28.7% under the age of 18, 6.2% from 18 to 24, 25.2% from 25 to 44, 22.0% from 45 to 64, and 17.9% who were 65 years of age or older. The median age was 39 years. For every 100 females there were 98.3 males. For every 100 females age 18 and over, there were 104.2 males.

As of 2000 the median income for a household was $28,542, and the median income for a family was $36,944. Males had a median income of $24,844 versus $20,288 for females. The per capita income for the city was $13,759. About 8.1% of families and 16.1% of the population were below the poverty line, including 12.0% of those under age 18 and 35.7% of those age 65 or over.

== Notable people ==
- Edward McKendree Bounds, attorney, author and prominent clergyman of the Methodist Episcopal Church South.
- Ruth Osburn, athlete
- Norm Stewart, former University of Missouri basketball coach.

== See also ==
- List of cities in Missouri
