= Clarence, Missouri =

- City
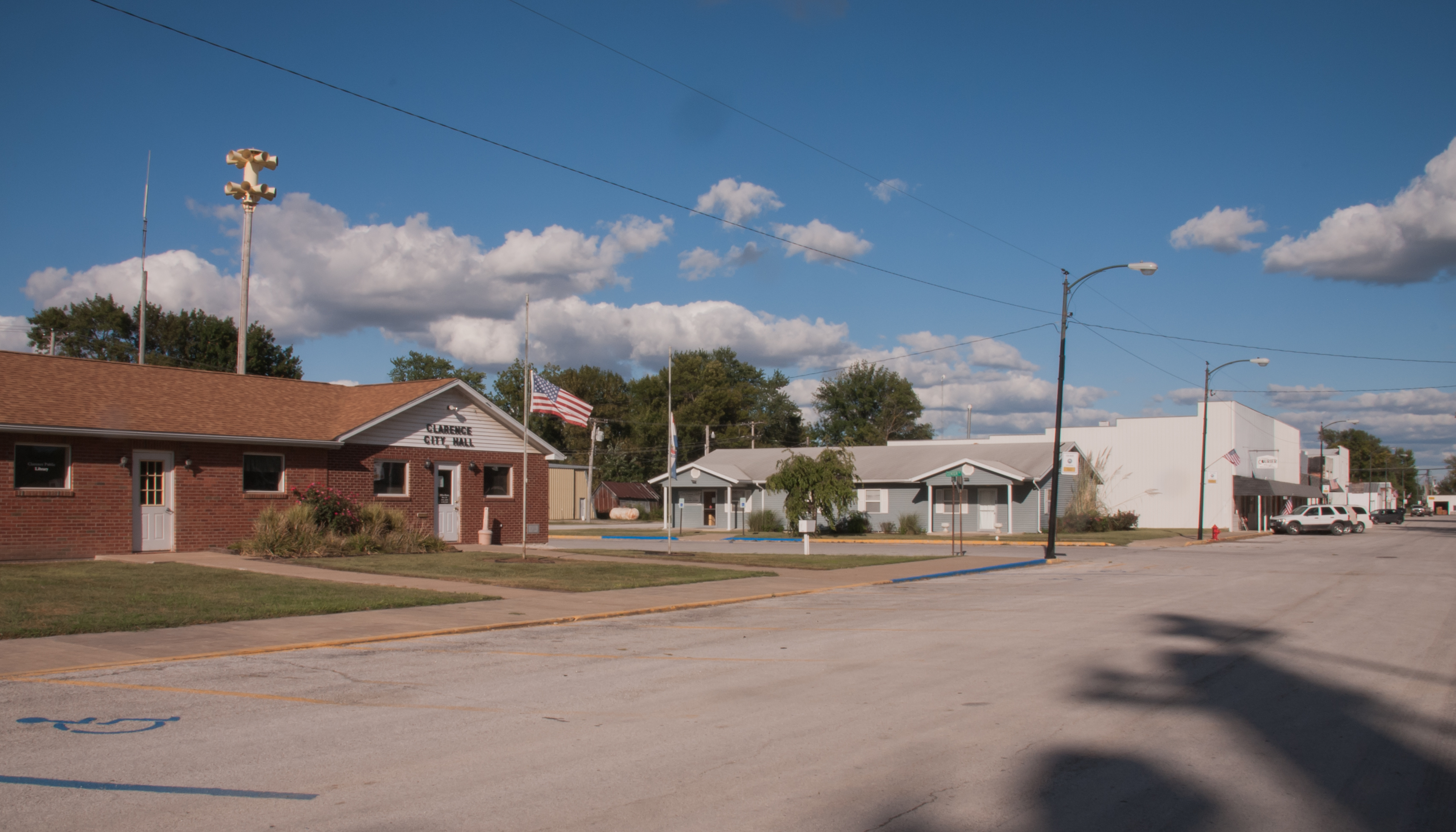

- Location of Clarence, Missouri
- Coordinates: 39°44′34″N 92°15′40″W
- Country: United States
- State: Missouri
- County: Shelby

Area
  - Total: 1.16 sq mi (3.00 km^{2})
  - Land: 1.16 sq mi (3.00 km^{2})
  - Water: 0 sq mi (0.00 km^{2})
- Elevation: 820 ft (250 m)

Population (2020)
  - Total: 738
  - Density: 637.6/sq mi (246.18/km^{2})
- Time zone: UTC-6 (Central (CST))
  - Summer (DST): UTC-5 (CDT)
- ZIP code: 63437
- Area code: 660
- FIPS code: 29-13978
- GNIS feature ID: 0715868
- Website: www.cityofclarence.com

Clarence is a city in western Shelby County, Missouri, United States. The population was 738 at the 2020 census.

== History ==
Clarence was founded in 1857. According to tradition, the community has the name of Clarence Duff, the son of a pioneer citizen. A post office called Clarence has been in operation since 1859.

== Geography ==
Clarence is located in southwest Shelby County on Missouri Route 151 along the south side of U.S. Route 36 approximately ten miles east of Macon in adjacent Macon County.

According to the United States Census Bureau, the city has a total area of 1.16 square miles (3.00 km^{2}), all land.

== Demographics ==
Historical population
Census	Pop.	Note	%±
1870	444		—
1880	570		28.4%
1890	1,078		89.1%
1900	1,184		9.8%
1910	1,322		11.7%
1920	1,400		5.9%
1930	1,286		−8.1%
1940	1,157		−10.0%
1950	1,123		−2.9%
1960	1,103		−1.8%
1970	1,050		−4.8%
1980	1,147		9.2%
1990	1,026		−10.5%
2000	915		−10.8%
2010	813		−11.1%
2020	738		−9.2%
U.S. Decennial Census

2010 census As of the census of 2010, there were 813 people, 355 households, and 199 families living in the city. The population density was 700.9 inhabitants per square mile (270.6/km^{2}). There were 439 housing units at an average density of 378.4 per square mile (146.1/km^{2}). The racial makeup of the city was 98.0% White, 0.5% African American, 0.2% Native American, 0.1% from other races, and 1.1% from two or more races. Hispanic or Latino of any race were 1.4% of the population.

There were 355 households, of which 28.2% had children under the age of 18 living with them, 40.8% were married couples living together, 11.8% had a female householder with no husband present, 3.4% had a male householder with no wife present, and 43.9% were non-families. 40.6% of all households were made up of individuals, and 21.4% had someone living alone who was 65 years of age or older. The average household size was 2.17 and the average family size was 2.94.

The median age in the city was 43.3 years. 26% of residents were under the age of 18; 4.3% were between the ages of 18 and 24; 21.3% were from 25 to 44; 24.3% were from 45 to 64; and 23.9% were 65 years of age or older. The gender makeup of the city was 46.9% male and 53.1% female.

=== 2000 census ===
As of the census of 2000, there were 915 people, 398 households, and 228 families living in the city. The population density was 784.9 inhabitants per square mile (303.1/km^{2}). There were 466 housing units at an average density of 399.8 per square mile (154.4/km^{2}). The racial makeup of the city was 98.25% White, 0.44% African American, 0.33% Native American, 0.11% Asian, and 0.87% from two or more races. Hispanic or Latino of any race were 0.33% of the population.

There were 398 households, out of which 25.4% had children under the age of 18 living with them, 47.0% were married couples living together, 8.5% had a female householder with no husband present, and 42.7% were non-families. 39.2% of all households were made up of individuals, and 24.1% had someone living alone who was 65 years of age or older. The average household size was 2.20 and the average family size was 3.00.

In the city the population was spread out, with 23.1% under the age of 18, 8.2% from 18 to 24, 22.2% from 25 to 44, 23.3% from 45 to 64, and 23.3% who were 65 years of age or older. The median age was 42 years. For every 100 females there were 81.2 males. For every 100 females age 18 and over, there were 77.8 males.

The median income for a household in the city was $21,513, and the median income for a family was $31,397. Males had a median income of $20,469 versus $16,518 for females. The per capita income for the city was $12,970. About 16.1% of families and 19.0% of the population were below the poverty line, including 26.0% of those under age 18 and 17.2% of those age 65 or over.

== Education ==
Clarence is served by Shelby County R-IV School District. The city has a lending library, the Clarence Public Library.

== Notable people ==
- Larissa Schuster, convicted murderer
