= Novelty, Missouri =

- Village
- Location of Novelty, Missouri
- Coordinates: 40°0′45″N 92°12′30″W
- Country: United States
- State: Missouri
- County: Knox

Area
  - Total: 0.28 sq mi (0.73 km^{2})
  - Land: 0.28 sq mi (0.73 km^{2})
  - Water: 0 sq mi (0.00 km^{2})
- Elevation: 837 ft (255 m)

Population (2020)
  - Total: 102
  - Density: 364.1/sq mi (140.59/km^{2})
- Time zone: UTC-6 (Central (CST))
  - Summer (DST): UTC-5 (CDT)
- ZIP code: 63460
- Area code: 660
- FIPS code: 29-53516
- GNIS feature ID: 0723529

Novelty is a village in Knox County, Missouri, United States. As of the 2020 census, its population was 102.

== History ==
Novelty was platted in 1857, and named for the novelty goods sold by a local merchant. A post office called Novelty has been in operation since 1854.

== Geography ==
According to the United States Census Bureau, the village has a total area of 0.28 square miles (0.73 km^{2}), all land.

== Demographics ==
Historical population
Census	Pop.	Note	%±
1880	138		—
1900	267		—
1910	232		−13.1%
1920	277		19.4%
1930	248		−10.5%
1940	207		−16.5%
1950	188		−9.2%
1960	176		−6.4%
1970	156		−11.4%
1980	187		19.9%
1990	143		−23.5%
2000	119		−16.8%
2010	139		16.8%
2020	102		−26.6%
U.S. Decennial Census

=== 2010 census ===
As of the census of 2010, there were 139 people, 61 households, and 43 families living in the village. The population density was 496.4 inhabitants per square mile (191.7/km^{2}). There were 68 housing units at an average density of 242.9 per square mile (93.8/km^{2}). The racial makeup of the village was 96.4% White, 0.7% African American, 0.7% Asian, and 2.2% from two or more races. Hispanic or Latino of any race were 0.7% of the population.

There were 61 households, of which 24.6% had children under the age of 18 living with them, 59.0% were married couples living together, 3.3% had a female householder with no husband present, 8.2% had a male householder with no wife present, and 29.5% were non-families. 26.2% of all households were made up of individuals, and 16.4% had someone living alone who was 65 years of age or older. The average household size was 2.28 and the average family size was 2.72.

The median age in the village was 46.5 years. 19.4% of residents were under the age of 18; 3.6% were between the ages of 18 and 24; 26.6% were from 25 to 44; 28.8% were from 45 to 64; and 21.6% were 65 years of age or older. The gender makeup of the village was 46.8% male and 53.2% female.

=== 2000 census ===
As of the census of 2000, there were 119 people, 57 households, and 38 families living in the village. The population density was 430.2 inhabitants per square mile (166.1/km^{2}). There were 66 housing units at an average density of 238.6 per square mile (92.1/km^{2}). The racial makeup of the village was 100.00% White.

There were 57 households, out of which 15.8% had children under the age of 18 living with them, 56.1% were married couples living together, 3.5% had a female householder with no husband present, and 33.3% were non-families. 29.8% of all households were made up of individuals, and 14.0% had someone living alone who was 65 years of age or older. The average household size was 2.09 and the average family size was 2.53.

In the village, the population was spread out, with 11.8% under the age of 18, 11.8% from 18 to 24, 22.7% from 25 to 44, 31.1% from 45 to 64, and 22.7% who were 65 years of age or older. The median age was 48 years. For every 100 females, there were 88.9 males. For every 100 females age 18 and over, there were 94.4 males.

The median income for a household in the village was $29,583, and the median income for a family was $37,083. Males had a median income of $25,417 versus $20,833 for females. The per capita income for the village was $17,046. There were no families and 9.9% of the population living below the poverty line, including no under eighteens and 29.6% of those over 64.

== Education ==
It is in the Knox County R-I School District.
