= Shelby County, Missouri =

County in Missouri, United States

- County
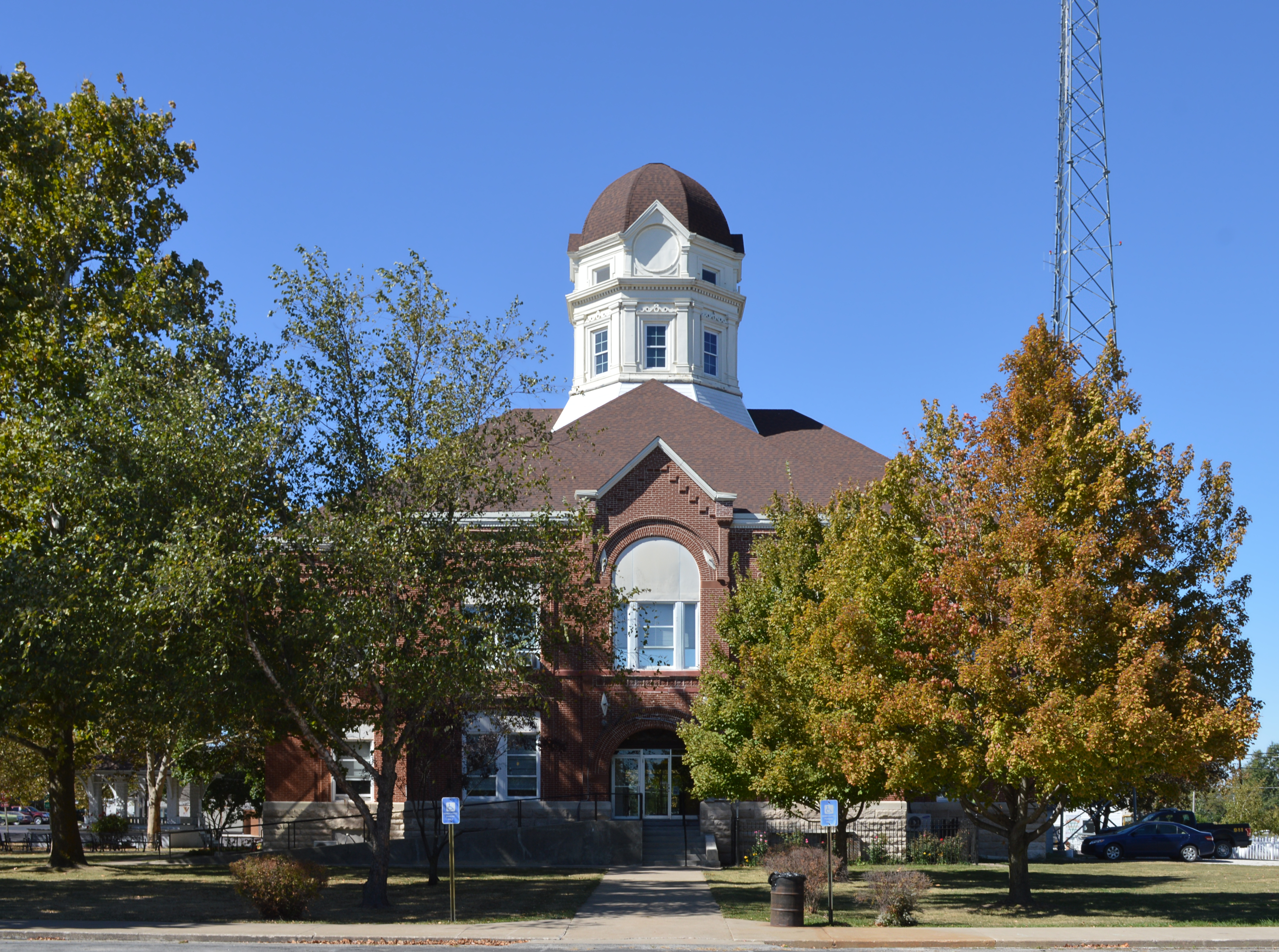
- Shelby County Courthouse in Shelbyville

- Location within the U.S. state of Missouri
- Coordinates: 39°47′N 92°04′W
- Country: United States
- State: Missouri
- Founded: January 2, 1835
- Named for: Isaac Shelby
- Seat: Shelbyville
- Largest city: Shelbina

Area
  - Total: 502 sq mi (1,300 km^{2})
  - Land: 501 sq mi (1,300 km^{2})
  - Water: 1.5 sq mi (3.9 km^{2}) 0.3%

Population (2020)
  - Total: 6,103
  - Estimate (2025): 5,870 ▼
  - Density: 12.2/sq mi (4.70/km^{2})
- Time zone: UTC−6 (Central)
  - Summer (DST): UTC−5 (CDT)
- Congressional district: 6th

Shelby County is a county located in the northeastern portion of the U.S. state of Missouri. As of the 2020 census, the population was 6,103. Its county seat is Shelbyville. The county was established on January 2, 1835, and named for Governor Isaac Shelby of Kentucky.

== Geography ==
According to the U.S. Census Bureau, the county has a total area of 502 square miles (1,300 km^{2}), of which 501 square miles (1,300 km^{2}) is land and 1.5 square miles (3.9 km^{2}) (0.3%) is water.

=== Adjacent counties ===
- Knox County (north)
- Lewis County (northeast)
- Marion County (east)
- Monroe County (south)
- Randolph County (southwest)
- Macon County (west)

=== Major highways ===
- Future I-72 / US 36 / Route 110 (CKC)
  - US 36 Bus. (Clarence)
  - US 36 Bus. (Shelbina)
- Route 15
- Route 151
- Route 168

== Demographics ==
Historical population
Census	Pop.	Note	%±
1840	3,056		—
1850	4,253		39.2%
1860	7,301		71.7%
1870	10,119		38.6%
1880	14,024		38.6%
1890	15,642		11.5%
1900	16,167		3.4%
1910	14,864		−8.1%
1920	13,617		−8.4%
1930	11,983		−12.0%
1940	11,224		−6.3%
1950	9,730		−13.3%
1960	9,063		−6.9%
1970	7,906		−12.8%
1980	7,826		−1.0%
1990	6,942		−11.3%
2000	6,799		−2.1%
2010	6,373		−6.3%
2020	6,103		−4.2%
2025 (est.)	5,870	▼	−3.8%
U.S. Decennial Census; 1790-1960 1900-1990; 1990-2000 2010-2015

=== Racial and ethnic composition ===
Shelby County, Missouri – Racial and ethnic composition Note: the US Census treats Hispanic/Latino as an ethnic category. This table excludes Latinos from the racial categories and assigns them to a separate category. Hispanics/Latinos may be of any race.
Race / Ethnicity (NH = Non-Hispanic)	Pop 1980	Pop 1990	Pop 2000	Pop 2010	Pop 2020	% 1980	% 1990	% 2000	% 2010	% 2020
White alone (NH)	7,721	6,841	6,628	6,202	5,749	98.66%	98.55%	97.48%	97.32%	94.20%
Black or African American alone (NH)	72	55	66	32	20	0.92%	0.79%	0.97%	0.50%	0.33%
Native American or Alaska Native alone (NH)	6	18	18	9	20	0.08%	0.26%	0.26%	0.14%	0.33%
Asian alone (NH)	4	3	7	13	1	0.05%	0.04%	0.10%	0.20%	0.02%
Native Hawaiian or Pacific Islander alone (NH)	x	x	0	0	0	x	x	0.00%	0.00%	0.00%
Other race alone (NH)	0	2	2	0	9	0.00%	0.03%	0.03%	0.00%	0.15%
Mixed race or Multiracial (NH)	x	x	35	46	187	x	x	0.51%	0.72%	3.06%
Hispanic or Latino (any race)	23	23	43	71	117	0.29%	0.33%	0.63%	1.11%	1.92%
Total	7,826	6,942	6,799	6,373	6,103	100.00%	100.00%	100.00%	100.00%	100.00%

=== 2020 census ===
As of the 2020 census, the county had a population of 6,103 and a median age of 42.4 years. 24.4% of residents were under the age of 18, while 22.4% were 65 years of age or older. For every 100 females there were 102.5 males, and for every 100 females age 18 and over there were 97.6 males age 18 and over.

The racial makeup of the county was 94.9% White, 0.4% Black or African American, 0.5% American Indian and Alaska Native, 0.0% Asian, 0.0% Native Hawaiian and Pacific Islander, 0.6% from some other race, and 3.5% from two or more races. Hispanic or Latino residents of any race comprised 1.9% of the population.

0.0% of residents lived in urban areas, while 100.0% lived in rural areas.

There were 2,493 households in the county, of which 29.7% had children under the age of 18 living with them and 22.3% had a female householder with no spouse or partner present. About 30.1% of all households were made up of individuals and 15.1% had someone living alone who was 65 years of age or older.

There were 2,950 housing units, of which 15.5% were vacant. Among occupied housing units, 73.8% were owner-occupied and 26.2% were renter-occupied. The homeowner vacancy rate was 1.5% and the rental vacancy rate was 13.8%.

=== 2000 census ===
As of the census of 2000, there were 6,799 people, 2,745 households, and 1,847 families residing in the county. The population density was 14 people per square mile (5.4 people/km^{2}). There were 3,245 housing units at an average density of 6 units per square mile (2.3/km^{2}). The racial makeup of the county was 97.87% White, 0.97% Black or African American, 0.28% Native American, 0.10% Asian, 0.19% from other races, and 0.59% from two or more races. Approximately 0.63% of the population were Hispanic or Latino of any race. 30.4% were of American, 26.9% German, 14.9% English and 8.5% Irish ancestry.

There were 2,745 households, out of which 30.60% had children under the age of 18 living with them, 56.90% were married couples living together, 7.30% had a female householder with no husband present, and 32.70% were non-families. 30.30% of all households were made up of individuals, and 16.60% had someone living alone who was 65 years of age or older. The average household size was 2.38 and the average family size was 2.98.

In the county, the population was spread out, with 25.40% under the age of 18, 7.20% from 18 to 24, 24.40% from 25 to 44, 23.30% from 45 to 64, and 19.70% who were 65 years of age or older. The median age was 40 years. For every 100 females there were 91.60 males. For every 100 females age 18 and over, there were 90.00 males.

The median income for a household in the county was $29,448, and the median income for a family was $35,944. Males had a median income of $25,759 versus $18,996 for females. The per capita income for the county was $15,632. About 13.00% of families and 16.30% of the population were below the poverty line, including 21.70% of those under age 18 and 14.10% of those age 65 or over.

== Education ==
=== Public schools ===
- North Shelby School District – Shelbyville
  - North Shelby Elementary School (K-06)
  - North Shelby High School (07-12)
- Shelby County R-IV School District – Shelbina
  - South Shelby Elementary School (K-05)
  - South Shelby Middle School (06-08)
  - South Shelby High School (09-12)

=== Private schools ===
- Shiloh Christian School – Shelbina (K-12) – Nondenominational Christian – Alternative School
- Heartland Christian Academy – Bethel (PK-12) – Nondenominational Christian

=== Public libraries ===
- Clarence Public Library
- Shelbina Carnegie Public Library

== Politics ==
=== Local ===
The Democratic Party predominantly controls politics at the local level in Shelby County. Democrats hold all but one of the elected positions in the county.

Shelby County, Missouri

Elected countywide officials
Assessor	Liz Miles	Independent
Circuit Clerk	Rosalie (Rose) Shively	Democratic
County Clerk	Stephanie Bender	Democratic
Collector	John Chinn	Democratic
Commissioner (presiding)	Terry Helmick	Republican
Commissioner (district 1)	Terry Melford	Independent
Commissioner (district 2)	Tom Shively	Independent
Coroner	Ralph Eagan	Democratic
Prosecuting Attorney	Jordan Rogers	Democratic
Public Administrator	Susan C. Wilt	Republican
Recorder	Audrey Grawe Buzzard	Democratic
Sheriff	Aaron Fredrickson	Independent
Surveyor	Martin T. Wasson	Democratic
Treasurer	Tracy Smith	Democratic

=== State ===
Past Gubernatorial Elections Results
Year	Republican	Democratic	Third Parties
2024	82.64% 2,656	15.68% 504	1.68% 54
2020	81.05% 2,698	17.30% 576	1.65% 55
2016	66.12% 2,143	32.00% 1,037	1.88% 61
2012	53.58% 1,721	44.40% 1,426	2.02% 65
2008	63.15% 2,094	35.86% 1,189	0.99% 33
2004	66.72% 2,316	32.15% 1,116	1.13% 39
2000	51.50% 1,668	47.76% 1,547	0.74% 24
1996	28.12% 859	70.51% 2,154	1.37% 42

Shelby County is a part of Missouri's 5th District in the Missouri House of Representatives and is represented by Lindell F Shumake (R-Hannibal).

Missouri House of Representatives — District 5 — Shelby County (2016)
Party	Candidate	Votes	%	±%
Republican	Lindell F. Shumake	2,315	72.94%	+5.03
Democratic	O.C. Latta	859	27.06%	−5.03

Missouri House of Representatives — District 5 — Shelby County (2014)
Party	Candidate	Votes	%	±%
Republican	Lindell F. Shumake	1,149	67.91%	+30.42
Democratic	C. Leroy Deichman	543	32.09%	−30.42

Missouri House of Representatives — District 5 — Shelby County (2012)
Party	Candidate	Votes	%	±%
Republican	Lindell F. Shumake	1,215	37.49%	
Democratic	Tom Shively	2,026	62.51%	

Shelby County is a part of Missouri's 18th District in the Missouri Senate and is currently represented by Brian Munzlinger (R-Williamstown).

Missouri Senate — District 18 — Shelby County (2014)
Party	Candidate	Votes	%	±%
Republican	Brian Munzlinger	1,375	100.00%	

=== Federal ===
U.S. Senate — Missouri — Shelby County (2016)
Party	Candidate	Votes	%	±%
Republican	Roy Blunt	2,129	66.16%	+14.39
Democratic	Jason Kander	989	30.73%	−13.49
Libertarian	Jonathan Dine	54	1.68%	−2.33
Green	Johnathan McFarland	31	0.93%	+0.93
Constitution	Fred Ryman	15	0.47%	+0.47

U.S. Senate — Missouri — Shelby County (2012)
Party	Candidate	Votes	%	±%
Republican	Todd Akin	1,667	51.77%	
Democratic	Claire McCaskill	1,424	44.22%	
Libertarian	Jonathan Dine	129	4.01%	

Shelby County is included in Missouri's 6th Congressional District and is currently represented by Sam Graves (R-Tarkio) in the U.S. House of Representatives.

U.S. House of Representatives — Missouri's 6th Congressional District — Shelby County (2016)
Party	Candidate	Votes	%	±%
Republican	Sam Graves	2,428	77.10%	+5.34
Democratic	David M. Blackwell	649	20.61%	−6.27
Libertarian	Russ Lee Monchil	40	1.27%	−0.09
Green	Mike Diel	32	1.02%	

U.S. House of Representatives — Missouri’s 6th Congressional District — Shelby County (2014)
Party	Candidate	Votes	%	±%
Republican	Sam Graves	1,212	71.76%	+4.76
Democratic	Bill Hedge	454	26.88%	−4.30
Libertarian	Russ Lee Monchil	23	1.36%	−0.46

U.S. House of Representatives — Missouri's 6th Congressional District — Shelby County (2012)
Party	Candidate	Votes	%	±%
Republican	Sam Graves	2,091	67.00%	
Democratic	Kyle Yarber	973	31.18%	
Libertarian	Russ Lee Monchil	57	1.82%	

United States presidential election results for Shelby County, Missouri
Year	Republican		Democratic		Third party(ies)	
Year	No.	%	No.	%	No.	%
1888	1,102	33.24%	2,105	63.50%	108	3.26%
1892	1,128	31.92%	2,252	63.72%	154	4.36%
1896	1,275	30.67%	2,850	68.56%	32	0.77%
1900	1,217	31.46%	2,578	66.65%	73	1.89%
1904	1,257	36.30%	2,124	61.33%	82	2.37%
1908	1,298	33.93%	2,466	64.47%	61	1.59%
1912	859	22.97%	2,450	65.51%	431	11.52%
1916	1,195	31.53%	2,549	67.26%	46	1.21%
1920	2,128	34.69%	3,935	64.15%	71	1.16%
1924	1,737	30.01%	3,957	68.37%	94	1.62%
1928	2,303	42.12%	3,158	57.75%	7	0.13%
1932	1,104	20.66%	4,215	78.87%	25	0.47%
1936	1,697	27.81%	4,367	71.57%	38	0.62%
1940	2,167	34.83%	4,028	64.75%	26	0.42%
1944	1,934	35.90%	3,435	63.76%	18	0.33%
1948	1,348	28.32%	3,400	71.43%	12	0.25%
1952	2,163	39.88%	3,237	59.68%	24	0.44%
1956	1,990	39.53%	3,044	60.47%	0	0.00%
1960	2,062	41.81%	2,870	58.19%	0	0.00%
1964	1,212	27.75%	3,156	72.25%	0	0.00%
1968	1,693	41.33%	2,045	49.93%	358	8.74%
1972	2,057	56.73%	1,569	43.27%	0	0.00%
1976	1,453	39.25%	2,227	60.16%	22	0.59%
1980	2,151	52.73%	1,849	45.33%	79	1.94%
1984	2,243	58.78%	1,573	41.22%	0	0.00%
1988	1,586	46.54%	1,818	53.35%	4	0.12%
1992	1,169	34.44%	1,435	42.28%	790	23.28%
1996	1,213	39.64%	1,410	46.08%	437	14.28%
2000	1,936	59.44%	1,262	38.75%	59	1.81%
2004	2,280	65.11%	1,201	34.29%	21	0.60%
2008	2,166	65.32%	1,114	33.59%	36	1.09%
2012	2,188	67.70%	966	29.89%	78	2.41%
2016	2,524	77.09%	606	18.51%	144	4.40%
2020	2,700	80.60%	592	17.67%	58	1.73%
2024	2,691	82.50%	550	16.86%	21	0.64%

=== Missouri presidential preference primary (2008) ===
Former U.S. Senator Hillary Clinton (D-New York) received more votes, a total of 460, than any candidate from either party in Shelby County during the 2008 presidential primary.

== Communities ==
=== Cities ===
- Clarence
- Hunnewell
- Shelbina
- Shelbyville (county seat)

=== Villages ===
- Bethel
- Leonard

=== Unincorporated communities ===
- Burksville
- Cherry Box
- Elgin
- Emden
- Enterprise
- Epworth
- Hagers Grove
- Kellerville
- Kendall
- Kirby
- Lakeland
- Lakenan
- Lentner
- Maud
- Oakdale
- Sigsbee
- Walkersville

== Notable people ==
- Edward McKendree Bounds – clergyman and author
- Norm Stewart, legendary University of Missouri basketball coach (from Shelbyville)
- Randall Duke Cunningham, only U.S. Navy fighter ace of the Vietnam War, former Republican U.S. Representative from California (raised in Shelbina)
- Frank Hamilton Short, conservationist and advocate for states' rights and private development of natural resources in the early 20th century (born in Shelby County in 1862)
- Sam Walton, founder of Wal-Mart

== See also ==
- National Register of Historic Places listings in Shelby County, Missouri
