= National Register of Historic Places listings in Macon County, Missouri =

Location of Macon County in Missouri

This is a list of the National Register of Historic Places listings in Macon County, Missouri.

This is intended to be a complete list of the properties and districts on the National Register of Historic Places in Macon County, Missouri, United States. Latitude and longitude coordinates are provided for many National Register properties and districts; these locations may be seen together in a map.

There are nine properties and districts listed on the National Register in the county.

This National Park Service list is complete through NPS recent listings posted May 23, 2025.

== Current listings ==
	Name on the Register	Image	Date listed	Location	City or town	Description
1	Blees Military Academy	Blees Military Academy	October 11, 1979 (#79001380)	U.S. Route 63; 39°43′14″N 92°28′00″W	Macon	
2	Lester and Norma Dent House	Lester and Norma Dent House	May 18, 1990 (#90000763)	225 N. Church St. 40°01′31″N 92°29′41″W	La Plata	
3	John T. and Mary M. Doneghy House	John T. and Mary M. Doneghy House	March 22, 1990 (#90000488)	301 N. Owensby St. 40°01′33″N 92°29′35″W	La Plata	
4	Gardner and Tinsley Filling Station	Gardner and Tinsley Filling Station	April 25, 2002 (#02000408)	Old U.S. Route 36 1.5 miles east of its junction with Route 149; 39°45′35″N 92°43′13″W	New Cambria	Building relocated to Macon
5	Gilbreath-McLorn House	Gilbreath-McLorn House	November 16, 1978 (#78001667)	225 N. Owenby; 40°01′31″N 92°29′36″W	La Plata	
6	La Plata Square Historic District	La Plata Square Historic District	November 20, 2008 (#08000696)	Along portions of Gex, Sanders, and Moore St. 40°01′23″N 92°29′28″W	La Plata	
7	Macon County Courthouse and Annex	Macon County Courthouse and Annex	December 8, 1978 (#78001668)	Courthouse Sq. 39°44′32″N 92°28′22″W	Macon	
8	Johnson Morrow House		July 7, 1994 (#94000703)	2nd St. west of its junction with Pine St. 39°45′44″N 92°37′33″W	Callao	
9	Wardell House	Wardell House	March 12, 1986 (#86000333)	1 Wardell Rd. 39°44′32″N 92°28′37″W	Macon	

== See also ==
- List of National Historic Landmarks in Missouri
- National Register of Historic Places listings in Missouri
