= Prewitt Roberts =

American football player and coach (1888–1964)

Biographical details
- Born: April 27, 1888; Long Lane, Missouri, U.S.
- Died: December 13, 1964 (aged 76); San Francisco, California, U.S.

Playing career
- 1905–1907: Missouri

Coaching career (HC unless noted)
- 1911: Blees Military Academy (MO)
- 1912: William Jewell
- 1916–1917: Sewanee Academy (TN)

Head coaching record
- Overall: 5–3 (college)

Prewitt Ulrich Roberts (April 27, 1888 – December 13, 1964) was an American college football player and coach. Roberts served as the head football coach at William Jewell College in Liberty, Missouri in 1912, compiling a record of 5–3.

== Head coaching record ==
=== College ===
Year	Team	Overall	Conference	Standing	Bowl/playoffs
William Jewell Baptists (Missouri Intercollegiate Athletic Association) (1912)
1912	William Jewell	5–3			
William Jewell:		5–3			
Total:		5–3			
