= Barney Pelty =

American baseball player (1880-1939)

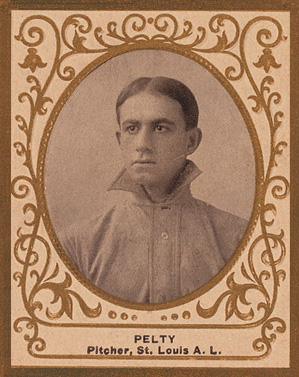
- Starting pitcher
- Born: September 10, 1880; Farmington, Missouri, U.S.
- Died: May 24, 1939 (aged 58); Farmington, Missouri, U.S.
- Batted: Right Threw: Right

MLB debut
- August 20, 1903, for the St. Louis Browns

Last MLB appearance
- August 10, 1912, for the Washington Senators

MLB statistics
- Win–loss record: 92–117
- Earned run average: 2.63
- Strikeouts: 693
- Stats at Baseball Reference

Teams
- St. Louis Browns (1903–1912); Washington Senators (1912)

Barney Pelty (September 10, 1880 – May 24, 1939) was an American Major League Baseball pitcher known as "the Yiddish Curver" because he was one of the first Jewish baseball players in the American League. As of 2017 he is in the top 10 for his career of all pitchers in the St. Louis Browns/Baltimore Orioles franchise in batters hit by pitch (first), complete games (third), ERA (sixth), and innings pitched and shutouts (eighth).

== Early life ==
Pelty was born in Farmington, Missouri, where his family was the only Jewish family at the time. His parents were Samuel (who immigrated to the U.S. from Prussia at the age of 17) and Helena Pelty, who were both Jewish. He was the youngest of six children. His father was a cigar maker and opened a cigar store.

== College ==
Pelty was offered free tuition at Carleton College (now defunct) in Farmington, Missouri, to pitch for them. While attending Carleton, he met Eva Warsing, whom he married. After two years at Carleton, Pelty transferred to Blees Military Academy in Macon, Missouri, and pitched for the Academy team in the 1899 and 1900 spring seasons.

== Minor league career ==
Pelty began his professional career with the 1902 Nashville Volunteers, but an arm injury cut his season short. After playing semi-pro ball, he was signed by the Cedar Rapids Rabbits of the Illinois-Indiana-Iowa League for 1903, and pitched in 25 games for them.

== Major league career ==
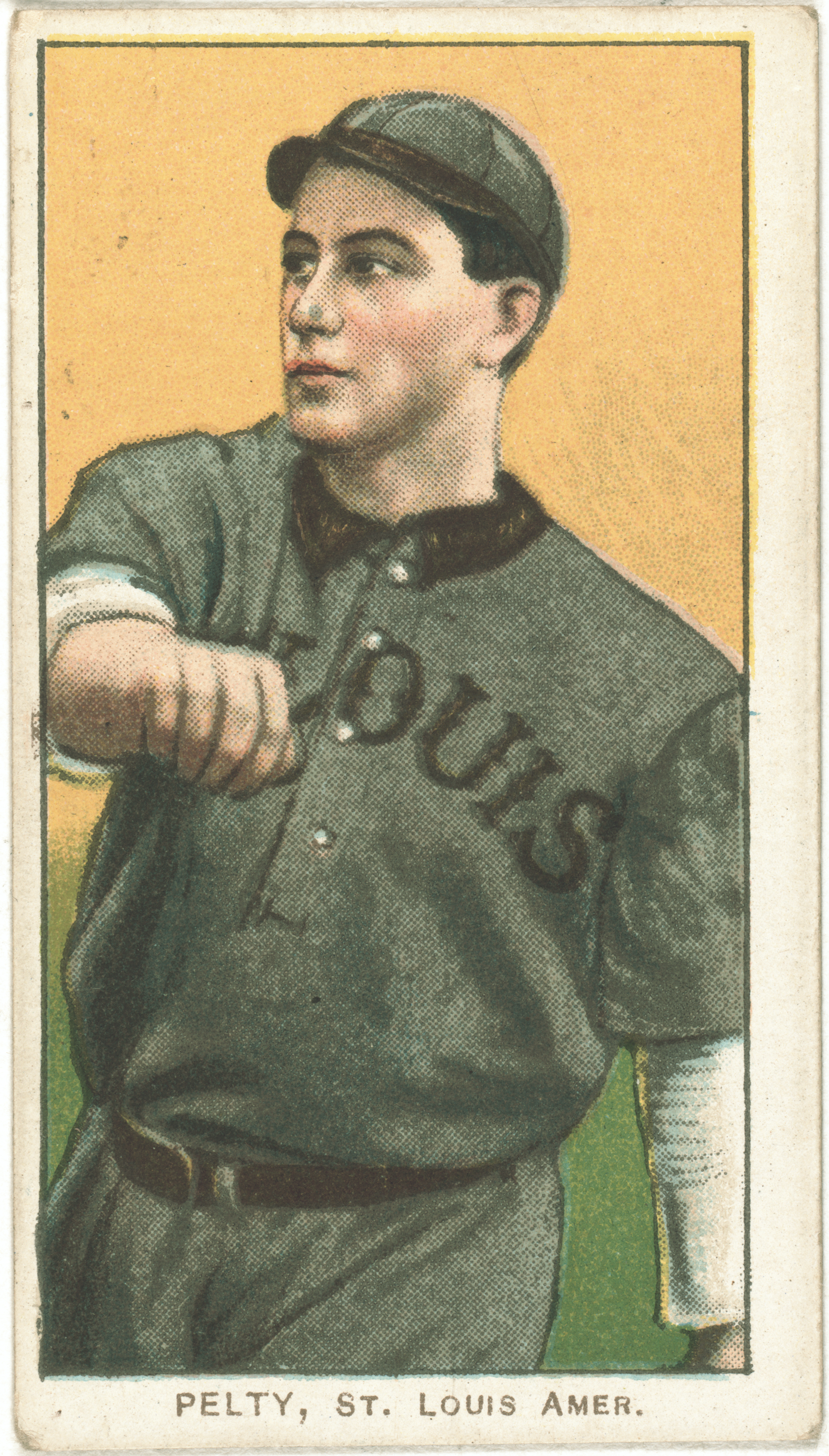
Pelty in 1909

The Boston Red Sox and the St. Louis Browns got into a bidding war for him in 1903, and the Browns won with an offer of $850 ($30,000 today). He was 22 years old when he made his Major League debut that year. He became a coach when not pitching.

Pelty was a workhorse for the Browns, a member of their starting rotation from 1904, when he pitched 31 complete games and 301 innings, through 1911. In 1904, he led the league in hit batsmen (20; a franchise record that still stands), and was 6th in wild pitches (9), while pitching 31 complete games (tied for 6th-most in franchise history). In 1905 he was 14–14 with a 2.75 ERA, while the team's other pitchers were a combined 40–85.

In 1906, his peak year, Pelty went 16–11 with a 1.59 ERA (2nd in the AL). He also led the league in fewest hits allowed per nine innings pitched (6.53) and lowest batting average against (.206), and was second in hit batsmen (19). He especially was dominant against the World Series champion 1906 White Sox, allowing one run in 32 innings. In one three-game series against Chicago, Pelty pitched every game, including a scoreless tie in 10 innings. His 1.59 ERA in 1906 is the lowest single-season ERA in the history of the Browns/Baltimore Orioles franchise, and his WHIP of 0.951 is the second-lowest (behind Dave McNally's 0.852 in 1968).

In 1907, he lost a league-high 21 games and hit a league-high 19 batters, while pitching five shutouts (sixth-best in the league) and 29 complete games (also sixth-best). In 1908, the right-hander improved to 7–4, 1.99 ERA in a reduced role. In 1909, Pelty pitched five shutouts, 5th-best in the AL. He also was 10th-best in the league in fewest H/9 (7.13).

On June 11, 1912, he was purchased for $2,500 ($83,000 today) by the Washington Senators from the St. Louis Browns. Pelty finished his career with the Senators that year. He gave up 22 home runs in 1,908 innings in his career. Pelty did not mind pitching inside, leading the league in hit batsmen in 1904 and 1907. While he gave up only 558 earned runs lifetime, errors by his teammates (and by him—he had 12 in 1906) let in nearly another 200 unearned runs lifetime. Pelty pitched 22 career shutouts, but was shut out 32 times, including nine 1–0 defeats due to poor offensive support.

Pelty's career ERA is 2.63, 64th-best through 2017 of all pitchers in major league baseball. Through 2017 he ranked 82nd in hits per 9 innings, and 78th in batters hit by pitch. He was as of 2017 in the top-10 for his career of all pitchers in the St. Louis Browns/Baltimore Orioles franchise in hit by pitch (1st), complete games (3rd), ERA (6th), and innings pitched and shutouts (8th).

In his career, through 2010, Pelty was one of the all-time best Jewish pitchers in major league history, ranking first in career ERA (ahead of #2 Sandy Koufax), sixth in wins (92; directly behind Jason Marquis), and seventh in strikeouts (693; directly behind Barry Latman).

== Later years ==
In 2010, the Farmington City Council voted to name an access road leading to a sports complex, "Barney Pelty Drive" in his honor. In 2016, he was inducted into the first class of the Farmington Hall of Fame. Pelty and his wife had a son, who became the city engineer of Farmington. Barney Pelty died in Farmington on May 24, 1939.

== Miscellaneous ==
- It was often erroneously reported that he had changed his name from Peltheimer.
- Pelty was proud of his Jewish heritage, as indicated by his nickname, and did not change his name or hide his identity like some other Jewish players of the era.
- During his career, Pelty ran a bookstore in his Farmington hometown in the off-seasons. He worked as an inspector for the Missouri State Pure Food and Drug Department, and was an alderman for several terms in Farmington.
- Pelty's last game was in an exhibition in 1937 pitching against Grover Cleveland Alexander, dropping the decision.
- He coached the Farmington High School baseball team from at least 1906.

== See also ==
- List of Major League Baseball career hit batsmen leaders
- List of Jewish Major League Baseball players

== Sources ==
- Horvitz, Peter S. (2001). The Big Book of Jewish Baseball. S P Books. pp. 130–132. ISBN 9781561719730.
- "Pelty, Barney: "The Yiddish Curver"". Jews in Sports.
