= Bamman =

Bamman is a surname. Notable people with the surname include:

- Gerry Bamman (born 1941), American actor and playwright
- Henry A. Bamman (1918–2000), American author and academic
