= 1919 lynching in Moberly, Missouri =

Lynching in Moberly, Missouri
- Part of Red Summer
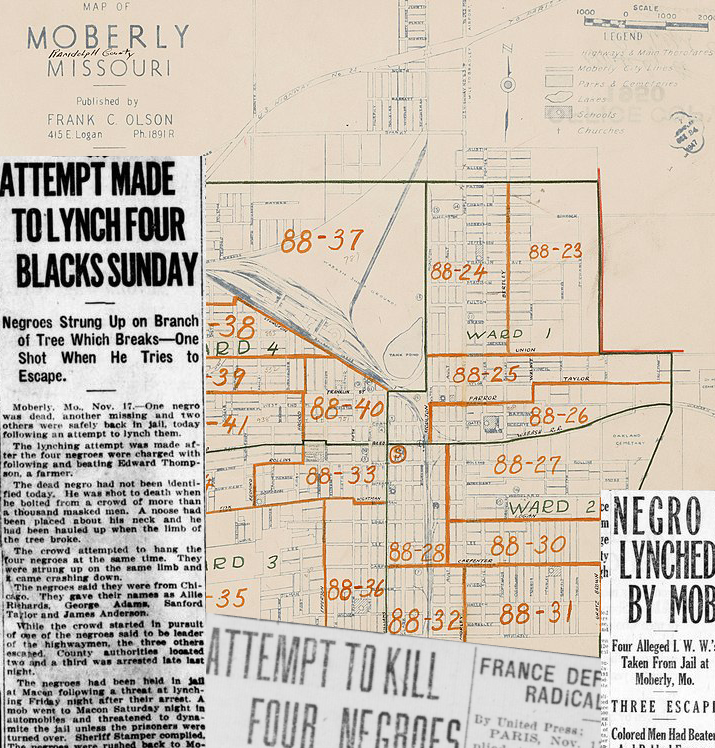
- Date: Sunday, November 16, 1919
- Location: Moberly, Missouri; 39°25′06″N 92°26′18″W
- Participants: White mob in Moberly, Missouri
- Deaths: 1

On Sunday, November 16, 1919, four African-Americans were lynched in Moberly, Missouri. Three were able to escape but one was shot to death.

== Background ==
The East St. Louis massacres were a series of outbreaks of labor and race-related violence by people that caused the deaths of an estimated 40–250 African Americans in late May and early July 1917. Another 6,000 blacks were left homeless, and the rioting and vandalism cost approximately $400,000 ($10,052,000 in 2025) in property damage.

These race riots were one of several incidents of civil unrest that started again in the so-called American Red Summer of 1919. In most cases, white mobs attacked African American neighborhoods. In some cases, black community groups resisted the attacks, especially in Chicago and Washington DC. Most deaths occurred in rural areas during events like the Elaine massacre in Arkansas, where an estimated 100 to 240 black people and 5 white people were killed. Also in 1919 were the Chicago Race Riot and Washington D.C. race riot which killed 38 and 39 people respectively. Both had many more non-fatal injuries and extensive property damage reaching into the millions of dollars.

In addition to this racial tension, the United States' media were alarmed by terrorist attacks from radical left extremist groups. On November 16, 1919 A. Mitchell Palmer released a report about the dangers of the far left and that “The negro race,” he warns, was “fertile ground” for the spread of radical propaganda. He launched a campaign against radicalism known as the Palmer Raids in November 1919. Federal agents supported by local police rounded up large groups of suspected radicals, often based on membership in a political group rather than any action taken.

== Lynching ==
In November 1919 in Moberly, Missouri four African Americans beat and robbed white farmer Edward Thompson, The Dallas Express reported that Thompson had only light injuries.

Four African Americans, identified (Note: The Dallas Express gave their names as Halley Richardson, 18 years old, 101 West Thirty-first street, Chicago; Sanford Taylor, 20 years of ago, 113 Baker street, East St. Louis; George Adams, 18. 2938 Federal street, Chicago; James Anderson, 3122 Federal street, Chicago.) as Allie Richards, George Adams, Sanfard Taylor, and James Anderson, were arrested on Thursday, November 14, 1919, and held in the nearby Macon, Missouri. It was reported in the press that the four were Industrial Workers of the World (I.W.W.) members and it was claimed that they were from Chicago.

A mob of seventy five to eighty masked men, allegedly neighboring farmers, threatened to bomb the Macon jail unless the four were handed over. Macon County Sheriff Jesse Stamper folded and instructed his deputy, Bob Epperson to give the mob the keys. The accused African-Americans were taken back to the outskirts of Moberly and in front of a crowd of about a hundred men, an attempt was made to hang all four on the same branch. Unable to handle the combined weight the branch broke. The failed hanging attempt allowed the accused to flee but armed men were able to shoot one down and the three remaining were able to escape in the chaos.

County authorities quickly rearrested two and a third was arrested late Sunday, November 16, 1919.

== See also ==
- Elaine massacre (September 30–October 1, 1919) in rural Phillips County, Arkansas
- Frank Livingston was lynched in El Dorado, Arkansas on May 21, 1919, by white mob

== Bibliography ==
Notes

References

- "Four Negroes Accused of Robbery Removed From Jail". The Dallas Express. Dallas, Dallas, Houston, Harris, Texas: W.E. King. November 29, 1919. pp. 1–14. ISSN 2331-334X. OCLC 9839625.
- "Attempt Made To Lynch Four Blacks Sunday". Evening Capital News. Boise, Ada, Idaho: Capital News Pub. Co. November 17, 1919. pp. 1–10. ISSN 2471-7754. OCLC 18530685.
- "Seeks Rigid Laws To Handle 60,000 Radicals In U.S." Evening Star. Washington, District of Columbia: W.D. Wallach & Hope. November 16, 1919. pp. 1–94. ISSN 2331-9968. OCLC 2260929.
- The New York Times (October 5, 1919). "For Action on Race Riot Peril". The New York Times. New York, NY. ISSN 1553-8095. OCLC 1645522.
- "Four Alleged I.W.W.'s Taken From Jail at Moberly, Mo". The Ogden Standard. Ogden, Weber, Utah: W. Glasmann. November 17, 1919. pp. 1–12. ISSN 2163-4793. OCLC 12982876.
- "Attempt To Kill Four Negroes". South Bend News-Times. South Bend, Saint Joseph, Indiana: News-Times Print. Co. 1919. pp. 1–16. ISSN 2377-7095. OCLC 15568606.
