= Henry A. Bamman =

- Born: June 13, 1918; Macon, Missouri, U.S.
- Died: February 14, 2000 (aged 81); Rocklin, California, U.S.
- Occupation: Author, Professor, Teacher
- Genre: Adventure, Science fiction
- Spouse: Ruth G. Wiren (1948-2000, his death)
- Children: 2

Henry A. Bamman (June 13, 1918-February 14, 2000) was an American author, professor and teacher. His titles focuses were adventure and science fiction. He had co-authored many books with Helen Huus and Robert J Whitehead.

== Early life and career ==
Henry A. Bamman was born in Macon, Missouri. He had interest in writing adventure and science fiction books. His first occupation was a teacher in Macon County, Missouri, public school district. Then he became a professor at University of Colorado Denver as an instructor in English. He also became an assistant professor in English at Eastern Washington College of Education. Bamman was assistant director of counseling center at Stanford University. Bamman later became a professor of education in Sacramento State College located in Sacramento, California. He left education professor because he was serving as a project planning director for Field Educational Publications, Inc. In 1978, he was invited to speak at Truman State University as a Baldwin Lecturer. He spoke on "Crisis and change".

== Bibliography ==
=== 1982 ===
- Amazing
- Daredevils and dreamers
- Extraordinary episodes
- Fantastic flights
- Challenges

=== Top Flight Readers (1977) ===
- Bush Pilot
- Chopper
- Test Pilot
- Hang Glider
- Barnstormers
- Balloon
- The top flight readers : teacher's manual

=== Space Science Fiction Series (1970) ===
- Space Pirate
- Milky Way
- Bone people (ISBN 0817525033)
- Planet of the Whistlers
- Ice men of Rime
- Inviso man

=== Mystery Adventure Series (1969) ===
- Mystery adventure of the jeweled bell
- Mystery adventure at Longcliff Inn
- Mystery adventure of the Indian burial ground
- Mystery adventure of the smuggled treasures
- Mystery adventure of the talking statues
- Mystery Adventure at Cave Four

=== The Checkered flag series ===
- Wheels (1967)
- Riddler (1967)
- Bearcat (1967)
- Smashup (1967)
- Scramble (1969)
- Flea (1969)
- Grand Prix (1969)
- Five Hundred (500) (1968)
- A teacher's manual for the checkered flag series (1968, 1972)

=== World of Adventure Series ===
- The Lost Uranium Mine (1964)
- Flight to the South Pole (1965)
- Hunting Grizzly Bears (1963)
- Fire on the Mountain (1963)
- City Beneath the Sea (1964)
- The Search for Piranha (1964)
- Sacred Well of Sacrifice (1964)
- Viking Treasure (1965)
- Teacher's Guide: World of Adventure Series (1965)

== Personal life ==
Bamman married Ruth G. Wiren on June 12, 1948, just one day before his birthday. He has two children, a son whose name is Richard and a daughter whose name is Elin Kristina.

=== Death ===
He died on February 14, 2000, in Rocklin, California, at the age of 81. He is survived by his wife Ruth G. Wiren and his son and daughter.
