= La Plata, Missouri =

City in Missouri, United States

- City
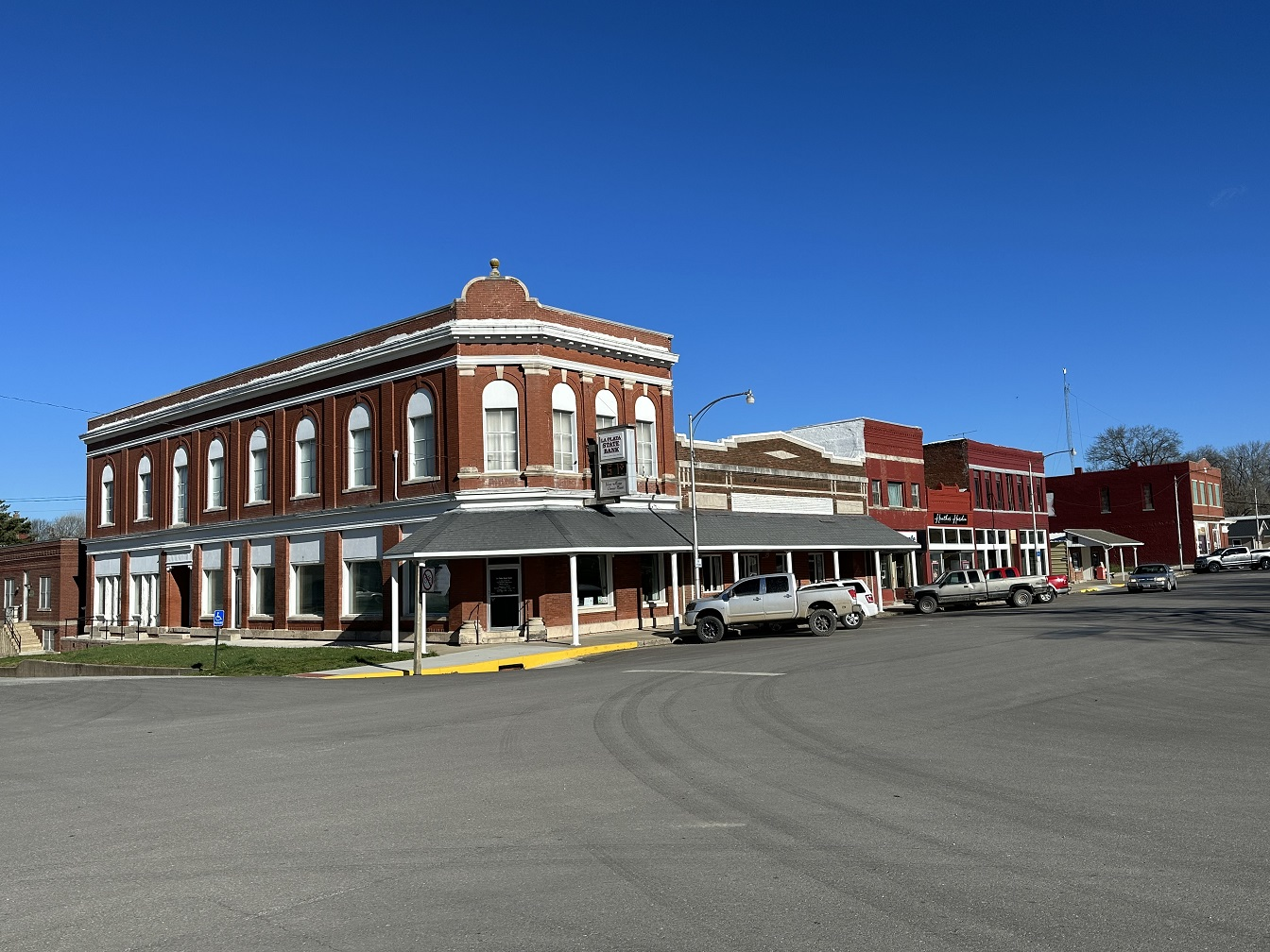
- Downtown La Plata

- Location within Macon County and Missouri
- Coordinates: 40°01′27″N 92°29′29″W
- Country: United States
- State: Missouri
- County: Macon

Area
  - Total: 1.59 sq mi (4.13 km^{2})
  - Land: 1.59 sq mi (4.11 km^{2})
  - Water: 0.0077 sq mi (0.02 km^{2})
- Elevation: 938 ft (286 m)

Population (2020)
  - Total: 1,257
  - Density: 791.3/sq mi (305.53/km^{2})
- Time zone: UTC-6 (Central (CST))
  - Summer (DST): UTC-5 (CDT)
- ZIP code: 63549
- Area code: 660
- FIPS code: 29-40682
- GNIS feature ID: 2395569
- Website: www.cityoflaplata.net

La Plata (/lɑː ˈpleɪtə/ lah PLAY-tə) is a city in Macon County, Missouri, United States. The population was 1,257 at the 2020 census, down from 1,366 in 2010. La Plata is located next to the Adair County line and is on a mainline of the BNSF Railway. The town is best known for La Plata station, which provides passenger rail service to Chicago and Los Angeles.

== History ==
The beginnings of La Plata can be traced back to March 17, 1827, when Drury Davis established a trading post near the town's current location. The ensuing few years saw Davis joined by family and friends to create a small village that included a blacksmith shop, an inn, and stagecoach station.

La Plata was platted in 1855. It was named after the city of La Plata, in Argentina. The name is of Spanish origin meaning "silver". Two men, Louis Gex and Thomas Saunders, were the primary force behind the town's platting, and drew straws to choose the community's name. Saunders wanted to name the town "Charlottesville" to honor a favorite sister, while Gex pushed for the name La Plata. Gex won out, and the town is believed to have been first incorporated on September 29, 1856. Another of the early settlers who helped in creating the town was W. W. Moore, who erected La Plata's first hotel.

The North Missouri (later known as the Wabash Railroad) came to town in 1867, and the Santa Fe Railroad twenty years later, passing through La Plata on its route from Chicago to Kansas City. The combination of the two railroads made La Plata an ideal shipping point for timber, livestock, grains, and other goods for northern Macon County and southern portions of neighboring Adair County as well. As part of this growth, the town was incorporated as a fourth-class city on April 4, 1881, with Jacob Gilstrap serving as first mayor. La Plata's first major industry, a creamery, was established in 1883. The facility had the capacity to produce up to 1.25 tons of butter per day. However, fire destroyed the creamery and it was never rebuilt. Other light agriculture-related industry has existed in the town over the years, including a large chicken hatchery and turkey hatchery. Two major oil pipelines pass through La Plata as well, the Prairie Pipeline being the first in 1912. A "tank farm" of large storage tanks was located for many years on the city's northern edge. The Wabash Railroad through La Plata was abandoned after it was merged in 1991 with the Norfolk and Western Railway, but the Amtrak station is still in operation on the Burlington Northern Santa Fe rail system, and the town is served by the Southwest Chief. A small but active business community still exists in the town.

The first school, named "Long Branch" for a nearby creek, was established in 1868. It was replaced, in 1872, by a five-room brick schoolhouse. Today, children of La Plata and the surrounding rural area are educated by the La Plata R-2 school district.

The Lester and Norma Dent House, John T. and Mary M. Doneghy House, Gilbreath-McLorn House, and La Plata Square Historic District are listed on the National Register of Historic Places.

== Geography ==
La Plata is in northeastern Macon County, with its northern border following the county line. U.S. Route 63, a four-lane highway, passes through the east side of the city, leading south 20 miles (32 km) to Macon, the county seat, and north 13 miles (21 km) to Kirksville in Adair County. Missouri Route 156 passes through the south side of La Plata as Clark Street, leading west 10 miles (16 km) to South Gifford and east 15 miles (24 km) to Novelty.

According to the U.S. Census Bureau, La Plata has a total area of 1.59 square miles (4.12 km^{2}), of which 0.006 square miles (3.8 acres), or 0.38%, are water. The city sits on a height of land which drains west to Long Branch, a south-flowing tributary of the Little Chariton River and part of the Missouri River watershed, and east toward the Middle Fork of the Salt River, a direct tributary of the Mississippi.

== Demographics ==
Historical population
| Census | Pop. | Note | %± |
|---|---|---|---|
| 1870 | 546 | | — |
| 1880 | 529 | | −3.1% |
| 1890 | 1,169 | | 121.0% |
| 1900 | 1,345 | | 15.1% |
| 1910 | 1,605 | | 19.3% |
| 1920 | 1,463 | | −8.8% |
| 1930 | 1,406 | | −3.9% |
| 1940 | 1,421 | | 1.1% |
| 1950 | 1,331 | | −6.3% |
| 1960 | 1,365 | | 2.6% |
| 1970 | 1,377 | | 0.9% |
| 1980 | 1,423 | | 3.3% |
| 1990 | 1,401 | | −1.5% |
| 2000 | 1,486 | | 6.1% |
| 2010 | 1,366 | | −8.1% |
| 2020 | 1,257 | | −8.0% |
U.S. Decennial Census

=== 2010 census ===
As of the census of 2010, there were 1,366 people, 584 households, and 364 families residing in the city. The population density was 859.1 inhabitants per square mile (331.7/km^{2}). There were 683 housing units at an average density of 429.6 per square mile (165.9/km^{2}). The racial makeup of the city was 96.5% White, 0.2% African American, 0.1% Asian, 0.5% Pacific Islander, 1.0% from other races, and 1.7% from two or more races. Hispanic or Latino of any race were 1.3% of the population.

There were 584 households, of which 28.8% had children under the age of 18 living with them, 45.2% were married couples living together, 12.5% had a female householder with no husband present, 4.6% had a male householder with no wife present, and 37.7% were non-families. 33.4% of all households were made up of individuals, and 18.5% had someone living alone who was 65 years of age or older. The average household size was 2.26 and the average family size was 2.83.

The median age in the city was 42.1 years. 23.4% of residents were under the age of 18; 8.3% were between the ages of 18 and 24; 21.9% were from 25 to 44; 24.2% were from 45 to 64; and 22.4% were 65 years of age or older. The gender makeup of the city was 47.1% male and 52.9% female. La Plata has a growing settlement of Amish, most of whom are engaged in farming.

=== 2000 census ===
As of the census of 2000, there were 1,486 people, 630 households, and 388 families residing in the city. The population density was 1,219.0 inhabitants per square mile (470.7/km^{2}). There were 702 housing units at an average density of 575.9 per square mile (222.4/km^{2}). The racial makeup of the city was 98.65% White, 0.13% African American, 0.07% Native American, 0.13% Asian, 0.27% from other races, and 0.74% from two or more races. Hispanic or Latino of any race were 1.68% of the population.

There were 630 households, out of which 28.6% had children under the age of 18 living with them, 48.6% were married couples living together, 10.3% had a female householder with no husband present, and 38.3% were non-families. 35.4% of all households were made up of individuals, and 24.0% had someone living alone who was 65 years of age or older. The average household size was 2.28 and the average family size was 2.96.

In the city the population was spread out, with 25.2% under the age of 18, 7.3% from 18 to 24, 23.8% from 25 to 44, 17.8% from 45 to 64, and 26.0% who were 65 years of age or older. The median age was 40 years. For every 100 females there were 79.7 males. For every 100 females age 18 and over, there were 74.4 males.

The median income for a household in the city was $29,583, and the median income for a family was $36,071. Males had a median income of $26,438 versus $17,880 for females. The per capita income for the city was $19,675. About 9.0% of families and 14.1% of the population were below the poverty line, including 21.8% of those under age 18 and 9.7% of those age 65 or over.

== Education ==
Public education in La Plata is administered by La Plata R-II School District, which operates one elementary school and La Plata High School.

La Plata has a lending library, the La Plata Public Library.

== Notable people ==
- Lester Dent, author, Doc Savage books

== See also ==
- List of cities in Missouri
