= Callao, Missouri =

- City
- Location in Macon County and the state of Missouri
- Coordinates: 39°45′44″N 92°37′25″W
- Country: United States
- State: Missouri
- County: Macon

Area
  - Total: 0.52 sq mi (1.34 km^{2})
  - Land: 0.52 sq mi (1.34 km^{2})
  - Water: 0 sq mi (0.00 km^{2})
- Elevation: 837 ft (255 m)

Population (2020)
  - Total: 251
  - Density: 485.7/sq mi (187.54/km^{2})
- Time zone: UTC-6 (Central (CST))
  - Summer (DST): UTC-5 (CDT)
- ZIP code: 63534
- Area code: 660
- FIPS code: 29-10486
- GNIS feature ID: 2393496

Callao (/kæˈlaɪoʊ/ kal-EYE-oh) is a city in Macon County, Missouri, United States. The population was 251 at the 2020 census, down from 292 in 2010.

== History ==
Callao was laid out in 1858, a year before the railroad was extended to that point. The town most likely took its name from the port city of Callao, Peru. Townsfolk did not know what to call the new town. They hung a map of the world on the wall, blindfolded a man like Pin the Tail on the Donkey, aimed him at the map and his finger landed on Callao, Peru. A post office called Callao has been in operation since 1859.

The Johnson Morrow House was listed on the National Register of Historic Places in 1994.

== Geography ==
Callao is in southwestern Macon County. U.S. Route 36 passes just south of the city limits, leading east 8 miles (13 km) to Macon, the county seat, and west 25 miles (40 km) to Brookfield. Missouri Route 3 passes through the center of Callao as Chestnut Street, leading north 33 miles (53 km) to Kirksville and south 24 miles (39 km) to Clifton Hill.

According to the U.S. Census Bureau, Callao has a total area of 0.52 square miles (1.35 km^{2}), all land. The city drains east to the Middle Fork of the Little Chariton River and to the west to Stinking Creek, a tributary of the Middle Fork. Via the Little Chariton River, Callao is within the watershed of the Missouri River.

== Demographics ==
Historical population
| Census | Pop. | Note | %± |
|---|---|---|---|
| 1870 | 310 | | — |
| 1880 | 330 | | 6.5% |
| 1890 | 371 | | 12.4% |
| 1900 | 498 | | 34.2% |
| 1910 | 526 | | 5.6% |
| 1920 | 542 | | 3.0% |
| 1930 | 468 | | −13.7% |
| 1940 | 398 | | −15.0% |
| 1950 | 370 | | −7.0% |
| 1960 | 329 | | −11.1% |
| 1970 | 373 | | 13.4% |
| 1980 | 326 | | −12.6% |
| 1990 | 332 | | 1.8% |
| 2000 | 291 | | −12.3% |
| 2010 | 292 | | 0.3% |
| 2020 | 251 | | −14.0% |
U.S. Decennial Census

=== 2010 census ===
As of the census of 2010, there were 292 people, 112 households, and 81 families living in the city. The population density was 572.5 inhabitants per square mile (221.0/km^{2}). There were 144 housing units at an average density of 282.4 per square mile (109.0/km^{2}). The racial makeup of the city was 96.2% White, 1.0% African American, 0.3% Native American, and 2.4% from two or more races. Hispanic or Latino of any race were 1.4% of the population.

There were 112 households, of which 32.1% had children under the age of 18 living with them, 46.4% were married couples living together, 11.6% had a female householder with no husband present, 14.3% had a male householder with no wife present, and 27.7% were non-families. 23.2% of all households were made up of individuals, and 5.4% had someone living alone who was 65 years of age or older. The average household size was 2.61 and the average family size was 2.96.

The median age in the city was 39.8 years. 26.7% of residents were under the age of 18; 7.5% were between the ages of 18 and 24; 20.9% were from 25 to 44; 33.2% were from 45 to 64; and 11.6% were 65 years of age or older. The gender makeup of the city was 50.3% male and 49.7% female.

=== 2000 census ===
As of the census of 2000, there were 291 people, 117 households, and 78 families living in the city. The population density was 580.0 inhabitants per square mile (223.9/km^{2}). There were 152 housing units at an average density of 303.0 per square mile (117.0/km^{2}). The racial makeup of the city was 99.31% White, 0.34% Native American, and 0.34% from two or more races.

There were 117 households, out of which 24.8% had children under the age of 18 living with them, 55.6% were married couples living together, 7.7% had a female householder with no husband present, and 32.5% were non-families. 24.8% of all households were made up of individuals, and 12.8% had someone living alone who was 65 years of age or older. The average household size was 2.49 and the average family size was 2.95.

In the city the population was spread out, with 23.7% under the age of 18, 8.9% from 18 to 24, 24.7% from 25 to 44, 23.4% from 45 to 64, and 19.2% who were 65 years of age or older. The median age was 40 years. For every 100 females there were 99.3 males. For every 100 females age 18 and over, there were 88.1 males.

The median income for a household in the city was $24,659, and the median income for a family was $32,813. Males had a median income of $22,500 versus $15,125 for females. The per capita income for the city was $12,573. About 18.7% of families and 26.1% of the population were below the poverty line, including 65.3% of those under the age of eighteen and 9.6% of those 65 or over.
