= Frederick W. V. Blees =

German philanthropist (1860–1906)

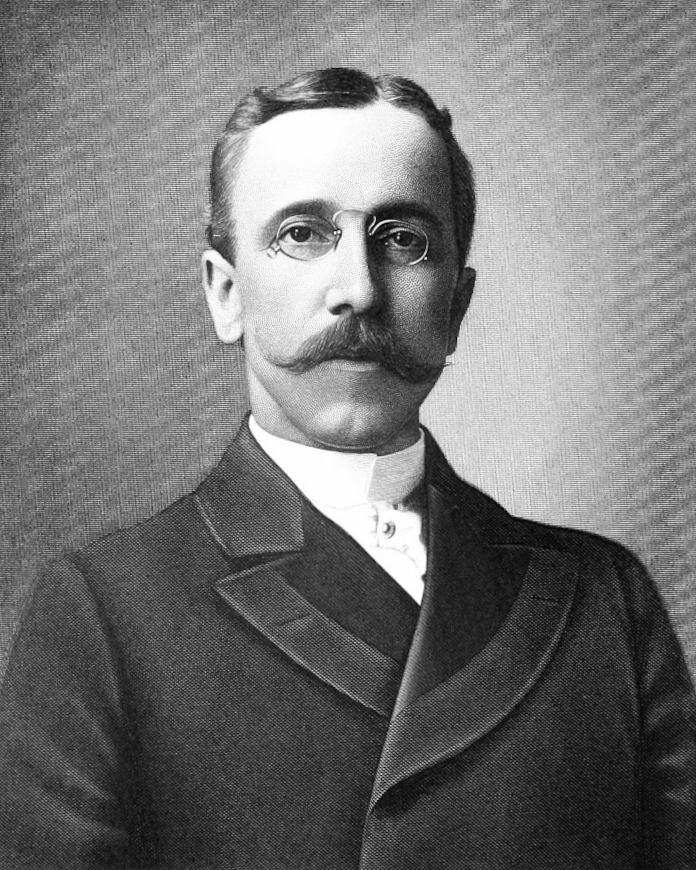
- Born: Frederick Wilhelm Victor Blees; March 30, 1860; Aachen, Kingdom of Prussia
- Died: September 8, 1906 (aged 46); St. Louis, Missouri, United States
- Education: University of Heidelberg; University of Würzburg
- Occupation(s): Military officer, philanthropist, educator
- Spouse: Mary V. Staples (m. 1886)
- Children: 5

Colonel Frederick Wilhelm Victor Blees (March 30, 1860 – September 8, 1906) was a German immigrant to the United States who became a philanthropist, teacher, founder of Blees Military Academy, and the acknowledged chief benefactor of the city of Macon, Missouri.

== Biography ==
Blees was born on March 30, 1860, in Aachen, Kingdom of Prussia. He served in the Prussian Army, and studied at the Universities of Heidelberg and Würzburg, In 1881, he immigrated to the United States, and taught at many private schools and colleges in the East and the South. He married Mary V. Staples in 1886, and they had five children. He settled in Macon, Missouri in 1889 as headmaster of St. James Academy, an Episcopal military school for boys.

In 1896, Blees inherited the wealth of his father's coal and iron mining interests in Germany, and he used this to benefit the city of Macon. He was responsible for the construction of several of the town's commercial buildings and the town's first sewage system; founded the local horseless carriage factory, the first theater, and the First National Bank of Macon; and financed the paving of the town's streets on a 50-50 basis with the city.

In 1898–1899, he took on the construction of the Blees Military Academy, the project that he hoped would be his legacy. As originally constructed, the academy was provided with 400 acres (1.6 km^{2}) surrounding on which were located orchards, a working farm, extensive gardens and a dairy. The pastoral nature of the surrounding environment survives and acts to enhance, through contrast, the monumental Romanesque Revival architecture of Academic Hall and the Gymnasium.

However, Frederick Blees died at the Southern Hotel in St. Louis on September 8, 1906. The academy went bankrupt soon thereafter, and the buildings stood vacant until 1915. In that year, Charles E. Still and Harry M. Still, sons of A. T. Still, the founder of the profession of osteopathic medicine, along with Dr. Arthur G. Hildreth, established the Still-Hildreth Sanatorium, devoted to the treatment and care of all types of nervous and mental disorders. Today, the surviving buildings of Blees Academy are on the National Register of Historic Places and serve as low income housing in Macon.
