= Macon High School (Missouri) =

Coordinates: 39.7461°N 92.4640°W

- 702 North Missouri; Macon, Missouri; United States

Information
- School district: Macon County R-1 School District
- Staff: 27.91 (on an FTE basis)
- Enrollment: 418 (2023–2024)
- Student to teacher ratio: 14.98
- Colors: Orange and Black
- Mascot: Tiger/Tigerette
- Website: highschool.macon.k12.mo.us

Macon High School is a public secondary school in Macon, Missouri.
