= Lester and Norma Dent House =

Historic house in Missouri, United States

- U.S. National Register of Historic Places
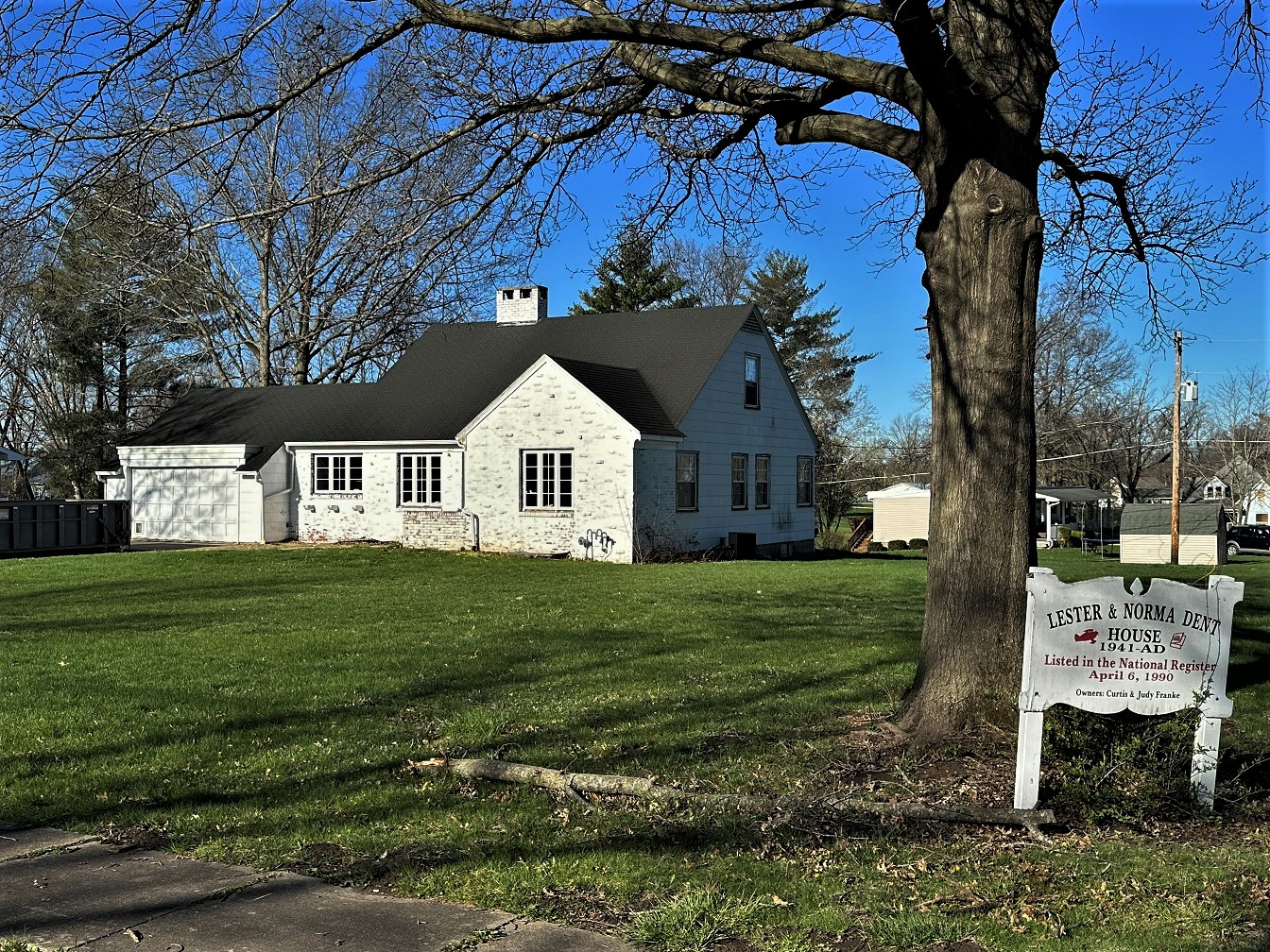
- The Dent House in 2024

- Location within Missouri Location within the United States
- Location: 225 N. Church St. La Plata, Missouri
- Coordinates: 40°1′31″N 92°29′41″W
- Area: less than one acre
- Built: 1941
- Architect: Dent, Lester
- Architectural style: Modern Movement
- NRHP reference No.: 90000763
- Added to NRHP: May 18, 1990

Lester and Norma Dent House, also known as the House of Gadgets, is a historic home located at La Plata, Macon County, Missouri. It was built in 1941, and is a one-and-a-half-story, Modern Movement style dwelling sheathed in brick and asbestos siding. The house has a gable roof and is of the Cape Cod cottage type. It was the home of American pulp-fiction author Lester Dent (1904–1959).

It was listed on the National Register of Historic Places in 1990.
