= Macon County Courthouse and Annex =

- U.S. National Register of Historic Places
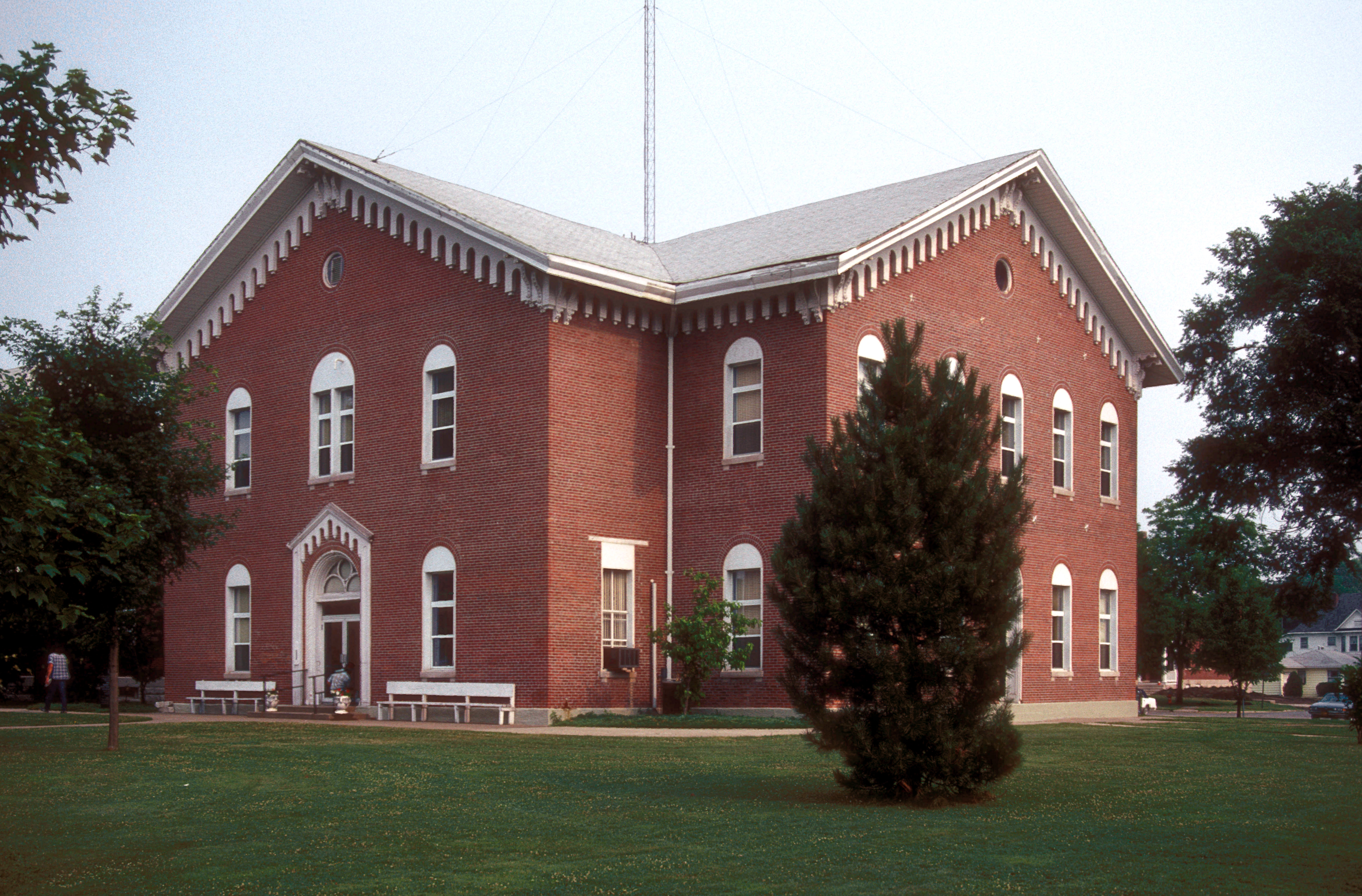

- Location within Missouri Location within the United States
- Location: Courthouse Sq., Macon, Missouri
- Coordinates: 39°44′32″N 92°28′22″W
- Area: 1.5 acres (0.61 ha)
- Built: 1865
- Architect: Aldrich, Levi; Konefas, John H.
- Architectural style: Romanesque, Italianate
- NRHP reference No.: 78001668
- Added to NRHP: December 8, 1978

The Macon County Courthouse and Annex is a historic courthouse and annex located at Courthouse Sq. in Macon, Macon County, Missouri. It was built in 1865, and is a two-story, cross-plan, Romanesque Revival style brick building with Italianate style detailing. It sits on a limestone foundation and has a gross-gable roof. The annex building was constructed in 1895. It is a two-story, T-shaped, building constructed of red brick with limestone, wooden and cast iron trim.

It was added to the National Register of Historic Places in 1978.
