= Gilbreath-McLorn House =

Historic house in Missouri, United States

- U.S. National Register of Historic Places
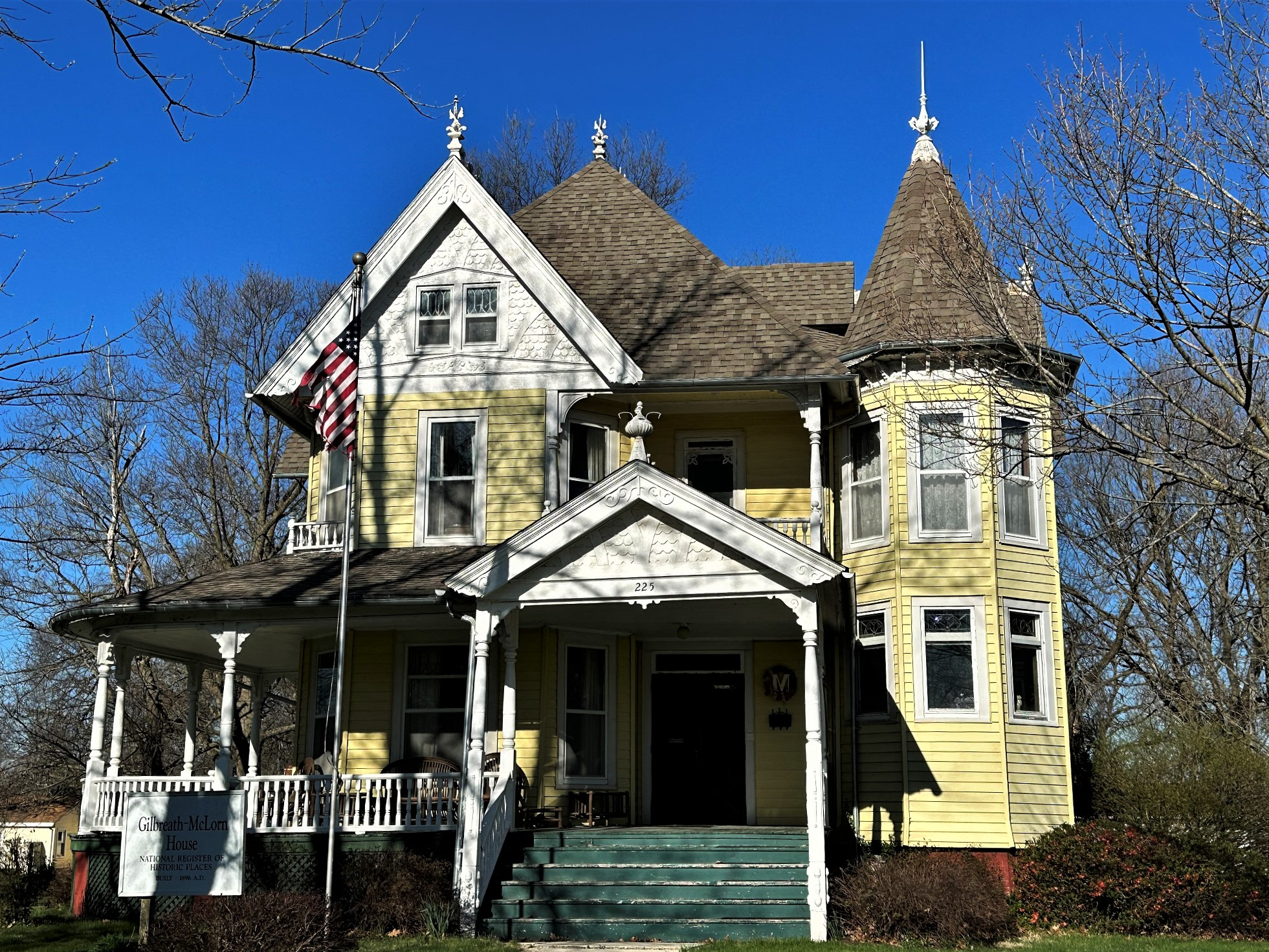
- Gilbreath-McLom House in 2024

- Location within Missouri Location within the United States
- Location: 225 N. Owenby, La Plata, Missouri
- Coordinates: 40°1′31″N 92°29′36″W
- Area: 0.5 acres (0.20 ha)
- Built: 1896
- Architectural style: Stick/eastlake, Queen Anne
- NRHP reference No.: 78001667
- Added to NRHP: November 16, 1978

Gilbreath-McLorn House, also known as the McLorn House and Gilbreath Homestead, is a historic home located at La Plata, Macon County, Missouri. It was built in 1896, and is a two-story, Queen Anne style frame dwelling with full attic and basement. It has a multi-gabled roof and octagonal tower, wraparound porch with Eastlake movement scrolled brackets, and two additional hip-roofed porches.

It was listed on the National Register of Historic Places in 1978.
