= John T. and Mary M. Doneghy House =

Historic house in Missouri, United States

- U.S. National Register of Historic Places
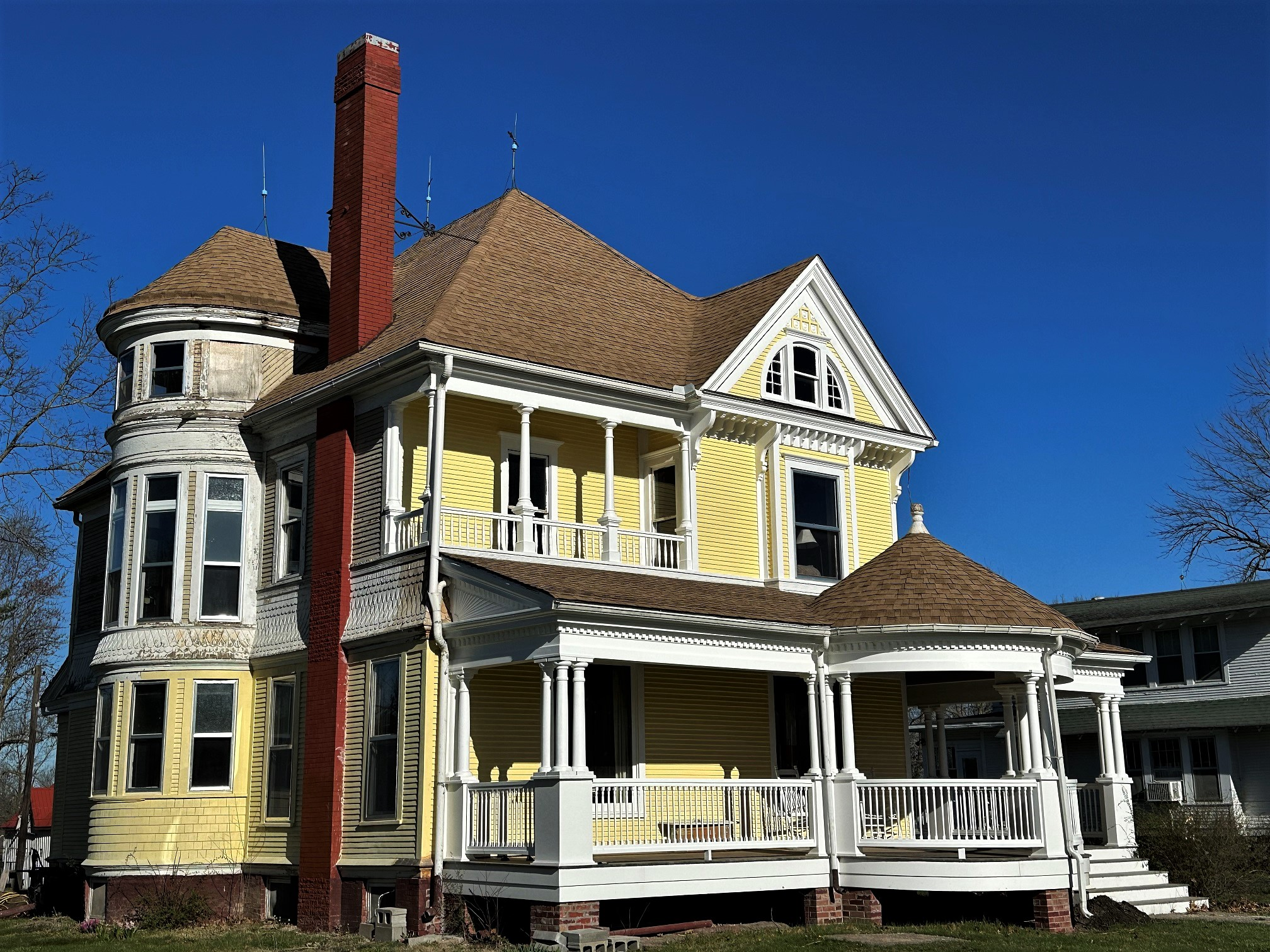
- The Doneghy House in 2024

- Location within Missouri Location within the United States
- Location: 301 N. Owensby St. La Plata, Missouri
- Coordinates: 40°1′33″N 92°29′35″W
- Area: less than one acre
- Built: 1895
- Architectural style: Queen Anne
- NRHP reference No.: 90000488
- Added to NRHP: March 22, 1990

John T. and Mary M. Doneghy House, also known as the Doneghy-Surbeck-Green House, is a historic home located at La Plata, Macon County, Missouri. It was built about 1895, and is a 2 1/2-story, Queen Anne style frame dwelling. It has an irregular plan, steep hipped roof with lower cross gables, and a one-story wraparound porch with centered turret and second story balcony.

It was listed on the National Register of Historic Places in 1990.
