= Johnson Morrow House =

Historic house in Missouri, United States

- U.S. National Register of Historic Places
- Location within Missouri Location within the United States
- Location: Second St. W of jct. with Pine St., Callao, Missouri
- Coordinates: 39°45′44″N 92°37′33″W
- Area: less than one acre
- Built: c. 1912
- Architectural style: Queen Anne, Four-square
- NRHP reference No.: 94000703
- Added to NRHP: July 7, 1994

Johnson Morrow House is a historic home located at Callao, Macon County, Missouri. It was built about 1912, and is a two-story, Queen Anne style frame dwelling. The house measures 37 feet by 49 feet and is cubic in shape. It has a complex hipped roof, large side bays, and a full front porch.

It was listed on the National Register of Historic Places in 1994.
