= La Plata Square Historic District =

Historic district in Missouri, United States

- U.S. National Register of Historic Places
- U.S. Historic district
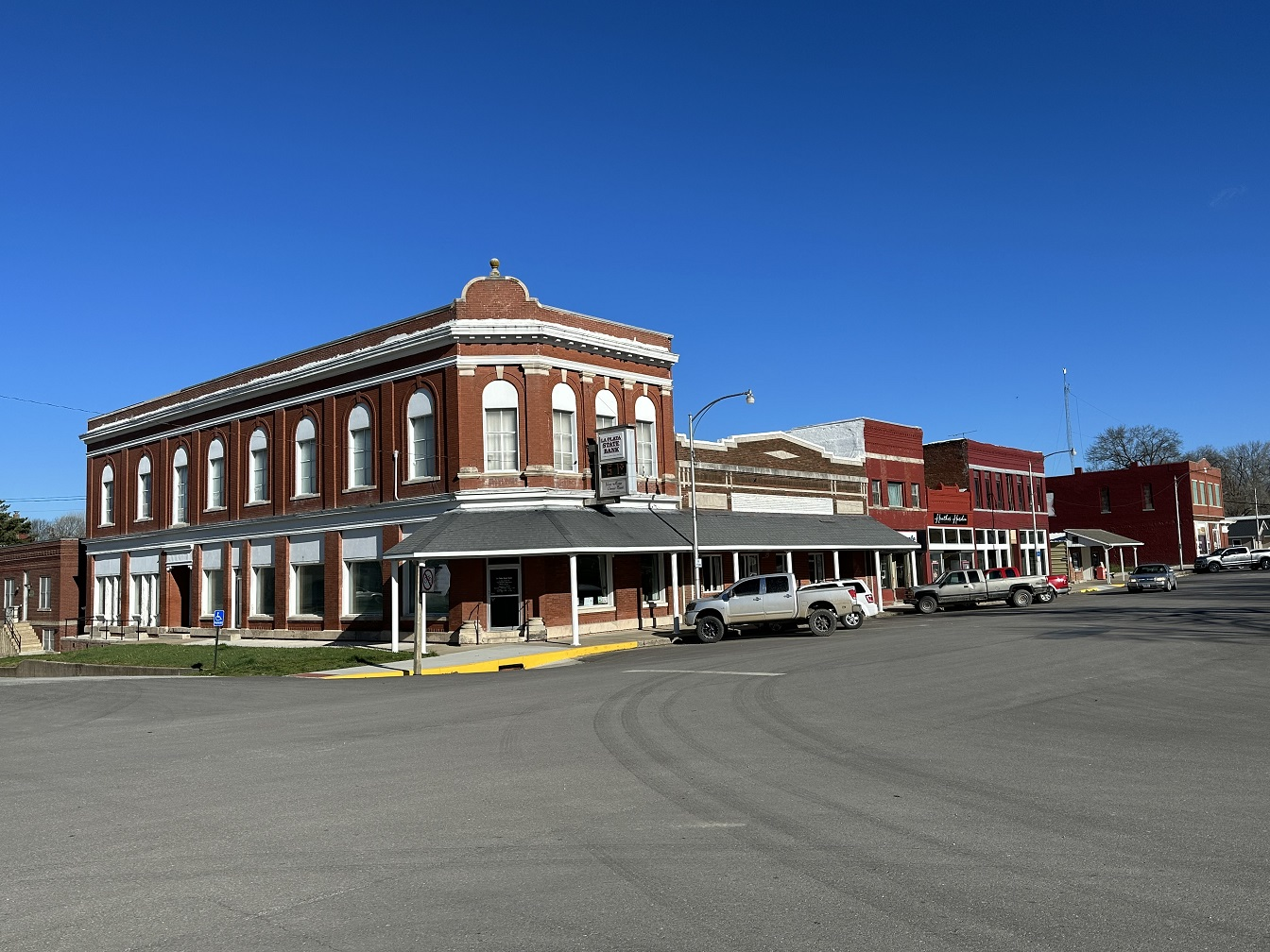
- La Plata Square Historitc District in 2024

- Location within Missouri Location within the United States
- Location: Along portions of Gex, Sanders, and Moore St., La Plata, Missouri
- Coordinates: 40°01′23″N 92°29′28″W
- Area: 13 acres (5.3 ha)
- Built: 1855
- Architectural style: Early Commercial, One and two part block
- NRHP reference No.: 08000696
- Added to NRHP: November 20, 2008

La Plata Square Historic District is a national historic district located at La Plata, Macon County, Missouri. The district encompasses 36 contributing buildings, 1 contributing site, and 1 contributing structure in the central business district and surrounding residential area of La Plata. It developed between about 1855 and 1958, and includes representative examples of commercial architecture. Notable contributing resources include the La Plata Public Square (1855), Home Press Building (c. 1877), Farmer's and Merchants Bank (c. 1902), Myron Sears Variety (c. 1909), Masonic Hall/La Plata State Bank (c. 1902), Tonkinson and Harris Ford Dealership (c. 1910), The Famous (1908), Wheatcraft Motor Company (1924), La Plata Fire Department (c. 1928), and Post Office (1937).

It was listed on the National Register of Historic Places in 2008.
