= Wardell House (Macon, Missouri) =

Historic house in Missouri, United States

- U.S. National Register of Historic Places
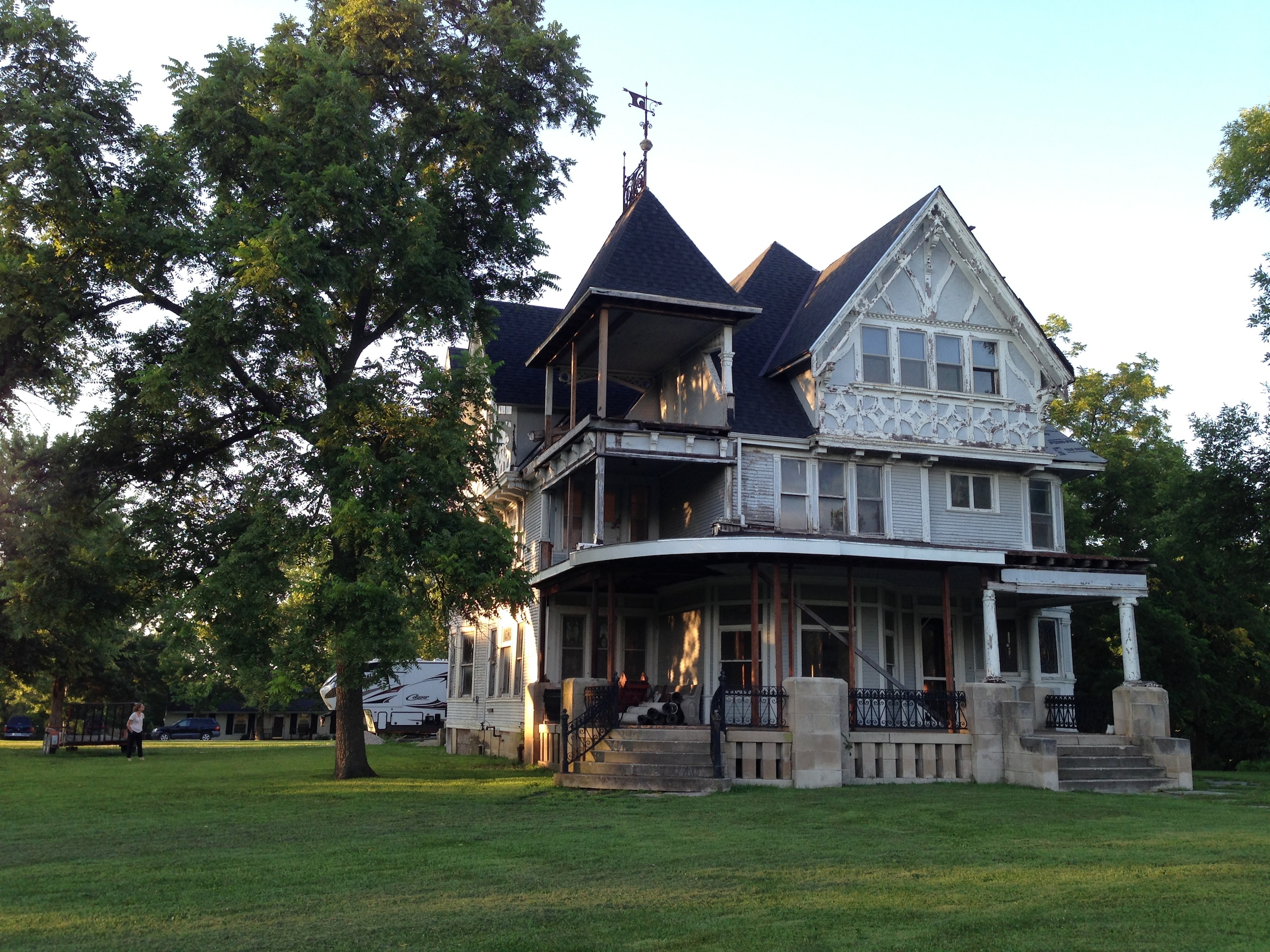

- Location within Missouri Location within the United States
- Location: 1 Wardell Rd., Macon, Missouri
- Coordinates: 39°44′32″N 92°28′37″W
- Built: 1890
- Architect: Still, Thomas A.
- Architectural style: Queen Anne, Victorian Queen Anne
- Demolished: c. 2023
- NRHP reference No.: 86000333
- Added to NRHP: March 12, 1986

The Wardell House was a historic home located at 1 Wardell Rd. in Macon, Macon County, Missouri. It was built in 1890, and it was a three-story, Queen Anne-style frame dwelling over a full basement. It was remodeled between 1899 and 1901. It had a complex hipped roof line and asymmetrical plan, and it featured a full-width verandah and an open tower on its second and third stories.

It was listed on the National Register of Historic Places in 1986.

As of 2023, the Wardell House was demolished in its entirety, and the grounds upon which it sat were cleared of foliage and fully repurposed for the construction of a set of private, duplex housing units.
