= Blees Military Academy =

- U.S. National Register of Historic Places
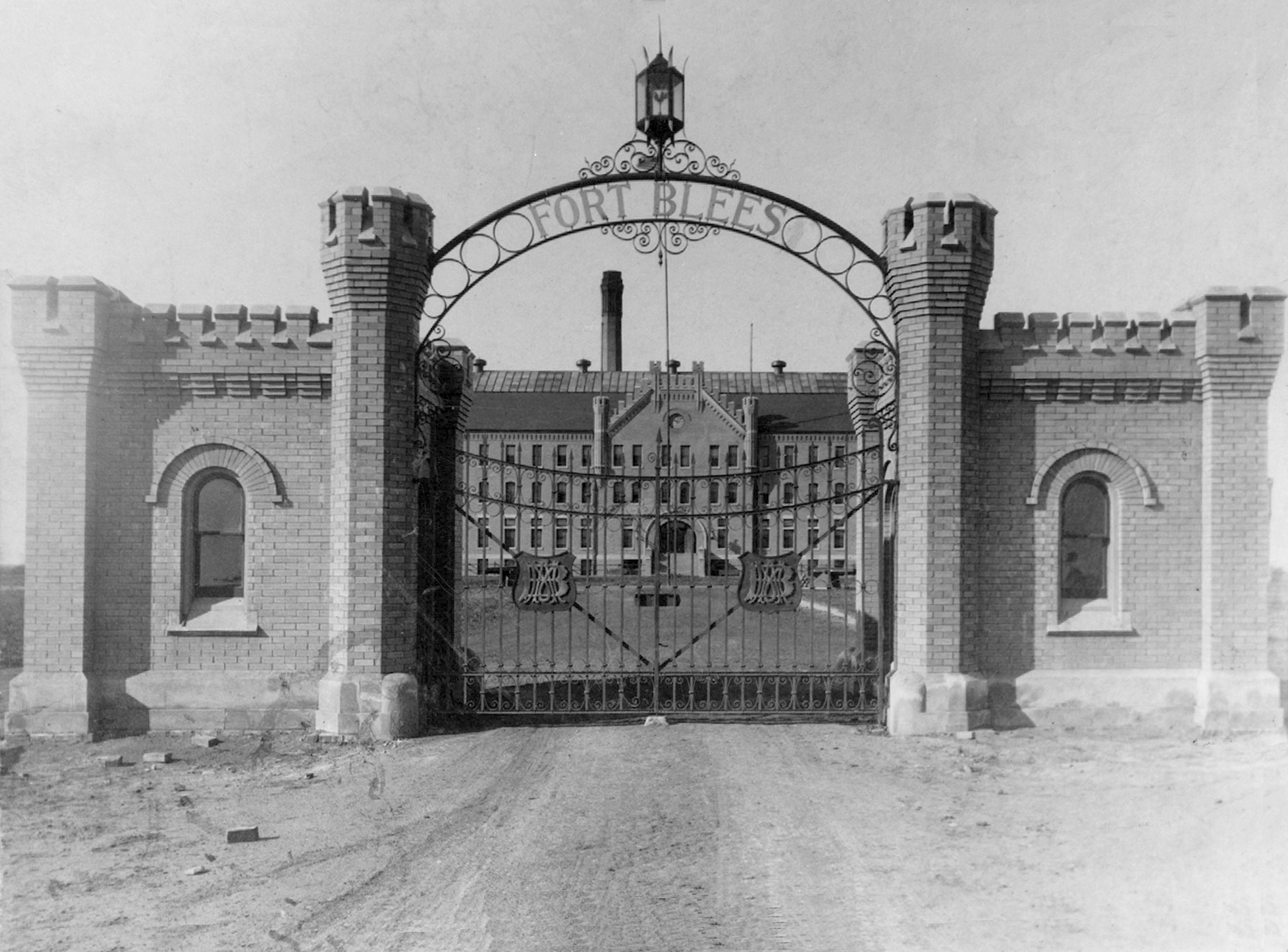
- Blees Military Academy in 1900

- Location within Missouri Location within the United States
- Location: U.S. 63, Macon, Missouri
- Coordinates: 39°43′14″N 92°28′0″W
- Area: 7 acres (2.8 ha)
- Built: 1898
- Architect: Kirsch, R.G.
- Architectural style: Romanesque
- NRHP reference No.: 79001380
- Added to NRHP: October 11, 1979

Blees Military Academy, also known as Still-HiIdreth Osteopathic Sanatorium, was an historic military academy located in Macon, Missouri. The academy operated between 1899 and 1915. The old Academic Hall and Gymnasium of Blees Academy were listed on the National Register of Historic Places in 1979.

== History ==
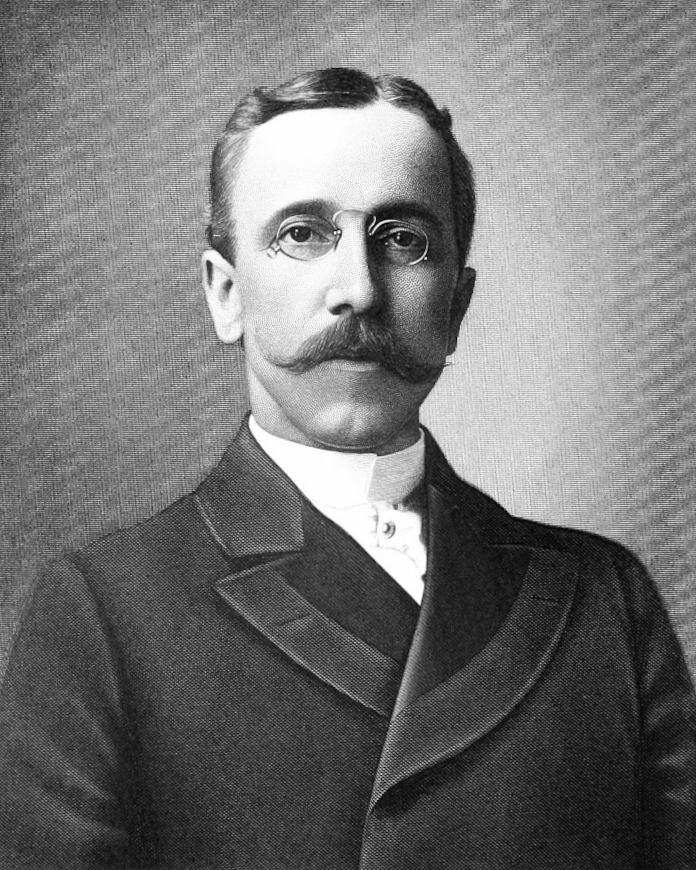
Frederick W. V. Blees

Blees Military Academy was founded in September 1899 by Colonel Frederick W. V. Blees. Blees was a Prussian immigrant who arrived in Macon in 1889 to take over as headmaster of St. James Academy, an Episcopalian military school for boys. In 1896, Blees inherited his father's coal and iron mining interests in Germany, and he used his newfound wealth to benefit the City of Macon, including building commercial buildings, the town's first theater and sewage system; a local horseless carriage factory, the First National Bank of Macon, and financing the paving of the town's streets.

In 1898–1899, Blees took on the project that he hoped would be his legacy - the construction of the Blees Military Academy. Architecturally, Academic Hall and the Gymnasium are a unique expression of the Romanesque Revival style in their rural locale. As originally constructed, the Academy was provided with 400 acres (1.6 km^{2}) surrounding on which were located orchards, a working farm, extensive gardens and a dairy, the pastoral nature of the surrounding environment survives and acts to enhance, through contrast, the monumental Romanesque Revival architecture of Academic Hall and the Gymnasium. Blees cadets rode Rex McDonald and George Washington, two of the nation's best saddle horses. They played polo and had the most luxurious accommodations of the time.

Blees spared no expense with this Academy. Academic Hall and the Gymnasium were both constructed in a variant of the Romanesque Revival style. Decorative features of these buildings include crenellated gables and parapets, distinctive corbel tables and bartizans supported by corbeled culs-de-lampe.

Academic Hall was constructed of structural concrete and steel beams supported on iron columns and faced with buff brick and limestone over a concrete foundation. Academic Hall is capped with a hipped roof of red asbestos shingles and a large, gabled skylight because the building was designed to be fireproof, all interior features, window casings, doors and moldings, except for some wooden and cork floors which rest directly on concrete, were clad in molded copper. All walls and ceilings were finished with plaster. The interior of Academic Hall reveals three floors and a basement. High coffered ceilings in the large open areas of the first floor were supported by Tuscan style iron columns and pilasters. A grand, wrought and cast iron staircase led to the second floor sun parlor. Galleried apartments at the second and third floor levels surrounded this grand open space, recessed behind a two-story Tuscan order colonnade. The large skylight above was suspended from 42-foot-span riveted Howe type steel trusses supported by steel columns 14 feet (4.3 m) above the top of the I beams just above the main ceiling. This trusswork also supports the gabled skylight above visible on the building's exterior. Academic Hall originally included 110 individual sleeping rooms of a small size (approximately 8’ X 12’), 12 suites of faculty apartments, 3 large laboratories, a photographic darkroom, a study hall, a hospital, a carpentry shop, a drafting room, a large dining room and a huge kitchen.

The Gymnasium was of frame construction faced with buff brick and limestone over a concrete foundation, and featured a hipped roof faced with red tiles. The plan of the Gymnasium originally included an indoor running track, a shooting gallery, the gymnasium proper, and a swimming pool, as well as showers and other accessory rooms. The roofing was supported by modified Warren roof trusses of iron and timber spanning over 61 feet (19 m) long. On the south side, a reinforced concrete tunnel ran from the Gymnasium to the basement of Academic Hall.

However, Frederick Blees was found dead in 1906, in St. Louis. Many suspected suicide, due to possible financial problems. The Academy listed Graduates in the Macon paper up through the spring of 1913, but Mary Staples Blees Leibig (Blees' remarried widow) was suing someone for taking control of the Academy. In 1915 Dr. Arthur G. Hildreth and Charles E. and Harry M. Still, sons of Andrew Taylor Still, the founder of the profession of osteopathic medicine, established a sanatorium devoted to the treatment and care of all types of nervous and mental disorders. The sanatorium remained in operation until 1968. Today, the old Academic Hall and Gymnasium of Blees Academy are on the National Register of Historic Places and serve as low income housing for the citizens of Macon.

== Notable alumni ==
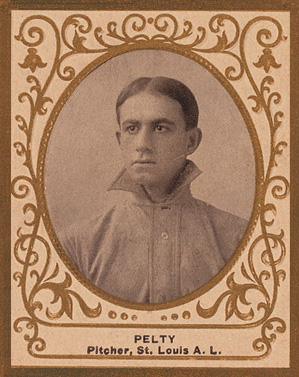
Barney Pelty

- James P. Kem, United States Senator from Missouri, 1947–1953.
- Barney Pelty, Major League Baseball pitcher, 1903–1912.
- Wendell Stephens, served in the Colorado state legislature, 1908–1913.
- Dr. Rudolph M. Anderson, noted zoologist.
