= Macon, Missouri =

City in Missouri, U.S.

- City
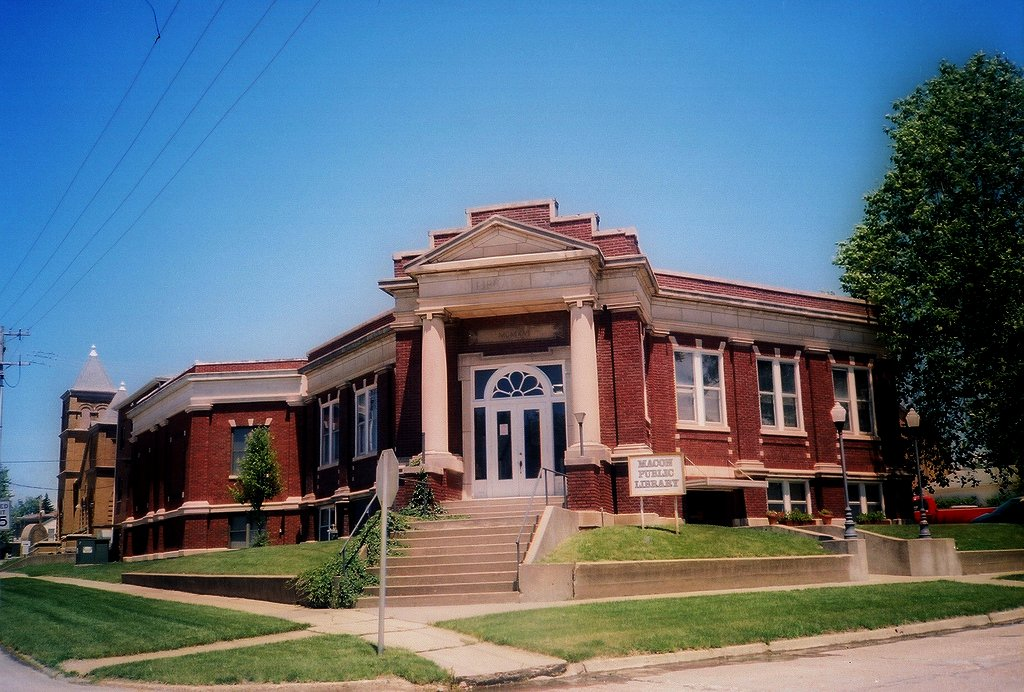
- Macon Public Library

- Location in Macon County and the state of Missouri
- Coordinates: 39°44′33″N 92°28′16″W
- Country: United States
- State: Missouri
- County: Macon

Government
  - Mayor: Tony E. Petre

Area
  - Total: 6.37 sq mi (16.49 km^{2})
  - Land: 6.06 sq mi (15.70 km^{2})
  - Water: 0.31 sq mi (0.79 km^{2})
- Elevation: 860 ft (260 m)

Population (2020)
  - Total: 5,457
  - Density: 900.2/sq mi (347.57/km^{2})
- Time zone: UTC-6 (Central (CST))
  - Summer (DST): UTC-5 (CDT)
- ZIP code: 63552
- Area code: 660
- FIPS code: 29-45326
- GNIS feature ID: 2395803
- Website: cityofmacon-mo.gov

Macon is a city in and the county seat of Macon County, Missouri, United States. The population was 5,457 at the 2020 census.

== History ==
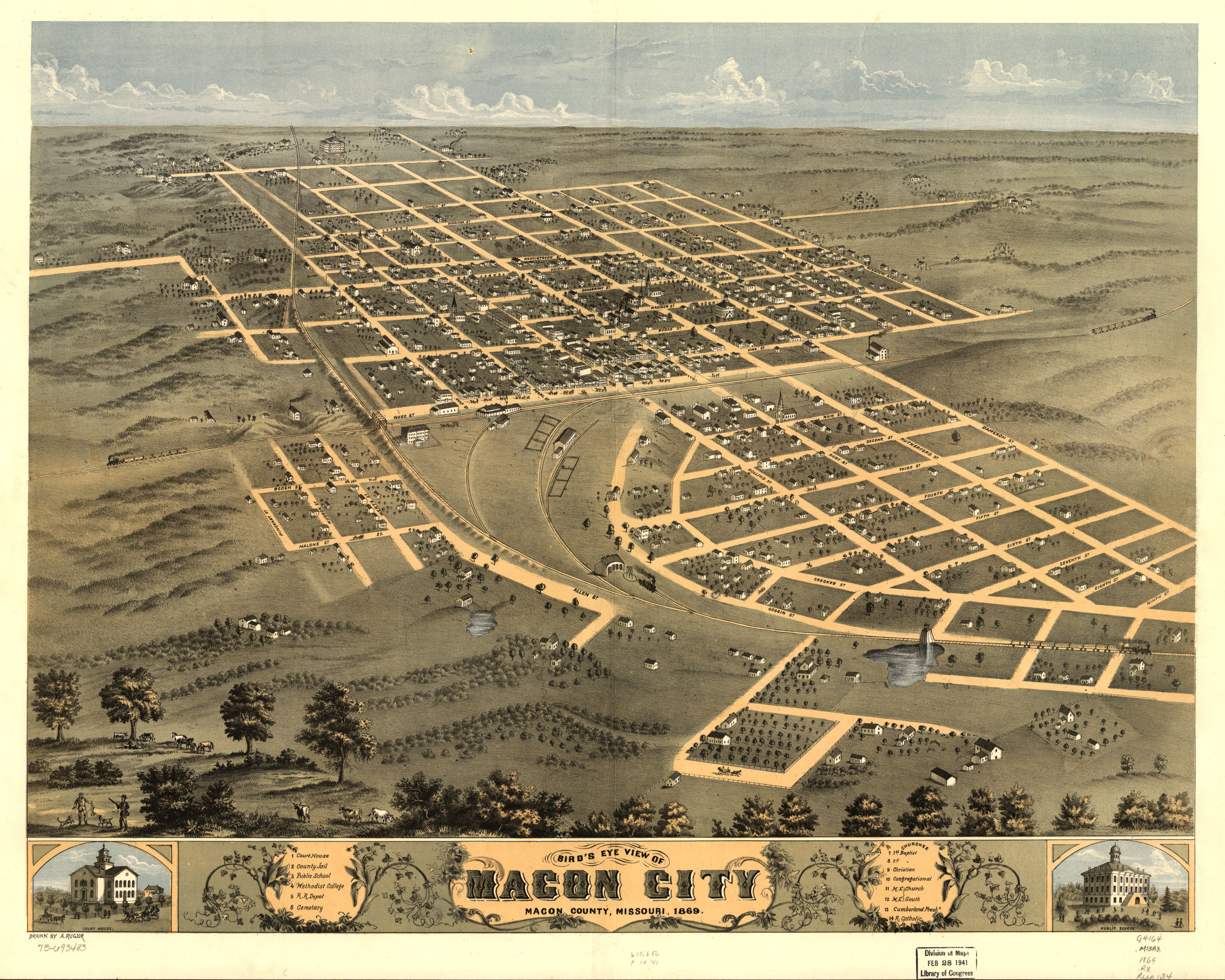
Bird's-eye view of Macon in 1869

Macon was platted in 1856. Like the county itself, Macon was named for Nathaniel Macon. A post office called "Macon City" was established in 1856, and the name was changed to Macon in 1892.

The Western Baptist Bible College opened its two-story Macon campus in January 1892, having previously been established in Independence, Missouri. The college considers itself to be the "oldest African American school west of the Mississippi River". It continued operations in Macon until it was finally relocated to its present-day campus at the Ridge Estate in Kansas City, in September 1920.

In May 1898, there was a string of break-ins in the area of Macon. The break-ins included the theft of food and items, as well as assaults on women. In late June, there was a break-in at the home of John Koechel, a blind broom maker. During this break-in, there were references to previous assaults, an attempted assault, and a theft of two sacks of flour. Police officers followed a trail of tiny white specks to the home of Henry Williams, a 30-year-old African American man, who was later arrested with no resistance. The night of Williams' arrest, crowds formed at the courthouse, while a local pastor, Rev. G. A. Robbins, pled for the crowd to allow the law to take its proper course. The crowd moved on to the jail, and demanded Sheriff A. J. Glenn give up Williams. Glenn and his deputies refused the crowd's demands. A man called Mr. McVicker made a speech to attempt to pacify the crowd, but was knocked out by a thrown brick. The crowd knocked down the fence, stole the key, and unlocked Williams' cell, confronting the cowering man. The mob of 200-300 men decided they would hang him from a bridge instead of electrical lights, so they would not offend the women and children in the morning. In the early morning hours of June 30, 1898, Henry Williams was lynched on the Wabash bridge; he maintained his innocence when asked if he wanted to say anything.

In November 1919 four African-Americans were arrested for allegedly robbing a white farmer. They were held at the Macon prison but on Saturday, November 15, 1919, a white mob drove into town and demanded that the sheriff hand them over. At first he refused but when the mob threatened to use dynamite to destroy the prison the four black men were handed over and they were then driven to Moberly, Missouri and lynched.

Macon was located along the first railroad built across the State of Missouri, completed by the Hannibal and St. Joseph Railroad on February 13, 1859. Passenger rail served the town for over a century. The last daytime train passed through the town on April 9, 1968, when the Kansas City Zephyr between Chicago and Kansas City was discontinued. The overnight variation, the American Royal Zephyr was subsequently discontinued in 1971. The depot, located between Rollins and Rubey streets, was later demolished.

The Blees Military Academy, Macon County Courthouse and Annex, and now-demolished Wardell House are listed on the National Register of Historic Places.

== Geography ==
Macon is in southeastern Macon County. Two US highways cross in the city. U.S. Route 36, passing through the northern side of the city, leads east 62 miles (100 km) to Hannibal and west 33 miles (53 km) to Brookfield, while U.S. Route 63 passes through the city as Missouri Street, leading north 34 miles (55 km) to Kirksville and south 23 miles (37 km) to Moberly.

According to the U.S. Census Bureau, the city of Macon has a total area of 6.37 square miles (16.50 km^{2}), of which 6.06 square miles (15.70 km^{2}) are land and 0.30 square miles (0.78 km^{2}), or 4.78%, are water. Macon Lake is in the northwest part of the city. The west side of the city drains toward the East Fork of the Little Chariton River, a tributary of the Missouri River, while the east side drains toward the Middle Fork of the Salt River, a direct tributary of the Mississippi.

=== Climate ===
Climate data for Macon, Missouri (1991–2020 normals, extremes 1899–present)
Month	Jan	Feb	Mar	Apr	May	Jun	Jul	Aug	Sep	Oct	Nov	Dec	Year
Record high °F (°C)	75 (24)	79 (26)	89 (32)	93 (34)	105 (41)	108 (42)	116 (47)	114 (46)	107 (42)	96 (36)	87 (31)	71 (22)	116 (47)
Mean maximum °F (°C)	60.1 (15.6)	65.0 (18.3)	76.4 (24.7)	83.8 (28.8)	88.8 (31.6)	93.7 (34.3)	97.5 (36.4)	98.0 (36.7)	92.7 (33.7)	85.3 (29.6)	73.2 (22.9)	63.0 (17.2)	99.1 (37.3)
Mean daily maximum °F (°C)	35.3 (1.8)	41.0 (5.0)	52.7 (11.5)	64.2 (17.9)	74.1 (23.4)	83.3 (28.5)	87.5 (30.8)	86.3 (30.2)	79.1 (26.2)	66.8 (19.3)	52.2 (11.2)	40.2 (4.6)	63.6 (17.6)
Daily mean °F (°C)	27.1 (−2.7)	32.1 (0.1)	42.9 (6.1)	53.8 (12.1)	64.4 (18.0)	73.6 (23.1)	77.8 (25.4)	76.0 (24.4)	68.1 (20.1)	56.1 (13.4)	43.1 (6.2)	32.1 (0.1)	53.9 (12.2)
Mean daily minimum °F (°C)	18.9 (−7.3)	23.1 (−4.9)	33.2 (0.7)	43.5 (6.4)	54.7 (12.6)	63.9 (17.7)	68.1 (20.1)	65.8 (18.8)	57.1 (13.9)	45.4 (7.4)	33.9 (1.1)	24.0 (−4.4)	44.3 (6.8)
Mean minimum °F (°C)	−3.0 (−19.4)	3.3 (−15.9)	12.2 (−11.0)	28.3 (−2.1)	38.6 (3.7)	49.9 (9.9)	56.4 (13.6)	55.2 (12.9)	41.2 (5.1)	28.0 (−2.2)	16.7 (−8.5)	2.2 (−16.6)	−6.6 (−21.4)
Record low °F (°C)	−22 (−30)	−27 (−33)	−10 (−23)	9 (−13)	28 (−2)	39 (4)	47 (8)	41 (5)	26 (−3)	7 (−14)	−7 (−22)	−28 (−33)	−28 (−33)
Average precipitation inches (mm)	1.56 (40)	2.07 (53)	2.90 (74)	4.32 (110)	5.44 (138)	5.50 (140)	4.25 (108)	3.82 (97)	3.87 (98)	3.45 (88)	2.74 (70)	2.01 (51)	41.93 (1,065)
Average precipitation days (≥ 0.01 in)	6.7	6.1	8.5	10.8	12.4	11.5	9.0	8.9	7.7	8.5	7.3	7.0	104.4
Source: NOAA

== Demographics ==
Historical population
Census	Pop.	Note	%±
1860	837		—
1870	3,678		339.4%
1880	3,046		−17.2%
1890	3,371		10.7%
1900	4,068		20.7%
1910	3,584		−11.9%
1920	3,549		−1.0%
1930	3,851		8.5%
1940	4,206		9.2%
1950	4,152		−1.3%
1960	4,547		9.5%
1970	5,301		16.6%
1980	5,680		7.1%
1990	5,571		−1.9%
2000	5,538		−0.6%
2010	5,471		−1.2%
2020	5,457		−0.3%
U.S. Decennial Census

=== 2020 census ===
As of the 2020 census, Macon had a population of 5,457. The median age was 41.4 years. 22.7% of residents were under the age of 18 and 24.3% of residents were 65 years of age or older. For every 100 females there were 89.4 males, and for every 100 females age 18 and over there were 85.9 males age 18 and over.

97.4% of residents lived in urban areas, while 2.6% lived in rural areas.

There were 2,378 households in Macon, of which 25.9% had children under the age of 18 living in them. Of all households, 39.9% were married-couple households, 19.7% were households with a male householder and no spouse or partner present, and 32.5% were households with a female householder and no spouse or partner present. About 38.2% of all households were made up of individuals and 19.4% had someone living alone who was 65 years of age or older.

There were 2,678 housing units, of which 11.2% were vacant. The homeowner vacancy rate was 1.8% and the rental vacancy rate was 7.6%.

Racial composition as of the 2020 census
Race	Number	Percent
White	4,725	86.6%
Black or African American	254	4.7%
American Indian and Alaska Native	15	0.3%
Asian	44	0.8%
Native Hawaiian and Other Pacific Islander	4	0.1%
Some other race	46	0.8%
Two or more races	369	6.8%
Hispanic or Latino (of any race)	158	2.9%

=== 2010 census ===
As of the census of 2010, there were 5,471 people, 2,369 households, and 1,357 families living in the city. The population density was 911.8 inhabitants per square mile (352.0/km^{2}). There were 2,727 housing units at an average density of 454.5 per square mile (175.5/km^{2}). The racial makeup of the city was 90.8% White, 5.6% African American, 0.3% Native American, 0.6% Asian, 0.3% from other races, and 2.4% from two or more races. Hispanic or Latino of any race were 1.3% of the population.

There were 2,369 households, of which 27.7% had children under the age of 18 living with them, 42.0% were married couples living together, 11.6% had a female householder with no husband present, 3.7% had a male householder with no wife present, and 42.7% were non-families. 38.1% of all households were made up of individuals, and 18.5% had someone living alone who was 65 years of age or older. The average household size was 2.21 and the average family size was 2.90.

The median age in the city was 42.7 years. 23.2% of residents were under the age of 18; 7.4% were between the ages of 18 and 24; 21.7% were from 25 to 44; 25.1% were from 45 to 64; and 22.5% were 65 years of age or older. The gender makeup of the city was 46.7% male and 53.3% female.

=== 2000 census ===
As of the census of 2000, there were 5,538 people, 2,434 households, and 1,448 families living in the city. The population density was 903.9 inhabitants per square mile (349.0/km^{2}). There were 2,723 housing units at an average density of 444.4 per square mile (171.6/km^{2}). The racial makeup of the city was 92.78% White, 5.36% African American, 0.22% Native American, 0.23% Asian, 0.02% Pacific Islander, 0.42% from other races, and 0.98% from two or more races. Hispanic or Latino of any race were 0.88% of the population.

There were 2,434 households, out of which 27.2% had children under the age of 18 living with them, 46.1% were married couples living together, 10.5% had a female householder with no husband present, and 40.5% were non-families. 37.1% of all households were made up of individuals, and 19.8% had someone living alone who was 65 years of age or older. The average household size was 2.17 and the average family size was 2.82.

In the city, the population was spread out, with 22.7% under the age of 18, 7.7% from 18 to 24, 24.1% from 25 to 44, 21.7% from 45 to 64, and 23.8% who were 65 years of age or older. The median age was 42 years. For every 100 females, there were 85.8 males. For every 100 females age 18 and over, there were 79.3 males.

The median income for a household in the city was $26,738, and the median income for a family was $36,633. Males had a median income of $30,069 versus $18,217 for females. The per capita income for the city was $16,679. About 8.6% of families and 12.8% of the population were below the poverty line, including 11.4% of those under age 18 and 16.8% of those age 65 or over.

== Government and politics ==
The local government of the City of Macon is headed by a directly elected mayor and city council. The latter consists of individuals elected to represent one of Macon's four city wards, with two individuals elected from each ward and serving congruently. As of 2026, the incumbent mayor is Anthony E. "Tony" Petre. The city's current ward members are as follows: Steve Olinger and Ernie Lea (Ward 1); former mayor James "Talt" Holman and Steve Iwanowicz (Ward 2); Jerold Carr and Chris Walk (Ward 3); and Cheryl Blaise and Jerry Thompson (Ward 4).

=== Federal and state representation ===
At the federal level, Macon is represented by two U.S. senators and one U.S. representative.

In the House of Representatives, the city was previously contained wholly within Missouri's 9th congressional district. This district became obsolete and was eliminated after the 2010 census and subsequent nationwide redistricting. It was last represented by Rep. Blaine Luetkemeyer (R), a resident of St. Elizabeth, between 2009 and 2013, who was redistricted into the state's third congressional district. Since 2013, the city of Macon is located entirely within Missouri's 6th congressional district. Since 2001, this congressional district has been represented by Rep. Sam Graves (R), a native of Tarkio, Missouri. Graves was first elected in 2000 to succeed outgoing Rep. Pat Danner (D), defeating former state senator Steve Danner (D), his predecessor's son. Macon itself has been under Graves' legislative jurisdiction since new districts were enacted in 2013, though he has always represented the sixth district since first being elected to the U.S. House of Representatives.

Additionally, as of 2026, the city and the rest of Missouri have been represented at-large in the United States Senate by Sen. Josh Hawley (R) since 2019 and Sen. Eric Schmitt (R) since 2023. Macon has been represented by an all-Republican congressional delegation since 2019, upon the beginning of the 116th United States Congress.

At the state level, Macon is represented by two members of the Missouri General Assembly, one in both the Missouri Senate and the Missouri House of Representatives. In the former, the city is represented by state senator Cindy O'Laughlin (R), who represents the state's eighteenth senatorial district. Sen. O'Laughlin was first elected to her office in 2018, defeating Democratic nominee Crystal Stephens. A resident of neighboring Shelbina, O'Laughlin has since served as Senate Majority leader between 2023 and 2025, as well as Senate President pro tempore since 2025.

In the state's lower chamber, Macon falls squarely within the state's sixth district. Since 2021, this seat has been filled by Rep. Ed Lewis (R), a former high school and college educator based out of nearby Moberly. Rep. Lewis was first elected in 2020 to succeed term-limited Rep. Tim Remole (R), defeating Democratic nominee Terrence Fiala. Macon has been represented by an all-Republican Assembly delegation since 2001, when a special election filled the senatorial vacancy created by the accession of state senator Joe Maxwell to the office of Missouri lieutenant governor.

== Media ==
Radio station KLTI is licensed to Macon.

The Macon R-I High School Journalism Program creates a digital newspaper and publishes it on their website.

== Education ==
Public education in Macon is administered by Macon County R-I School District. Public schools currently operating within the R-I school district include Macon Elementary School, Macon Middle School, Macon High School, and the Macon Area Career and Technical Education Center (MACTEC). All three schools are located within a single, multi-building complex.

Macon has a lending library, the Macon Public Library.

== Notable people ==
- Frederick W. V. Blees (1860–1906), Macon benefactor, founder of Blees Military Academy
- Frank P. Briggs (1894–1982), U.S. senator and Assistant U.S. Secretary of the Interior
- Henderson Forsythe (1917–2006), actor
- Robert Jones, American aerodynamicist and aeronautical engineer for NACA and later NASA. He was known at NASA as "one of the premier aeronautical engineers of the twentieth century". Jones researched the delta wing, the swept wing and the oblique wing.
- James P. Kem (1890–1965), U.S. senator from Missouri, 1947–1953
- Butch Patrick (b. 1953), television actor best known for his role as Eddie Munster on CBS's The Munsters
- Milton A. Romjue (1874–1968), long-time U.S. congressman for Missouri's 1st district
- Maude Mae Rubey, aka Madam Maude Seay (1884–1957), famous Chicago milliner; described by Dorothy Height as "one of the first Negro women to distinguish themselves in business"
- Aurora Snow, former porn actress, director and columnist
- Orlando Ward (1891–1972), World War II major general, United States Army

== See also ==
- List of cities in Missouri
