= 1966 =

Calendar year

1966 in various calendars
- Gregorian calendar: 1966; MCMLXVI
- Ab urbe condita: 2719
- Armenian calendar: 1415; ԹՎ ՌՆԺԵ
- Assyrian calendar: 6716
- Baháʼí calendar: 122–123
- Balinese saka calendar: 1887–1888
- Bengali calendar: 1372–1373
- Berber calendar: 2916
- British Regnal year: 14 Eliz. 2 – 15 Eliz. 2
- Buddhist calendar: 2510
- Burmese calendar: 1328
- Byzantine calendar: 7474–7475
- Chinese calendar: 乙巳年 (Wood Snake); 4663 or 4456 — to — 丙午年 (Fire Horse); 4664 or 4457
- Coptic calendar: 1682–1683
- Discordian calendar: 3132
- Ethiopian calendar: 1958–1959
- Hebrew calendar: 5726–5727
- Hindu calendars
- Vikram Samvat: 2022–2023
- Shaka Samvat: 1887–1888
- Kali Yuga: 5066–5067
- Holocene calendar: 11966
- Igbo calendar: 966–967
- Iranian calendar: 1344–1345
- Islamic calendar: 1385–1386
- Japanese calendar: Shōwa 41 (昭和４１年)
- Javanese calendar: 1897–1898
- Juche calendar: 55
- Julian calendar: Gregorian minus 13 days
- Korean calendar: 4299
- Minguo calendar: ROC 55 民國55年
- Nanakshahi calendar: 498
- Thai solar calendar: 2509
- Tibetan calendar: ཤིང་མོ་སྦྲུལ་ལོ་ (female Wood-Snake); 2092 or 1711 or 939 — to — མེ་ཕོ་རྟ་ལོ་ (male Fire-Horse); 2093 or 1712 or 940

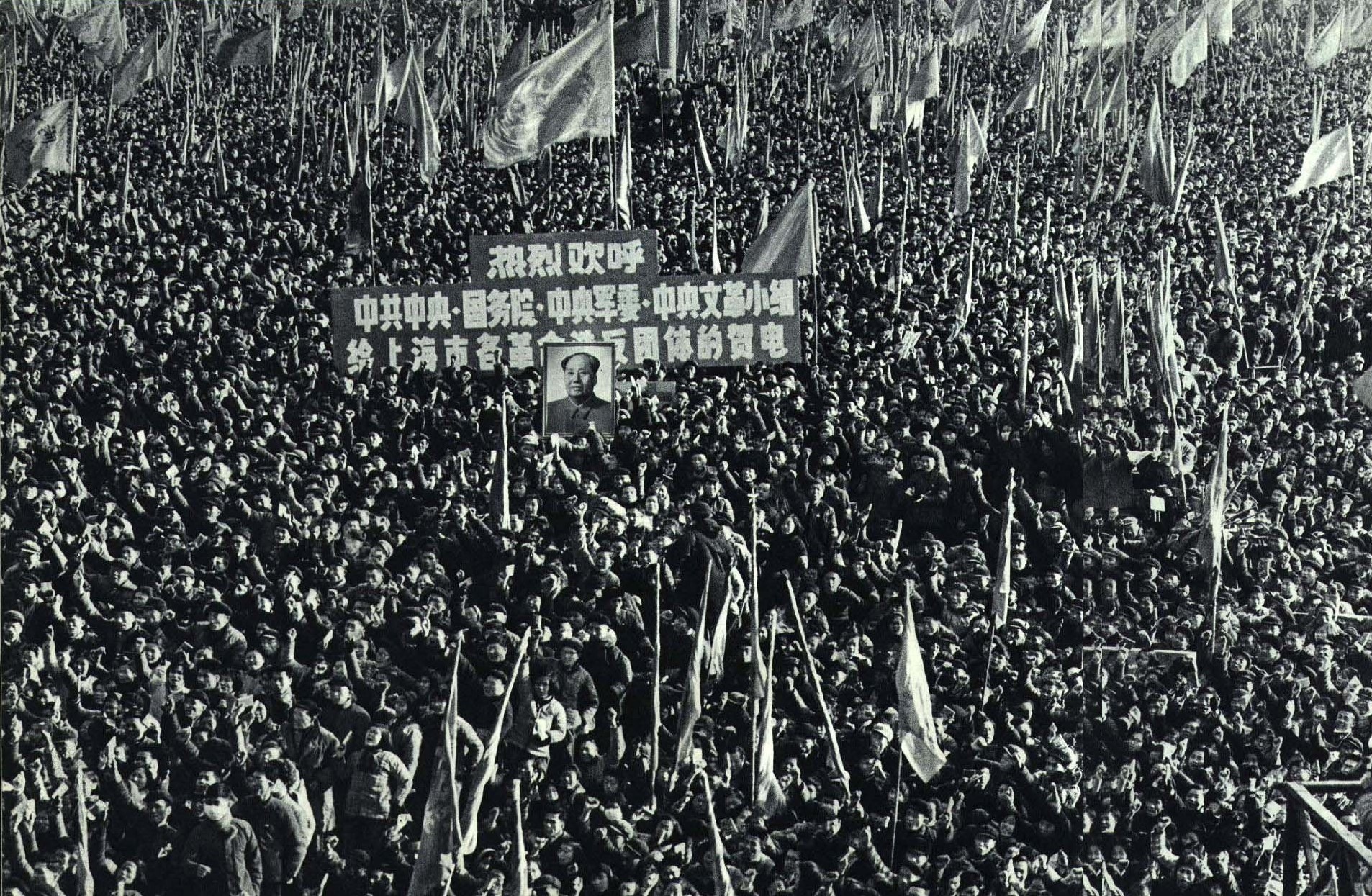
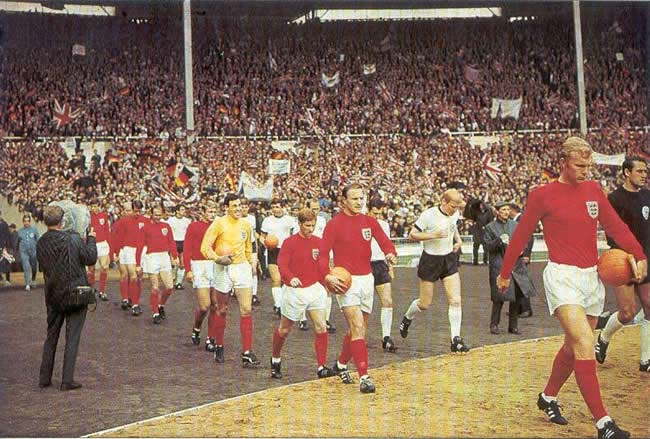
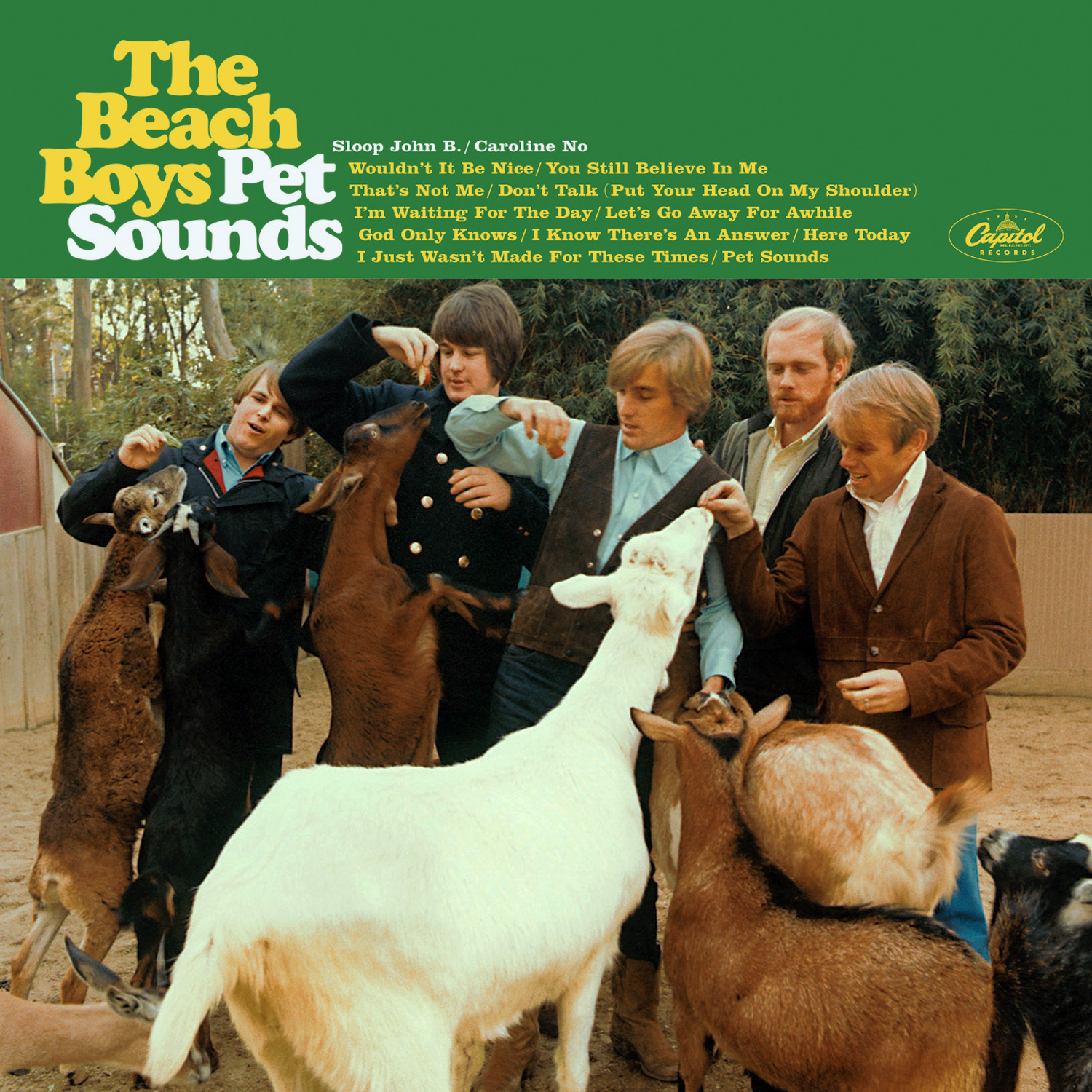
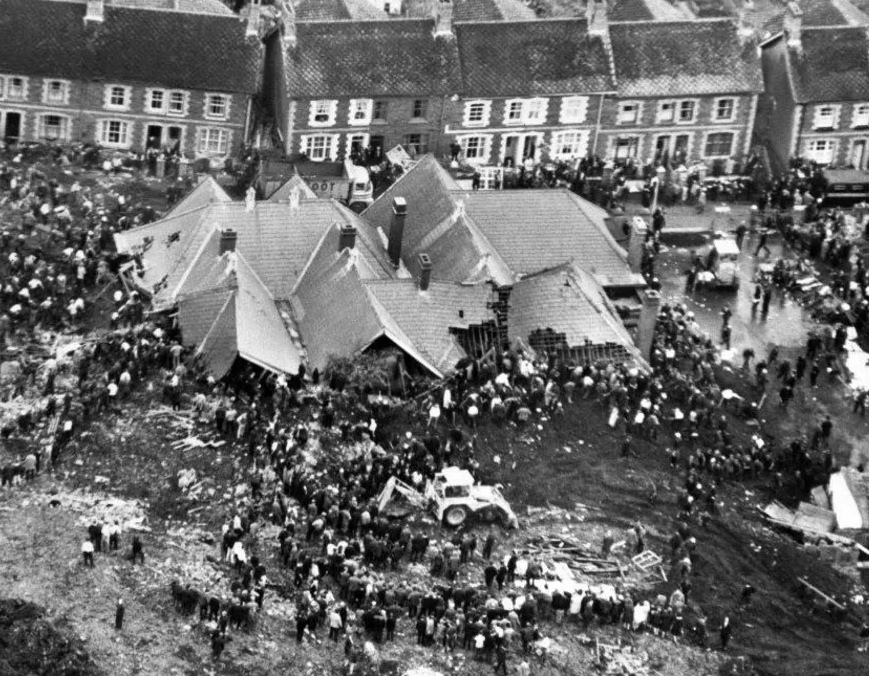
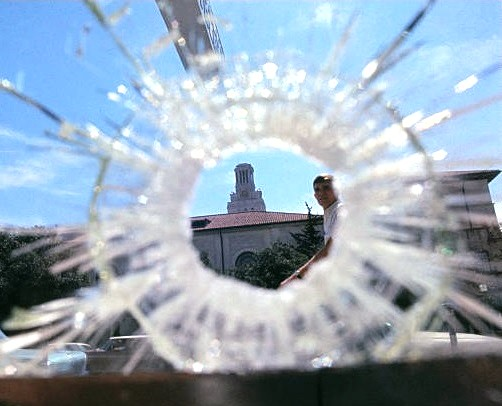
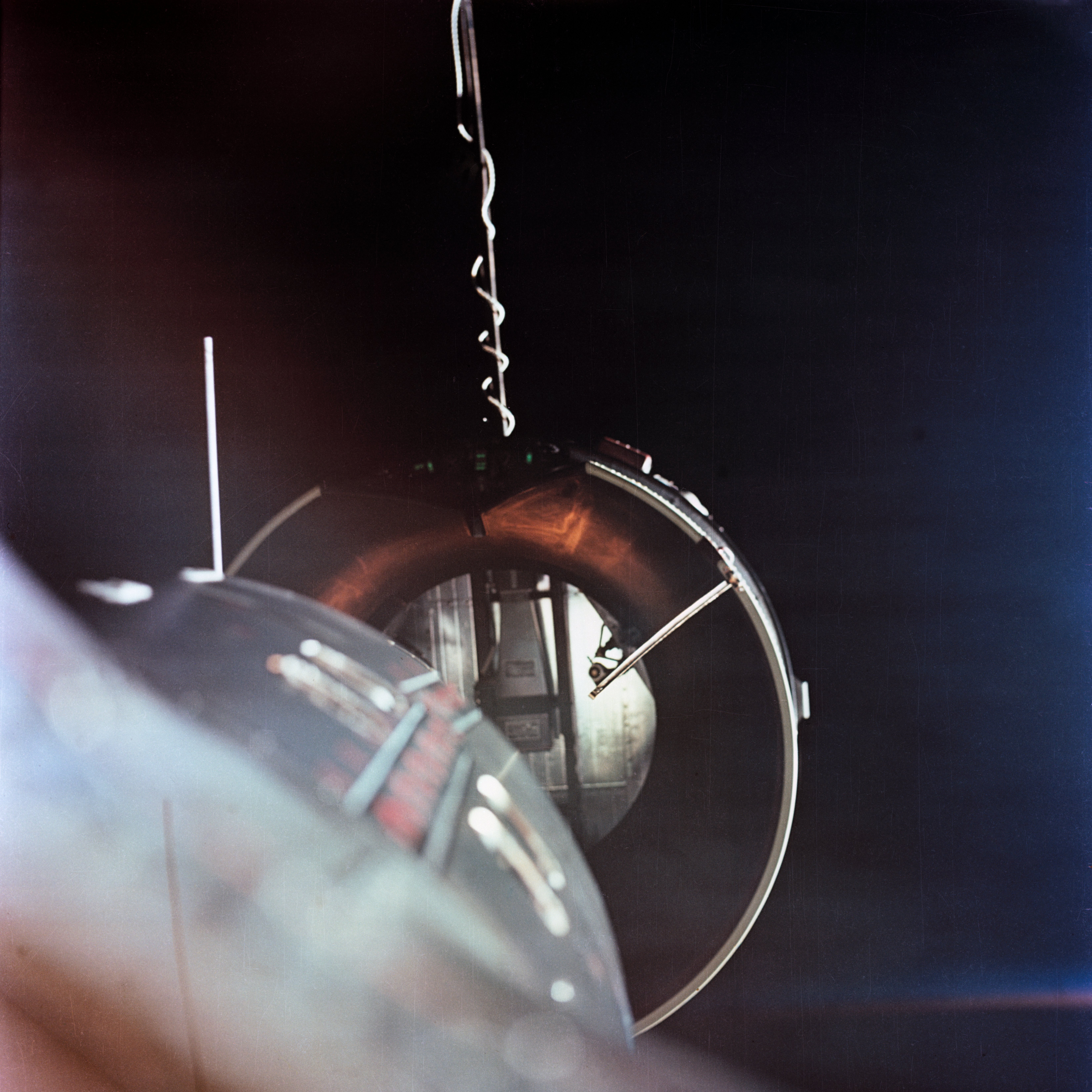
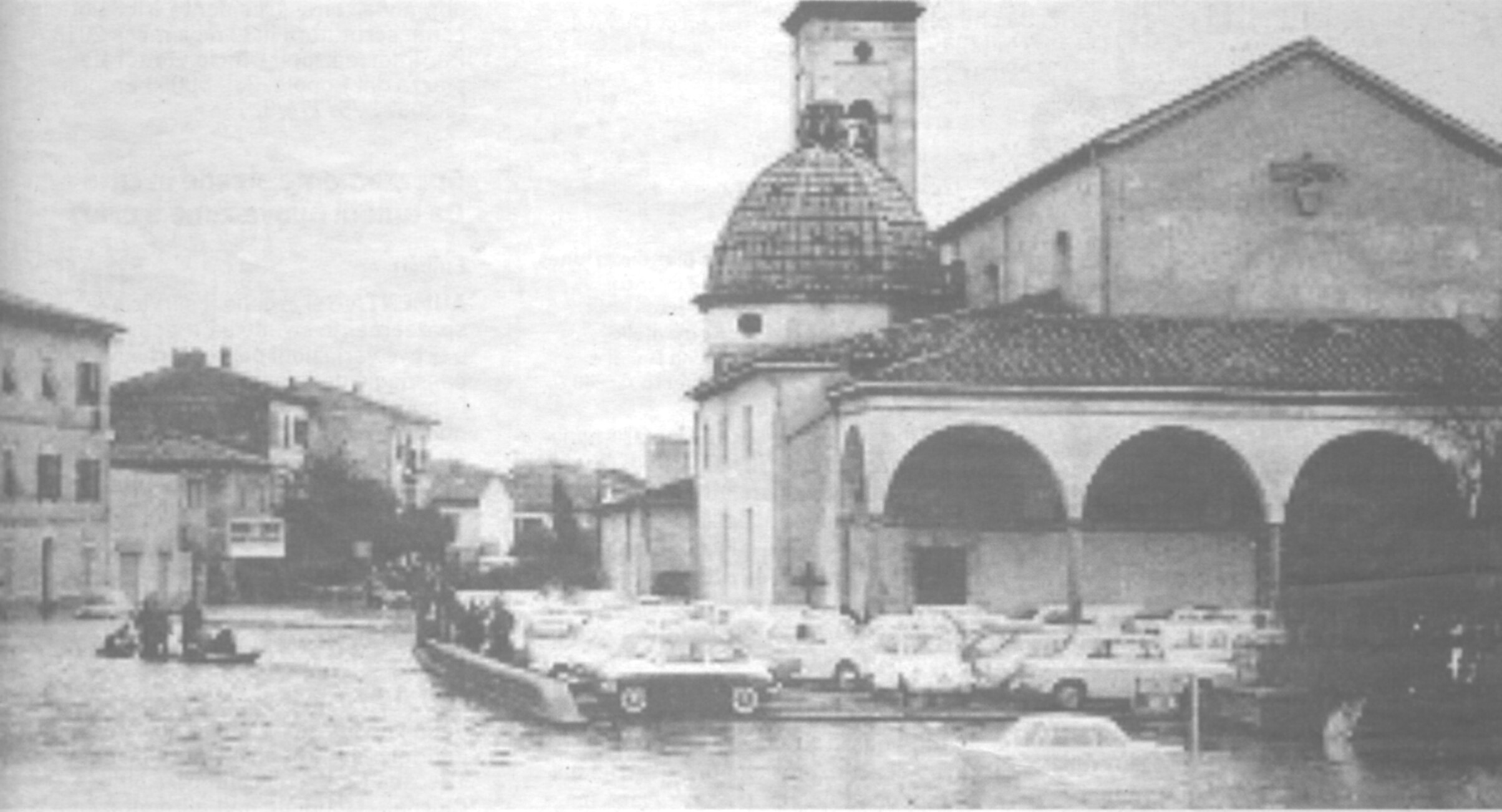
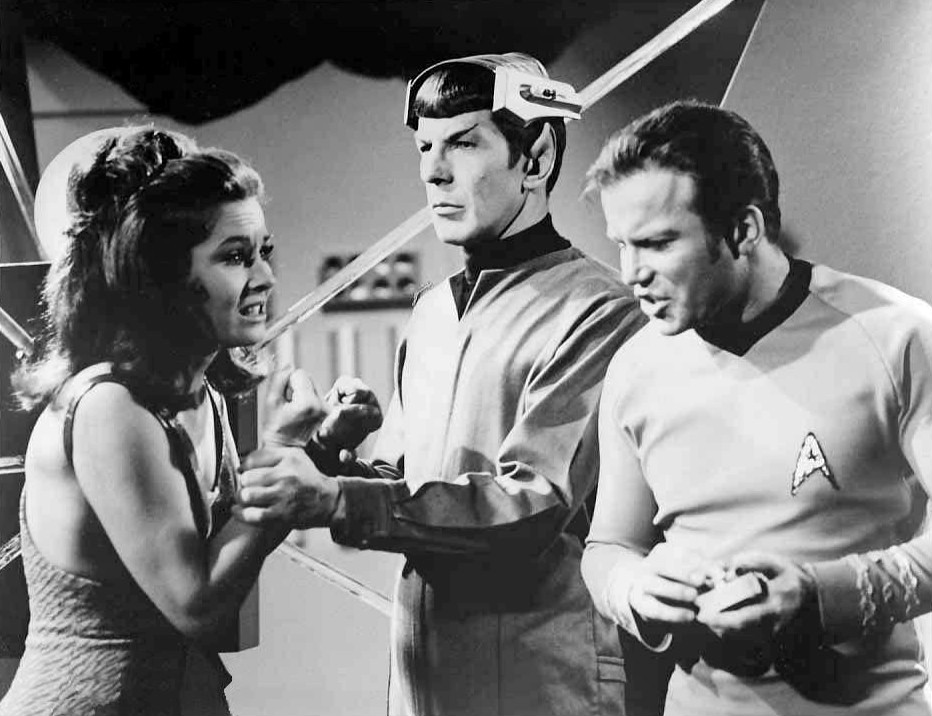
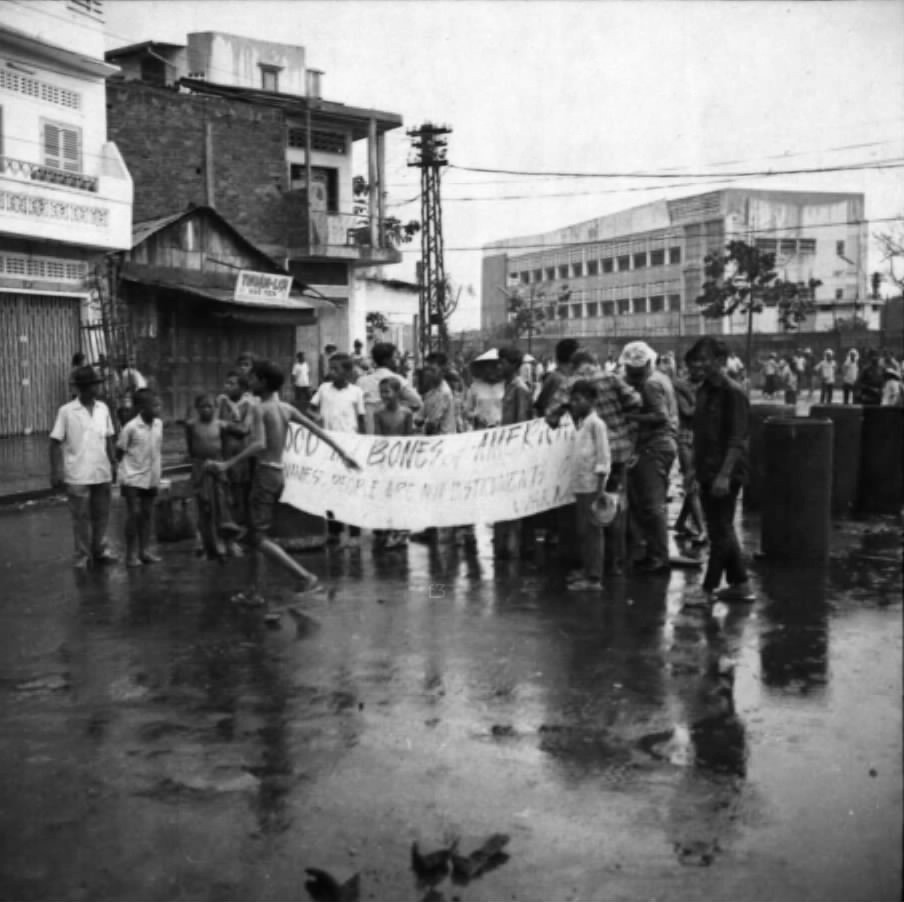
From top to bottom, left to right: the Cultural Revolution begins in Communist China as Mao Zedong mobilizes the Red Guards; the 1966 FIFA World Cup in England sees the host nation defeat West Germany; the Beach Boys release Pet Sounds, produced by Brian Wilson, an album considered a masterpiece; the Aberfan disaster kills 144 people in Wales when a colliery spoil tip collapses; the University of Texas tower shooting kills sixteen; Gemini 8 performs the first orbital docking with the Agena target vehicle; the 1966 flood of the Arno devastates Florence, Italy; Star Trek premieres on NBC; and the Buddhist Uprising in South Vietnam intensifies amid the Vietnam War.

1966 (MCMLXVI) was a common year starting on Saturday of the Gregorian calendar, the 1966th year of the Common Era (CE) and Anno Domini (AD) designations, the 966th year of the 2nd millennium, the 66th year of the 20th century, and the 7th year of the 1960s decade.

== Events ==
=== January ===
- January 1 – In a coup, Colonel Jean-Bédel Bokassa takes over as military ruler of the Central African Republic, ousting President David Dacko.
- January 3 – 1966 Upper Voltan coup d'état: President Maurice Yaméogo is deposed by a military coup in the Republic of Upper Volta (modern-day Burkina Faso).
- January 10
  - Pakistani–Indian peace negotiations end successfully with the signing of the Tashkent Declaration, a day before the sudden death of Indian prime minister Lal Bahadur Shastri.
  - The House of Representatives of the US state of Georgia refuses to allow African-American representative Julian Bond to take his seat, because of his anti-war stance.
- January 15 – 1966 Nigerian coup d'état: A bloody military coup is staged in Nigeria, deposing the civilian government and resulting in the death of Prime Minister Abubakar Tafawa Balewa.
- January 17
  - The Nigerian coup is overturned by another faction of the military, led by Major General Johnson Aguiyi-Ironsi, leaving a military government in power and beginning a long period of military rule.
  - 1966 Palomares B-52 crash: A U.S. Air Force B-52 bomber collides with a KC-135 Stratotanker over Spain, dropping three 70-kiloton hydrogen bombs near the town of Palomares, and one into the sea. Carl Brashear, the first African-American United States Navy diver, is involved in an accident during the recovery of the latter, which results in the amputation of his leg.
- January 19 – Indira Gandhi is elected Prime Minister of India; she is sworn in on January 24.
- January 20 - The Radio Caroline ship Mi Amigo runs aground on the beach at Frinton-on-Sea, Essex, UK.
- January 21 – Italian Prime Minister Aldo Moro resigns due to a power struggle in his party.
- January 22 – The military government of Nigeria announces that ex-prime minister Abubakar Tafawa Balewa was killed during the coup a week previously.
- January 24 – Air India Flight 101 crashes into Mont Blanc, killing all 117 people on board, including Homi J. Bhabha, chairman of the Indian Atomic Energy Commission.
- January 26
  - Disappearance of the Beaumont children: Three children disappear on their way to Glenelg, South Australia, never to be seen again. Their fate remains unknown.
  - 1966 Liberal Party of Australia leadership election: Harold Holt is elected leader of the Liberal Party of Australia unopposed when Sir Robert Menzies retires after an unprecedented 16 years in office; consequently Holt becomes Prime Minister of Australia six days later.
- January 27
  - The British government promises the U.S. that British troops in Malaysia will stay until more peaceful conditions occur in the region.
  - Britain's Labour Party unexpectedly retains the parliamentary seat of Hull North in a by-election, with a swing of 4.5% to their candidate from the opposition Conservatives, and a majority up from 1,181 at the 1964 General Election to 5,351.
- January 31 – The United Kingdom ceases all trade with Rhodesia.

=== February ===
- February 1 – Around 2,600 political prisoners are released by East Germany, in return for "donations" worth approximately $10,000 a head from West Germany.
- February 3 – The unmanned Soviet Luna 9 spacecraft makes the first controlled rocket-assisted landing on the Moon.
- February 4 – All Nippon Airways Flight 60 plunges into Tokyo Bay; 133 people are killed.
- February 7
  - The Great Fire of Iloilo, Philippines, breaks out in a lumber yard and burns for almost half a day, destroying nearly three-quarters of the City Proper area and causing 50 million pesos in total property damage.
  - Lyndon B. Johnson of the United States and Nguyễn Cao Kỳ of South Vietnam convene with other officials in a summit in Honolulu, Hawaii to discuss the course of the Vietnam War.
- February 14 – The Australian dollar is introduced at a rate of 2 dollars per pound, or 10 shillings per dollar.
- February 19 – The naval minister of the United Kingdom, Christopher Mayhew, resigns over defence policy.
- February 20 – While Soviet author and translator Valery Tarsis is abroad, the Soviet Union negates his citizenship.
- February 23 – 1966 Syrian coup d'état: An intra-party military coup in Syria replaces the previous government of Amin al-Hafiz by one led by Salah Jadid.
- February 24 – A coup led by the police and military of Ghana raises the National Liberation Council to power while president Kwame Nkrumah is abroad.
- February 28 – British Prime Minister Harold Wilson calls a general election in the United Kingdom, to be held on March 31.

=== March ===
- March – The DKW automobile ceases production in Germany.
- March 1
  - The British Government announces plans for the decimalisation of the pound sterling (hitherto denominated in 20 shillings and 240 pence to the £), to come into force on 15 February 1971 (Decimal Day).
  - Soviet space probe Venera 3 crashes on Venus, becoming the first spacecraft to land on another planet's surface.
  - The Ba'ath Party takes power in Syria.
- March 2 – Kwame Nkrumah arrives in Guinea and is granted asylum.
- March 3 – A F5 tornado strikes Mississippi and Alabama, causing catastrophic damage over its 200 miles, and kills 57 people
- March 4
  - Canadian Pacific Air Lines Flight 402 crashes during a night landing in poor visibility at Tokyo International Airport in Japan, killing 64 of 72 people on board.
  - In an interview with London Evening Standard reporter Maureen Cleave, John Lennon of the Beatles states: "We're more popular than Jesus now."
- March 5
  - BOAC Flight 911 crashes in severe clear-air turbulence over Mount Fuji soon after taking off from Tokyo International Airport in Japan, killing all 124 people on board.
  - Merci, Chérie by Udo Jürgens (music by Udo Jürgens, lyrics by Jürgens and Thomas Hörbiger) wins the Eurovision Song Contest 1966 (staged in Luxembourg) for Austria.
- March 7 – Charles de Gaulle asks U.S. President Lyndon B. Johnson for negotiations about the state of NATO equipment in France.
- March 8
  - Anti-communist demonstrations occur at the Indonesian Foreign Ministry.
  - Vietnam War: The U.S. announces it will substantially increase the number of its troops in Vietnam.
  - Nelson's Pillar in O'Connell Street, Dublin, is clandestinely blown up by former Irish Republican Army volunteers marking this year's 50th anniversary of the Easter Rising.
- March 10 – Crown Princess Beatrix of the Netherlands marries Claus von Amsberg. Some spectators demonstrate against the groom because he is German.
- March 11
  - Transition to the New Order in Indonesia: President Sukarno gives all executive powers to General Suharto by signing the Supersemar order.
  - French President Charles de Gaulle states that French troops will be taken out of NATO and that all French NATO bases and headquarters must be closed within a year.
- March 16 – NASA spacecraft Gemini 8 (David Scott, Neil Armstrong) conducts the first docking in space, with an Agena target vehicle.
- March 20 – Football's FIFA World Cup Trophy is stolen while on exhibition in London; it is found seven days later by a mongrel dog named "Pickles" and his owner David Corbett, wrapped in newspaper in a south London garden.
- March 22 – in the Chinese city of Xingtai a magnitude 6.8 earthquake leaves more than 8,000 dead and 38,000 injured.
- March 24 – Pope Paul VI meets Michael Ramsey, the Archbishop of Canterbury, in Rome, and gives him an episcopal ring.
- March 26 – Demonstrations are held across the United States against the Vietnam War.
- March 28 – Cevdet Sunay becomes the fifth president of Turkey.
- March 29 – The 23rd Congress of the Communist Party of the Soviet Union is held: Leonid Brezhnev demands that U.S. troops leave Vietnam, and announces that Chinese-Soviet relations are not satisfactory.
- March 31
  - The British Labour Party led by Harold Wilson wins the 1966 United Kingdom general election, gaining a 96-seat majority (compared with a single seat majority when the election was called on February 28).
  - The Soviet Union launches Luna 10, which becomes the first space probe to enter orbit around the Moon.

=== April ===
- April 2 – The Indonesian army demands that the country rejoin the United Nations.
- April 3 – Luna 10 is the first manmade object to enter lunar orbit.
- April 5 – During the Buddhist Uprising, South Vietnamese military prime minister Nguyễn Cao Kỳ personally attempts to lead the capture of the restive city of Đà Nẵng before backing down.
- April 7 – The United Kingdom asks the United Nations Security Council for authority to use force to stop oil tankers that violate the embargo against Rhodesia (authority is given April 10).
- April 8
  - Buddhists in South Vietnam protest against the fact that the new government has not set a date for free elections.
  - Leonid Brezhnev becomes General Secretary of the Soviet Union, as well as Leader of the Communist Party of the U.S.S.R.
- April 14
  - Kenyan Vice President Oginga Odinga resigns, saying "invisible government" representing foreign interests now runs the country. He will head a new party, the Kenya People's Union.
  - The South Vietnamese government promises free elections in 3–5 months.
- April 15 – An anti-Nasser conspiracy is exposed in Egypt.
- April 18
  - China declares that it will stop economic aid to Indonesia.
  - The 38th Academy Awards ceremony is held in Santa Monica, California: The Sound of Music wins Best Picture.
- April 19 – Moors murders: Ian Brady and Myra Hindley go on trial at Chester Crown Court in north west England for the murders of 3 children who vanished between November 1963 and October 1965.
- April 21
  - An artificial heart is installed in the chest of Marcel DeRudder in a Houston, Texas, hospital.
  - The opening of the Parliament of the United Kingdom is televised for the first time.
  - Haile Selassie visits Jamaica for the first time, meeting with Rasta leaders.
- April 24 – Uniform daylight saving time is first observed in most parts of North America.
- April 26
  - A new government is formed in the Republic of the Congo, led by Ambroise Noumazalaye.
  - The magnitude 5.1 Tashkent earthquake affects the largest city in Soviet Central Asia with a maximum MSK intensity of VII (Very strong). Tashkent is mostly destroyed and 15–200 are killed.
- April 27 – Pope Paul VI and Soviet Foreign Minister Andrei Gromyko meet in the Vatican (the first meeting between leaders of the Roman Catholic Church and the Soviet Union).
- April 28 – In Rhodesia, security forces kill seven ZANLA men in combat; Chimurenga, the ZANU rebellion, begins.
- April 30 – Regular hovercraft service begins over the English Channel (discontinued in 2000).

=== May ===
May 26: Guyana becomes independent

- May 4
  - Fiat signs a contract with the Soviet government to build a car factory in the Soviet Union.
  - May 1966 lunar eclipse: A penumbral lunar eclipse takes place, the 64th lunar eclipse of Lunar Saros 111.
- May 5 – The Montreal Canadiens defeat the Detroit Red Wings to win the Stanley Cup in ice hockey.
- May 6 – The Moors murders trial ends in the UK with Ian Brady being found guilty on all three counts of murder and sentenced to three concurrent terms of life imprisonment. Myra Hindley is convicted on two counts of murder and of being an accessory in the third murder committed by Brady, receiving two concurrent terms of life imprisonment and a seven-year fixed term for being an accessory.
- May 7 – Irish bank workers go on strike.
- May 12
  - African members of the UN Security Council say that the British army should blockade Rhodesia.
  - Radio Peking claims that U.S. planes have shot down a Chinese plane over Yunnan (the U.S. denies the story the next day).
- May 14 – Turkey and Greece intend to start negotiations about the situation in Cyprus.
- May 15
  - Indonesia asks Malaysia for peace negotiations.
  - The South Vietnamese army besieges Da Nang.
  - Tens of thousands of anti-war demonstrators again picket the White House, then rally at the Washington Monument.
- May 16
  - The Chinese Communist Party issues the 'May 16 Notice', marking the beginning of the Cultural Revolution.
  - A strike is called by the National Union of Seamen in the United Kingdom.
  - In New York City, Dr. Martin Luther King Jr. makes his first public speech on the Vietnam War.
  - The Beach Boys releases the album Pet Sounds.
- May 19 – Gertrude Baniszewski is found guilty of torturing and murdering 16-year-old Sylvia Likens in Indianapolis, United States, and is sentenced to life in prison (she is released on parole in December 1985).
- May 24
  - Battle of Mengo Hill: Ugandan army troops arrest Mutesa II of Buganda and occupy his palace.
  - The Nigerian government forbids all political activity in the country until January 17, 1969.
- May 25
  - Explorer program: Satellite Explorer 32 (Atmosphere Explorer-B) is launched from the United States.
  - No. 9 Squadron RAAF becomes part of the 4,500 strong Australian Task Force assigned to duties in Vietnam, leaving for Southeast Asia aboard the aircraft carrier HMAS Sydney.
- May 26 – British Guiana achieves independence from the United Kingdom, becoming Guyana.
- May 28
  - Fidel Castro declares martial law in Cuba because of a possible U.S. attack.
  - The Indonesian and Malaysian governments declare that the Indonesia–Malaysia confrontation is over (a treaty is signed on August 11).
  - Boat ride It's a Small World opens at Disneyland.
- May 29 – Sports stadium Estadio Azteca officially opens in Mexico City in advance of the 1968 Summer Olympics.
- May 31 – The Philippines reestablishes diplomatic relations with Malaysia.

=== June ===
- June 2
  - Éamon de Valera is re-elected as Irish president, aged 84.
  - Joaquín Balaguer is elected president of the Dominican Republic.
  - Surveyor program: Surveyor 1 lands in Oceanus Procellarum on the Moon, becoming the first U.S. spacecraft to soft-land on another world.
  - Four former cabinet ministers including Évariste Kimba are executed in the Democratic Republic of the Congo for alleged involvement in a plot to kill Mobutu Sese Seko.
- June 5 – Gemini 9A: Gene Cernan completes the second U.S. spacewalk (2 hours, 7 minutes).
- June 6 – Civil rights activist James Meredith is shot by a sniper while traversing Mississippi in the March Against Fear.
- June 8
  - A North American XB-70 Valkyrie strategic bomber prototype is destroyed in a mid-air collision with an F-104 Starfighter chase plane during a photo shoot. NASA pilot Joseph A. Walker and USAF test pilot Carl Cross are both killed.
  - 1966 Topeka tornado: Topeka, Kansas, is devastated by a tornado that registers as an "F5" on the Fujita scale, the first to exceed US$100 million in damages. Sixteen people are killed, hundreds more injured and thousands of homes damaged or destroyed, and the campus of Washburn University suffers catastrophic damage.
- June 12 – Chicago's Division Street riots begin in response to police shooting of a young Puerto Rican man.
- June 13 – Miranda v. Arizona: The Supreme Court of the United States rules that the police must inform suspects of their rights before questioning them.
- June 14 – The Vatican abolishes the Index Librorum Prohibitorum.
- June 17 – An Air France personnel strike begins.
- June 18 – CIA chief William Raborn resigns; Richard Helms becomes his successor.
- June 28 – Argentine Revolution: In Argentina, a military junta calling itself Revolución Argentina deposes president Arturo Umberto Illia in a coup and appoints General Juan Carlos Onganía to power.
- June 29
  - Vietnam War: U.S. planes begin bombing Hanoi and Haiphong.
  - The strike by the National Union of Seamen in the United Kingdom is called off.
- June 30
  - France formally leaves the military structure of NATO.
  - The National Organization for Women (NOW) is founded in Washington, D.C.
  - Australia's semi-decennial census took place.

=== July ===
- July 1 – Joaquín Balaguer becomes president of the Dominican Republic.
- July 3
  - 31 people are arrested when a demonstration by approximately 4,000 anti-Vietnam War protesters in front of the United States Embassy in London in Grosvenor Square turns violent.
  - René Barrientos is elected President of Bolivia.
- July 6 – Malawi becomes a republic.
- July 7 – A Warsaw Pact conference ends with a promise to support North Vietnam.
- July 8 – King Mwambutsa IV Bangiriceng of Burundi is deposed by his son Ntare V, who is in turn deposed by prime minister Michel Micombero.
- July 11 – The 1966 FIFA World Cup begins in England.
- July 12 – Zambia threatens to leave the Commonwealth of Nations because of British peace overtures to Rhodesia.
- July 13 – In Chicago, United States, Richard Speck breaks into a nurses' dormitory and murders eight of the nine student nurses who live there.
- July 14
  - Israeli and Syrian jet fighters clash over the Jordan River.
  - Gwynfor Evans, President of Plaid Cymru, the Welsh nationalist party, becomes Member of the United Kingdom Parliament for Carmarthen, taking the previously Labour-held Welsh seat at a by-election with a majority of 2,435 on an 18% swing and giving his party its first representation at Westminster in its forty-one year history.
- July 18
  - Gemini 10 (John Young, Michael Collins) is launched from the United States. After docking with an Agena target vehicle, the astronauts set a world altitude record of 474 miles (763 km).
  - The International Court of Justice rules in favour of South Africa in a case on the administration of South West Africa which has been brought before them by Ethiopia and Liberia.
- July 22 – Following the death of Hsu Tsu-tsai, a visiting engineer, in The Hague under suspicious circumstances, the Chinese government declares Dutch diplomat G. J. Jongejans persona non grata, but tells him not to leave China before Hsu's Chinese associates have been permitted to leave the Netherlands.
- July 23 – Katangese troops in Stanleyville, Congo, revolt for several weeks in support of the exiled minister Moise Tshombe.
- July 24
  - U.N. Secretary General U Thant visits Moscow.
  - A USAF F-4C Phantom #63-7599 is shot down by a North Vietnamese SAM-2 45 miles (72 km) northeast of Hanoi, the first loss of a U.S. aircraft to a Vietnamese surface-to-air missile in the Vietnam War.
- July 26 – Lord Gardiner issues the Practice Statement in the House of Lords of the United Kingdom, stating that the House, when acting in a judicial capacity, is not bound to follow its own previous precedent.
- July 28 – The U.S. announces that a Lockheed U-2 reconnaissance plane has disappeared over Cuba.
- July 29
  - 1966 Nigerian counter-coup: Army officers from the north of Nigeria execute head of state General Aguiyi-Ironsi and install Yakubu Gowon.
  - La Noche de los Bastones Largos: Junta takes over Argentine universities.
  - Bob Dylan is injured in a motorcycle accident near his home in Woodstock, New York. He is not seen in public for over a year.
- July 30 – England beats West Germany 4–2 to win the 1966 FIFA World Cup at Wembley after extra time.
- July 31 – Loss of MV Darlwyne: a pleasure cruiser disappears off the Cornwall coast of England with the loss of all 31 aboard.

=== August ===
- August 1
  - Sniper Charles Whitman kills 15 people and wounds 31 from roof of the University of Texas at Austin Main Building tower in the United States, after earlier killing his wife and mother.
  - The British Colonial Office merges with the Commonwealth Relations Office to form a new Commonwealth Office.
- August 5
  - The Caesars Palace hotel and casino opens in Las Vegas, United States.
  - the Beatles releases the album Revolver, in the UK.
- August 6
  - Braniff International Airways Flight 250 crashes in Falls City, Nebraska, United States, killing all 42 of those on board.
  - René Barrientos takes office as the President of Bolivia.
  - The Salazar Bridge (later the 25 de Abril Bridge) opens in Lisbon, Portugal.
- August 10 – Lunar Orbiter 1, the first U.S. spacecraft to orbit the Moon, is launched.
- August 11
  - Indonesia and Malaysia issue a joint peace declaration, formally ending the Indonesia–Malaysia confrontation which began in 1963.
  - the Beatles hold a press conference in Chicago, during which John Lennon apologizes for his "more popular than Jesus" remark, saying, "I didn't mean it as a lousy anti-religious thing."
- August 12 – Massacre of Braybrook Street: Harry Roberts, John Duddy and Jack Witney shoot dead 3 plainclothes policemen in London; they are later sentenced to life imprisonment.
- August 15 – Syrian and Israeli troops clash over Lake Kinneret (also known as the Sea of Galilee) for 3 hours.
- August 17 – Saudi Arabia and the United Arab Republic begin negotiations in Kuwait to end the war in Yemen.
- August 18 – Vietnam War – Battle of Long Tan: D Company, 6th Battalion of the Royal Australian Regiment, meets and defeats a Viet Cong force estimated to be four times larger, in Phuoc Tuy Province, Republic of Vietnam.
- August 19 – The 6.8 M_{w} Varto earthquake affects the town of Varto in eastern Turkey with a maximum Mercalli intensity of IX (Violent), killing at least 2,394–3,000 and injuring at least 1,420.
- August 21 – Seven men are sentenced to death in Egypt for anti-Nasser agitation.
- August 22
  - The Asian Development Bank (ADB) is established.
  - The United Farm Workers Organizing Committee (UFWOC), predecessor of the United Farm Workers of America (UFW), is formed.
- August 26 – The first battle of the South African Air Force and the South African Police with PLAN, the armed wing of the South West Africa People's Organization (SWAPO), takes place at Ongulumbashe during Operation Blue Wildebeest, triggering the South African Border War which continues until 1989.
- August 29 – the Beatles end their U.S. tour with a concert at Candlestick Park in San Francisco. It is their last performance as a live touring band.
- August 30 – France offers independence to French Somaliland (Djibouti from 1977).

=== September ===
September 30: Botswana becomes independent

- September 1
  - United Nations Secretary-General U Thant declares that he will not seek re-election, because U.N. efforts in Vietnam have failed.
  - 98 British tourists die when Britannia Airways Flight 105 crashes in Ljubljana, Yugoslavia.
- September 6 – South African Prime Minister Hendrik Verwoerd is stabbed to death in Parliament by Dimitri Tsafendas.
- September 9 – NATO decides to move Supreme Headquarters Allied Powers Europe to Belgium.
- September 12
  - B. J. Vorster becomes the new Prime Minister of South Africa.
  - Gemini 11 (Charles "Pete" Conrad Jr., Richard F. Gordon Jr) is launched from the United States. The crew performed the first direct-ascent (first orbit) rendezvous with an Agena Target Vehicle, docking with it.
- September 13 – Cultural Revolution in China: Clashes between the Chinese Communist Party and the Red Guards are reported by TASS in the Soviet Union.
- September 16
  - In South Vietnam, Thích Trí Quang ends a 100-day hunger strike.
  - The Metropolitan Opera House opens at Lincoln Center in New York City with the world premiere of Samuel Barber's opera Antony and Cleopatra.
- September 19 – Indonesian military commander (later President) Suharto announces the resumption of Indonesian participation in the United Nations.
- September 29 – Hurricane Inez strikes Hispaniola, leaving thousands dead and tens of thousands homeless in the Dominican Republic and Haiti.
- September 30
  - The Bechuanaland Protectorate in Africa achieves independence from the United Kingdom as Botswana, with Seretse Khama as its first President.
  - Baldur von Schirach and Albert Speer are released from Spandau Prison in West Berlin.

=== October ===
October 4: Lesotho becomes independent

- October 1 – West Coast Airlines Flight 956 crashes with 18 fatal injuries and no survivors 5.5 miles (8.9 km) south of Wemme, Oregon, the first loss of a DC-9.
- October 3 – Tunisia severs diplomatic relations with the United Arab Republic.
- October 4
  - Israel applies for membership in the European Economic Community, which is never granted.
  - Basutoland becomes independent of the United Kingdom and takes the name Lesotho.
- October 5
  - UNESCO signs the Recommendation Concerning the Status of Teachers. This event is to be celebrated as World Teachers' Day.
  - Spain closes its Gibraltar border to vehicular traffic.
  - An experimental breeder reactor at the Enrico Fermi Nuclear Generating Station in Michigan suffers a partial meltdown when its cooling system fails.
- October 6
  - LSD is made illegal in the United States and controlled so strictly that not only are possession and recreational use criminalized, but all legal scientific research programs on the drug in the country are shut down as well.
  - The Love Pageant Rally takes place in the Panhandle of Golden Gate Park (a narrow section that projects into San Francisco's Haight-Ashbury district).
- October 7 – The Soviet Union declares that all Chinese students must leave the country before the end of October.
- October 9 – Vietnam War: Binh Tai Massacre.
- October 11 – France and the Soviet Union sign a treaty for cooperation in nuclear research.
- October 14
  - Closure of Intra Bank begins a crisis in the Lebanese banking system.
  - The city of Montreal inaugurates the Montreal Metro system.
- October 15 – Bobby Seale and Huey P. Newton found the Black Panther Party in the United States.
- October 17 – Lesotho and Botswana are admitted to the United Nations.
- October 21 – Aberfan disaster in South Wales (U.K.): 144 (including 116 children) are killed by a collapsing coal spoil tip.
- October 26
  - NATO decides to move its headquarters from Paris to Brussels.
  - A fire aboard the US aircraft carrier USS Oriskany in the Gulf of Tonkin kills 44 crewmen.
- October 27
  - The United Nations terminates the mandate given by the League of Nations and proclaims that South West Africa will be administrated by the United Nations. This is rejected by South Africa.
  - Walt Disney records his final filmed appearance prior to his death, detailing his plans for EPCOT, a utopian planned city to be built in Florida.

=== November ===
November 30: Barbados becomes independent

- November 2
  - The Cuban Adjustment Act comes into force, allowing 123,000 Cubans the opportunity to apply for permanent residency in the United States.
  - North Korean commandos ambush a UN command control consisting of 2nd Infantry Division soldiers south of the Korean Demilitarized Zone.
- November 4 – 1966 flood of the Arno river in Italy hits Florence, flooding it to a maximum depth of 6.7 m (22 ft), leaving thousands homeless and destroying millions of masterpieces of art and rare books. In addition, a severe tidal flood hits Venice.
- November 5 – Thirty-eight African states demand that the United Kingdom use force against the Rhodesian government.
- November 6 – Lunar Orbiter 2 is launched.
- November 8 – Screen actor Ronald Reagan is elected Governor of California.
- November 10 – Seán Lemass retires as Taoiseach of the Republic of Ireland, to be replaced in the role by fellow Fianna Fáil member Jack Lynch.
- November 11
  - A mine kills three Israeli paratroopers on the West Bank border.
  - Spain declares a general amnesty for crimes committed during the Spanish Civil War, effective only for the Falangists' side.
- November 12 – A total solar eclipse occurs, the 20th solar eclipse of Solar Saros 142.
- November 15 - Gemini 12 (James A. Lovell, Buzz Aldrin) splashes down safely in the Atlantic Ocean, 600 km (370 mi) east of the Bahamas.
- November 17
  - The U.N. General Assembly decides to found the United Nations Industrial Development Organization.
  - A spectacular Leonid meteor shower passes over Arizona, at the rate of 2,300 a minute for 20 minutes.
- November 24 – TABSO Flight 101, from Sofia, Bulgaria, crashes near Bratislava, Czechoslovakia, killing all 82 people on board.
- November 26
  - 1966 Australian federal election: Harold Holt's Liberal/Country Coalition government is re-elected with a significantly increased majority, defeating the Labor Party led by Arthur Calwell. Calwell resigns as Labor leader shortly after; he will be replaced by his deputy and future Prime Minister Gough Whitlam.
  - In the Canadian Football League, the Saskatchewan Roughriders defeat the Ottawa Rough Riders to win the 54th Grey Cup at Vancouver's Empire Stadium 29–14. Saskatchewan are led by quarterback Ron Lancaster.
- November 27 – The Washington Redskins defeat the New York Giants 72–41 in the highest scoring game in National Football League history.
- November 28 – Truman Capote's Black and White Ball ("The Party of the Century") is held in New York City.
- November 29 – The SS Daniel J. Morrell sinks in a storm on Lake Huron, killing 28 of 29 crewmen.
- November 30 – Barbados achieves independence from the United Kingdom.

=== December ===
- December 1
  - Kurt Georg Kiesinger is elected Chancellor of West Germany.
  - British Prime Minister Harold Wilson and Rhodesian Prime minister Ian Smith negotiate aboard HMS Tiger in the Mediterranean.
- December 2 – U Thant agrees to serve a second term as United Nations Secretary General.
- December 3 – Anti-Portuguese demonstrations occur in Macau; a curfew is declared the next day.
- December 5 – The U.S. Supreme Court rules in Bond v. Floyd that the Georgia House of Representatives must seat Julian Bond, having violated his First and Fourteenth Amendment rights.
- December 6 – Vietnam War: Bình Hòa massacre.
- December 7
  - Syria offers weapons to rebels in Jordan.
  - Barbados is admitted to the United Nations.
- December 8 – The Typaldos Line's ferry SS Heraklion sinks in rough seas in the Aegean Sea near Crete, leaving 217 dead.
- December 16
  - The United Nations Security Council approves an oil embargo against Rhodesia.
  - The International Covenant on Economic, Social and Cultural Rights and the International Covenant on Civil and Political Rights are adopted by the General Assembly, as Resolution 2200 A (XXI).
- December 17 – South Africa does not join the trade embargo against Rhodesia.
- December 18 – How the Grinch Stole Christmas, narrated by Boris Karloff, is shown for the first time on CBS in the United States. It becomes a Christmas tradition.
- December 19 – The Asian Development Bank begins operations.
- December 20 – U.K. Prime Minister Harold Wilson withdraws all his previous offers to the Rhodesian government and announces that he will agree to independence for the country only after the establishment of a Black majority government there.
- December 22 – Prime Minister Ian Smith declares that Rhodesia is already a republic.
- December 26 – The first Kwanzaa is celebrated by Maulana Karenga, founder of Organization US (a black nationalist group) and chair of Black Studies at California State University, Long Beach, from 1989 to 2002.
- December 31
  - East German Premier Walter Ulbricht discusses negotiations about German reunification.
  - Eight paintings worth millions of pounds are stolen from Dulwich Picture Gallery in London, but are recovered locally within a week.
  - The Congolese government takes over the Union Minière du Haut Katanga.

=== Date unknown ===
- Lise Meitner and Otto Hahn are awarded the Fermi Prize.
- The Congress of the United States creates the National Council for Marine Resources and Engineering Development.
- The World Buddhist Sangha Council is convened by Theravadins in Sri Lanka, with the hope of bridging differences and working together.
- Long-term potentiation (LTP), the putative cellular mechanism of learning and memory, is first observed by Terje Lømo in Oslo, Norway.
- In or about this year, one person returning to Haiti from the Congo is thought to have first brought HIV to the Americas.

== Births ==
=== January ===
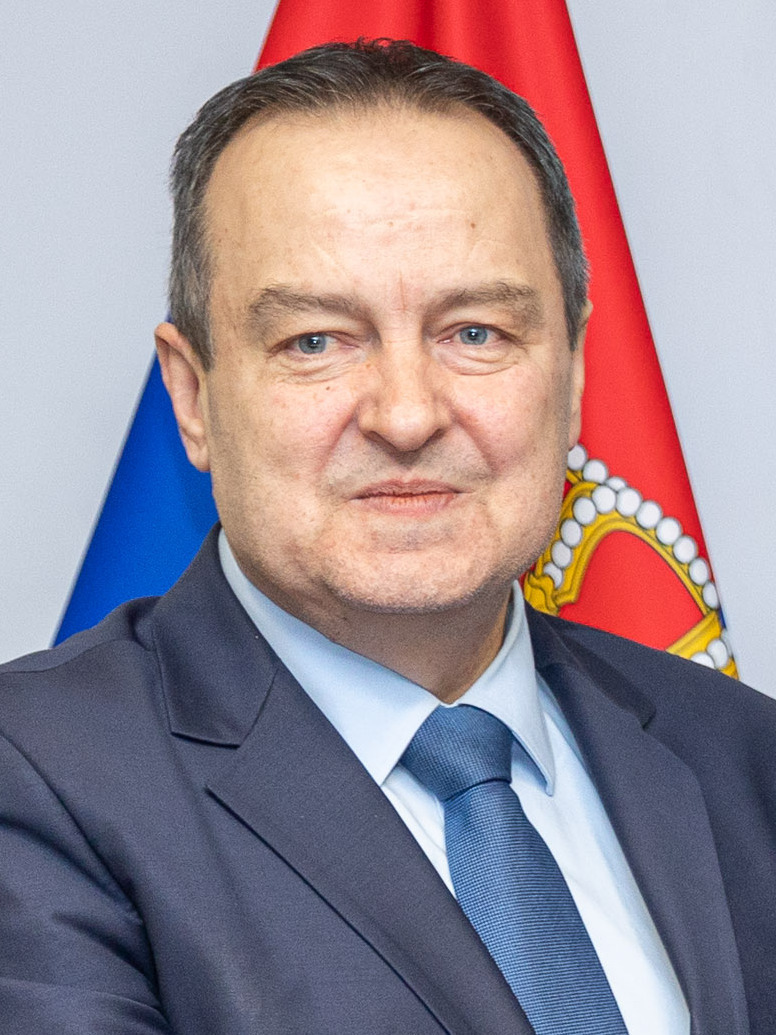
Ivica Dačić

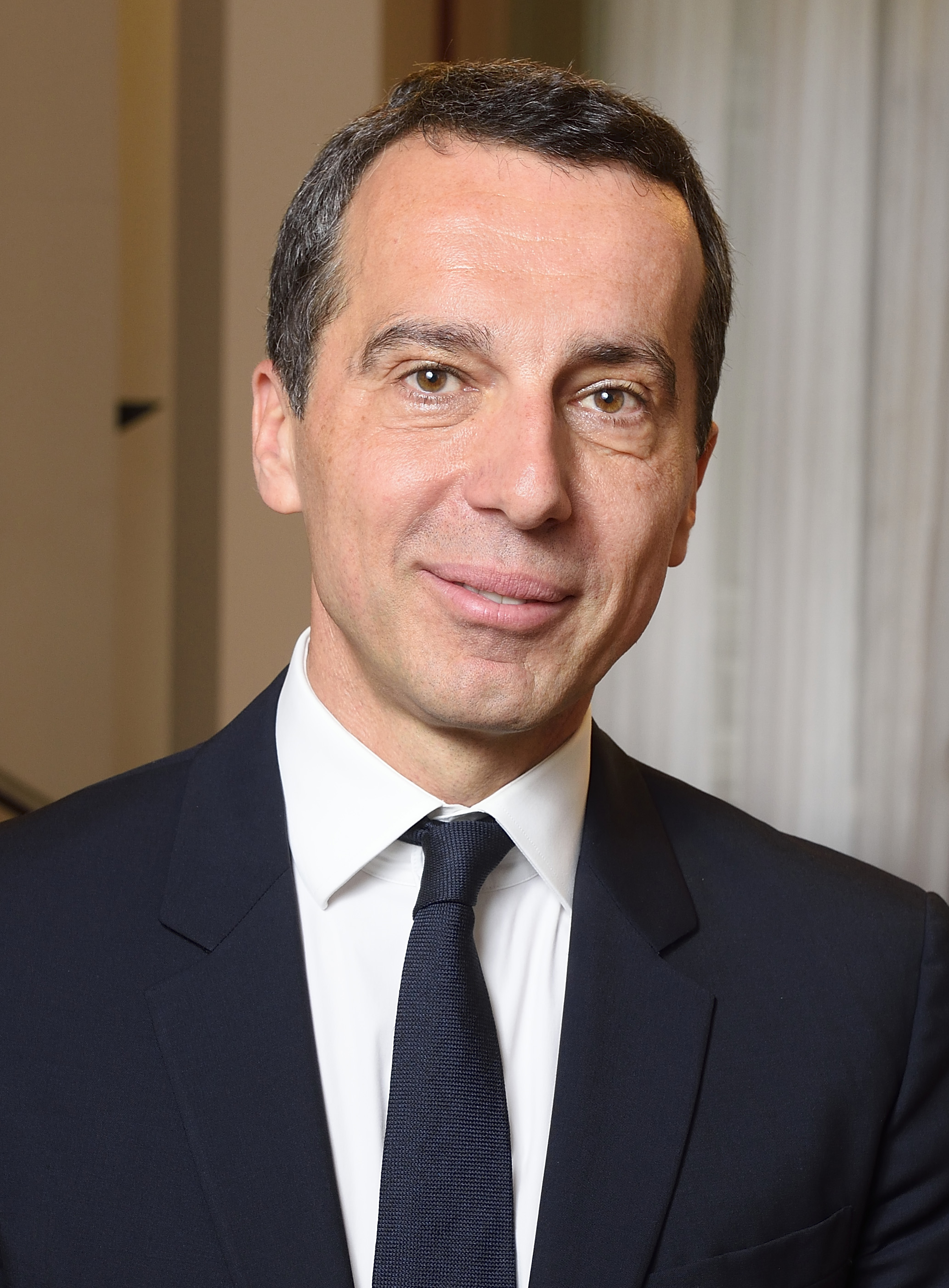
Christian Kern

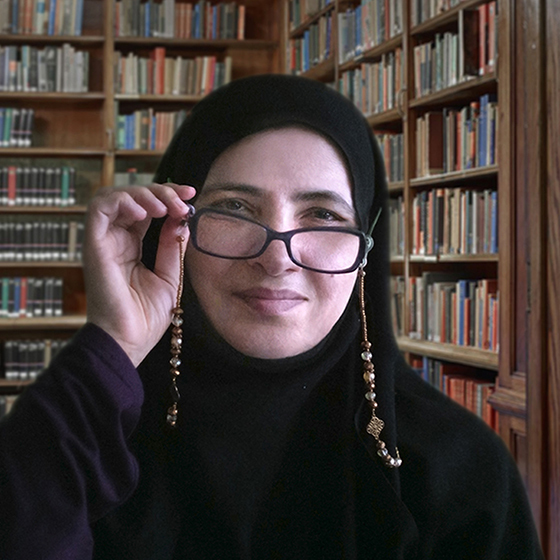
Nadia Maftouni

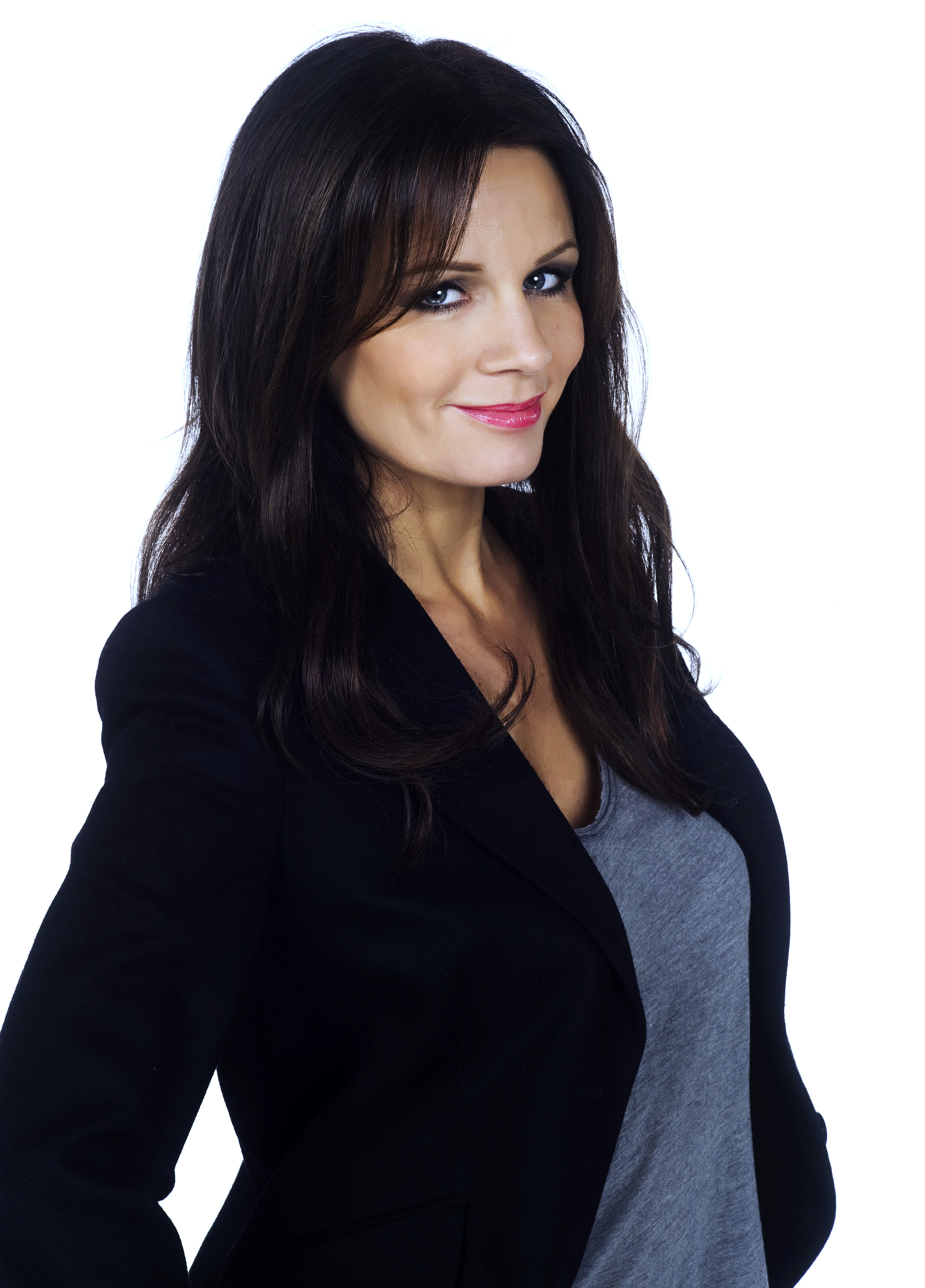
Lena Philipsson

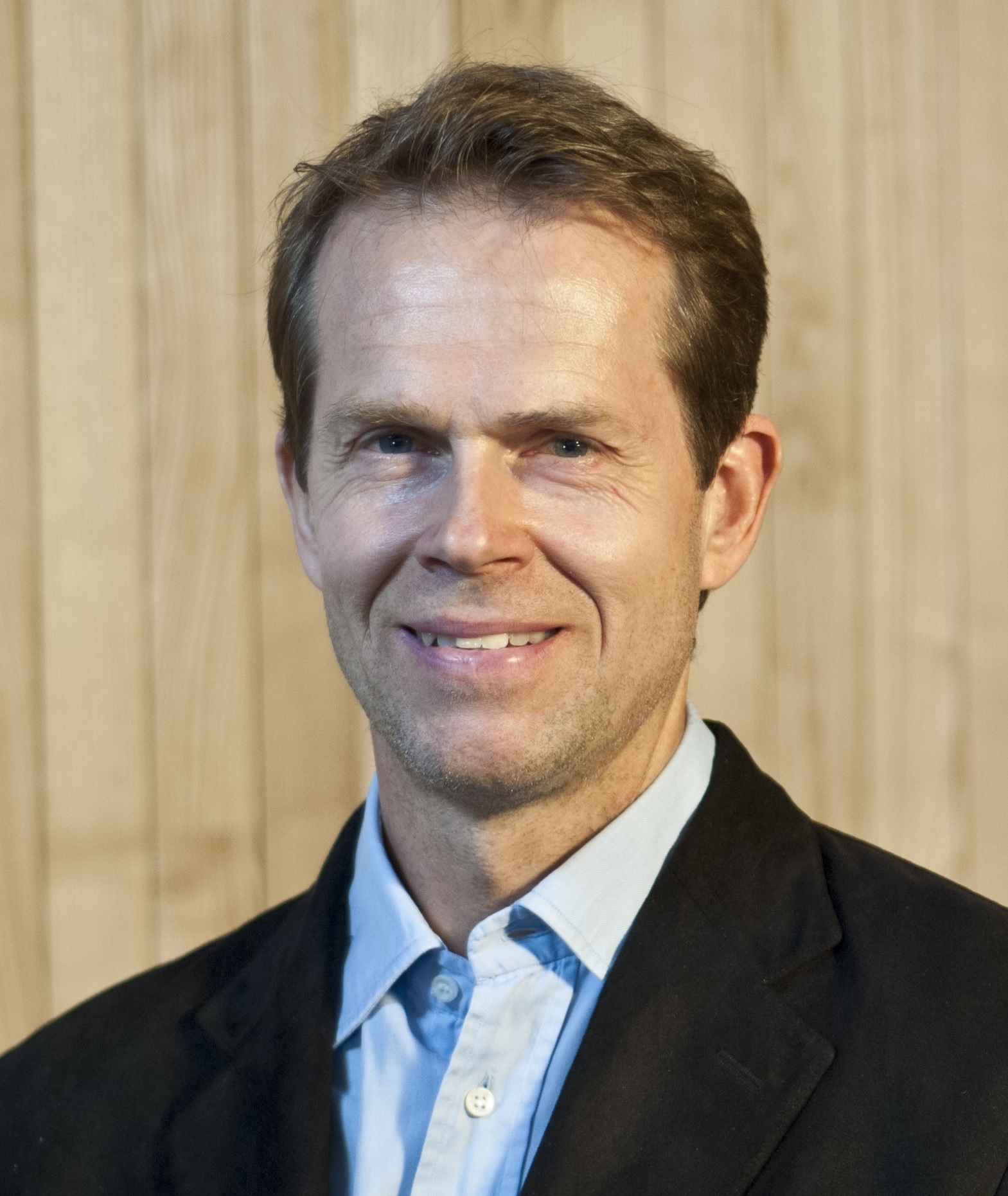
Stefan Edberg

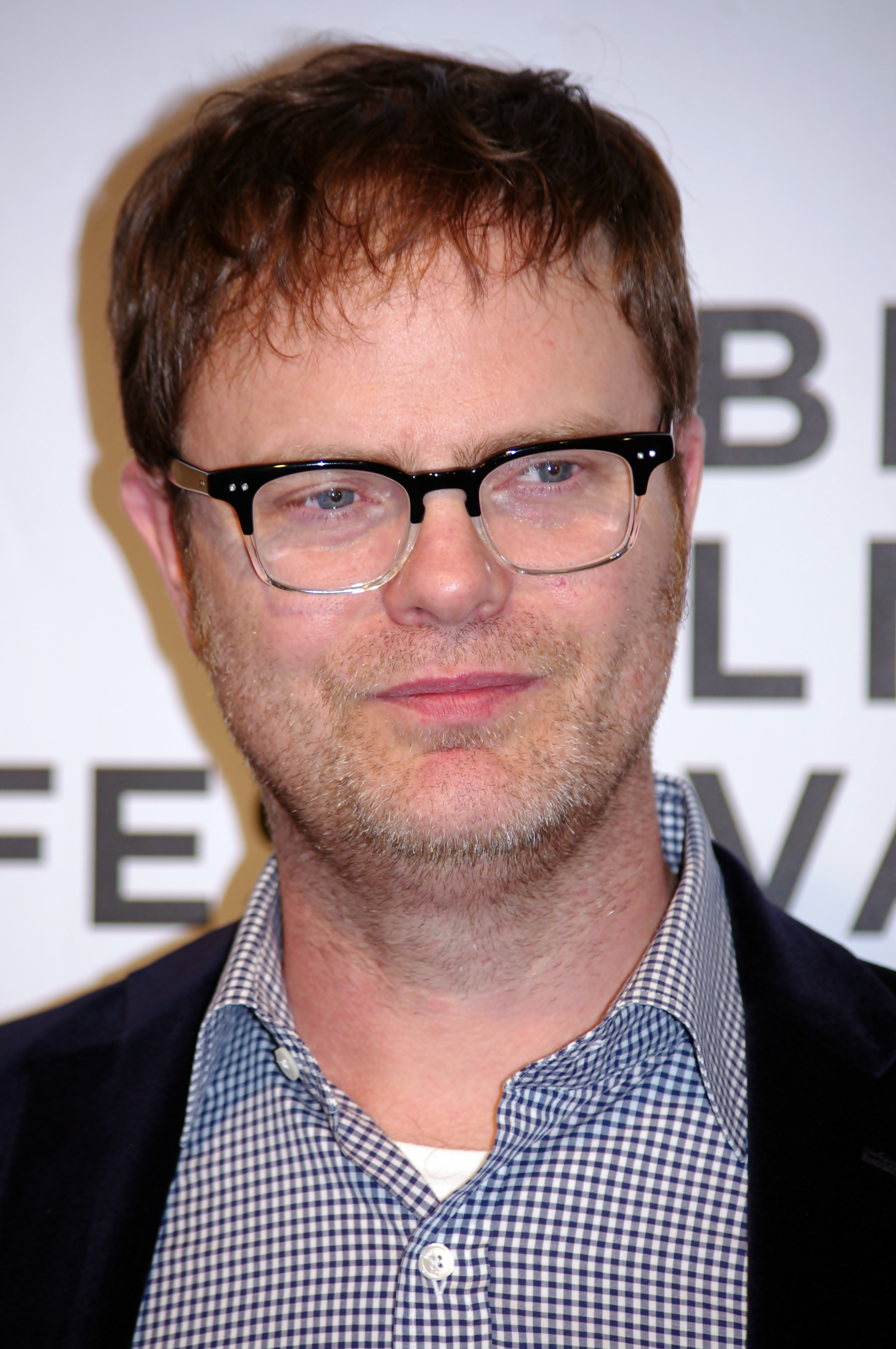
Rainn Wilson

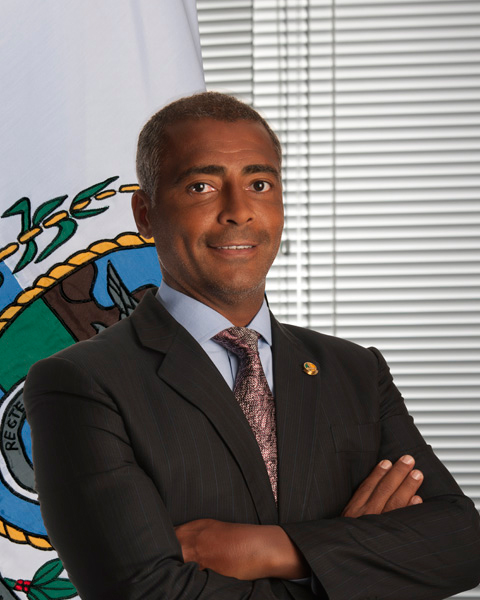
Romário

- January 1 – Ivica Dačić, Serbian politician, Prime Minister of Serbia 2012–2014
- January 4 – Christian Kern, Austrian politician, 24th Chancellor of Austria
- January 6 – Sharon Cuneta, Filipino actress, host and singer
- January 7 – Corrie Sanders, South African boxer (d. 2012)
- January 8
  - Igor Vyazmikin, Russian ice hockey player (d. 2009)
  - Andrew Wood, American musician (d. 1990)
- January 13 – Patrick Dempsey, American actor and race car driver
- January 14
  - Nadia Maftouni, Iranian philosopher
  - Dan Schneider, American television producer, screenwriter and actor
- January 17
  - Shabba Ranks, Jamaican singer
  - Amy Sherman-Palladino, American television writer, director, and producer
- January 19
  - Floris Jan Bovelander, Dutch field-hockey player
  - Stefan Edberg, Swedish tennis player
  - Lena Philipsson, Swedish singer and media personality
- January 20 – Rainn Wilson, American actor, writer and producer
- January 27 – Tamlyn Tomita, Japanese–born American actress
- January 28 – Andrea Berg, German singer
- January 29 – Romário, Brazilian footballer and politician

=== February ===
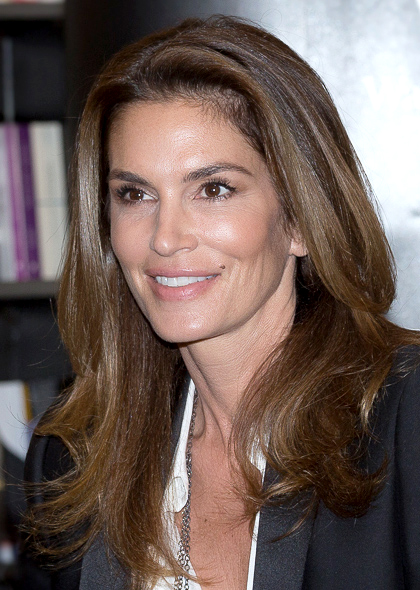
Cindy Crawford

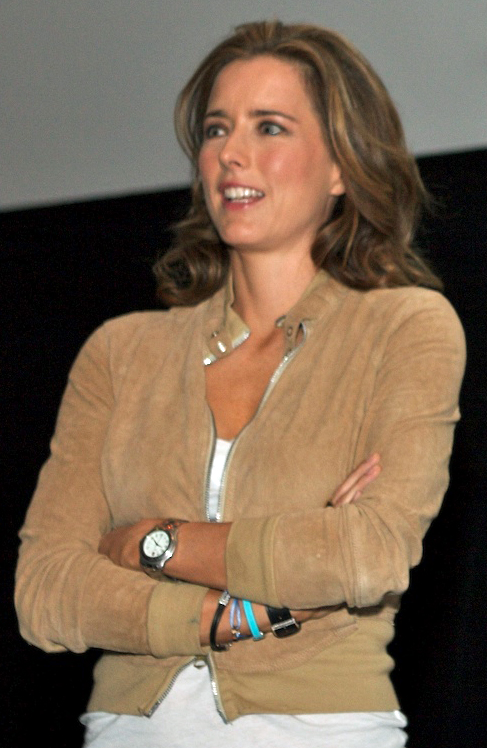
Téa Leoni

- February 1 – Michelle Akers, American footballer
- February 5 – José María Olazábal, Spanish golfer
- February 6 – Rick Astley, British pop singer
- February 7 – Kristin Otto, German swimmer
- February 8 – Hristo Stoichkov, Bulgarian footballer
- February 9 – Ellen van Langen, Dutch athlete
- February 11 – Cristina Elena Grigoraș, Romanian artistic gymnast
- February 13 – Neal McDonough, American actor
- February 17 – Atle Skårdal, Norwegian alpine skier
- February 20 – Cindy Crawford, American model and actress
- February 22 – Rachel Dratch, American actress and comedian
- February 23
  - Alexandre Borges, Brazilian actor
  - Didier Queloz, Swiss-born astronomer, Nobel Prize laureate
- February 24 – Billy Zane, American actor
- February 25
  - Samson Kitur, Kenyan athlete
  - Téa Leoni, American actress
- February 26
  - Jennifer Grant, American actress
  - Najwa Karam, Lebanese singer
- February 28 – Paulo Futre, Portuguese footballer

=== March ===
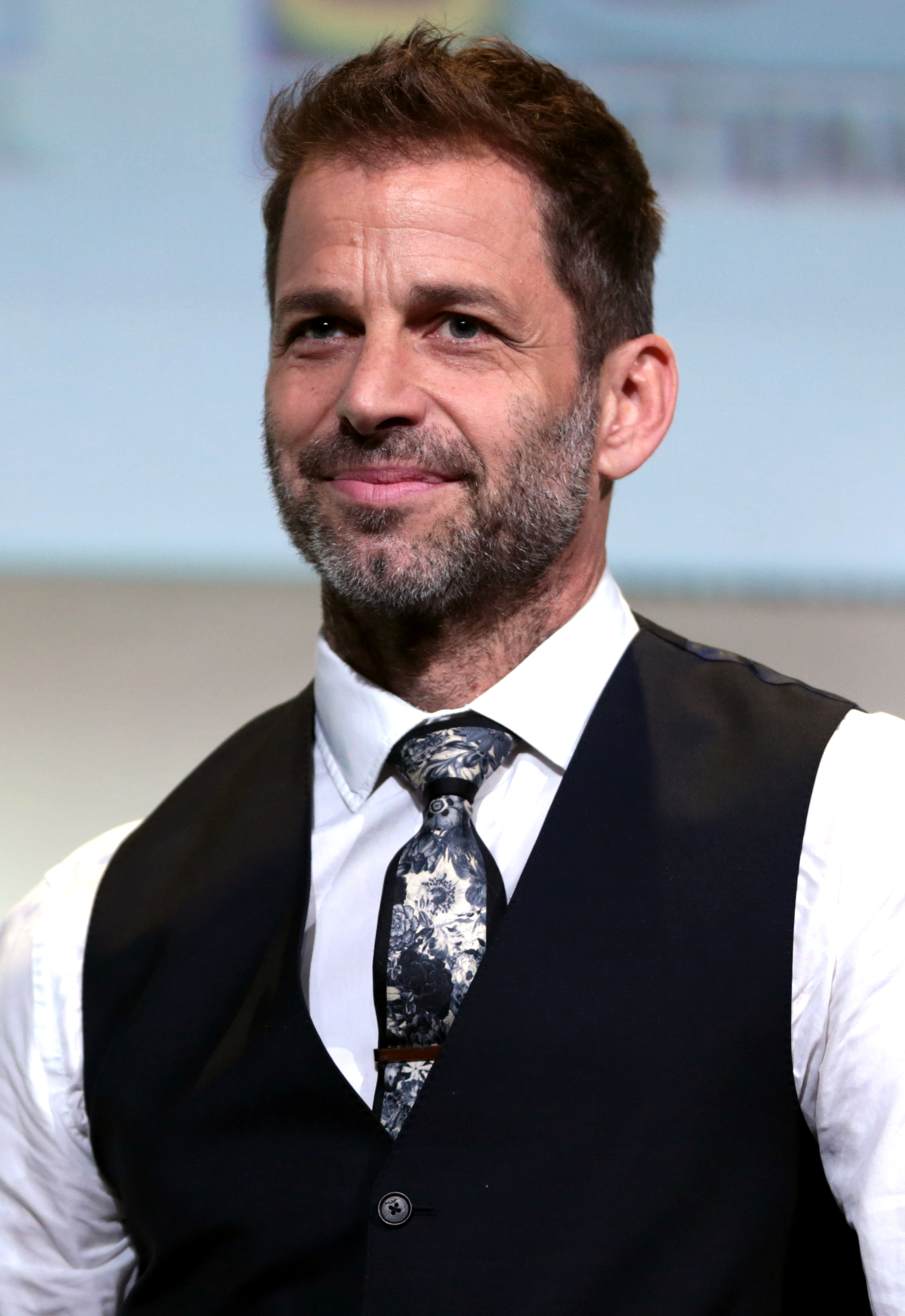
Zack Snyder

- March 1 – Zack Snyder, American actor, film director, screenwriter and producer
- March 2 – Sheren Tang, Hong Kong actress
- March 3
  - Fernando Colunga, Mexican actor
  - Vander Lee, Brazilian singer-songwriter (d. 2016)
  - Tone Lōc, African-American R&B musician
- March 4
  - Kevin Johnson, American basketball player
  - Dav Pilkey, American comic book writer and illustrator
- March 7 – Atsushi Sakurai, Japanese musician (d. 2023)
- March 10 – Edie Brickell, American singer
- March 13 – Chico Science, Brazilian musician (d. 1997)
- March 17 – Espen Hammer, Norwegian philosopher
- March 18 – Jerry Cantrell, American guitarist and singer
- March 21
  - Adam Rudawski, Polish politician, economist, and academic professor
  - DJ Premier, American record producer and DJ
- March 22 – Martha McSally, American politician and military pilot
- March 25
  - Jeff Healey, Canadian guitarist (d. 2008)
  - Remig Stumpf, German cyclist (d. 2019)
- March 26 – Michael Imperioli, American actor
- March 29 – Krasimir Balakov, Bulgarian footballer

=== April ===
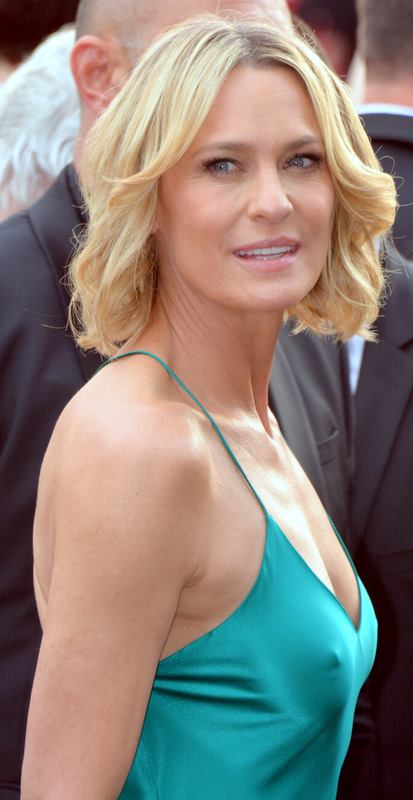
Robin Wright

- April 2 – Teddy Sheringham, British footballer
- April 8
  - Cynthia Nixon, American actress
  - Robin Wright, American actress
- April 11 – Lisa Stansfield, British soul singer
- April 13 – Ali Boumnijel, Tunisian footballer
- April 15 – Samantha Fox, British model and singer
- April 17 – Vikram, Indian actor
- April 18 – Trine Hattestad, Norwegian athlete
- April 20 – David Chalmers, Australian philosopher
- April 22 – Jeffrey Dean Morgan, American actor
- April 26
  - Andrea Temesvári, Hungarian tennis player
  - Natasha Trethewey, Pulitzer Prize–winning poet
- April 27 – Yoshihiro Togashi, Japanese author and illustrator
- April 28 – Ali-Reza Pahlavi, titular prince of Iran (d. 2011)

=== May ===
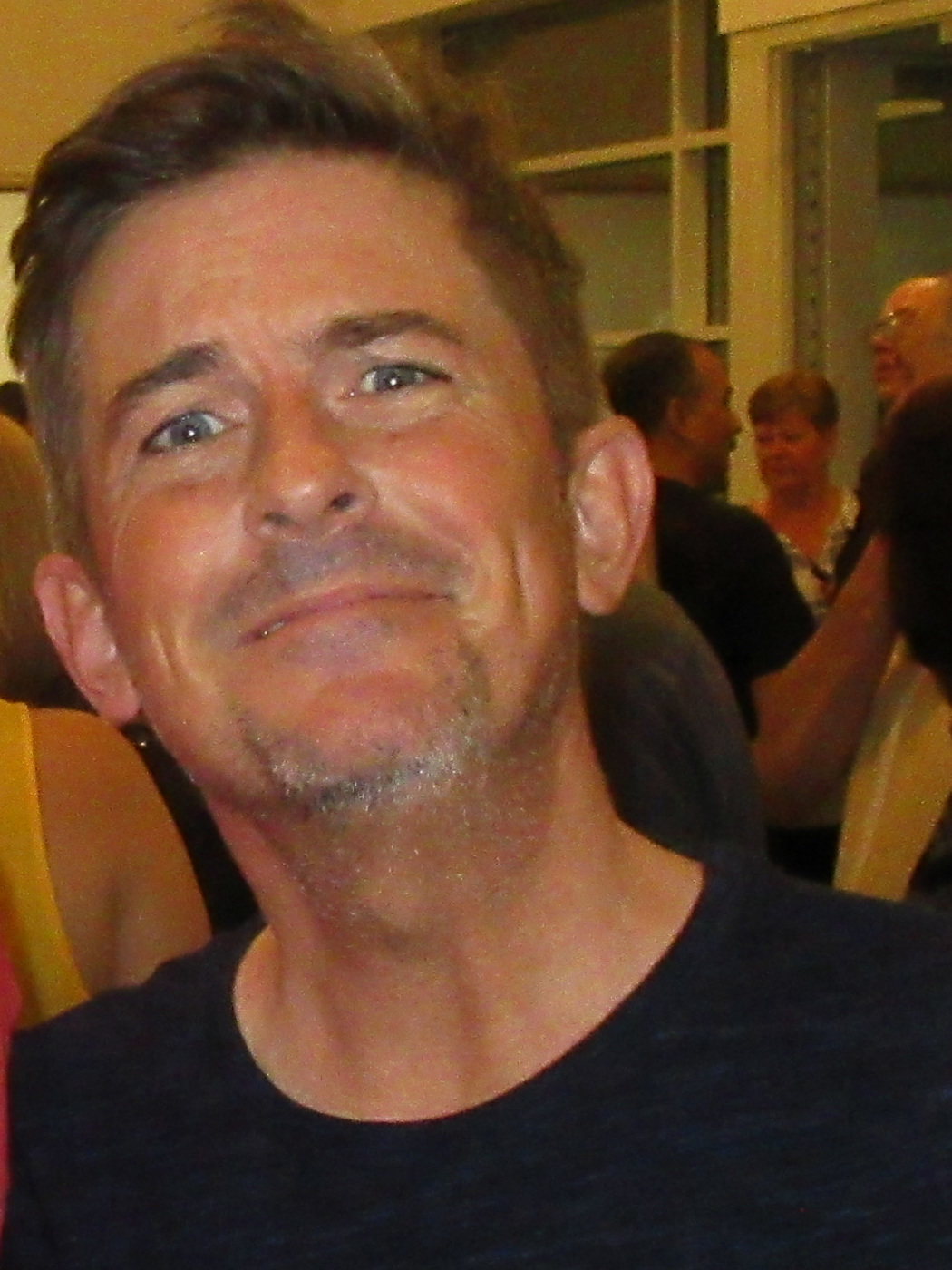
Charlie Schlatter

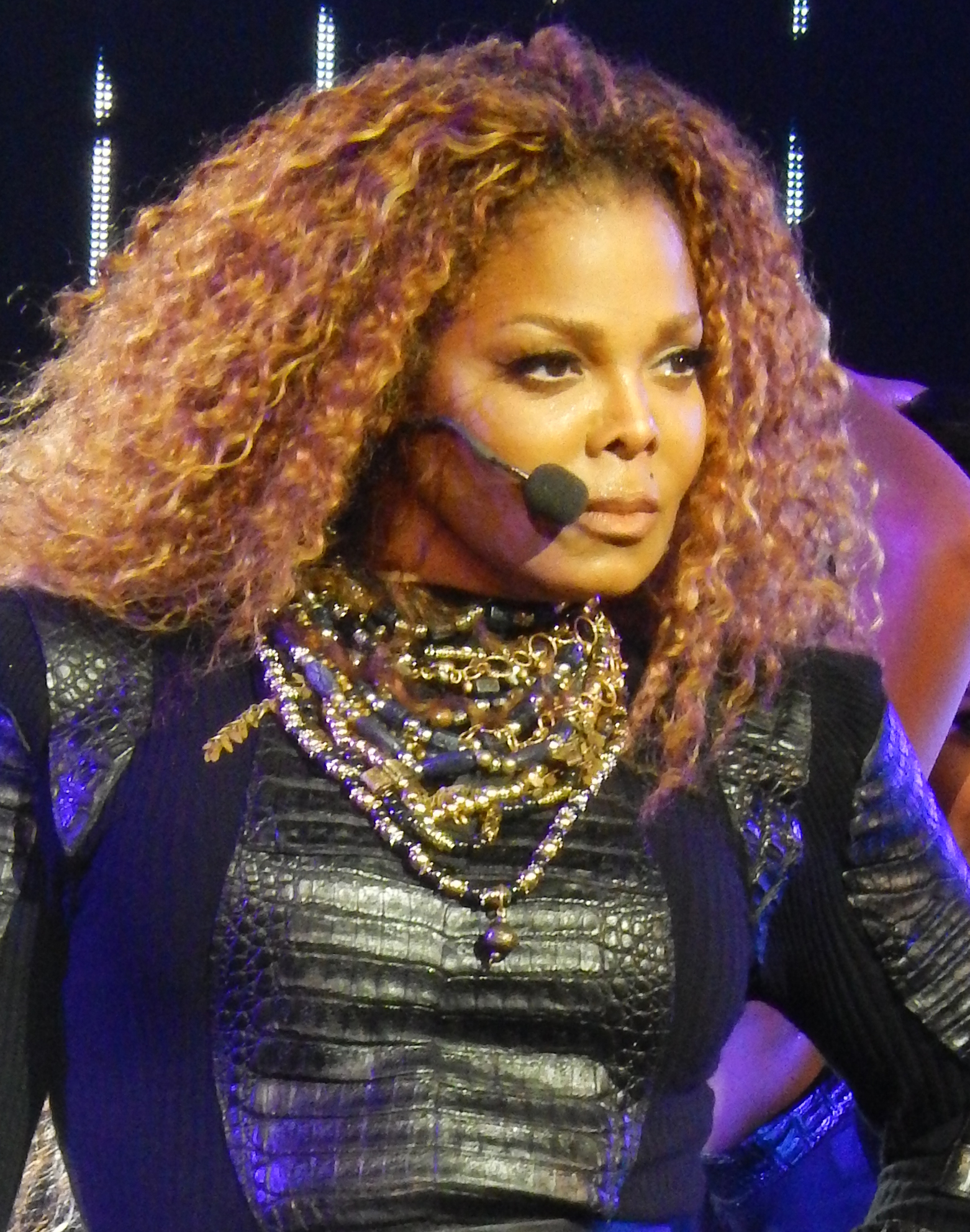
Janet Jackson

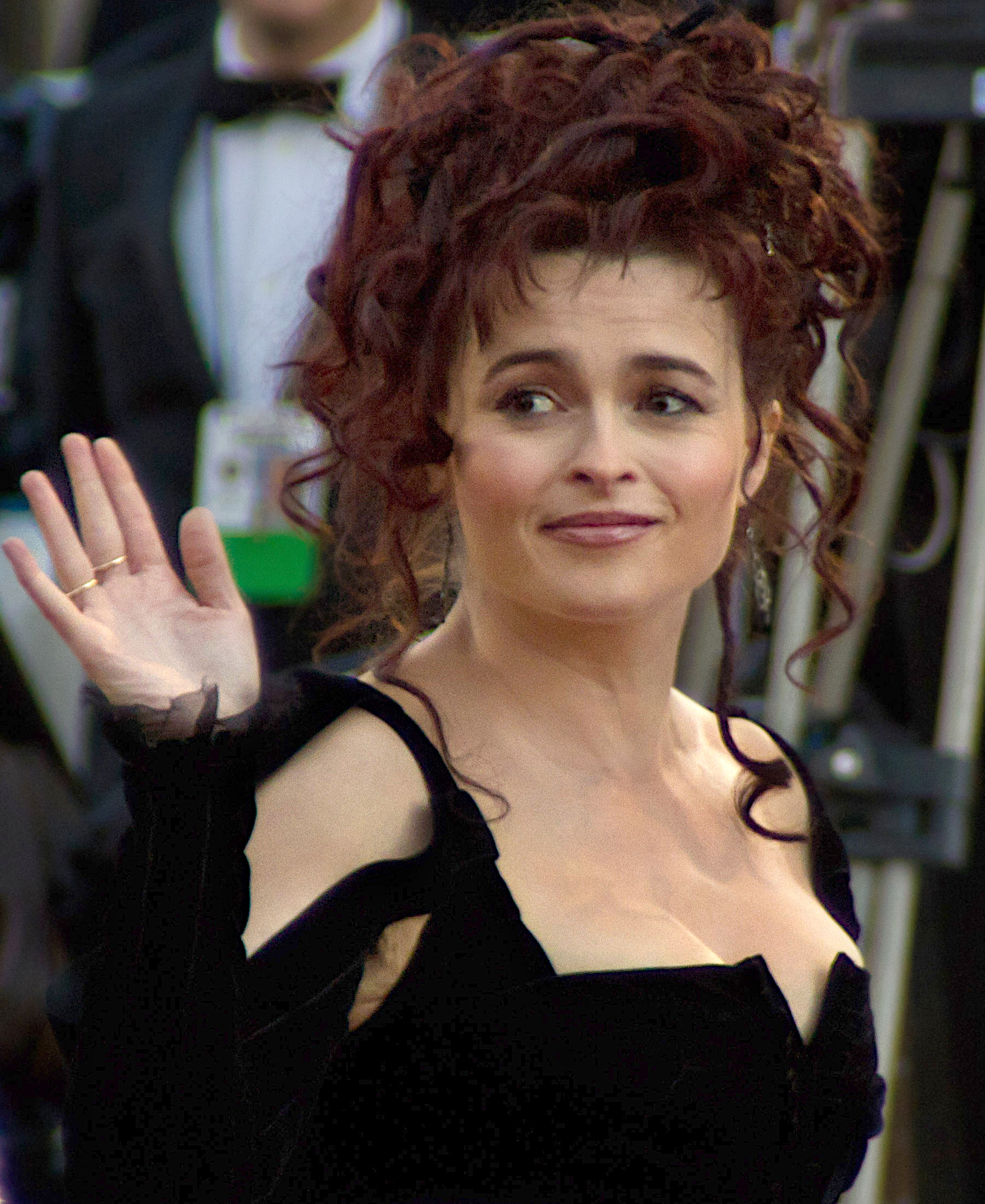
Helena Bonham Carter

- May 3 – Firdous Bamji, Indian-American actor
- May 5 – Lyubov Yegorova, Russian cross-country skier
- May 6
  - Andrea Chiesa, Swiss Formula One driver
  - Cindy Hsu, American Emmy Award-winning journalist
- May 7
  - Anderson Cummins, Canadian cricketer
  - Jes Høgh, Danish footballer
- May 8
  - Robert J. Behnen, American genealogist and politician
  - Kamil Kašťák, Czech ice hockey player
  - Marta Sánchez, Spanish female vocalist, entertainer
  - Cláudio Taffarel, Brazilian goalkeeper
- May 10
  - Jonathan Edwards, British athlete
  - Anne Elvebakk, Norwegian biathlete
  - Genaro Hernández, Mexican-American boxer
- May 12
  - Stephen Baldwin, American actor
  - Bebel Gilberto, Brazilian popular singer
  - Md Mostaqur Rahman, Bangladeshi cost and management accountant, 14th governor of Bangladesh Bank
- May 13
  - Cheryl Dunye, Liberian-born film director, producer, screenwriter, editor and actress
  - Darius Rucker, African-American country singer
- May 15 - Greg Wise, English actor and producer
- May 16
  - Janet Jackson, African-American R&B singer
  - Juan Manuel Funes, Guatemalan footballer and coach
- May 17 – Qusay Hussein, Iraqi politician (d. 2003)
- May 19 – Polly Walker, English actress
- May 21
  - Lisa Edelstein, American actress and playwright
  - François Omam-Biyik, Cameroonian football player
- May 22 – Siri Eftedal, Norwegian team handball player and Olympic medalist
- May 23
  - H. Jon Benjamin, American actor and comedian
  - Graeme Hick, English cricketer
- May 24
  - Eric Cantona, French footballer
  - Francisco Javier Cruz, Mexican football player
- May 25 – Ahmad Reza Abedzadeh, Iranian goalkeeper
- May 26
  - Helena Bonham Carter, English actress
  - Zola Budd, South African athlete
- May 27
  - Heston Blumenthal, British chef
  - Carol Campbell, Afro-German actress, model and presenter
- May 30 – Thomas Häßler, German football player

=== June ===
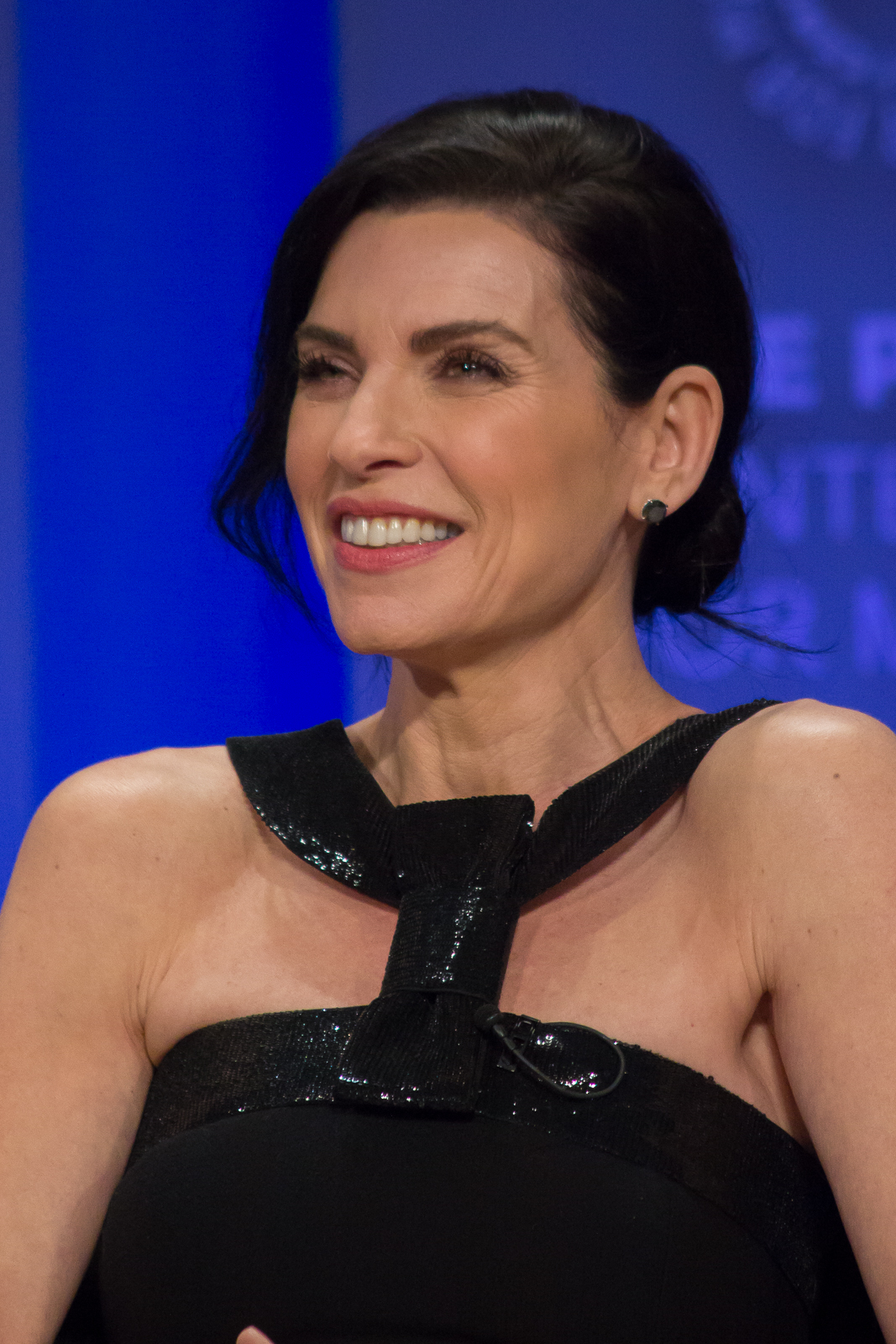
Julianna Margulies

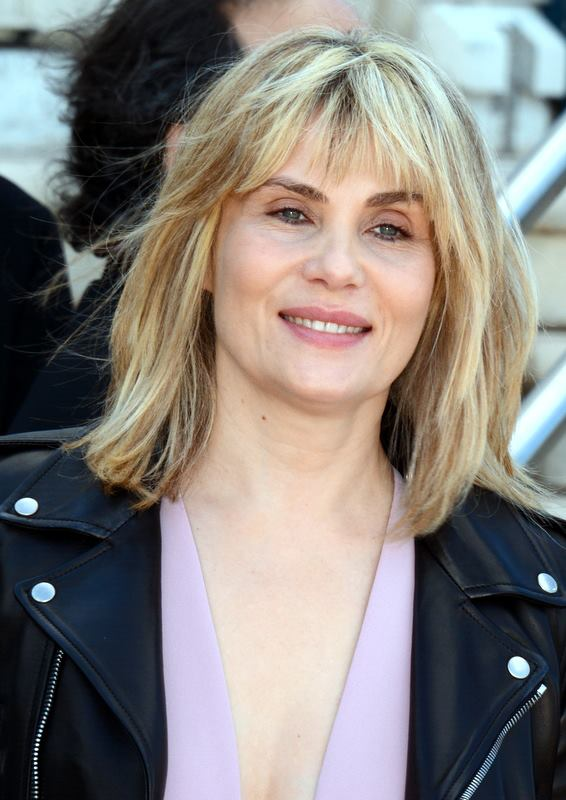
Emmanuelle Seigner

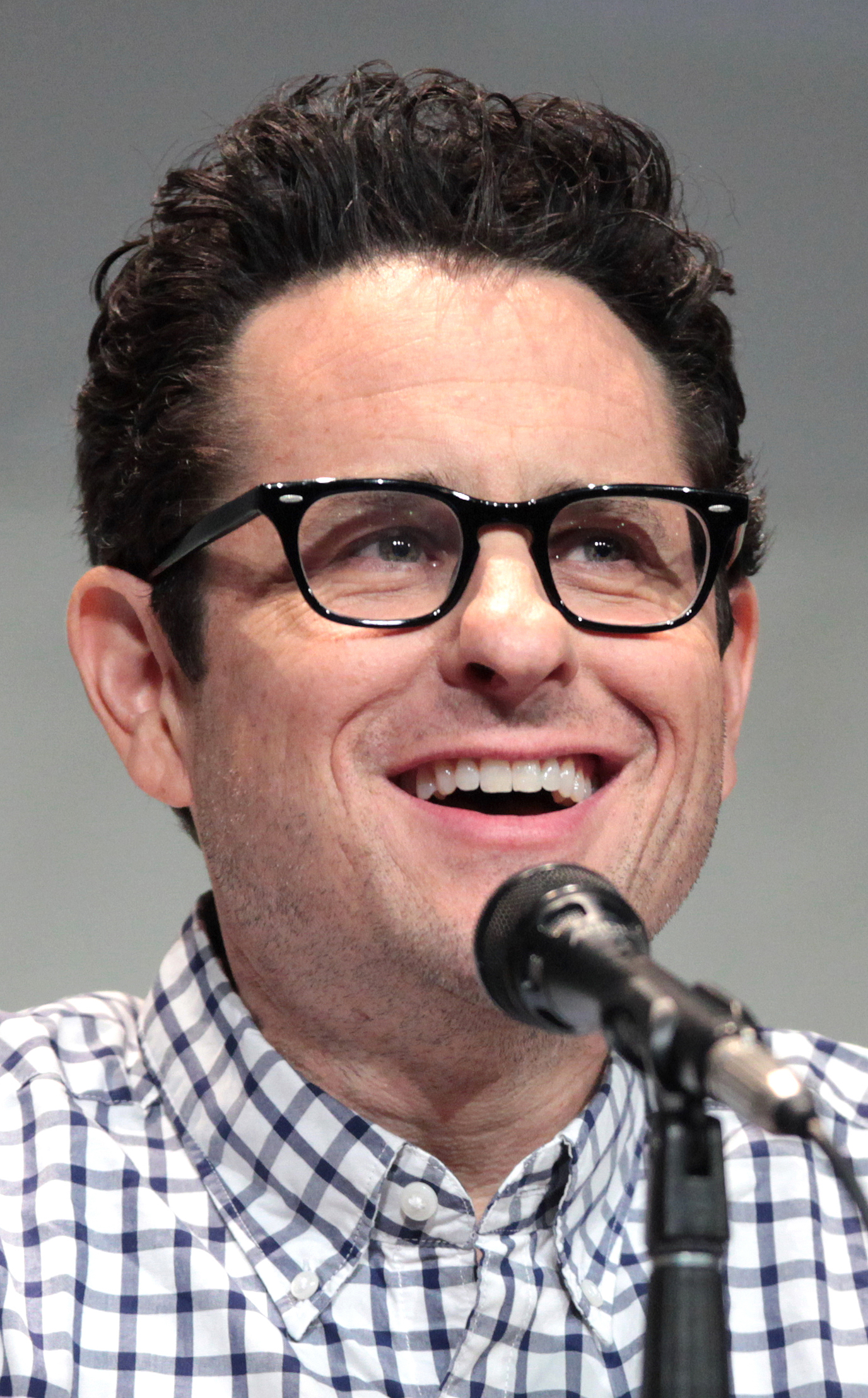
J. J. Abrams

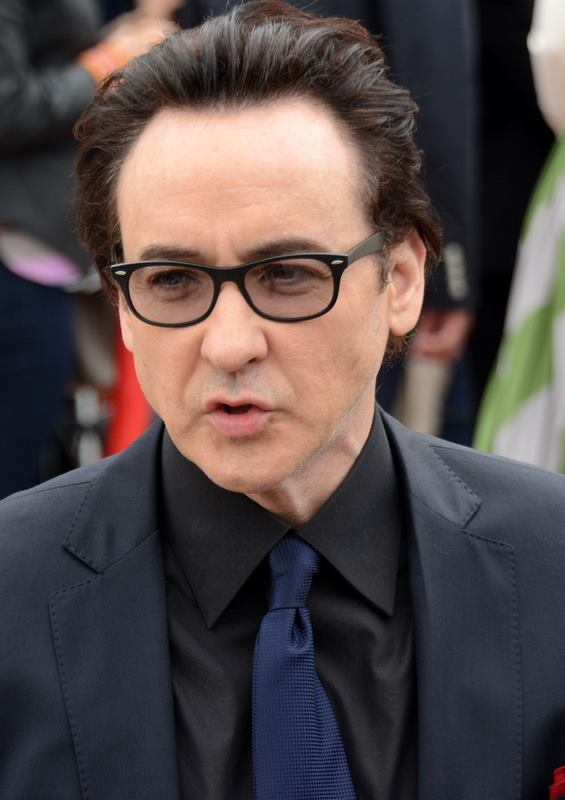
John Cusack

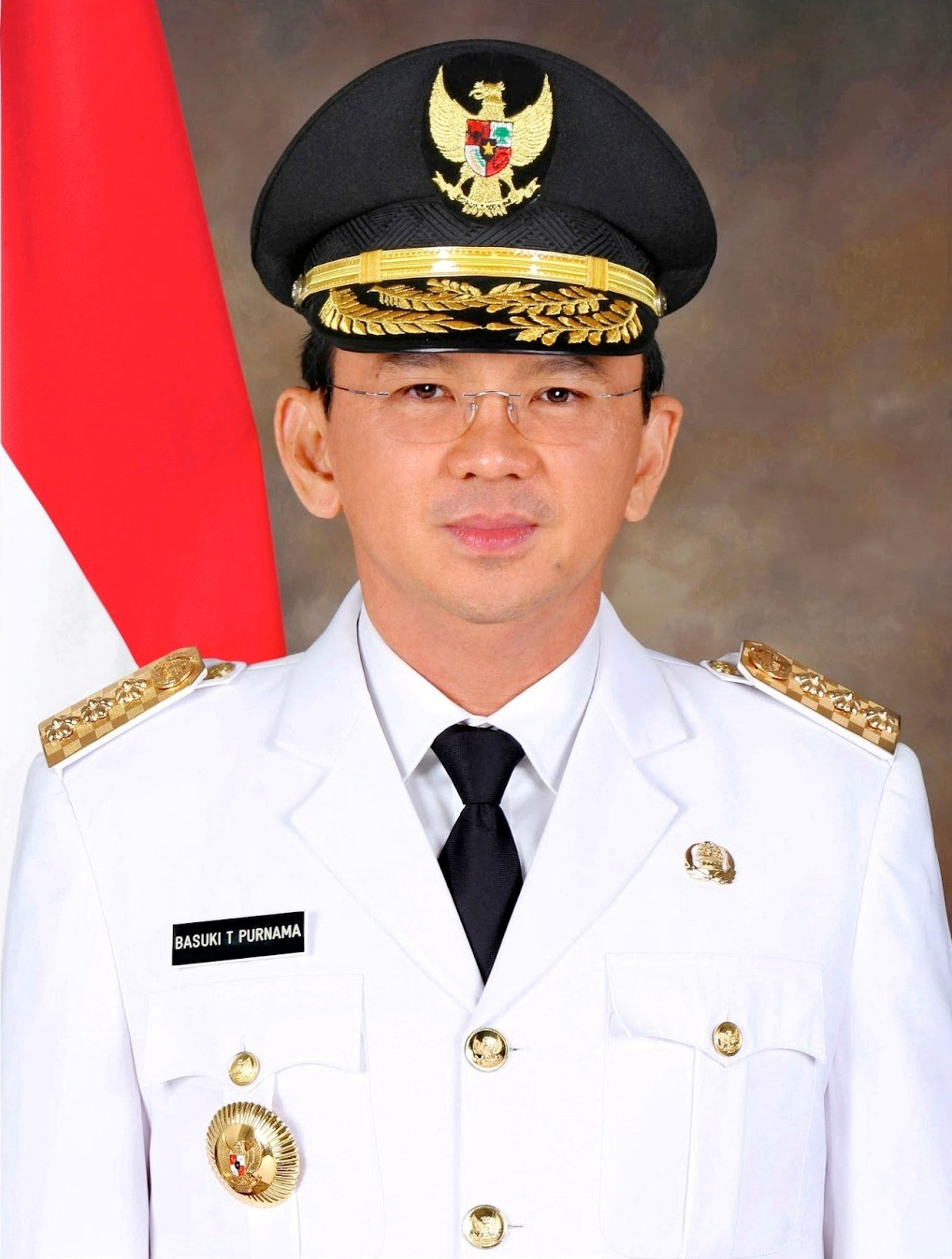
Basuki Tjahaja Purnama

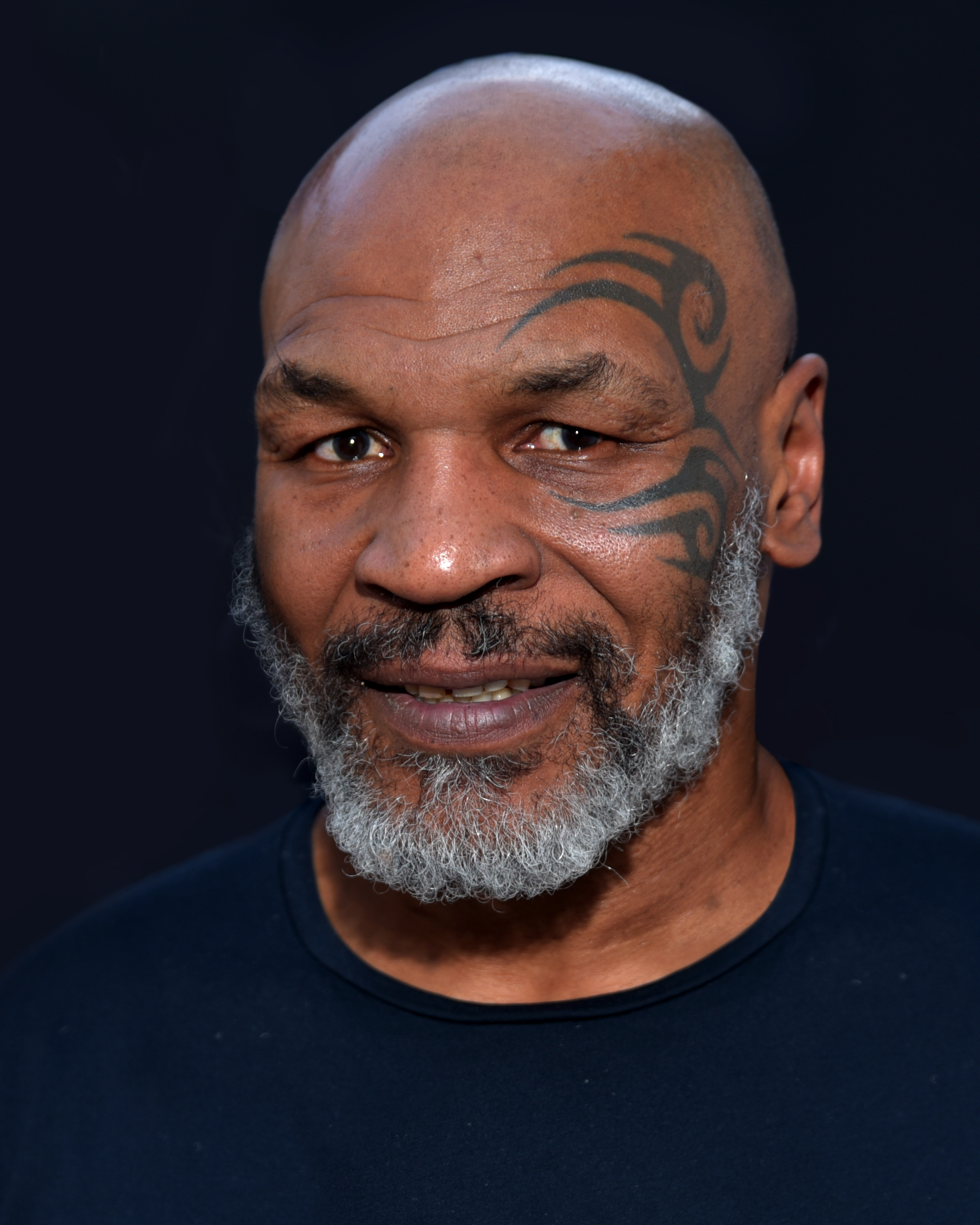
Mike Tyson

- June 3 – Wasim Akram, Pakistani cricketer
- June 4
  - Cecilia Bartoli, Italian mezzo-soprano
  - Svetlana Jitomirskaya, American mathematician
  - Vladimir Voevodsky, Russian mathematician (d. 2017)
- June 6 – Faure Gnassingbé, President of Togo
- June 7 – Tom McCarthy, American film director and actor
- June 8 – Julianna Margulies, American actress and producer
- June 13 – Grigori Perelman, Russian mathematician
- June 16 – Jan Železný, Czech javelin thrower
- June 18 – Kurt Browning, Canadian figure skater
- June 19 – Samuel West, British actor
- June 22
  - Michael Park, British rally co-driver (d. 2005)
  - Emmanuelle Seigner, French actress
  - Dean Woods, Australian cyclist and Olympic champion (d. 2022)
- June 23 – Richie Jen, Taiwanese musician
- June 24 – Adrienne Shelly, American actress, film director and screenwriter (d. 2006)
- June 25 – Dikembe Mutombo, Congolese-American basketball player (d. 2024)
- June 26 – Dany Boon, French comedian and filmmaker
- June 27 – J. J. Abrams, American television writer and producer
- June 28
  - John Cusack, American actor
  - Mary Stuart Masterson, American actress
- June 29 – Basuki Tjahaja Purnama, Indonesian politician, governor of Jakarta
- June 30
  - Cheryl Bernard, Canadian Olympic curler
  - Marton Csokas, New Zealand actor
  - Mike Tyson, African-American boxer

=== July ===
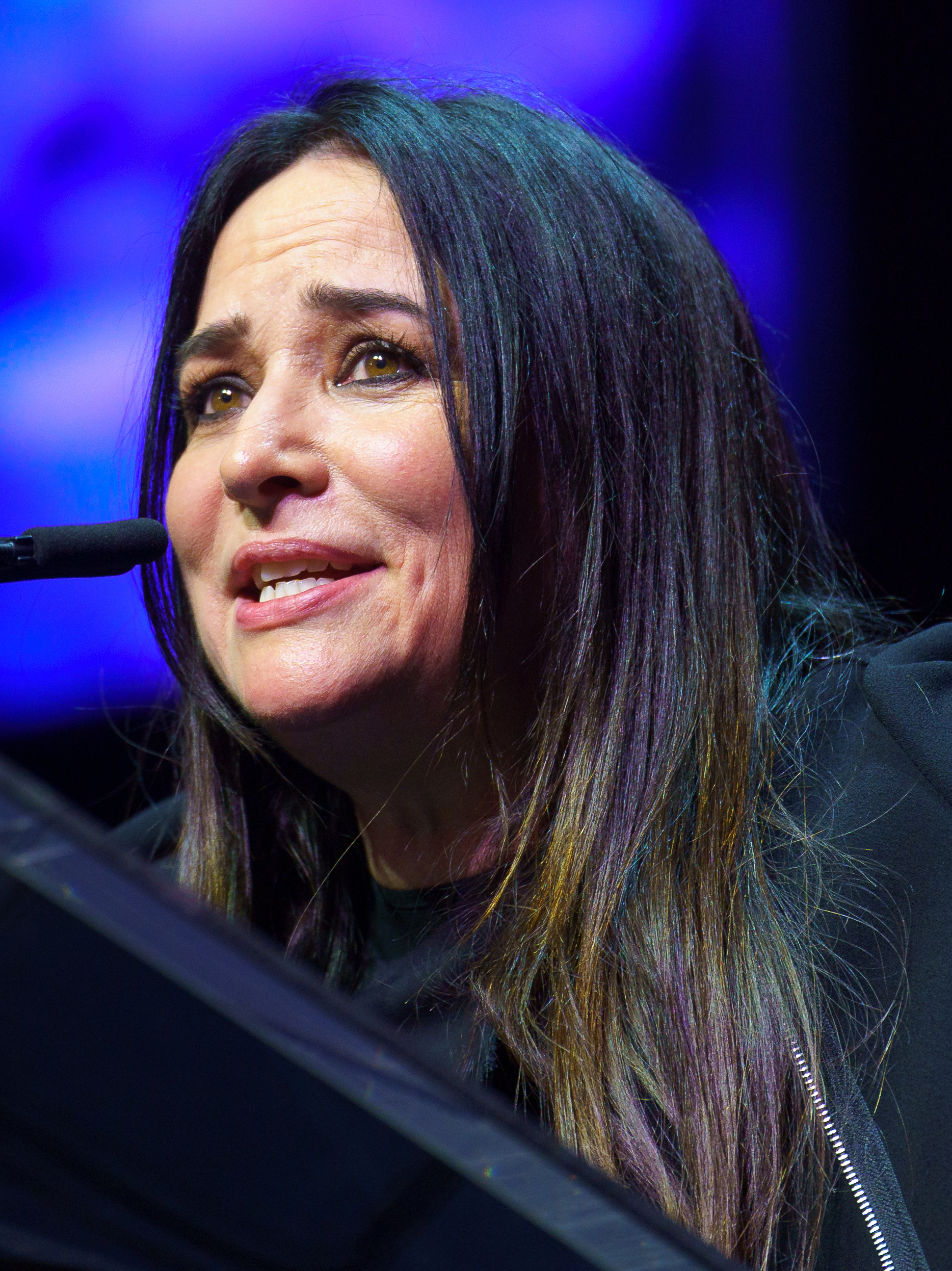
Pamela Adlon

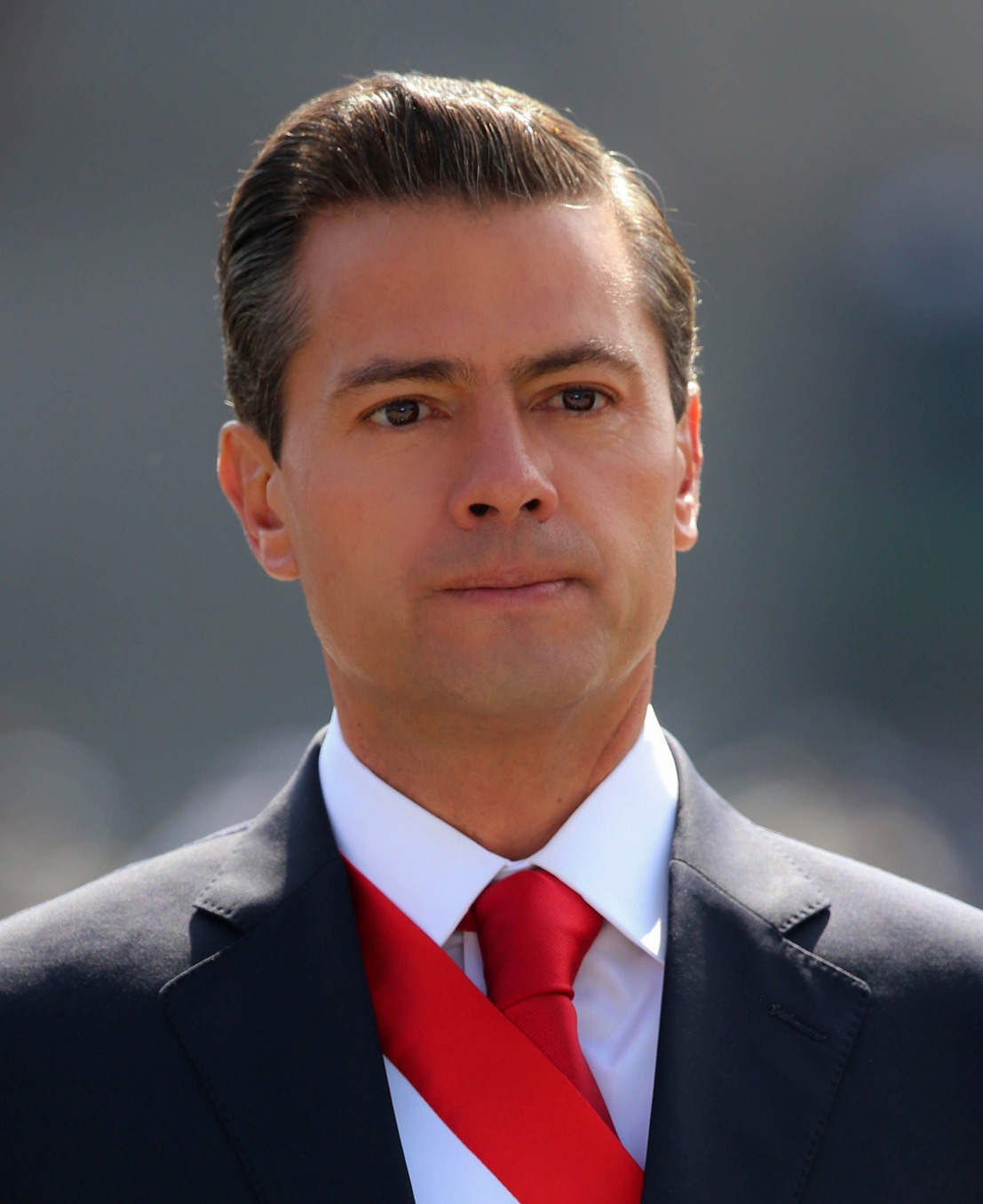
Enrique Peña Nieto

- July 1
  - Enrico Annoni, Italian footballer
  - Samir Rifai, Prime Minister of Jordan
- July 5 – Gianfranco Zola, Italian footballer
- July 9 – Pamela Adlon, American actress, voice actress, screenwriter, producer and director
- July 10 – Gina Bellman, New Zealand-British actress
- July 11 – Kentaro Miura, Japanese author and illustrator (d. 2021)
- July 14 – Matthew Fox, American actor
- July 15 – Irène Jacob, French-born actress
- July 16 – Nemesio Oseguera Cervantes, Mexican drug lord (d. 2026)
- July 18
  - Dan O'Brien, American athlete
  - Lori Alan, American voice actress
- July 20 – Enrique Peña Nieto, President of Mexico (2012–2018), Governor of the State of Mexico (2005–2011)
- July 21 – Sarah Waters, British novelist
- July 26 – Angelo Di Livio, Italian footballer
- July 27 – Maryann Corpus-Mañalac, Filipino associate justice of the Sandiganbayan
- July 28 – Miguel Ángel Nadal, Spanish footballer
- July 29 – Richard Steven Horvitz, American actor and voice actor
- July 30 – Murilo Bustamante, Brazilian mixed martial artist
- July 31 – Dean Cain, American actor

=== August ===
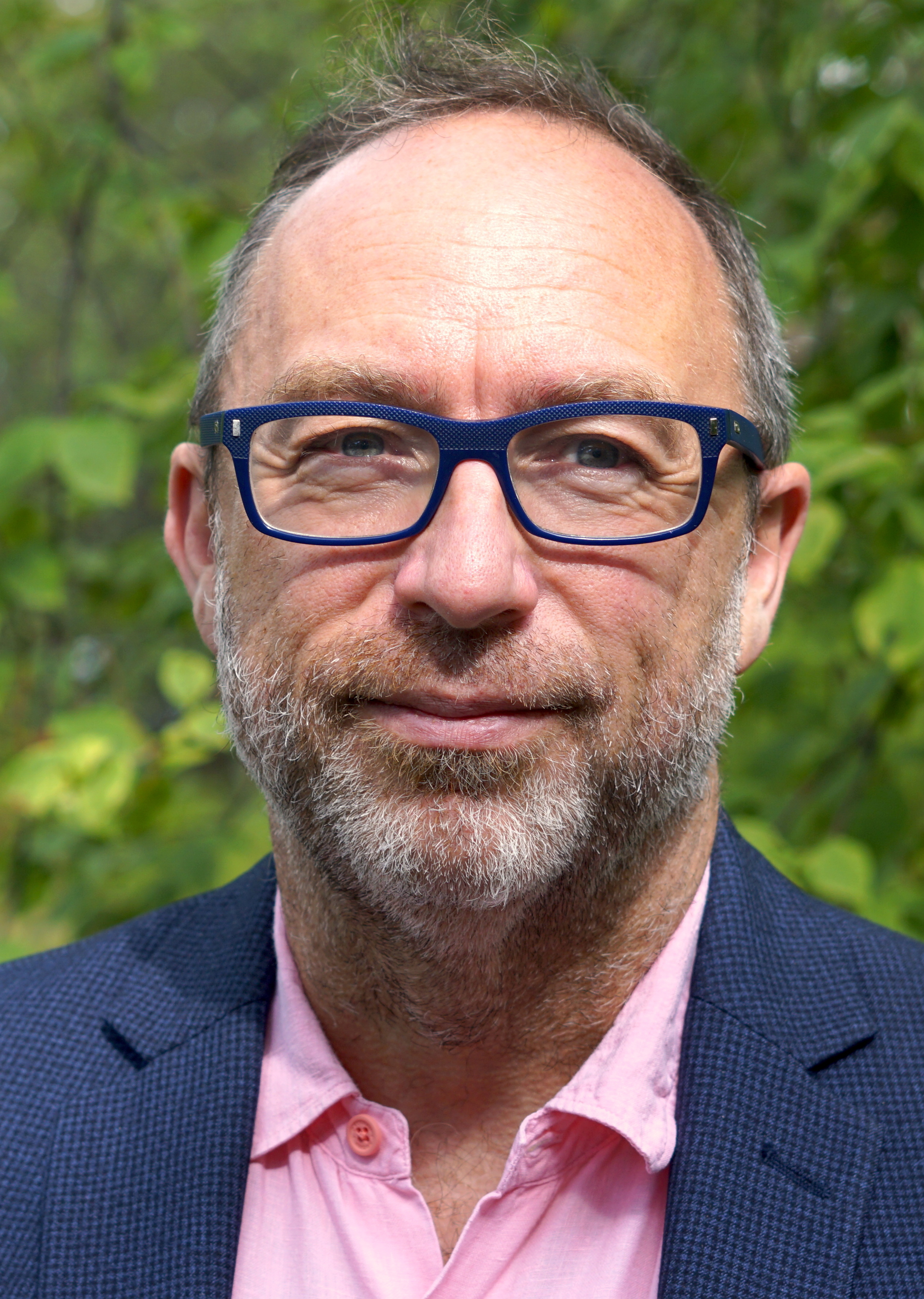
Jimmy Wales

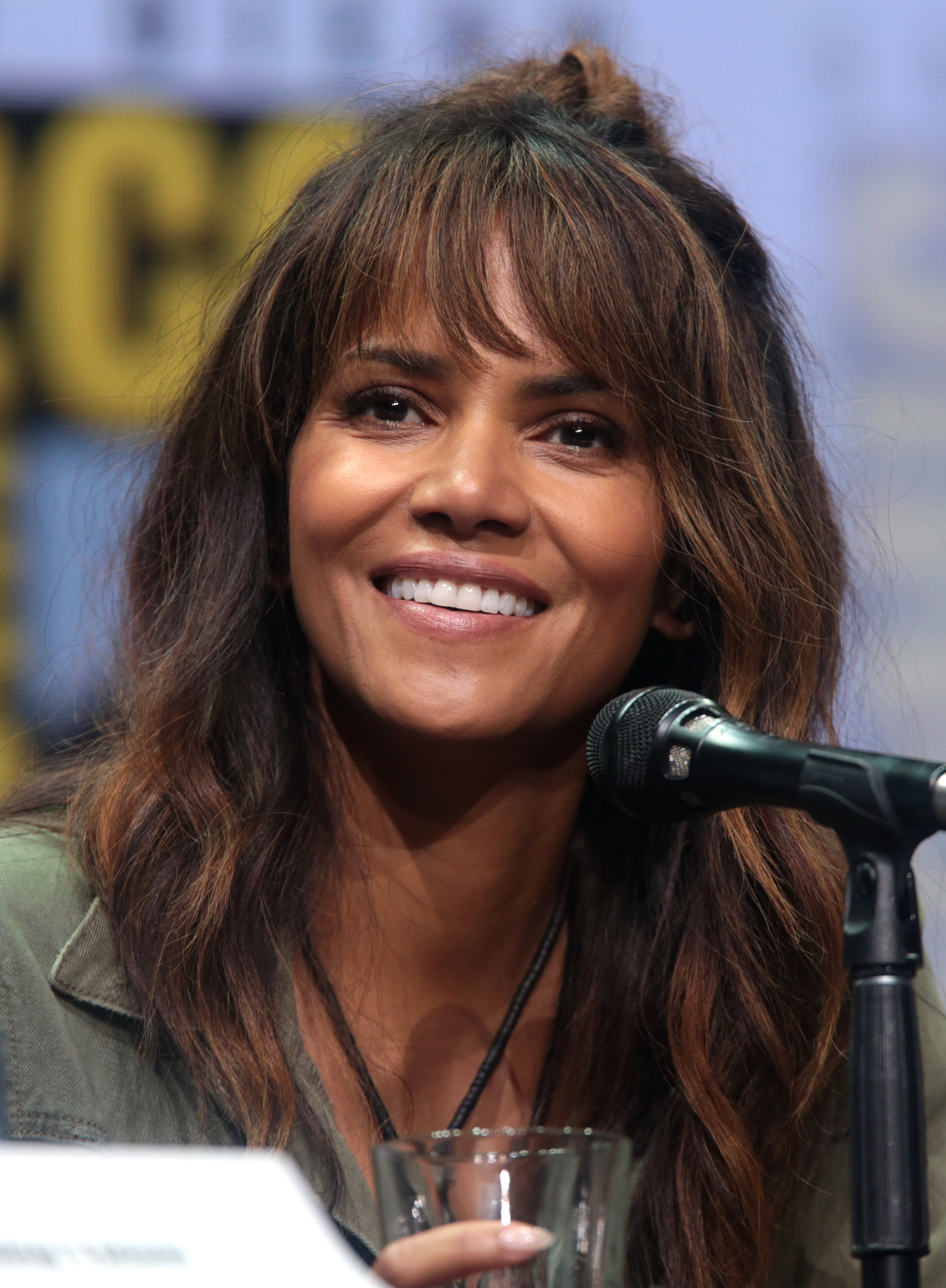
Halle Berry

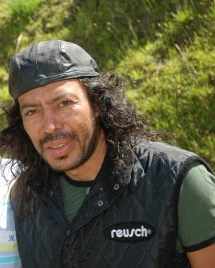
Rene Higuita

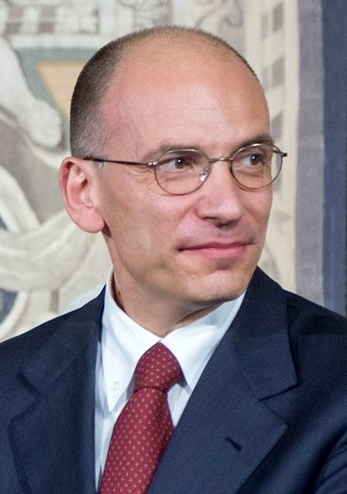
Enrico Letta

- August 4 - Philippe Maidenberg, French architect, interior designer and furnishing designer
- August 5 – James Gunn, American filmmaker
- August 7
  - Harith Iskander, Malaysian actor and comedian
  - Jimmy Wales, American-British entrepreneur, co-founder of Wikipedia
- August 9
  - Glenn Postolski, Argentine professor (d. 2024)
- August 10
  - Hossam Hassan, Egyptian footballer
  - André Sogliuzzo, American actor and voice actor
- August 11 – Juan María Solare, Argentine composer
- August 12 – Les Ferdinand, English footballer
- August 14
  - Halle Berry, American actress
  - Freddy Rincón, Colombian footballer (d. 2022)
- August 17 – Rodney Mullen, American skateboarder
- August 19 – Lee Ann Womack, American musician
- August 20
  - Dimebag Darrell, American guitarist (d. 2004)
  - Enrico Letta, 55th Prime Minister of Italy
  - Liu Chunyan, Chinese voice actress and host
- August 23 – Rik Smits, Dutch basketball player
- August 26
  - Jacques Brinkman, Dutch field hockey player
  - Shirley Manson, Scottish musician
- August 27
  - Jeroen Duyster, Dutch rower
  - Juhan Parts, 15th Prime Minister of Estonia
- August 28 – Priya Dutt, Indian social worker and politician

=== September ===
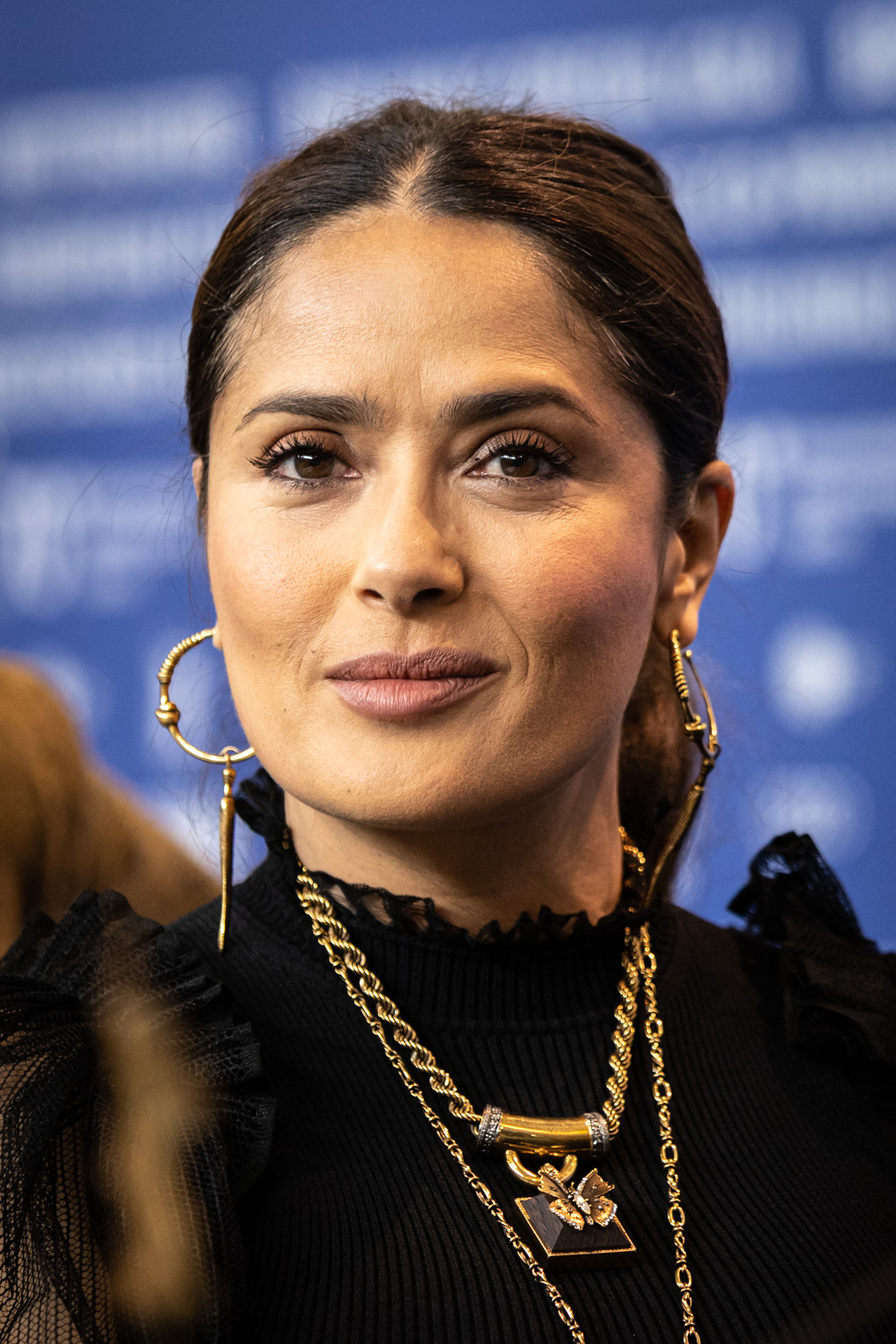
Salma Hayek

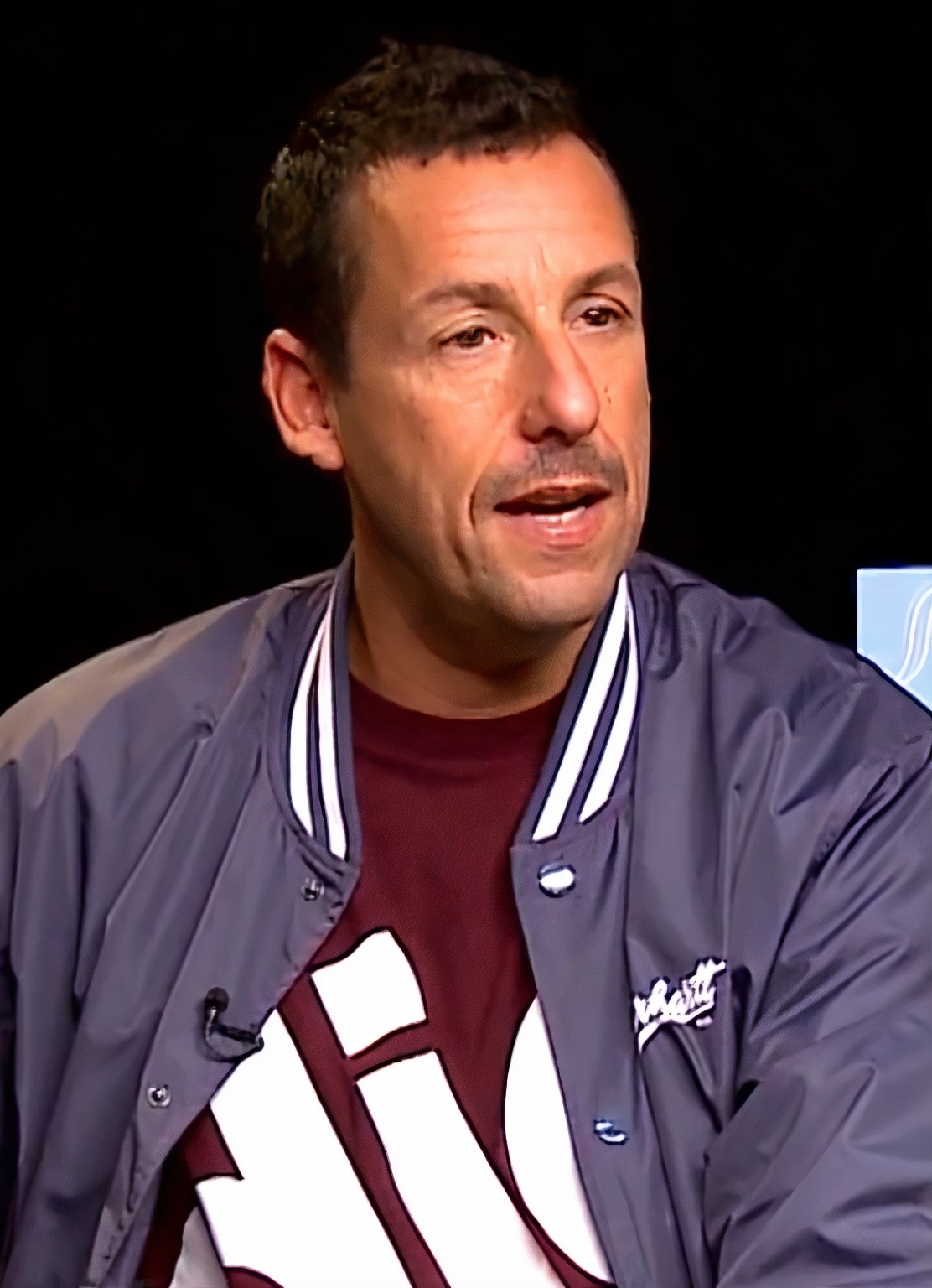
Adam Sandler

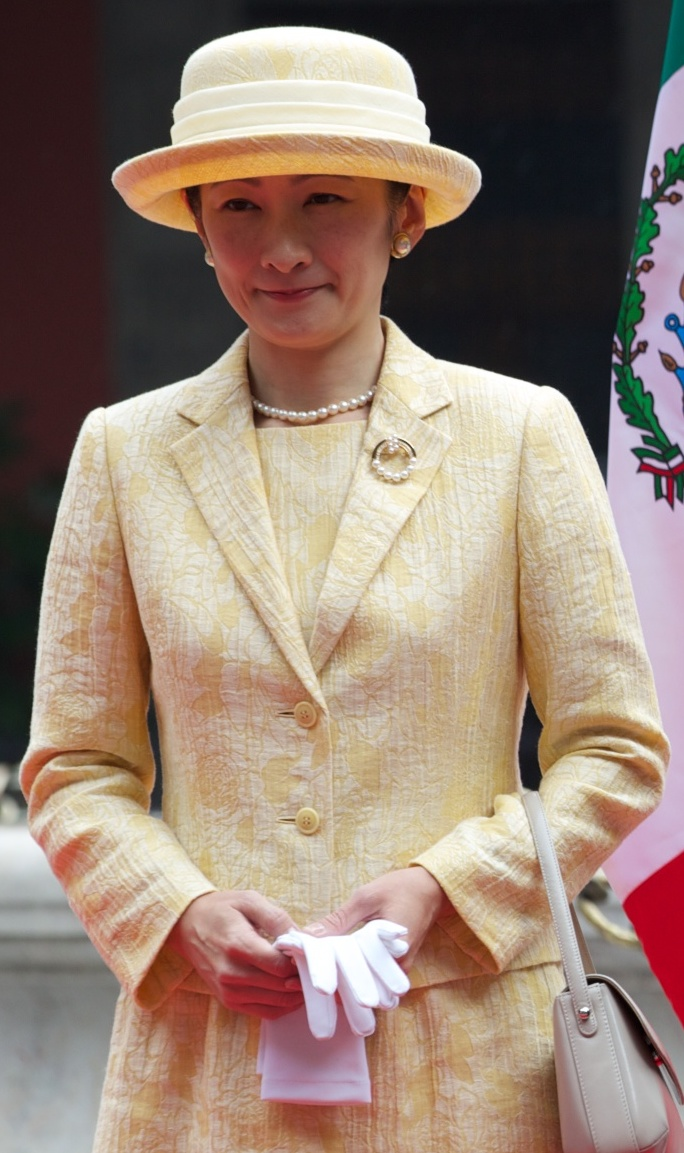
Kiko, Crown Princess of Japan

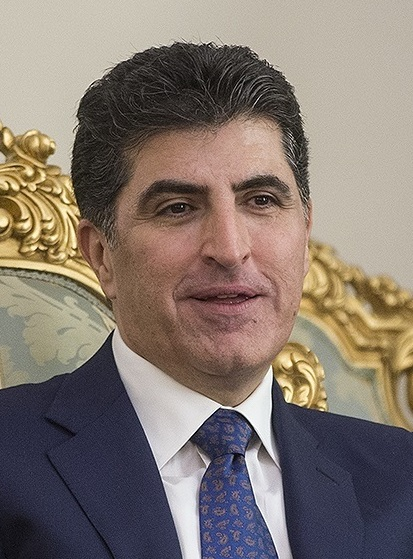
Nechirvan Barzani

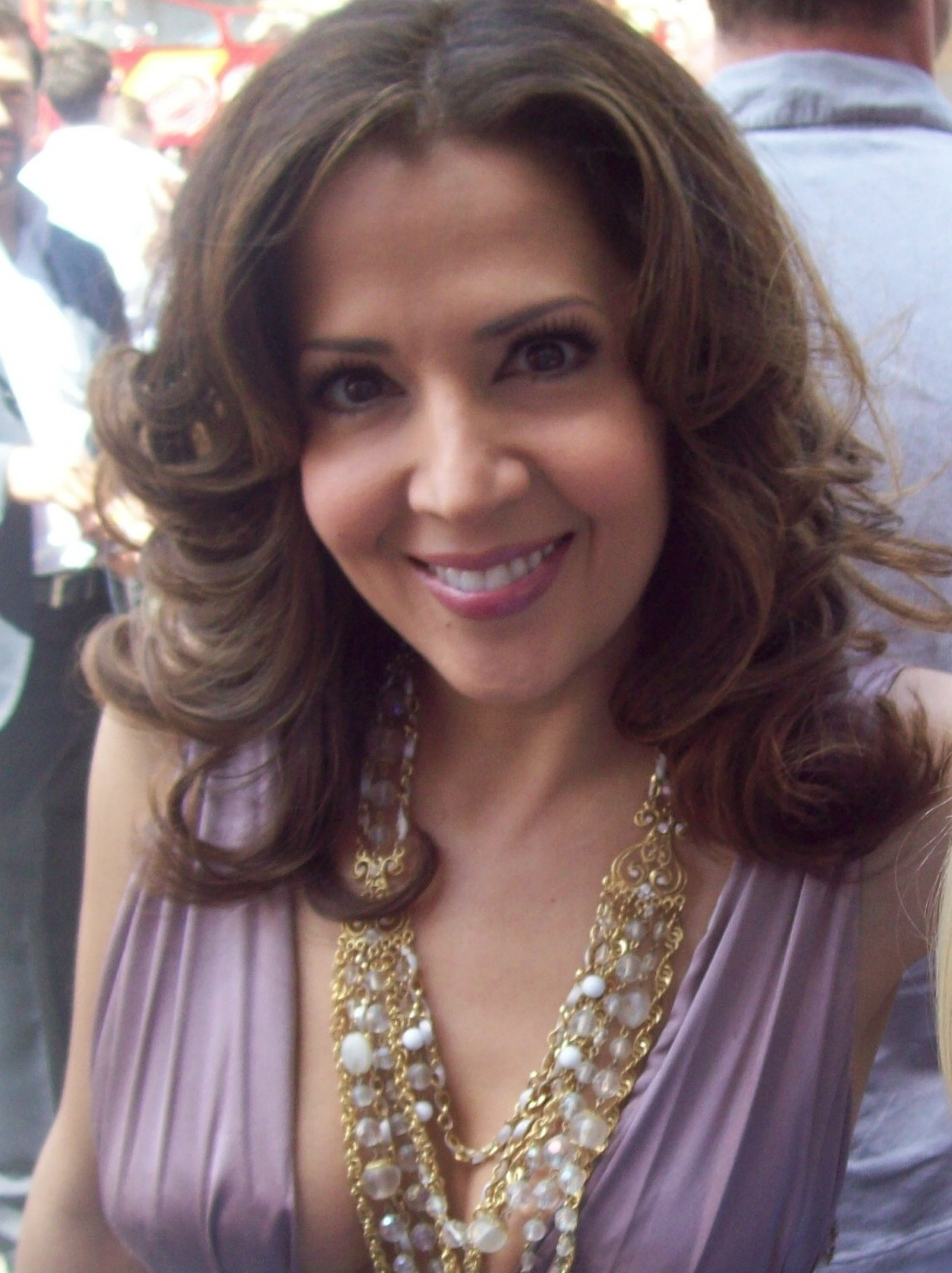
Maria Canals-Barrera

- September 1 – Tim Hardaway, American basketball player
- September 2 – Salma Hayek, Mexican-American actress
- September 4 – Yanka Dyagileva, Russian singer (d. 1991)
- September 6
  - Emil Boc, 61st Prime Minister of Romania
  - Eduardo Maruri, Ecuadorian businessman and politician
- September 7
  - Vladimir Andreyev, Russian race walker
  - Toby Jones, English actor
  - Gunda Niemann-Stirnemann, German speed skater
- September 8 – Carola Häggkvist, Swedish pop singer, Eurovision Song Contest 1991 winner
- September 9
  - Georg Hackl, German luger
  - Adam Sandler, American actor and comedian
- September 12
  - Steve Ells, American entrepreneur and founder of Chipotle Mexican Grill
  - Ben Folds, American singer-songwriter & pianist
  - Princess Akishino of Japan
  - Malu Mader, Brazilian actress
- September 19 – Eric Rudolph American domestic terrorist, perpetrator of the Centennial Olympic Park bombing and the Otherside Lounge bombing
- September 20 – Nuno Bettencourt, Portuguese-American guitarist and singer-songwriter
- September 21 – Nechirvan Barzani, President of Iraqi Kurdistan
- September 22
  - Erdoğan Atalay, German actor
  - Moustafa Amar, Egyptian singer
- September 25 – Jason Flemyng, English actor
- September 26 – Jenn Hill, American politician and member of the Michigan House of Representatives since 2023
- September 27 – Debbie Wasserman Schultz, Member of the US House from Florida
- September 28 – Maria Canals-Barrera, American actress
- September 29
  - Bujar Nishani, President of Albania (d. 2022)
  - Alexandra Vieira, Portuguese teacher and politician

=== October ===
David Cameron

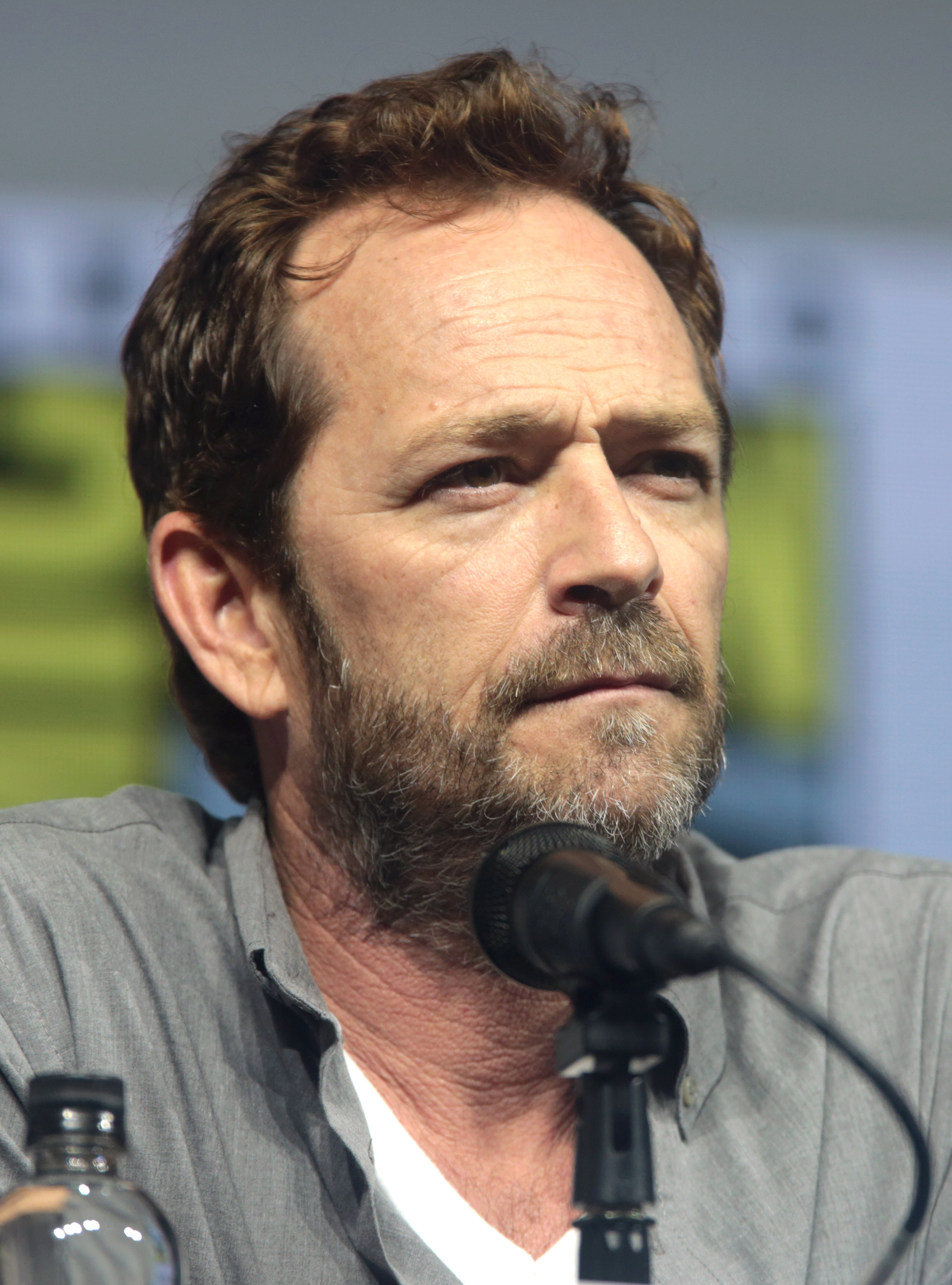
Luke Perry

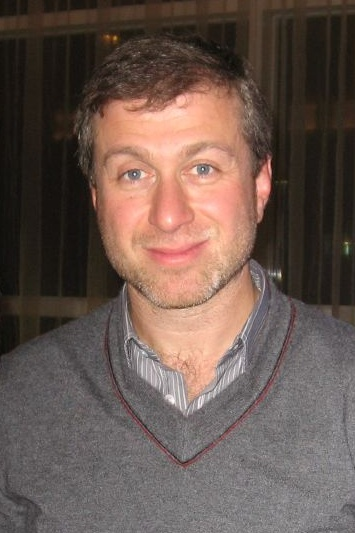
Roman Abramovich

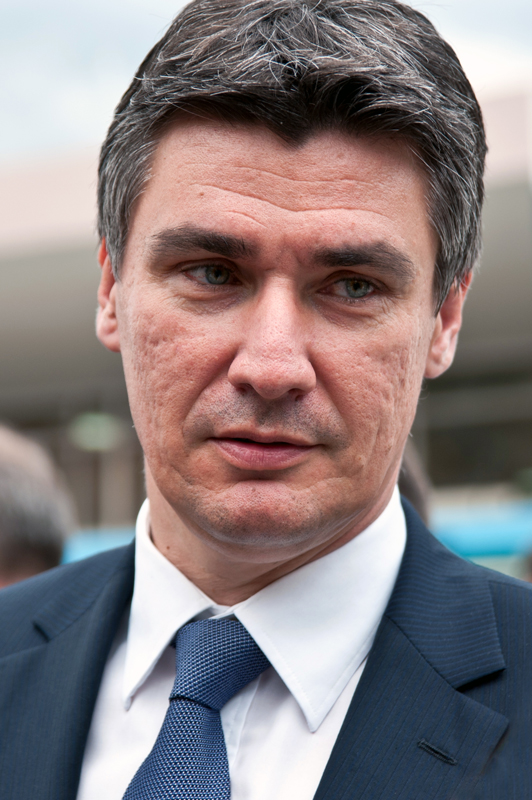
Zoran Milanović

- October 1
  - Ashab Uddin, Indian politician
  - George Weah, Liberian politician and football player
- October 2 – Rodney Anoa'i, Samoan-American professional wrestler (d. 2000)
- October 5 – Inessa Kravets, Ukrainian athlete
- October 6 – Niall Quinn, Irish footballer
- October 7 – Sherman Alexie, Native American author
- October 9 – David Cameron, Prime Minister of the United Kingdom 2010–2016
- October 10
  - Tony Adams, English footballer
  - Carolyn Bertozzi, American chemist, Nobel Prize laureate
  - Bai Ling, Chinese actress
  - Elana Meyer, South African athlete
- October 11 – Luke Perry, American actor (d. 2019)
- October 15 – Jorge Campos, Mexican footballer and coach
- October 18 – Angela Visser, Dutch winner of Miss Universe 1989
- October 19 – Jon Favreau, American actor and director
- October 20 – Stefan Raab, German entertainer, television host, comedian and musician
- October 22 – Valeria Golino, Italian-Greek film and television actress
- October 24 – Roman Abramovich, UK-based Russian billionaire businessman
- October 25 – Wendel Clark, Canadian hockey player
- October 28 – Andy Richter, American actor, writer, comedian and late-night talk show announcer
- October 30 – Zoran Milanović, Croatian politician, President of Croatia
- October 31
  - Adam Horovitz, American rapper
  - Mike O'Malley, American actor and playwright

=== November ===
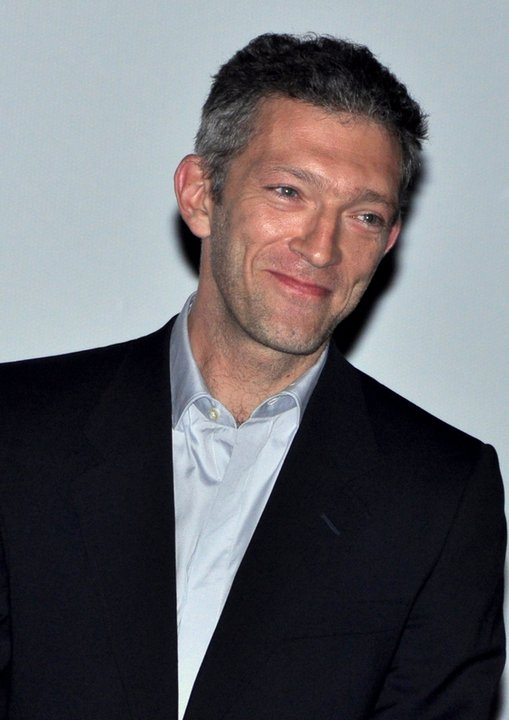
Vincent Cassel

- November 2
  - David Schwimmer, American actor
- November 3 – Joe Hachem, Lebanese-born Australian poker player
- November 8 – Gordon Ramsay, British chef, restaurateur and television personality
- November 11
  - Benedicta Boccoli, Italian model and actress
  - Peaches, Canadian musician
- November 15 – Rachel True, American actress
- November 17
  - Jeff Buckley, American singer-songwriter (d. 1997)
  - Daisy Fuentes, Cuban-born American model and television personality
  - Sophie Marceau, French actress
- November 19
  - Gail Devers, American track and field athlete
  - Jason Scott Lee, American actor and martial artist
- November 22
  - Orlando Jorge Mera, Dominican politician (d. 2022)
  - Michael K. Williams, American actor (d. 2021)
- November 23
  - Vincent Cassel, French actor
  - Michelle Gomez, Scottish actress
- November 25
  - Billy Burke, American actor
  - Roberto Rojas, Bolivian politician (d. 2022)
- November 26 – Garcelle Beauvais, Haitian-American actress, singer and fashion model
- November 28 – Narumi Yasuda, Japanese actress
- November 29 – John Bradshaw Layfield, American professional wrestler

=== December ===
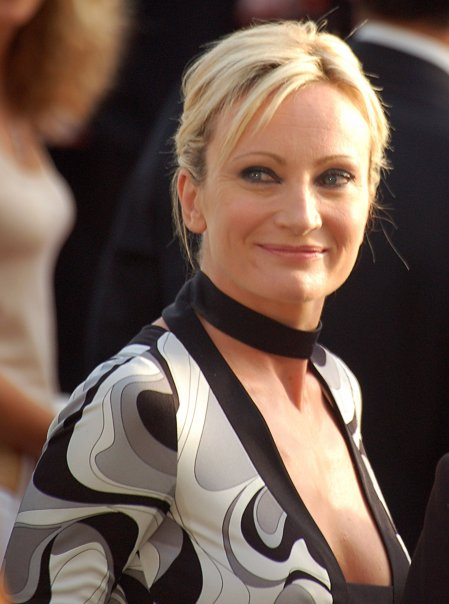
Patricia Kaas

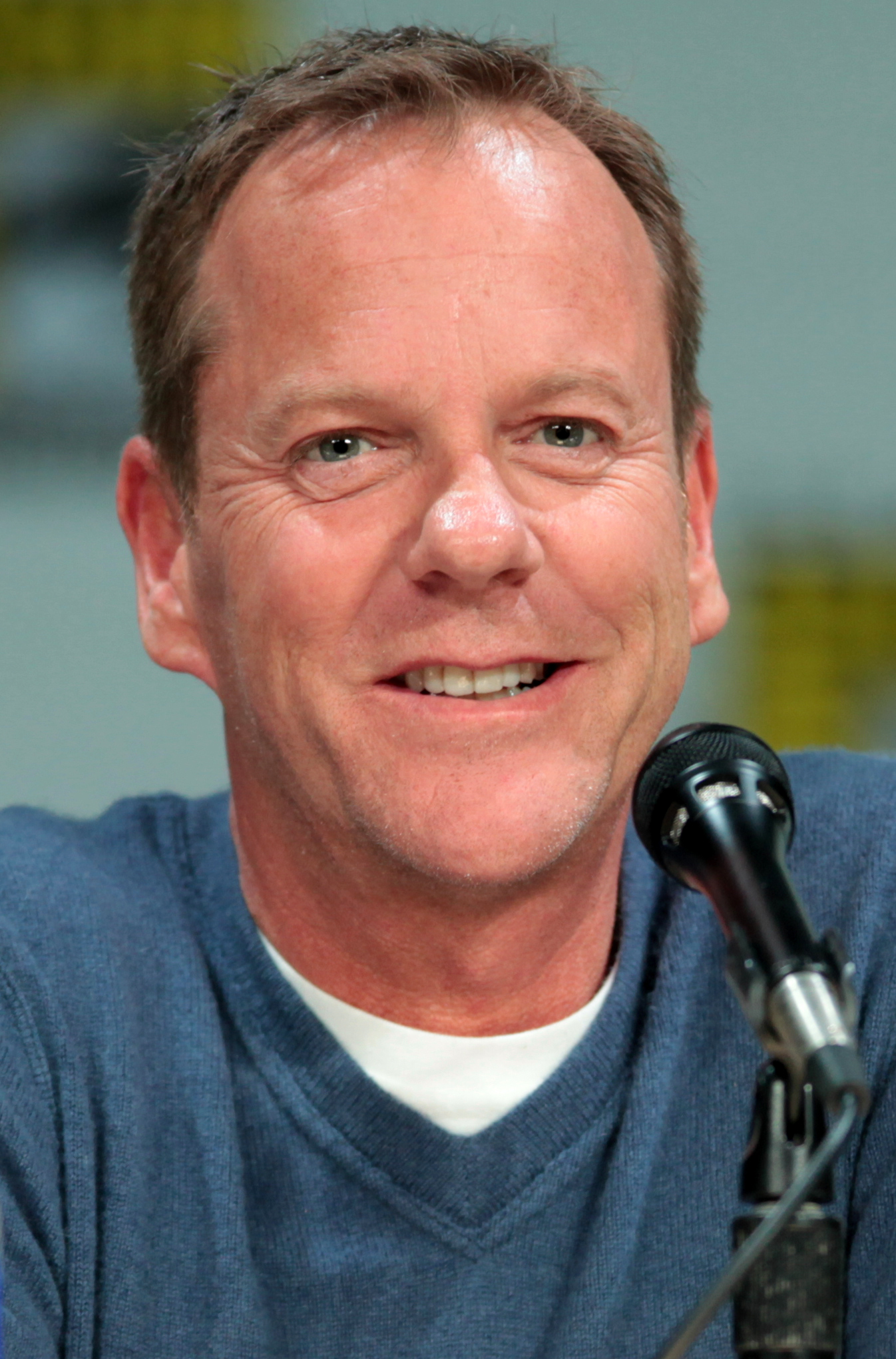
Kiefer Sutherland

- December 4 – Fred Armisen, American actor, comedian and musician
- December 5 – Patricia Kaas, French singer and actress
- December 7
  - C. Thomas Howell, American actor and director
  - Linn Ullmann, Norwegian journalist and author
- December 8 – Sinéad O'Connor, Irish singer (d. 2023)
- December 10
  - Kirsten Gillibrand, American politician; United States Senator (D-NY)
  - Gideon Sa'ar, Israeli politician
  - Kadyrbek Sarbayev, foreign minister of Kyrgyzstan
  - Natee Thongsookkaew, Thailand footballer
- December 12 – Último Dragón, Japanese professional wrestler
- December 14 – Helle Thorning-Schmidt, Danish Prime Minister
- December 15 – Katja von Garnier, German film director
- December 17 – Miloš Tichý, Czech astronomer
- December 19
  - Tim Sköld, Swedish multi-instrumentalist musician
  - Alberto Tomba, Italian alpine skier
- December 20 – Ed de Goeij, Dutch footballer
- December 21
  - Kiefer Sutherland, Canadian actor and film director
  - William Samoei Ruto, 5th President of the Republic of Kenya
- December 22 – Dmitry Bilozerchev, Soviet gymnast
- December 23 – Cláudia Raia, Brazilian actress, dancer and singer
- December 24 – Diedrich Bader, American actor and voice artist
- December 27 – Bill Goldberg, American professional wrestler
- December 28 – Kaliopi, Macedonian singer-songwriter

== Deaths ==
=== January ===
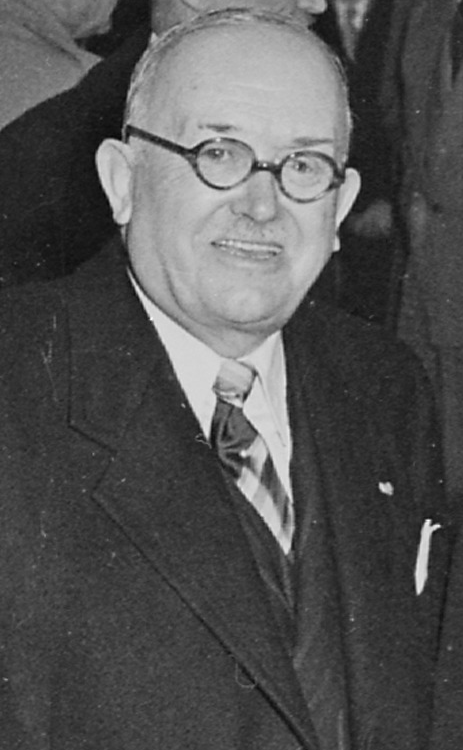
Vincent Auriol

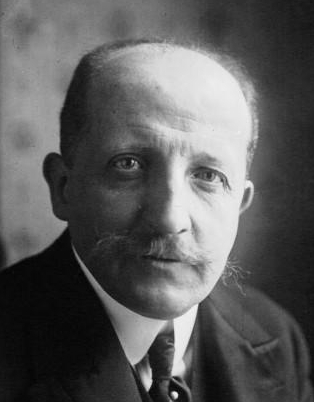
Georges Theunis

- January 1 – Vincent Auriol, French politician, President of France (b. 1884)
- January 3
  - Sammy Younge Jr., American civil rights activist (b. 1944)
  - Marguerite Higgins, American journalist (b. 1920)
- January 4 – Georges Theunis, 24th Prime Minister of Belgium (b. 1873)
- January 10 – Ignacy Oziewicz, Polish general (b. 1887)
- January 11
  - Alberto Giacometti, Swiss sculptor and painter (b. 1901)
  - Hannes Kolehmainen, Finnish Olympic athlete (b. 1889)
  - Lal Bahadur Shastri, Indian activist, 2nd Prime Minister of India (b. 1904)
- January 14
  - Juan Pablo Barrero, Spanish footballer and lawyer (b. 1900)
  - Bill Carr, American Olympic athlete (b. 1909)
  - Sergei Korolev, Soviet rocket engineer and spacecraft designer (b. 1907)
- January 15
  - Samuel Akintola, Nigerian premier of the Western region and Aare Ona Kakanfo XIII of the Yoruba (assassinated) (b. 1910)
  - Abubakar Tafawa Balewa, Nigerian politician, 1st Prime Minister of Nigeria (assassinated) (b. 1912)
  - Sir Ahmadu Bello, Nigerian premier of the Northern region (assassinated) (b. 1910)
- January 16 – Courtney Hodges, American army general (b. 1887)
- January 17 – Vincent J. Donehue, American stage director (b. 1917)
- January 22 – Herbert Marshall, English actor (b. 1890)
- January 25 – Saul Adler, Russian-born British-Israeli expert on parasitology (b. 1895)
- January 31
  - Elizabeth Patterson, American actress (b. 1874)
  - Arthur Percival, British general (b.1887)

=== February ===
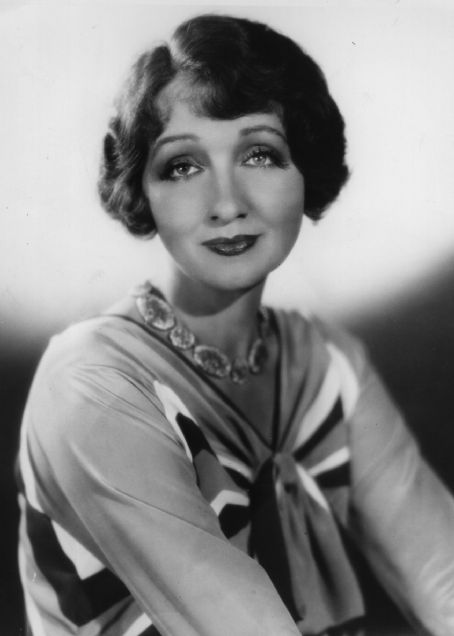
Hedda Hopper

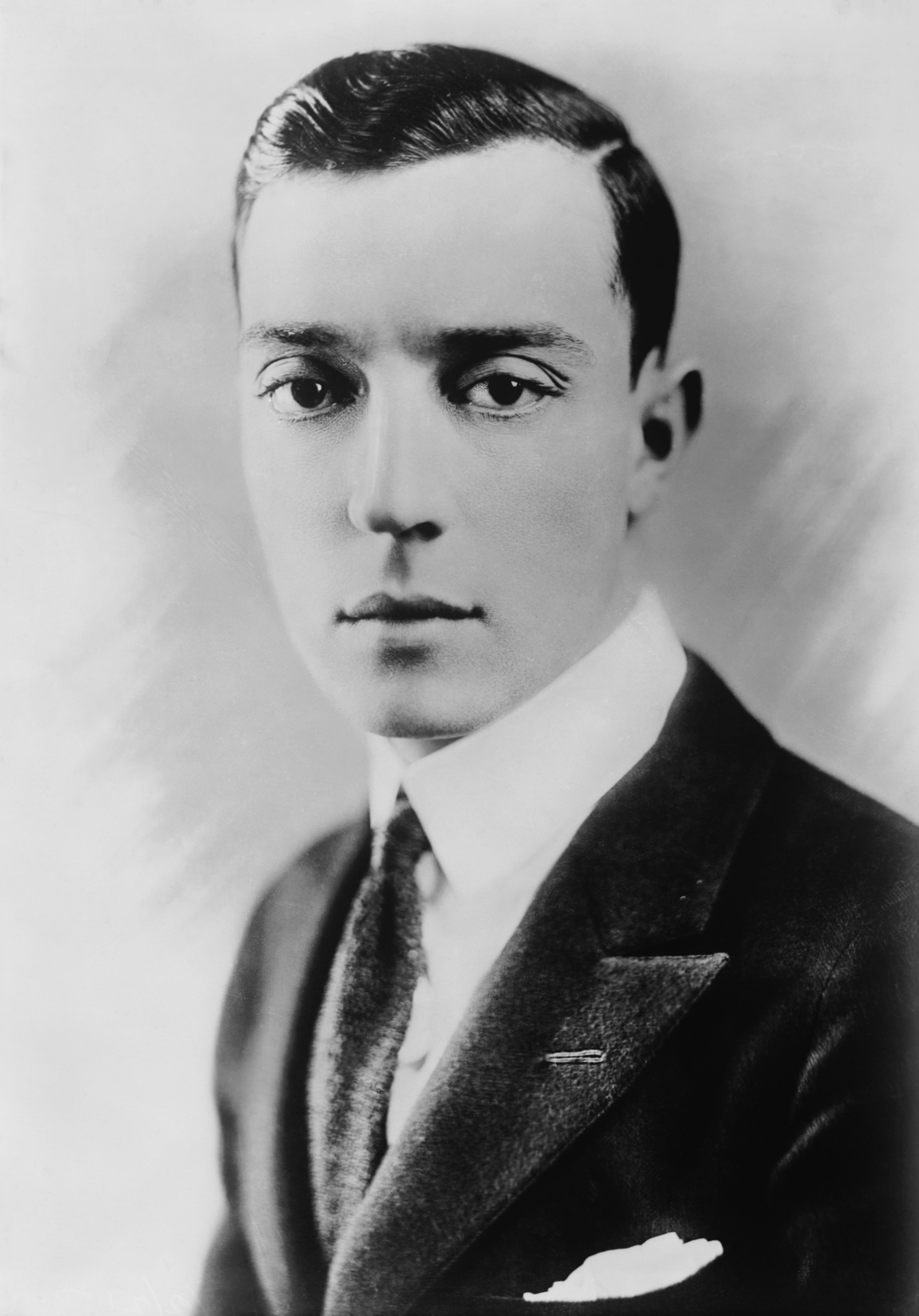
Buster Keaton

- February 1
  - Hedda Hopper, American actress and gossip columnist (b. 1885)
  - Buster Keaton, American actor and film director (b. 1895)
  - Joseph R. Knowland, American politician and newspaper publisher (b. 1873)
- February 6 – Narcisa de León, Filipino film producer (b. 1877)
- February 9 – Sophie Tucker, Russian-born American singer (b. 1886)
- February 10
  - J. F. C. Fuller, British general and military strategist (b. 1878)
  - Billy Rose, American composer and band leader (b. 1899)
- February 12 – Wilhelm Röpke, German economist (b. 1899)
- February 15
  - Gerard Ciołek, Polish architect and historian (b. 1909)
  - Camilo Torres Restrepo, Colombian socialist and Roman Catholic priest (b. 1929)
- February 17
  - Alfred P. Sloan, American automobile industrialist (b. 1875)
  - Hans Hofmann, German-American painter (b. 1880)
- February 18 – Robert Rossen, American film director (b. 1908)
- February 20 – Chester W. Nimitz, American Navy admiral (b. 1885)
- February 25 – Victor Kravchenko, Soviet writer (b. 1905)
- February 26
  - Vinayak Damodar Savarkar, Indian pro-independence activist, Hindu nationalist (b. 1883)
  - Gino Severini, Italian painter (b. 1883)
- February 28
  - Charles Bassett, American astronaut (b. 1931)
  - Jonathan Hale, American actor (b. 1891)
  - Victor Jacob Koningsberger, Dutch botanist (b. 1895)
  - Elliot See, American astronaut (b. 1927)

=== March ===
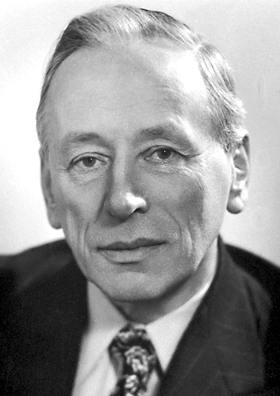
Frits Zernike

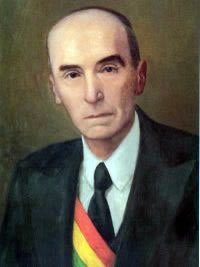
Néstor Guillén

- March 1
  - Fritz Houtermans, German physicist (b. 1903)
  - William R. Munroe, American admiral (b. 1886)
- March 3
  - William Frawley, American actor (I Love Lucy) (b. 1887)
  - Alice Pearce, American actress (b. 1917)
- March 5 – Anna Akhmatova, Russian poet (b. 1889)
- March 6 – Michitaro Tozuka, Japanese admiral (b. 1890)
- March 7 – Donald B. Beary, American admiral (b. 1888)
- March 8 – Abdel Hadi Al Gazzar, Egyptian painter (b. 1925)
- March 10 – Frits Zernike, Dutch physicist, Nobel Prize laureate (b. 1888)
- March 12 – Néstor Guillén, Bolivian politician, 40th President of Bolivia (b. 1890)
- March 20 – Laurence Abrams, English professional footballer (b. 1889)
- March 27 – Helen Menken, American actress (b. 1901)
- March 29 – Stylianos Gonatas, Prime Minister of Greece (b. 1876)
- March 30 – Erwin Piscator, German theater director (b. 1893)

=== April ===
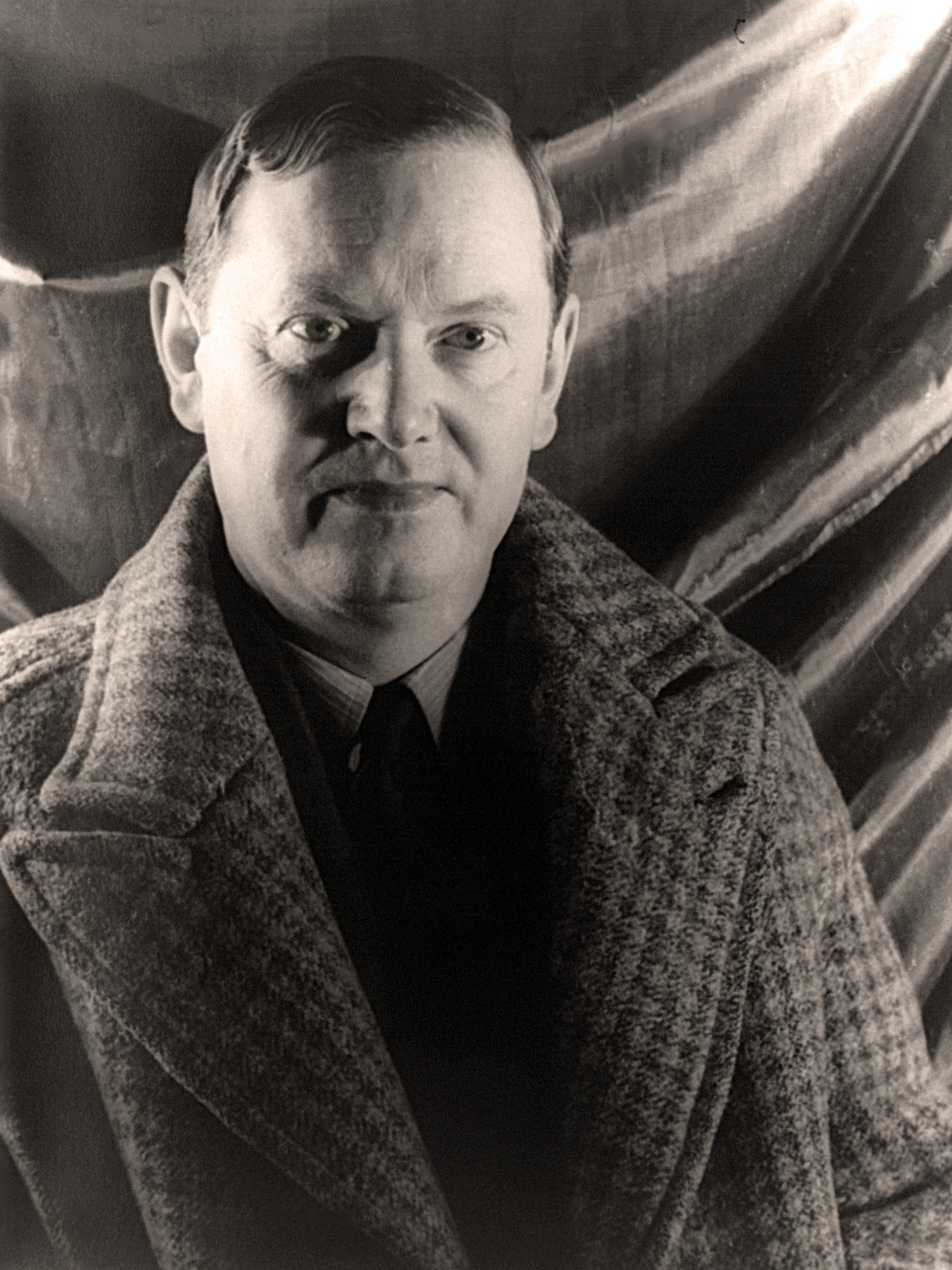
Evelyn Waugh

- April 1 – Flann O'Brien, Irish humorist (b. 1911)
- April 2 – C. S. Forester, English author (b. 1899)
- April 3 – Battista Farina, Italian car designer (b. 1893)
- April 6 – Julia Faye, American actress (b. 1893)
- April 10 – Evelyn Waugh, English author (b. 1903)
- April 13
  - Carlo Carrà, Italian painter (b. 1881)
  - Georges Duhamel, French author (b. 1884)
  - Abdul Salam Arif, Iraqi military officer and statesman, 2nd President of Iraq (b. 1921)
- April 17 – Mario Serandrei, Italian editor and screenwriter (b. 1907)
- April 19 – Javier Solís, Mexican singer and actor (b. 1931)
- April 20 – Prince Frederick of Prussia (b. 1911)
- April 21 – Sepp Dietrich, Nazi German military leader and SS commander (b. 1892)
- April 23 – George Ohsawa, Japanese dietist, founder of Macrobiotics (b. 1893)
- April 29 – Eugene O'Brien, American actor (b. 1880)

=== May ===
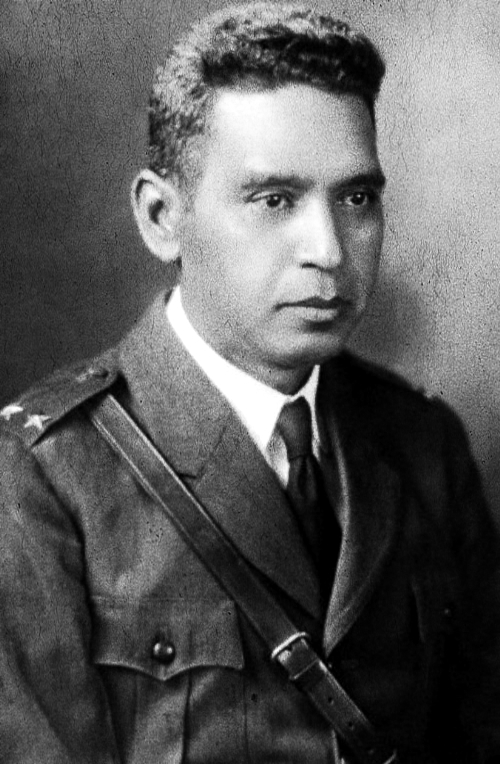
Maximiliano Hernandez Martinez

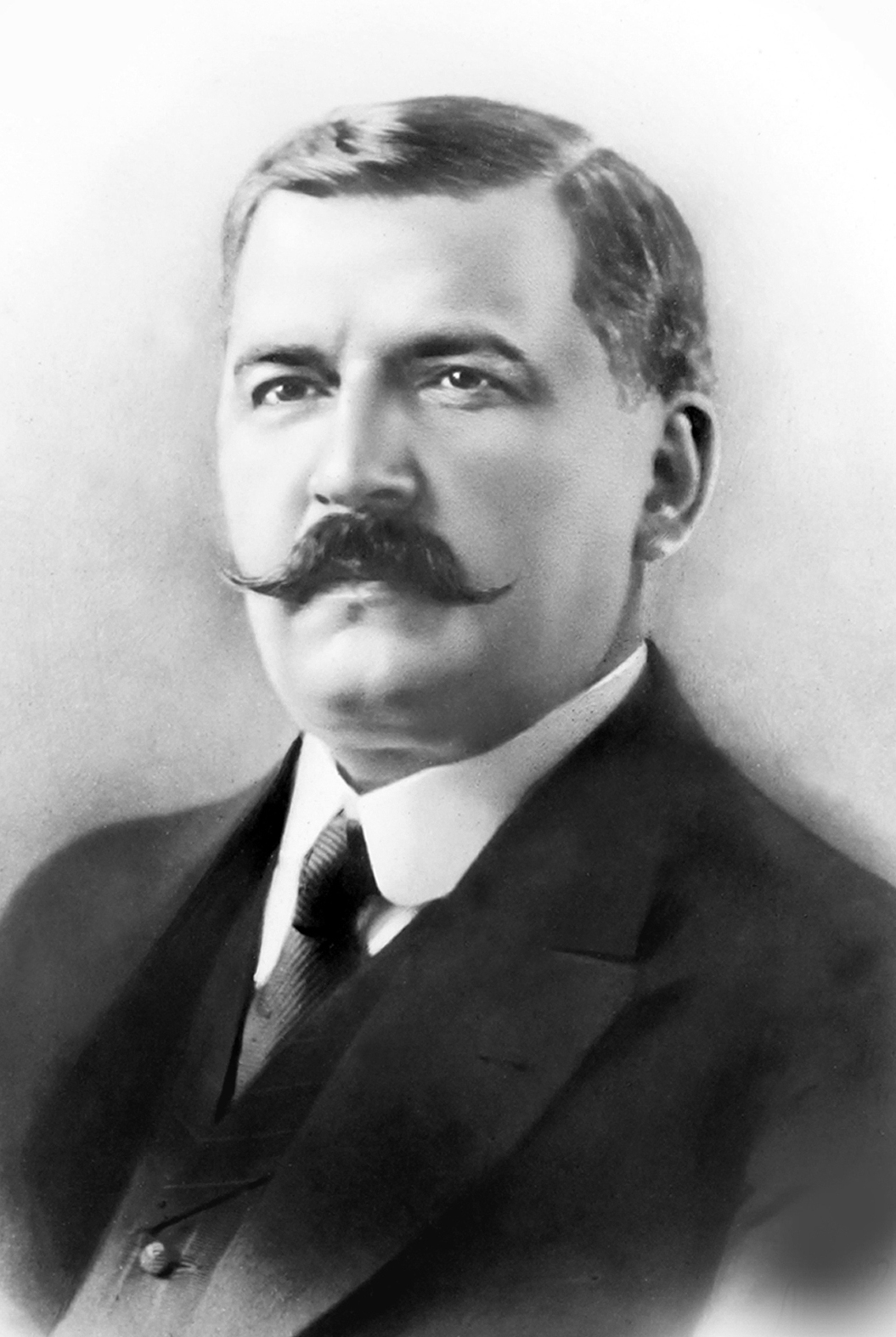
Venceslau Brás

- May 2 – Salvador Moreno Fernández, Spanish admiral and politician (b. 1886)
- May 4 – Amédée Ozenfant, French painter (b. 1886)
- May 8 – Erich Pommer, German film producer (b. 1889)
- May 11 – Alfred Wintle, British army officer and eccentric (b. 1897)
- May 14 – Ludwig Meidner, German painter (b. 1884)
- May 15
  - Venceslau Brás, 9th President of Brazil, leader in World War I (b. 1868)
  - Maximiliano Hernández Martínez, 30th President of El Salvador (assassinated) (b. 1882)
  - Titien Sumarni, Indonesian actress (b. 1932)
- May 20 – Carlos Arruza, Mexican bullfighter (b. 1920)
- May 21 – Lady Dorothy Macmillan, spouse of the Prime Minister of the United Kingdom (b. 1900)
- May 22 – Tom Goddard, English cricketer (b. 1900)
- May 23 – Demchugdongrub, Mongolian politician (b. 1902)
- May 24 – Jim Barnes, English golf champion (b. 1886)
- May 25 – Sir Vernon Sturdee, Australian general (b. 1890)
- May 29 –
  - James Woolf, British film producer (b. 1919)
  - Herminio Díaz García, Cuban exile.

=== June ===
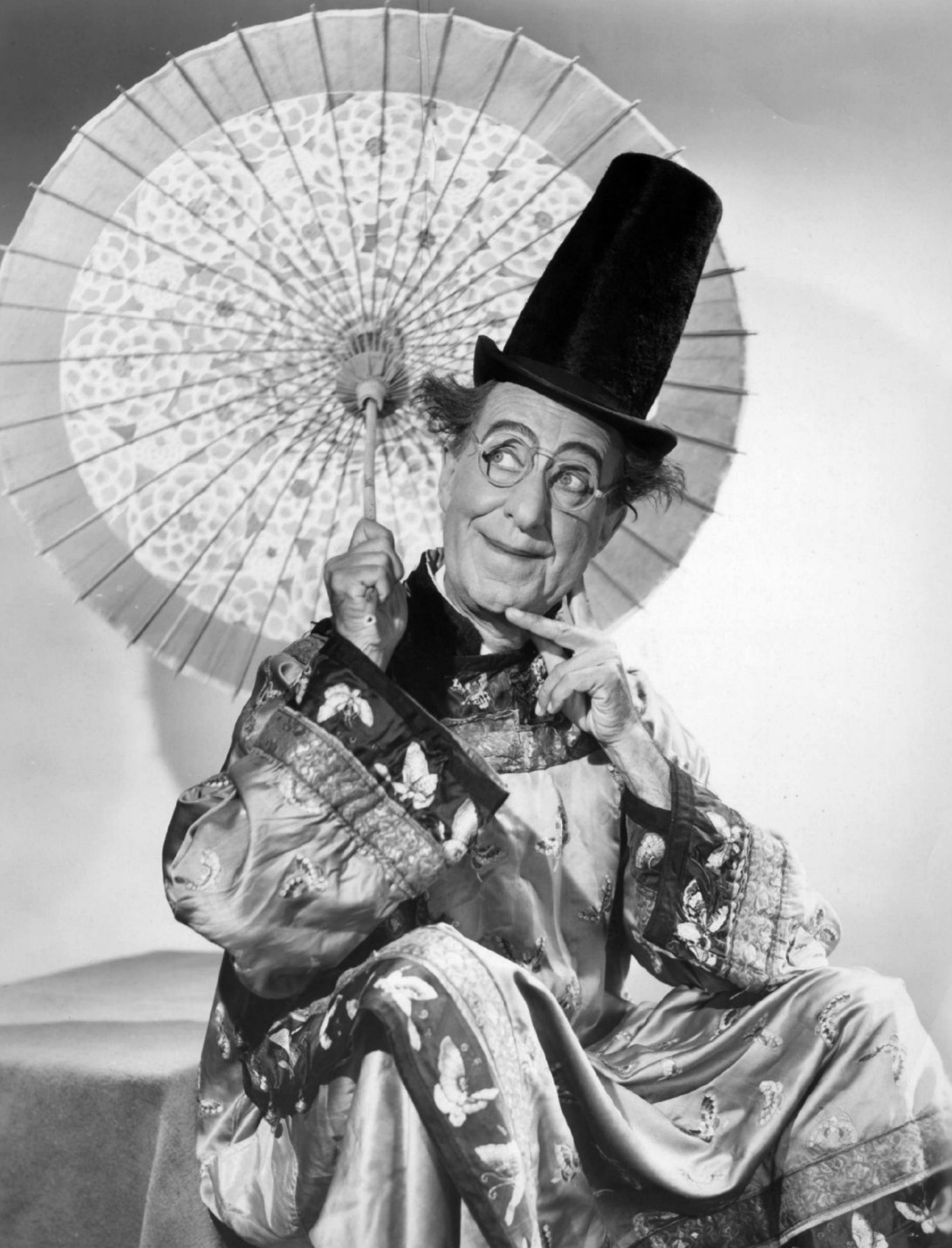
Ed Wynn

- June 1 – Papa Jack Laine, American jazz musician (b. 1873)
- June 3 – Nicholas Straussler, Hungarian engineer (b. 1891)
- June 6 – Ethel Clayton, American actress (b. 1882)
- June 7 – Jean Arp, Alsatian sculptor, painter and poet (b. 1886)
- June 8 – Anton Melik, Slovenian geographer (b. 1890)
- June 11 – Wallace Ford, English-born American actor (b. 1898)
- June 12
  - William Ernest Hocking, American philosopher (b. 1873)
  - Hermann Scherchen, Austrian conductor (b. 1891)
- June 15 – Robert G. Fowler, American pioneer aviator (b. 1884)
- June 19 – Ed Wynn, American actor and comedian (b. 1886)
- June 20 – Georges Lemaître, Belgian priest and astrophysicist (b. 1894)
- June 30
  - Margery Allingham, British detective fiction writer (b. 1904)
  - Giuseppe Farina, Italian racing driver (b. 1906)

=== July ===
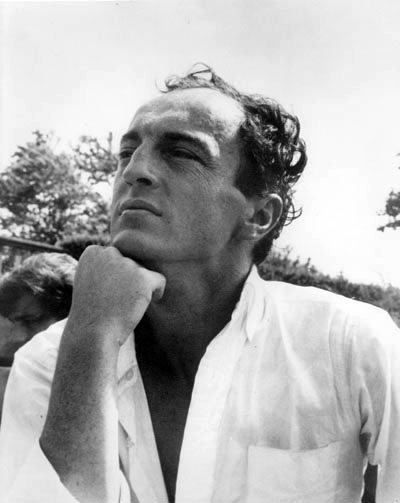
Frank O'Hara

- July 2
  - Jan Brzechwa, Polish poet (b. 1898)
  - John the Wonderworker, Chinese Orthodox bishop, American archbishop and saint (b. 1896)
- July 3 – Deems Taylor, American composer (b. 1885)
- July 5 – George de Hevesy, Hungarian chemist, Nobel Prize laureate (b. 1885)
- July 9 – Venerable Marija Petković, Yugoslav Roman Catholic foundress and Servant of God (b. 1892)
- July 11 – Delmore Schwartz, American poet (b. 1913)
- July 12 – D. T. Suzuki, Japanese scholar and essayist (b. 1870)
- July 14 – Julie Manet, French painter (b. 1878)
- July 18 – Bobby Fuller, American rock and roll musician (b. 1942)
- July 21
  - Francesco Paolo Cantelli, Italian mathematician (b. 1875)
  - Philipp Frank, Austrian physicist and mathematician (b. 1884)
- July 23
  - Montgomery Clift, American actor (b. 1920)
  - Douglass Montgomery, American actor (b. 1907)
- July 25 – Frank O'Hara, American poet (b. 1926)
- July 29 – Johnson Aguiyi-Ironsi, Nigerian head of state (b. 1924)
- July 31
  - Alexander von Falkenhausen, German general and military advisor, 20 July Plotter (b. 1878)
  - Bud Powell, American jazz pianist (b. 1924)

=== August ===
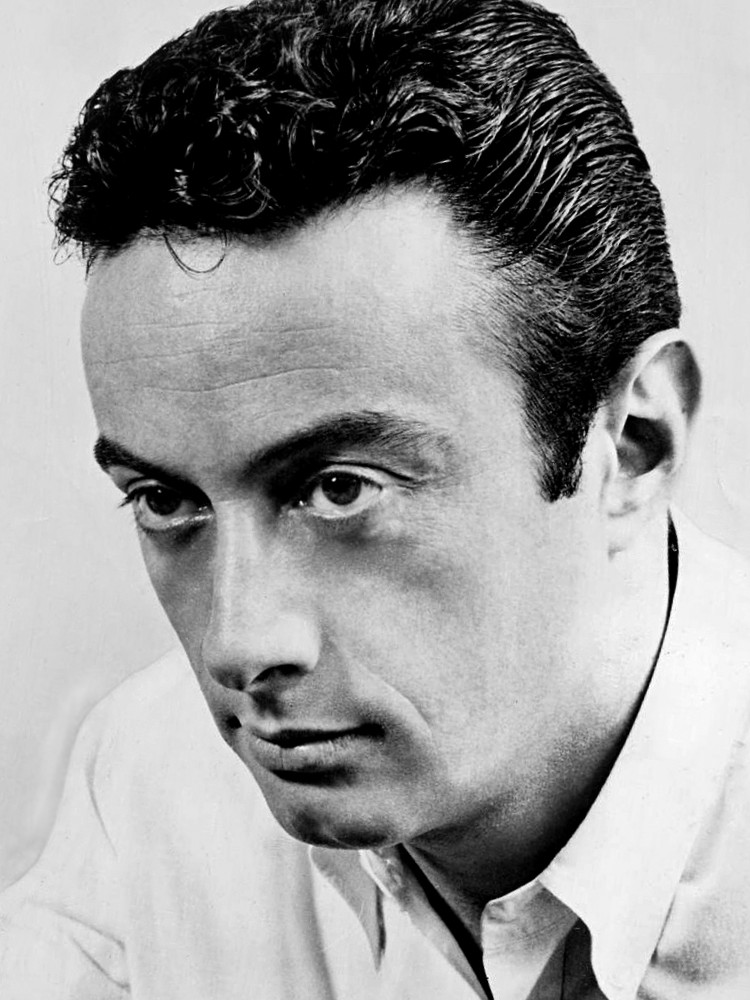
Lenny Bruce

- August 1 – Charles Whitman, American mass murderer (b. 1941)
- August 2 – Renya Mutaguchi, Japanese general (b. 1888)
- August 3 – Lenny Bruce, American comedian (b. 1925)
- August 6 – Cordwainer Smith, American author (b. 1913)
- August 12 – Artur Alliksaar, Estonian poet (b. 1923)
- August 15
  - Jan Kiepura, Polish tenor and actor (b. 1902)
  - Seena Owen, American actress (b. 1894)
- August 17 – Ken Miles, British sports car racing engineer and driver (b. 1918)
- August 19 – Fritz Bleyl, German painter (b. 1880)
- August 23 – Francis X. Bushman, American actor (b. 1883)
- August 24
  - Tadeusz Bór-Komorowski, Polish general and statesman, 33rd Prime Minister of Poland (b. 1895)
  - Lao She, Chinese author (b. 1899)
  - Vicente Mejía Colindres, 29th President of Honduras (b. 1878)
- August 26
  - Art Baker, American actor (b. 1898)
  - W. W. E. Ross, Canadian geophysicist and poet (b. 1894)

=== September ===
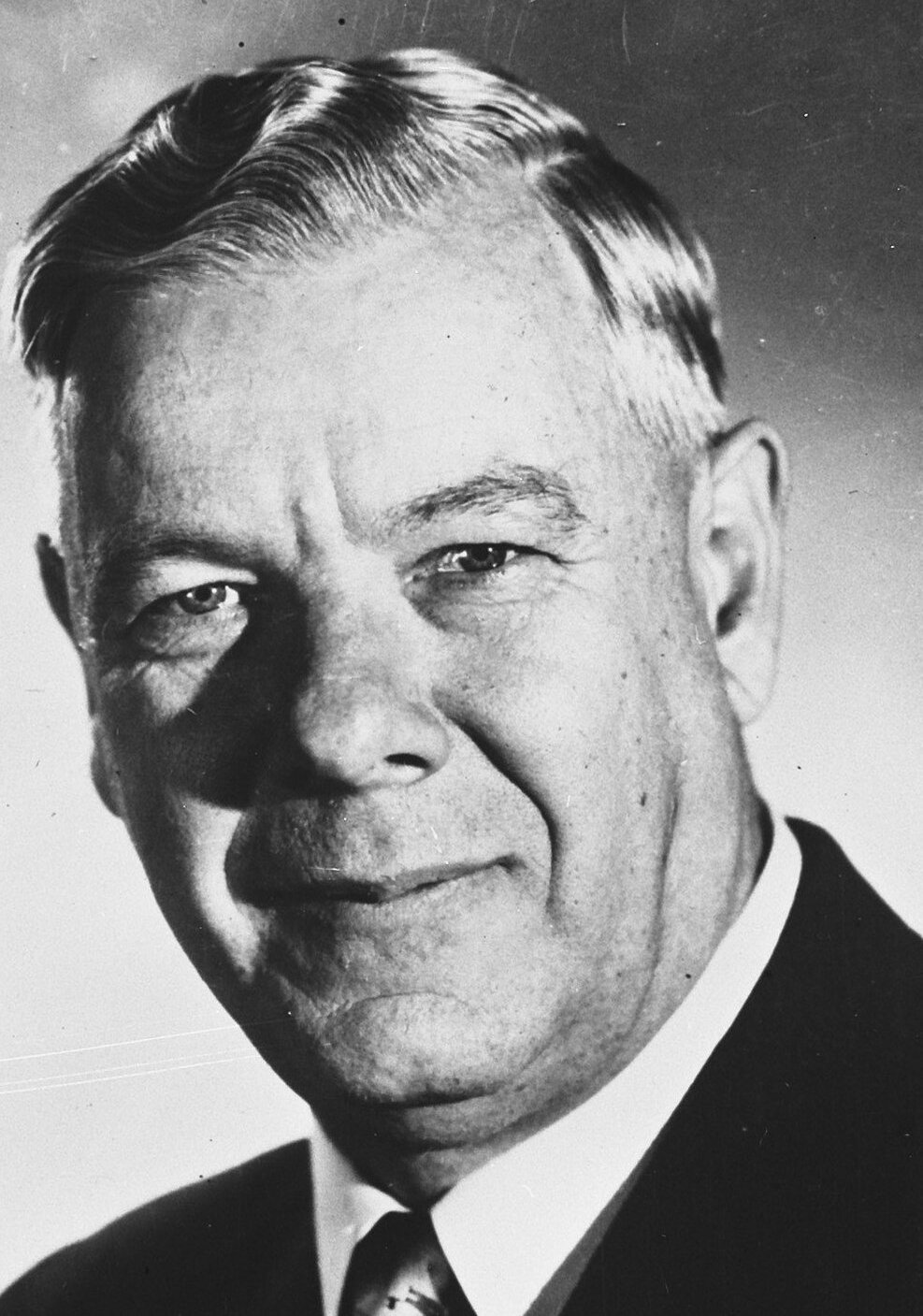
Hendrik Verwoerd

- September 6
  - Margaret Sanger, American birth control advocate (b. 1879)
  - Hendrik Verwoerd, 2nd Prime Minister of South Africa (b. 1901)
- September 9 – Nestor Paiva, American actor (b. 1905)
- September 11 – Collett E. Woolman, American airline executive (b. 1889)
- September 14
  - Gertrude Berg, American actress (b. 1899)
  - Hiram Wesley Evans, American Ku Klux Klan Imperial Wizard (b. 1881)
  - Cemal Gürsel, Turkish general and statesman, 10th Prime Minister of Turkey and 4th President of Turkey (b. 1894)
- September 17 – Fritz Wunderlich, German tenor (b. 1930)
- September 19 – Vladimir Grigoryevich Fyodorov, Soviet scientist and general (b. 1874)
- September 21 – Paul Reynaud, French lawyer and politician, 77th Prime Minister of France (b. 1878)
- September 26
  - Maghfoor Ahmad Ajazi, Indian Independence activist (b. 1900)
  - Helen Kane, American singer (b. 1904)
- September 28
  - André Breton, French poet and writer (b. 1896)
  - Eric Fleming, American actor (b. 1925)

=== October ===
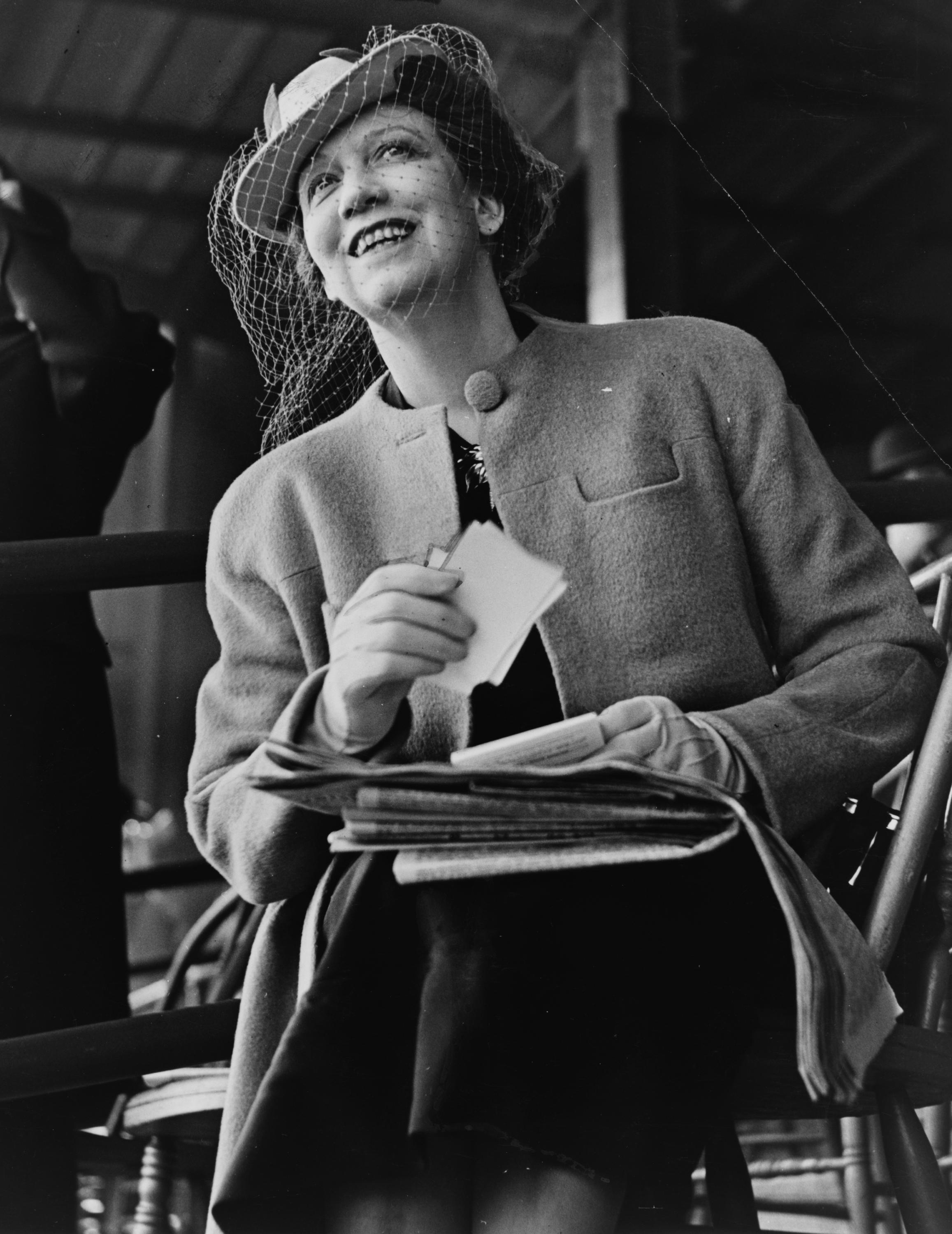
Elizabeth Arden

- October 10
  - Charlotte Cooper, English tennis champion (b. 1870)
  - Wilfrid Lawson, English actor (b. 1900)
- October 13 – Clifton Webb, American actor, dancer and singer (b. 1889)
- October 17 – Cléo de Mérode, French dancer (b. 1875)
- October 18 – Elizabeth Arden, Canadian-born American beautician and cosmetics entrepreneur (b. 1881)
- October 23 – Claire McDowell, American silent screen actress (b. 1877)
- October 24 – Hans Dreier, German art director (b. 1885)
- October 26 – Alma Cogan, English singer (b. 1932)
- October 28 – Robert Charpentier, French Olympic cyclist (b. 1916)

=== November ===
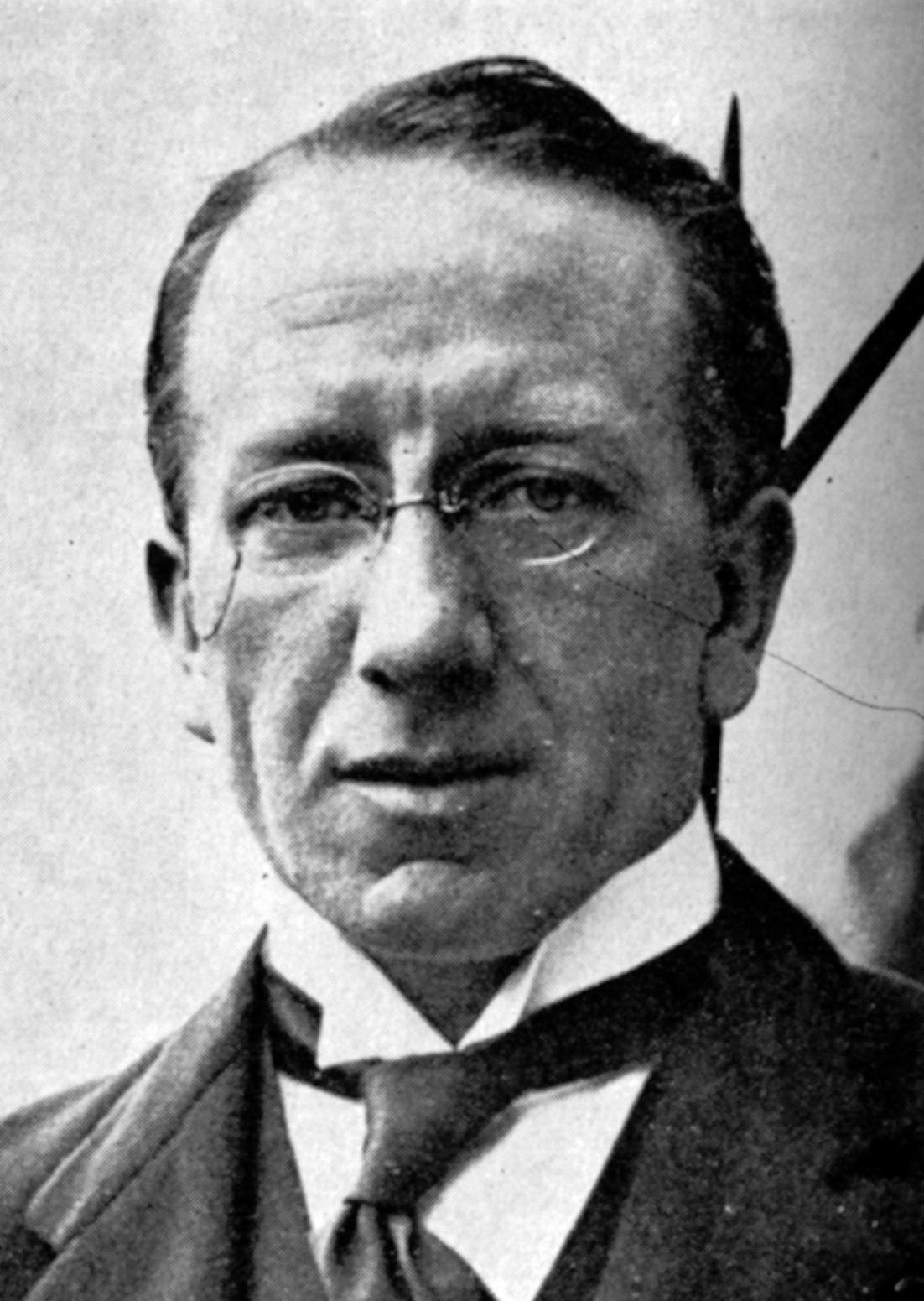
Sean T. O'Kelly

- November 2
  - Peter Debye, Dutch chemist, Nobel Prize laureate (b. 1884)
  - Mississippi John Hurt, African-American singer and guitarist (b. 1893)
- November 5 – Dietrich von Choltitz, Nazi German military governor of Paris in World War II (b. 1894)
- November 8 – Bernhard Zondek, German-born Israeli gynecologist, developer of first reliable pregnancy test (b. 1891)
- November 13 – Esna Boyd, Australian tennis player (b. 1899)
- November 14
  - Steingrímur Steinþórsson, 11th Prime Minister of Iceland (b. 1893)
  - Zengo Yoshida, Japanese admiral (b. 1885)
- November 21 – Władysław Bortnowski, Polish historian and military commander (b. 1891)
- November 23 – Seán T. O'Kelly, 2nd President of Ireland (b. 1882)
- November 26 – Siegfried Kracauer, German writer, sociologist and critic (b. 1889)
- November 28 – Boris Podolsky, Russian-American physicist (b. 1896)

=== December ===
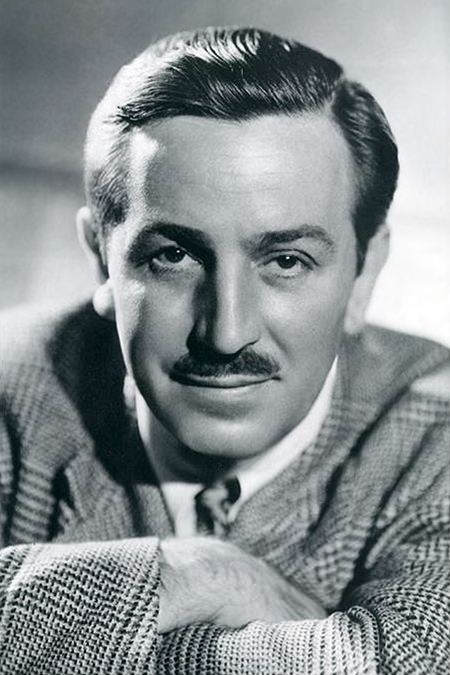
Walt Disney

- December 2 – L.E.J. Brouwer, Dutch mathematician and philosopher (b. 1881)
- December 6 – Juan Natalicio González, Paraguayan poet, 37th President of Paraguay (b. 1897)
- December 14 – Verna Felton, American actress (b. 1890)
- December 15 – Walt Disney, American animated film producer and founder of The Walt Disney Company and Disneyland Resort (b. 1901)
- December 19 – Betty Kuuskemaa, Estonian actress (b. 1879)
- December 22 – Lucy Burns, American women's rights campaigner (b. 1879)
- December 26 – Herbert Gille, SS German general (b. 1897)
- December 27 – Guillermo Stábile, Argentine football player and manager (b. 1905)
- December 30 – Christian Herter, United States Secretary of State (b. 1895)
- December 31 – Nipo T. Strongheart, Native American filmmaker (b. 1891)

== Nobel Prizes ==

- Physics – Alfred Kastler
- Chemistry – Robert S. Mulliken
- Physiology or Medicine – Peyton Rous and Charles Brenton Huggins
- Literature – Shmuel Yosef Agnon and Nelly Sachs
- Peace – not awarded.
