= Grebo people =

Ethnic group in West Africa

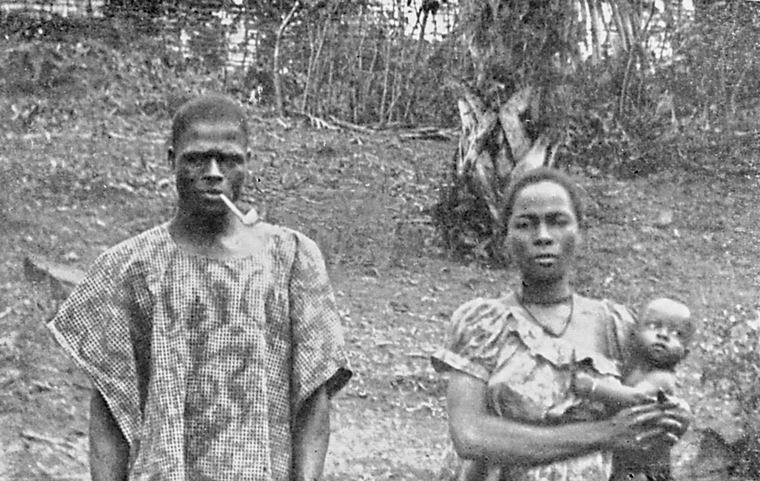
Portrait of Grebo people

The Grebo or Glebo people are an ethnic group or subgroup within the larger Kru group of Africa, a language and cultural ethnicity, and to certain of its constituent elements. Within Liberia members of this group are found primarily in Maryland County and Grand Kru County in the southeastern portion of the country, but also in River Gee County and Sinoe County. The Grebo population in Côte d'Ivoire are known as the Krumen and are found in the southwestern corner of it.

A 2001 estimate of the number of Grebo people in Liberia is approximately 387,000. There are an estimated 48,300 Grebo in Côte d'Ivoire, not counting refugees. Precise numbers are lacking, since many have been displaced by the civil war in Liberia during the late 20th and early 21st century.

The Grebo have a long traditional culture that features ritualistic passages and rituals, as well as shrines and divine beliefs that extend into their creation but are extensions of their ancestors and world around them.

== Definition ==
As early European explorers and Americo-Liberian colonists reached the area of Cape Palmas by sea, the first indigenous group they encountered in the area with whom they established prolonged relations were the Seaside Grebo, or Glebo. The colonists referred to them generally as the Grebo. In the absence of other qualification, the term Grebo has come to refer generally to this group in particular, which has occupied southeastern coastal areas of what is now Liberia.

Considerable ambiguity and imprecision accompany the use of the term Grebo since it is not always clear precisely which group writers or speakers intend to denote. Some of the ambiguity has evolved historically, as the name was generalized from that of the first group contacted by Americo-Liberian colonists in the area that was settled as Maryland County. As colonists used the term to refer to other, lesser-known groups in inland areas, the term became more imprecise, as such groups often belonged to other language families and ethnicities. The confusion has been perpetuated, as Grebo has been used as a cover term for groups in the area that are now known by scholars known to be different but continue to be classified as the same for convenience.

== Language ==
The numerous subgroups of the large and variegated ethnic group, such as the Kru, are defined by linguists referring to a taxonomy of the languages employed by its members. Although there may be archaeological evidence and oral histories, the language classification is often the least confusing frame of reference.

The Grebo ethnic group comprises a community of speakers of speech varieties covering an extensive language continuum punctuated by a collection of cultural centers of gravity, usually town clusters. While the affinity of these varieties is apparent, the internal structure of a classification is often difficult to delineate with any degree of precision.

== History of European (American) contact ==
The indigenous people living at Cape Palmas, who were speakers of Seaside Grebo (Glebo) (as since classified by linguists) were the first to have extensive contact with the American representatives of the Maryland Colonization Society, which organized the colonization of what became known as Maryland in Africa by free African Americans, beginning in 1827.

The Glebo gained sociopolitical ascendancy over neighboring groups from this period, due to their access to Western technology and their alliances with the colonists and Americo-Liberians, the ethnic group that formed from their descendants.

== Attitudes ==
In both the historic and prehistoric periods, frequent armed conflict occurred among the various groups covered by the general label Grebo.

Some inland ethnic groups have longstanding resentment against the Seaside Grebo because of their relationship with the Americo-Liberians, who established dominance because of their relationship to United States groups and trade, as well as advantages of education and technology. First, the inland groups consider the Grebo foolish to have "sold" their traditional lands to the American colonists. Given the influence of the colonial period, the inland groups believe that the Seaside Grebo have allowed their language to become replete with English borrowings, although attempts to control and restrict language have generally been unsuccessful in most regions. Thirdly, in a difference typical between groups that are more or less assimilated in relation to the new people in an area, the inland groups have expressed dismay that the Seaside Grebo abandoned traditional ways to adopt fashions of Liberian or European Americans. For their part, members of the Seaside Grebo have been reported as referring to the up-country groups as "Bush" Grebo, pagan and barbarous.

Since the late 20th century, some of these issues have inspired a pan-Grebo unification sentiment. In its extreme form, it has been part of a political movement to unite virtually all speakers of the sociolinguistic language Grebo in the counties of Maryland, River Gee, and Grand Kru. In its recent form, the movement arose as part of the emergence of "political tribes" (factions) during the civil wars of the late 20th century (First Liberian Civil War and Second Liberian Civil War). They defined themselves against the Americo-Liberian power base. In a sense, this was a continuation of the Grebo wars of the 19th century.

== Culture ==
Grebo society and functions through a male oriented polygamous culture, where the man carries multiple wives in marriage. The father of the house acts as the leader, the one who manages the wealth, and gives commands. Women are considered male property to their husbands. Unique to Grebo though, is the centralization of the age groups and designations in some form overwrite some aspects of traditional African family structure. More pressing clan matters could arise and become priority, which for instance allowed Grebo girls for instance to be less controlled than in other cultures. Girls are encouraged at a young age to find partners, and are given a time period before given the choice to commit to marriage.

Traditional Grebo people had what were known as bush schools (poro for males and sande for females); these and their associated societies have continued to be part of the culture. Historically the poro(s) adapted to new condition by establishing Masonic lodges of the European-American style of fraternal society.

Originally, Grebo clans were led by a high priest, a Bodio, one guided by the gods, but who did not preside physically or even concern himself with mundane issues, and whose needs were cared for by the community. They resided in a home known as a takae, built by his followers, which was his place of seclusion and where he was expected to reside. Should the Bodio make himself present in public, it would be seen as a moment of disorder for society. Contact with women who he at the time of his appointment he was not married to was forbidden, much like his ability to interact with men, and to which physical contact was not allowed at all. The only place where communication was allowed was the takae, and even the wives themselves, known as the Jide, were not to make themselves present to outside, lest she taint or otherwise make any object she is present with taboo. Both the Bodio and Jide wear black attire, and even onto death clans would not bury their bodies, rather drop them into the water to avoid coming into contact with the rest of society.

Grebo women dressed in various colors and designs of lappa cloth.

In Grebo culture, it is common for the ceremonial dress to be lappa, a wrap around cloth that is similar to the material of cloth made from raffia, as opposed to the pants that most common men had access to wear.

Instruments crafted in Liberia serve as a connective tissue between all aspects of communal life. They can act both as communication, entertainment, and can even be used for battle and to signal danger. In the case of the Grebo, they feature some of the largest drums that are painted and carved, and are considered both for the use of their town, as well as for war. To this day, some villages still maintain them for their communicative abilities. The sounds they produce are even classified by the lower hum associated with the concept of male sound, and the higher pitch for the female. These drums can measure up to six or seven feet tall, and are commonly used in pairs, as well as with the use of chairs or mortars to reach the tall instruments. Other pieces like trumpets and horns also carry the ability to signal and communicate to laborers even outside of their common entertainment value.

Ceremonial dance commemorating the dead in traditional costuming accompanied by music.

== Ritual artifacts ==
The Grebo are known for their carved wooden masks, which were worn in ceremonies to mediate or propitiate the spirits. White clay is applied to participants in certain ceremonies, to denote a ku or spirit. Dancers wearing the carved masks are also daubed with it.

Sculpted or carved Grebo figures are uncommon, but Grebo masks are known to be composed of multiple styles and depictions. In some instances, to denote fully grown men, one could create a mask with a much larger head and even horns in some iterations. In contrast to this, the representation of females in mask-making would appear more gentle and with softer features, both compatible iterations regardless having varying geometrically shaped eyes and fully molded naturalistic depictions of lips. Grebo masks are often accompanied with a variety of decorations like nails, beads, cowrie shells, and beads.

Regardless most Grebo masks are not worn to conceal the identity of the wearer, as they are situated to basket-like structures above the head, acting more as a helmet than a covering.They can be adorned with horns or decorated with fibrous material like hair. Masks most often appear at funerals, dances, and most importantly are associated with warriors and warfare, and the representations are meant to embody those members in their designation even into death. They are meant to be striking and scary to their enemies while serving to empower those around them. Even then, the usage of masks compared to other Liberian people is significantly less, and instead reinforces the much greater age classification system. The masks are more for symbolic merit than to be any form of actual manifestation.

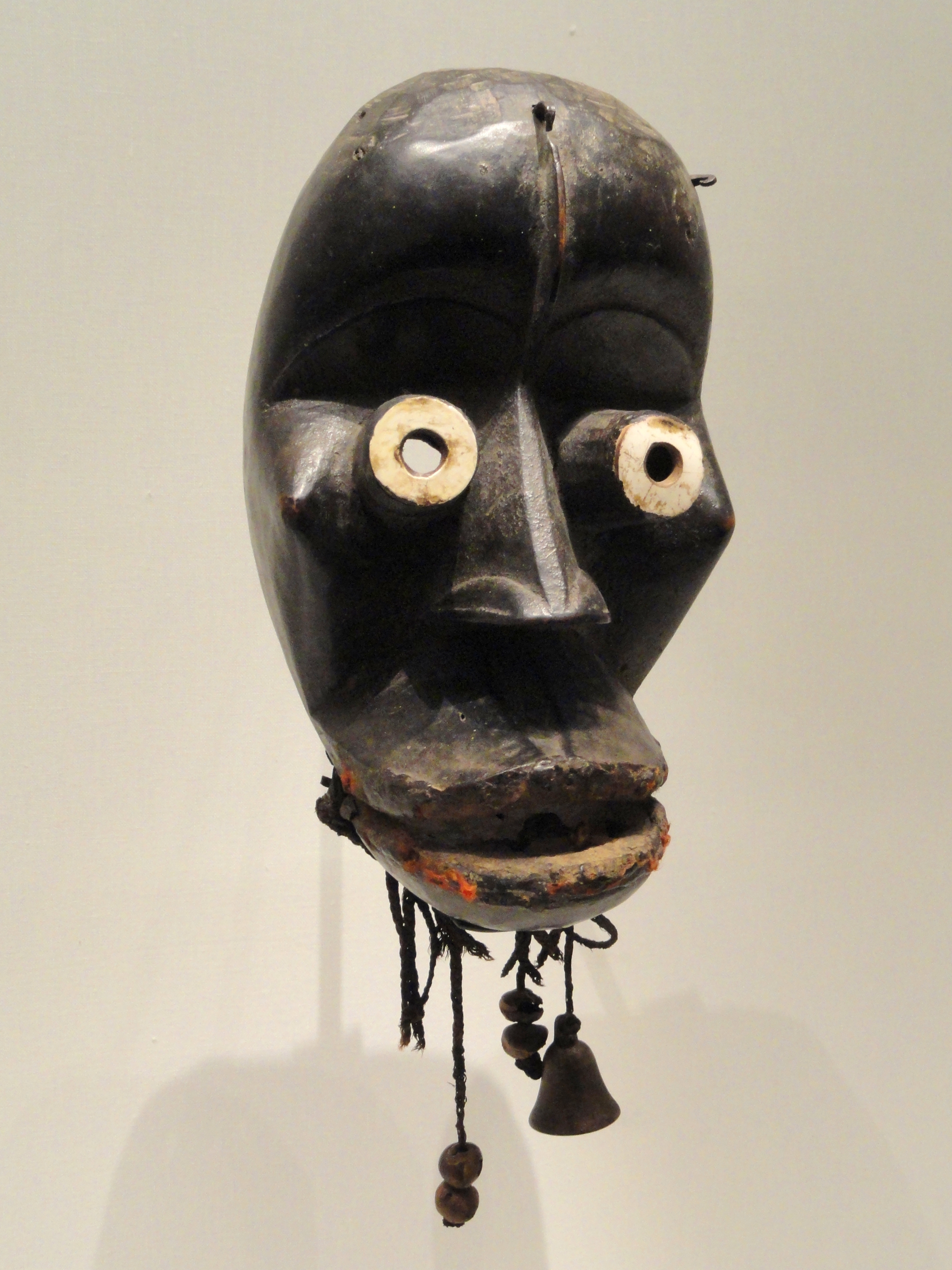
Mask created by the Mano people of Liberia with similar features.

Compared to the more naturalistic masks, the stylized more striking masks could be depicted with carved teeth, round protruding eyes, and a sharp flat extruding nose. Masks could have multiple sets of eyes, a symbolic allusion to their own ancestors. Regarding color, Grebo masks are commonly dyed in a vertical or horizontal halves, both alone by itself and as a canvas to add additional flourishes on top. The colors commonly used are red, black, and white. Some are even distinguished by hard levels that combined separate the mask into different components, a detail which without could be done to emulate a depiction of youth for example.

The maker of any ritual masks were the ones who retained the most in depth information regarding their own forest zone myth culture. They were the highest initiates in their designation, and those members who dawn the mask to perform would do it within the forest, where the rituals and ceremonies take place, only occasionally with the purpose to show outsiders. Otherwise they were meant for their designation and for the initiates to see.

Bodios (ritual priests) often wore a heavy brass ankle ring, which was put on by a blacksmith, and worn to the death. These anklets were considered animate, and regularly fed human blood. Large brass rings more generally were used as ritual objects for protection of entire villages from "spirits, sicknesses, war and other people’s witchcraft" and were reportedly imbued with power via human sacrifice.

- Kru Money

== Divination ==
Local adepts practice divination by scrying, and may use the results of such divination to determine the putative perpetrator of a crime.

The Grebo believe that spirits can exist only in natural objects, therefore historical shrines often use particular natural resources like large rocks as the basis, with medicine and divination, as well as offerings, rituals, and sacrifices. These places are thought to have been created as landmarks by the gods, and the spiritual power believed to persist is their ancestors as well as a variety of deities. Through divination the spirits can be used for prediction, and otherwise the landmarks can be used as a primary meeting place for important community discussion. Offerings like preparing food for the spirits as well as pouring alcohol are done at these sites as well, to appease the spirits as well as give luck and fortune.

Shrines that have been documented often include stools, stones, and even brass rings, known as nitien, speculated to be some form of protective currency and a sacred object that has the capability to punish miscreants at night. Their power to heal and protect was also believed to be possible. It is not clear who or when they were created, and their mythological concept of the discovered artifact being the embodiment of a water spirit is likely associated with their discovery within creeks and rivers, before being given to the appropriate elders for the benefit and protection of the whole village.

== Trial by ordeal ==
A person (usually a woman) accused of witchcraft is tried by ordeal for the determination of guilt by being subjected to the forced imbibition of a decoction of the bark of the sasswood (sassywood) tree/vine (Erythrophleum suaveolens or guineense). If the person dies, they are adjudged guilty. More often than not they die, as sasswood is quite poisonous. According to a Maryland County newspaper, a woman was killed as of 2025 under a similar precedent.

== Exogamy ==
Members of a patrilineal descent group (clan) must find a mate from another clan, under pain of taboo violation. Virilocal residence is the norm.

== Multilingualism ==
A degree of bilingualism / bidialectalism is a common trait among the people, both for the needs of exogamy as well as commercial interaction.

== Bibliography ==
- Hasselbring, Sue, and Eric Johnson. 2002. A Sociolinguistic Survey of the Grebo Language Area of Liberia. SIL International Monograph, 100 pages.
- Moran, Mary H. 1986. "Collective Action and the 'Representation' of African Women: A Liberian Case Study," "Feminist Studies", 15:443-60.
- Moran, Mary H. 1990. "Civilized Women: Gender and Prestige in Southeastern Liberia." Ithaca, NY: Cornell University Press.
- Moran, Mary H. 1992. "Civilized Servants: Child Fosterage and Training for Status Among the Glebo of Liberia." In Hansen, Karen T. (ed.) "African Encounters with Domesticity," 98-115. New Brunswick, NJ: Rutgers University Press.
- Moran, Mary H. 1995. "Warriors or Soldiers? Masculinity and Ritual Transvestisism in the Liberian Civil war." In Sutton, Constance R. (ed.) "Feminism, Nationalism, and Militarism." Arlington, Va.: American Anthropological Association.
- Moran, Mary H. 1996. "Carrying the Queen: Identity and Nationalism in a Liberian Queen Rally. In Cohen, C.B., Stoeltje, B. & R. Wilk (eds.) "Beauty Queens on the Global Stage: Gender, Contests, and Power," 147-60. London: Routledge.
- Moran, Mary H. 2000. "Gender and Aging: Are Women "Warriors" Among the Glebo of Liberia?" "Liberian Studies Journal", 25:25-41.
- Moran, Mary H. 2006. Liberia: The Violence of Democracy. Philadelphia: University of Pennsylvania Press.
- Shakarov, Avner, and Lyubov Shakarov-Senatorova. Traditional African Art: An Illustrated Study. McFarland & Company, Inc., Publishers, 2015.
- Siegmann, William. Rock of the Ancestors:Liberian Art and Material Culture from the Collections of the Africana Museum = Ṉamôa Ko̲n. 1st ed., Liberian Studies, 1977.
- Bacquart, Jean-Baptiste. The Tribal Arts of Africa. Thames and Hudson, 1998.
- Miller, Judith. Tribal Art . 1st ed., DK Pub., 2006.
- Grootaers, Jan-Lodewijk, et al. Visions from the Forests: The Art of Liberia and Sierra Leone. Univ. of Washington Press, 2014.
- Meneghini, Mario. “African Arts.” UCLA James S. Coleman African Studies Center, vol. 8, no. 1, 1974, pp. 36-39–87, doi:JSTOR.
- Shakarov, Avner, and Lyubov Shakarov-Senatorova. Encyclopedia: Art of Africa. Volume 1. Austin Macauley Publishers, 2019.
- Nevin, Timothy. “Devil Rock (Tulė), a Seaside Nyomowe Grebo Shrine of Historical Importance.” Liberian Studies Journal, vol. 38, no. 1, 2013, pp. 1–31, doi:EBSCO.
