= Chom Dong =

Private estate and botanical garden in Thailand

Coordinates: 12.5620°N 99.9411°E

Chom Dong is a private estate and botanical garden near Hua Hin, Prachuap Khiri Khan Province, Thailand. It is not open to the public aside from infrequent special events.

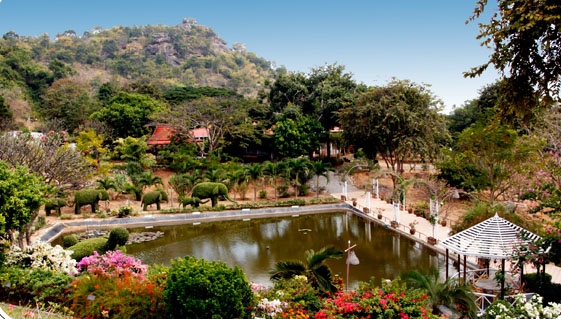
Chom Dong Villa and Garden

Chom Dong Villa sits on 40 rai (6.4 hectares) of undulating land on the lower slopes of Khao Hin Lek Fai National Park. Its setting, with a backdrop of hills to the north and northwest, provides the garden with its own microclimate quite different from Hua Hin town, two kilometres to the east.

== The garden ==
There are currently over 300 different plant species in the garden, and the number continues to grow. Some are native to the original forest. The garden includes: "sarapee" Mammea siamensis; "ked" Mimusops hexandra Roxb.; Angsana "pradu baan" Pterocarpus macrocarpus; several species of fig (Ficus); elephant apple "ma'tard" Dillenia indica; Siamese Neem Tree "sadao" Azadirachta indica A.; Singapore Almond "hoo kwang" Terminalia catappa; "oy chang" Lannea coromandelica Merr., "sark" Erythrophleum succirubrum Gagnep.; tamarind "makaam" Tamarindus indica; and various Lagerstroemia. Some have been planted since the main villa was built, including fruit trees such as mango, coconut, and star fruit, the large teak Tectona grandis behind Chom Dong Villa, Rain Tree "jarm-juri" Samanea saman; Song of India Dracaena reflexa; and the yellow-flowering Copper Pod "nonsri" Peltophorum pterocarpum Back ex Heyne.

Over the years, more plants, shrubs and trees have been added. Many have been chosen to withstand the occasional long dry spells, and include bougainvillea "feung fa"; various species of frangipani ("lantom"); Desert Rose ("chuan chom") Adenium obesum and Lantana "paka-krong" Viburnum lantana. Also thriving are Leadwort "payapmork" Plumbago; yellow "barnburi" Allamanda cathartica; Purple Bignonia "muang maneerat" Bignonia magnifica (syn. Saritaea magnifica); various cassias; Purple Orchid Tree "chong-koh see muang" Bauhinia variegata; Barometer Bush "neon" Leucophyllum frutescens (Berland) I. M. Johnst. with magenta flowers; different types of palm trees and Dragon Tree "chan par" Dracaena loureire Gagnep.

The garden's plants flower in three distinct seasons. They are:

- Cool, dry season (November to February)
- Hot season (March to June)
- Rainy season (July to October)

== Local fauna ==
In the rainy season, bird life is most abundant. The red-wattled lapwing can be heard with its distinctive cry which has given rise to its Thai name "kratae-tae-waed", and Hoopoe, even the occasional kingfisher or egret frequent the water’s edge. Wild fowl comes down from the hill. More common are magpies and turtle doves. Owls and nightjars can be heard in the evenings.

The lower reservoir in particular is a breeding ground for species of frogs and toads and after a rainfall their sounds reach a symphonic level. They also attract snakes. Other garden residents include cicadas, species of butterflies and other insects, such as emerald jewel beetles, while the villa is home to geckos which are found in all parts of Thailand.

Keeping a watchful eye on all this are the villa's Thai dogs, adopted when they were abandoned at a nearby wat. When the mango trees are laden with fruit, around March, they are joined by a troop of macaques who make their home in a cave on Khao Hin Lek Fai.

== The villa ==
The grounds consist of three adjacent properties: the central Chom Dong Villa, and the later additions of Nornnon Villa to the southeast, and Cherngkhao Villa to the northeast. Khao Hin Lek Fai National Park forms the north and northwest boundaries.

The main villa is a long, simple two-storey structure facing east towards the sea, visible on a clear day. The upper storey is surrounded by a wide veranda typical of old Hua Hin seaside residences. The other two villas, Nornnon and Cherngkao, are single-storey bungalows. There is also a children's treehouse on a tamarind tree near Nornnon.

Chom Dong has a brick-surfaced open space for cooking "gai-ob-fang" (chicken baked in straw), a specialty of the house. Bales of rice straw are kept for this purpose, as are stacks of seasoned firewood for the pizza oven.

=== History of the villa ===
On November 30, 1975, the foundation stone was laid for a "pra tamnak" or royal villa, named "Chom Dong ("woodland vista") by HM Queen Ramphaiphanni, consort of HM King Rama VII. This became her country retreat during the last years of her life. Here she spent many months at a time. There were visits by members of the royal family from Klai Kangwol Palace in Hua Hin. She regularly played a few holes of golf at the nearby Royal Hua Hin Golf Course.

The villa stood in peaceful isolation during its first two decades, but lately houses and residential communities began to spring up nearby as Hua Hin expanded. The road to the villa has been widened and extended up Khao Hin Lek Fai where a public garden and several viewpoints have been built. These developments have changed the ambience of the garden somewhat, but the grounds are extensive enough to maintain privacy and continue to be a sanctuary for plants and wildlife.

=== Sports and leisure ===
In recent months a 9-hole 735 yard par-3 golf course and an archery range have been added to Chom Dong. Hua Hin is known for its golf courses. There is a full-size golf course next door, Royal Hua Hin Golf Course, a mature links-style course from the 1920s. It is Thailand's oldest golf course and still one of the best. Nearby are a dozen international standard golf courses, such as Palm Hills, Black Mountain, and Majestic Creek. All are open to the public.

There are numerous leisure activities at Chom Dong, both within the villa and in the garden. Hua Hin Beach is only a few minutes drive away. Within the main villa is a billiards room and a table football table for eight players. The wooden players have been customised to wear the colours of two of Bangkok's top universities. There is an extensive library in Chom Dong Villa and also in Baan Cherngkao. Hua Hin is 10 degrees north of the Equator and despite worsening light pollution in recent years, it is still possible to enjoy stargazing at night. A large collection of toys have accumulated over the past three generations, including steam engines and electric trains.
