= J. Milton Turner School =

Historic former school building

- U.S. National Register of Historic Places
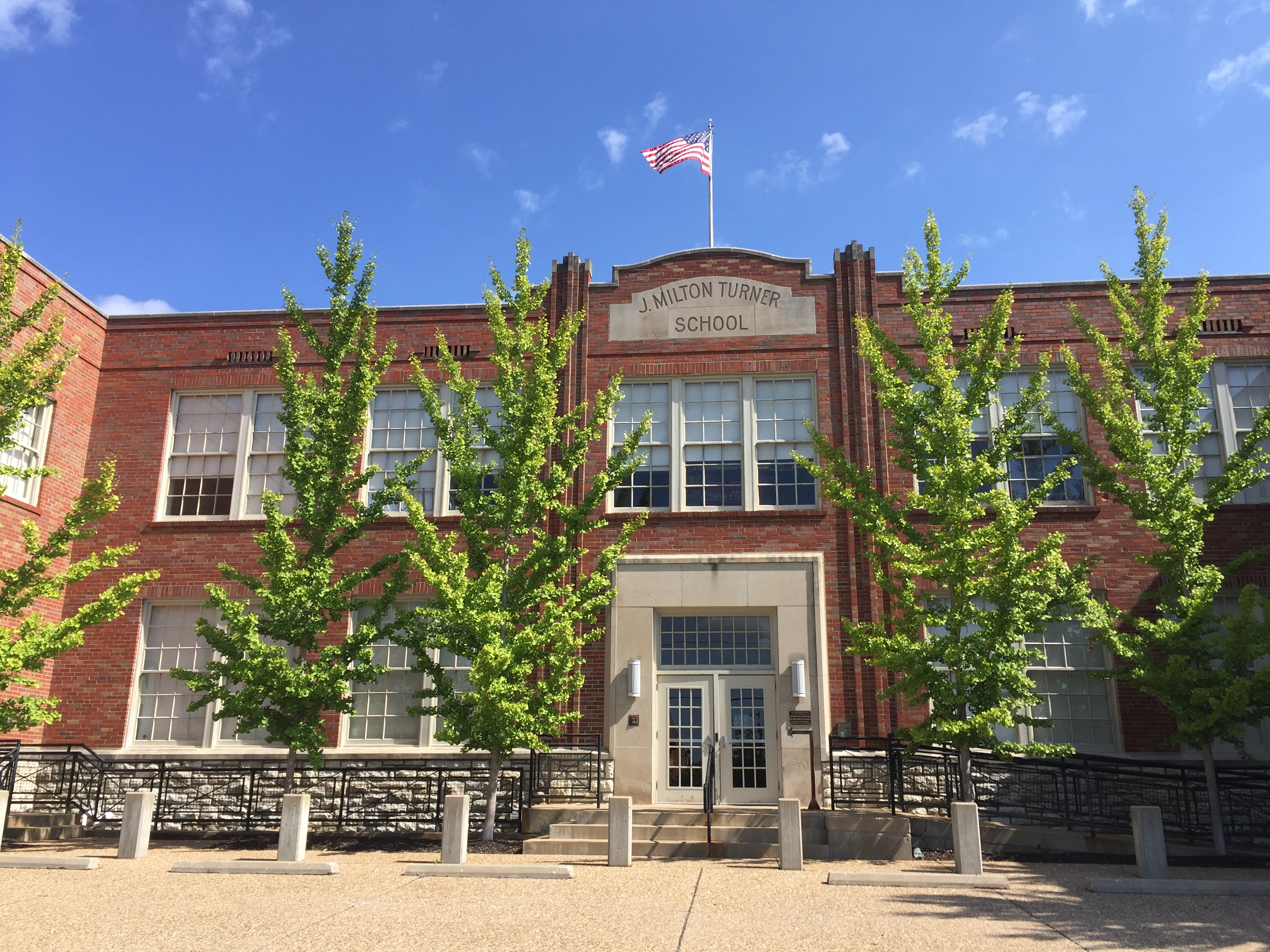
- J. Milton Turner School in 2017.

- Location within Missouri Location within the United States
- Location: 238 Meacham Ave., and 245 Saratoga Ave, Kirkwood, Missouri
- Coordinates: 38°33′52″N 90°24′9.56″W
- Architect: Bonsack & Pearce
- Architectural style: August 22, 2002
- NRHP reference No.: 02000905

J. Milton Turner School, originally Meacham Park School, is a historic former school building in the Meacham Park neighborhood of Kirkwood, Missouri outside St. Louis. It served African American students during segregation and was named for James Milton Turner. The building is listed on the National Register of Historic Places in August 22, 2002, for its contribution to African American and educational history.

== History ==
The school was opened in 1925 with an enrollment of 230 students. It is a two-story U-shaped brick building. The original wooden building of the school was demolished after two brick buildings were constructed, the first in 1937 (north section) and the second in 1948 (U-shaped south front of the building), establishing the school current exterior form. Both parts of the school were designed by Bonsack & Pearce.

It was closed in the 1976–1977 school year, in response to a federally mandated push to address racial isolation in the Kirkwood School District. The school building has been advertised as the Turner Office Lots. On June 12, 2021, the Kirkwood School District announced that it intends to purchase the building for use as its administrative services center (to house the offices of the district's administrators) and subsequently continue to rent the rest of the building to existing tenants. The move will increase the district's presence in the Meacham Park neighborhood and allow the district's current Administrative Services Center on the campus of North Kirkwood Middle School to be replaced with eight classrooms for students.

The other school for African Americans in the area, Booker T. Washington, was closed in 1950 and demolished. It has been converted into an office building.

== In media ==
A photograph of the school was included in a report on educational discrimination in St. Louis. KETC aired a segment on the school as part of its Living St. Louis Series. The St. Louis Business Journal reported in 2006 that the building underwent $20 million in renovations.

== See also ==
- National Register of Historic Places listings in St. Louis County, Missouri
