= Erythrophleine =

Names
- IUPAC name (1S,4aR,4bS,7E,8R,8aS,9S,10aR)-Tetradecahydro-9-hydroxy-1,4a,8-trimethyl-7-[2-[2-(methylamino)ethoxy]-2-oxoethylidene]-1-phenanthrenecarboxylic acid methyl ester
- Other names: Norcassamidine

Identifiers
CAS Number	36150-73-9
3D model (JSmol)	Interactive image
ChemSpider	32701236
PubChem CID	76961570
UNII	UVD3Q9V368
CompTox Dashboard (EPA)	DTXSID60878666
- InChI: InChI=1S/C24H39NO5/c1-15-16(13-20(27)30-12-11-25-4)7-8-17-21(15)18(26)14-19-23(17,2)9-6-10-24(19,3)22(28)29-5/h13,15,17-19,21,25-26H,6-12,14H2,1-5H3/b16-13+/t15-,17-,18-,19+,21-,23+,24-/m0/s1 Key: COAPCKUZMKOWBC-ZEJGPHSTSA-N
- SMILES: C[C@@H]\1[C@H]2[C@H](CC/C1=C\C(=O)OCCNC)[C@]3(CCC[C@]([C@@H]3C[C@@H]2O)(C)C(=O)OC)C

Properties
Chemical formula	C_{24}H_{39}NO_{5}
Molar mass	421.578 g·mol^{−1}
Appearance	White, crystalline powder
Melting point	115
Solubility in water	Miscible
- Except where otherwise noted, data are given for materials in their standard state (at 25 °C [77 °F], 100 kPa). Infobox references

Erythrophleine is a complex alkaloid and ester of tricyclic diterpene acids derived from many of the plants in the genus Erythrophleum. A highly toxic compound, it is most commonly known for its use in West African trials by ordeal. Exposure to erythrophleine can quickly lead to ataxia, dyspnea, heart paralysis, and sudden death. Visible effects of erythrophleine poisoning include induced terror, labored and irregular breathing, convulsions, urination, and vomiting.

== Mechanism of action ==
Once ingested, erythrophleine primarily acts on the body by disrupting the nervous system. It does this by inhibiting Na-K ATPase, an enzyme that breaks down ATP to generate an electric potential by moving sodium and potassium ions against their concentration gradient. In vertebrates, this potential is used to transmit signals across neural synapses. Normally, sodium-potassium pumps move potassium ions into the nerve cell and sodium ions out, but studies have shown that exposure to erythrophleine reduces this action dramatically. This can have a number of compounding effects including weakened nerve signaling responses and inhibited ability to maintain cellular homeostasis.

While the exact mechanism of this process is unknown, it is likely similar to that of cardiac glycosides. Cardiac glycosides inhibit Na-K ATPase by stabilizing it in the E2-P transition state, preventing sodium ions from being extruded. They do this by mimicking potassium and tightly binding to Na-K ATPase at the potassium active site. The most well-known of these molecules is the active toxin in foxglove.

== Use as an ordeal poison ==
Erythrophleine's primary use is as a toxin in ancient West African ordeal trials, called sassywood. The process has largely been outlawed, but due to the limited judicial infrastructure of some West African states, ordeal trials still take place with some regularity. Some prominent economists have even argued that sassywood is a more effective substitute to Liberian courts, given the decrepit nature of the country's judicial system.

The main trial consists of creating a poisonous brew derived from the bark of the sasswood tree and administering it to the accused. In order to create the drink, bark of the ordeal tree was simply scraped, powdered, added to water, and allowed to steep. However, many cultures added additional ingredients to the mixture that made the final recipe much more complicated. Once consumed, if the defendant fails to throw up all of the poison before it enters their system, they are pronounced guilty and the poison likely kills them. On the other hand, if they manage to throw up all of the poison and maintain full control of their limbs, then they are cleared of any wrongdoing.
