= Erythrophleum couminga =

Scientific classification
- Kingdom: Plantae
- Clade: Tracheophytes
- Clade: Angiosperms
- Clade: Eudicots
- Clade: Rosids
- Order: Fabales
- Family: Fabaceae
- Subfamily: Caesalpinioideae
- Genus: Erythrophleum
- Species: E. couminga

Binomial name
- Erythrophleum couminga Baill.

Species of tree native to Madagascar

Erythrophleum couminga is a species of leguminous tree in the genus Erythrophleum. It is endemic to the western coastal region of Madagascar, occurring in the Baie de Baly National Park. The bark is used in traditional medicine and the branches are used for fencing posts.

== Description ==
Erythrophleum couminga is a moderate-sized deciduous tree which grows to a height of up to 20 m (66 ft). The trunk has rough, fissured bark and the twigs are downy when young. The leaves are compoundly bipinnate with two to four pairs of pinnae. Each pinna has a 2 to 6 cm (0.8 to 2.4 in) petiole, a rachis up to 20 cm (8 in) long, and eight to twelve alternate leaflets with rounded bases and acute apexes. The inflorescence is a loose panicle growing in a leaf axil. The individual flowers are small, bisexual and cream-coloured with parts in fives. They are followed by flat, woody, dangling pods measuring around 20 by 5 cm (8 by 2 in), containing four or more disc-like seeds.

== Distribution and habitat ==
This tree is endemic to Madagascar; its range extends for about 400 km (250 mi) along the western coast of the country in a strip around 40 km (25 mi) wide, and not occurring more than 600 m (2,000 ft) above sea level. It grows in mixed deciduous woodland and wooded savannas, in association with palm trees, preferring sandy soils.

== Uses ==
The timber of this tree is durable and resistant to rot but is little used apart from making fencing posts. The foliage is poisonous to cattle, and the flowers and the bark are even more toxic. The bark contains complex diterpenoid alkaloids and is powdered and used in traditional medicine in very small quantities as a laxative. In larger quantities, an extract of the bark is a powerful, cardiac poison, rapidly causing shortness of breath, convulsions and cardiac arrest. In the past, the bark has been used as a poison in trials by ordeal, a custom continuing in Madagascar into the mid-nineteenth century.
