= Cassaine =

Names
- IUPAC name 2-(Dimethylamino)ethyl [13(15)E]-3β-hydroxy-14α-methyl-7-oxo-17-norpimar-13(15)-en-16-oate
- Systematic IUPAC name 2-(Dimethylamino)ethyl (E)-[(1R,4aS,4bR,7S,8aR,10aS)-7-hydroxy-1,4b,8,8-tetramethyl-10-oxododecahydrophenanthren-2(1H)-ylidene]acetate

Identifiers
CAS Number	468-76-8
3D model (JSmol)	Interactive image
ChEBI	CHEBI:3454
ChemSpider	4444673
PubChem CID	5281267
UNII	PQK203C49T
CompTox Dashboard (EPA)	DTXSID00878665
- InChI: InChI=1S/C24H39NO4/c1-15-16(13-21(28)29-12-11-25(5)6)7-8-17-22(15)18(26)14-19-23(2,3)20(27)9-10-24(17,19)4/h13,15,17,19-20,22,27H,7-12,14H2,1-6H3/b16-13+/t15-,17-,19-,20-,22-,24+/m0/s1 Key: GMHWATCMBXIANN-IOJUAHGHSA-N
- SMILES: C[C@@H]\1[C@H]2[C@H](CC/C1=C\C(=O)OCCN(C)C)[C@]3(CC[C@@H](C([C@@H]3CC2=O)(C)C)O)C

Properties
Chemical formula	C_{24}H_{39}NO_{4}
Molar mass	405.579 g·mol^{−1}
- Except where otherwise noted, data are given for materials in their standard state (at 25 °C [77 °F], 100 kPa). Infobox references

Cassaine is a toxic compound found within the tree genus Erythrophleum. This genus has a range from Senegal to Sudan and Kenya in the east, and south to Zimbabwe and Mozambique. Cassaine was first isolated by the G. Dalma group in 1935 from the Erythrophleum guinneese tree. Since ancient times cassaine has been used as an ordeal poison by African tribes. It has also been utilized extensively as an arrow poison by the Casamance people of Senegal.

== Structure ==
The structure of cassaine and other alkaloids found within the genus Erythrophleum are similar to the structure of cardiac glycosides. This similarity to cardiac glycosides accounts for the similarity in cardiac activity between cassaine and compounds such as digitoxin. Generally, the structure of cassaine and other Erythrophleum derivatives are considered N-alkylaminoethyl esters of tricyclic diterpene acids containing a perhydrophenanthrene skeleton.

== Mechanism of action ==
Cassaine's biological function stems from its ability to interact with Na^{+}-K^{+} ATPase through its cardiotonic steroid binding site. The binding of cassaine to this site inhibits ATPase. Cassaine can be defined as a specific inhibitor of monovalent cation transport and of Na^{+}-K^{+} ATPase; the result being an inotropic effect on cardiac muscle.

== Toxicity ==
Cassaine is highly toxic because it acts strongly on the function of the heart by affecting Na^{+}-K^{+} ATPase. High doses can cause blood pressure problems, bradycardia, violent fits of vomiting, arrhythmia, and death. While used widely in Africa for various reasons, cassaine is usually utilized with other alkaloidal compounds from its parent tree. Since mixtures are usually used it is hard to directly gauge its toxicity from the use of these mixtures. Despite the difficulty, Some examples of the toxicity of several mixtures are available. For instance, the arrow poison used by the Casamance people of Senegal; it was found by that any hunter who accidentally cut themselves with a poisoned broad-head was seen to die soon, after violent fits of vomiting.

Animal	LD_{50} (mg cassaine per kg body mass)
Guinea pig	2.64
Cat	1.70
Rat	7.2
Mouse	2.05

The lack of widespread use and research in the western world has resulted in the a lack of information with regards to how toxic is to the human body.

== Uses ==
=== Ordeal poison ===
Native Africans have used cassaine and mixtures containing cassaine as an ordeal poison for hundreds of years. These uses included trials for supposed witches and warlocks. Cassaine was also used for mass cleansings after epidemics, wars, natural disasters, etc. Anything that could have been deemed the work of evil forces brought about by an evil person could have brought an ordeal trial and the use of cassaine. Cassaine use as an ordeal poison caused nearly 2,000 deaths in 1912 [reference]. To this day cassaine is still used in Africa as an ordeal poison.

=== Traditional medicine ===
Cassaine and the other alkaloids from Erythrophleum were used on many occasions by native Africans to treat a variety of ailments. Some of these ailments were headaches, heart problems, and migraines. Cassaine was also used as a strong local anesthetic, diuretic, and as an antidote for the swallowing of other poisonous substances due to its powerful emetic effects. Prior to and until the 1930s, cassaine and its partner alkaloids were used as local anesthetics in dental and ophthalmic procedures.

== Synthesis ==
Cassaine can be prepared by organic synthesis. One method starting from carvone uses anionic polycyclization as a key step.

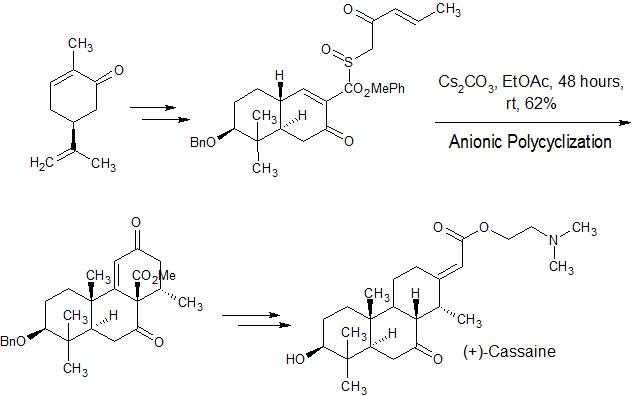
One synthesis method for cassaine. A cardiac poison found within some African trees.
