= Milton Turner =

Milton Turner may refer to:

- Milt Turner (1930-1993), American jazz drummer
- James Milton Turner (1840-1915), American political leader and diplomat
