= Bonsack and Pearce =

Bonsack & Pearce was an architectural firm in St. Louis, Missouri in the United States. It was a partnership between Frederick Charles Bonsack III and Harvey J. Pearce. Several of their buildings are listed on the National Register of Historic Places (NRHP).

Bonsack's father, also named Frederick C. Bonsack (1859 - 1917), was a builder and architect. Bonsack III worked at his father's firm and served in the U.S. Navy during World War I. He then partnered with Pearce.

Pearce's younger brother Robert joined the firm. After the younger Bonsack died in 1953 the firm became Pearce & Pearce.

== Work ==
- Masonic Temple (Kirksville, Missouri) (1927), NRHP listed
- Wheatley Public School (1928) at 921 Garfield Street in Poplar Bluff, Missouri, NRHP listed
- J. Milton Turner School at 238 Meacham Avenue and 245 Saratoga Avenue in Meacham Park, Kirkwood, Missouri, NRHP listed
- Drs. George and Blanche Laughlin House (1937), NRHP listed
- Washington School (1937) at 529 South Locust Street Monroe City, Missouri, NRHP listed
- Audrain County Courthouse (1951) 101 N. Jefferson St. Mexico, MO, NRHP listed
- Osage Hills School at 1110 Glenwood S, NRHP listed
- Affton High School at 8520 Mackenzie Road in Affton, Missouri, NRHP listed

== See also ==
- National Register of Historic Places listings in St. Louis County, Missouri
