= Kirkwood School District =

School district in Missouri

Coordinates: 38.600458°N 90.419200°W

Location
- Kirkwood, Missouri St. Louis County United States
- Coordinates: 38.600458, -90.419200

District information
- Type: Local school district
- Grades: K-12
- Superintendent: Kenneth Roumpos
- Asst. superintendent(s): Liz Grana, Brian Rich, Matt Bailey
- Schools: 9
- Budget: $84,245,000 (2015-16)
- NCES District ID: 2916770

Students and staff
- Students: 6115 (2018-19)
- Teachers: 389.66 FTE
- Staff: 380.19 FTE
- Student–teacher ratio: 15.69
- Athletic conference: Suburban XII (South)
- District mascot: Pioneers
- Colors: Red and White

Other information
- Website: www.kirkwoodschools.org

The Kirkwood R-7 School District is a public school district headquartered in Kirkwood, Missouri.

== History ==
=== History of the district ===
==== 1833–1866: The beginning ====
The area that would become the city of Kirkwood was settled in 1833. The area's residents were educated by the state's public school system and not by a local school district. Public education took place under the State Constitution of 1820, which allowed for the education of the poor at public expense. Black children were not included, because an 1847 state law prohibited teaching African American or bi-racial people how to read and write.

State legislators approved the establishment of the Kirkwood School District on February 17, 1865, three days before approving the charter that established the city. The school district encompassed a larger tract of land than the city. Later, this difference would allow the district to educate all its Black children outside of city limits for a period of time.

The school district was established in the middle of a series of actions in the state legislature that affected the education of Black children. Earlier, in January 1865, Missouri had outlawed slavery and freed enslaved people. (The federal Emancipation Proclamation of 1863 had not applied to Missouri.) In June of that year, the state constitution was revised to permit the establishment of separate public schools for children of African descent.

The topic of racial segregation in Missouri's public education system would arise repeatedly. An 1866 state law did not merely permit it but instead required such segregation. The requirement would become codified in the state's Constitution of 1875. In 1890, the Missouri Supreme Court affirmed that racial segregation in public schools is neither forbidden nor in conflict with the Fourteenth Amendment to the U.S. Constitution. The practice was upheld by the U.S. Supreme Court in the context of racially segregated separate but equal public facilities in the case of Plessy v. Ferguson 163 U.S. 537 (1896). The requirement was repeated in the state Constitution of 1945, which permitted racial integration if other laws required it. Despite the 1954 Brown v. Board of Education decision of the U.S. Supreme Court that outlawed racial segregation in America's public schools, the provision requiring such racial segregation would not be removed from Missouri's Constitution until August 1976.

==== 1866–1908: The first buildings ====
The district's first school building—a temporary one—opened in the fall of 1866. For White students only, the building covered all grades. The district's African American children were educated in rented rooms. A.G. Edwards, founder of his namesake company, and A.S. Mermod had found the land and made the arrangements for erecting the temporary building.

In 1869, the district erected a more permanent schoolhouse for its White students. Called the Jefferson Avenue School, the building was designed by E.E. Halsey and was located on Jefferson Street between Clay and Harrison Streets.

Construction of the first permanent building for African American children was finished in 1870. Ultimately named the Booker T. Washington School, the school was located at 430 West Adams Avenue near what would become Geyer Road in an area whose residents included Edwards. The school educated children from the 11 Black enclaves within Kirkwood and its surrounds. Students—both Black and White—who lived in Meacham Park, an unincorporated area south of Kirkwood City proper, had to walk almost 2 1/2 miles and cross train tracks to get to the school buildings.

1876, the year after the state constitution was changed to require racial segregation in public education and not merely permit it, two rooms costing $1,600 were added to the Jefferson school, and an addition costing $700 was added to the Booker T. Washington School.

In 1888, the district built a dedicated high school for White students. Called the Adams School, the new facility was located on Adams Avenue near the Jefferson School, which then became the Jefferson Elementary School. The high school offered a two-year course of study for students completing the elementary grades. In 1896, the district established the first four-year course of high school study in St. Louis County. Before then, White students who wanted to attend high school had go to Central High School in St. Louis City, first located at 15th Street and Olive Boulevard and then at Garrison and Natural Bridge. A high school education in Kirkwood was not available to children of color.

In 1908, the Katherine Tracy Kindergarten was opened; it was the first Kindergarten in the area. Tracy was a Kirkwood resident who taught in the public school system in St. Louis city and was instrumental in getting the facility established.

==== 1908–1930: Racial advocacy and expansions ====
In 1908, concerned families living south of the Frisco train tracks requested of the school board that a school be established in the Meacham Park area so that young children would not have to walk miles and cross train tracks to get to school. In response, the district established the Meacham Park Branch School District and the Meacham Park School–for the neighborhood's White students only. Located in a small rented house south of the entrance to Oak Hill Cemetery, the school opened in 1908. One source says its White students numbered 14, while another source says its White students numbered sixty-six as of 1911. The neighborhood's 52 Black children still had to walk the almost 2 1/2 miles to the Booker T. Washington school.

African American parents living in the Meacham Park area approached the school board later in 1908 and again in 1909 and 1910, requesting that a school for their children be built closer to where they lived. The district declined to do so.

Overcrowding was occurring at the Jefferson Elementary School, so the district educated some students in a portable building on the school's grounds while two additional schools for White children were being designed and built. As of 1911, the district had a high school with an accredited four-year program, the grammar school, a portable building and a Kindergarten on the grounds of the grammar school, a school for children of color on Adams Avenue, and a one-room school in Meacham Park.

The district ultimately heeded the requests of African American parents from Meacham Park, and on September 19, 1911, it opened the Meacham Park School of Negroes in a one-room house at the east end of New York Street. Conditions at the facility deteriorated and overcrowding occurred, and the school closed during World War I.

The district's John Pitman School, designed by architect William B. Ittner (a thirty-third degree Mason), opened in 1914. The Henry Hough School, with students from first through fourth grades, opened in 1915. The former was named after a physician who was also a president of the board of education, and the latter was named after a secretary and treasurer of the board. Pitman and Hough were friends with each other and with Hiram W. Leffingwell and Richard Smith Elliott, who had initiated the movement to establish the city. When the schools were established, both schools educated only White students.

The district had intended to move the portable building from the Jefferson Elementary School to Meacham Park once the two new schools were established, but after a fire damaged the Washington school in 1914, the district moved the portable there instead. Five years later, the damaged Washington School was still the only permanent school building for Black children; their education in the district ended at eighth grade. Black children of color had to attend high school out of town, if they could get there and could pay tuition.

In 1918, several families from Meacham Park appealed to the state legislature for help with getting Black children into high school. No action was taken. The local League of Women Voters became involved in August 1919 and protested such "inadequate educational opportunity" for the African American children of the area. On February 19, 1920, the League and concerned citizens met with the school board about the issue, making the argument that everyone benefits when everyone is well-educated, but the board stated that no funds were available. By July 19 of that year, the board relented and set aside $400 to fund tuition for Black students to attend high school in the public schools that would accept them, which at that time were Charles H. Sumner High School in St. Louis City and Douglass High School in Webster Groves. By November of that year, the board had authorized $40 to pay tuition for four Black students to attend the St. Louis public schools for one quarter. Families still needed to cover transportation costs, although the district later included transportation in its appropriations. The nearest streetcar stop was at Woodbine and Clay Streets, a ways away from Meacham Park. Parents had to rely on the district paying on time.

By early 1921, voters agreed to build a new school for African American students, and African American parents met with the school board in April to discuss a site. While debates about the site and age-range went on for four years, architect Ittner presented plans for the new school in March 1922.

In 1921, a new high school was built on Kirkwood Road, near the location of what was to become Nipher Middle School. The school opened for classes in 1922.

Contracts for the work for the new Meacham Park School to educate Black children were awarded February 7, 1924. The school board also agreed to improve the Booker T. Washington School. The former would educate the district's Black children in grades 1 through 6 who lived south of the municipality's southern border, and the latter would educate the district's Black children in grades 1 through 6 who lived north of the municipality's southern border; all Black children in the district would attend seventh and eighth grades at the Meacham Park School–outside of city limits. Two rooms of the Meacham Park School opened in September 1924, and the remainder opened in the spring of 1925. First-year enrollment numbered 230 children. The school graduated its first eighth grade class in the spring of 1925. Black graduates of the district's two Black elementary schools attended high school in St. Louis City, approximately 20 miles distant.

In 1927, the district purchased five lots of land surrounding the Meacham Park school in anticipation of an expansion. In 1929, a bond issue was passed through which $250,000 was raised to expand and improve the Meacham Park school; expand Henry Hough School; and construct a new junior high school and two new elementary schools. Nipher Junior High School (which later became Nipher Middle School) was built in 1929 just to the south of the high school location on Kirkwood Road. Designed by Ittner, it was for the education of White seventh and eighth graders. The school was named for Dr. Francis Eugene Nipher, an educator and a professor at Washington University in St. Louis.

In September 1930, Keysor Elementary School opened on land that had been purchased by the district for $9,000; it was also designed by Ittner. The school served eighty White students in first through fourth grade. The school was named for William Winchester Keysor, a retired judge and professor who was president of the board of education. The judge's wife, Jennie Ellis Keysor, was a writer of children's books and a proponent of adult education.

Keysor's "sister" school, the George R. Robinson Elementary School, also opened in 1930. Located at the corner of Couch and Rose Hill, Robinson was also designed by Ittner. The school's namesake was a businessperson who had co-founded the Robinson Danforth Commission Company with William H. Danforth and William Andrews in the 1890s. The company produced feed for farm animals and changed its name to Ralston Purina in 1902.

By 1930, the district had the following schools: Katherine Tracy Kindergarten, Adams Avenue School, John Pitman School, Henry Hough School, Booker T. Washington School, George R. Robinson School, W.W. Keysor School, Meacham Park School, Nipher Junior High School, and Kirkwood High School.

To relieve overcrowding at the Washington school for Black students, all sixth-grade Black students were to attend the out-of-town Meacham Park School as of September 1931. Shortly thereafter, Black parents asked the board of education to rename the school the J. Milton Turner School, after a formerly enslaved person who had become a prominent politician. The school board approved the request in April 1932.

==== 1930s–1950: Expansion ====
The district expanded in 1931 when it annexed the nearby Meramec Highlands School District, which included the original one-room Osage Hills School in southwest Kirkwood. A new Osage Hills School would be built in 1938 at 1110 Glenwood South.

In 1933, in the midst of the Great Depression, the federal government announced that it had made grants available to fund school construction; consequently, the school district initiated an expansion to modernize by providing elementary schools closer to students' homes. It issued bonds to help fund construction and utilized the federal matching grant funds. The award of a federal grant to fund the building of three new schools, including a new building on the Turner School site, was announced in October 1937. The Public Works Administration was a grantor; the district also gained money by selling the Adams Street School to the local St. Peter Parish, which then razed it to make way for a high school for Roman Catholic students.

In 1938, Keysor expanded, and North Glendale Elementary School in the city of Glendale (but within the district) opened in the fall of that year to relieve overcrowding at Henry Hough School in the southern end of Glendale. A new Turner Junior High School in Meacham Park was completed in 1938; the original building was still attached and was used for the elementary grades.

In 1940, north and south wings were added to North Glendale Elementary School. In 1942, the old wooden portion of the Turner School was replaced with a brick structure for the elementary-aged children, and a cafeteria was added. In 1949, the district expanded again when it annexed the Meramec Highlands School District #51. Another wing was added to Keysor in 1949, and Westchester Elementary School was established in 1950.

==== 1950s: Racial integration ====
In 1950, the district closed the Booker T. Washington School, which left the Turner School in Meacham Park as the only school within district boundaries where the formal education of Black children occurred. The district stated that the state's Department of Education had recommended that the Washington School be closed and that keeping it open would lessen the district's reputation with the department. The closure occurred against the protests of the school's Black parents, who were concerned about their children being bussed far to a school outside of city limits. The school board did not act on these protests, and shortly thereafter, the Booker T. Washington School was razed.

In December 1950, the district's Black parents brought a suit against the district challenging the constitutionality of the racial segregation in education. As of 1954, Missouri was one of 17 states plus the District of Columbia with racial segregation requirements affecting its public school systems. On June 15 of that year, the U.S. Court of Appeals sided with the plaintiffs in the 1950 suit, citing the May 17, 1954 U.S. Supreme Court decision in the Brown v. Board of Education of Topeka case that outlawed dual education systems based on race. The U.S. Court of Appeals ordered Kirkwood's school system to be desegregated. Desegregation in Kirkwood would be occurring in the context of racial desegregation of school districts across the state, which were experiencing gradual progress.

In September 1954, the Kirkwood School District's elementary schools were racially integrated, with Keysor receiving a new gymnasium and eight additional classrooms that year. Racial integration occurred at the high school in September 1955; with the high school moving to a new 47-acre, multi-building, collegiate-style campus on West Essex Avenue that year.

The district reorganized; the reorganization included the 1958 establishment of the Rose Hill School and a new junior high school, North Kirkwood Junior High School, which was at that time for seventh, eighth, and ninth-graders. School catchment areas were set up based on "logical neighborhood boundaries regardless of color"; consequently, there was racial disproportionality in enrollment due to racial segregation in housing; Nipher's enrollment contained a Black population that was well above the district average of 12 percent and North Kirkwood Middle School's enrollment was mostly White. Schools at this point included: Hough Elementary School, Keysor Elementary School, North Glendale Elementary School, the Osage Hills School, Pitman Elementary School, Robinson Elementary School, Rose Hill Elementary School, the J. Milton Turner School, Nipher Junior High School, North Kirkwood Junior High School, and Kirkwood High School.

==== 1960s: Declining enrollment, racial rebalancing ====
In 1964, North Glendale's gym was rebuilt, a south addition was constructed, and the school office was moved.

In the late 1960s, district enrollment declined. Several schools were closed, including the Osage Hills School, whose students were transferred to Robinson. The building was used by the school board as its central office and site for board meetings; it was also used as a repository for books. The building was sold to the now-defunct St. Joseph's Hospital in the mid-1980s, which used it as a day care center until the late 1990s.

In 1968, to prevent disproportionate African American enrollment at the Rose Hill Elementary School, the district created a joint attendance zone between Rose Hill and the primarily white Robinson Elementary School to rebalance the racial proportions in enrollment. The district was unsuccessfully sued by opponents of the transfers.

In 1971, the district established a school offering an alternative to traditional primary education. The district also had a program for students in the eighth and ninth grades who were described as underachievers. Keysor's front driveway was built in 1973.

==== 1970s: Reorganization to racially desegregate ====
In August 1973, the Office for Civil Rights (OCR) under the federal Department of Education requested the Kirkwood School District explain the disproportionate representation of Black students at Turner. In its response, the district pointed out that it had a biracial interpersonal relations committee and promised to take action. In addition, the racial balance of students and teachers was near the OCR's threshold of acceptability in multiple schools, with enrollment trends predicting increased Black enrollment at those schools, and it was expected that enrollment patterns would invite legal challenges. On April 1, 1975, the OCR accepted a desegregation plan from the district.

The plan was designed to address racial imbalances, effect curriculum reform, and meet fiscal restraints. At the start of the 1975-76 school year, the all-Black J. Milton Turner school was closed "to an uproar of protest." Turner became a neighborhood center providing community services. The Pitman, Des Peres, and Osage Hills schools were also closed. Children were transferred so as to minimize racial isolation. For example, students who had been attending the Turner School were shifted to Robinson Elementary School. Keysor's front driveway was expanded to accommodate school bus traffic. The consequence of the shifts was an increase in Black enrollment at Keysor, Hough, and Tillman, but Robinson's enrollment was 29% Black students, and other schools ended up having minimal Black enrollment. Teachers were also shifted among schools.

During that reorganization, ninth grade ultimately moved from Nipher Junior High School to the High School, and Nipher became Nipher Middle School, where sixth through eighth graders were educated. Ninth graders also ultimately moved from North Kirkwood Junior High School to the high school, and like Nipher, the school became North Kirkwood Middle School. Innovative instructional techniques such as team teaching were implemented at the middle schools.

Before implementation, district leaders laid the foundation for public acceptance of the plan by distributing fact sheets and holding coffees and community forums. Doubts were widespread, particularly among parents whose children were affected by the closings, although more students received bus transportation to school than before, which was of benefit to families. The changes were difficult for some teachers and principals. The district hired a human relations specialist to work with teachers. The district's desegregation specialist set up liaison functions between the district and the community's Black leaders and fostered increased communication among Black families. The desegregation specialist increased the district's ability to problem-solve, and set up an ombudsman system to address families' concerns. Numerous trainings for teachers and other personnel were held, some of which focused on new teaching methods instead of desegregation. Teachers and administrators developed and distributed a manual to resolve classroom tensions. The district improved its communications with families. Overall, the integregation plan proceeded relatively smoothly with little overt conflict.

Also, the human relations specialist tested a suspension monitoring system to improve data on which future action plans could be based. For the 1976-77 school year, efforts took place at the high school to minimize suspensions so that discipline practices did not discriminate against Black children.

It was felt that the desegregation plan was numerically successful, although a 1977 analysis by the OCR stated, "Whether it will succeed as an educational proposition remains to be seen." The analysis stated that ongoing success would depend on support from the school board, teaching staff, and community.

"The administration must continue to encourage faculty and staff support for its reforms and to prevent inschool discrimination. The district is working hard to overcome or avoid such problems and ensure that Kirkwood schools are providing quality desegregated education of which the entire community can be proud."

==== 1980s–2000s: Facilities improvements ====
The Henry Hough School closed in 1982, and its students were absorbed into North Glendale Elementary School, which necessitated a 1988 expansion. In 1987, Keysor expanded with the addition of a science room and a library.

The Meacham Park community was annexed into Kirkwood city proper in 1991. The Kirkwood Early Childhood Center (KECC) opened the same year. The preschool is self-funded and non-profit, earning revenues from tuition, fund-raisers, and federal funding of early childhood special education.

Bonds were issued in 1993 that allowed for additional school renovations. At North Glendale, the renovations included upgrading infrastructure for technology and conditioning, improving compliance with the Americans with Disabilities Act, renovating the library, and upgrading bathrooms and corridors. North Kirkwood Middle School was expanded and renovated. A fine arts complex was built at the high school, along with a commons area that was funded by a donation from Earl and Myrtle Walker; the couple, 1930s graduates, founded the Carr Lane Manufacturing Company and benefited the district with their philanthropy.

In 1997, North Glendale Elementary School and the city of Glendale collaborated to improve the outside grounds and amenities for the use of both students and residents.

In 2005, Kirkwood voters approved Proposition I, a bond initiative which provided funds for improvements and infrastructure as well as inroads to complete the master facility plan. In 2005, North Kirkwood Middle School was expanded and renovated. Prop I improvements at North Glendale included a new roof, fire alarm system, exterior doors, and plumbing; tuckpointing; and a new ADA lift in the gym. A new science facility was built at the high school in 2005. The Kirkwood School District Foundation raised $1.6 million in private monies to support the expansion; the Walkers pledged half of the funding.

In 2010, Kirkwood city voters passed Proposition 1 to fund facilities improvements at its schools in support of the district's master facilities plan. A gym and classrooms were added onto Keysor, space was renovated, and there were safety improvements. North Kirkwood Middle School was expanded and renovated, as was North Glendale Elementary School.

==== 2010s–2020s ====
A series of sexual harassment allegations were levied against former administrators and teachers by former students, with the earliest allegations going back to the 1980s. As of January 2021, the case is being prosecuted by St.Charles County Prosecutors due to a conflict of interest in St. Louis County's Prosecutor's Office.

== Other programs ==
In 2009, the district established Vista, a separate setting in its own building with alternative programming for middle and high school students enrolled in the Kirkwood and Webster Groves school districts. Students learn their lessons via computer and work at their own pace; homework is optional. The program was established to help struggling students graduate on time. The program's students comprised 7% of Kirkwood High School's graduates in the 2010-11 school year.

== General information ==
Teachers are represented by a collective bargaining unit, the Kirkwood affiliate of the Missouri National Education Association. Approximately 130 of the district's faculty are members. Teachers are not unionized.

== Equity and governance ==
In 2014, Robinson partnered with KECC to open a preschool classroom to educate future Robinson students for their "important year before Kindergarten."

After witnessing the unrest that occurred in the wake of the death of Michael Brown in Ferguson, Missouri on August 9, 2014, Missouri Governor Jay Nixon established the 14-member Ferguson Commission on November 18, 2014 to examine and provide recommendations about conditions in the region that were impeding progress, equality, and safety. One of the Ferguson Commission Report's "Calls to Action" is to eliminate the options for out-of-school suspensions and expulsions as discipline practices for students in Kindergarten through third grade, because such removals from instruction impede long-term outcomes. During the school year starting in 2014, the proportion of suspensions meted out to Kirkwood's students of color was 3.7 times the proportion of enrollment that comprised students of color. In July 2017, concerned district parents described their children's experiences with suspensions to the board of education. The district put together a committee to examine the issue; the superintendent stated that personnel had received training about trauma-informed and restorative practices, and would be receiving anti-bias training. On August 20, 2018, the board of education approved a revised discipline policy which eliminated suspension and expulsion for elementary school students (in grades preschool through five) unless required by law; the policy also requires the use of restorative justice practices.

On September 24, 2018, the district's Board of Education adopted a Governance Plan. One of the Plan's goals is to ensure the Board of Education's compliance with a district policy that holds the Board responsible for establishing educational goals to guide the Board and staff in collaborating toward continued improvement of the district's educational programs. The Plan contains the district's priorities (as previously approved by the Board of Education), objectives, and forty-four SMART goals (specific, measurable, attainable, relevant, and time-bound.) The Plan is grounded in extensive stakeholder input and data. The Governance Plan's Governance Priorities are: Equity for All; Communication and Engagement; Resource Management; and Student and Employee Wellness, Growth & Success. Equity encompasses twelve of the Plan's forty-four SMART goals; the plan states that the Kirkwood School District is "committed to equity."

== Allegations of sexual abuse, permissive district culture ==
In July 2020, multiple allegations began to surface on social media of alleged sexual abuse of students by Kirkwood High School and other district personnel dating back to at least the 1990s. Allegations came from more than a dozen former Kirkwood High School students. It was also alleged that the Kirkwood School District failed to take appropriate measures to address the incidents and prevent recurrences. Criminal investigations into at least two alleged abusers were begun.

In August 2020, the district's board of education approved the hiring of the Kansas City (Missouri) firm Encompass Resolution, LLC to analyze and make recommendations about the district's climate and culture related to the reporting and handling of sexual abuse allegations and alleged employee misconduct. Survivors of the alleged abuse expressed concern that the firm's focus is on enacting solutions to address workplace disputes and not on improving school climate related to sexual abuse.

On September 9, 2020, a federal lawsuit was filed against the district and a former employee of the high school. The lawsuit alleges federal civil rights and Title IX violations and estimates that more than 25 district employees have been involved in sexual harassment, abuse, or discrimination against students over the previous 40 years. The suit also alleges that the former high school employee named as a defendant committed sexual assault and battery, although no criminal charges have been filed. The plaintiff's attorney states that the broad goal of the lawsuit is to prevent recurrences of sexually inappropriate behavior by district employees.

On September 28, 2020, a different former high school teacher was arrested on five counts of statutory rape and numerous counts of statutory sodomy. He was indicted on October 1. Court documents state the abuse allegedly occurred within the high school building. The teacher had been accused of abuse before. In 1998, the district had allowed him to resign after two high school students separately reported abuse to the school's principal, and the resignation agreement stipulated that no charges be filed, no internal hearing take place, and no board inquiries be pursued. In addition, during the summer of 2020, numerous students had reported to a news outlet their experiences of grooming and abuse by the former employee, with reports to school leaders being made and nothing being done. The case is being handled by the St. Charles County prosecutor's office because of a conflict of interest in the prosecutor's office of the district's county, St. Louis.

On July 16, 2021, a lawsuit was filed in St. Louis County which alleges that a different former Kirkwood High School teacher and coach sexually abused a student in the 1980s. The suit alleges that high school administrators failed to "do anything to investigate, reprimand, deter, remedy and/or punish [the employee's] conduct" and that staff started "openly gossiping, joking, and spreading rumors about Plaintiff" once they became aware of the abuse.

Representatives of Encompass Resolution, LLC presented their findings and recommendations to the district's board of education on June 28, 2021. Their report stated that their analysis found thirty staff members involved in substantiated allegations of sexual misconduct or abuse that extended over more than four decades. The auditors had received information about additional alleged perpetrators but without enough information to consider their specifics in their analysis.

The audit found numerous long-standing deficits in the district's culture and climate related to sexual abuse, misconduct, and reporting. These deficits had a significant impact on the affected students; the report stated, "Several affected parties spoke of avoiding teachers--and even dropping classes and avoiding specific subjects for the remainder of their high school years--because of their sexually charged experienced with teachers." The auditors made numerous recommendations. The report noted that the district has begun providing specialized training to those staff members who are responsible for conducting investigations.

== Schools ==
High schools:

- Kirkwood High School

Middle schools:

- Nipher Middle School
- North Kirkwood Middle School

Elementary schools:

- W.W. Keysor Elementary School
- North Glendale Elementary
- George R. Robinson Elementary School
- F.P. Tillman Elementary School
- Westchester Elementary

Preschool:

- Kirkwood Early Childhood Center
