= J. Dallas Bowser =

American poet

James Dallas Bowser
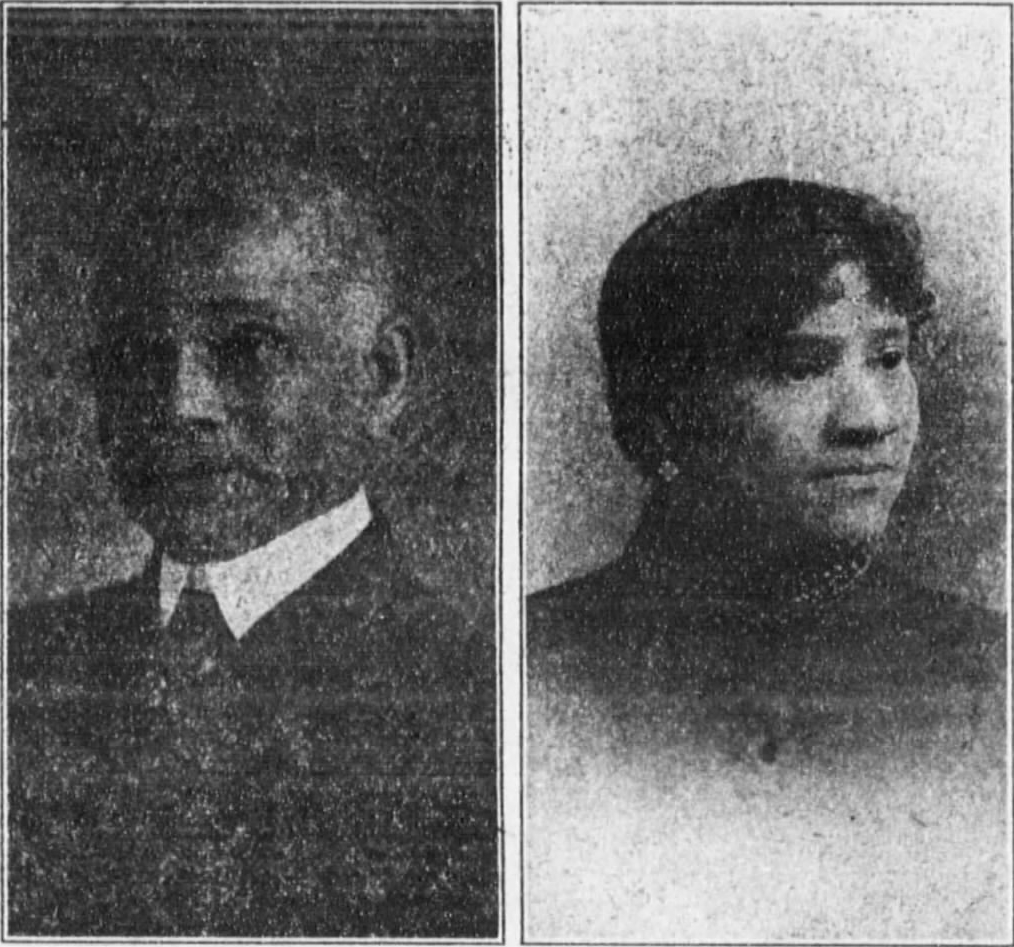
- James and Dora Bowser in 1919
- Born: February 15, 1846; Weldon, North Carolina
- Died: January, 1923 (aged 76); Kansas City, Missouri
- Occupations: Journalist, educator
- Political party: Republican

James Dallas Bowser (February 15, 1846-January 1923) was a journalist and educator in Kansas City, Missouri. He was the principal of Lincoln School there from 1868-1879 and later the principal of Attucks School. He was a civil rights leader in the city and was widely known for his poem, "Take up the Black Man's Burden", written in 1899 in response to British poet Rudyard Kipling's poem "The White Man's Burden". Bowser was a member of the Citizen's League of Kansas City Inter-Racial Committee.

== Early life ==
James Dallas Bowser was born free in Weldon, North Carolina on February 15, 1846 to free people of color. When he was about six years old, the family moved to Chillicothe, Ohio, which had a black community. His father, Henry Bowser, became one of the first black teachers there.

In the mid 1860s, Bowser moved to Kansas City where he also became a teacher. In 1868, James Milton Turner, principal of the Lincoln School, resigned when appointed as US Minister to Liberia. Bowser was hired to succeed him. He held that job for eleven years before moving outside the city to Wyandotte County, Kansas, where he took a position as principal of another school. In 1873 he married Dora J. Troy of Xenia, Ohio.

== Political activities and work ==
Bowser was active in Republican politics in Kansas for the rest of his life. In 1881 he was appointed as a mail carrier, a patronage position he held for four years, until Republican appointees were replaced by the new administration of Democratic President Grover Cleveland. Bowser was a member of the Republican State Central Committee in 1885 and 1886.

In 1887 he worked as a sealer of weights and measures in Kansas City. In the 1900s, he also worked as principal at Attucks School in Kansas City.

== Gate City Press ==
In 1880, H. H. Johnson founded The Free Press in Kansas City, but was only able to afford a single issue. Johnson solicited the aid of Bowser, and Bowser took control of the paper starting with its second issue. He renamed it as the Gate City Press and became its editor. The paper was very successful and attracted well-known writers. William Ward Yates (husband of Josephine Silone Yates) and G. N. Gresham were associate editors of the paper.

In 1886, Bowser hosted activist and journalist Ida B. Wells when she visited Kansas City for the National Teachers Association meeting. Shortly after, Bowser suggested that Wells apply for a teaching position in Kansas, saying that she could write for his newspaper. Wells decided to settle in Memphis. Bowser continued to publish the paper until 1889.

== Black Man's Burden ==
In 1899, Bowser published a poem in response to Rudyard Kipling's "The White Man's Burden". Bowser entitled his work "Take up the Black Man's Burden", a sample of which reads:

Take up the Black Man's burden
"Send forth the best ye breed,"
To judge with righteous judgement
The Black Man's work and need,
[...]
Let the glory of your people
Be the making of great men,
The lifting of the lowly,
To noble thought and aim.

He drew connections between racism and imperialism in the poem and criticized both. He also advocated black self-improvement, a position expressed as well by Booker T. Washington, president of the Tuskegee Institute. The poem is often paired with a number of poems written in response to Kipling, particularly with "Charity Begins at Home", published a few weeks earlier in the Colored American and pseudonymously written by "X-Ray". It was more biting in its criticism.

== Later life and death ==
Bowser continued to work on issues of civil rights for African Americans. In 1920, Bowser became a member of the Citizen's League of Kansas City Inter-Racial Committee, nominated by the NAACP and the Colored Civic League. The biracial committee included six black and six white members: Nat Spencer, L. A. Halbert, Walter Matscheck, O. J. Hill, R. M. Maxwell, B. M Stigall, Bowser, William Alphian, S. W. Bacote, R. T. Coles, John Love, and Frank Neal. The organization worked with the city to attempt to diffuse racial violence and improve housing conditions for blacks in the city.

In 1921, Bowser published poem, "O Darkest Tulsa", a lament for the Tulsa race massacre, which killed numerous blacks and left hundreds homeless after widespread fires. The poem was published on October 1, 1921 in the Kansas City Sun. That same year, Bowser attended the NAACP national convention in Detroit.

Later in his life, Bowser was president of the Old Settlers' Association of Kansas City. He wrote and told stories about the history of the city. Bowser was a member of the Presbyterian Church and a freemason. He died at his home in Kansas City in January 1923.

== Bibliography ==
- Coulter, Charles Edward. Take Up the Black Man's Burden: Kansas City's African American Communities, 1865-1939. University of Missouri Press, 2006.
