= Audrain County Courthouse =

- U.S. National Register of Historic Places
- Audrain County Courthouse, September 2026

- Location within Missouri Location within the United States
- Location: 101 N. Jefferson St., Mexico, Missouri
- Coordinates: 39°10′21″N 91°52′59″W
- Area: Less than 1 acre (0.40 ha)
- Built: 1951
- Built by: Epple Construction
- Architect: Bonsack & Pearce
- Architectural style: Neo-Classical Revival
- NRHP reference No.: 12000434
- Added to NRHP: July 25, 2012

Audrain County Courthouse, also known as Audrain County Memorial Courthouse, is a historic courthouse located in Mexico, Audrain County, Missouri. It was built in 1951, and is a three-story, cubic form, brick building with streamlined Classical Revival styling. The interior features a three-story rotunda that is lined with balconies and lit by a large art glass skylight. Located on the property are the contributing flagpole (1951), a miniature replica of the Statue of Liberty (1959), a memorial water fountain (c. 1920s), and the headstone of a prominent early citizen (pre-1959).

It was listed on the National Register of Historic Places in 2012.
