= Washington School (Monroe City, Missouri) =

- U.S. National Register of Historic Places
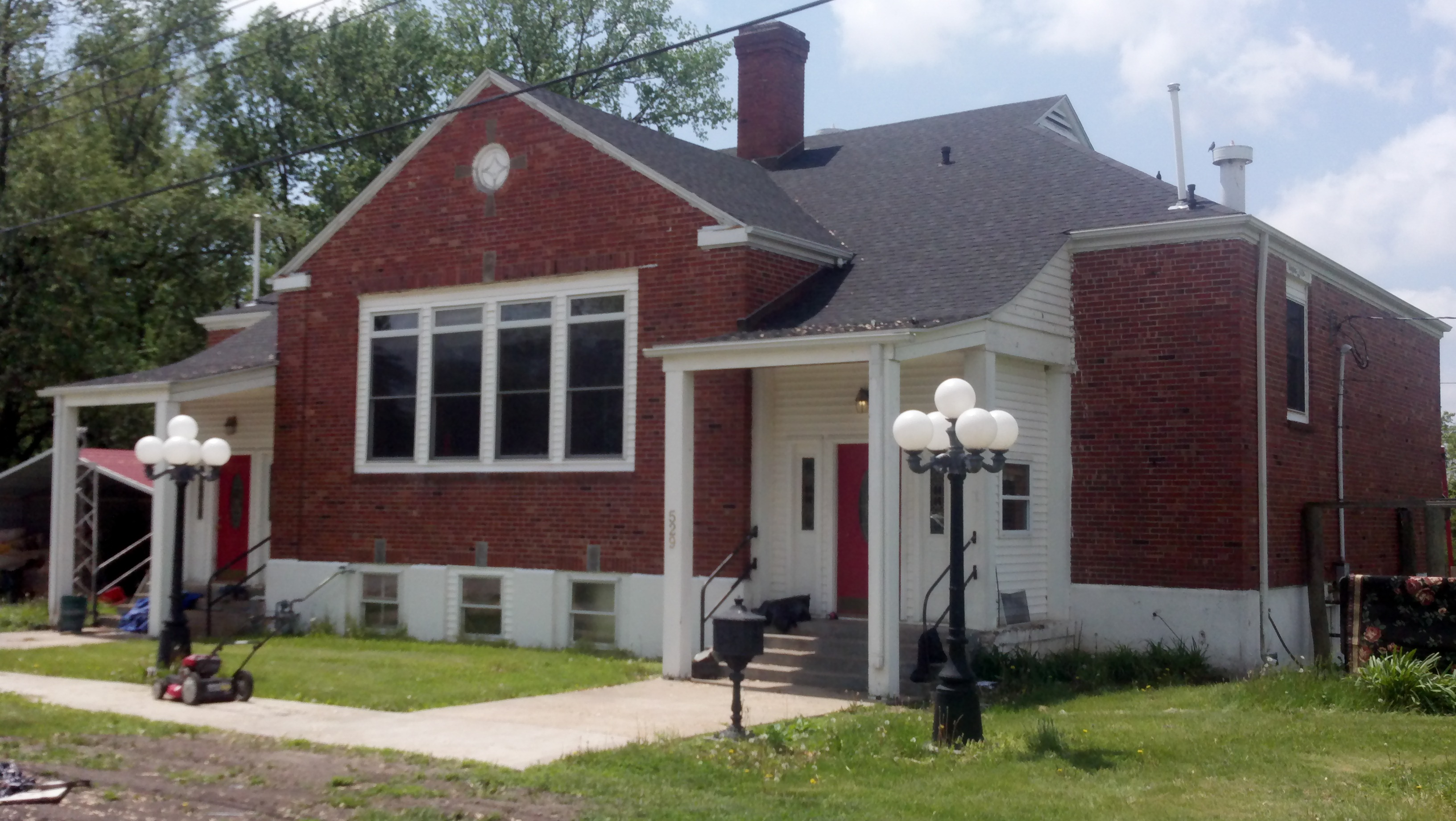
- Washington School, May 2014

- Location within Missouri Location within the United States
- Location: 529 S. Locust St., Monroe City, Missouri
- Coordinates: 39°38′17″N 91°44′12″W
- Area: 1 acre (0.40 ha)
- Built: 1937
- Built by: Epple Construction Co.
- Architect: Bonsack & Pearce
- Architectural style: Colonial Revival
- NRHP reference No.: 94001502
- Added to NRHP: December 29, 1994

Washington School, also known as the Head Start Building, is a historic school building located at Monroe City, Monroe County, Missouri, USA. It was built in 1937 and is a one-story, T-shaped, Colonial Revival style brick building. It housed three classrooms for the education of the African-American students of Monroe City. It was listed on the National Register of Historic Places in 1994.

Also on the property are the contributing the flagpole which was erected at the same time as the building, and a merry-go-round from the same period.
