= 1870 Missouri State Colored People's Educational Convention =

Held in Jefferson City from January 19 to 22 in the city's resident Baptist church

The Missouri State Colored People's Educational Convention was held in Jefferson City from January 19 to 22 in the city's resident Baptist church. This convention was brought on by the work of Colonel F. A. Seely and J. Milton Turner, as they had both researched the conditions of public schools for black children in Missouri during the preceding two years. The President of this convention; J. Milton Turner, established the convention out of the sheer lack of public schools and normal schools for blacks. They additionally met to address the deliberate lack of support from local school boards for black public and normal schools. Over the course of the convention, committees were called upon to present the convention's case for equal education to the people of color of Missouri and to state officials. The majority of their points touched on how state funds for schools were used. In the final days, the convention proposed a bill that would be recommended to the Missouri legislature; this bill outlined the need and plan for a state normal school to train teachers of color. This bill guaranteed funds for the school and required the trustees of the school to certify that suitable grounds and resources would be provided for the school under the supervision of the state board of education. The women who had catered the meetings and a women's choir who had performed after a prayer were thanked for their part in the convention. These acts were the only kind of political participation these women could engage in, as women were not allowed to vote or participate in the convention.

== Systemic corruption in Missouri schools ==
From 1868 to 1869, Colonel F. A. Seely and J. Milton Turner were asked by the American Missionary Association (AMA), an organization that had played an important role in improving the education for blacks in the US after the Civil War, to investigate the conditions of schools all over the state. The AMA partnered with the Missouri field office of the Bureau of Refugees, Freedmen, and Abandoned Lands, who had been the employers of both F. A. Seely and J. Milton Turner. From their investigation, they found that the lack of schools for black children in many towns was attributed to the often inaccurate count of black children. The state law mandated that a town needed to have 15 children to start a school, and in several towns, the school board would report an inaccurate number. In other cases, school board members would take funds allocated for black schools. There were also cases of black schools being held in churches. In addition to the lack of normal schools for black teachers, some school boards also refused to hire black teachers.

== Schools and the state ==
During this convention, a larger argument took place in the Missouri legislature about the role of the state in education. Missouri State Senator Spaunhorst and other lawmakers argued that education was the responsibility of parents alone and that the responsibility of the state was only to fund that education. This argument came about after the Missouri State House was faced with a bill proposing that the state would be tasked with deciding a curriculum for every Missouri school to follow. This bill would decide how involved the state would be in the establishment of schools and the development of students. Not only would this bill begin to provide black and white students with a similar education, it would also allow for federal legislation to be passed regarding all U.S. schools. Over time, however, this bill would come in direct conflict with the Plessy v Ferguson decision in 1896 that would further distance the quality of education between black and white students.

== See also ==
- Colored Conventions Movement
- J. Milton Turner
- Plessy v Ferguson
