= Erythrophleum ivorense =

Conservation status
- Least Concern (IUCN 3.1)

Scientific classification
- Kingdom: Plantae
- Clade: Tracheophytes
- Clade: Angiosperms
- Clade: Eudicots
- Clade: Rosids
- Order: Fabales
- Family: Fabaceae
- Subfamily: Caesalpinioideae
- Genus: Erythrophleum
- Species: E. ivorense

Binomial name
- Erythrophleum ivorense A.Chev.

Synonyms
- Erythrophleum micranthum Holland

Species of legume

Erythrophleum ivorense is a species of leguminous tree in the genus Erythrophleum found in the rainforests of tropical West and Central Africa. The tree has many uses; the timber is used for heavy construction, for making charcoal and for firewood, the bark is used for tanning and in traditional medicine, and both bark and seeds are poisonous and used for hunting.

== Description ==
Erythrophleum ivorense is a tall evergreen tree that can grow to a height of 40 m (130 ft). The trunk is cylindrical and up to 150 cm (60 in) in diameter; it may be fluted near the base and may have buttresses. The bark is grey, scaly and fissured, and the inner bark is granular and reddish. The young twigs are downy and the alternate, bi-pinnate leaves each have up to seven pairs of alternately arranged ovate leaflets and a terminal leaflet. The inflorescence is a terminal or auxiliary raceme, about 8 cm (3 in) long, covered with reddish-brown down. The flowers are reddish-brown and hairy, with parts in fives, and are followed by flat, leathery, dangling seed pods, each containing up to six seeds.

== Distribution and habitat ==
Erythrophleum ivorenseis native to tropical West Africa where its range extends from The Gambia to Gabon and the Central African Republic. It occurs in evergreen and moist, semi-deciduous forest, primarily in mature second-growth forest. The roots often bear nodules containing Bradyrhizobium, bacteria which are capable of nitrogen fixation.

== Uses ==
The timber is very durable and is traded internationally. It is used for heavy construction, bridges, wharves and railway sleepers, as well as for boat building and wheel hubs. However the sawdust is irritating to the mucosa and may causes asthma and allergies to workers in sawmills. The wood makes good charcoal and firewood. The bark is used in tanning and has several uses in traditional medicine. Both the bark and the seeds are toxic and are used in hunting, and in Sierra Leone, the bark is used to poison fish.
