= Song of Count Timo =

9th-century Latin poem

The Song of Count Timo (Latin: Carmen de Timone comite) is an anonymous Latin poem of 150 lines composed in 834 in the diocese of Freising. It is addressed to King Louis the German and ostensibly celebrates his count of the palace, Timo, for his justice while offering a strong critique of the ordeal and trial by combat.

== Date, place and authorship ==
The author was a cleric. He wrote in the diocese of Freising, either in the city of Freising itself or in the nearby monastery of Weihenstephan. The author may have had a connection to the city of Lyon, where Archbishop Agobard was a known critic of the ordeal. Agobard's predecessor was the Bavarian Leidrad.

The poet probably composed the Song on the occasion of a visit from King Louis to Freising and Weihenstephan in 834. It is the only known poem addressed to Louis by one of his subjects. Eric Goldberg situates the poem and the events it recounts in the context of an empire-wide restoration of justice following the rebellions of 833–834. This programme, announced by Emperor Louis the Pious in November 834, was aimed at the suppression of banditry and the reversal of land usurpations (especially at the expense of the church). Louis the German was closely allied to his father, Louis the Pious, during this period. If this is the context, then the poem must be later than November 834.

== Synopsis ==
The first four lines of the poem are lost. It begins with praise of Timo for "restor[ing] the neglected work of law" in Noricum, the ancient Roman name for the region. The king is then compared directly to Moses, Job and David, biblical figures associated with justice. Of the royal interest the poet writes:

...the royal concern is to thwart criminal things,
and to lift the heavy yoke from the necks of the innocent.
Indeed, the entire royal duty is to secure the peace,
and to guide the kingdom's separate dominions with his hand.

On the hill of Weihenstephan, Timo holds court. He hangs thieves, brands robbers and sentences other criminals to maiming, that is, the loss of a foot, hand or nose. Lines 69–82 suddenly turn to criticism of the ordeal and trial by combat. These are denounced as blasphemous, for they render reason and wisdom, and thus the Bible also, irrelevant. The Last Judgement becomes pointless, since everything could ostensibly be revealed and punished in this life. Specifically alluded to are the ordeals of hot iron and boiling water.

The poem mentions how Bishop Hitto of Freising went to Rome to acquire relics for Weihenstephan. It ends with a lengthy story about the miraculous healing spring on Weihenstephan, supposedly called forth by Saint Corbinian, Freising's first bishop. The spring dried up because people let their dogs drink from it, but it was restored through a ceremony involving Corbinian's staff. During one of his courts, however, Timo let his dog drink from it and the dog died. The poem ends with the lines (148–150):

From that on which man thrives, the dog died.
Tell, dog, who persuaded you to lap from the cup of life,
who persuaded you to honor the holy waters with filth?

== Interpretation ==
The poem moves from praise of the king as the source of justice, to praise of his representative, to critique of Timo's methods and finally to the consequences for Timo of disrespecting what is holy. According to Warren Brown, the poem is "an unmistakable warning: the representatives of the secular authority should respect the sanctity of the holy or suffer the consequences."

The ceremony to restore the spring was probably a recent event. Since the poet does not mention Bishop Hitto's presence, it probably took place during his journey to Rome, which is also when the poem was probably written.

Two supernatural occurrences in the poem—the drying up of the spring and the death of Timo's dog—result from dogs drinking from a spring. Amos Bronner suggests that this is not the mere motif of dogs defiling the holy but that there was a live dispute over whether the spring used for healing the sick could also be used to water dogs. The death of Timo's dog demonstrates the competing authority of the church, whose clergy restored the spring.

The harsh corporal punishments the poet attributes to Timo's court are uncommon in the sources but probably reflect the harsh reality of justice for the poorest and unfree.

Jakob Bummer accused the poet of combining an "enlightened" attitude to the ordeal with a "naïve" stance towards miracles. He proposed that the poet's attitude towards the ordeal was borrowed from another authority, such as Agobard. A more serious criticism of the poet is that his condemnation of the ordeal is inconsistent with his apparent appeal to divine justice to explain the death of Timo's dog. Bronner explores several solutions to this puzzle, including that the poet was opposed to Timo surrendering his authority to the community or to the elements of water and fire (as the ordeal required).

== Identity of Timo ==
Timo was a real person, a member of the Huosi, an old aristocratic family. He would have been easily identified by the poem's original audience. He is attested as the count of the palace, the chief judicial official, in Bavaria between 830 and 837. In 830 or 831, he and Count Liutpald witnessed a donation by the priest Sigifuns at Puppling. In 837, at Regensburg, with Counts Ernest and Werner, he witnessed a donation of the Prefect Radbod. A certain Fritilo who signed the donation of 837 is probably the person who succeeded Timo as a count of the palace by 843. He was probably his son. Other persons named Timo, active in the same area, are recorded in the 750s and 870s and are probably relatives of Count Timo. The family is associated with Thulbach.

The count of the palace is probably the same Timo who appears among other courtiers of Louis the German in the confraternity book of Reichenau.

== Manuscripts ==
The Song survives in a single manuscript of the 11th century, where the first four lines are incomplete. A note by the scribe claims that, "The beginning of these verses was not lost through negligence or laziness but rather obscured by old age in the scroll composed in ancient times, from which they are here transcribed."

== Works cited ==
- Bachrach, David S. (2019). "Royal Justice and the Comital Office in East Francia, c. 814–c. 899". Francia. 46: 1–23. doi:10.11588/fr.2019.0.83902.
- Bronner, Amos (2024). "The Judgement of God and the Fate of a Dog: The Ninth-century Ordeal Debate and the Anonymous Song of Count Timo". Journal of Medieval History. 50 (1): 1–19. doi:10.1080/03044181.2023.2291019.
- Brown, Warren (2002). Unjust Seizure: Conflict, Interest, and Authority in an Early Medieval Society. Cornell University Press.
- Glansdorff, Sophie (2011). Comites in regno Hludouici regis constituti: Prosopographie des détenteurs d’offices séculiers en Francie orientale, de Louis le Germanique à Charles le Gros, 826–887 (PDF). Thorbecke.
- Goldberg, Eric J. (2006). Struggle for Empire: Kingship and Conflict under Louis the German, 817–876. Cornell University Press.
- Hammer, Carl I. (2018). Huosiland: A Small Country in Carolingian Europe. Archaeopress.
