= Erythrophleum succirubrum =

Scientific classification
- Kingdom: Plantae
- Clade: Tracheophytes
- Clade: Angiosperms
- Clade: Eudicots
- Clade: Rosids
- Order: Fabales
- Family: Fabaceae
- Subfamily: Caesalpinioideae
- Genus: Erythrophleum
- Species: E. succirubrum

Binomial name
- Erythrophleum succirubrum Gagnep.

Species of plant

Erythrophleum succirubrum is a species of leguminous tree in the genus Erythrophleum. Endemic to Thailand, the seeds of the plant are poisonous if ingested.
