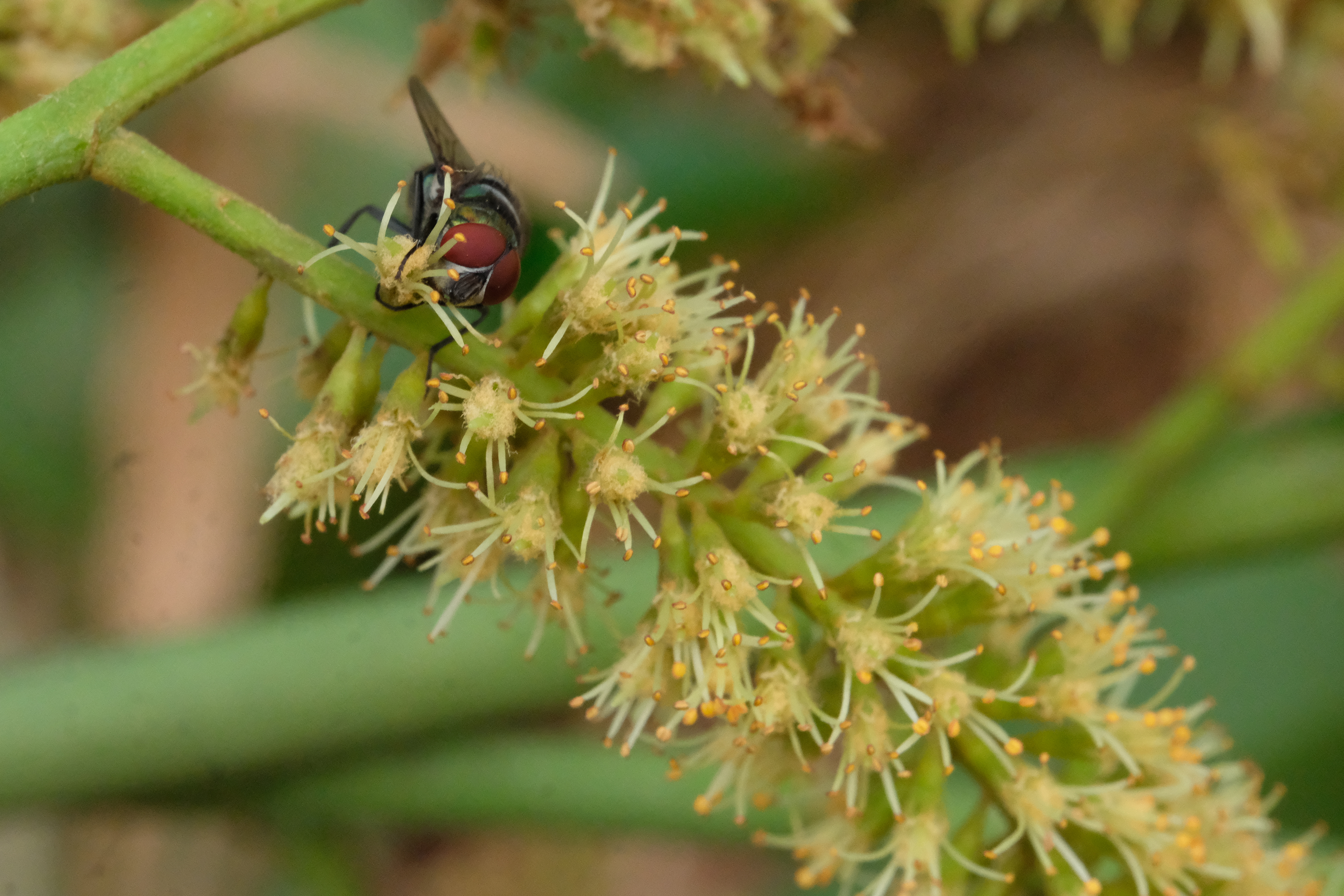
- Inflorescence of Erythrophleum suaveolens in Cameroon

Conservation status
- Least Concern (IUCN 3.1)

Scientific classification
- Kingdom: Plantae
- Clade: Tracheophytes
- Clade: Angiosperms
- Clade: Eudicots
- Clade: Rosids
- Order: Fabales
- Family: Fabaceae
- Subfamily: Caesalpinioideae
- Genus: Erythrophleum
- Species: E. suaveolens

Binomial name
- Erythrophleum suaveolens (Guill. & Perr.) Brenan

Synonyms
- List: Erythrophleum guineense G.Don; Erythrophleum judiciale Proctor; Erythrophleum ordale Bolle; Fillaea suaveolens Guill. & Perr.; Mavia judicia Walp.; Mavia judicialis G.Bertol.

= Erythrophleum suaveolens =

Species of legume

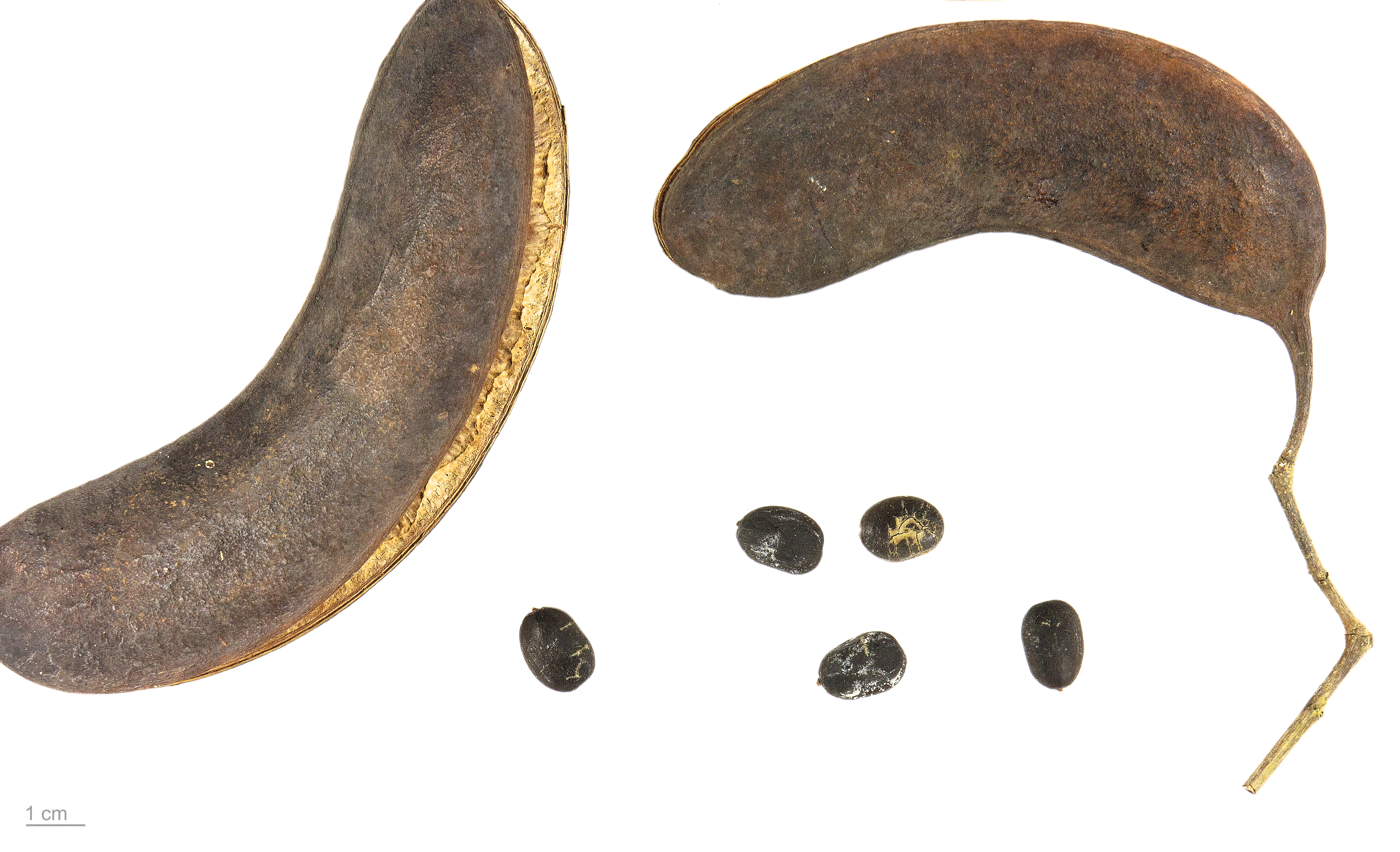
Erythrophleum suaveolens MHNT

Erythrophleum suaveolens, also known as the ordeal tree, is a species of flowering plant that can be found across most of tropical Africa. The species are up to 20 metres (70 ft) in height, and have a rough and blackish bark. The plants leaves have 2–3 pairs of pinnae, which carry 7–13 leaflets. The leaflets are 5 by 2.5 centimetres (2 in × 1 in), are green coloured and ovate. The flowers have fluffy spikes, and are creamy-yellow coloured. Fruits are hard, the pod of which is flat.

The bark of the tree has been used in Liberia to make a toxic concoction used for a form of trial by ordeal called "sassywood". This use has given it the common name of the "Ordeal Tree".
