= Sassywood =

Sassywood is an ancient West African form of trial by ordeal. Although it has been outlawed due to human rights concerns, it remains in sporadic use in Liberia. In sassywood, the necessary ordeal can take on many different forms. The principal one involves the drinking of a poisonous concoction made from the bark of the "Ordeal Tree", or erythrophleum suaveolens. Another involves the rubbing of a red-hot machete on the legs of the suspect, while a third involves dipping the suspect's hand into hot oil.

== The Ordeal Tree ==
The practice of sassywood, and specifically the use of erythrophleum suaveolens' poisonous bark, has a long history in Liberia. A Reverend Mr. Connelly described it in some detail in "My Report of the Kroo people" in the 1850 book The ... Annual Report of the American Colonization Society ...:

The bark of the sassy-wood is powerfully narcotic, and a strong decoction of this the person is forced to drink ... he either throws off from his stomach the poison, when he is pronounced innocent, or it operates as a cathartic, when he is declared guilty, and compelled to take more of the decoction, and is subjected to other cruelties, which cause his speedy death. ... The ordeal of sassy-wood is therefore made a penalty for all crimes ... the friends of the accused may buy him off from death for different sums of money ...

The bark of erythrophleum suaveolens contains the highly toxic compound erythrophleine. Ingestion of erythrophleine can quickly lead to ataxia, dyspnea, heart paralysis, and sudden death. Visible effects of erythrophleine poisoning include induced terror, labored and irregular breathing, convulsions, urination, and vomiting. While erythrophleine is extremely toxic, it is theorized that the tannins in the bark of the ordeal tree also contributed to making it ideal for use in trials by ordeal. Tannins can irritate the body's stomach lining, inducing vomiting before the erythrophleine can be absorbed, thus keeping the death rate of ingesting erythrophleum suaveolens bark low enough that the result of each trial is uncertain.

== Usage in Liberia and Sierra Leone ==
In October 2009, Assistant Internal Affairs Minister Jangar announced the Liberian government had banned the practice, after the deaths of seven people accused of witchcraft in River Gee County in June, at least two of whom died from drinking the poison, but enforcing this policy is difficult. The Liberian judicial system is in a "decrepit state", and a 2007 United Nations Security Council report described it as handicapped by "limited infrastructure, shortage of qualified personnel, lack of capacity to process cases, poor management and lack of the necessary will to institute reforms." There are few working courts in rural areas, and most people have no access to legal counsel, nor do many even know that sassywood is against the law. In stark contrast, sassywood is a quick and easy remedy which can take "less than 30 minutes". Some economists have even suggested that the maintenance of the sassywood trials in lieu of national judicial systems can have a positive effect on local Liberian communities. They argue that, due to their quickness, trials by ordeal are generally more responsive to local crimes, which better disincentivizes criminal activity than the "decrepit" Liberian judicial system. However, the randomness of the trial outcome and the power placed in the priests who brew this concoction make this argument highly contested.

A poison drink ordeal of the same name has also been reported in neighboring Sierra Leone.
