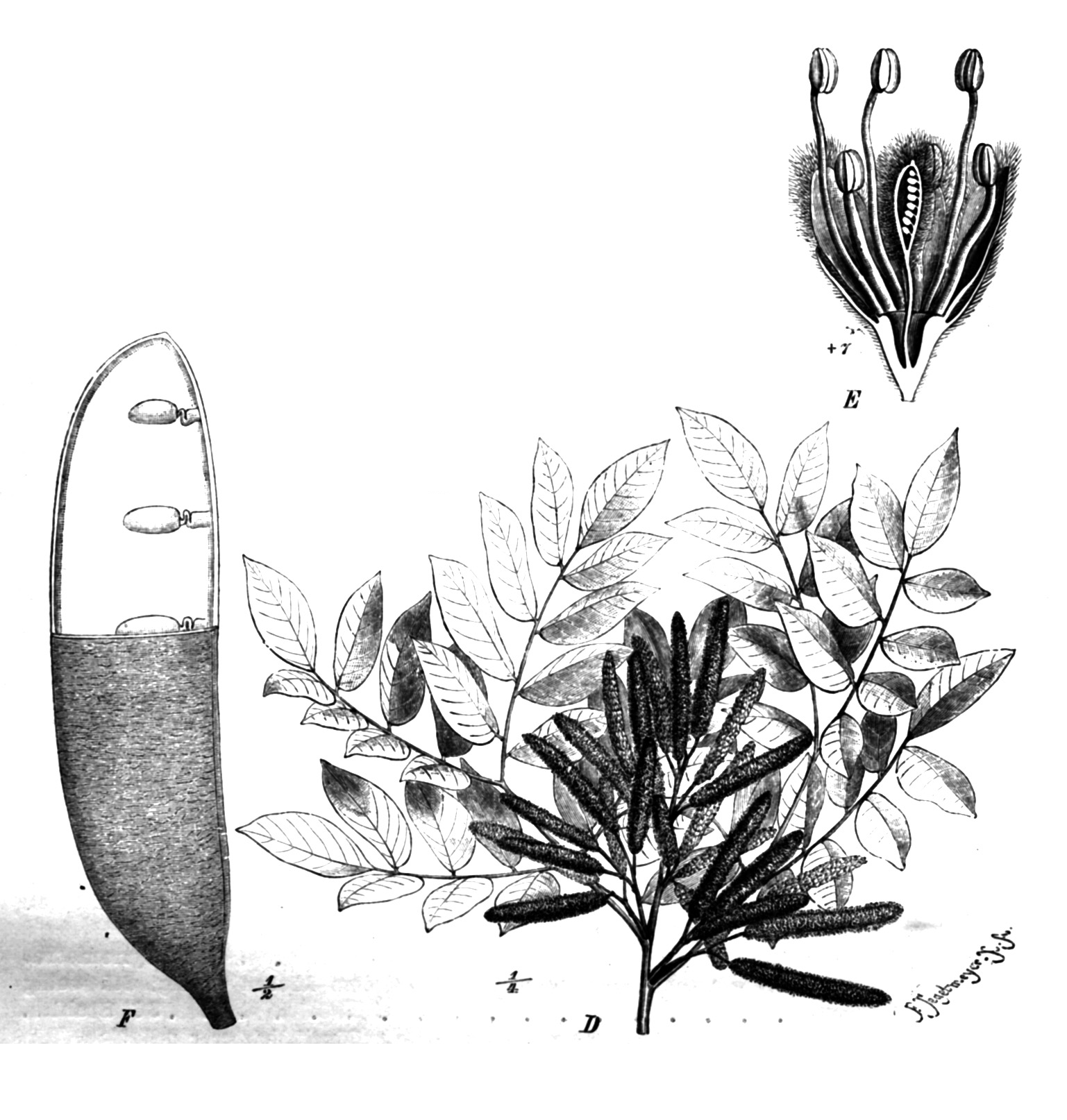
- Erythrophleum suaveolens
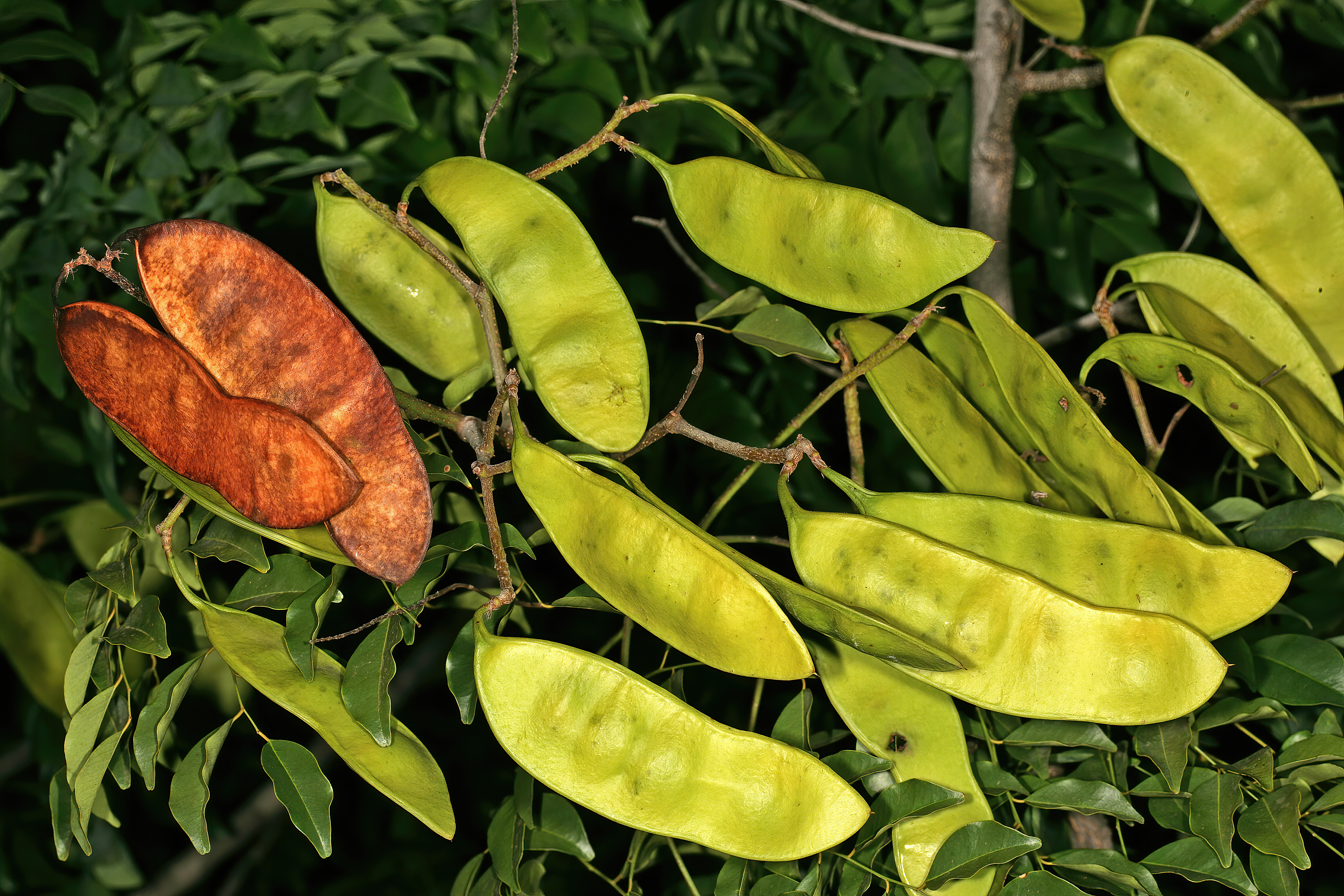
- Erythrophleum lasianthum

Scientific classification
- Kingdom: Plantae
- Clade: Tracheophytes
- Clade: Angiosperms
- Clade: Eudicots
- Clade: Rosids
- Order: Fabales
- Family: Fabaceae
- Subfamily: Caesalpinioideae
- Genus: Erythrophleum; R.Br. (1826)

Synonyms
- Fillaea Guill. & Perr. (1832); Laboucheria F.Muell. (1859); Mavia G.Bertol. (1850)

= Erythrophleum =

Genus of legumes

Erythrophleum is a genus of legume in the family Fabaceae. It includes ten species native to sub-Saharan Africa, Indochina, southern China, and northern Australia.

== Species ==
Plants of the World Online includes:

- Erythrophleum africanum (Benth.) Harms
- Erythrophleum arenarium R.L.Barrett & M.D.Barrett
- Erythrophleum chlorostachys (F.Muell.) Baill.
- Erythrophleum couminga Baill.
- Erythrophleum fordii Oliv.
- Erythrophleum ivorense A.Chev.
- Erythrophleum lasianthum Corbishley
- Erythrophleum letestui A.Chev.
- Erythrophleum pubescens R.L.Barrett & M.D.Barrett
- Erythrophleum suaveolens (Guill. & Perr.) Brenan
- Erythrophleum succirubrum Gagnep.
- Erythrophleum teysmannii (Kurz) Craib
