= Meacham Park, Kirkwood =

Neighborhood in Kirkwood, Missouri, United States

Meacham Park
- Interactive map of Meacham Park
- Coordinates: 38°33′52.4″N 90°23′59.1″W
- Country: United States
- State: Missouri
- County: St. Louis
- Time zone: UTC-6 (Central (CST))
  - Summer (DST): UTC-5 (CDT)

Meacham Park is a neighborhood of Kirkwood, Missouri, a city in St. Louis County, Missouri. It was established in 1892 by Elzey E. Meacham as an unincorporated community largely of African Americans and was eventually annexed by the city of Kirkwood, which relocated many of its residents to make way for a mall and other commercial property. Kirkwood previously annexed another strip and, along with the construction of a highway, physically divided the communities. Years of discrimination and neglect followed with Meacham used for public housing projects but not receiving the public services of its neighboring city. After it was annexed and hundreds of residents relocated or departed, tensions continued as its school was closed, requests for a community center at the closed school denied, and contracts made for city business with firms outside Meacham.

During segregation Meacham Park stood apart with its own institutions.

On February 7, 2008, Charles L. "Cookie" Thornton, a construction business owner and lifelong resident of Meacham Park, murdered five people during a Kirkwood city council meeting.

The former J. Milton Turner School building in Meacham Park is listed on the National Register of Historic Places. Also, the neighborhood's First Baptist Church, established in 1907 and originally built next to the J. Milton Turner School, was one of the first buildings in the St. Louis area that was owned by African Americans.

The area includes the 1.25 acre Meacham Memorial Park.
