= National Register of Historic Places listings in Adair County, Missouri =

Location of Adair County in Missouri

This is a list of the National Register of Historic Places listings in Adair County, Missouri.

This is intended to be a complete list of the properties and districts on the National Register of Historic Places in Adair County, Missouri, United States. Latitude and longitude coordinates are provided for many National Register properties and districts; these locations may be seen together in a map.

There are 21 properties and districts listed on the National Register in the county.

This National Park Service list is complete through NPS recent listings posted October 16, 2026.

== Current listings ==
	Name on the Register	Image	Date listed	Location	City or town	Description
1	Adair County Courthouse	Adair County Courthouse	August 11, 1978 (#78001636)	Washington St. 40°11′42″N 92°35′01″W	Kirksville	
2	Bear Creek Baptist Church	Bear Creek Baptist Church	March 29, 1984 (#84002132)	N of Kirksville off US 63; 40°14′30″N 92°37′31″W	Kirksville	
3	Cabins Historic District	Cabins Historic District	July 17, 1979 (#79001344)	S of Novinger off MO 6; 40°12′31″N 92°41′10″W	Novinger	
4	Dockery Hotel		February 10, 1983 (#83000971)	Elson and McPherson Sts. 40°11′38″N 92°35′04″W	Kirksville	Demolished in 1991.
5	First Presbyterian Church	First Presbyterian Church	July 10, 2017 (#100001298)	201 S. High St. 40°11′38″N 92°34′51″W	Kirksville	
6	Grim Building	Grim Building	June 27, 1979 (#79001343)	113-115 E. Washington St. 40°11′43″N 92°34′52″W	Kirksville	
7	Capt. Thomas C. Harris House	Capt. Thomas C. Harris House	October 15, 1973 (#73001034)	1308 N. Franklin St. 40°12′19″N 92°34′56″W	Kirksville	
8	Journal Printing Company Building	Journal Printing Company Building	July 14, 2011 (#11000439)	119 S. Elson St. 40°11′40″N 92°35′03″W	Kirksville	
9	Kirksville Courthouse Square Historic District	Kirksville Courthouse Square Historic District	May 21, 2009 (#09000330)	200 block N. Franklin St., 100 block E. Harrison St., 100 block W. Harrison St. 40°11′44″N 92°34′59″W	Kirksville	
10	Drs. George and Blanche Laughlin House	Drs. George and Blanche Laughlin House	March 11, 2014 (#14000047)	706 S. Halliburton St. 40°11′22″N 92°34′37″W	Kirksville	
11	Lincoln School	Lincoln School	January 31, 2017 (#100000606)	907 S. Wabash St. 40°11′17″N 92°35′17″W	Kirksville	
12	Masonic Temple	Masonic Temple	January 7, 2010 (#09001208)	217 E. Harrison St. 40°11′44″N 92°34′55″W	Kirksville	Egyptian Revival architecture
13	The Princess Theatre		January 29, 2026 (#100012647)	202 S. Franklin Street; 40°11′37″N 92°35′00″W	Kirksville	
14	St. Mary's Church	St. Mary's Church	December 16, 1974 (#74001069)	On MO 11; 40°15′08″N 92°22′27″W	Adair	Romanesque Revival architecture.
15	Salisbury School		October 23, 2017 (#100001757)	Missouri Route K 40°08′48″N 92°41′50″W	Kirksville	
16	Dr. E. Sanborn Smith House	Dr. E. Sanborn Smith House	January 30, 2009 (#08001385)	111 E. Patterson St. 40°11′11″N 92°34′59″W	Kirksville	
17	Orie J. Smith Black and White Stock Farm Historic District	Orie J. Smith Black and White Stock Farm Historic District	January 16, 2001 (#00001658)	0.5 miles SE of Jct. of MO P and Co. Rd. 129B; 40°13′32″N 92°33′33″W	Kirksville	
18	Sojourners Club	Sojourners Club	March 11, 2014 (#14000048)	211 S. Elson St. 40°11′36″N 92°35′03″W	Kirksville	
19	Thousand Hills State Park Petroglyphs Archeological Site	Thousand Hills State Park Petroglyphs Archeological Site	January 23, 1970 (#70000320)	W of Kirksville; 40°11′12″N 92°38′28″W	Kirksville	Within Thousand Hills State Park
20	Travelers Hotel	Travelers Hotel	September 16, 2009 (#09000718)	301 W. Washington St. 40°11′41″N 92°35′07″W	Kirksville	
21	Trinity Episcopal Church	Trinity Episcopal Church	January 2, 2008 (#07001338)	124 N Mulanix St. 40°11′50″N 92°34′47″W	Kirksville	

== See also ==
- List of National Historic Landmarks in Missouri
- National Register of Historic Places listings in Missouri
