= Adair, Missouri =

Unincorporated community in Missouri, U.S.

Coordinates: 40°15′08″N 92°22′27″W

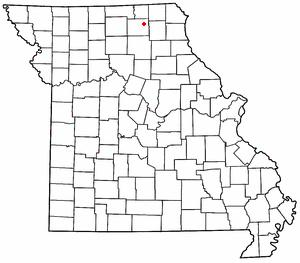
Adair's location in Adair County indicated by red dot

Adair, Missouri is an unincorporated community in eastern Adair County, Missouri, United States. It is located approximately 12 miles northeast of Kirksville, on Missouri Route 11. Adair is notable as the location of St. Mary's Church, which is on the National Register of Historic Places.

== History ==
The first settlers in Adair County, Missouri arrived in 1828 but it was only in the 1830s that they began to branch out to other areas of the county from their original settlement along the Chariton River. By the early 1840s new residents, primarily Irish Catholics by way of Ohio, began to arrive in northeastern Adair County. Their number increased as the Great Famine worsened, causing more Irish to leave their native land for America. By 1860 the populace was enough to support a rough-hewn log church and assignment of a priest. Following the end of the Civil War an attorney from Adair, a Mr. Clancy, wrote glowing editorials to newspapers back in Ohio praising the fine farmland and urging more Irish migration. Among the early settlers was Michael C. Cody, who had previously been involved in the steamboat trade. He arrived in Adair in 1855 and in the late 1860s donated a large tract of land for the village cemetery. Although Adair had yet to be incorporated or even platted, the populace was such that in January, 1878 a United States Post Office was established.

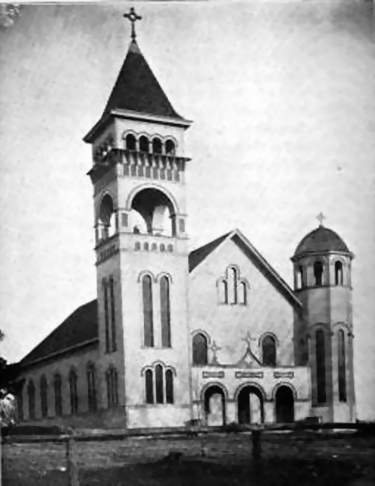
St. Mary's Catholic Church circa 1910

Finally in April, 1879 the village of Adair was platted by Mr. Thomas Dockery at the behest of Mr. Cody and his wife Mary. It was named after its county. By the 1880s Adair's list of business and manufacturing enterprises included a druggist/physician, saw mill, flour mill, hotel, millinery, shoe maker, wagon maker, hoop factory, general store, a livery, and stock dealer. Adair continued to see growth through the remainder of the late 19th and early 20th century, with a population estimated at over 400 by 1905 when the new St. Mary's Catholic Church was completed. One blemish, inexplicable considering the village's growth, was the closing of the Adair Post Office on October 31, 1905. The years after World War I and the Great Depression witnessed large migrations from rural farming to urban industrial areas across America—especially among young adults—and this caused a rapid decline in Adair's population and business offerings. Additionally, much-improved roads meant easier travel to area towns and cities like Baring and Kirksville for supplies. The possibility of an oil boom caused some excitement around Adair, and the region as a whole, in the 1940s. Oil wildcatters drilled a test well near Adair and oil was struck. However it was determined to not be of sufficient quality or quantity to interest major oil companies in further development.

By the 1970s, little remained of Adair. All the businesses had long since closed and perhaps a dozen occupied homes remained. St. Mary's Catholic Church long the backbone of the community, held its final mass in December 1972. A non-profit group, the Friends of St. Mary's, assumed possession of the church in 1976 and have worked to maintain and restore it as funds allow. Adair today has an estimated six residences and population of less than thirty. Only one vacant building of the former business district remains. Law enforcement is provided by the Adair County Sheriff's Department and fire protection by the Eastern Adair Rural Volunteer Fire Department.
