= Adair County Courthouse =

Adair County Courthouse may refer to:

- Adair County Courthouse (Iowa), Greenfield, Iowa
- Adair County Courthouse (Kentucky), Columbia, Kentucky
- Adair County Courthouse (Missouri), Kirksville, Missouri
- Adair County Courthouse (Oklahoma), Stilwell, Oklahoma
