= Capt. Thomas C. Harris House =

Historic house in Missouri, United States

- U.S. National Register of Historic Places
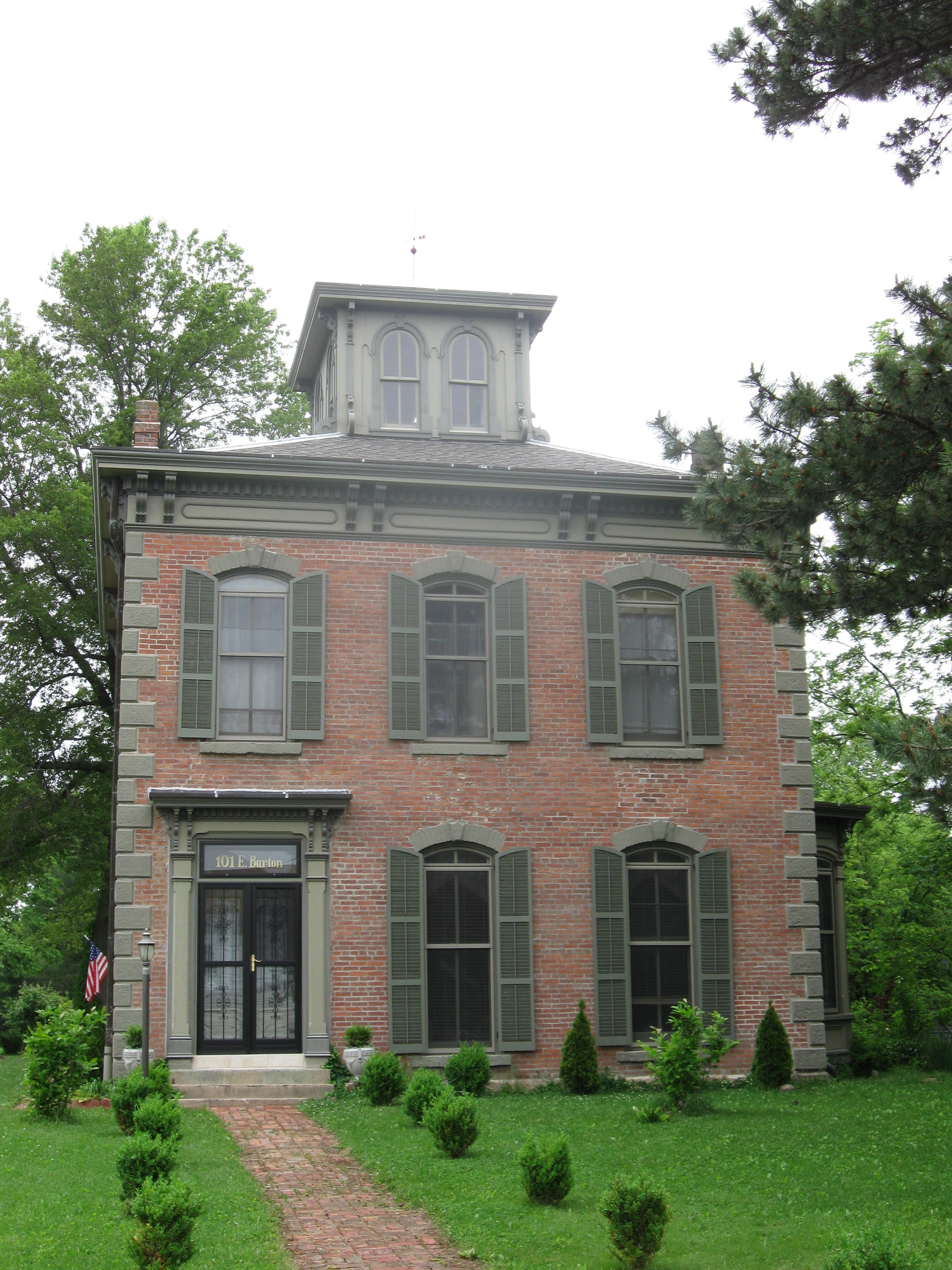
- The Harris House, also known as the Parrish Place

- Location within Missouri Location within the United States
- Location: 101 E. Burton Street, Kirksville, Missouri
- Coordinates: 40°12′19″N 92°34′56″W
- Area: 1 acre (0.40 ha)
- Built: 1875
- Architect: Barker, John
- Architectural style: Italianate
- NRHP reference No.: 73001034
- Added to NRHP: October 15, 1973

The Captain Thomas C. Harris House (also known as the Parrish Place) is a two-story Italianate-style home located at 101 East Burton street in Kirksville, Missouri. A modified "T-plan" Victorian home constructed in 1875, it was listed on the National Register of Historic Places on October 15, 1973.

== History ==
Captain Thomas C. Harris was an officer in the Union Army during the American Civil War. A native of New York, he settled in Kirksville shortly after the conclusion of the war, and was engaged in a succession of woolen mills in the town and vicinity. In 1875 Harris began construction of a large two-story brick home on what was then the northern edge of Kirksville. There is some doubt as to whether Harris ever lived in the home, and for how long, as it was sold in 1879 to another Civil War veteran, Doctor John Burton. Burton served with the Sixth Indiana Cavalry and as president of the United States Pension Board at the war's end before establishing a medical practice in Kirksville in 1867.

The home took on its secondary moniker of "the Parrish Place" in 1895 when it was purchased by Doctor A. Washington Parrish. Parrish had a medical practice in Queen City, Missouri before purchasing the home and moving his practice to Kirksville. Following his death in 1928, the home passed to his son, Doctor Bert Parrish, also a physician and surgeon in the community. Bert Parrish died in 1951, leaving the home to his longtime housekeeper, Everrella Murdock. Murdock had lived on the first floor of the home since 1939.

A fire in 1958 destroyed the summer kitchen, wood shed and coal storage room, but was extinguished before causing any significant damage to the main house. Those areas lost were replaced by the addition of a new section to the home containing a family room. Another major change to the original design came in 1965 when, due to fears of a weakening roof, the distinctive cupola was removed. However, the cupola was restored to its position several years later.

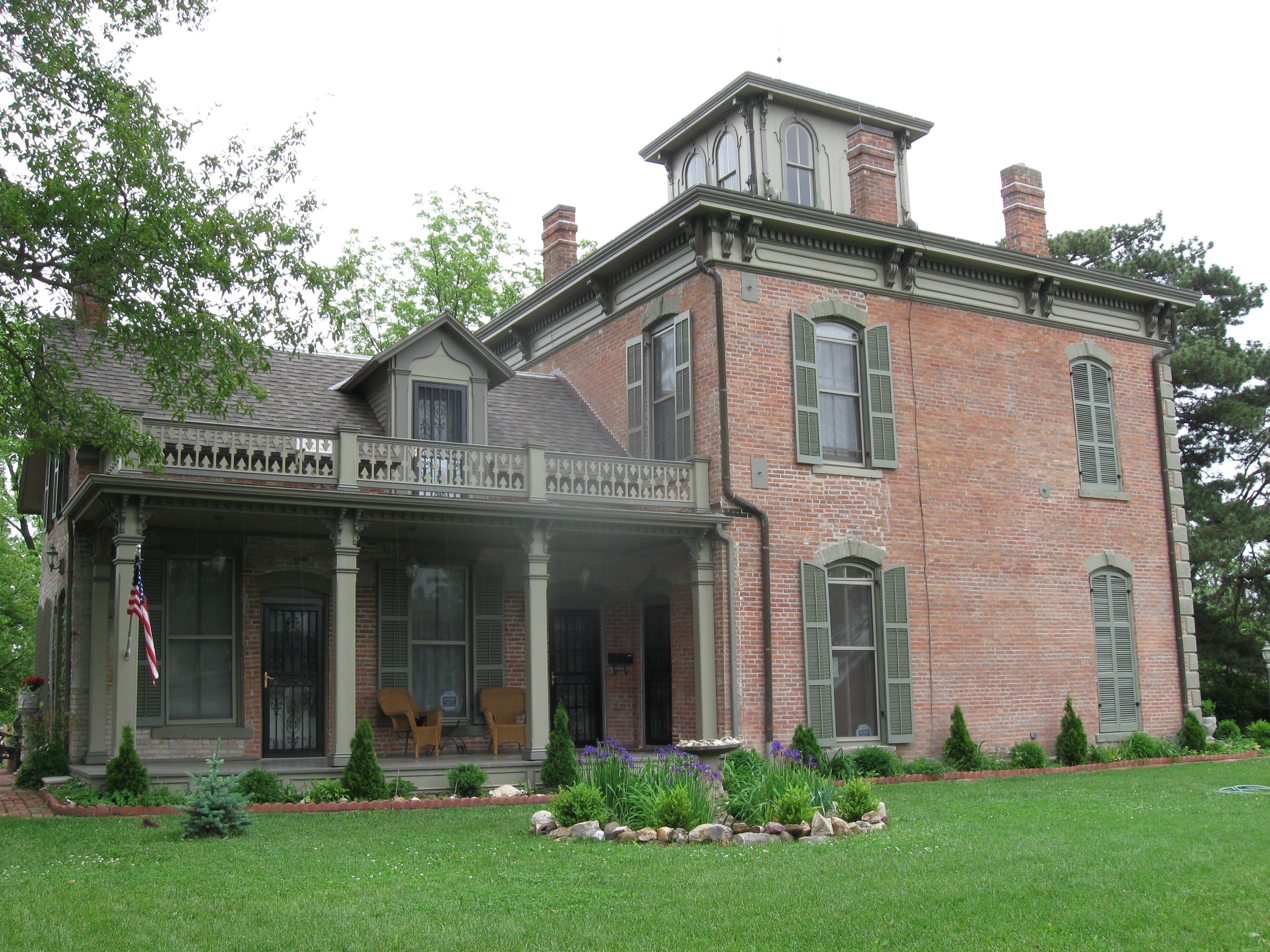
The home after restoration

Upon Murdock's death, the Harris-Parrish home went to her daughter, Mary Childers Sloan, who resided there until moving to Nebraska in the 1980s. The home was mostly vacant from the early 1980s until Sloan's death in April, 2003. She deeded the home and property to the National Trust for Historic Preservation. The present owner, Daryl Shafer, purchased the Harris-Parrish home from the Trust in 2006.

After extensive renovations under the National Historic Trust's ownership and later Shafer's, the home once again appears very much as it would have when first constructed, save for modern electrical, heating and cooling systems, and plumbing. One of the most significant changes involved removing a two-tone exterior paint of cream with dark brown accents and returning the structure to its original red brick. The post-fire additions of a garage and the west wing containing the family room were removed and replaced with a porch and landscaping. In addition to serving as a private residence, the home has also served as a popular spot for weddings, open houses, and community gatherings. One such gathering in 2012 honored the sesquicentennial of the Battle of Kirksville.
