= Robert J. Behnen =

American politician (born 1966)

Robert J. Behnen (born May 8, 1966) is a genealogist and a former Republican member of the Missouri House of Representatives. He currently resides with his wife, Michele McGuire, and their two children, John and Joseph, in Kirksville, Missouri.

He was born in St. Louis, Missouri, and graduated from Lindbergh High School. He served in the United States Army achieving the rank of Sergeant (E-5) from 1984 through 1987, serving with the 1st Cavalry Division and the V Corps Inspector General. He went on to get a B.A. degree from Truman State University in 1991, and an M.B.A. from William Woods University in 1996. He is fluent in German, and owns a small business conducting German genealogical research.

He is a member of the Area Agency on Aging Senior Service Council, the Missouri Arts Council Cultural Trust Board, and the Missouri Humanities Council. He is a former board member of the Kirksville Chamber of Commerce, a past president of the Kirksville R-III School Foundation, and president of the Kirksville Rotary Club. He is a past secretary of the Knights of Columbus, and a past trustee of the Adair County Historical Society. He is also a former board member of the Adair County Family YMCA. He is a member of the Thousand Hills Bass Club, the National Wild Turkey Federation, and Ducks Unlimited.

He was first elected to the Missouri House of Representatives in 2000 and served three terms. He sought the 18th District seat in the State Senate in 2006, but was defeated by Wes Shoemeyer. In the election, his opposition ran an ad strongly hinting that Behnen received quid pro quo campaign contributions from beneficiaries of his insertion into an omnibus dentistry bill of provisions that would allow convicted felons to be licensed as bail bondsmen after fifteen years . Behnen has been quoted as saying, "...laws are made all the time to benefit one person. That's not uncommon at all."

Behnen served on the following committees:

- Professional Registration and Licensing (chair)
- Elementary and Secondary Education (vice chair)
- Budget
