= Kirksville Courthouse Square Historic District =

Historic district in Missouri, United States

- U.S. National Register of Historic Places
- U.S. Historic district
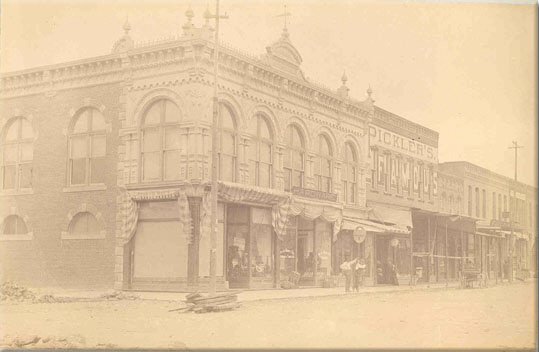
- Pickler’s Famous Store (second from left), 1893

- Location within Missouri Location within the United States
- Location: 200 block N. Franklin St., 100 block E. Harrison St., 100 block W. Harrison St., Kirksville, Missouri
- Coordinates: 40°11′44″N 92°35′1″W
- Area: 2.5 acres (1.0 ha)
- Built: 1883
- Architect: Kirsch, Robert G.; Dunbar, Irwin
- Architectural style: Romanesque, Italianate, neo-classical revival
- NRHP reference No.: 09000330
- Added to NRHP: May 21, 2009

Kirksville Courthouse Square Historic District is a national historic district located at Kirksville, Adair County, Missouri. The district encompasses 10 contributing buildings and 2 contributing objects in the central business district of Kirksville. It developed between 1883 and 1925, and includes representative examples of Italianate, Romanesque Revival, and Classical Revival style architecture. Located in the district is the separately listed Adair County Courthouse. Other notable buildings include the Union Meat Market (c.1890; façade c. 1905), Irwin Davis Sheet Metal Company (c. 1905), Baxter-Miller Apartment Building (1925), Ivie's Hotel (1883), and Pickler's Famous Store (1887).

It was listed on the National Register of Historic Places in 2009.
