= The Monitor (student zine) =

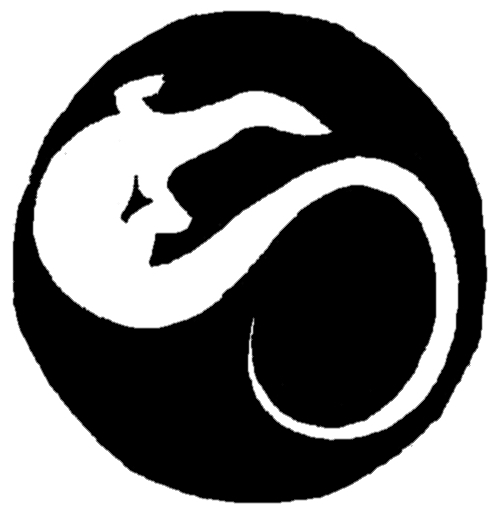
- Frequency: monthly
- Founded: 1995
- Country: United States
- Based in: Kirksville, MO
- Language: English

The Monitor is an alternative campus zine out of Kirksville, Missouri. It is a student-run publication of Truman State University. The primary purpose is to "provide an uncensored, public platform for members of the Truman community to express themselves freely in whatever form that can take." An archive of all issues can be found at trumanmonitor.flounder.online and most can also be found on Issuu.
