= Trinity Episcopal Church (Kirksville, Missouri) =

Historic church in Missouri, United States

- U.S. National Register of Historic Places
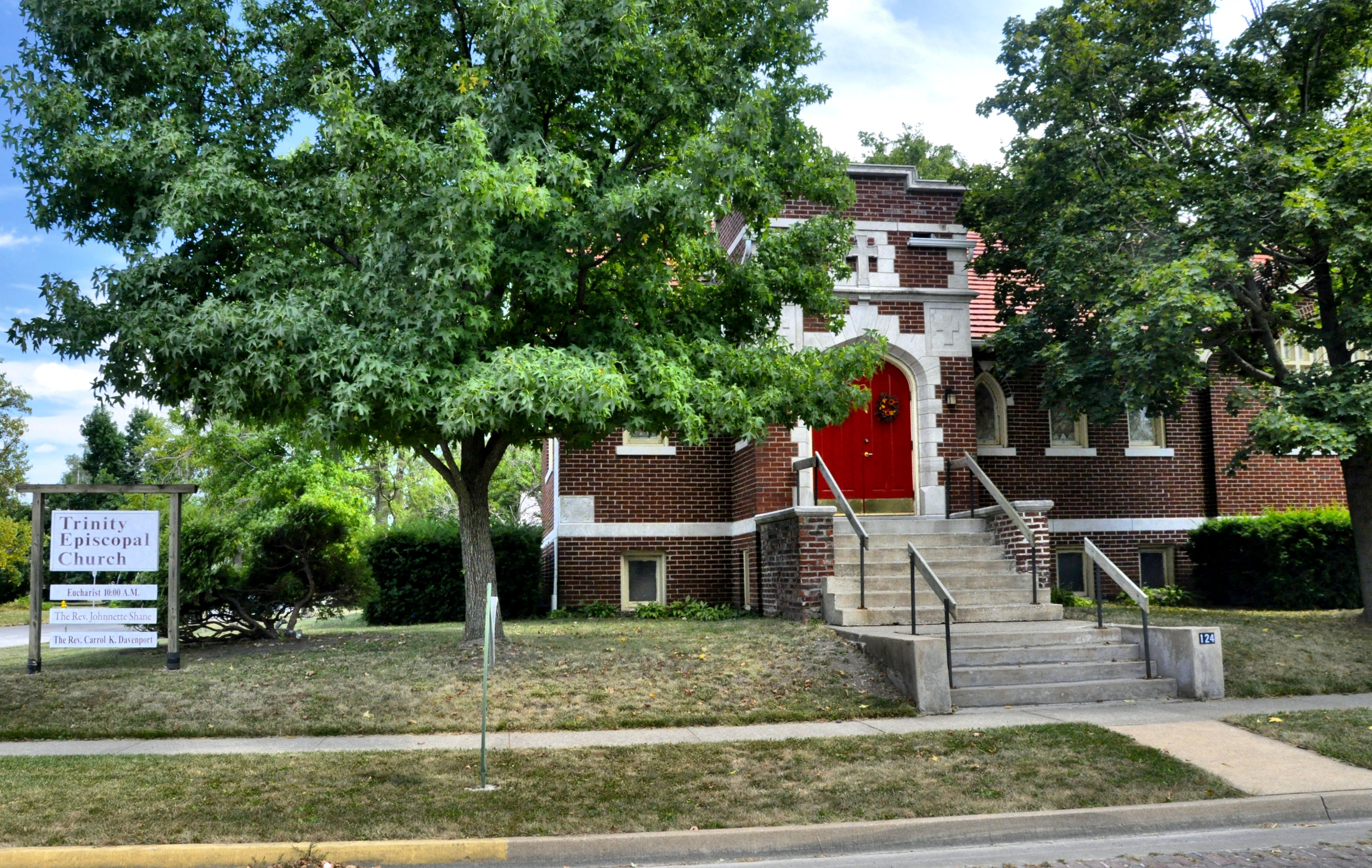

- Location within Missouri Location within the United States
- Location: 124 N Mulanix St., Kirksville, Missouri
- Coordinates: 40°11′50″N 92°34′47″W
- Area: less than one acre
- Built: 1917
- Architect: Dunbar, Irwin; Eggert and Russell
- Architectural style: Bungalow/craftsman, Gothic Revival
- NRHP reference No.: 07001338
- Added to NRHP: January 2, 2008

Trinity Episcopal Church is a historic Episcopal church building at 124 N Mulanix Street in Kirksville, Missouri, United States. Displaying an eclectic style, it was placed on the National Register of Historic Places in January, 2008. The church building is the second-oldest in Kirksville to be in continuous use by a congregation.

== History ==
The Trinity Episcopal Church congregation has been a mainstay in the Kirksville area since 1870, when first established as an outreach mission. The first church building, a wooden structure, was constructed in 1870 on the site of the current church and served the congregation until 1916. A fire in 1907 caused major damage and despite repairs it was apparent the original building would not remain usable. In October, 1915 the congregation petitioned the Episcopal Diocese for assistance and were successful in reaching an agreement on financing.

Well-known local architect and congregation member, Irwin Dunbar was selected to design the new building and during 1916 the former wooden structure was razed to clear path for the new church. Construction was begun in the spring of 1917 with the local firm of Eggert & Russel chosen for the task. The cornerstone was laid on May 14, 1917, and building progressed rapidly with the consecration of the new church on November 7, 1917. Total completion cost for the project was $11,555, the Diocese contributing $5,500.

The building was constructed in a bungalow/craftsman, Gothic Revival style with the finished dimensions approximately 37 feet by 67 feet. With the 1907 fire still fresh in their minds, the congregation chose the slightly higher cost of a brick structure as opposed to wood. The building is somewhat asymmetrical in nature and sits atop a raised basement. When designing the interior, Irwin Dunbar chose some features that reflected not only a blend of Craftsman and Gothic Revival styles, but his own background as an engineer. Most notable of those are the open beam ceiling in the nave, constructed of black walnut. These trusses provided support for the heavy English tile roof, yet kept the worship area free of cumbersome columns. Black walnut was used extensively throughout the interior for trim, window frames, and other ancillary features.

== Today ==
The sanctuary is very much as originally designed and constructed. The replacement of a section of flat roof with an inclined one in 1998, has taken place. Save for upgrades in electrical, plumbing, and HVAC, the interior is largely untouched. An accessibility project in 2015, designed by Chinn, Rother, and Associates, of Columbia, Missouri, added a new wing to add accessibility improvements, including a lift, a new, wider entrance, and restrooms. As part of this project, one of the original stained glass windows was moved from the sanctuary to the new addition.

=== Wicks Pipe Organ ===
The church features a pipe organ, built in 1967 by Wicks Organ Company of Highland, Illinois, with an additional Dulzian rank added later. The electro-pneumatic organ is at the front of the room, and exposed pipes. The organ was renovated by Quimby Pipe Organs of Warrensburg, Missouri in 2015.
