= Bear Creek Baptist Church =

Historic church in Missouri, United States

- U.S. National Register of Historic Places
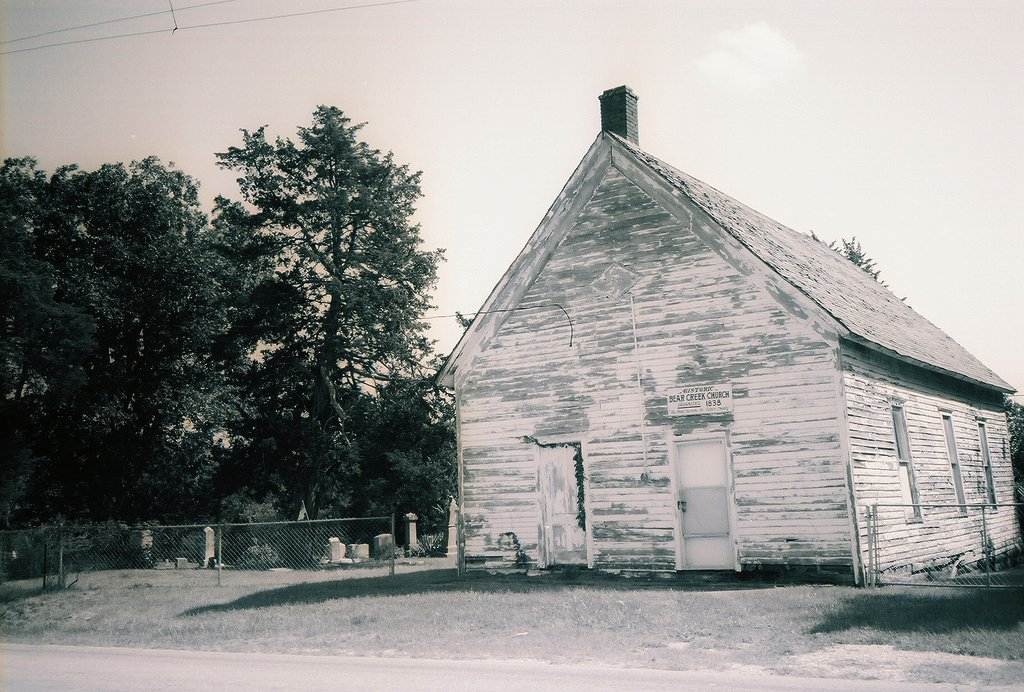

- Location within Missouri Location within the United States
- Location: N of Kirksville off US 63, near Kirksville, Missouri
- Coordinates: 40°14′30″N 92°37′31″W
- Area: 1.4 acres (0.57 ha)
- Built: 1860
- NRHP reference No.: 84002132
- Added to NRHP: March 29, 1984

Bear Creek Baptist Church was a historic Baptist church in Adair County, Missouri. It was located approximately four miles northwest of Kirksville on Missouri Route B. Built in 1860, the church was added to the National Register of Historic Places in 1984. The church is no longer standing. The church, adjoining cemetery, and surrounding acreage are owned and maintained by the non-profit organization, Bear Creek Cemetery Association of Adair County.

== History ==
The Bear Creek Baptist congregation was the earliest organized Christian group in Adair County, dating to the late 1830s. Previously only small groups of neighbors would gather in private homes at various points in the county. Reverend Talbot Hight is recognized as the chief organizer of the congregation, in the period of late 1838 - early 1839. No funds or land were available to build a proper building and sanctuary, so for the first years of the congregation's existence private homes were used for services, with the Reverend Lewis Connor as pastor. Following Connor's 1856 death he was interred on a portion of his land informally deeded to the Bear Creek congregation for purposes of a church and cemetery. The exact date of construction for the current building isn't known, but commonly accepted as sometime in 1860. The disruption caused by the American Civil War meant that the building wasn't finished until sometime in 1865.

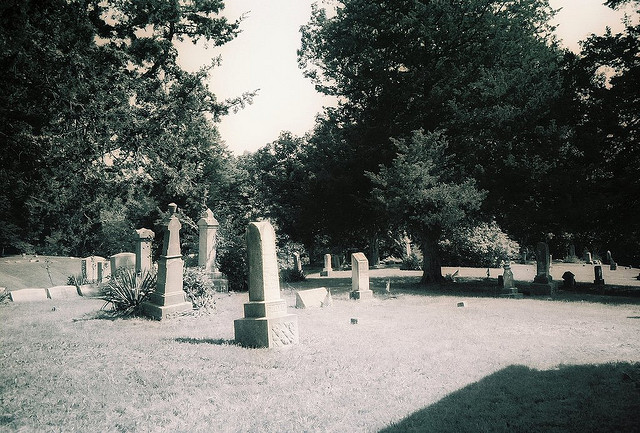
Cemetery adjacent to Bear Creek Baptist Church.

The church continued to grow through the remainder of the 19th century. However membership began to decline in the early 1900s until finally the last regularly scheduled services were held there on February 7, 1914. In October, 1946 a group from the First Baptist Church of Kirksville dedicated a large boulder with plaque on the site in honor of its status as the first church in the county. The cemetery continued in use long after the church had ceased regular services, the last known burials being in 1979. Among the local notables buried in the Bear Creek cemetery is Samuel Withrow, the first postmaster in Adair County, buried there in 1852. In May, 1982 a non-profit corporation, the aforementioned Bear Creek Cemetery Association of Adair County, was established to care for the property and building. Among their first projects was to secure the site's placement on the National Register of Historic Places. The Bear Creek Church survived a close call with Mother Nature in 2009. On May 13 of that year a tornado estimated as an EF2 on the Enhanced Fujita Scale passed near the church as it left a path of death and destruction from Novinger to Kirksville. Two Adair County residents were killed by the tornado about one mile from the church.
