= Sojourners Club =

- U.S. National Register of Historic Places
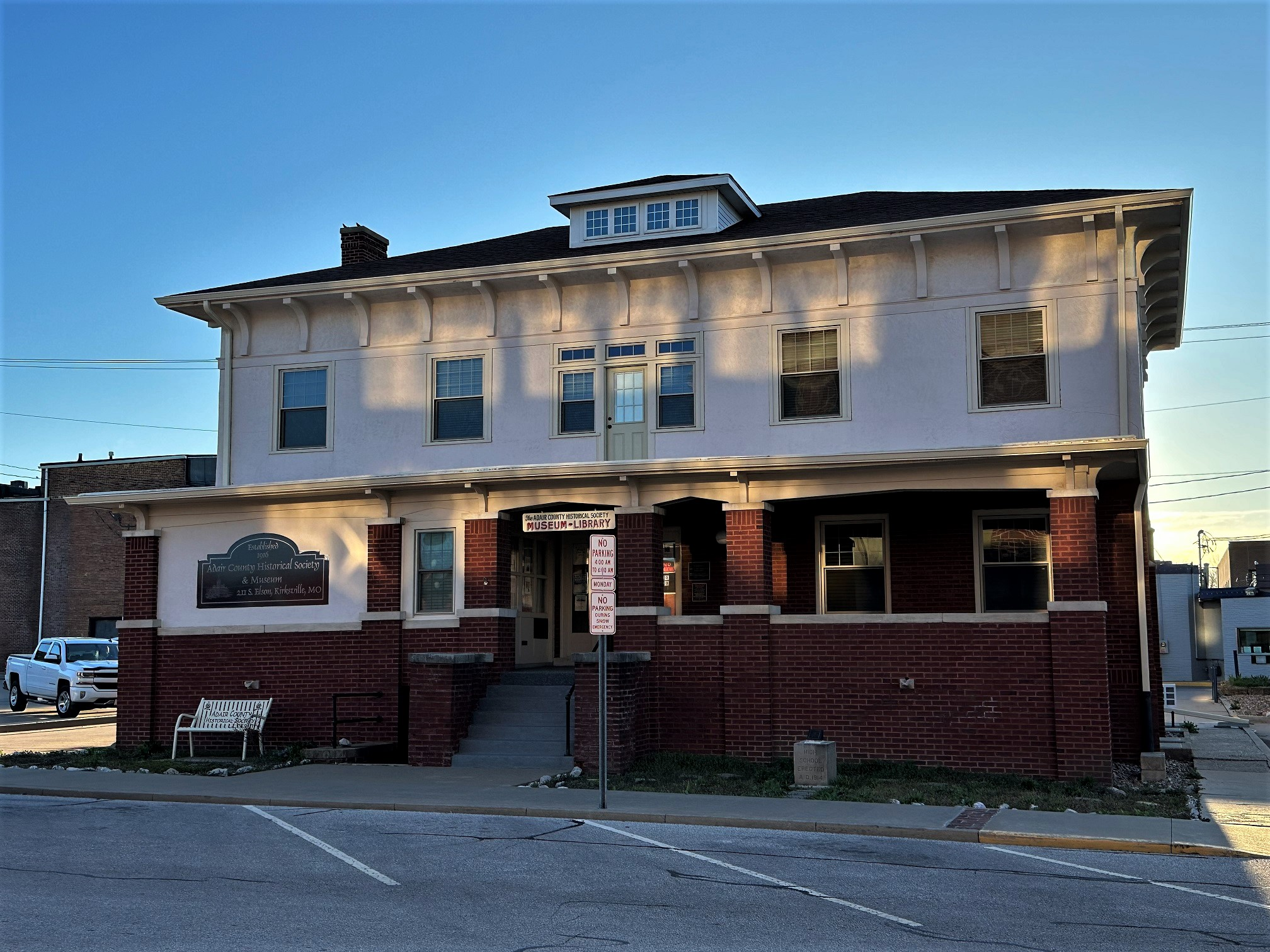
- Sojourners Club building in 2024

- Location within Missouri Location within the United States
- Location: 211 S. Elson St. Kirksville, Missouri
- Coordinates: 40°11′36″N 92°35′03″W
- Area: Less than 1 acre (0.40 ha)
- Built: 1916
- Architect: Dunbar, Irwin
- Architectural style: Prairie School; Bungalow/Craftsman
- NRHP reference No.: 14000048
- Added to NRHP: March 11, 2014

Sojourners Club is a historic women's club and public library building located at Kirksville, Adair County, Missouri. It was built in 1916, and is a two-story, Prairie School / American Craftsman style rectangular brick and stucco building. The building measures approximately 34 feet by 56 feet. It features a full-width, one-story verandah and second-story terrace.

It was listed on the National Register of Historic Places in 2014.
