= Journal Printing Company Building =

- U.S. National Register of Historic Places
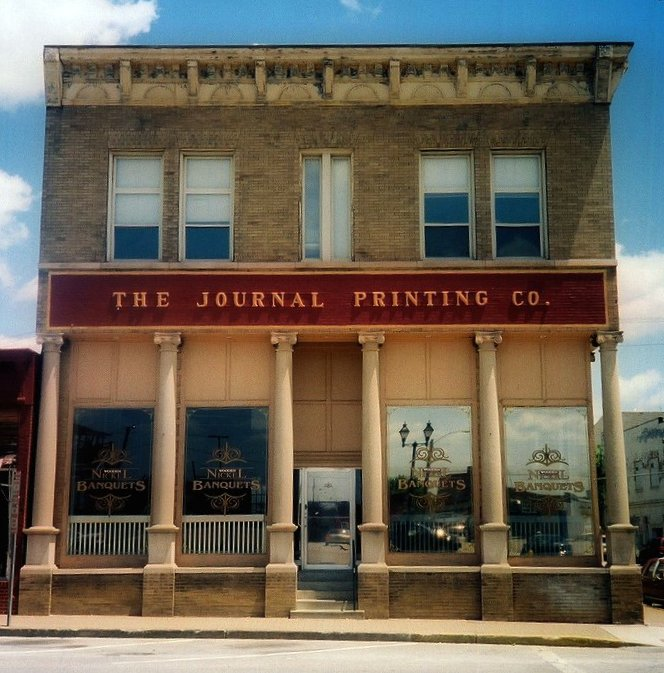
- Journal Printing Building, November 2012

- Location within Missouri Location within the United States
- Location: 211 S. Elson St., Kirksville, Missouri
- Coordinates: 40°11′40″N 92°35′03″W
- Area: Less than 1 acre (0.40 ha)
- Built: 1905
- Architect: Anderson, Charles C.
- Architectural style: Two-part commercial block
- NRHP reference No.: 11000439
- Added to NRHP: July 14, 2011

Journal Printing Company Building, also known as the Dockery Building, is a historic commercial building located at Kirksville, Adair County, Missouri.

== History ==
It was built in 1905, and is a rectangular, two‐story, five-bay, buff brick two-part commercial block over a raised basement. It measures 40 feet by 108 feet. The building an ornate Italianate style metal cornice and six smooth, slender shafts with Ionic order capitals supporting a brick frieze at the first floor. It was listed on the National Register of Historic Places in 2011.
