= Grim Building =

- The Grim Building
- U.S. National Register of Historic Places
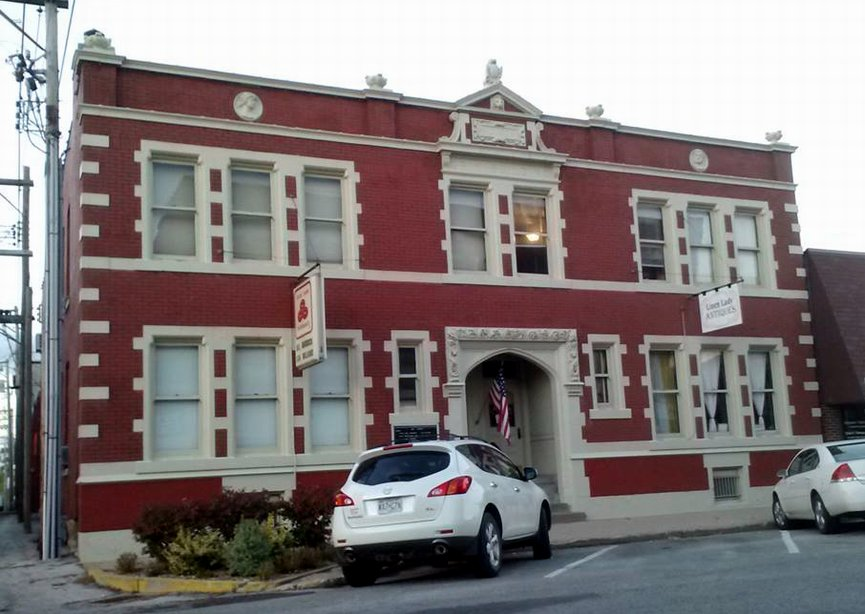
- The Grim Building in 2013

- Location within Missouri
- Location: 113 - 115 E. Washington St., Kirksville
- Coordinates: 40°11′43″N 92°34′52″W
- Built: 1905
- Architect: Weber & Groves
- Architectural style: Jacobethan Revival
- NRHP reference No.: 79001343
- Added to NRHP: June 27, 1979

The Grim Building is an office building and former medical clinic located in Kirksville, Missouri. Constructed in the Jacobethan Revival style in 1905, it was placed on the National Register of Historic Places in June, 1979.

== History ==
Brothers Ezra and Edward Grim, both physicians, had a desire to consolidate their medical practices under one roof. In 1904 they contracted with the St. Louis, Missouri architectural firm of Weber and Groves for a building large enough to house offices, examination rooms and operating suites. Local contractor Albert L. Holmes was chosen for the construction, which was finished in October, 1905 for a final cost of $11,248. This was considered only slightly higher than a similar size building of more utilitarian design, surprising considering the ornate details often associated with a Jacobethan Revival building.

The exterior is of red brick with white accent stones and trim around the windows. Great detail was given to the main entrance, a hooded limestone basket-handle arch with considerable ornamentation. An adjacent carriage house still remains from the original construction, though it has been heavily renovated over the years to provide more office and retail space. The Grims spared little expense on the interior either, with plentiful high-quality oak woodwork throughout and Tennessee marble in the main first floor hallway. Several fireplaces in the building feature ornate metal screens and green glazed tile in the immediate floor area.

The Grim brothers used the eastern half of the first floor for outpatient surgery and treatment rooms until they established the Grim Brothers Hospital in 1910. A new hospital building was completed for them just south of the First District Normal School; however, Edward Grim continued to use the original building for his office until his death in 1936.

The brothers' partnership went on hiatus for a time beginning in 1917 when Ezra Grim joined the U.S. Army Medical Corps, serving in France during World War I. They would continue in partnership with the hospital until their retirement while also maintaining ownership of the original building, renting out office space to other businesses. The ownership of the building remained within the extended Grim family until 1970 when a grandnephew sold it to outside investors.

Plans were put forth in the 1980s to demolish the building and replace it with more parking for downtown businesses, despite the buildings' very good condition. However, public outcry, and new ownership of the building, prevented the demolition from happening. Renovation and restoration returned the Grim Building to an appearance much like it did when first constructed, save for modern lighting, heating and cooling, and some carpeted areas of individual offices.

Although not a museum by intent, the interior decor of the building features many items and photos that chronicle the medical history of Kirksville, from osteopaths like Andrew Taylor Still to medical doctors such as the Grim brothers.

== Gallery ==
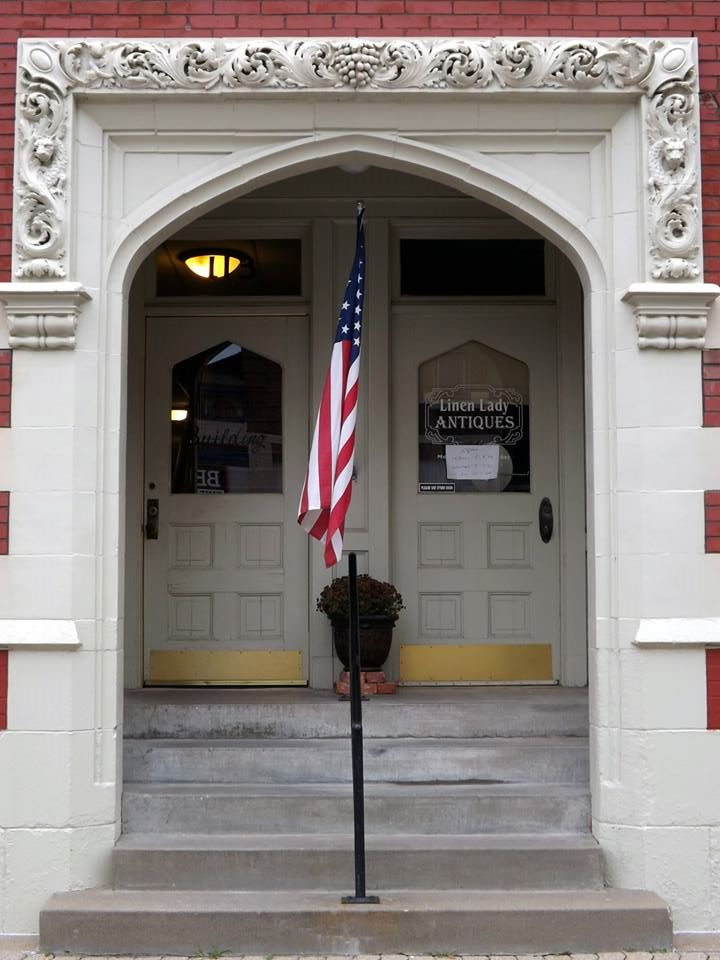
Entryway to Grim Building.

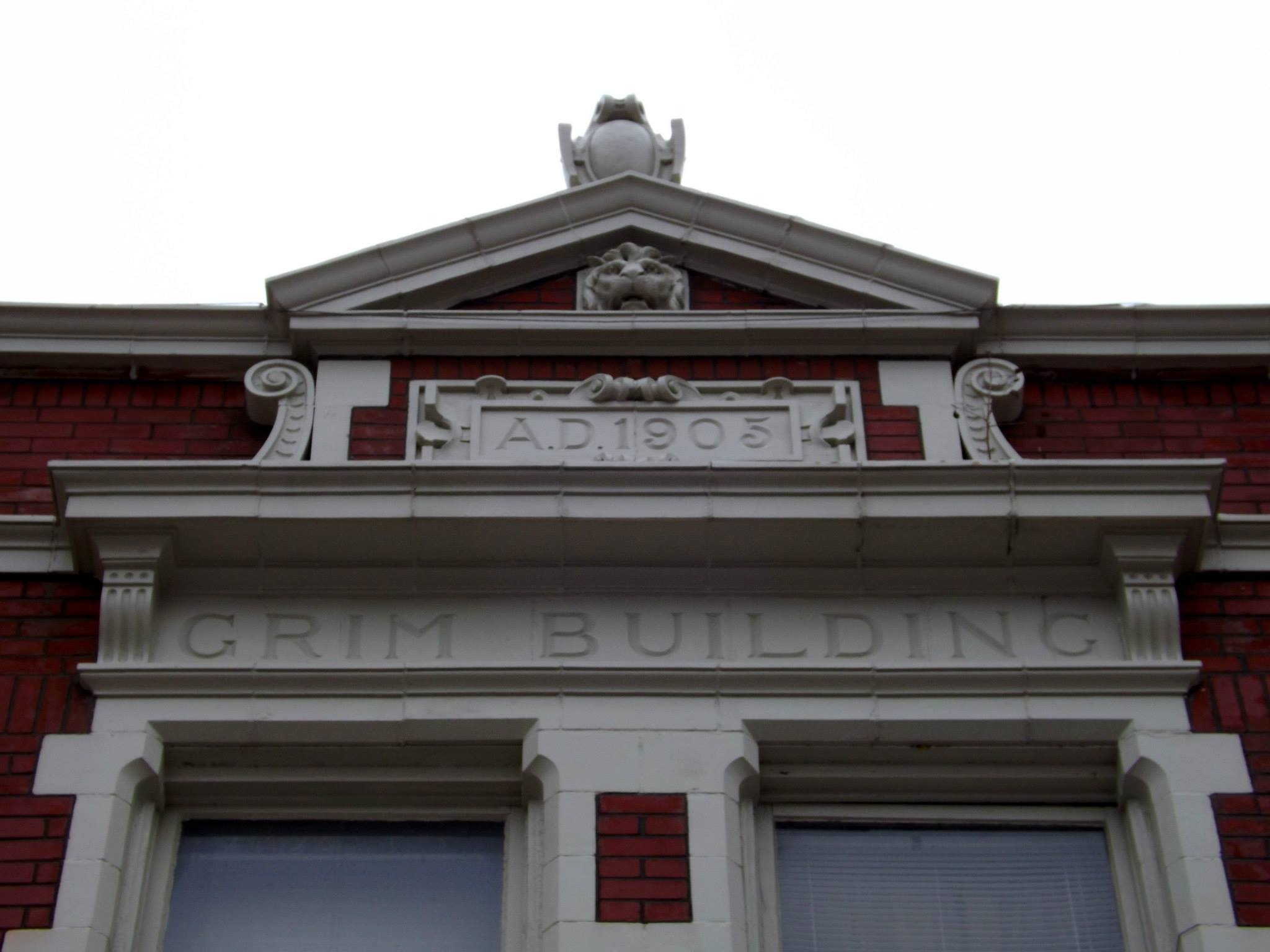
Ornamentation above the doorway of the Grim Building.

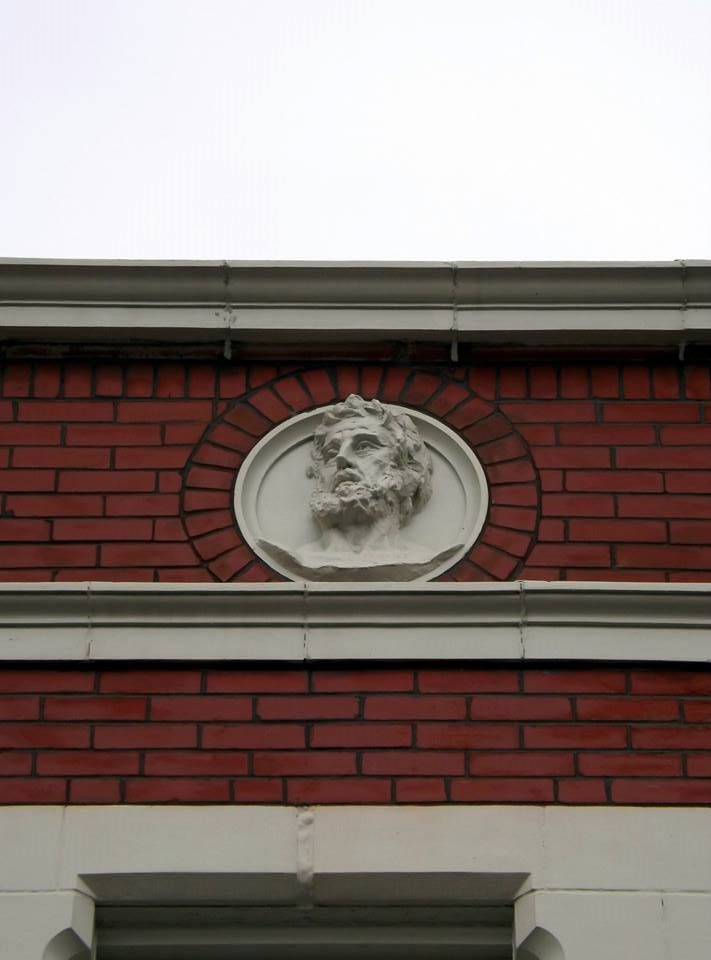
Detail on the front exterior. The man's face is complemented by that of a woman's opposite the entrance.

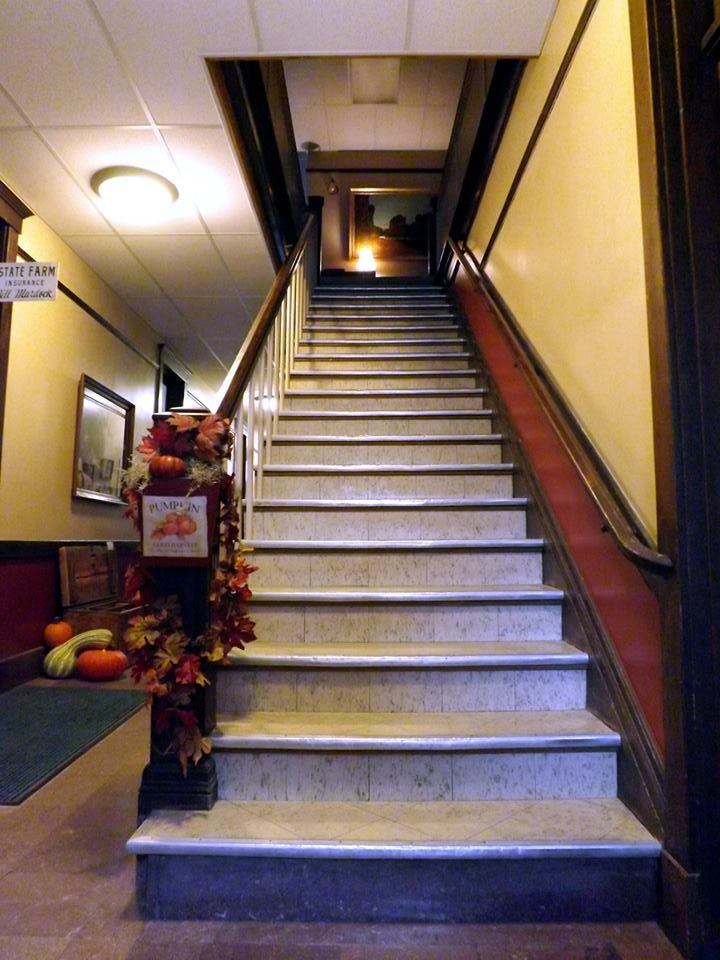
Main stairway of the Grim Building in Kirksville, Missouri.

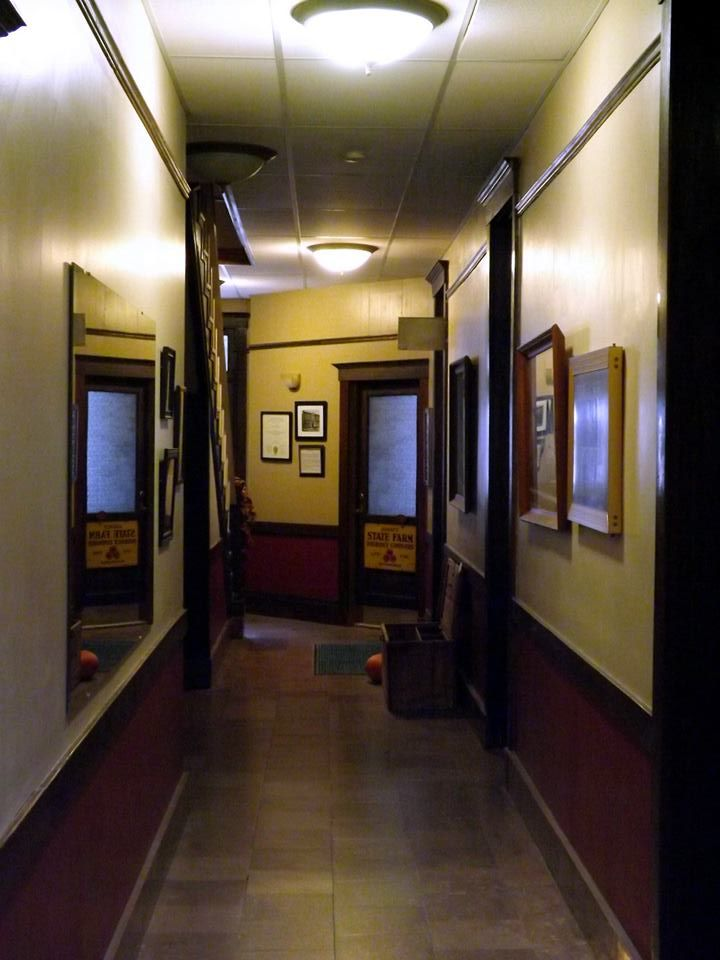
Second floor hallway of the Grim Building in Kirksville, Missouri. Photos and displays highlight the town's medical history.
