= Dr. E. Sanborn Smith House =

Historic house in Missouri, United States

- U.S. National Register of Historic Places
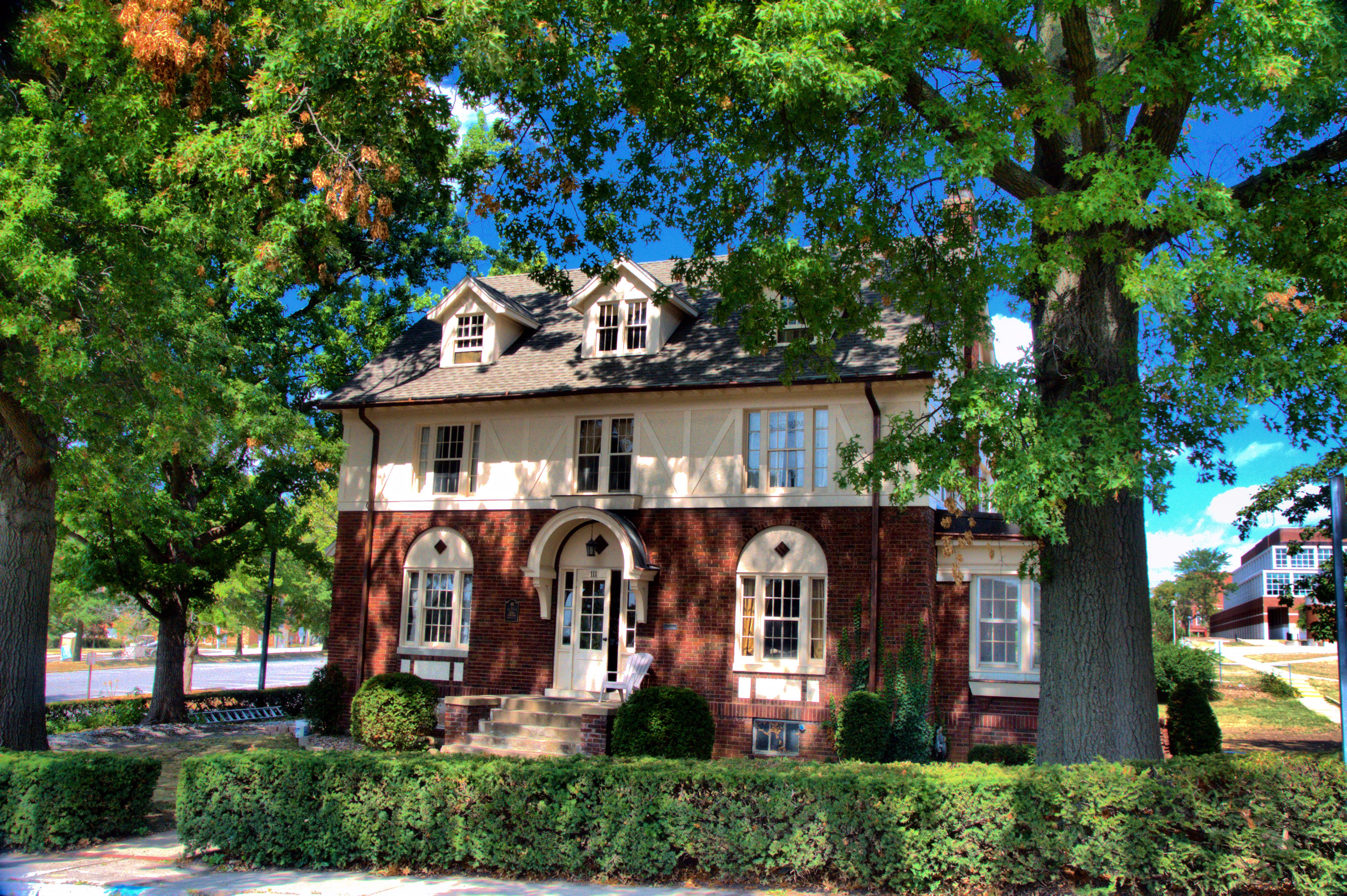
- Dr E. Sanborn Smith House, September 2013

- Location within Missouri Location within the United States
- Location: 111 E. Patterson St., Kirksville, Missouri
- Coordinates: 40°11′19″N 92°34′58″W
- Area: less than one acre
- Built: 1925
- Architect: Abt, Ludwig; Geoghegan, W.M.
- Architectural style: Colonial Revival
- NRHP reference No.: 08001385
- Added to NRHP: January 30, 2009

Dr. E. Sanborn Smith House, also known as the King House, is a historic home located at Kirksville, Adair County, Missouri. It was built in 1925, and is a 2 1/2-story, T-shaped, Colonial Revival style brick and stucco dwelling. It has a side-gable roof with dormers and features decorative half-timbering on the second floor.

== History ==
Located adjacent to the Truman State University campus, the King House was designed for Dr. E. Sanborn Smith in late 1924 by architect Ludwig Abt (1882-1967) of Moberly, MO. Kirksville contractor William M. Geoghegan (1865-1949) completed construction in 1925.

E. Sanborn Smith, MD (1875-1950), a Macon County, MO native, earned his medical degree at the University of Maryland in 1900. After practicing in Massachusetts and serving in the US Army Medical Corps during World War I, he returned to Missouri in 1923 and entered into partnership with Drs. Ezra C. and Edward A. Grim in the Grim-Smith Hospital, Kirksville. He built this house directly across the street from the hospital and lived there until his death in 1950. His widow, Emily (Frey) Smith (1875-1969), remained in the home until her death nineteen years later.

The Smiths’ daughter, Emily Montague Frey (Smith) King (1912-2006), and her husband, William Boyd King (1914-1990), also resided in the house from the mid-1940s until their respective deaths. They began sharing the home with Emily's parents when Boyd, a 1937 graduate of Northeast Missouri State Teachers College (now Truman State University), returned to his alma mater as Head Basketball Coach in 1946.

== Current status ==
The home is now owned by the King Foundation, a charitable trust created by Mrs. King. The Smith House was placed on the National Register of Historic Places in January 2009.
