= Orie J. Smith Black and White Stock Farm Historic District =

Historic district in Missouri, United States

- U.S. National Register of Historic Places
- U.S. Historic district
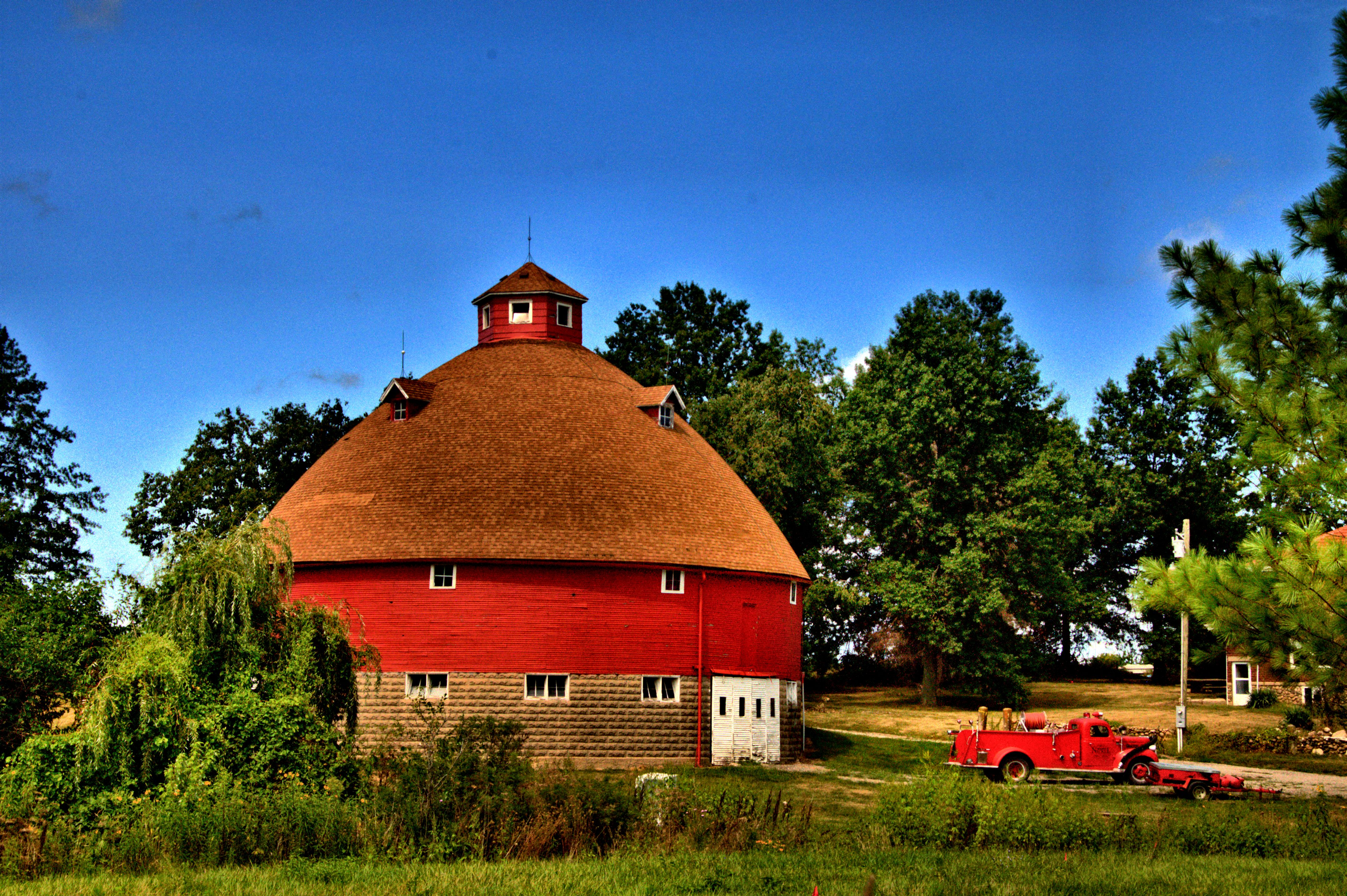
- Orie J. Smith Round Barn, September 2013

- Location within Missouri Location within the United States
- Nearest city: 0.5 miles SE of Jct. of MO P and Co. Rd. 129B, near Kirksville, Missouri
- Coordinates: 40°13′32″N 92°33′33″W
- Area: 8 acres (3.2 ha)
- Architectural style: round barn
- NRHP reference No.: 00001658
- Added to NRHP: January 16, 2001

Orie J. Smith Black and White Stock Farm Historic District is a historic farm and national historic district located near Kirksville, Adair County, Missouri. The district encompasses six contributing buildings and one contributing structures on a farm about three miles northeast of Kirksville. It developed between 1910 and 1919, and features a round bank barn with a self-supporting dome roof, constructed in 1913. The other contributing resources in the district are the farmhouse, an American Foursquare with Prairie School affinities (1917), a granary (1910), a poultry house (1918) and two ice houses (both 1919), and a concrete bridge (1914).

It was listed on the National Register of Historic Places in 2001.

The bank barn and surrounding property is the current venue for the Round Barn Blues Festival, a semi-annual music festival bringing in local talent, as well as performers from around the region and the country. The festival is held during the first Saturday of every April or May, and the last Saturday of every September.
