= Dockery Hotel =

- U.S. National Register of Historic Places
- Location within Missouri Location within the United States
- Location: Elson & McPherson Sts., Kirksville, Missouri
- Coordinates: 40°11′38″N 92°35′4″W
- Area: less than one acre
- Built: 1891
- NRHP reference No.: 83000971
- Added to NRHP: February 10, 1983

Dockery Hotel was a historic hotel located at Kirksville, Adair County, Missouri. It was built in 1891, and was a two-story, U-shaped brick building. It featured an ornate pressed metal second story front facade with unusual corner columns with enlarged capitals and piers. It was destroyed in 1991.

It was listed on the National Register of Historic Places in 1983.
