= Drs. George and Blanche Laughlin House =

Historic house in Missouri, United States

- U.S. National Register of Historic Places
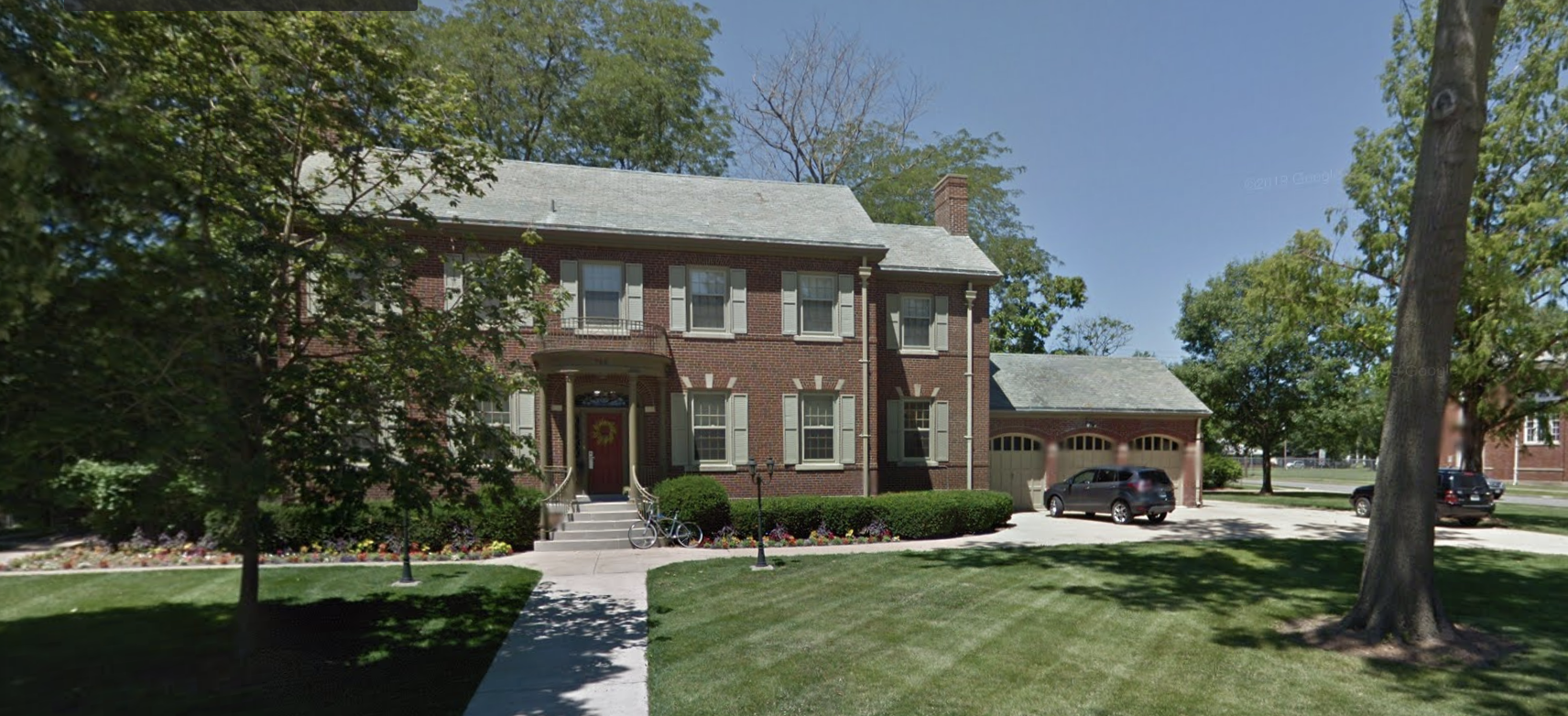

- Location within Missouri Location within the United States
- Location: 706 S. Halliburton St., Kirksville, Missouri
- Coordinates: 40°11′22″N 92°34′37″W
- Area: 1.63 acres (0.66 ha)
- Built: 1937
- Built by: Leonard Poehlman
- Architect: Bonsack & Pearce
- Architectural style: Colonial Revival
- NRHP reference No.: 14000047
- Added to NRHP: March 11, 2014

Drs. George and Blanche Laughlin House is a historic home located at Kirksville, Adair County, Missouri. It was built in 1925, and is a two-story, Colonial Revival style rectangular brick dwelling with a two-story kitchen wing and attached garage. It features a semicircular front portico supported by Corinthian order columns and with curved steps.

The Laughlin House currently serves as the designated residence for Truman State University's president. The space is used for University events primarily.

It was listed on the National Register of Historic Places in 2014.
