= Travelers Hotel (Kirksville, Missouri) =

- U.S. National Register of Historic Places
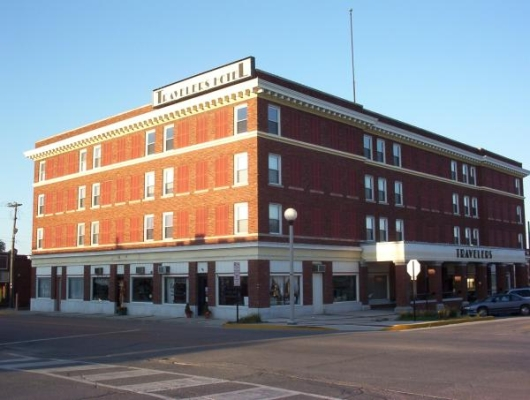
- Kirksville Traveler's Hotel, January 2011

- Location within Missouri Location within the United States
- Location: 301 W. Washington St., Kirksville, Missouri
- Coordinates: 40°11′40″N 92°35′8″W
- Area: less than one acre
- Built: 1923-1924
- Architect: Sanneman, Raymond H.; McKim & Rollins
- Architectural style: Early Commercial
- NRHP reference No.: 09000718
- Added to NRHP: September 16, 2009

Travelers Hotel is a historic hotel located at Kirksville, Adair County, Missouri. It was built in 1923–1924, and is a four-story, brick building that consists of two wings flanking a central core. It has commercial storefronts on the first floor and features a centrally placed flat roof porch with Doric order piers and a wide metal cornice.

It was listed on the National Register of Historic Places in 2009.
