= Masonic Temple (Kirksville, Missouri) =

- U.S. National Register of Historic Places
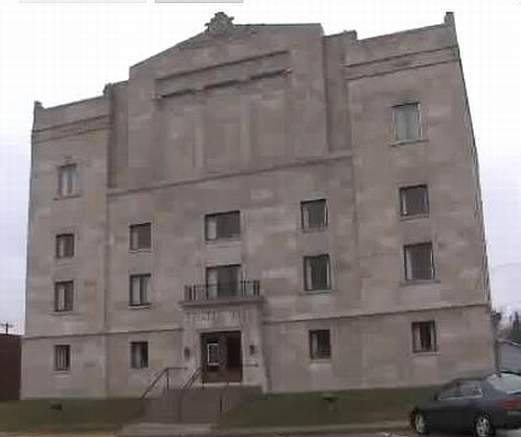
- Exterior view, south side and entrance.

- Location within Missouri Location within the United States
- Location: 217 E. Harrison St., Kirksville
- Coordinates: 40°11′44.06″N 92°34′54.78″W
- Built: 1930
- Architectural style: Egyptian Revival
- NRHP reference No.: 09001208
- Added to NRHP: January 7, 2010

The Masonic Temple in Kirksville, Missouri serves as the home for Kirksville Lodge No. 105 A.F. & A.M., Adair Lodge No. 366 A.F. & A.M., Kirksville Chapter No. 184 O.E.S., Caldwell Chapter No. 53 R.A.M., Kirksville Council No. 44 R.&S.M., and Ely Commandery No. 22 K.T. The structure was listed on the National Register of Historic Places on January 7, 2010.

== History ==
Freemasonry in Adair County, Missouri dates back prior to the American Civil War, with the first lodge, Kirksville Lodge No. 128 A.F. & A.M., chartered in May, 1850. Following the war a large number of various Masonic lodges and affiliated organizations flourished within the county and at its height the combined membership county-wide totaled over three thousand members. There proved a need and great desire for one central meeting point large enough for all activities instead of the scattered rental facilities then in use, so in 1919 the Masonic Temple Association was formed, a building site chosen, and fundraising efforts begun. Two wealthy local Osteopathic physicians, Doctors George M. Laughlin and Harry M. Still, both Masons, provided the bulk of the financing for the project, with the issuing of bonds covering the rest.

=== Construction ===
The building site, at 217 East Harrison Street, was in the heart of the Kirksville business district and two blocks east of the town square. In 1927 the St. Louis firm of Bonsack & Pearce was chosen for the architectural design. The result would be a four-story building in the Egyptian Revival style. The Kirksville temple is one of only two in Missouri in that particular style the other being in St. Louis. The cornerstone was laid on April 2, 1930 by Grand Master of the Grand Lodge of Missouri, Mr. Samuel L. Fleet. Among the contents were a Bible, Masonic apron, various Masonic documents, and a book listing all the Adair Countians killed in World War I. The original plan was to build the temple using yellow brick for the entire exterior. However Mr. Leonard Poelman, local Mason and the projects contractor, had connections with a stone company in Carthage, Missouri and was able to arrange for a quantity of fine limestone at a discounted price. Thus it was decided to use the yellow brick on the lesser-seen west and north exteriors while the south and east would receive the Carthage stone. Construction was done at a rapid pace, with completion and dedication in December, 1930 at a final cost at just under $70,000.

== The finished building ==
The completed temple was rectangular, approximately 55 feet by 77 feet, with main entrances located on the east and south sides flanked by pylons and ornate cavetto moldings. The first floor consists of the kitchen and a large dining room with seating for up to 250, while a single large meeting room can be found on the second floor. The third floor is dedicated to offices for the various Masonic secretaries and the lodges recreation room. The fourth floor is reserved for use by the York Rite bodies. The building interior is much the same as it was in 1930, save for the upgrades to more modern appliances.

=== Notable visitor ===
In the early 1940s the Kirksville Masonic Temple was visited by future U.S. President Harry S. Truman. At the time Truman was Grand Master of the Grand Lodge of Missouri A.F. & A.M. while also a United States Senator for Missouri.
