= St. Mary's Church (Adair, Missouri) =

Historic church in Missouri, United States

- U.S. National Register of Historic Places
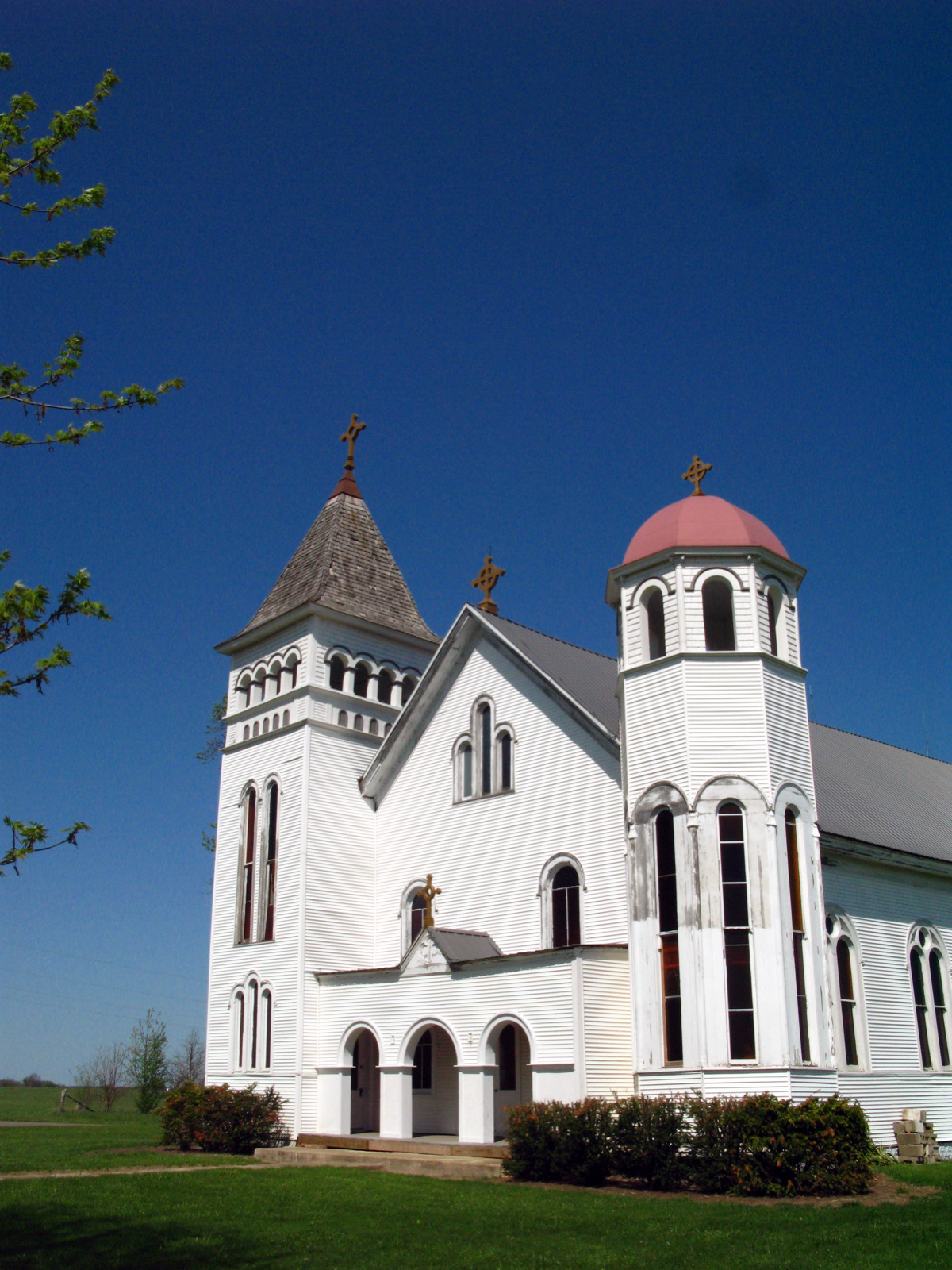
- St. Mary's Church in April, 2007.

- Location within Missouri Location within the United States
- Location: On MO 11, Adair, Missouri
- Coordinates: 40°15′8″N 92°22′27″W
- Area: 4 acres (1.6 ha)
- Built: 1904-1905
- Architect: John Barker
- Architectural style: Romanesque
- NRHP reference No.: 74001069
- Added to NRHP: December 16, 1974

St. Mary's Church is a historic turn-of-the-20th century Catholic church located in the unincorporated community of Adair, 12 miles northeast of Kirksville, Adair County, Missouri, on Missouri Route 11. An example of Romanesque Revival architecture, it is one of the few wood-frame structures in that style still remaining in the United States. St. Mary's was constructed in 1904, and was added to the National Register of Historic Places in 1974. It is now owned and managed by Friends of St. Mary's, a non-profit preservation organization.

== History ==
=== Early years ===
The present-day building is the third church built in the village to serve the needs of Catholic immigrants. The first Irish Catholics began to arrive in eastern Adair County in the early 1840s, with a substantial increase thereafter largely due to the Great Famine. The first services were held in a private residence in Adair in 1844. They were conducted by Father McNamee, who journeyed to the village with his portable altar by horseback from Edina, Missouri. In 1860 the first Catholic church, a rough-hewn log structure, was constructed and the first priest, Father Ryan, assigned. The log church was replaced in 1869 with a simple wood-frame building. The village and church congregation continued to grow through the late 1800s, and by 1900 it was clear to the worshipers that something more substantial was needed.

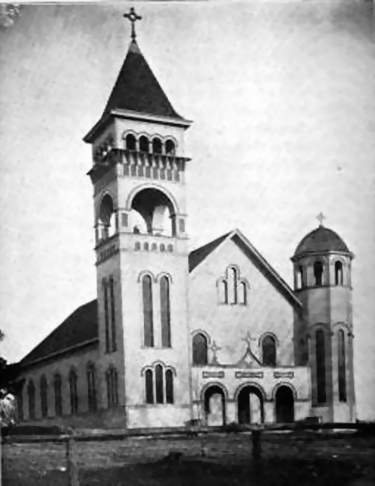
St. Mary's Catholic Church, circa 1910. Note the taller tower than the present day photo due to storm damage.

=== A new home ===
The current St. Mary's Church was constructed between 1904 and 1905 under the direction of John V. Barwarth of Edina, Missouri, for a sum of $10,000. Due to its somewhat remote location in the county, lumber and most other construction materials had to be delivered by rail to Baring, Missouri, several miles to the east in Knox county, then hauled by wagon to Adair. The new church was built on the same grounds as the old, with the latter moved a short distance away for use as a school. On June 15, 1905, a dedication was held for the new church, conducted by Archbishop John J. Glennon (later known as John Cardinal Glennon) with a large gathering of Catholics from across northeast Missouri, and even some non-Catholic neighbors, in attendance.

The new building's dimensions at time of completion were 88 feet, 4 inches by 52 feet, 2 inches. The dominant features were the two towers, one each on the northwest and southwest corners of the building. The northwest, the bell tower, is 12 feet, 4 inches square and was originally 90 feet in height. However a severe storm nearly destroyed it some years later and repairs left it at the current 50 feet in height. The southwest tower is octagonal in shape and 40 feet in height with round arch openings and Corinthian style supports, topped by a dome. A highlight of the octagonal tower is a statue known as The Sorrowful Mother. It is believed to be one of only three reproductions of the statue in the United States, with the original in Rome, Italy. The buildings interior features a large sanctuary with two small vestries. Pressed Florentine style tin covers the ceiling and much of the interior walls, while the flooring is made of tongue-in-groove yellow pine. A semi-circular balcony overlooks part of the sanctuary and provided extra seating as needed. A few years after initial construction ornate lighting fixtures of Tiffany design were added to the sanctuary.

=== Decline and resurrection ===
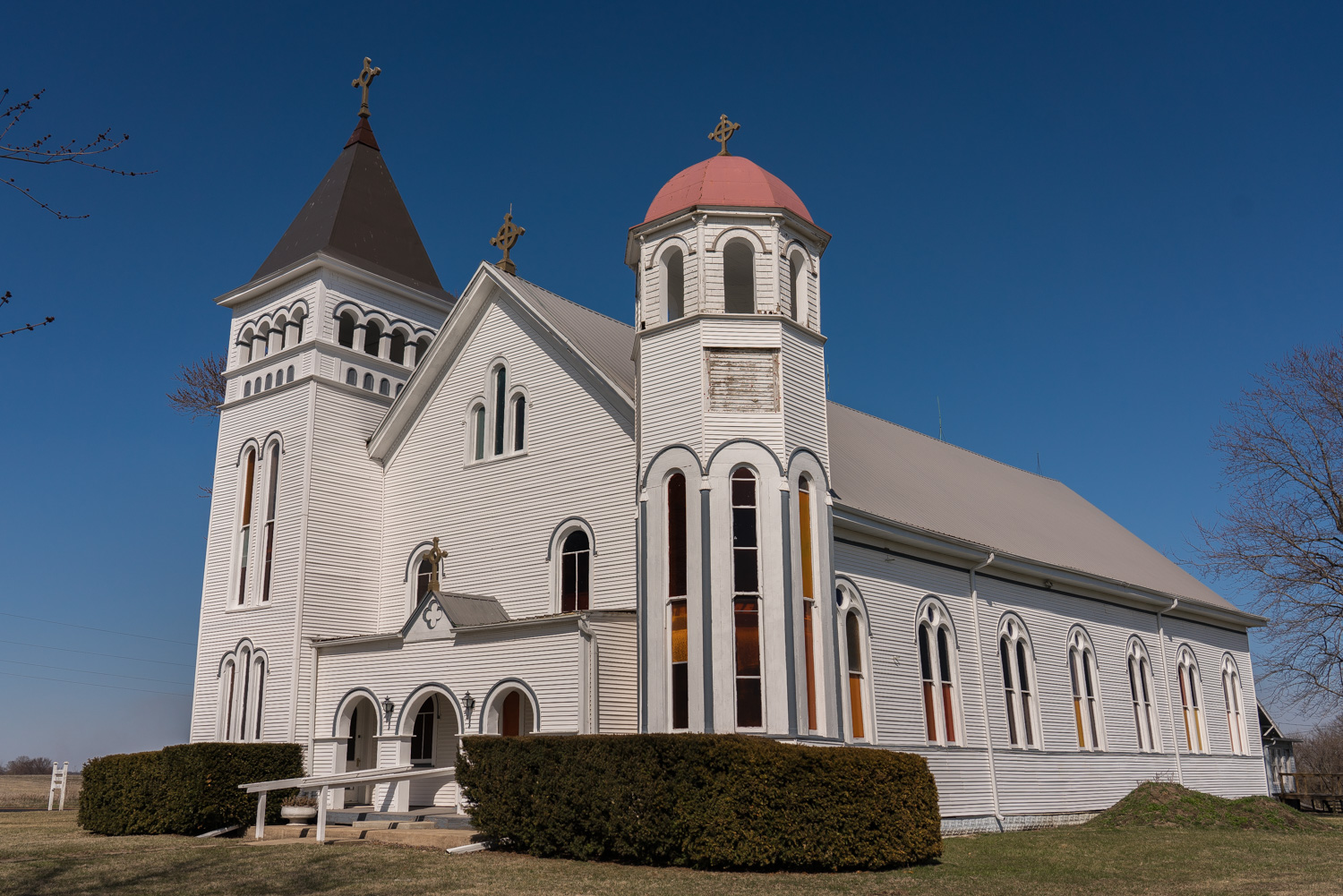
St. Mary's Catholic Church as it appeared April 7, 2018.

St. Mary's Church, and the surrounding community, continued to grow for the first two decades of the 20th century. Adair had a sizable business district catering to area farmers – a population of over 400 – and a Catholic school was built. The years after World War I and then the Great Depression were not kind to either the village or the church. A general trend in America saw younger generations leaving the agriculture field for job opportunities in cities. A loss of children caused the closure of the Catholic school in 1925. The emergence of the automobile and improved roads in rural Missouri meant families could easily travel to larger towns in the area like Baring, Edina, and Kirksville to shop. Each town also having its own Catholic church – in the case of Edina and Kirksville, quite substantial congregations – meant combining morning Mass with an afternoon of resupplying before returning home. By 1942 only 30 people were counted as part of the St. Mary's parish. In 1958 St. Mary's was relegated to being a mission of Mary Immaculate Church in Kirksville. In December, 1972, with the congregation reduced to less than twenty adults – most elderly – it was announced that all Masses at St. Mary's would be discontinued for the winter. They would not ever resume. The church rectory was sold off in 1973 and it appeared a grim fate awaited the church. However, a small group of former parishioners and non-Catholics interested in historical preservation refused to let the unique church architecture be destroyed without a fight. A petition to have the building placed on the National Register of Historical Places was filed, and on December 16, 1974, that request was granted. The following May the non-profit Friends of St. Mary's Church of Adair, Missouri, Incorporated was chartered by the state of Missouri with the purpose of preservation and restoration of the church. On July 12, 1976, the Diocese of Jefferson City (Missouri) deeded the church to the group. Since that time the group has focused on maintenance, with some restoration as money allows. A variety of fundraisers are held to support the efforts. At present no services are regularly held and the building is open to the public only by special arrangement.
