= Adair County Courthouse (Missouri) =

- U.S. National Register of Historic Places
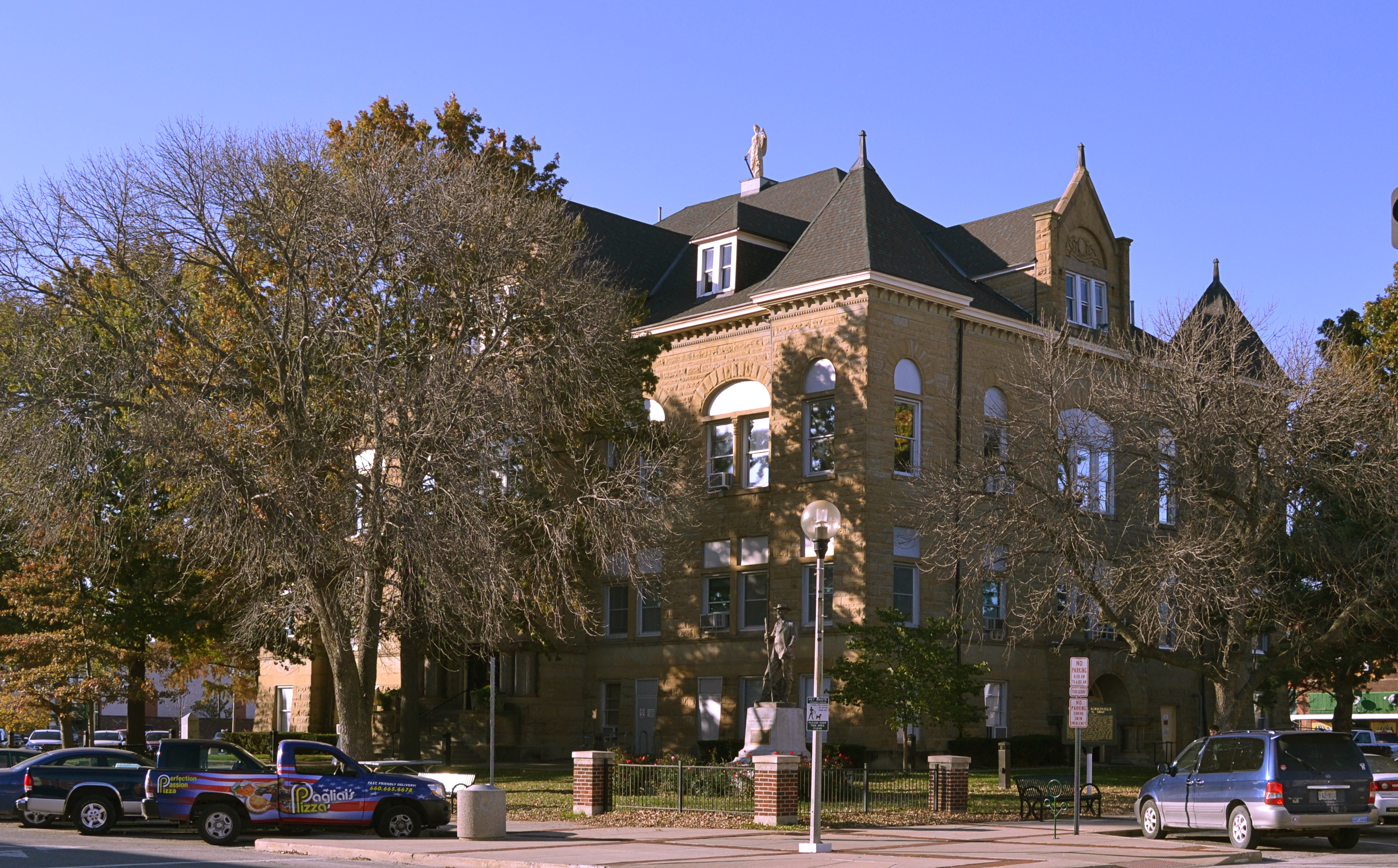
- Adair County Courthouse, October 2014

- Location within Missouri Location within the United States
- Location: Washington St., Kirksville, Missouri
- Coordinates: 40°11′42″N 92°35′1″W
- Area: 1.3 acres (0.53 ha)
- Built: 1898
- Architect: Kirsch & Company; Kirsch, Robert G.
- Architectural style: Romanesque, Richardsonian Romanesque
- NRHP reference No.: 78001636
- Added to NRHP: August 11, 1978

Adair County Courthouse is a historic courthouse located at Kirksville, Missouri, United States. It was built in 1898, and is a three-story, Richardsonian Romanesque style rectangular building. It is constructed of rusticated stone, and has a medium composition hipped roof. It has four gables, four hipped dormers, and features four corner pavilions with pyramidal roofs. It features large Roman entrance arches supported by pairs of short, thick colonnettes of polished granite.

It was listed on the National Register of Historic Places in 1978.
