= Kirksville, Missouri =

City in Missouri, U.S.

- City
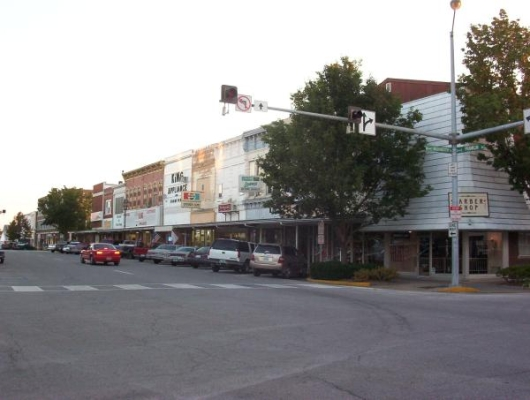
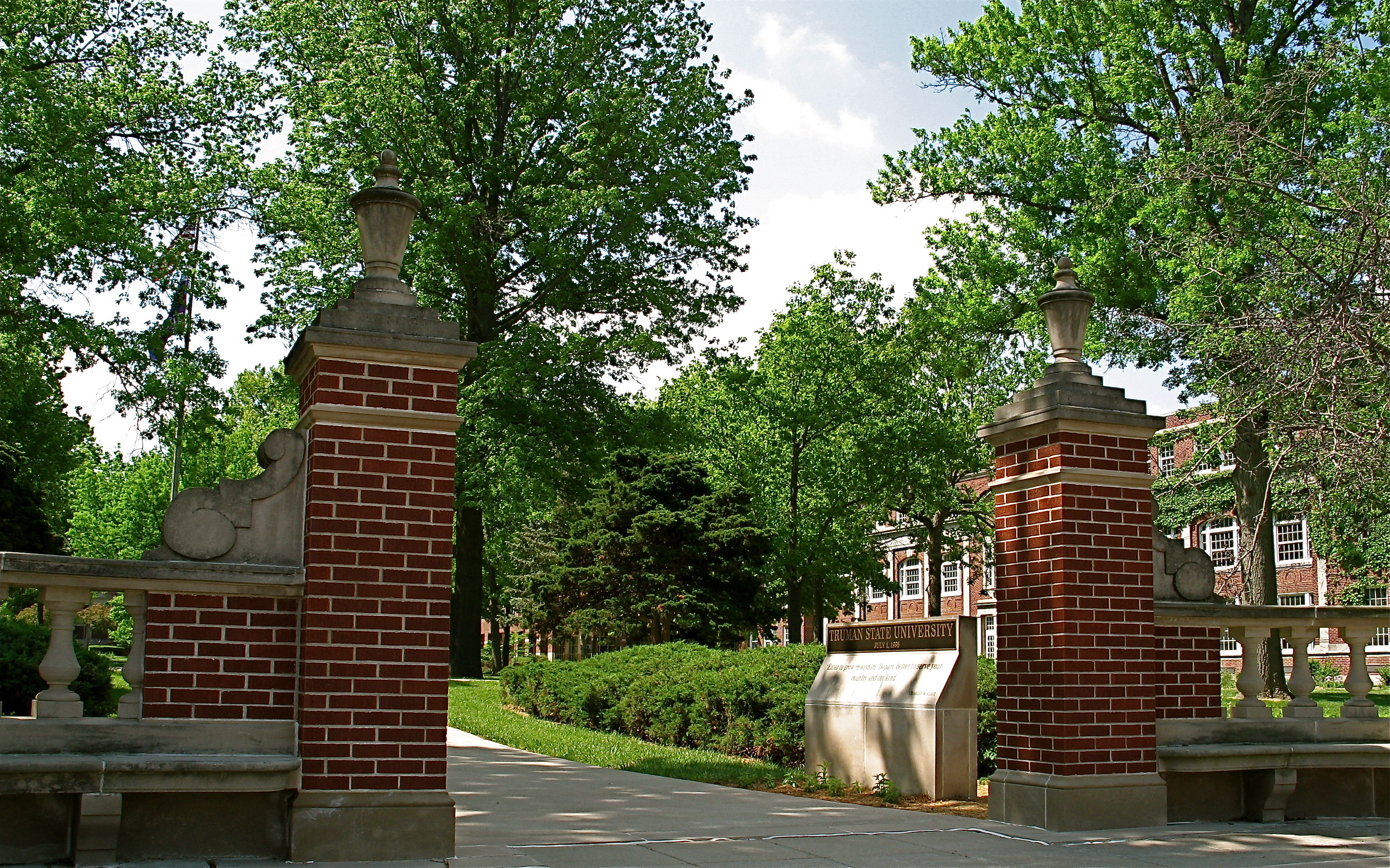
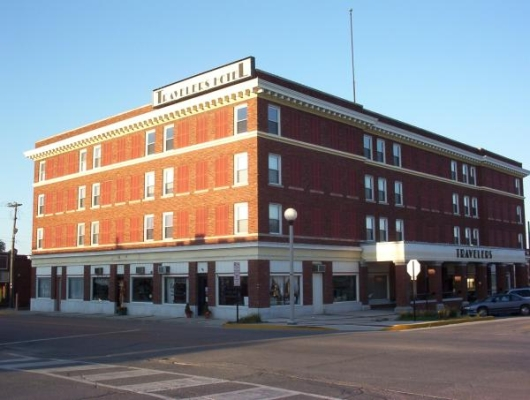
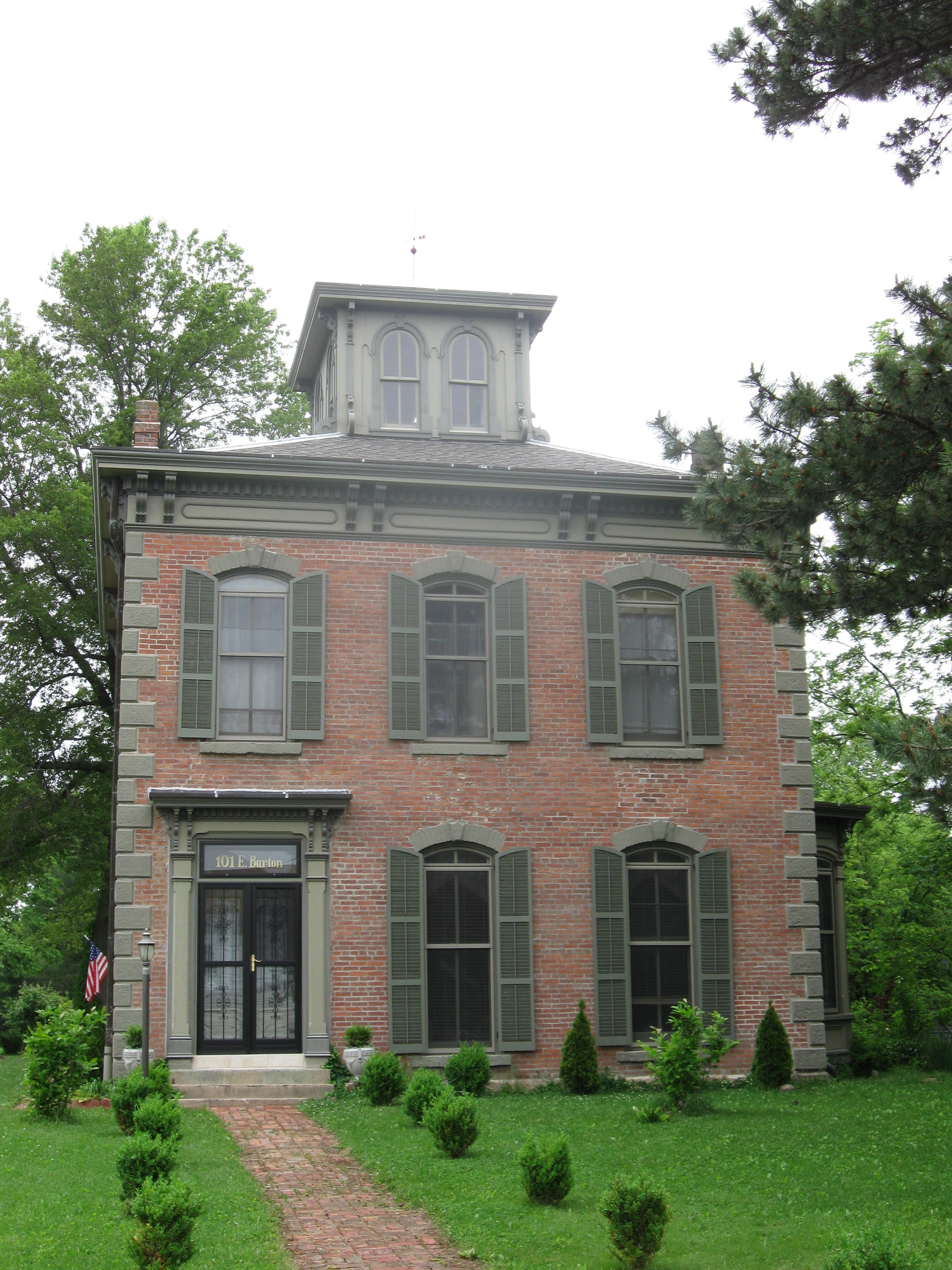
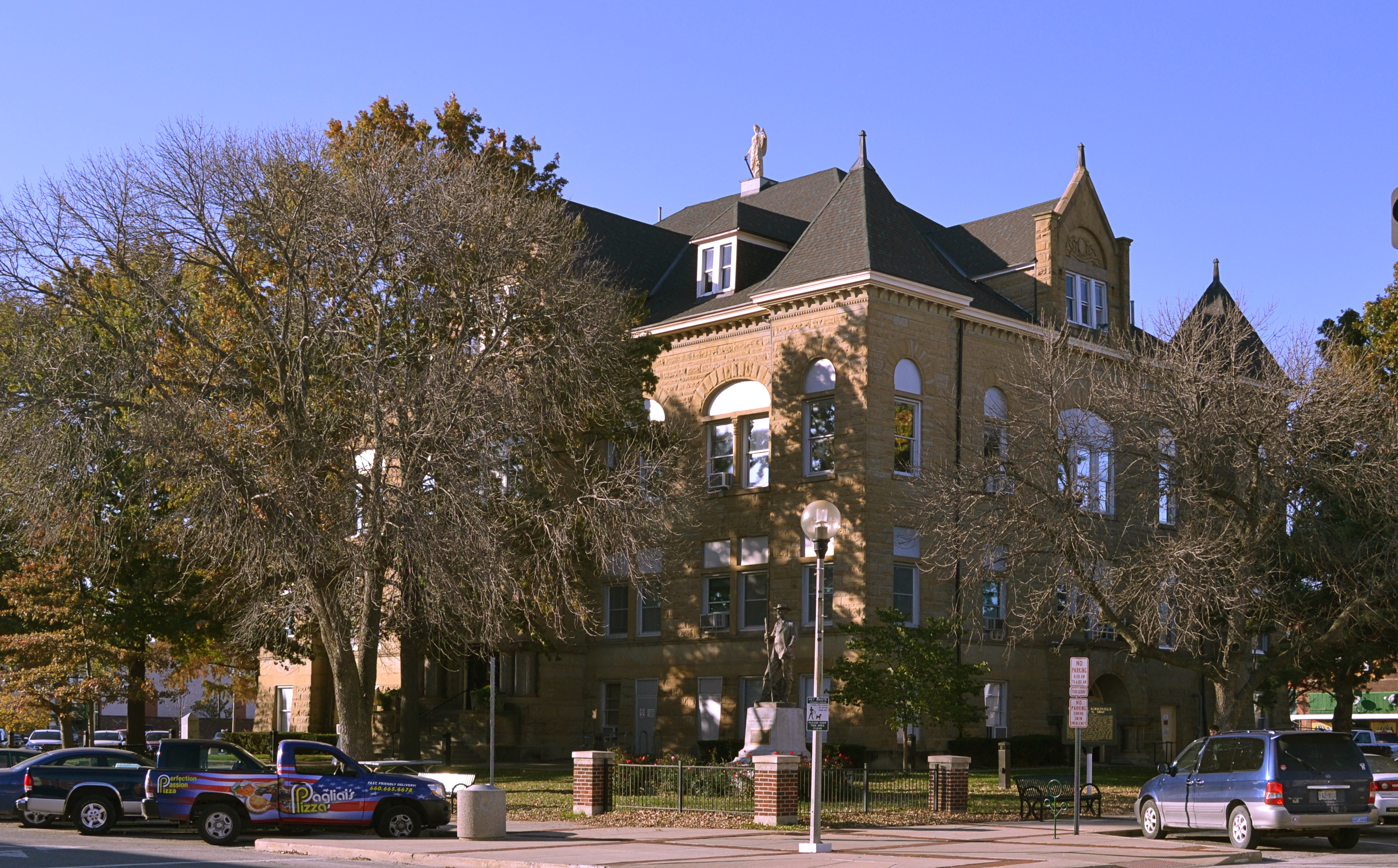
- Downtown Kirksville Truman State University Travelers Hotel Harris House Adair County Courthouse

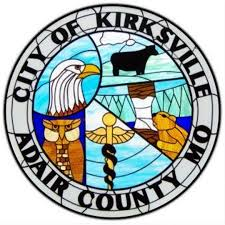
- Seal Logo

- Location within Adair County, Missouri

- Location within Missouri Location within the United States
- Coordinates: 40°11′41″N 92°35′0″W
- Country: United States
- State: Missouri
- County: Adair
- Township: Benton
- Platted: 1841
- Incorporated: 1857

Government
  - Type: Council-manager government
  - Mayor: Zac Burden
  - City Manager: Mari Macomber
  - City Council: List: Kabir Bansal; Zac Burden (Mayor); John Gardner; Rick Steele; Jennifer Walston

Area
  - Total: 14.42 sq mi (37.36 km^{2})
  - Land: 14.39 sq mi (37.26 km^{2})
  - Water: 0.039 sq mi (0.10 km^{2})
- Elevation: 968 ft (295 m)

Population (2020)
  - Total: 17,530
  - Density: 1,218.5/sq mi (470.48/km^{2})
- Demonym: Kirksvillian
- Time zone: UTC-6 (CST)
  - Summer (DST): UTC-5 (CDT)
- ZIP code: 63501
- Area code: 660
- FIPS code: 29-39026
- Website: www.kirksvillecity.com

Kirksville is the county seat of and most populous city in Adair County, Missouri, United States. Located in Benton Township, its population was 17,530 at the 2020 census. Kirksville is home to three colleges: Truman State University, Moberly Area Community College, and A.T. Still University.

== History ==
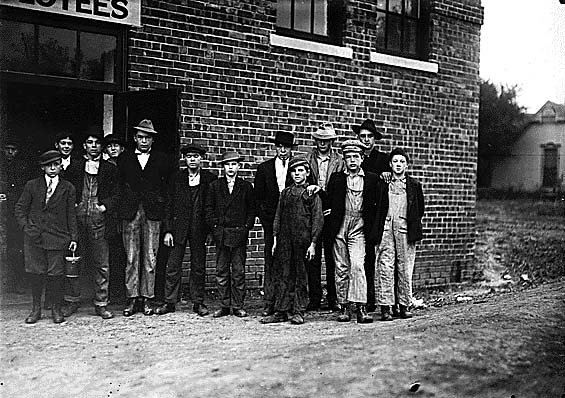
Group of men and boys at Friedman Shelby Shoe Company in 1910

Kirksville was laid out in 1841 on a 40-acre (0.06 sq mi; 16.19 ha) site, and was first incorporated in 1857.

=== Origin of name ===
According to tradition Jesse Kirk, Kirksville's first postmaster, shared a dinner of turkey and whiskey with surveyors working in the area on the condition that they would name the town after him. Not only the first postmaster, Kirk was also the first to own a hotel and a tavern in Kirksville.

Contrary to popular belief, the name of the city has no connection to John Kirk, onetime president of Truman State University from 1899 to 1925. However, the grandson of Jesse Kirk reported that the town was named for Kirk's son John, a figure of local legend credited with killing two deer with a single bullet.

Before the town was officially platted, the area had been known as Long Point and then Hopkinsville. "Hopkinsville" was explained as a joking reference to the peculiar gait of John Kirk's lame father-in-law, David Sloan; the jocular name was discarded when the village was selected for the seat of justice in Adair County.

=== Battle of Kirksville ===
The Battle of Kirksville was fought August 6–9, 1862, during the American Civil War. Union troops led by John McNeil forced Confederate volunteers under Joseph Porter to vacate the city. Casualty estimates (almost entirely Confederate) range from 150 to 200 dead and up to 400 wounded. According to the August 12, 1862, Quincy Herald there were 8 Federal dead and 25 wounded. The victorious Union commander, Colonel McNeil, gained brief national attention for his post-battle execution of a small number of Confederate prisoners. These prisoners had been previously captured in battle and then paroled with the understanding they would no longer take up arms against the Union, upon penalty of death if recaptured. Nonetheless, Confederate government officials were outraged, and it is said that Confederate president Jefferson Davis even called for the execution of Colonel (later Brigadier General) McNeil if he were to be captured.

=== Tornadoes ===
On the evening of April 27, 1899, an F4 tornado passing through Adair County cut a path of destruction three blocks wide, killed 34 people and destroyed hundreds of buildings. The popular song "Just as the Storm Passed O'er" was based on the event, and the Kimball Piano Company exploited the incident for its advertising, when one of their instruments was carried a long distance by the tornado but still found in working condition.

On May 13, 2009, Kirksville was again the victim of a large tornado. An EF2 tornado struck the northern edge of Kirksville destroying or severely damaging many homes, several businesses, a car dealership, and at least one factory. Two residents living just outside the city limits were killed by the tornado, and as many as a dozen other area residents were injured. The story and extensive video of the 2009 twister was featured in season 3, episode 4 of Storm Chasers on the Discovery Channel as well as a 2010 episode of Storm Stories on The Weather Channel.

=== National Register of Historic Places ===
The Adair County Courthouse, Bear Creek Baptist Church, Dockery Hotel, Grim Building, Capt. Thomas C. Harris House, Journal Printing Company Building, Kirksville Courthouse Square Historic District, Drs. George and Blanche Laughlin House, Masonic Temple, Dr. E. Sanborn Smith House, Orie J. Smith Black and White Stock Farm Historic District, Sojourners Club, Travelers Hotel, and Trinity Episcopal Church are listed on the National Register of Historic Places.

== Demographics ==
Historical population
Census	Pop.	Note	%±
1860	658		—
1870	1,471		123.6%
1880	2,314		57.3%
1890	3,510		51.7%
1900	5,966		70.0%
1910	6,347		6.4%
1920	7,213		13.6%
1930	8,293		15.0%
1940	10,080		21.5%
1950	11,110		10.2%
1960	13,123		18.1%
1970	15,569		18.6%
1980	17,167		10.3%
1990	17,152		−0.1%
2000	16,988		−1.0%
2010	17,505		3.0%
2020	17,530		0.1%
U.S. Decennial Census

Kirksville anchors a micropolitan area that comprises Adair and Schuyler counties.

=== 2020 census ===
As of the 2020 census, Kirksville had a population of 17,530. The census counted 6,859 households and 2,766 families. The median age was 26.2 years. 17.1% of residents were under the age of 18 and 13.6% of residents were 65 years of age or older. For every 100 females there were 88.9 males, and for every 100 females age 18 and over there were 86.1 males age 18 and over.

96.1% of residents lived in urban areas, while 3.9% lived in rural areas.

Of the 6,859 households in Kirksville, 22.9% had children under the age of 18 living in them. Of all households, 31.2% were married-couple households, 24.6% were households with a male householder and no spouse or partner present, and 36.4% were households with a female householder and no spouse or partner present. About 40.2% of all households were made up of individuals and 13.0% had someone living alone who was 65 years of age or older. The average household size was 2.4 and the average family size was 3.2.

There were 7,814 housing units, of which 12.2% were vacant. The homeowner vacancy rate was 1.8% and the rental vacancy rate was 8.1%.

Racial composition as of the 2020 census
Race	Number	Percent
White	14,424	82.3%
Black or African American	1,271	7.3%
American Indian and Alaska Native	38	0.2%
Asian	639	3.6%
Native Hawaiian and Other Pacific Islander	10	0.1%
Some other race	202	1.2%
Two or more races	946	5.4%
Hispanic or Latino (of any race)	561	3.2%

=== Income and poverty ===
The 2016–2020 5-year American Community Survey estimates show that the median household income was $36,228 (with a margin of error of +/- $5,059) and the median family income was $55,982 (+/- $8,114). Males had a median income of $21,690 (+/- $3,486) versus $12,899 (+/- $3,029) for females. The median income for those above 16 years old was $16,688 (+/- $2,033). Approximately, 10.6% of families and 28.8% of the population were below the poverty line, including 19.2% of those under the age of 18 and 13.9% of those ages 65 or over.

=== 2010 census ===
As of the census of 2010, there were 17,505 people, 6,714 households, and 3,066 families residing in the city. The population density was 1,216.5 inhabitants per square mile (469.7/km^{2}). There were 7,434 housing units at an average density of 516.6 per square mile (199.5/km^{2}). The racial makeup of the city was

- 92.3% White,
- 2.2% African American,
- 0.2% Native American,
- 2.4% Asian, 0.1% Pacific Islander, 0.8% from other races, and 2.0% from two or more races.
- Hispanic or Latino of any race were 2.7% of the population.

There were 6,714 households, of which 23.0% had children under the age of 18 living with them, 33.0% were married couples living together, 9.6% had a female householder with no husband present, 3.1% had a male householder with no wife present, and 54.3% were non-families. 37.8% of all households were made up of individuals, and 11.1% had someone living alone who was 65 years of age or older. The average household size was 2.18 and the average family size was 2.90.

The median age in the city was 23.8 years. 16.4% of residents were under the age of 18; 36% were between the ages of 18 and 24; 19% were from 25 to 44; 17.5% were from 45 to 64; and 11.2% were 65 years of age or older. The gender makeup of the city was 46.1% male and 53.9% female.

=== 2000 census ===
As of the census of 2000, there were 16,988 people, 6,583 households, and 2,975 families residing in the city. The population density was 1,624.0 inhabitants per square mile (627.0/km^{2}). There were 7,303 housing units at an average density of 698.2 per square mile (269.6/km^{2}). The racial makeup of the city was 94.38% White, 1.73% African American, 0.26% Native American, 1.93% Asian, 0.04% Pacific Islander, 0.59% from other races, and 1.07% from two or more races. Hispanic or Latino of any race were 1.54% of the population.

There were 6,583 households, out of which 20.8% had children under the age of 18 living with them, 35.1% were married couples living together, 7.8% had a female householder with no husband present, and 54.8% were non-families. 36.9% of all households were made up of individuals, and 11.6% had someone living alone who was 65 years of age or older. The average household size was 2.16 and the average family size was 2.83.

In the city, the population was spread out, with 15.6% under the age of 18, 37.6% from 18 to 24, 20.5% from 25 to 44, 14.4% from 45 to 64, and 12.0% who were 65 years of age or older. The median age was 23 years. For every 100 females, there were 82.5 males. For every 100 females age 18 and over, there were 78.5 males.

The median income for a household in the city was $22,836, and the median income for a family was $36,772. Males had a median income of $26,776 versus $22,309 for females. The per capita income for the city was $14,388. About 14.4% of families and 30.6% of the population were below the poverty line, including 20.7% of those under age 18 and 13.1% of those age 65 or over.

=== Congolese population ===
By 2015 a number of persons originating from the Democratic Republic of the Congo settled in Kirksville; they first came to the U.S. through diversity visas. Many found work at a Farmland Foods facility in nearby Milan, Missouri. In 2014 five Congolese families lived in Kirksville. By February 2016 almost 40 Congolese families resided in Kirksville, totaling around 100 people.

Prior to 2015 about half of the 20-25 English as a second language program students in the Kirksville R-III School District were of Hispanic origin, but the wave of Congolese students appeared by 2015, doubling the number of ESOL students and giving it a French-speaking population not previously present. Therefore, the district began expanding its ESOL program.

Students and faculty from Truman State University took steps to help the Congolese residents acclimate to life in Kirksville.

According to Sana Camara of Truman State, many of the immigrants were well-educated, and the main barrier to success was specifically a lack of English knowledge.

== Geography ==
According to the United States Census Bureau, the city has a total area of 14.43 square miles (37.37 km^{2}), of which, 14.39 square miles (37.27 km^{2}) is land and 0.04 square miles (0.10 km^{2}) is water.

=== Climate ===
Kirksville has a hot-summer humid continental climate (Köppen Dfa). Summers are warm and humid, while winters are cold and snowy. Precipitation is highest in the summer months, and is mostly produced by thunderstorms (a few of which can become severe).

Climate data for Kirksville, Missouri (1991–2020 normals, extremes 1893–present)
Month	Jan	Feb	Mar	Apr	May	Jun	Jul	Aug	Sep	Oct	Nov	Dec	Year
Record high °F (°C)	70 (21)	78 (26)	85 (29)	93 (34)	101 (38)	106 (41)	113 (45)	111 (44)	104 (40)	95 (35)	93 (34)	74 (23)	113 (45)
Mean maximum °F (°C)	56.7 (13.7)	62.7 (17.1)	74.5 (23.6)	82.1 (27.8)	85.3 (29.6)	91.2 (32.9)	95.8 (35.4)	95.6 (35.3)	89.5 (31.9)	82.0 (27.8)	70.5 (21.4)	58.7 (14.8)	97.4 (36.3)
Mean daily maximum °F (°C)	33.6 (0.9)	38.4 (3.6)	50.5 (10.3)	62.4 (16.9)	72.1 (22.3)	81.4 (27.4)	85.7 (29.8)	84.3 (29.1)	77.0 (25.0)	64.6 (18.1)	50.7 (10.4)	38.6 (3.7)	61.6 (16.4)
Daily mean °F (°C)	24.3 (−4.3)	28.7 (−1.8)	39.8 (4.3)	50.9 (10.5)	61.7 (16.5)	71.4 (21.9)	75.6 (24.2)	73.8 (23.2)	65.6 (18.7)	53.7 (12.1)	40.7 (4.8)	29.8 (−1.2)	51.3 (10.7)
Mean daily minimum °F (°C)	15.1 (−9.4)	19.0 (−7.2)	29.2 (−1.6)	39.5 (4.2)	51.2 (10.7)	61.3 (16.3)	65.5 (18.6)	63.3 (17.4)	54.3 (12.4)	42.9 (6.1)	30.7 (−0.7)	21.1 (−6.1)	41.1 (5.1)
Mean minimum °F (°C)	−4.8 (−20.4)	−0.5 (−18.1)	10.7 (−11.8)	24.5 (−4.2)	36.4 (2.4)	48.2 (9.0)	54.5 (12.5)	52.2 (11.2)	37.9 (3.3)	26.7 (−2.9)	14.6 (−9.7)	−0.9 (−18.3)	−10.5 (−23.6)
Record low °F (°C)	−23 (−31)	−31 (−35)	−13 (−25)	8 (−13)	22 (−6)	37 (3)	46 (8)	40 (4)	25 (−4)	1 (−17)	−10 (−23)	−23 (−31)	−31 (−35)
Average precipitation inches (mm)	1.39 (35)	2.01 (51)	2.67 (68)	4.09 (104)	5.79 (147)	5.94 (151)	4.85 (123)	4.16 (106)	4.18 (106)	3.29 (84)	2.32 (59)	1.78 (45)	42.47 (1,079)
Average snowfall inches (cm)	6.0 (15)	4.6 (12)	2.2 (5.6)	0.8 (2.0)	0.0 (0.0)	0.0 (0.0)	0.0 (0.0)	0.0 (0.0)	0.0 (0.0)	0.1 (0.25)	1.3 (3.3)	4.0 (10)	19.0 (48)
Average precipitation days (≥ 0.01 in)	5.5	6.6	8.4	11.1	11.9	10.8	8.7	9.0	8.1	8.9	7.6	7.0	103.6
Average snowy days (≥ 0.1 in)	2.8	2.7	1.2	0.3	0.0	0.0	0.0	0.0	0.0	0.1	0.7	2.4	10.2
Source: NOAA

== Government ==
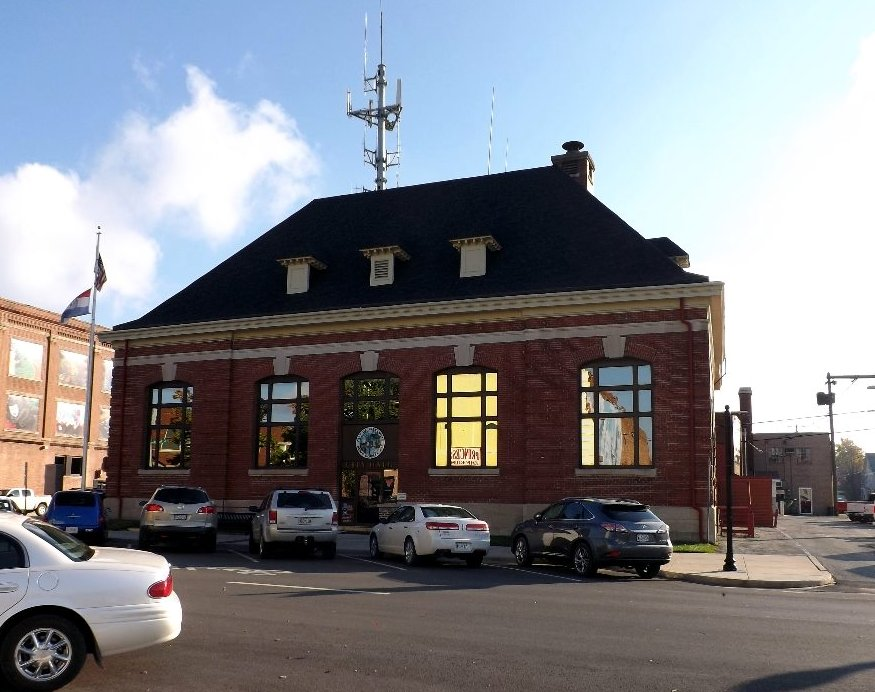
Kirksville City Hall. The building was originally constructed as a U.S. Post Office in the early 1900s and was converted for city use in the 1960s.

Kirksville is a Missouri Third-Class city, operating as a council-manager government. A paid city manager and staff handle the day-to-day operations and report to the city council.

Candidates for Kirksville city council are not required to have any party affiliation (i.e. Republican or Democrat) in order to run for office. The only requirements are to be at least 21 years of age, a United States citizen, to have lived in the city for at least one year prior to election, and to not have any outstanding/overdue city or county taxes. All members are elected in an "at large" representation basis versus any particular section or ward. Following each election, the councilmembers vote among themselves to choose a member to serve a one-year term as mayor. Council meetings are held the second and fourth Monday of each month with informative study sessions held on the third Monday. The Kirksville City Council Members as of Feb. 2021 were:

- Zac Burden (Mayor)
- John Gardner (Mayor Pro Tem)
- Kabir Bansal
- John Hanley
- Cindy Mayberry

The city of Kirksville provides residents with full-time fire and police departments, along with water, sewer, and street maintenance service. Citywide trash removal is contracted by the city with a private contractor and is mandatory for all residents or property owners. Recycling is optional. The city of Kirksville operates Kirk-Tran, an area bus service, and a county-wide E-911 Center.

== Education ==
Kirksville is home to three institutions of higher learning:

- Truman State University, Missouri's liberal arts and sciences university, originally the North Missouri Normal School and Commercial College, and more recently Northeast Missouri State University.
- A.T. Still University, home of the Kirksville College of Osteopathic Medicine, the founding osteopathic medical and dental schools.
- Moberly Area Community College (MACC) operates a Kirksville campus.

Primary and secondary schools, including Kirksville High School, are operated by the Kirksville R-III School District.

Kirksville has a public library, the Adair County Public Library.

== Media ==
Paired with Ottumwa, Iowa, Kirksville is a media market region, ranked 201 by Nielsen.

Television stations include dual ABC/CBS affiliate KTVO (channel 3) and K30MG-D (channel 15; translator of Fox/NBC/The CW+ affiliate KYOU-TV channel 15 in Ottumwa).

Radio stations include KTRM, a student radio from Truman State University; and KRXL, a classic rock station serving the Kirksville/Ottumwa region.

In print, Kirksville is served by the Kirksville Daily Express, Sundays through Fridays, and on Thursdays by the Index, a weekly newspaper produced by students at Truman State University. The students of Truman State University also publish an alternative newspaper, The Monitor.

Truman students produce a weekly news broadcast, News 36, played on CableOne channel 3 and on their on-campus station, TruTV, on Tuesday and Thursday at 5:30pm, 9:00pm, 10:00pm, and 2:00am.

== Infrastructure ==
=== Transportation ===
==== Transit ====
Kirksville is served by Kirk-Tran, which provides residents with a deviated fixed-route transit system and demand response service. The deviated fixed-route bus service is a single loop route operating hourly from 7:00am to 6:00pm Monday-Thursday, 7:00am to 9:00pm on Fridays and 9:00am to 9:00pm on Saturdays. There is no service on Sundays.

==== Railroads ====
Kirksville, by way of La Plata, is serviced by Amtrak's Southwest Chief which runs along the BNSF Railway. The distance from Truman State University to La Plata (Amtrak station) is approximately 12.5 miles (20.1 km).

Kirksville once had two operational railroads that ran through town. The east–west rail line was originally incorporated as the Quincy, Missouri & Pacific Railroad, which was renamed several times during financial restructuring and changing hands numerous times, until in 1897 it became the Quincy, Omaha & Kansas City Railroad. Financial problems continued, and it was operated by the Chicago, Burlington, and Quincy Railroad after 1903 and later absorbed by that company, which in turn became Burlington Northern in 1970. The portion of the line that ran west of Kirksville towards Green City was abandoned and eventually torn down in the early 1950s. The portion of the line that ran east of town towards Edina, Labelle, and West Quincy was scrapped in 1982–1983, after the Staggers Rail Act deregulated the rail industry. The depot which serviced along the Burlington Northern in Kirksville still stands along Elson Street just north of Cottonwood Street and plans are that it will be renovated.

Kirksville's other railroad, the Wabash Railroad, became the Norfolk and Western Railway in October 1964. This north–south line later became the Norfolk Southern Railway in 1982 after N&W merged with Southern Railway. In April 1992, the last official NS train ran the line between Albia, IA and Moberly, MO as the railroad announced it would abandon the line due to a loss in profit. During the summer of 1993, the railroad reopened to train traffic as the floods of the midwest affected lines around the Mississippi and Missouri rivers. Trains continued to run the line until 1995. After failed attempts from buyers wanting to purchase the line and turn it into a shortline railroad, work began on tearing down the railroad from Moberly, MO northward toward La Plata, MO where it has a connection with the BNSF Railway and from Moulton, IA southward toward La Plata, MO. The portion of the line from Moulton, IA northward towards Albia was purchased by the Appanoose County Community Railroad. In late September 1997, the tracks through Kirksville were finally torn out, leaving the city without a rail line. The project to tear out the abandoned line was completed by the end of 1997.

==== Aviation ====
Kirksville Regional Airport is located in the village of Millard. It serves both commercial flights and general aviation.

In 1952, the United States Air Force opened a radar base that was home to the 790th Radar Squadron, an Aircraft Control and Warning Squadron, in Sublette, about 10 mi (16 km) north of Kirksville. The Air Force inactivated the 790th Radar Squadron in 1968. The Federal Aviation Administration took over running the radar and most of the surrounding 78.51 acres (317,700 m^{2}) were given to Northeast Missouri State University. The current radar, an Air Route Surveillance Radar - Model 3, is a long-range radar that feeds data to air traffic control centers that control aircraft flying over the region.

=== Utilities ===
Kirksville is served by two watersheds. Hazel Creek Lake (530 acres), formed in 1982, was first used as a water source the next year. The larger water source, Forrest Lake (640 acres), was formed by the city in the 1950s when a dam was constructed across Big Creek. Forrest Lake anchors the Thousand Hills State Park, located just west of the city and is named in honor of former Missouri Governor Forrest Smith.

== Notable people ==
- Doris Akers, gospel singer and composer.
- Samuel W. Arnold, three-term U.S. Representative from Missouri 1st District (1943–49)
- Joseph Baldwin, founder and first president of First District Normal School, now Truman State University
- William Beckner, mathematician
- Gordon Bell, early computer engineer
- Robert J. Behnen, genealogist and former member of the Missouri House of Representatives
- Lewis Binford, prominent 20th century archaeologist and anthropologist
- Anthony Cistaro, actor, born in Kirksville, but grew up in California.
- Charles F. Cochran, U.S. Representative (1897–1905), born in Kirksville.
- Debra Di Blasi, prize-winning writer
- Rusty Draper, singer
- Leo Goeke, opera singer
- Alex Linder, White Supremacy leader and owner/operator of the Vanguard News Network
- Lucy Foster Madison (1865–1932), American novelist and teacher
- Rebecca Mark-Jusbasche, former head of Enron International
- Joe Maxwell, Lieutenant Governor of Missouri
- Rebecca McClanahan, Professor of Nursing and member of the Missouri House of Representatives
- Archie Musick painter 1902–1978
- Jim Musick, American professional football player.
- John R. Musick, late 19th-century historian and author
- Ruth Ann Musick, folklorist and author
- Geraldine Page, Academy Award-winning actress
- James E. Rieger, US Army colonel, winner of the Distinguished Service Cross.
- Carolyne Roehm, author, businesswoman, socialite, fashion designer
- Andrew Taylor Still, M.D., D.O., founder of Osteopathic Medicine
- Robert Taylor Actor who lived in Kirksville as a child.
- William Traylor, character actor and founder of the Loft Studio in Hollywood.
- John Textor, businessman
- Rhonda Vincent, Award-winning bluegrass singer.
- James F. Walker, artist
- Arthur L. Willard, U.S. Navy Rear Admiral & winner of the Navy Cross.
- John Wimber, Charismatic Movement leader and keyboardist for The Righteous Brothers

== See also ==
- List of cities in Missouri
